= 37th Armor Regiment =

37th Armored Regiment
- 37th Armor coat of arms
- Active: 1941–2011; 2015-present
- Country: United States
- Branch: Army
- Type: Armor
- Part of: 1st Armored Division
- Garrison/HQ: 1–37AR: Fort Bliss, TX; 2–37AR: Fort Bliss, TX
- Nicknames: "First to Bastogne"; 1-37: "Bandits"; 2-37: "Dukes"; 3-37: "No Slack"; 4-37: "Thunderbolts"
- Motto: "Courage Conquers"
- Colors: Yellow, blue and red
- Engagements: World War II (4th Armored Division): Battle of Arracourt; Desert Storm; Iraq War

Commanders
- Notable commanders: LTC Creighton Abrams (GEN); LTC Clayton Melton (BG); LTC Edward L. Dyer (MG); LTC Robert White (BG); LTC David R. Hogg (LTG)

The 37th Armor is an armor (tank) regiment of the United States Army. It is the successor to the 37th Tank Battalion, 4th Armored Division, commanded by then Lieutenant Colonel Creighton Abrams (the namesake of the M1 Abrams) during World War II.

== World War II ==
The 37th Armored Regiment (37th Armor) was constituted 13 January 1941 in the Regular Army as the 7th Armored Regiment (7th Armor) and assigned to the 4th Armored Division (4th Armored) when the Armored Division was activated on 15 April 1941 at Pine Camp (now Fort Drum), New York. The 7th Armor Regiment was redesignated the 37th Armored Regiment on 8 May 1941. The first filler personnel arrived at Pine Camp four days later, and two weeks after that a thirteen-week basic training cycle was begun. Training in the fundamentals of armor began, despite the fact that there were only twenty one tanks in the entire 4th Armored Division. Many of the 37th Armor's key personnel were selected to cadre the 8th Armored Division.

In October 1942, the 4th Armored Division moved to Camp Forrest in Tullahoma, Tennessee on the Cumberland Plateau for maneuvers. In November, they moved again, to the West Coast Desert Training Center, first occupying Camp Ibis near Needles, California, California (in the Mojave Desert) and the Arizona and Nevada borders. During this time, some of the lessons learned in combat in North Africa by the 1st Armored Division and 2nd Armored Division were taught to the 4th Armored Division. In early June 1943, orders came for the 4th Armored Division to dismount at Camp Bowie, an Armored Division training center near Brownwood, Texas.

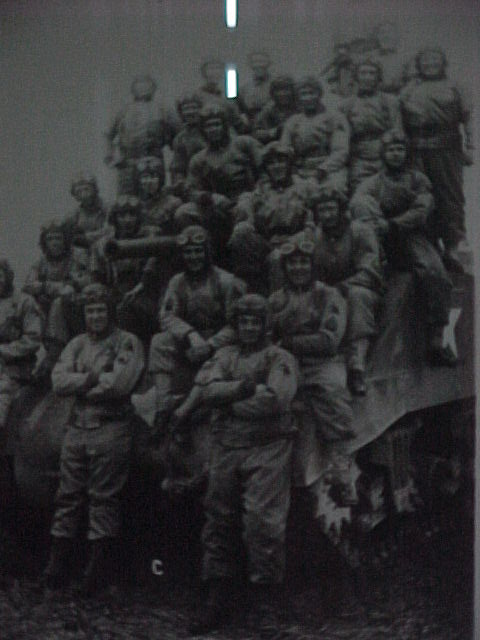
Members of 1st Platoon, Company B, 37th Tank Battalion at Wiltshire, England in May 1944

On 10 September 1943, the 4th Armored Division including the 37th Armored Regiment was reorganized in a new table of organization and equipment for most U.S. armored divisions. The 37th Regiment's Headquarters and Headquarters Company and its 1st Battalion and 2nd Battalion (less Company D) were redesignated as the 37th Tank Battalion.

The 3rd Battalion was reorganized and redesignated as the 706th Tank Battalion and relieved from assignment to the 4th Armored Division. The 706th spent the war as a separate battalion. Reconnaissance Company was redesignated and reorganized as Troop F, 25th Cavalry Reconnaissance Squadron, Mechanized, a separate element of the 4th Armored Division – hereafter separate lineage. Maintenance and Service Companies were disbanded, with the personnel and equipment distributed throughout the two battalions. Following the reorganization, the 706th Tank Battalion deployed from the San Francisco Port of Embarkation on 22 March 1944 and arrived at Hawaii on 29 April 1944. From there, they deployed on LSTs in support of Admiral Chester Nimitz' wing of the Pacific Island Hopping Campaign. 706th Tank Battalion was on Guam by 22 July 1944; on The Philippines by 23 November 1944; on Ie Shima by 16 April 1945; and on Okinawa by 25 April 1945.

The 37th Tank Battalion (37th TB) was now, together with the 35th Tank Battalion and 8th Tank Battalion (redesignated from 3rd Battalion, 35th Armored Regiment), the nucleus of the 4th Armored Division. On 15 November 1943, Major General John S. Wood who commanded the 4th Armored Division, announced that the 4th Armored Division would deploy overseas. On 11 December 1943, the 4th Armored Division moved northeast by train, unloading at Camp Myles Standish, Massachusetts, on 20 December 1943 for winter training. The 4th AD sailed from the Boston Port of Embarkation on 29 December 1943. They arrived in England for more training on 8 January 1944, and – after getting used to the local environment, and waiting for the D-Day invasion success at Normandy on 6 June, they proceeded to France on 11 July 1944 as part of the follow-on force.

=== Arrival in France, July 1944 ===
The 37th Tank Battalion moved to Southern England and prepared for transport to France. On 13 July 1944, the 4th AD and the 37th TB reached Utah Beach, but for most of the remainder of July 1944, the 37th simply waited in reserve as the 4th AD relieved elements of the weary 4th Infantry Division.

The 4th Armored Division was ordered to combat on 28 July 1944, as the U.S. First Army launched its breakout attack. The infantry divisions on both sides of the 4th AD attacked and "pinched out" the division, then the 4th AD attacked through the infantry divisions lines and began to race for the neck of the Brittany peninsula. The 37th was traveling at the forefront of this move with Colonel Bruce C. Clarke's Combat Command Alpha (CCA). The next day, Coutances fell, and then Avranches, at the northern edge of the neck of Brittany, fell on 30 July.

On its way across Brittany, the 4th Armored became part of General Patton's Third Army when it became operational on 1 August 1944. By 9 August 1944 the 37th was approaching Lorient, on the southern edge of Brittany. On 14 August 1944 the siege of Lorient was turned over to the 6th Armored Division and the 37th turned eastward with the rest of the Third Army, which was beginning its historic race across France. VII Corps was the southernmost corps of the Third Army, 4th Armored Division was on the VII Corps southern flank, and the 37th Tank Battalion was protecting the southern flank of the division. There was nothing south of the 37th except the Loire River and the Germans.

The commander of the 37th Tank Battalion, Lieutenant Colonel Creighton W. Abrams (who later became commander of all U.S. Forces in Vietnam and then the Army Chief of Staff), in an odd move, detached a task force under Major Edward Bautz to blow up the Loire River bridges between Blois and Tours, but they found upon arrival that their work had been done by the Wehrmacht. This task force then followed the Loire's northern bank, paralleling the advance of the main body. On 16 August 1944 a German column was sighted on the south bank. Major Bautz's tankers attacked this column, inflicting losses and driving the Germans back from the river.

The 37th crossed the Seine on 25 August 1944, and the Marne on 23 August 1944. The Marne Canal was bridged and the town of Châlons was attacked from the east, to the consternation of the defending garrison, which was expecting an assault on the western edge of town.

On 31 August 1944, in a quick attack during a driving rainstorm, the 37th captured the bridge across the Meuse River at Commercy before the Germans could blow it up. The next day, the gasoline ration had run out, and the 37th ground to a halt. By this time, the 37th had advanced 700 miles (1,100 km) in seven weeks, crossed three major rivers and was within one day's motor march of the German border, only seventy miles to the northwest.

On 13 September 1944, the M4 tanks of the 37th crossed the Moselle River. On 14 September 1944 they overran the rear command post of the 15th Panzer Grenadier Division at Arracourt and, in Valhey, caught the same division's forward echelon command post before it could retreat. It was at Valhey, that Sergeant Joe Sadowski of Company A, 37th Tank Battalion, would become a Medal of Honor recipient. This non-commissioned officer from Perth Amboy, New Jersey was commander of the second tank column as the 37th rolled into the French town. Swinging north around a corner, Sadowski's M4 tank clattered into the village square, where a German armor-piercing round found its mark and set the Sherman afire against the town's water trough. Sadowski had his crew dismounted and took shelter behind a building after running a gauntlet of machine gun and small arms fire. The bow gunner was found to be missing, and a quick glance at the burning tank showed the gunner's hatch still closed tight. Sadowski ..."ran back to his tank, clambered up the smoking front slope plate and tried to pry open the gunner's hatch with his bare hands. He stood on the smoking tank and strained at the hatch until he had been hit so many times he could no longer stand. He slid from his medium [tank] and died in the mud beside its tracks". His father and mother were given his posthumous Medal of Honor.

From 19 September through 22 September 1944 the Germans tried to push the 37th back across the Moselle River. At Moyenvic, the 37th saw one of the largest tank-to-tank engagements of the war, losing 14 Sherman tanks while claiming to have knocked out 55 Panther and Tiger tanks. The German counterattack was unsuccessful.

On 22 September 1944 the 37th's M4 tanks swept south again through Coincourt and Bures to the Rhine-Marne Canal. Counterattack followed counterattack as the desperate Wehrmacht tried to dislodge the 3rd Army from its position, but as the toll of Panthers mounted, the attacks dwindled in intensity and finally ceased. The 37th was relieved on 12 October 1944 by elements of the 26th (Yankee) Infantry Division. For its tenacity in the Moselle River valley, the 37th was awarded (4th AD cited) its second French Croix de guerre with Palm (its first when the 4th AD was cited for Normandy). The 37th's tankers were pulled off line for a rest after 87 straight days of combat.

The 37th moved out in a downpour on 9 November 1944 to deprive Hitler of the industrial Saar River Valley. On 11 November 1944 the 37th was caught on the road and lost six tanks because they could not maneuver off-road due to the bottomless mud. On 8 December 1944 the 37th passed through the old French Maginot Line and took Singling. Two days later it was relieved again, by elements of the 12th Armored Division, and sent to the rear for another rest, although not so far back that elements of the battalion were not in intermittent contact with German forces.

=== Battle of the Bulge ===
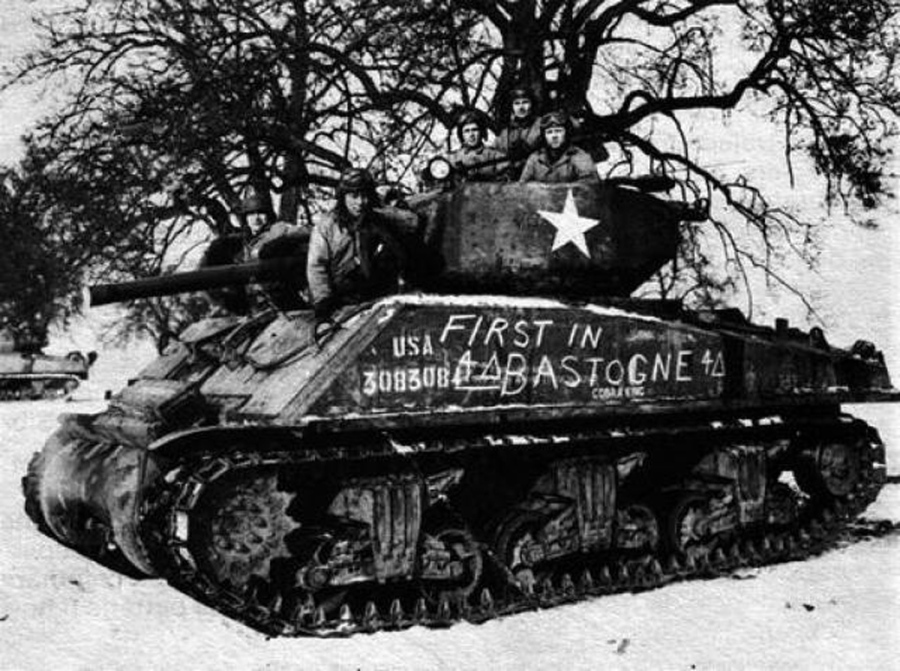
The tank Cobra King, which was operated by Company C of the 37th Tank Battalion during the Battle of the Bulge, and was the first tank to enter the Bastogne perimeter

On 16 December 1944, Sherman tanks of Company A, 37th Tank Battalion were the first 4th Armored Division vehicles to enter Germany when they chased several German tanks back into the woods near Rimling. The same day Company A entered the Reich, Hitler had played his last trump north of where the 4th Armored Division was resting from its five months in action. The German 5th Panzer Army, the last of the German strategic reserves, spearheaded the attack by Field Marshal Model's Army Group B that opened the "Battle of the Bulge". Its objective was the port of Antwerp and allied depots nearby.

On 18 December 1944, the 37th got its march order—to move north against the German penetration, which was causing alarm to the Allied High Command. On the same day, the 101st Airborne Division was moved by truck to establish a strongpoint at the key road and rail junction of Bastogne, in Belgium. By the time the 37th arrived at the south flank of the German penetration, the 101st Airborne was cut off on all sides by the enemy drive. The 37th became the spearhead of the 4th Armored Division's drive to relieve the paratroopers in Bastogne. The 37th moved out in a feathery snowfall at 0600 hours on 22 December 1944, attacking northward against German airborne troops. The 37th Tank Battalion and the 53rd Armored Infantry Battalion made up the 4th Armored Division's Combat Command-B (CCB). In a bloody engagement against German paratroopers wearing American uniforms, CCB took Bigonville.

At 0200 Christmas morning, CCB marched thirty miles west to the 4th Armored Division's left flank. At 0700 the 37th jumped off from Bercheaux and swiftly took Bauxles-Rosieres, Nives and Remoiville. At dawn on 26 December 1944, the 37th struck again, taking Remichampagne, and then seizing the high ground near Chochiment, only three miles from Bastogne. Announcing the plan to relieve the surrounded 101st Airborne Division, LTC Abrams, commanding the 37th, made the undramatic statement, "We're going in to those people now." The lead vehicle in that attack was a Sherman tank nicknamed "Cobra King" and commanded by 1st Lt. Charles Boggess Jr., of Greenville, Illinois. Boggess was the commanding officer of Company C, 37th Tank Battalion. There were but eight other tanks in Company C when the "move out" order came, but at 1515 hours all nine sets of sprockets turned, leading the 37th northward to the embattled 101st Airborne Division.

Two towns lay between the 37th and Bastogne, Clochimont and Assenois, and they were both heavily defended by German troops. Beyond Assenois was a heavy wood, concealing the blockhouses that enclosed the road to Bastogne. Company C's mission was to barge through these defenses in high gear, stopping for nothing and leaving the mopping up to the companies following, which were supported by the 53d Armored Infantry Battalion. At 1645 Lt. Boggess shook hands with 2nd Lt. Webster of Company A, 326th Airborne Engineer Battalion, 101st Airborne Division and in twenty-five minutes Lt.Col. Abrams and his S3, Capt. William Dwight, reported to BG Anthony C. McAuliffe, acting Commanding General of the 101st Airborne Division.

The fight was not over. Lt. Boggess' tank company now consisted of just four M4 Sherman tanks, and the rest of the 37th suffered similarly. By now the 37th was joined by elements of the 26th Infantry Division in fighting to hold the corridor open to Bastogne. Counterattack followed counterattack, until on 9 January 1945, the German penetration had been pushed to the east of Bastogne. The shattered German forces began to withdraw to their homeland. For its relief of Bastogne, the 37th was awarded the Presidential Unit Citation (4th AD cited).

On 10 January 1945, the 37th was attacking east of Bastogne when the order came to halt. After a masterful disengagement and an icy road march south to Luxembourg, the 37th again found itself in the Third Army reserve, ready to answer a fire call.

=== Ardennes Counter-Offensive ===
In the rugged country of the Rhineland, it was mainly an Infantry war, but the 37th followed close behind the attackers, ready to break through the West Wall when a breach was secured. Finally, on 22 February 1945, General Patton unleashed his tanks and Outscheid (24 February), Mioderwinger, Baustert, Feilsdorf, and Koosbrisch quickly fell to the 37th, which was then with Combat Command B under the command of the 80th Division.

On 25 February 1945, Company B, 37th Tank Battalion, with Company B, 51st Armored Infantry Battalion, took the bridge over the Prum at Remesdorf. Companies C of the 37th and 51st took the high ground around Rittersdorf and established a base of fire while the combined A Companies of the two battalions took Rittersdorf and a bridgehead over the Nims River. More than 1,000 prisoners of war were taken in this action. In only four days the 37th had led the 4th AD and the Third Army as it pierced the Siegfried Line. A German counterattack near Sefferweich was repulsed while the 37th rested for the next venture. Farther north, the U.S. First Army was fighting its way into Cologne to set the stage for the dash to the Rhine.

On 5 March 1945 the 37th's M4 tanks attacked through the 5th Infantry Division's bridgehead over the Kyll River and immediately cut across German combat zones to a distance of 13 miles (21 km). On 16 March 1945, LT Joe Liese, the commanding officer of Company B, 37th Tank Battalion, captured General von Rothkirch, commanding general of the German 53rd Army Corps (LIII.Armeekorps). General von Rothkirch was driving his car on an inspection tour near Potzberg, where he stumbled on Company B. By the afternoon of that day, the 37th was even past German artillery positions. Prisoners from the German 10th Woodchopping Battalion surrendered to the advancing tankers. The 37th sped on to Ochtendung, and captured a billeting party from the German Seventh Army rear command post. When almost to the Rhine, LT Liese's tank company overtook a German wheel column and, with assistance from artillery and light aircraft, shot it up badly. Then the 37th moved to the Rhine and took up positions over watching the river.

During the night, remnants of the Wehrmacht tried to get back across the Rhine. In doing so, numerous enemy vehicles stumbled into the 37th's position and were captured or destroyed. On 7 March 1945 the U.S. First Army thrust north from Cologne, pinning what was left of the German Seventh Army between it and the 4th Armored Division. It was in this drive that the U.S. 9th Armored Division captured the Remagen bridge intact. On 8 March 1945, Colonel Abrams left the 37th to command CCB and Major Bautz assumed command of the 37th Tank Battalion. For the next two weeks the 37th was engaged in cleaning out the Palatinate, the triangle formed by the Saar, Rhine and Moselle Rivers. On St. Patrick's Day 1945 the 37th entered the Spa City of Bad Kreuznach, and on 21 March 1945 it returned to the banks of the Rhine at Worms.

On 25 March 1945, the U.S. Third Army crossed the Rhine. The 5th Infantry Division crossed in United States Navy landing craft near Oppenheim before the Germans could fire a shot. When the east bank was secure, a pontoon bridge was quickly constructed, and by 0300 on 26 March 1945, the 37th was across with the rest of the 4th Armored Division. The 37th advanced through the 5th Infantry Division perimeter; by noon Company D's light tanks and Infantry from the 10th Armored Infantry Battalion captured a railroad bridge intact near Aschaffenburg over the Main River. Meanwhile, Combat Command A (CCA) had secured the Main crossing near Hanau. The 37th, with the rest of CCB, sideslipped west and followed CCA across the Main on 28 March 1945. By dusk, the 37th's M4 tanks were in Giessen, 40 miles (64 km) north of Hanau. The Frankfurt-Berlin Autobahn was the 4th Armored Division's axis of advance. The 37th reached Hersfeld (today Bad Hersfeld) the last day of March. On 2 April 1945, under heavy air attack, the 37th crossed the Werra.

=== Task Force Baum ===
In actuality, the entire 37th Tank Battalion did not reach Giessen the night of the 28th, for Company C and one platoon of Company D's tanks had been detached for a special mission called Task Force Baum. They reported on 26 March 1945 to Captain Abraham J. Baum. Besides elements from the 37th, it consisted of Company A, a reconnaissance platoon, and an assault gun platoon from the HQ Company, 10th AIB – all in all 313 soldiers and 57 vehicles. Their mission was to liberate 1,500 American prisoners of war in OFLAG XIII-B, a POW-Camp for officers, located at Hammelburg, sixty miles behind German lines. The orders came directly from General Patton, who wanted to get his son-in-law, LtCol John K. Waters liberated.

At 2100 hours on 26 March, Company B of the 37th and Company B of the 10th AIB punched a hole in the German line at Schweinheim. Through this hole went Task Force Baum (TF Baum), which in turn found itself alone in the enemy area. On 27 March a weak radio transmission was monitored reporting enemy troops marshaling at Gemünden. As Gemunden was three quarter way to Hammelburg, it was an indication that TF Baum was well on its way. Messages later that afternoon told of losing four medium tanks, two officers and eighteen men wounded or killed. Then the messages petered out. On 29 March 1945, 4th Armored Division headquarters reported "No news of Baum". At 2000 hours that night Radio Berlin reported that a great victory had been achieved by the German army near Hammelburg; later reports even claimed annihilation of the entire 4th Armored Division, which was known to the enemy as "Roosevelt's Butchers". On 6 April 1945, by which time the rest of the 37th was deep in Saxony, Company C and Company D's platoon were reported missing in action and replacements for them and their equipment were requisitioned. Finally, on 9 April 1945, Captain Baum returned to American lines and the fate of the task force was determined.

According to the 4th Armored Division history: "...the task force battled through more than two German divisions to the Hammelburg Stalag. On the way, the column took 200 prisoners, including a general and his staff, destroyed enemy troop trains, shot up towns, knocked out German tanks, vehicles and uncounted Germans [Removed racial slur—ed.]. The light force suffered. Bridges were blown in front, both sides and behind the onrushing tanks. A span was blasted as American and German infantrymen fought on it. The task force smashed road blocks, raced down highways, sneaked on back roads and followed compass courses across country."

"When they reached their objective, half of Task Force Baum was left in fighting shape. The armored infantrymen who had not been wounded rode the remaining tanks. Wounded men lay on the gas cans in the half-tracks and helped steady each other at the machine guns. The seriously wounded were left behind with the dead along the side of the road."

Against ever-stiffening resistance by an enemy who thought an entire division had broken through the Main River defense line, Captain Baum's decimated column finally reached the stalag near dark on 27 March 1945. After a fierce fight, the prisoners were released, armed, and mounted on the back decks of Company C's tanks for the ride back to friendly lines. Captain Baum directed the remnants of his force northeastward, but by now the area was swarming with German infantry and armor. By morning of the 28th all the task force's vehicles had been knocked out. The force then broke into groups of four or five and attempted to exfiltrate back to American lines. Thirty-five men finally made it. The rest were killed or captured. Of the 313 officers and men of Task Force Baum, 9 were killed, 32 were wounded, the rest were prisoners at one time or another. Only a few made it back to the US lines, to tell what had happened.

Although they did not accomplish their mission, the tankers and infantry of TF Baum contributed a great deal to the Central Europe Campaign. No less than an entire German corps was diverted to seeking out and achieving the destruction of the two-company American task force.

=== War's end ===
By April 1945 the 37th had driven deep into central Germany when it was relieved by elements of the 80th Infantry Division. The 37th then marched south and drove into Czechoslovakia, where they were when the war ended on 6 May 1945. The 37th then participated in the task of disarming the Wehrmacht and set up shop in Bavaria as part of the occupation forces on 27 May 1945.

=== Occupation of Germany ===
- 37th Tank Battalion relieved 1 May 1946 from assignment to the 4th Armored Division; concurrently converted and redesignated as the 37th Constabulary Squadron and assigned to the 3d Constabulary Regiment.
- Inactivated 20 September 1947 in Germany and relieved from assignment to the 3d Constabulary Regiment

== Cold War ==
=== 37th Tank Battalion ===
- Converted and redesignated 11 December 1951 as the 37th Tank Battalion, still Inactivated.
- Assigned 25 February 1953 to the 4th Armored Division, still Inactivated.
- Activated 15 June 1954 at Fort Hood, Texas
- Inactivated 1 April 1957 at Fort Hood, Texas, and relieved from assignment to the 4th Armored Division
- Link to the 37th Armored Regiment Alumni Page https://courageconquers.com

=== 706th Tank Battalion ===
- 706th Tank Battalion inactivated 20 September 1946 in the Philippine Islands
- Redesignated 25 March 1949 as the 71st Heavy Tank Battalion, assigned to the 1st Cavalry Division, and activated in Japan
- Reorganized and redesignated 5 August 1950 as the 71st Tank Battalion
- Inactivated 16 October 1950 in Korea and relieved from assignment to the 1st Cavalry Division
- Redesignated 14 August 1951 as the 706th Tank Battalion
- Assigned 25 February 1953 to the 12th Armored Division
- Relieved 1 April 1957 from assignment to the 12th Armored Division
- Link to the 37th Armored Regiment Alumni Page https://courageconquers.com

=== Reconsolidation ===
- 37th and 706th Tank Battalions consolidated, reorganized, and redesignated 1 April 1957 as the 37th Armor, a parent regiment under the Combat Arms Regimental System. Concurrently Headquarters and Headquarters & Service Company, 37th Tank Battalion redesignated as HHC, 37th Armor.
- Withdrawn 28 February 1983 from the Combat Arms Regimental System and reorganized under the United States Army Regimental System.

On 11 December 1951, while still on inactive status, the 37th was converted and again designated as the 37th Tank battalion. It was assigned to the 4th Armored Division on 25 February 1953 and then activated on 15 June 1954 with the rest of the division at Fort Hood, Texas.

In April 1957, the Army reinstated its regimental system. As a consequence, the history of the 37th Armor Battalion is now kept by individual battalions of the 37th Armor Regiment.

== Gulf War and War on Terror ==
In a short six-month period during 1990 and 1991, the 37th Armor, was alerted for deployment to Operation Desert Shield/Desert Storm, deployed all of its personnel and equipment over 3,000 miles (4,800 km) from an already forward deployed location, fought a major battle against a well equipped enemy over terrain they had never trained on and then redeployed the unit to its home station

In response to the Global War on Terror 37th Armor deployed to Iraq in 2003 and again in 2006. During those deployments the unit was instrumental in the Battle of Karbala in 2004 and the Battle of Ramadi in 2006. Additionally the unit was involved in direct combat action in Baghdad, Falluja, and the Ninewa Province. 1-37 Armor was awarded the Presidential and Navy Unit citations due to these deployments.

== Units ==
Battalions of a regiment are typically abbreviated as, for example, "4–37 AR BN", which is usually verbalized as "Four Three Seven Armor" (but sometimes as "4th of the 37th Armor" (archaic)). This would be the 4th Battalion of the 37th Armor Regiment, even though in the modern United States Army, regiments exist mostly for heraldic purposes, as opposed to operational purposes.

=== 1st Battalion ===
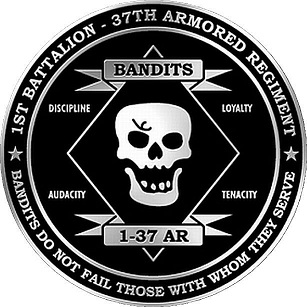
Unofficial 1st Battalion-37th Armored Regiment (Bandit Battalion) logo.

1–37 Armor was stationed at McKee Barracks in Crailsheim, Germany, from Jan 1958 to June 1966. During the period July 1966 – July 1969, the battalion moved to Hindenburg Kaserne in Ansbach, Germany. However, from July 1969 to May 1988, the battalion was stationed at Bismarck Kaserne in Katterbach, Germany. In May 1988, the battalion moved to Rose Barracks in Vilseck, Germany. Following redesignation in Feb 1997, the battalion was stationed at Ray Barracks in Friedberg, Germany until Inactivation 8 May 2007. In July 2008 the battalion was re-activated at Fort Bliss, Texas. 1–37 Armor inactivated on 1/11/2011 at Fort Bliss, Texas. In June 2015, 1-37 Armor was reactivated at Fort Bliss Texas where it is stationed today. The most recent 1–37 Armor called themselves the 'Bandits'. The Cold War/Desert Storm era 1–37 AR from Vilseck, Germany was nicknamed Dragon Battalion. The Courage Conquers motto traces its history to WWII. Abrams' Standards was founded in 1982. Bandits never fail those with whom they serve - traces its history to the 4-67 Armor Bandits before it was reflagged 1-37 Armor in Feb 1997. The 37th Armor Alumni Association conducts annual reunions with former soldiers and leaders of four 37th Armor battalions. The Alumni consists of more than 2,700 37th Armor Veterans from all eras of the fabled unit's history (since 1941). Link to the 37th Armored Regiment Alumni Page https://courageconquers.com

==== World War II ====
- Constituted 13 January 1941 in the Regular Army as 7th Armored Regiment
- Activated 15 April 1941 at Fort Drum, Pine Camp, New York; as part of the 4th Armored Division (activated 15 April 1941)
- Redesignated 8 May 1941 as 37th Armored Regiment
- Reorganized and redesignated 10 September 1943 as the 37th Tank Battalion

==== Occupation of Germany ====
- Converted and redesignated 1 May 1946 as Troop A, 37th Constabulary Squadron, an element of the 3d Constabulary Regiment
- Inactivated 20 September 1947 in Germany, and relieved from assignment to the 3d Constabulary Regiment

==== Cold War ====
- Converted and redesignated 11 December 1951 as Company A, 37th Tank Battalion, still Inactivated.
- 37th Tank Battalion assigned 25 February 1953 to the 4th Armored Division, still Inactivated.
- Activated 15 June 1954 at Fort Hood, Texas
- Reorganized and redesignated 1 April 1957 as Headquarters and Headquarters Company, 1st Medium Tank Battalion, 37th Armor, an element of the 4th Armored Division (organic elements concurrently constituted and activated)
- Reorganized and redesignated 12 August 1963 as the 1st Battalion, 37th Armor
- Relieved 10 May 1971 from assignment to the 4th Armored Division and assigned to the 1st Armored Division.

==== Desert Storm ====
In a short six-month period during 1990 and 1991, the 1st Battalion, 37th Armor, was deployed for Operation Desert Shield/Desert Storm, It deployed all of its personnel and equipment over 3,000 miles (4,800 km) from an already forward deployed location, fought a major battle against a well equipped enemy over terrain they had never trained on and then redeployed the unit to its home station.

The 1st Battalion 37th Armor (1st Armored Division) from Rose Barracks, Vilseck, Germany, commanded by LTC Edward L. Dyer, was alerted for deployment to the Persian Gulf on 8 November 1990. 1–37 Armor was the first brigade unit from Vilseck to deploy. 1–37 Armor was attached to the 3rd "Bulldog" Brigade from Warner Barracks in Bamberg, Germany, under their former commander, Colonel Daniel Zannini. A small advance party deployed on 14 December and the main body began departing on 26 December. By 30 December, the battalion had arrived in Saudi Arabia. Vehicles and equipment which had been shipped from ports in Europe began to arrive on 4 January and by 12 January all the equipment had arrived. When hostilities commenced on 15 January 1991, the battalion was in the process of closing the last elements into TAA Thompson. The next month was spent task organizing, training, rehearsing, and preparing for the ground war.

On 24 February, Task Force 1–37 crossed the line of departure as part of VII Corps' attack against Iraqi forces. On 25 February, the battalion attacked and seized the division headquarters of the Iraqi 26th Infantry Division destroying four armored vehicles, eight air defense weapons and captured over forty Enemy Prisoners of War (EPW). After attacking all day on 26 February, TF 1–37, part of 3rd Brigade, 1st Armored Division, made contact with a brigade of the Tawakalna Armored Division of the Republican Guard Forces Command (RGFC) which had established a defensive position to protect the flank of the RGFC and facilitate their escape from Kuwait. After a thirty-minute fire fight, TF 1–37 was ordered to assault the enemy position. The assault, conducted at night, in driving rain, resulted in the destruction of twenty-six T-72 tanks, 47 armored personnel carriers (mostly BMP's) and a handful of other vehicles, as well as the capture of over one hundred EPWs. TF 1–37 suffered the loss of four M1A1 tanks destroyed and six personnel wounded in action. After consolidation and reorganization, the task force continued the attack throughout the night of 26–27 February, reestablishing contact with the RGFC at approximately 0530, 27 February. The task force continued to attack, fighting numerous engagements with elements of multiple Iraqi divisions throughout the 27th and into the morning of 28 February. At 0800 local time, 28 February, the task force established a hasty defensive position astride the Iraq-Kuwait border. During the last 28 hours of the attack, TF 1–37 destroyed an additional thirty-one tanks, thirty-one BMPs, numerous other APCs, air defense weapons and trucks, and captured over 200 EPWs.

Four days after the cease fire, TF 1–37 moved nine miles (14 km) further into Kuwait. Two missions were conducted to destroy additional enemy weapons, ammunition and equipment, bury enemy remains, and to recover the four M1A1's which had been destroyed on 26 February.

On 24 March, TF 1–37 moved back into Iraq and established a defensive position in the vicinity of the Rumayilah oil fields. For the next three weeks, task force missions centered on refugee assistance and security operations. On 10 April, TF 1–37 began movement to the Rear Assembly Area (RAA) in the vicinity of King Khalid Military City (KKMC), Saudi Arabia. By 13 April, the task force had closed into the RAA and preparations began for the redeployment of the unit to Germany.

On 16 August 1991 the 1st Brigade, 1st Armored Division was reflagged as the 3d Brigade, 3d Infantry Division.

==== Peacetime ====
- Relieved 17 January 1992 from assignment to the 1st Armored Division and assigned to the 3d Infantry Division
- Inactivated 15 February 1996 in Germany and relieved from assignment to the 3d Infantry Division
- Assigned 17 February 1997 to the 1st Armored Division and activated in Germany.
- Inactivated 11 January 2011 at Fort Bliss, Texas and relieved from assignment to the 1st Armored Division (United States)
- Activated 18 June 2015 at Fort Bliss, Texas

==== Global War on Terror ====
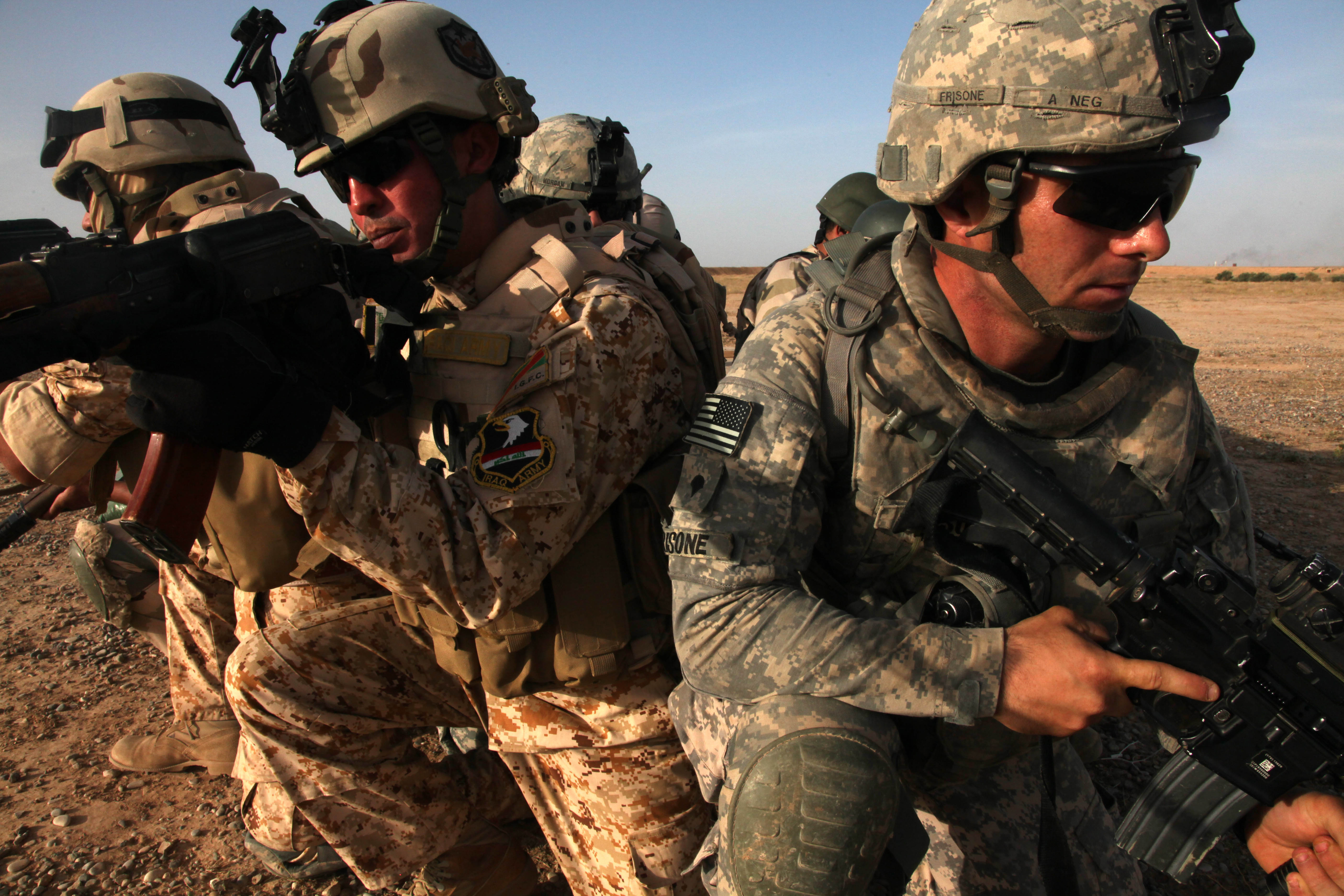
Soldiers from Delta Company, 1st Battalion, 37th Armor Regiment and Iraqi soldiers from the 47th Army Brigade train for an aerial reconnaissance force mission near Hawijah, Iraq, on May 22, 2010

On 10 May 2003, 1-37 Armor Battalion left Ray Barracks in Friedberg, Germany and deployed to Iraq. Upon arrival in Baghdad in early June, 1st Battalion quickly established their forward operating base (FOB) on Baghdad Island, a small peninsula on the Tigris River, and formerly a recreational resort and amusement park for the elite of Saddam Hussein's Regime. Over the course of the next eleven months, the soldiers of 1st Battalion conducted thousands of area security patrols, and several hundred operations ranging in size from a few dozen men to an enormous brigade level operation on Christmas Eve, 2003 which involved over 1000 soldiers from the 1st Brigade of the 1st Armored Division conducting a cordon and search operation of a large neighborhood in north central Baghdad.

Upon receiving orders for a 90-day extension of their one-year deployment in April 2004, 1st Battalion moved 45 miles (72 km) to the south of Baghdad to the ancient city of Karbala, which had recently fallen to the control of members of the Mahdi Army, followers of the radical Shi'ite cleric Muqtada al-Sadr. After several days of shaping operations, the battalion captured an abandoned hotel in the center of the city and began using it as a strong point from which to conduct operations. Over the next ten days, the battalion engaged in some of the most intense urban warfare experienced by a single unit of the US Army since World War II. After driving the remnants of the Mahdi Army from Karbala, the BN then engaged in several weeks of civil-military operations before returning to Baghdad to prepare for the trip home to Germany. 1st Battalion, 37th Armored was awarded their second Presidential Unit Citation for their actions in Karbala.

In January 2006, the battalion again deployed again as a part of the Operation Iraqi Freedom 05-07 rotation. Initially operating in western Nineveh Province, the battalion reorganized into "Task Force Bandits" and then partnered with the 1st Brigade, 3rd Iraqi Division and the 4thBrigade, Iraqi Border Police to conduct combined area security operations, build Iraqi security force capabilities, and conduct civil military operations in a large area along the Syrian border. During this time, the Task Force validated two of three partnered Iraqi Army battalions and was the first in the brigade to transition an area to Iraqi control. Meanwhile, A co. (known as the Axemen) detached and alongside 1-36 INF fought a smaller but equally fierce enemy in Hit.

The Task Force's mission on the border ended in May 2006, when the it was ordered south to the volatile Al Anbar province to spearhead the pacification of its capital city, Ar Ramadi. Upon arrival, the Task Force gallantly assaulted across the Nasir Canal and established a series of six combat outposts deep within enemy held territory. Operating from these outposts during nine months of intense combat, Task Force Bandits drove Al Qaeda in Iraq from their sanctuary and inflicted grievous losses on the enemy. For these actions fighting under U.S. Marine Corps command, the battalion was awarded a Naval Unit Commendation. After a 45 day extension in Iraq, the battalion returned to Friedberg in February 2007 and deactivated the following April 2007.

On 27 October 2008, 1st BN, 37th Armored was re-activated at Fort Bliss, Texas as part of 1AD's redeployment to the Continental United States (CONUS). 1–37 Armor deployed once again to Iraq in November 2009. As 1st Brigade, 1st Armored Division converted to a Stryker brigade, 1–37 Armor deactivated on 11 January 2011. On 18 June 2015, 1-37 Armor was reactivated at Fort Bliss, Texas as part of 2nd Brigade, 1AD.

=== 2nd Battalion ===
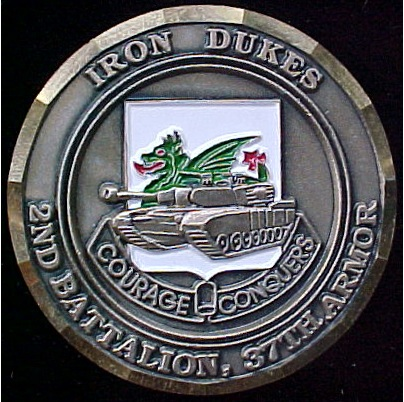
2nd Battalion, 37th Armored Regiment

The 2nd Battalion, 37th Armored Regiment, known as the Iron Dukes, or simply Dukes, was a forward deployed tank battalion located in the Federal Republic of Germany. The unit was nestled in the rolling hills of the German State of Hessen, in the city of Friedberg. It occupied Ray Barracks along with 1st Battalion, 36th Infantry Regiment; 501st Forward Support Battalion; Headquarters, 1st Brigade; and its sister battalion; 1st Battalion, 37th Armored Regiment. As a member of the Ready First Combat Team, it was one of many units that make up the 1st Armored Division. In May 2003, the Dukes deployed from Ray Barracks to central Baghdad, Iraq, for a 15-month mission in support of Operation Iraqi Freedom. By February 2007, the "Iron Dukes" had returned from their second tour in Iraq, during which they served in the city of Tal Afar, and later to Ar Ramadi. The 2nd Battalion, 37th Armored Regiment was inactivated in April 2007. The battalion re-activated during a ceremony at Fort Bliss on 20 June 2019, as the Ready First Combat Team (1st Brigade, 1st Armored Division) re-equipped from a Stryker to an armored brigade. Link to the 37th Armored Regiment Alumni Page https://courageconquers.com

==== History ====
===== World War II =====
- Constituted 13 January 1941 in the Regular Army as the Company B, 7th Armored Regiment, an element of the 4th Armored Division
- Activated 15 April 1941 at Fort Drum, Pine Camp, New York
- Redesignated 8 May 1941 as Company B, 37th Armored Regiment
- Reorganized and redesignated 10 September 1943 as Company B, 37th Tank Battalion

===== Occupation of Germany =====
- Converted and redesignated 1 May 1946 as Troop B, 37th Constabulary Squadron, an element of the 3d Constabulary Regiment
- Inactivated 20 September 1947 in Germany, and relieved from assignment to the 3d Constabulary Regiment

=== 3rd Battalion ===
==== History ====
The 3rd Battalion, 37th Armored Regiment saw combat in the Persian Gulf War from 24 February 1991 through 4 March 1991 organized as Task Force 3/37th Armor, the unit was composed of HHC, B, and C Companies, 3/37th Armor; A and D Company, Second Battalion, Sixteenth Infantry; First Platoon of B Company and Second Platoon of C Company, Second Battalion, Third Air Defense Artillery; C Company, First Engineer Battalion; and Ground Surveillance Radar Team B, One Hundred and First Military Intelligence Battalion. As part of the 2nd Brigade of the 1st Infantry Division and VII Corps main effort, Task Force 3/37th Armor breached the Iraqi defense on 24 February 1991, clearing four passage lanes and expanding the gap under direct enemy fire. The Task Force then attacked 300 kilometers across southern Iraq into northern Kuwait, severing Iraqi lines of communication, and then drove north once again into Iraq to assist in the seizure of the City of Safwan, Iraq, and the securing of the Safwan Airfield; the Scout Platoon (HHC,3/37 AR) was part of the guard force under command of 1LT Craig Borchelt for the Coalition Forces-Iraqi Cease-Fire negotiations. During the operation, over fifty enemy combat vehicles were destroyed and over 1700 prisoners were captured. Throughout the Ground War, the soldiers performed with marked distinction under difficult and hazardous conditions. Their gallantry, determination, and Esprit de Corps guaranteed victory and maintained the finest traditions of the United States Army.

After the Gulf War, the Dauntless Battalion continued to serve at Fort Riley as part of the 2nd Brigade Combat Team (Dagger), 1st Infantry Division from 1991 to 1996. In March 1996, Lieutenant Colonel Ronald G. Houle and Command Sergeant Major Craig Salminen cased the battalion's colors as the unit was re-designated as the 1st Battalion, 13th Armored Regiment as part of the 1st Infantry Division's move to Germany (2/1 ID reflagged to the 3rd Brigade Combat Team, 1st Armored Division). Although the 3-37AR's service on Custer Hill at Riley came to an end- its former Soldiers still proudly maintain its memory and pay tribute to its rich heritage as a U.S. Army armored unit. Courage Conquers- NO SLACK! Link to the 37th Armored Regiment Alumni Page https://courageconquers.com

=== 4th Battalion ===
The 4th Battalion is known as the Thunderbolts, a name taken from the name of LTC Abrams' tank during World War II.

==== History ====
Some of its component units were stationed in West Germany in the 1960s, home base being Fort Knox Ky, attached to the 194th Armor BDE throughout the nineteen sixties and seventies. It supported the Armor school and rotated as an alert unit for El Dorado Canyon. 4–37 AR saw combat in the Persian Gulf War as part of the 2nd Brigade of the 1st Infantry Division.

== Heraldry ==
=== Distinctive unit insignia ===
- Description: A silver color metal and enamel device 1 1/8 inches (2.9 cm) in height overall consisting of a shield blazoned: Argent, a wyvern glissant, sans legs, tail nowed Vert, langued, eyed and barbed Gules. Attached below the shield a silver motto scroll inscribed "COURAGE CONQUERS" in black letters.
- Symbolism: The shield is green and white (silver), the colors of the Armored Force. The wyvern is representative of the deadliness of the tank.
- Background: The Distinctive Unit Insignia was originally approved for the 37th Armored Regiment on 1 June 1942. It was redesignated for the 37th Tank Battalion on 12 November 1943. On 29 November 1946 it was redesignated the 37th Constabulary Squadron. Due to the unit inactivation, the distinctive unit insignia was redesignated for the 37th Tank Battalion on 30 November 1953. Effective 28 January 1958, the insignia was redesignated for the 37th Armor.

=== Coat of arms ===
- Blazon:
  - Shield: Argent, a wyvern glissant, sans legs, tail nowed Vert, langued, eyed and barbed Gules.
  - Crest: On a wreath Argent and Vert, between two triton shells Gules and surmounting an annulet Sable fimbriated of the first flamant of the third, three spearheads of the first each bearing in base an ermine spot of the fourth.
  - Motto: Courage Conquers
- Symbolism:
  - Shield: The shield is green and white, the colors of the Armored Force. The wyvern is representative of the deadliness of the tank.
  - Crest: The three spearheads stand for the three outstanding combat achievements in World War II for which the unit was awarded streamers embroidered "Ardennes", "Normandy", and "Moselle River." They refer to the organization's claim to the title "Point of the Spearhead." The ermine spots are from the arms of Nantes, Brittany the first city to be taken by the unit. From Nantes the organizations launched its extraordinary blitzkrieg across Europe. The annulet ringed with flames represents Bastogne surrounded by enemy fire (See also Battle of the Bulge). It commemorates the unit's spearheading the 4th Armored Division into Bastogne on 26 December 1944. The above action was the famed 130-mile (210 km) "fire call" which relieved the besieged city and triggered the Ardennes counter-offensive. Triton shells were used as trumpets by early inhabitants of the Pacific Islands. They were scarlet in reference to the color of the Meritorious Unit Commendation streamer awarded to the unit for service in the Pacific Theater.
- Background: The coat of arms was originally approved for the 37th Armored Regiment on 1 June 1942. It was redesignated for the 37th Tank Battalion on 12 November 1943. On 26 November 1946 it was redesignated the 37th Constabulary Squadron. Due to the unit inactivation, the coat of arms was redesignated for the 37th Tank Battalion on 30 November 1953. Effective 28 January 1958, the insignia was redesignated for the 37th Armor. The coat of arms was amended on 6 August 1965 to add the crest.

== Campaign participation credit ==
- World War II:

Normandy
Northern France
Rhineland
Ardennes-Alsace
Central Europe
Western Pacific
Leyte
Ryukyu Islands

- Korean War:

UN Defensive
UN Offensive

- Southwest Asia:

Defense of Saudi Arabia
Liberation and Defense of Kuwait
Desert Storm Cease Fire

Operation Iraqi Freedom

== Unit awards ==
1. Presidential Unit Citation (Army), WWII, 22 Dec 44 - 27 Mar 45 (4th AD, ARDENNES)
2. Presidential Unit Citation (Army) for KARBALA-KUFA-NAJAF: OIF 2003-2004
3. Navy Unit Commendation (Army) for AL ANBAR PROVINCE: OIF 2006-2007
4. Joint Meritorious Unit Award for IRAQ-KUWAIT
5. Valorous Unit Award for Operation Desert Storm
6. Army Superior Unit Award for 1994–1995
7. French Croix de guerre with Palm, WWII, 27–30 July 44 (4th AD, NORMANDY)
8. French Croix de guerre with Palm, WWII, 12-29 Sept 44 (4th AD, MOSELLE RIVER)
9. French Fourragere (Croix de Guerre colors), WWII (4th AD)

== See also ==
- List of armored and cavalry regiments of the United States Army
- Military career of Elvis Presley
