= George Henry Palmer =

American Civil War Medal of Honor recipient (1840–1901)

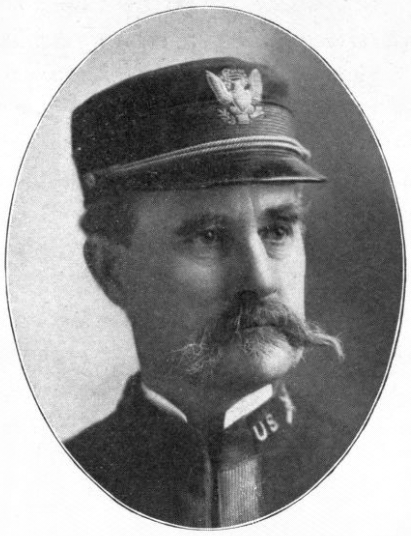
- Born: April 16, 1841; Leonardsville, New York, U.S.
- Died: April 7, 1901 (aged 60); Harrison, Illinois, U.S.
- Burial place: Arlington National Cemetery, Arrington County, Virginia, U.S.
- Education: Monmouth College
- Military career
- Allegiance: United States; Union
- Branch: United States Army; Union Army
- Rank: Major
- Units: Company G, 1st Illinois Volunteer Cavalry
- Conflicts: American Civil War
- Awards: Medal of Honor

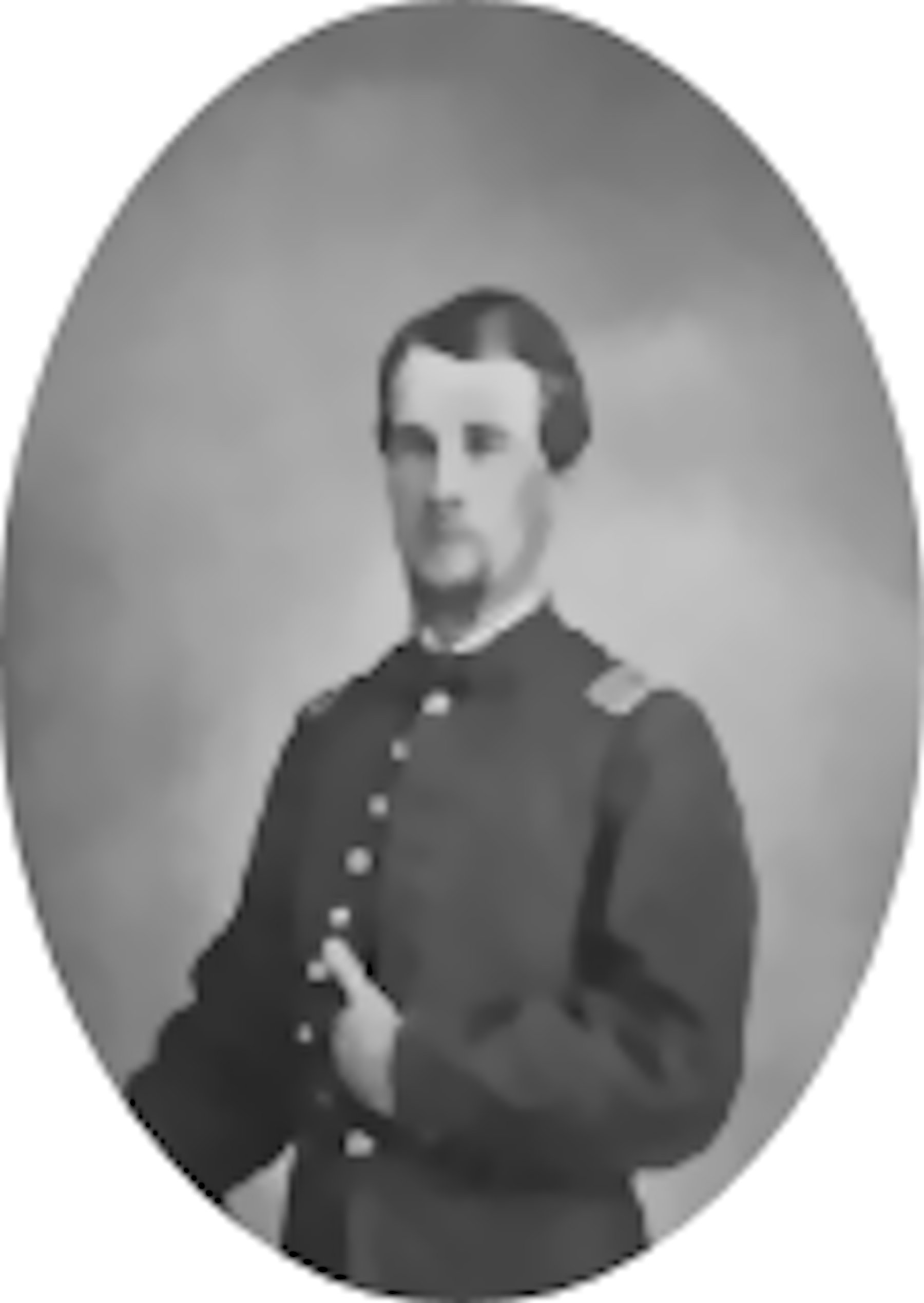
Palmer c. 1865

George Henry Palmer (April 16, 1841 – April 7, 1901) was an American bugler in the 1st Illinois Volunteer Cavalry during the American Civil War. He received the country's highest award for bravery during combat, the Medal of Honor, for his action while fighting for the North at Lexington, Missouri, on September 20, 1861. He was honored with the award on March 10, 1896.

== Early life and education ==
Palmer was born April 16, 1841, in Leonardsville, New York. His family moved to Monmouth, Illinois, in 1845. He lived in Monmouth until 1855 when he went to live with his grandfather (Harding) at West Winfield, New York, where he attended the West Winfield Academy. He returned to Monmouth in 1857, enrolling in Monmouth College with the class of 1861. During the summer of 1860 he went to Chicago to attend Sloanes Commercial College (located on Washington Street near the Court House). He also worked for a farmer in McHenry County, and, being a Republican, he campaigned for the election of Abraham Lincoln. He returned to Monmouth in the autumn of 1860.

== Military career ==
Palmer was of military stock. His great-grandfather was a colonel in the Revolutionary War and was at Saratoga at Burgoyne's surrender. His grandfather was a major general of the New York state militia. His father was Paymaster and Captain of Dragoons, commissioned by William H. Seward, governor of New York. He was also an officer of cavalry in the Mexican–American War and captain of the First Illinois Cavalry during the American Civil War.

In April 1861 he enlisted with the 17th Illinois Infantry and was the first man from Warren County to do so. When the Civil War broke out, many students, faculty, and administrators of Monmouth College enlisted in the military. In the end, another Monmouth College classmate along with Palmer would receive the Medal of Honor related to actions during the Civil War, or as Palmer referred to it in his journal, "the war of the Rebellion".

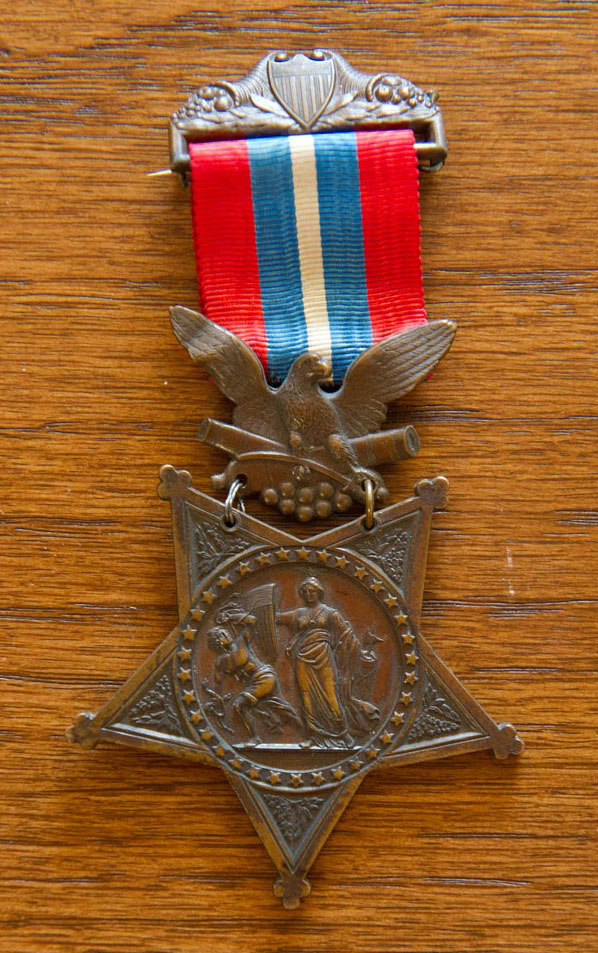
Medal of Honor presented to Palmer in 1896

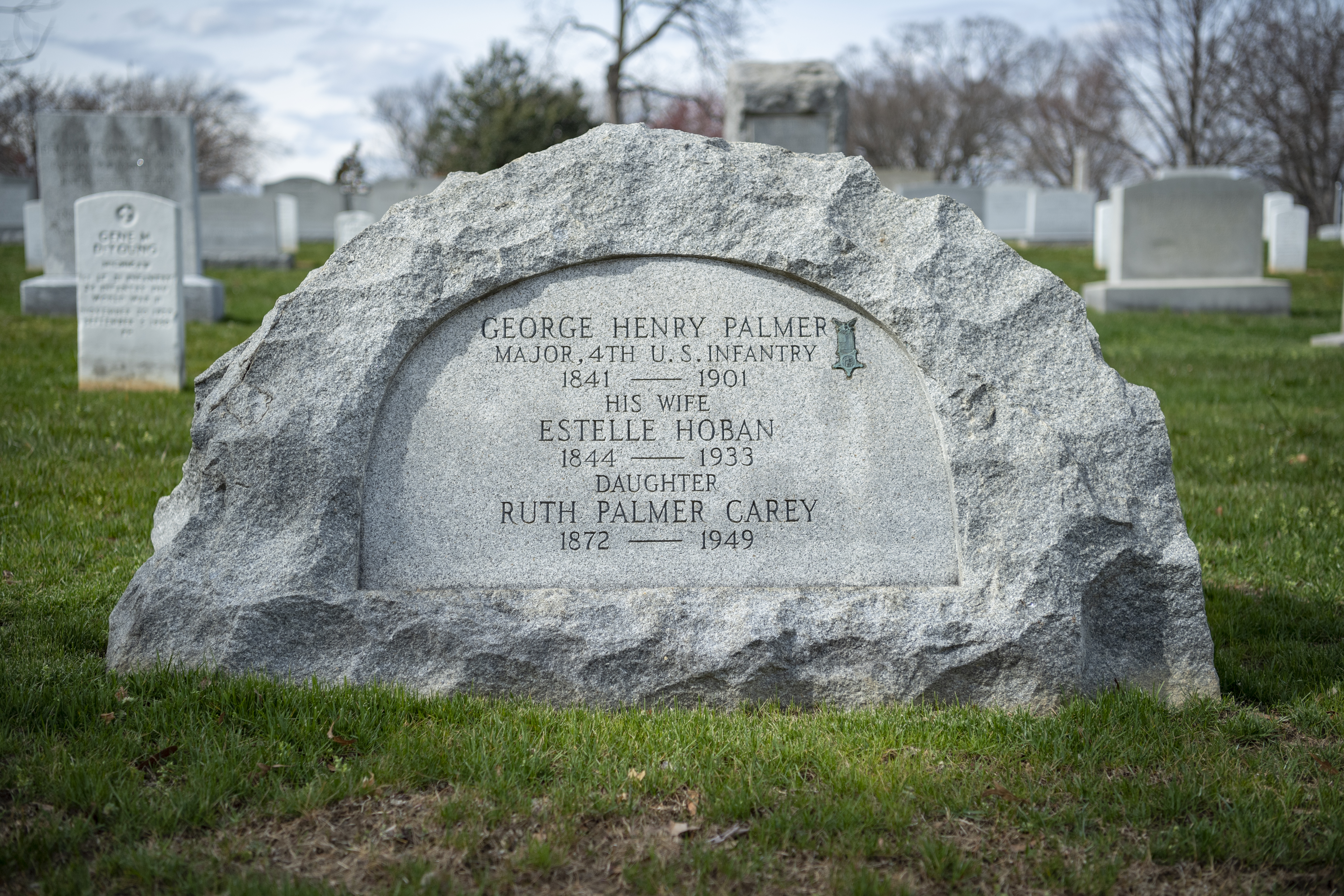
Grave at Arlington National Cemetery

The medal was presented to him on March 10, 1896. The citation read: "Volunteered to fight in the trenches and also led a charge which resulted in the recapture of a Union hospital, together with Confederate sharpshooters then occupying the same." His actions also resulted in "the capture of rebel sharpshooters then occupying the hospital while serving as bugler." Amid a backdrop of Confederate soldiers having violated the rules of war by taking possession of an enemy hospital housing both sick and wounded soldiers (and opening fire upon Union soldiers trying to rescue them), Palmer recalled that critical day in September 1861 with the following notation in his journal.

On the 19th the Rebels took our hospital just outside our west line. The house was built of brick and afforded a good position for them to fire from the upper story. They fired directly into our trenches and after killing and wounding a number of our men. Genl. Mulligan saw that they must be dislodged. He sent two companies of his Regiment down through our works on the charge to drive them out. They came along on the run and just as they emerged from our line of trench ... I joined them in the charge. We reached into the building and drove the enemy from the lower floor some of them running toward the river and some running up the stairs. They kept up a fire from the upper story and from the direction of the River so that many were killed and wounded of our party. After getting possession of the lower floor we were no better off than we would have been had we nothing at all of the house. I saw the officers trying to get their men to go up the broad stairway to drive the enemy from the upper story. With urging and ordering and threatening no one offered to take the lead up the stairs. It looked like a desperate attempt. I was now filled with dash and enthusiasm. I ran forward and jumped onto the second step of the stairs and turned to the men and said "If you will follow me I will lead you! We must drive them out!" They cheered and came forward like dear brave men as they were. And on we went with a yell and a rush. We went to the doors which were closed and locked. I knocked open one door with the butt end of my musket and stepped into the room, there were five Rebs there 2 of whom raised their guns to shoot me. I yelled at them to surrender which they at once did after seeing the men behind me. I had five prisoners and five guns. I took all the guns in my arms and ordered the prisoners to march.

Palmer later entered the regular Army and provided service in the Spanish–American War, after which he was promoted to the rank of major, serving with the 4th United States Infantry. He retired February 27, 1899.

He died at his home in Harrison, Winnebago County, Illinois on April 7, 1901. He was buried at Arlington National Cemetery, in Arlington, Virginia. His son Bruce Palmer, Brigadier General, United States Army, and his grandson, Bruce Palmer Jr., a general in the United States Army, are also buried in Arlington National Cemetery. His daughter, Ruth Palmer, was the wife of Colonel Edward Colby Carey, the son of Brigadier General Asa B. Carey.
