= Cobra King (tank) =

American WWII tank first to enter Bastogne

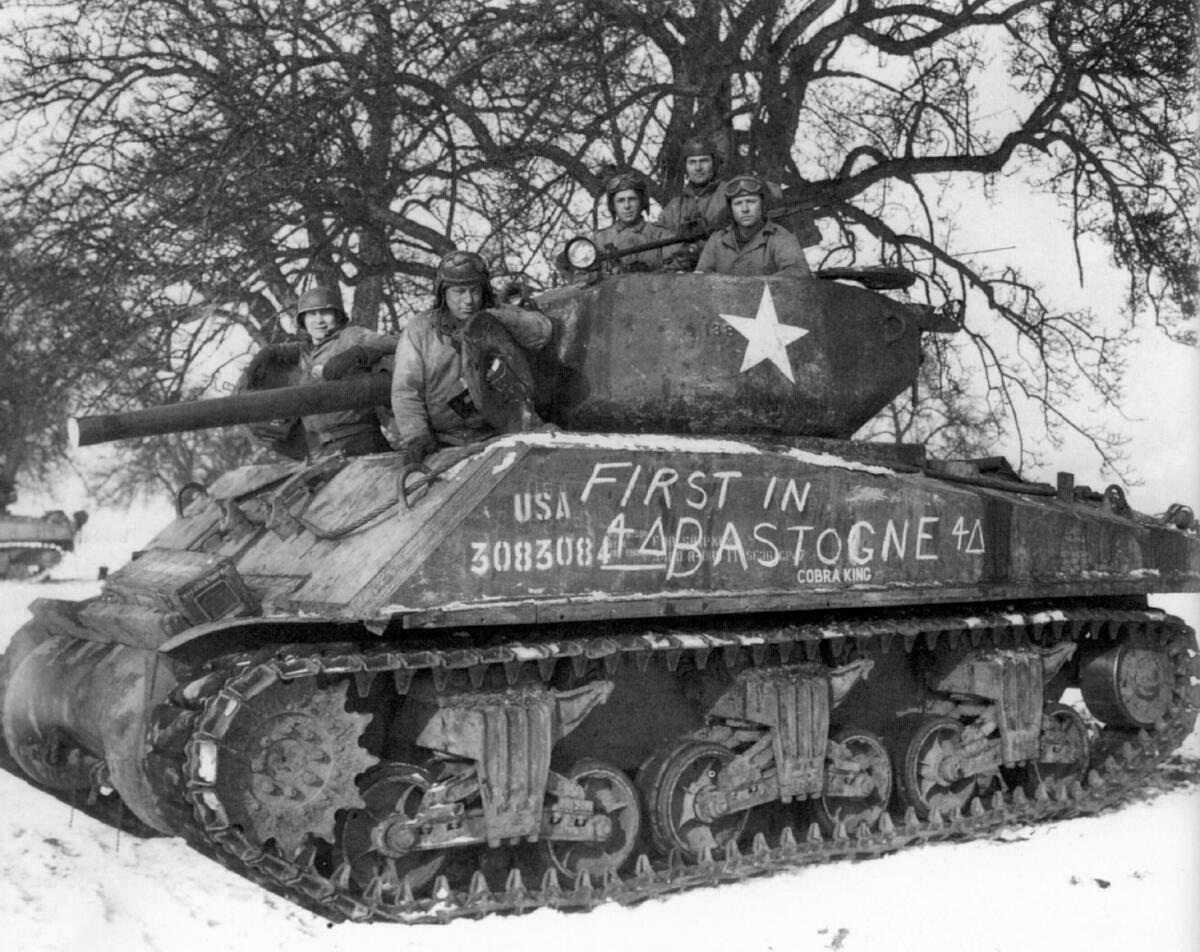
- Cobra King shortly after the Battle of Bastogne
- Type: M4 Sherman "Jumbo"
- Place of origin: United States

Service history
- In service: 1944–27 March 1945
- Wars: World War II

Production history
- Designer: U.S. Army Ordnance Department
- Designed: 1940
- Manufacturer: Fisher Tank Arsenal

Specifications
- Crew: 5 (commander, gunner, loader, driver, assistant driver/bow gunner)
- Armor: 4.0 inches (100 mm)
- Main armament: 75 mm gun M3 (90–104 rounds)
- Engine: Ford GAA V8 gasoline engine 450 horsepower (340 kW) at 2,600 rpm
- Transmission: Spicer manual synchromesh transmission, 5 forward and 1 reverse gears
- Ground clearance: 17 inches (43 cm)
- Maximum speed: 22 mph (35 km/h)

Cobra King is an American Sherman tank of World War II. (Note: Specifically, a "Jumbo" (M4A3E2 assault tank) version, equipped with extra armor including an additional 1 inch (25 mm) of frontal armor Jumbos were a little slower than regular Sherman Tanks, but better protected against anti-tank weapons.) During the Battle of the Bulge in December 1944, the Germans had attacked a weakly defended section of the Allied line and surrounded American forces in the town of Bastogne. Cobra King was the first tank to enter the Bastogne perimeter in relief of the besieged American 101st Airborne Division.

== War service ==
Cobra King (Note: "Cobra King" is a nickname bestowed by the crew, not an official Army designation. The practice was for these names to start with the letter of the vehicle's company, thus Cobra King as she was in Company C.) was first used in combat in 1944. It was knocked out during fighting in France during November 1944, and later repaired and re-issued.

In late 1944 the tank was assigned to Company C of the 37th Tank Battalion of the American 4th Armored Division, which was the spearhead of General Patton's Third Army racing toward Bastogne. The 37th was then under the command of Creighton Abrams, later commander of American forces in the Vietnam War, Chief of Staff of the United States Army, and namesake of the M1 Abrams tank. Cobra King's commander was Lieutenant Charles Boggess, heading a crew of Hubert S. Smith (driver), Harold Hafner (co-driver), Milton Jafet (gunner), and James G. Murphy (loader). Boggess had replaced the tank's previous commander, Charles Trover, who had been killed by a sniper on 23 December while he was standing in the turret.

On 26 December 1944, Cobra King led its company in intense fighting in the village of Assenois. After fighting through the town, it made contact with the American 326th Airborne Engineer Battalion, at 4:50pm. With this, the German encirclement was finally broken, although it took several more days until supply lines to the south were firmly established.

[T]he tank crew spotted some soldiers in the distance who through binoculars looked like Americans. But the tankers were wary because infiltrating German troops were said to be dressed as Americans. Finally, an American soldier strode to the tank, stuck his hand out to Boggess, and said "Glad to see you".

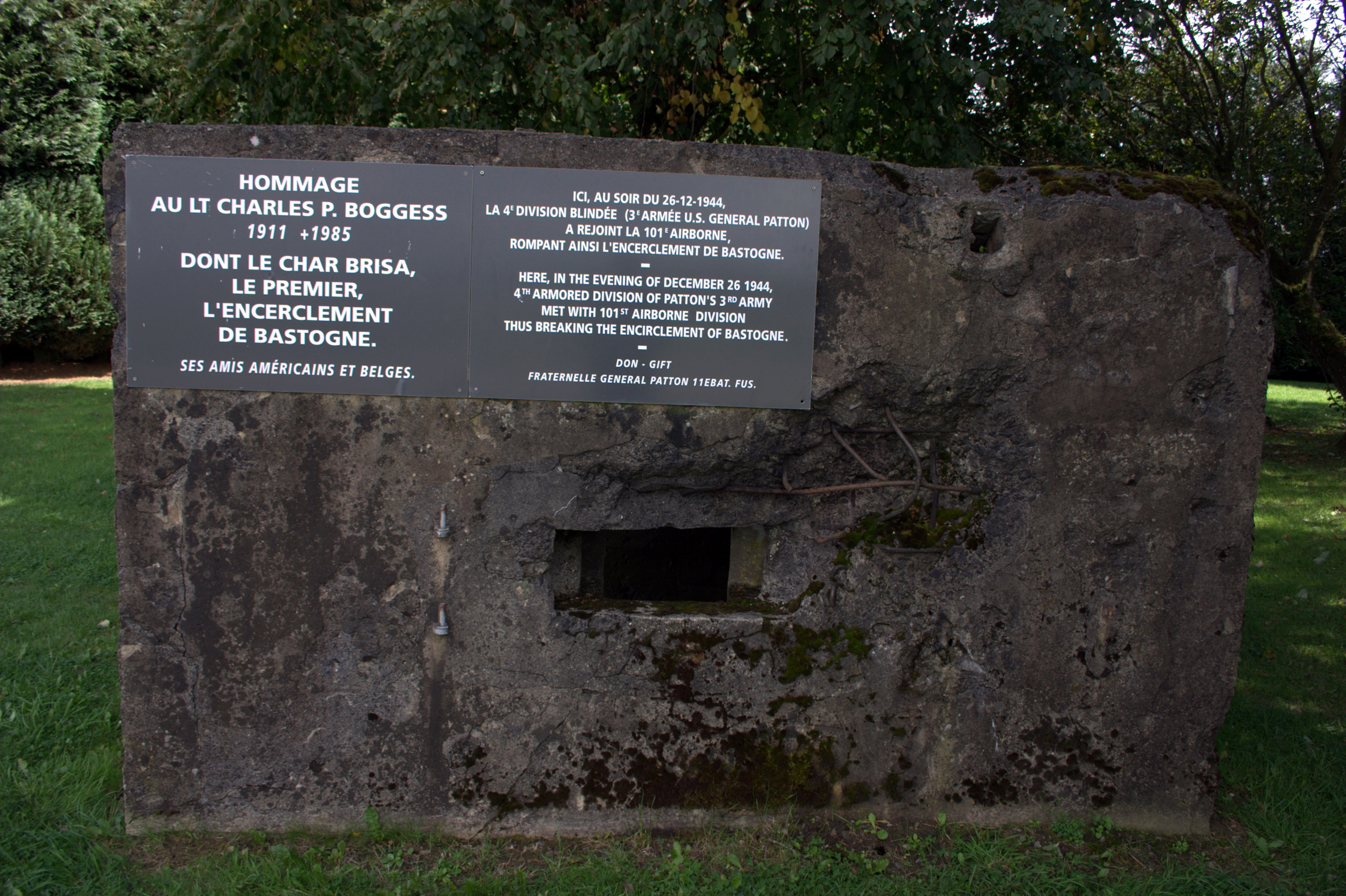
Bunker near Assenois Belgium where Cobra King met 101st Airborne to break through to Bastogne.

Shortly after the Battle of the Bulge Cobra King was rearmed with a 76 mm gun then fought on into Germany. Within a short time in the field, the chalk legend "First In Bastogne" was weathered off, and it later gained a new crew, and the identity and historic status of the tank was largely lost.

Cobra King was part of Task Force Baum, Patton's controversial and failed attempt to liberate the prison camp Oflag XIII-B. (Note: According to most sources, including Jennings, Fox (2020, p. 192), Baron (2000, p. ?) and the National Museum itself. But according to James George, Len Dyer (director of the Patton Museum and later director of the National Cavalry Museum at Fort Benning, and a member of the restoration project) has said that this is not incontrovertibly established although it is supported by a good deal of evidence (for instance, the tank's company participated in the raid, Captain Baum mentioned a tank named Cobra King in his postwar account, and there are photographs of a disabled Jumbo shortly after the war at an American transportation center in Hammelburg) and forensic analysis. But dissenter Peter Domes, an amateur who (with Martin Heinlein) has engaged in years of extensive research specifically on the mission and is author of Task Force Baum: Behind Enemy Lines, no Jumbos were included in Task Force Baum because they would have been too slow for the mission. Charles Lemons, Curator of the Patton Museum of Cavalry and Armor when the vehicle arrived at Fort Knox, had conversations with both CPT Baum and COL James Leach (who was Company Commander of Co. B, 37th Tank Bn at the time of the Raid). CPT Baum, when asked about tank types simply stated that he was an infantryman and his column included "Big Tanks and Little Tanks". COL Leach stated that C Company was selected because it had the most tanks operational and that the Sherman Jumbo was never considered too slow for combat operations and no commander in his right mind would leave a functional tank behind, especially when his company was short of vehicles.) All the tanks of the task force were destroyed; according to Army historian Patrick R. Jennings, Cobra King was hit by a Panzerfaust round that penetrated its armor and started a fire in bow machine gun ammunition storage, the tank was abandoned on 27 March 1945. No crewmen were killed.

== After the war ==
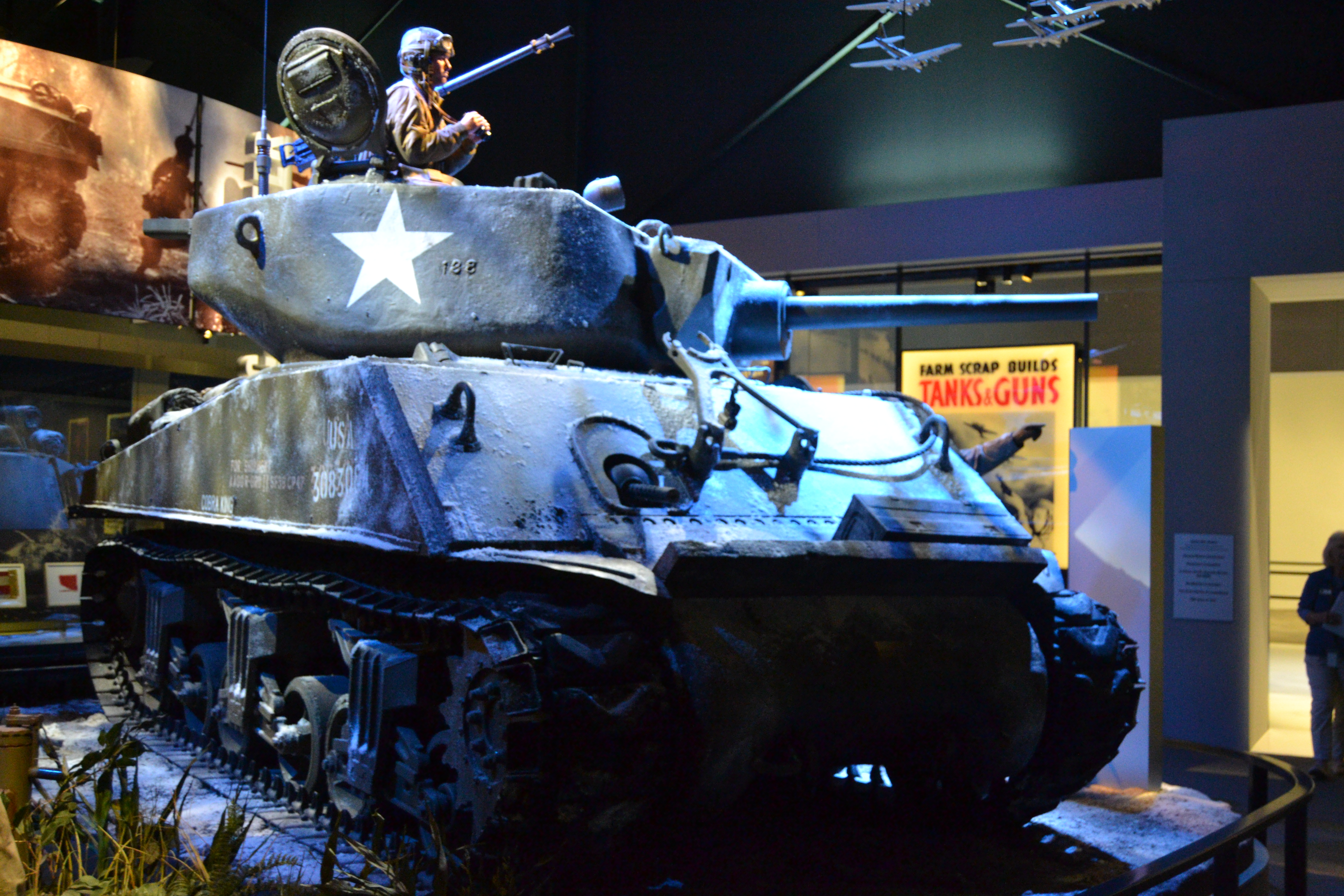
Cobra King's display at the National Museum of the United States Army

After the war, the shell-pitted and gutted Cobra King was recovered from the battlefield and displayed as a symbolic "gate guard" at McKee Barracks in Crailsheim, Germany (1957-1967); at Ferris Barracks in Erlangen, Germany 1967-1993; and, later, Rose Barracks in Vilseck, Germany (1993-2008).

As Army historians slowly investigated the backstories of old WWII tanks remaining in Europe, Army chaplain Keith Goode began to suspect that the anonymous tank rusting at Rose Barracks was Cobra King. In 2008, Army historians concluded that it indeed was. Cobra King had been built at the Fisher Tank Arsenal at Flint, Michigan. Only 254 Jumbos were built; each was given a serial number, and the Army registration numbers assigned to the vehicles were also in sequential order. This allowed Army historians to confirm a direct match with the two sets of numbers, and identify Cobra King.

In July 2009, the United States Army Center of Military History shipped Cobra King from Germany to the Patton Museum at Fort Knox for restoration. Restoration work included the difficult task of finding parts from original sources, such as an original Ford V-8 engine, 75mm gun, and tracks identical to Cobra King's originals. The exterior was restored, but no attempt was made to render the tank driveable and only minimally clean and restore the fire damaged interior (dozens of cartridge cases and spent bullets that were cooked off in the fire were found under the turret basket).

On 3 August 2017, Cobra King was installed at the new National Museum of the United States Army at Fort Belvoir, twenty miles south of Washington, D. C.

== Bibliography ==
- Baron, Richard (2000). Raid!: The Untold Story of Patton's Secret Mission. Dell. ISBN 978-0440236092.
- Berndt, Thomas (1993). Standard Catalog of U.S. Military Vehicles 1940-1965. Motorbooks International. ISBN 978-0873412230.
- Conners, Chris (2020). Medium Tank M4A1 Sherman.
- Domes, Peter; Heinlein, Martin. "Task Force Baum: Behind Enemy Lines". Task Force Baum and the Hammelburg Raid.
- Fox, Don M. (2003). Patton's Vanguard: The United States Army 4th Armored Division. McFarland. ISBN 978-0786415823.
- Fox, Don M. (2020). Final Battles of Patton's Vanguard: The United States Army Fourth Armored Division, 1945-1946. McFarland, Incorporated, Publishers. ISBN 978-1476638997.
- George, James (November 2014). "Cobra King: Where Is She Today?". America in WWII.
- Marshall, S. L. A. (1946). Bastogne: The First Eight Days. Washington, D. C.: Infantry Journal. ISBN 978-1505566055.
- Melancon, Dave (25 February 2009). "'Cobra King' led 4th Armored Division column that relieved Bastogne during Battle of the Bulge". Army.mil. United States Army.
- Pizza Guy (8 December 2005). "RB man led secret World War II raid". Poway News-Chieftain / Rancho Bernado News-Journal. San Diego Union-Tribune.
- Redmon, Garry. "Cobra King". Armor For The Ages.
- Ruane, Michael E. (3 August 2017). "A Battered World War II Hero of Bastogne Gets a New Home and A Museum Built Around It". Washington Post.
- Svan, Jennifer H. (27 December 2008). "Vilseck tank confirmed as 'Cobra King'". Stars And Stripes. United States Army.
- "Artifact Of The Month: M4E3A2 Sherman Tank 'Cobra King'". National Museum of the United States Army. Archived from the original on 4 July 2020.
- "Genera Motors' $1 Million Gift Sponsors Historic Macro Artifact" (PDF). Armyhistory.org. Army Historical Foundation.
