= Bruce Palmer Jr. =

United States Army general (1913–2000)

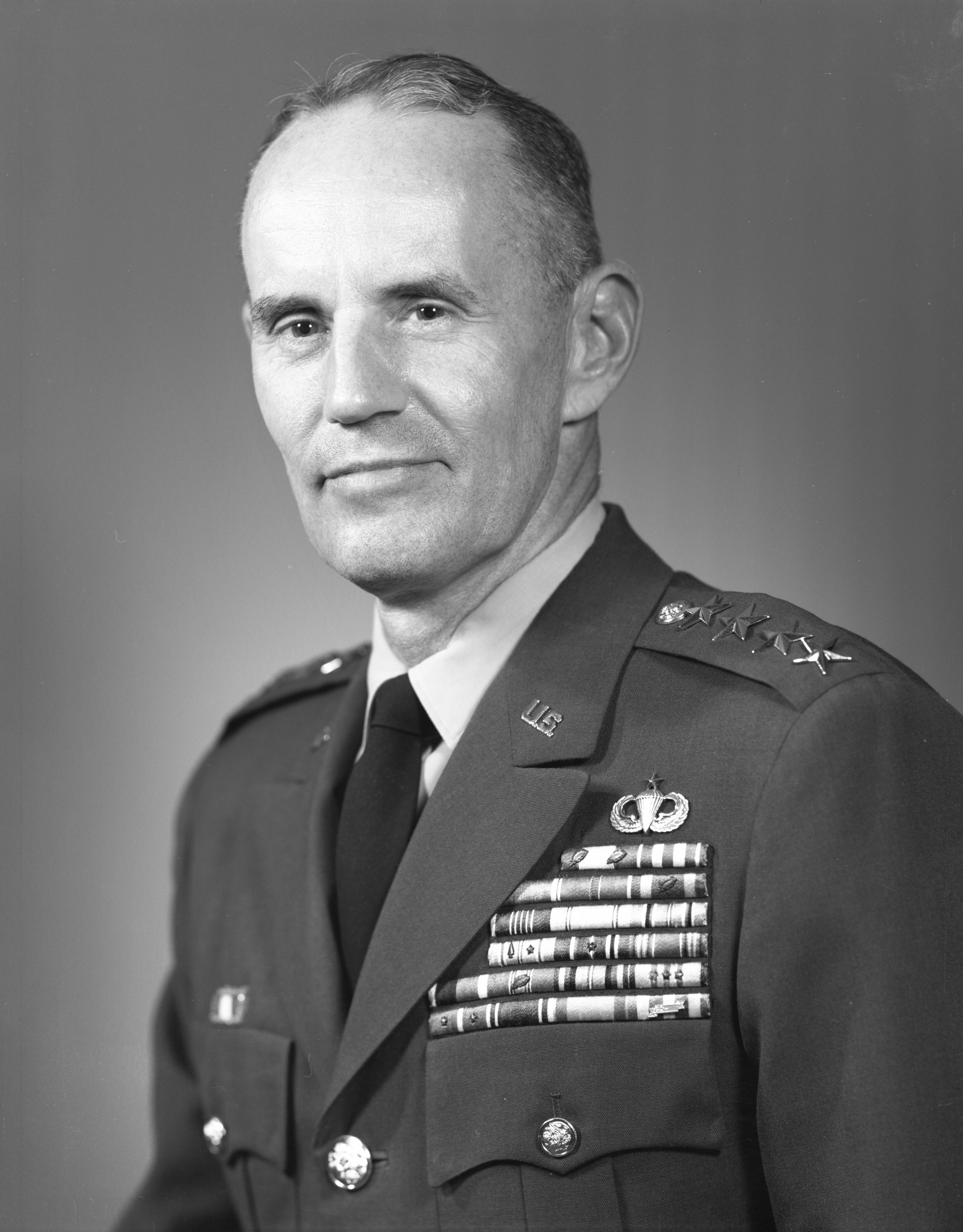
- Palmer in 1968
- Born: 13 April 1913; Austin, Texas, U.S.
- Died: 10 October 2000 (aged 87); Fairfax, Virginia, U.S.
- Burial place: Arlington National Cemetery, Arrington County, Virginia, U.S.
- Relatives: George Henry Palmer (grandfather)
- Military career
- Allegiance: United States
- Branch: United States Army
- Service years: 1936–1974
- Rank: General
- Commands: United States Readiness Command; Chief of Staff of the United States Army; II Field Force, Vietnam; XVIII Airborne Corps; 16th Infantry Regiment; 63rd Infantry Regiment
- Conflicts: World War II; Operation Power Pack; Vietnam War
- Awards: Army Distinguished Service Medal (5); Air Force Distinguished Service Medal; Silver Star; Legion of Merit; Bronze Star Medal; Air Medal (2)
- Other work: Author

Bruce Palmer Jr. (13 April 1913 – 10 October 2000) was a general in the United States Army. He commanded the XVIII Airborne Corps during Operation Power Pack, the II Field Force, Vietnam during the Vietnam War, and was acting Chief of Staff of the United States Army from July to October 1972.

== Early life ==
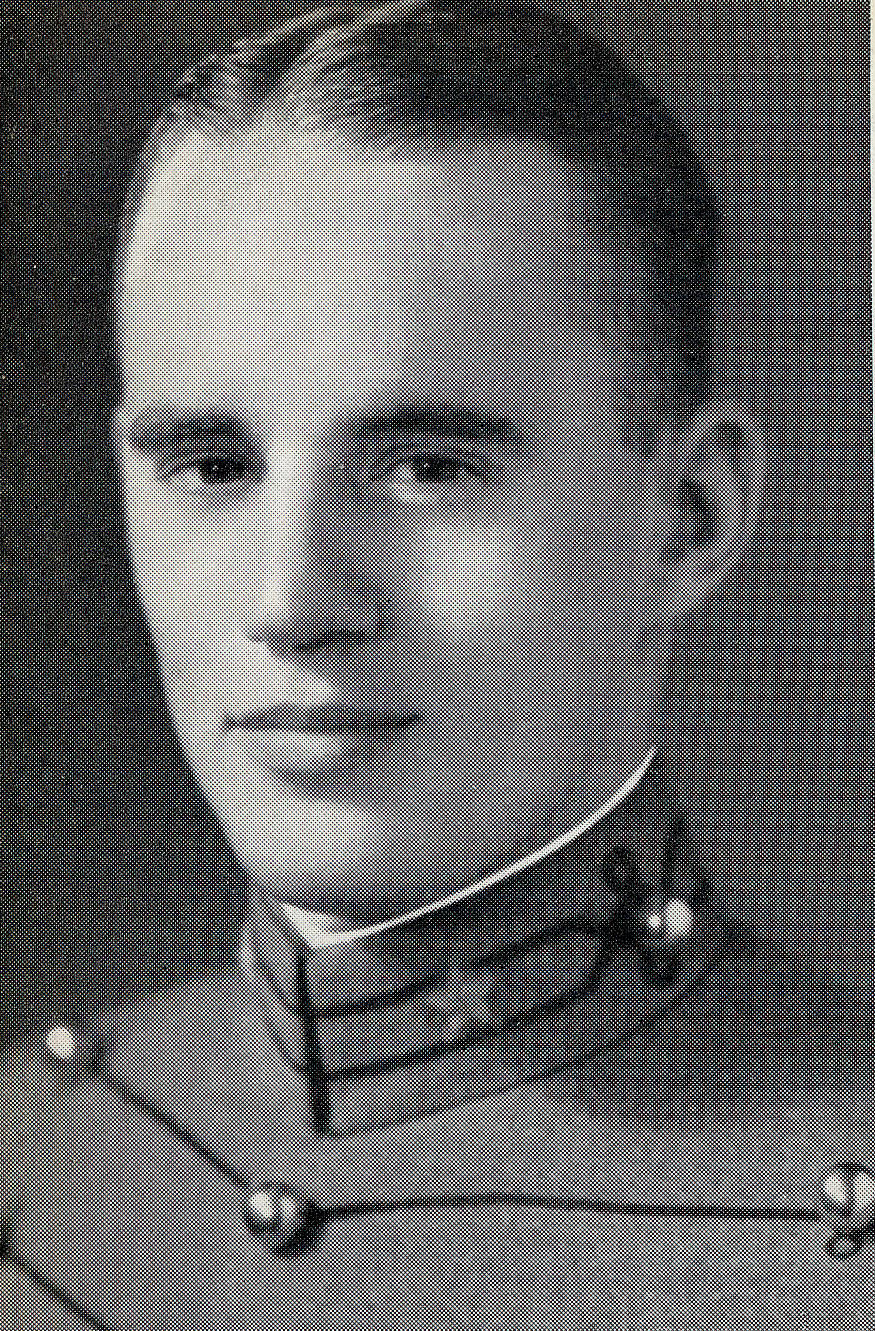
Palmer as a West Point cadet c. 1936

Palmer was born in Austin, Texas, on 13 April 1913. His father Bruce Palmer, Sr. was an Army Brigadier General, and his paternal grandfather George Henry Palmer received the Medal of Honor during the American Civil War.

== Military career ==
Palmer graduated from the United States Military Academy in 1936, was commissioned a second lieutenant and served with the 8th Cavalry at Fort Bliss, Texas, 1936–1939. Palmer was promoted to first lieutenant in June 1939, and served as regimental adjutant from June to September 1939.

Palmer graduated from the Cavalry School at Fort Riley, Kansas in 1940; was a troop and squadron commander of the 6th Cavalry (Mechanized), 1940–1942; and was promoted to temporary ranks of captain, October 1940, and major, February 1942.

Palmer served in the Operations Division of the War Department General Staff, 1942–1943; was promoted to temporary lieutenant colonel, February 1943; and was chief of staff of the 6th Infantry Division in Southwest Pacific operations in World War II, 1944–1945.

Palmer was promoted to temporary colonel, January 1945, and permanent captain, June 1946, and major, July 1948; commanded the 63rd Infantry Regiment in the Korean occupation, 1945–1946; was chief of plans and operations of the First United States Army, 1947–1949; was instructor of tactics and then director of instruction at the Infantry School, Fort Benning, 1949–1951; concurrently completed the basic airborne course; and graduated from the Army War College, 1952.

Palmer was secretary of the general staff and chief of the Plans Division, United States Army Europe, 1952–1954; was promoted to permanent lieutenant colonel, July 1953; was commander of the 16th Infantry Regiment, 1954–1955; served on the faculty of the Army War College, 1955–1957; and was deputy secretary of the General Staff and White House liaison officer, Office of the Chief of Staff, 1957–1959.

Palmer was promoted to temporary brigadier general, August 1959; was deputy commandant of the Army War College, 1959–1961; and was assistant commander of the 82nd Airborne Division at Fort Bragg, 1961–1962. He was promoted to permanent colonel, June 1961, and temporary major general, May 1962; was chief of staff of the Eighth United States Army, Korea, 1962–1963; was assistant deputy chief of staff for plans and operations, 1963–1964, and deputy chief of staff for military operations, 1964–1965; was promoted to permanent brigadier general, February 1963, and temporary lieutenant general, July 1964.

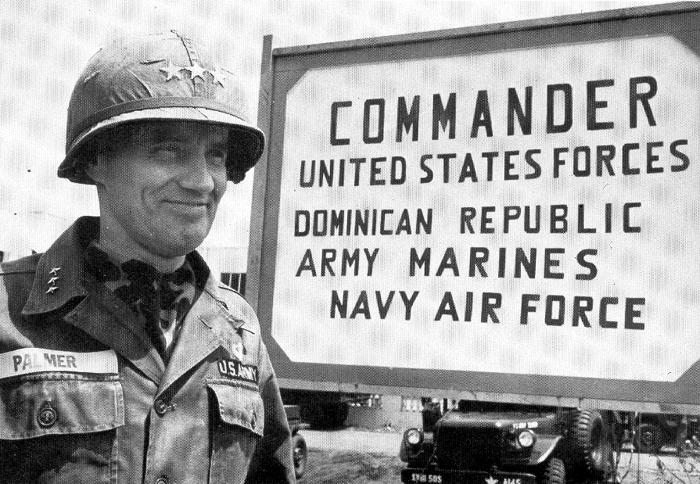
LTG Bruce R. Palmer Jr. in Santo Domingo during Operation Power Pack, 1965.

Palmer was commander of the XVIII Airborne Corps, 1965–1967, and concurrently commander of Task Force 120 and United States Land Forces, during Operation Power Pack, the US intervention in the Dominican Republic, May 1965, and commander of United States Forces and Army Forces and deputy commander of the Inter-American Peace Force in operations in the Dominican Republic, May 1965 – January 1966.

Palmer was commander of the II Field Force, Vietnam, and deputy commander of the United States Army Vietnam, 1967–1968; was promoted to temporary general, August 1968, and served as Vice Chief of Staff of the United States Army, 1 August 1968 – 30 June 1972; was acting Chief of Staff of the United States Army, 1 July – 11 October 1972; provided managerial continuity at the top of the army during the Westmoreland-Abrams interregnum, supervised the continuing drawdown of army forces from Vietnam and related army-wide readjustments, and prepared major revisions in army organizational structure; resumed duties as Vice Chief of Staff; was commander in chief of the United States Readiness Command, 1973–1974; and retired from the army, September 1974, coincidentally on the day his close associate General Creighton W. Abrams died. Military historian Lewis Sorley professed in his biography of General Westmoreland that Palmer was really the Chief of Staff performing most of the duties of office while Westmoreland was making speeches about Vietnam.

== Personal data ==
Palmer married Kay Sibert in 1936. She died in 1996. They had a son, Bruce III, and two daughters, Maureen and Robin. Palmer died on 10 October 2000. He is buried at Arlington National Cemetery near his father, Bruce Palmer Sr.

Palmer wrote two books in his retirement, The 25 Year War: America's Military Role in Vietnam and Intervention in the Caribbean: The Dominican Crisis of 1965.

== Awards and decorations ==
During his military career, Palmer was awarded five Army Distinguished Service Medals, an Air Force Distinguished Service Medal, a Silver Star, Legion of Merit, Bronze Star Medal, two Air Medals and the National Intelligence Distinguished Service Medal.

Military offices
Preceded by Ralph E. Haines Jr.	Vice Chief of Staff of the United States Army; 1968–1973	Succeeded by Alexander Haig
Preceded by William C. Westmoreland	Chief of Staff of the United States Army (acting); July–October 1972	Succeeded by Creighton Abrams
