= Creighton Abrams =

United States Army general (1914–1974)

Creighton Abrams Jr.
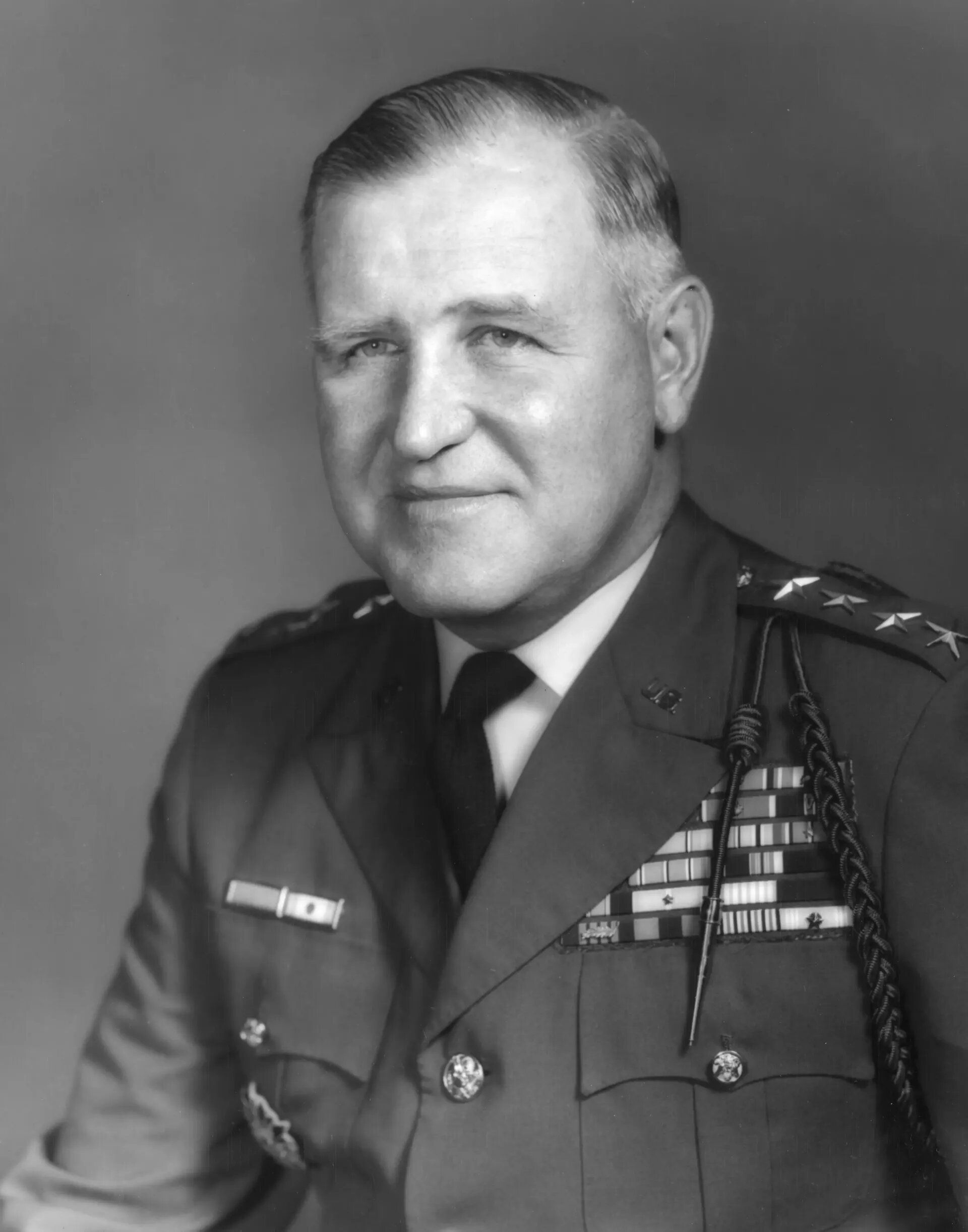
- Abrams, c. 1971
- Born: 15 September 1914; Springfield, Massachusetts, U.S.
- Died: 4 September 1974 (aged 59); Washington, D.C., U.S.
- Burial place: Arlington National Cemetery
- Relatives: Brigadier General Creighton W. Abrams III (son); General John N. Abrams (son); General Robert B. Abrams (son)
- Military career
- Allegiance: United States
- Branch: United States Army
- Service years: 1936–1974
- Rank: General
- Commands: Chief of Staff of the United States Army; Military Assistance Command, Vietnam; V Corps; 3rd Armored Division; 2nd Armored Cavalry Regiment; 63rd Armor Regiment; Combat Command B, 4th Armored Division; 37th Tank Battalion
- Conflicts: World War II; Korean War; Vietnam War
- Awards: Distinguished Service Cross (2); Defense Distinguished Service Medal (2); Army Distinguished Service Medal (5); Air Force Distinguished Service Medal; Silver Star (2); Legion of Merit (2); Bronze Star Medal; Joint Service Commendation Medal

Creighton Williams Abrams Jr. (15 September 1914 – 4 September 1974) was a United States Army general who commanded military operations in the Vietnam War from 1968 to 1972. He was then Chief of Staff of the United States Army from 1972 until his death in 1974.

In 1980, the United States Army named its then new main battle tank, the M1 Abrams, after him. The IG Farben building in West Germany was also named after Abrams from 1975 to 1995.

== Military career ==
=== Early career ===
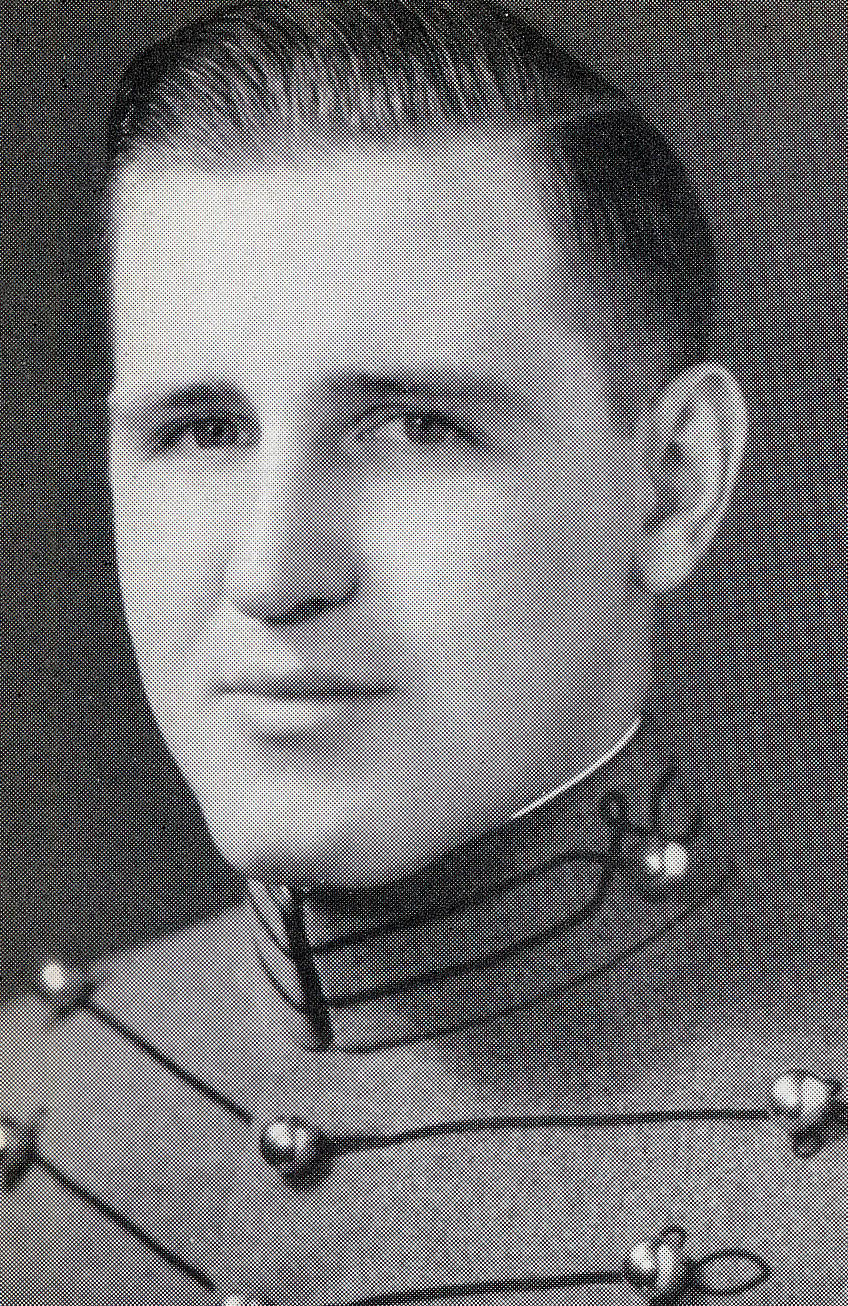
Abrams as a West Point cadet c. 1936

Abrams graduated from the United States Military Academy at West Point in the Class of 1936, ranking 185th of 276 in the class. His classmates included Benjamin O. Davis Jr. and William Westmoreland. He served with the 1st Cavalry Division from 1936 to 1940, being promoted to first lieutenant in 1939 and temporary captain in 1940.

Abrams became an armor officer early in the development of that branch and served as a tank company commander in the 1st Armored Division in 1940.

=== World War II ===
During World War II, Abrams served in the 4th Armored Division, initially as regimental adjutant (June 1941 – June 1942), battalion commander (July 1942 – March 1943), and regiment executive officer (March–September 1943) with the 37th Armor Regiment. In September 1943, a reorganization of the division redesignated the 37th Armor Regiment to the 37th Tank Battalion, which Abrams commanded. He commanded Combat Command B of the division during the Battle of the Bulge, and entitled to wear the French Fourragère as a member of the 4th Armored Division.

During this time Abrams was promoted to the temporary ranks of major (February 1942), lieutenant colonel (September 1942), and colonel (April 1945). Abrams was promoted to lieutenant colonel at age 27 years, 11 months.

During much of this time, the 4th Armored Division, led by the 37th Tank Battalion, was the spearhead for General George S. Patton's Third Army. Abrams was well known as an aggressive armor commander. By using his qualities as a leader and by consistently exploiting the relatively small advantages of speed and reliability of his vehicles, he managed to defeat German forces that had the advantage of superior armor and superior guns. He was twice decorated with the Distinguished Service Cross for extraordinary heroism, on 20 September and 26 December 1944. General George Patton said of him: "I'm supposed to be the best tank commander in the Army, but I have one peer—Abe Abrams. He's the world champion."

Frequently the spearhead of the Third Army during World War II, Abrams was one of the leaders in the relief effort that broke up the German entrenchments surrounding Bastogne and the 101st Airborne Division during the Battle of the Bulge. In April 1945, he was promoted to temporary colonel but reverted to lieutenant colonel during the post-war demobilization. On April 23, 1945, Will Lang Jr. wrote a biography of Abrams called "Colonel Abe" for Life.

=== Interbellum and Korean War ===
Following the war, Abrams served on the Army General Staff (1945–1946), as head of the department of tactics at the Armored School, Fort Knox (1946–1948), and graduated from the Command and General Staff College at Fort Leavenworth (1949).

Abrams commanded the 63rd Tank Battalion, part of the 1st Infantry Division, in Europe (1949–1951). He was again promoted to colonel and commanded the 2nd Armored Cavalry Regiment (1951–1952). These units were important assignments due to the Cold War concern for potential invasion of western Europe by the Soviet Union. He then attended and graduated from the Army War College in 1953.

Because of Abrams's service in Europe and his War College tour, he joined the Korean War late. In South Korea (1953–1954), he successively served as chief of staff of the I, IX, and X Corps.

=== Staff assignments and division command ===
Upon Abrams' return from South Korea, he served as Chief of Staff of the Armor Center, Fort Knox (1954–1956). He was promoted to brigadier general and appointed deputy chief of staff for reserve components at the Pentagon (1956–1959). He was assistant division commander of 3rd Armored Division (1959–1960) and then commanded the division (1960–1962) upon his promotion to major general. He was transferred to the Pentagon as deputy Chief of Staff for Operations (1962–1963) and during this time he served as representative of the Army Chief of Staff overseeing the armed forces deployed to support the enrollment of James Meredith at the segregated University of Mississippi.

He performed a similar role in May 1963 during the civil rights protests in Birmingham, Alabama. Following these roles Abrams demanded a more coherent policy for the swift employment of Federal forces domestically. In May 1963, the Joint Chiefs formalized those arrangements with the Strike Command instructed to be prepared "to move ready, deployable, tailored Army forces ranging in size from a reinforced company to a maximum force of 15,000 personnel".

He was promoted to lieutenant general and commanded V Corps in Europe (1963–1964).

Abrams was on the cover of Time magazine three times in ten years: 1961 (13 October), 1968 (19 April), and 1971 (15 February).

=== Vietnam War ===
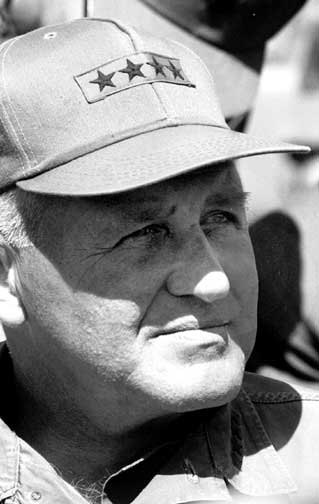
Abrams watches Bob Hope at Long Binh in South Vietnam, December 1968

Abrams was promoted to general in 1964 and appointed Vice Chief of Staff of the United States Army. He was seriously considered as a candidate for chief of staff. Due to concerns about the conduct of the Vietnam War, he was appointed as deputy to his West Point classmate, General William Westmoreland, commander of the Military Assistance Command, Vietnam (MACV), in May 1967.

Abrams succeeded Westmoreland as COMUSMACV on 10 June 1968. His tenure of command was not marked by the public optimism of his predecessors, who were prone to press conferences and public statements.

Lewis Sorley asserted that in contrast to Westmoreland, Abrams implemented counterinsurgency tactics that focused on winning the hearts and minds of the Vietnamese rural population. A joint military-civilian organization named Civil Operations and Rural Development Support under CIA official William Colby carried out the hearts and minds programs. According to a colonel cited in Men's Journal, there was more continuity than change in Vietnam after Abrams succeeded Westmoreland. (Note: 'That claim touches a nerve when put to Gian Gentile. "We don't know how Iraq is going to turn out", he snaps. With that, the colonel returns to his binders. They hold reams of cable communiqués from Vietnam war commander General William Westmoreland and his successor, General Creighton Abrams. Westmoreland embodied the traditional approach: a hard-charging, hammer-swinging leader who used search-and-destroy tactics that focused on the enemy. Abrams favored counterinsurgency methods, and focused on winning the hearts and minds of the population. Gentile has stated "People think we were losing in Vietnam, and oh, a better general with better tactics came in and saved the day," he says, waving his arms for emphasis. "Nonsense." That's what led Gentile to dig through antique war correspondence from two dead generals. "There was more continuity than change in Vietnam after Abrams arrived," he says — people have it backward. And in a way he's right: Westmoreland once declared that the jungles of Vietnam were "no place for either tank or mechanized infantry units." And Abrams — well, the Army named a tank after the guy." Abrams, Gentile feels, showed up just in time to snatch the scraps of glory.'- quoted from Matthew Teague in Men's Journal)

Newsweek magazine at the time of Abrams' appointment observed that its sources within the Lyndon Johnson administration had spoken at length with Abrams in the past, and had come away convinced that the general would make few changes. The magazine quoted an unidentified military analyst to the effect that, "All this talk of dropping search-and destroy operations in favor of clear-and-hold is just a lot of bull." None of the strategy papers produced by Abrams on assuming command of MACV indicated the need for any change in U.S. strategy and U.S. forces continued large-scale operations to engage People's Army of Vietnam (PAVN) main force units including the Battle of Hamburger Hill in May 1969.

From 1969, the Vietnam War increasingly became a conventional war between the military forces of South Vietnam and North Vietnam. Following the election of President Richard Nixon, Abrams began implementing the Nixon Administration's Vietnamization policy to decrease U.S. involvement in Vietnam. With this new goal, Abrams decreased American troop strength from a peak of 543,000 in early 1969 to 49,000 in June 1972.

The South Vietnamese forces with aerial support from the U.S. repelled the PAVN conventional Easter Offensive in 1972. The prolonged efforts and expense of the war had by then exhausted much of the American public and political support. Abrams disdained most of the politicians with whom he was forced to deal, in particular Robert McNamara and McGeorge Bundy, and had an even lower opinion of defense contractors, whom he accused of war profiteering.

Abrams was in charge of the Cambodian Incursion in 1970. President Nixon seemed to hold Abrams in high regard, and often relied on his advice. In a tape-recorded conversation between Nixon and National Security Advisor Henry Kissinger on December 9, 1970, Nixon told Kissinger about Abrams' thoughts on intervention in Cambodia that: "If Abrams strongly recommends it we will do it." Troop levels in Vietnam eventually reached 25,000 in January 1973, at the time of the four power Paris Peace Accords. Although it occurred before he assumed total command, Abrams bore the brunt of fallout from the My Lai massacre in March 1968.

Nixon grew increasingly dissatisfied with Abrams' performance during Operation Lam Son 719 and had debated for some time whether to recall Abrams. On 4 May 1972, a little more than a month after the onset of the Easter Offensive, Nixon resolved to replace Abrams with his former deputy General Frederick Weyand, but the decision was not publicly announced until 20 June 1972.

=== Chief of Staff ===
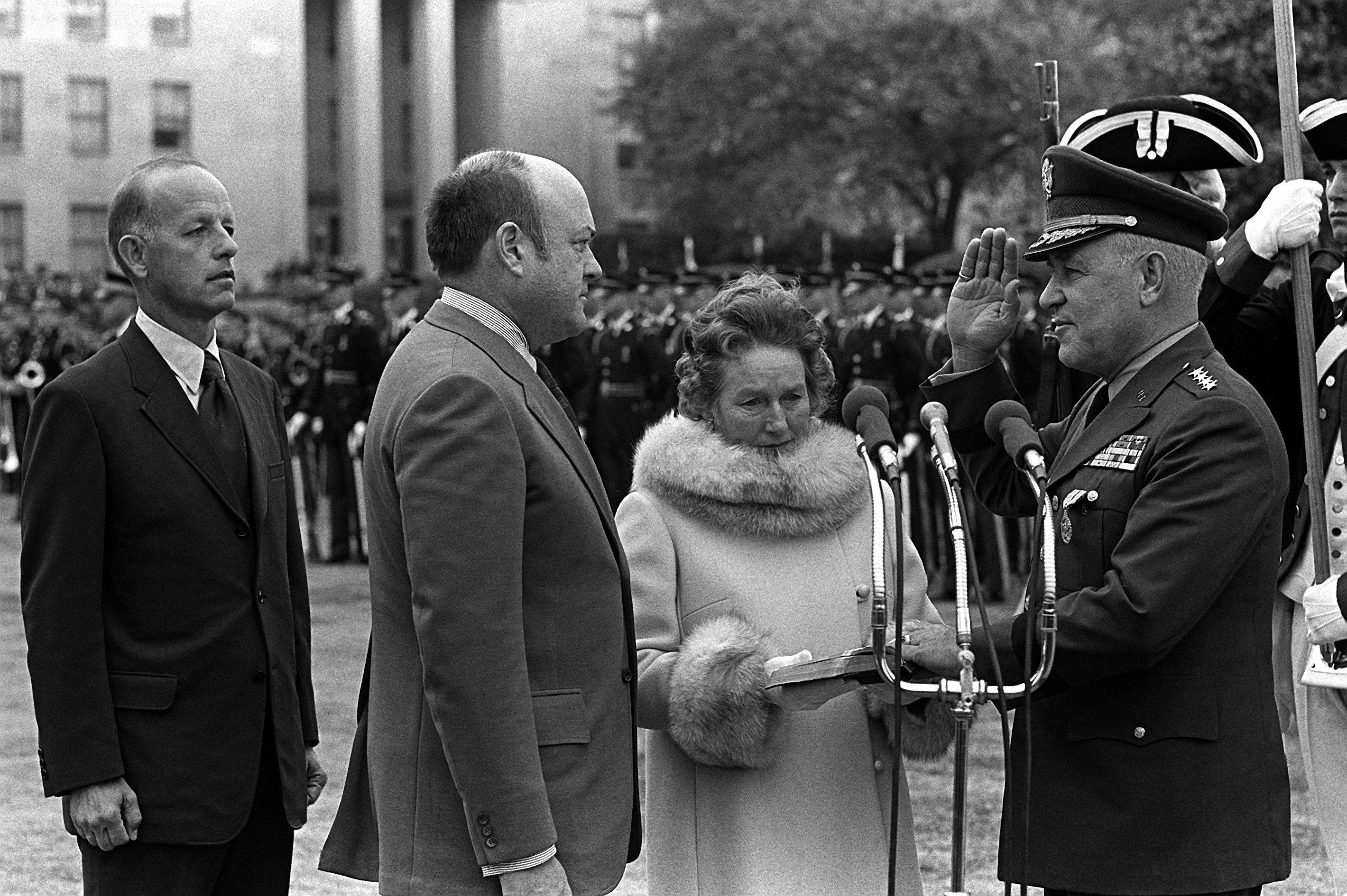
Abrams is sworn in as Army Chief of Staff, 16 October 1972

Abrams was appointed Chief of Staff of the United States Army by Nixon in June 1972. He was not confirmed by the United States Senate until October, due to political repercussions involving accusations of unauthorized bombings of North Vietnam. It has also been reported that Congress had delayed the confirmation to question the administration's war in Cambodia. During this time, Abrams began the transition to the all-volunteer army, also known as Project VOLAR.

In January 1974, Abrams directed the formation of a Ranger battalion. The 1st Battalion (Ranger), 75th Infantry, was activated and parachuted into Fort Stewart, Georgia, on 1 July; the 2nd Battalion (Ranger), 75th Infantry followed with activation on 1 October. The 3rd Battalion, 75th Infantry (Ranger), and Headquarters and Headquarters Company, 75th Infantry (Ranger), received their colors a decade later on 3 October 1984, at Fort Benning, Georgia. The 75th Ranger Regiment was designated in February 1986. The modern Ranger battalions owe their existence to Abrams and his charter:

The battalion is to be an elite, light, and the most proficient infantry in the world. A battalion that can do things with its hands and weapons better than anyone. The battalion will contain no 'hoodlums or brigands' and if the battalion is formed from such persons, it will be disbanded. Wherever the battalion goes, it must be apparent that it is the best.

Abrams served as Chief of Staff until his death on 4 September 1974.

== Personal life ==
Born in Springfield, Massachusetts, and raised in the Feeding Hills section of Agawam, he was the son of Nellie Louise (Randall) and Creighton Williams Abrams, a railroad worker. Abrams married Julia Berthe Harvey (1915–2003) in 1936. She founded the army group of Arlington Ladies and devoted time to humanitarian causes.

The Abramses had three sons and three daughters. All three sons became Army general officers, including John N. Abrams and Robert B. Abrams.

Abrams converted to Catholicism during his time in Vietnam. He was raised as Methodist Protestant.

A heavy cigar smoker, Abrams died at age 59, eleven days before his 60th birthday at Walter Reed Army Medical Center in Washington, D.C., from complications of surgery to remove a cancerous lung. He is buried with his wife Julia in Arlington National Cemetery.

== Awards and decorations ==
His awards and decorations include:

Distinguished Service Cross with bronze oak leaf cluster
Defense Distinguished Service Medal with bronze oak leaf cluster
Army Distinguished Service Medal with four bronze oak leaf clusters
Air Force Distinguished Service Medal
Silver Star with bronze oak leaf cluster
Legion of Merit with bronze oak leaf cluster
Bronze Star Medal with V device
Joint Service Commendation Medal
American Defense Service Medal
American Campaign Medal
European–African–Middle Eastern Campaign Medal with silver campaign star
Asiatic-Pacific Campaign Medal
World War II Victory Medal
Army of Occupation Medal
National Defense Service Medal with one bronze oak leaf cluster
Korean Service Medal with bronze campaign star
Vietnam Service Medal with two silver and three bronze campaign stars
Vietnam Service Medal with bronze campaign star (second ribbon required for accoutrement spacing)
Army Presidential Unit Citation

Foreign decorations and awards

His foreign awards and decorations include:

Order of the Patriotic War Second Class (Soviet Union)
Czechoslovak War Cross 1939–1945 (Czechoslovakia)
Legion of Honour (Commander) (Note: French: Légion d'honneur - Commandeur) (France)
Legion of Honour (Knight) (Note: French: Légion d'honneur - Chevalier) (France)
Croix de guerre 1939–1945 (Palme en bronze - Bronze palm) (France)
Order of the Rising Sun, Grand Cordon (Japan)
Order of Sikatuna, rank of Lakan (Commander) (Philippines)
Philippine Liberation Medal (Philippines)
Order of Military Merit (무공훈장) (2nd Class - Eulji Cordon (을지)) (Note: Sometimes spelt Ulchi) (ROK) with Gold Star
Order of Military Merit (무공훈장) (1st Class - Taegeuk Cordon (태극)) (Note: Sometimes spelt Taeguk) (ROK)
Order of National Security Merit, Tongil Medal (South Korea)
Order of National Security Merit, Gukseon Medal (South Korea)
Republic of Korea Presidential Unit Citation (South Korea)
Korean War Service Medal (ROK)
National Order of Vietnam, Knight Grand Cross (South Vietnam)
Army Distinguished Service Order, First Class (South Vietnam)
Air Force Distinguished Service Order, First Class (South Vietnam)
Navy Distinguished Service Order, First Class (South Vietnam)
Gallantry Cross with Palm (South Vietnam)
Armed Forces Honor Medal, First Class (South Vietnam)
Civil Actions Medal, First Class (South Vietnam)
Vietnam Campaign Medal (Note: Vietnamese: Chiến Dịch Bội Tinh - Republic of Vietnam Campaign Medal) (South Vietnam)
the Most Exalted Order of the White Elephant, Knight Grand Cross (Thailand)
The Most Noble Order of the Crown of Thailand, Knight Grand Cross (Thailand)
Companion of the Distinguished Service Order (DSO) (United Kingdom)
United Nations Service Medal (Korea) (United Nations)

Other awards

French Fourragère

Other badges

Army Staff Identification Badge

== Dates of rank ==
Insignia	Rank	Component	Date
	Cadet	Hillsborough High School	July 1, 1932
	Second lieutenant	Regular Army	June 12, 1936
	First lieutenant	Regular Army	June 12, 1939
	Captain	Army of the United States	September 9, 1940
	Major	Army of the United States	February 1, 1942
	Lieutenant colonel	Army of the United States	September 3, 1942
	Colonel	Army of the United States	April 21, 1945
	Lieutenant colonel	Army of the United States	June 1, 1946
	Captain	Regular Army	June 12, 1946
	Major	Regular Army	July 1, 1948
	Colonel	Army of the United States	June 29, 1951
	Lieutenant colonel	Regular Army	July 7, 1953
	Brigadier general	Army of the United States	February 7, 1956
	Major general	Army of the United States	November 28, 1960
	Colonel	Regular Army	June 12, 1961
	Brigadier general	Regular Army	July 19, 1962
	Major general	Regular Army	May 23, 1963
	Lieutenant general	Army of the United States	August 1, 1963
	General	Army of the United States	September 4, 1964

== Citations ==
Military offices
Preceded by Barksdale Hamlett	Vice Chief of Staff of the United States Army; 1964–1967	Succeeded by Ralph E. Haines Jr.
Preceded by William Westmoreland	Commander, Military Assistance Command, Vietnam; 1968–1972	Succeeded by Frederick C. Weyand
Preceded by Bruce Palmer Jr.	Chief of Staff of the United States Army; 1972–1974	Succeeded by Frederick C. Weyand
