= Ralph E. Haines Jr. =

United States Army general (1913–2011)

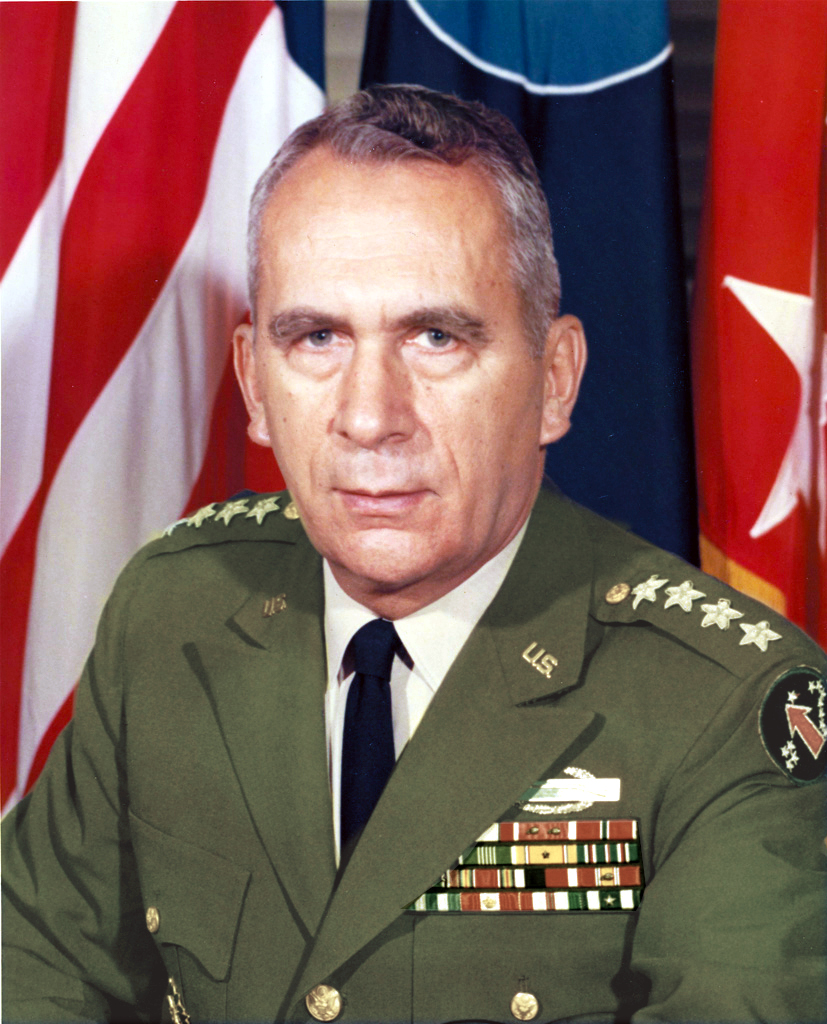
- Haines as Commander, United States Army, Pacific
- Born: 21 August 1913; Fort Mott, New Jersey, U.S.
- Died: 23 November 2011 (aged 98); San Antonio, Texas, U.S.
- Burial place: Fort Sam Houston National Cemetery
- Military career
- Allegiance: United States
- Branch: United States Army
- Service years: 1935–1973
- Rank: General
- Commands: Continental Army Command; United States Army, Pacific; III Corps; 1st Armored Division
- Conflicts: World War II
- Awards: Army Distinguished Service Medal; Legion of Merit (3); Bronze Star Medal

Ralph Edward Haines Jr. (21 August 1913 – 23 November 2011) was a United States Army four-star general who served as Vice Chief of Staff of the United States Army from 1967 to 1968, Commander, United States Army, Pacific from August 1968 to October 1970, and Commanding General, United States Continental Army Command from 1970 to 1973. At his death he was the army's oldest living four-star general and its senior retired officer.

== Military career ==
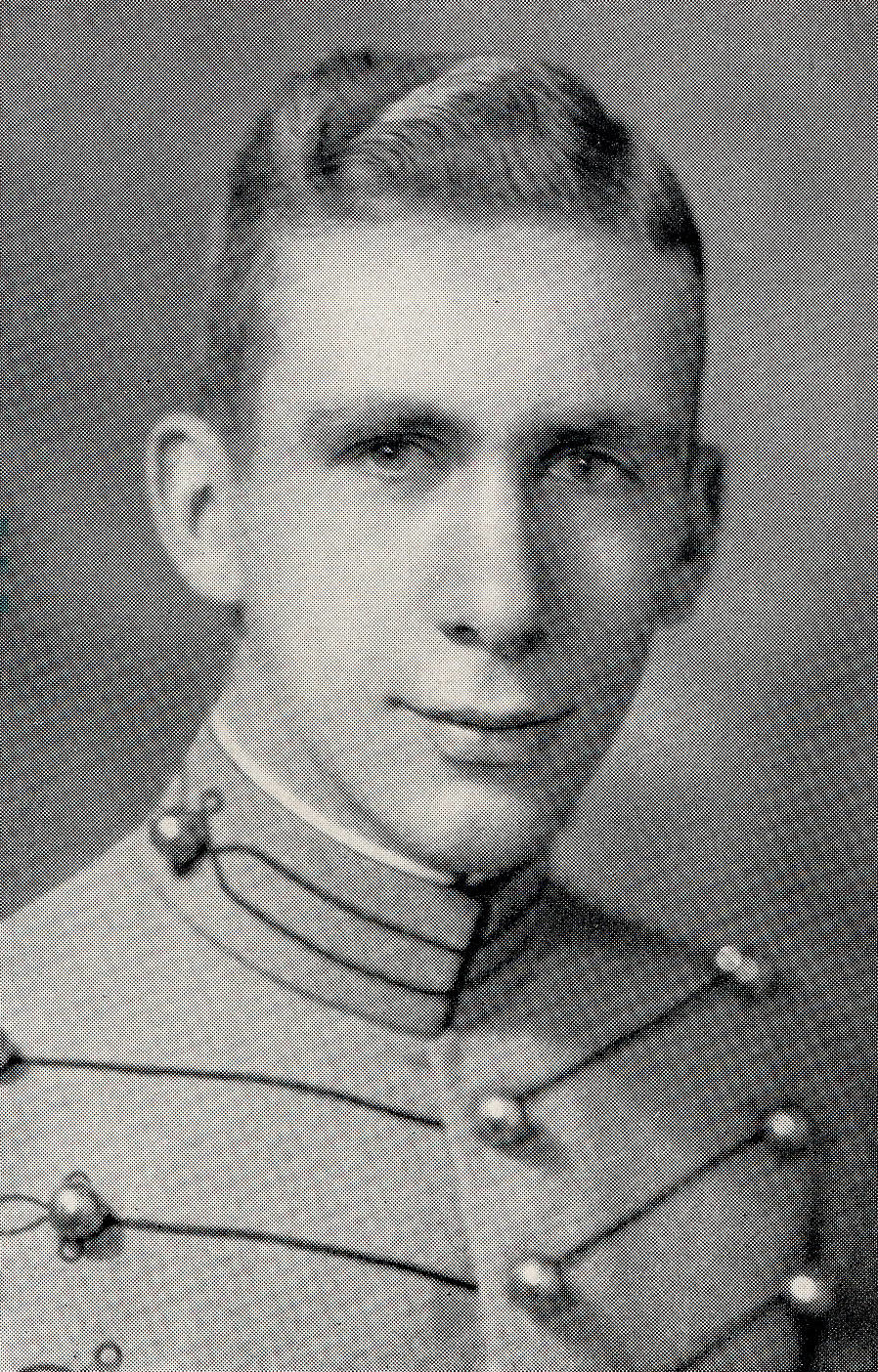
Haines as a West Point cadet in 1935

Haines attended Texas Military Institute and graduated in 1930 as his class valedictorian. He graduated from the United States Military Academy in 1935 with a commission in the Cavalry. He later attended the Armed Forces Staff College, the Army War College, the National War College and the Army Management School. Prior to World War II he served in the Philippine Scouts and, during the war, he served in Italy.

Haines served as Commanding General of the 1st Armored Division at Fort Hood, Texas, from 1962 to 1963. He served as Deputy Assistant Chief of Staff for Force Development in Washington from 1963 to 1965. From 1965 to 1967, he commanded the III Corps. He was successively Acting Vice Chief of Staff and then Vice Chief of Staff for the United States Army and during this period he commanded the army forces assisting the suppression of the 1968 Washington, D.C. riots. He then served as Commanding General, Continental Army Command, at Fort Monroe, Virginia, until his retirement on 31 January 1973.

Haines' awards include the Army Distinguished Service Medal, the Legion of Merit, and the Bronze Star Medal.

== Post military career ==
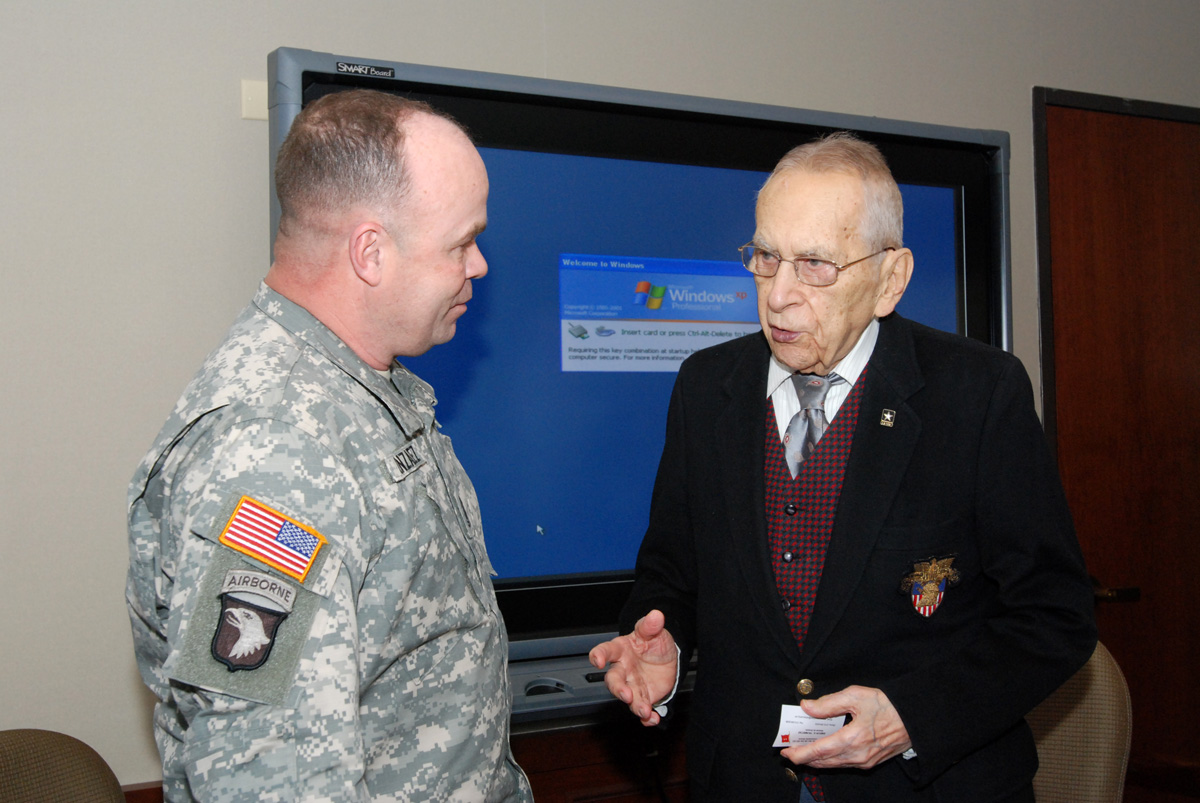
Haines in February 2010

The Ralph E. Haines Jr. Award, presented to the United States Army Reserve Drill Sergeant of the Year, is named in his honor. Haines was member of the Advisory Committee of the U.S. Cavalry Association. He retired to San Antonio, Texas, with his wife, the former Sally Swift, who died in 2003. Haines had two sons, both West Point alumni. One son, Palmer Swift Haines, died in an aircraft crash in 2004 when the Cessna 421 he was piloting suffered dual engine failure near Austin, Texas.

Haines died in November 2011 at the San Antonio Military Medical Center of natural causes.

Military offices
Preceded by Creighton Abrams	Vice Chief of Staff of the United States Army; 1967–1968	Succeeded by Bruce Palmer Jr.
