= The 25 Year War =

- Book cover, first edition
- Author: Bruce Palmer Jr.
- Language: English
- Publisher: The University Press of Kentucky
- Publication date: 1984

The 25 Year War: America's Military Role in Vietnam (ISBN 978-0813190365) is a book by General Bruce Palmer Jr. about the Vietnam War, and was published in 1984.

The book is split into two parts, the first which follows chronologically the events leading to the fall of Saigon in 1975 and mentions Palmer's position in those events. The second part is called 'Assessment' and more broadly calls out what was done right and wrong and also offers an alternate role the US could have played in the conflict:

- The US ground forces should have been concentrated in the North and focused on interdicting the flow of soldiers and supplies down the Ho Chi Minh trail.
- The South Vietnam army would have taken on the Viet Cong in the rest of the country, which without the support from the North could have been defeated or contained.
- Instead of declaring openly that invasion of North Vietnam was out of the question for the purpose of relaxing the Soviet Union and China, the U.S. should have constantly threatened Hanoi with amphibious invasion while never intending to actually carry it out. Also, small scale raids into North Vietnam for one purpose or another would not be ruled out.
- No strategic bombing of the North.

Palmer is critical of covert operations:

War involves fighting by the armed forces in overt operations under rules laid down by the Geneva Convention and acceded to by most civilized nations. To place our uniformed military personnel in any other position is gross breach of trust on the part of their government. War must be perceived as legitimate in the eyes of the people and of the warriors entrusted to do the fighting. For these same reasons I have always firmly opposed employing U.S. military personnel in covert operations which the government can credibly deny.

Although Palmer is at times in agreement with the purpose of the operations carried out in secret, such as incursions into Laos or Cambodia, he disagrees strongly with the deception involved.

Palmer saw Schlesingers's warnings to the military about observing the proper chain of command following the resignation of Nixon as being disrespectful to the integrity of the US military.
