= Nives =

Nives is an Italian given name, originating from Latin nivēs, the accusative plural of nix 'snow'. It is derived from Sancta Maria ad Nives 'Our Lady of the Snows'. It may refer to:

- Nives Celsius (born 1981), Croatian socialite, model, singer, and writer
- Nives Ivanković (born 1967), Croatian actress
- Nives Meroi (born 1961), Italian mountaineer
- Nives Orešnik (born 1991), Slovenian model

== See also ==
- Neves (surname)
