= Coincourt =

- Commune
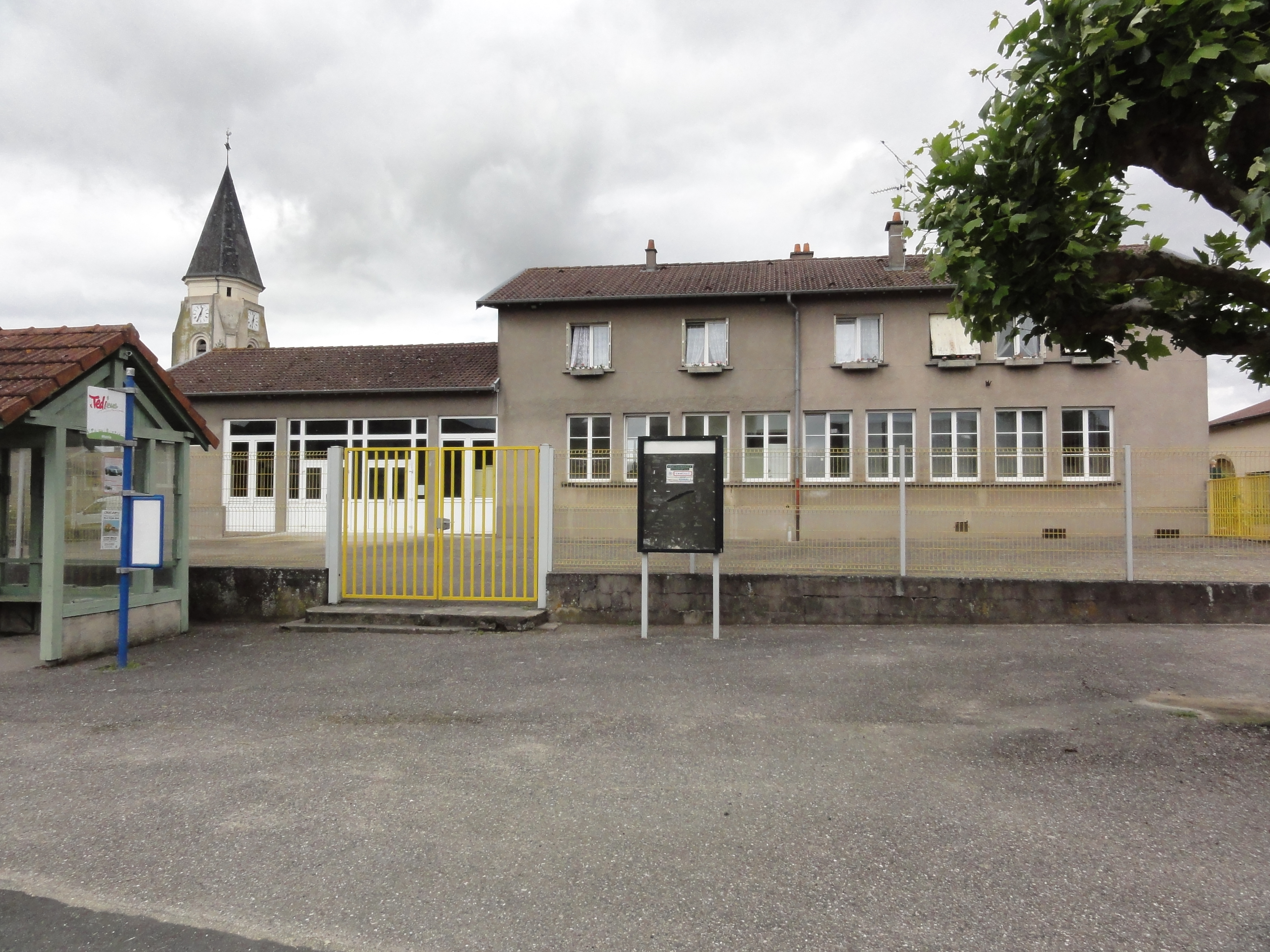
- The town hall and school in Coincourt

- Coat of arms
- Location of Coincourt
- Location within France Location within Grand Est
- Coordinates: 48°42′01″N 6°36′46″E
- Country: France
- Region: Grand Est
- Department: Meurthe-et-Moselle
- Arrondissement: Lunéville
- Canton: Baccarat
- Intercommunality: Pays du Sânon

Government
  - Mayor (2020–2026): Pascal Pierre
- Area^{1}: 7.99 km^{2} (3.08 sq mi)
- Elevation: 250 m (820 ft)
- Highest elevation: 295 m (968 ft)
- Lowest elevation: 228 m (748 ft)
- Population (2023): 129
  - Density: 16.1/km^{2} (41.8/sq mi)
- Time zone: UTC+01:00 (CET)
  - Summer (DST): UTC+02:00 (CEST)
- INSEE/Postal code: 54133 /54370
- ^{1} French Land Register data, which excludes lakes, ponds, glaciers > 1 km^{2} (0.386 sq mi or 247 acres) and river estuaries.

Coincourt (French pronunciation: [kwɛ̃kuʁ]) is a commune in the Meurthe-et-Moselle département in north-eastern France.

== History ==
Before 1870, Coincourt was part of the canton of Vic-sur-Seille. After the Treaty of Frankfurt (1871), it was integrated into the new canton of Arracourt along with eight other communes that remained French. Coincourt was part of Parroy between 1 January 1973 and 1 January 1987.

== See also ==
- Communes of the Meurthe-et-Moselle department
