= Harrison, Winnebago County, Illinois =

Harrison
- Unincorporated community
- Location of Harrison within Illinois Harrison (the United States)
- Coordinates: 42°25′38″N 89°11′29″W
- Country: United States
- State: Illinois
- County: Winnebago
- Township: Harrison
- Elevation: 728 ft (222 m)
- Time zone: UTC-6 (CST)
  - Summer (DST): UTC-5 (CDT)
- Area code: 815

Harrison is an unincorporated community in Winnebago County, Illinois, and is located northwest of Rockford. It is part of the Rockford, Illinois Metropolitan Statistical Area.
