= Lewis Sorley =

American historian (1934–2024)

- Born: August 3, 1934; West Point, New York, U.S.
- Died: September 25, 2024 (aged 90); Carlisle, Pennsylvania, U.S.
- Children: 1

Academic background
- Education: United States Military Academy (BA); University of Pennsylvania (MA); Pennsylvania State University (MS); Johns Hopkins University (PhD)

Academic work
- Discipline: Military history

Lewis Stone "Bob" Sorley III (August 3, 1934 – September 25, 2024) was an American intelligence analyst and military historian. His books about the U.S. war in Vietnam, in which he served as an officer, have been highly influential in government circles.

== Background ==
Lewis Sorley was born in 1934, in West Point, New York, the son and grandson of officers in the United States Army who were both also West Point graduates. Sorley became an Eagle Scout in San Antonio, Texas, in 1950 and was presented the Distinguished Eagle Scout Award in 2009. He received his high school education at Texas Military Institute, where he is listed as a distinguished graduate, and was admitted to the United States Military Academy, from which he graduated with a Bachelor of Science degree in military engineering in 1956.

== Career ==
From August to December 1956, he attended Armor Officer Basic Course, Fort Knox, Kentucky. In January 1957, he attended Parachute and Jumpmaster Courses, Fort Benning, Georgia. From February through October he was assigned to Company H, 2nd Armored Cavalry Regiment, Fort Meade, Maryland as a reconnaissance platoon leader. Then he was promoted to company commander. In October, he went with an advance party (Operation Gyroscope, in which the entire regiment went to Germany, taking the place of another regiment there that came back to Fort Meade) as executive officer (XO) of Company H, a part of the 3rd Squadron, 2nd Armored Cavalry Regiment in Amberg, West Germany. From October 1957 to June 1960 he served with 3rd Squadron, 2nd Armored Cavalry Regiment, in Amberg as XO of Company H, a tank platoon leader in Tank Company and Squadron S-4 (Supply Officer). From June 1960 to June 1961 he commanded A Company, 6th Armored Cavalry Regiment, at Fort Knox, Kentucky. From June 1961 until May 1962, he attended the Armor Officer Advance Course at The Armor School, Fort Knox, Kentucky.

In 1963, he received a Master of Arts degree in English literature from the University of Pennsylvania. From 1963 to 1966 he served at the United States Military Academy as an instructor and assistant professor in the Department of English. From 1966 to 1967 he served as executive officer, 1st Tank Battalion, 69th Armor, U.S. Army in the Republic of Vietnam. From 1968 to 1970 he served as assistant secretary of the General Staff, Office of the Chief of Staff, U.S. Army. In 1971 and 1972 he was commander, 2nd Battalion, 37th Armor, U.S. Army, Erlangen, West Germany. In 1973 he joined the faculty of the U.S. Army War College as the program director in the Department of Military Planning and Strategy. While there, he completed a Master of Public Administration at Pennsylvania State University. He also attended Harvard University and the U.S. Naval War College. In 1975 he became the senior military assistant to the director of net assessment, Office of the Secretary of Defense, where he served for two years.

In 1976, he retired from the Army as a lieutenant colonel and joined the Central Intelligence Agency (CIA), where he became the chief of the Policy and Plans Division, Intelligence Community Staff. In 1978 he became a senior inspector in the Office of Inspector General. In 1979 he was appointed chief of audit support and was awarded a Doctor of Philosophy in national security policy from Johns Hopkins University. In 1982 he was appointed office director and program manager, National Intelligence Emergency Support Office, where he served until 1983.

He was associated with the Center for Strategic and International Studies from 1984 to 1985 and was a member of the advisory council of National Defense Intelligence College as well as the International Institute for Strategic Studies.

In the 1990s, Sorley began writing about the Vietnam War, about which he published multiple books. He gained attention for his unorthodox view on the war, positing that the United States had effectively won the war by 1970, but victory slipped away only because the Americans did not uphold obligations to South Vietnam. Many military officers were sympathetic to his argument, while some historians still dismissed the notion that the United States was ever in a position to win. His 2004 book Vietnam Chronicles: the Abrams Tapes won the Army Historical Foundation's Trefry Award for providing "a unique perspective on the art of command".

His 2008 book Honor Bright: History and Origins of the West Point Honor Code and System points out the similarities between the West Point motto of "Duty, Honor, Country" and the Boy Scouts of America's Scout Oath, stating that each may have influenced the other, pointing out that last part of the Scout Oath was once part of the Cadet Prayer: "...physically strong, mentally awake, and morally straight."

== Personal life and death ==
Sorley was twice married and had a daughter from his first marriage, who predeceased him. He married his second wife, Virginia Mezey Becker (d. February 2024), in 1970, and became a stepfather to her three children from a prior marriage. He lived in Potomac, Maryland, for many years, but in 2019 moved to a retirement home in Carlisle, Pennsylvania, where he died on September 25, 2024, at the age of 90.

== Awards and accomplishments ==
- Who's Who in America 2001–20??
- Distinguished Graduate, United States Military Academy
- Outstanding Alumnus, Army War College
- Distinguished Eagle Scout
- Distinguished Writing Award, Army Historical Foundation
- Goodpaster Prize, American Veterans Center
- Trefry Prize, Army Historical Foundation
- Gold Medallion, Order of St. George, United States Armor Association
- Distinguished Book Award, Army Historical Foundation
- Peterson Prize, Best Scholarly Article on American Military History
- Distinguished Graduate, Texas Military Institute
- Distinguished Graduate, School of Naval Command & Staff
- Pi Alpha Alpha, National Honorary Society for Public Administration
- Freedoms Foundation, George Washington Honor Medal
- Distinguished Member of the Regiment, 37th Armor
- Emeritus Director of the Army Historical Foundation
- Executive Director Emeritus of the Association of Military Colleges and Schools of the United States
- Interviewed for Ken Burns's series The Vietnam War

== Faculty appointments ==
- Gottwald Visiting Professor of Leadership and Ethics, Virginia Military Institute (Spring 2009)
- Adjunct Professor, Defense Intelligence College (1988) and Virginia Tech (1980)
- Program Director, Department of Military Planng and Strategy, US Army War College (1973–1975)
- Visiting Lecturer, University of Virginia (1970), The George Washington University (1969), and the University of Rhode Island (1967–1968)
- Instructor and assistant professor, United States Military Academy (1963–1966)

== Selected works ==
- Westmoreland: The General Who Lost Vietnam. Boston: Houghton Mifflin Harcourt, 2011. ISBN 9780547518268 OCLC 694830152
- Sorley, Lewis, editor. The Vietnam War: An Assessment by South Vietnam's Generals. Lubbock, Tex: Texas Tech University Press, 2010. ISBN 9780896726437 OCLC 262883089
- Honor Bright: History and Origins of the West Point Honor Code and System. Columbus: McGraw Hill, 2008. ISBN 9780073537788
- Vietnam Chronicles: the Abrams Tapes, 1968–1972. Lubbock: Texas Tech University Press, 2004. ISBN 0896725332 OCLC 54391939
- A Better War: The Unexamined Victories and Final Tragedy of America's Last Years in Vietnam. Orlando: Houghton Mifflin, 1999. ISBN 0151002665 OCLC 40609184
- Honorable Warrior: General Harold K. Johnson and the Ethics of Command. Lawrence: University Press of Kansas, 1999. ISBN 0700608869 OCLC 38043059
- Thunderbolt: General Creighton Abrams and the Army of His Times. New York: Simon & Schuster, 1992. ISBN 0671701150 OCLC 25549278
- Arms Transfers Under Nixon: A Policy Analysis. Lexington: The University Press of Kentucky, 1981 ISBN 978-0813104041 OCLC 973117620
