= Bruce Magruder =

U.S. Army major general (1882–1953)

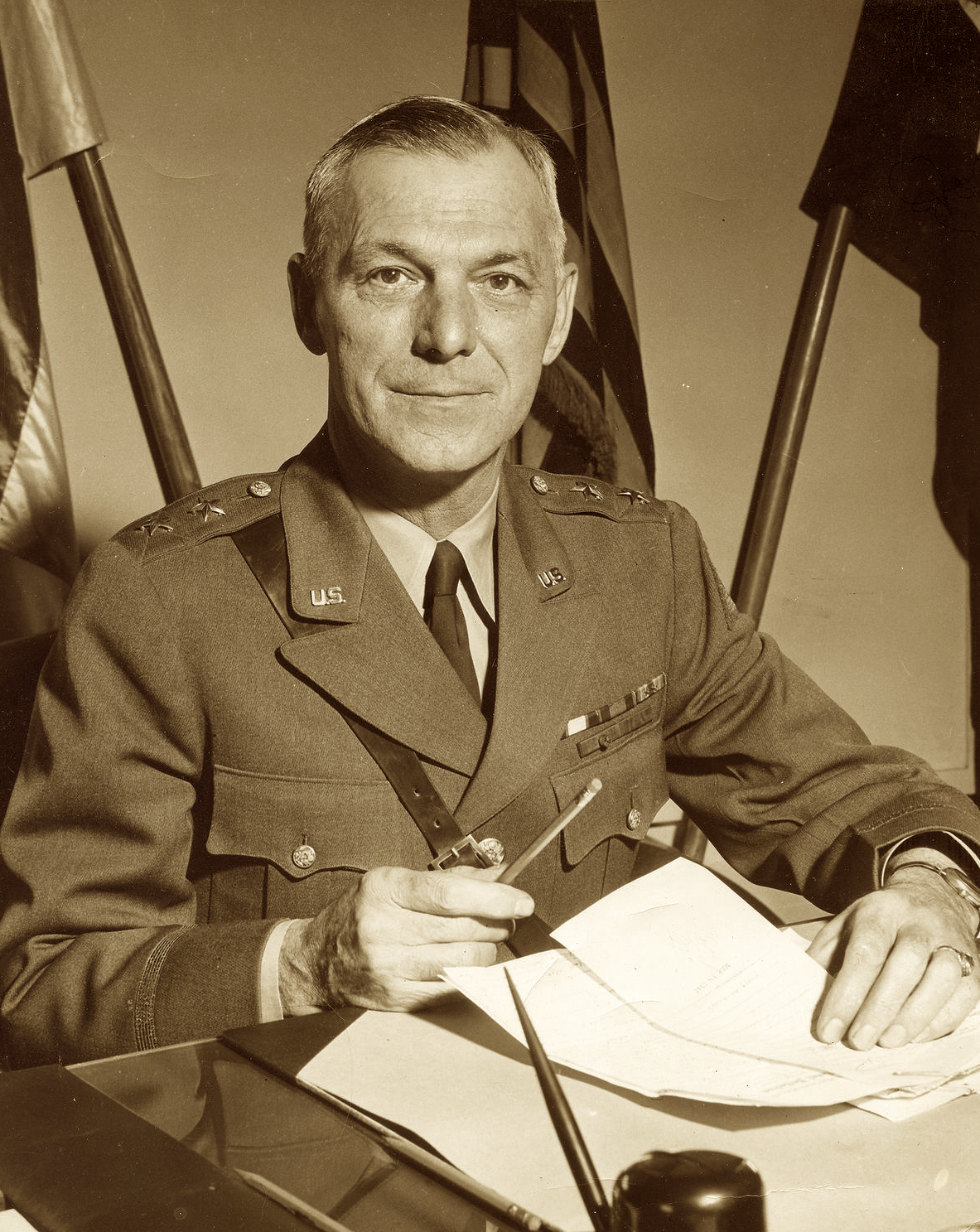
- Magruder as commander of 1st Armored Division at Fort Knox, circa 1941
- Born: December 3, 1882; Washington, D.C., U.S.
- Died: July 23, 1953 (aged 70); Orlando, Florida, U.S.
- Burial place: Arlington National Cemetery
- Spouse(s): Clara Ferol Lott (m. 1912-div. c. 1930); Ethel (Marshall) Stevenson (m. 1935-1953, his death)
- Children: 2
- Military career
- Allegiance: United States
- Branch: United States Army
- Service years: 1904-1946
- Rank: Major General
- Unit: U.S. Army Infantry Branch
- Commands: 1st Battalion, 62nd Coast Artillery Regiment; Reserve Officers' Training Corps, North Carolina Agricultural and Technical College; 66th Armor Regiment; Washington Provisional Brigade; 7th Provisional Tank Brigade; 1st Armored Division; Infantry Replacement Training Center, Camp Wolters, Texas
- Conflicts: Moro Rebellion; Pancho Villa Expedition; World War I World War II
- Awards: Army Distinguished Service Medal; Legion of Merit; French Legion of Honor (Chevalier); Belgian Order of the Crown

Bruce Magruder (December 3, 1882 – July 23, 1953) was a career officer in the United States Army. A veteran of the Moro Rebellion, Pancho Villa Expedition, World War I, and World War II, he attained the rank of major general. Magruder was most notable as the first commander of the 1st Armored Division and commander of the Infantry Replacement Center at Camp Wolters, Texas, during World War II.

A native of Washington, D.C., Magruder was an officer in Washington's YMCA cadet corps during his high school years, and gained his initial experience as a first lieutenant in the District of Columbia National Guard. After high school, Magruder attended the Maryland Agricultural College and Columbian University (now George Washington University). He enlisted in the United States Army as a private in 1904, served for three years, and attained the rank of sergeant. In 1907, he passed the competitive examination for a commission and was appointed a second lieutenant of Infantry. Early officer assignments included the Philippines during the Moro Rebellion, stateside service at Fort Mackenzie, Wyoming, and assignment to the Texas–Mexico border during the Pancho Villa Expedition.

During World War I, Magruder was a temporary major in the Intelligence Section (G-2) of the American Expeditionary Forces headquarters in France. He was promoted to temporary lieutenant colonel in November 1918, and his wartime service was recognized with award of Army Distinguished Service Medal, French Legion of Honor (Chevalier), and Belgian Order of the Crown. After the war, Magruder's assignments included the G-2 section of the Army staff at the War Department, instructor for the Organized Reserve Corps of the Third Corps Area, and professor of military science and commander of the Reserve Officers' Training Corps program at North Carolina College of Agricultural and Mechanic Arts (A&M).

As the United States Army began to expand in anticipation of entry into World War II, Magruder took command of the 7th Provisional Tank Brigade, which experimented with mounted warfare tactics and equipment. In July 1940, he was selected as the first commander of the 1st Armored Division. By now a major general, in March 1942 Magruder was succeeded as division commander by Orlando Ward and assigned to command the Infantry Replacement Training Center (IRTC) at Camp Wolters, Texas. He served at this post until the end of the war, and his service was recognized with award of the Legion of Merit. Magruder retired in 1946 and lived first in Biloxi, Mississippi, and later in Winter Park, Florida. He died at the Orlando Air Force Base Hospital on July 23, 1953, and was buried at Arlington National Cemetery.

== Early life ==
Magruder was born in Washington, D.C., on December 3, 1882, a son of George Washington Corbin Magruder (1855–1936) and Eleanor Ann Helen Marshall (1852–1906). He was educated in the public schools of Washington, and graduated from Central High School in 1903.

Set on a military career from an early age, Magruder served as a first lieutenant and captain in the Washington YMCA's cadet corps, which he commanded during drill and ceremony competitions and similar events, including the March 1901 inauguration of President William McKinley. In addition, he gained his initial military experience during high school when he enlisted in the District of Columbia National Guard and was commissioned as a first lieutenant in Company D, 6th Battalion.

Magruder's additional education included Emerson Preparatory School and Maryland Agricultural College. He also attended Columbian University (now George Washington University) as a member of the class of 1907, and he joined the Theta Delta Chi fraternity. In 1904, he enlisted in the United States Army as a private. Assigned to the 87th Coast Artillery Company, he served at Fort Totten, New York until 1907 and attained the rank of sergeant.

== Start of career ==
After attaining noncommissioned officer rank, Magruder competed for an Army commission. He passed the multi-day examination, and on February 11, 1907, he received appointment as a second lieutenant of Infantry. Assigned to the 18th Infantry Regiment, Magruder soon departed for occupation duty in the Philippines. He served there until 1910, and took part in the Moro Rebellion, in which the United States acted to end an insurgency by the Moro people.

After returning to the United States, Magruder served at Fort Mackenzie, Wyoming. He was promoted to first lieutenant on July 19, 1911. From 1912 to 1913, he served as aide-de-camp to Brigadier General Frederick Appleton Smith. In 1913, Magruder returned to the Philippines, this time stationed at Fort William McKinley. He was promoted to captain on July 1, 1916. In October 1917, Magruder was appointed adjutant of the post at Fort Oglethorpe, Georgia, when the post began to expand in anticipation of U.S. entry into World War I.

== World War I ==
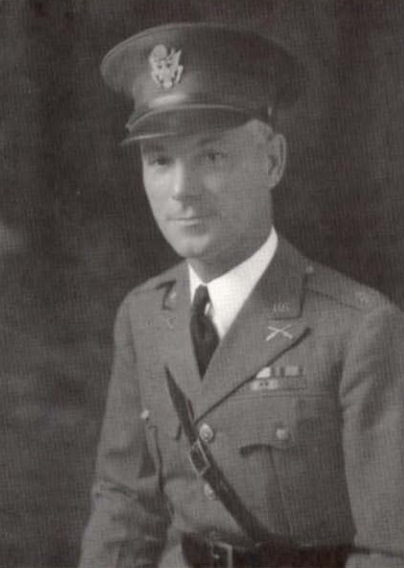
Magruder as a lieutenant colonel in 1919

In November 1917, Magruder was promoted to temporary major and assigned as executive officer of the Intelligence Section (G-2) on the staff of the American Expeditionary Forces headquarters in France. He was promoted to temporary lieutenant colonel in November 1918. Magruder served on the AEF staff until the end of the war, except for a brief period of temporary duty on the staff of I Corps. He received the Army Distinguished Service Medal after the war in recognition of his superior performance of duty. In addition, Magruder was a recipient of the French Legion of Honor (Chevalier) and Belgian Order of the Crown.

The citation for his Army DSM reads:

The President of the United States of America, authorized by Act of Congress, July 9, 1918, takes pleasure in presenting the Army Distinguished Service Medal to Lieutenant Colonel (Infantry) Bruce Magruder, United States Army, for exceptionally meritorious and distinguished services to the Government of the United States, in a duty of great responsibility during World War I. As Executive Officer of the Intelligence Section at General Headquarters, by his marked ability and zeal Lieutenant Colonel Magruder performed duties of a most exacting nature, in connection with the administration and development of the section, with conspicuous merit, rendering services of great value to the American Expeditionary Forces.

== Post-World War I ==
Magruder returned from France in 1919 and was assigned to the G-2 section of the Army staff at the War Department. On July 1, 1920, he was reduced from temporary lieutenant colonel to his permanent rank of major. In 1922, Magruder was selected for attendance at the Infantry Officer Advanced Course (now the Maneuver Captains Career Course), and he graduated in 1923. In 1925, he began attendance at the United States Army Command and General Staff College. He completed the course in 1926, and was ranked as a distinguished graduate. After graduating, he remained at Fort Leavenworth, Kansas, to serve on the Staff College faculty. In 1927, he was reassigned to the staff of the Army's Chief of Infantry. He was later assigned as an instructor for the Organized Reserve Corps of the Third Corps Area, with offices in Washington, D.C. On May 27, 1930, Magruder was promoted to Lieutenant colonel.

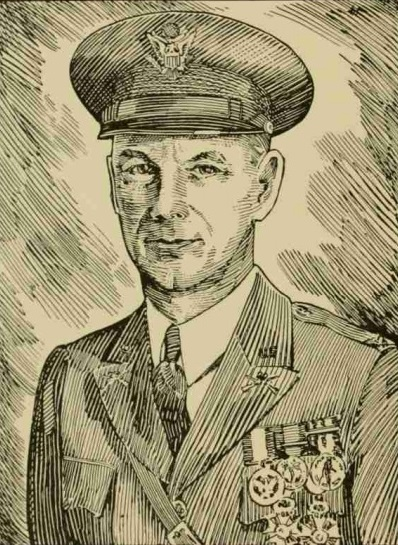
Stylized portrait of Magruder from the dedication page of the North Carolina College of Agricultural and Mechanic Arts 1936 yearbook

While stationed in Washington, Magruder also served as an instructor for officers of the Organized Reserve Corps's 330th Infantry Regiment. In addition, he commanded 1st Battalion, 62nd Coast Artillery Regiment. From 1931 to 1936, Magruder served as a professor of military science for the Reserve Officers' Training Corps program at North Carolina College of Agricultural and Mechanic Arts (A&M). He later commanded the program, and he received promotion to colonel on August 1, 1935.

In 1936 and 1937, Magruder commanded the 66th Armor Regiment at Camp Meade, Maryland. When the regiment received its first two light tanks, unit members decided to name one for Magruder, and his wife took part in the christening ceremony. From 1937 to 1940, Magruder served as executive officer of the Infantry Center and School at Fort Benning, Georgia. He was promoted to brigadier general on November 1, 1939. In 1940, he served as commander of the Washington Provisional Brigade, the precursor to the Military District of Washington.

== World War II ==
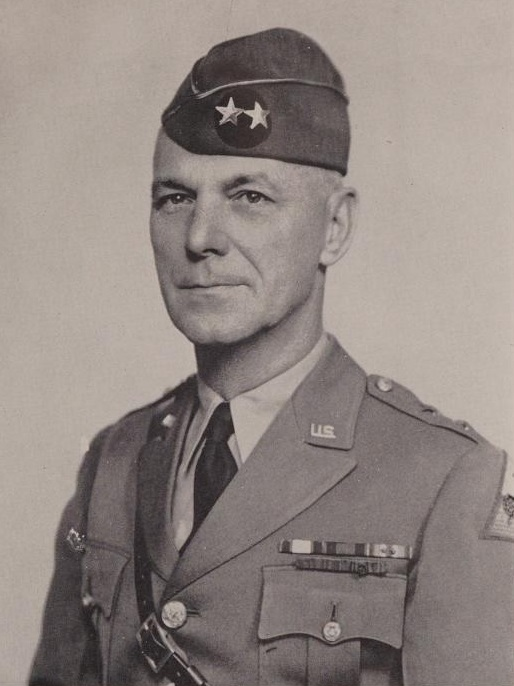
From 1941's Historical and Pictorial Review: First Armored Division of the United States Army

As the Army began to organize and train in anticipation of entry into World War II, Magruder was assigned to command the 7th Provisional Tank Brigade, which experimented with tactics and equipment. Convinced by the results of the May 1940 Third United States Army maneuvers that the United States would need to field an armored force for the war, tank and Cavalry unit commanders including Magruder, Charles L. Scott, George S. Patton, and Adna R. Chaffee Jr. agreed to recommend its creation to George Marshall, the Chief of Staff of the United States Army. Marshall concurred, and the Army organized and fielded the I Armored Corps. Chaffee was assigned as corps commander, with Magruder assigned in July 1940 as commander of the 1st Armored Division and Scott assigned to command the 2nd Armored Division.

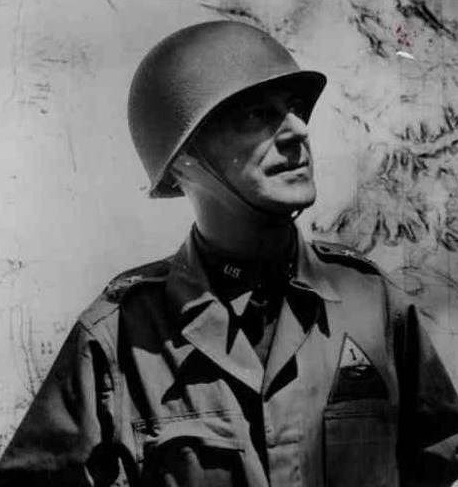
Magruder as commander of 1st Armored Division in the summer of 1941

As the first commander of the 1st Armored Division, Magruder organized and equipped it at Fort Knox, Kentucky, using personnel, vehicles, and weapons from the 7th Cavalry Brigade and 6th Infantry Regiment. In addition, Magruder received credit for devising the division's nickname, "Old Ironsides". He was promoted to major general on October 1, 1940. When the Army formed additional Armored divisions in 1941, Magruder's 1st provided experienced and trained soldiers as the cadre around which the new 4th Armored Division was created.

In March 1942, Magruder was succeeded as division commander by Orlando Ward. He was then assigned as commander of the Infantry Replacement Training Center (IRTC) at Camp Wolters, Texas. Responsible for providing trained and ready soldiers to units fighting in Europe and the Pacific, Magruder remained in charge of the IRTC until after the end of the war in 1945, and was succeeded by Brigadier General Maurice L. Miller.

Magruder received the Legion of Merit to commend his service with the 1st Armored Division and IRTC. After leaving the IRTC, Magruder was unassigned pending retirement. His duties included inspection visits to the ROTC program at North Carolina A&T and participation in events organized by the Reserve Officers Association. He retired on May 31, 1946.

== Retirement and death ==
In retirement, Magruder was a resident of first Biloxi, Mississippi, then Winter Park, Florida. He died at the Orlando Air Force Base Hospital in Orlando on July 23, 1953. He was buried at Arlington National Cemetery.

== Family ==
In 1912, Magruder married Clara Ferol Lott (1891–1955). They divorced before 1930, and in 1935 he married Ethel (Marshall) Stevenson. With his first wife, Magruder was the father of sons Bruce Jr., (1922–2017) an officer in the United States Marine Corps, and William (1923–1977), who served as a United States Air Force officer.

Magruder's siblings included Marshall Magruder, a career Army officer who attained the rank of brigadier general. Magruder was also a collateral descendant of George Washington. A great-great-great-grandnephew, he traced his family line through both Washington's brother John Augustine Washington and Washington's half-brother Augustine Washington Jr.

Military offices
Preceded by Newly activated organization	Commanding General 1st Armored Division; 1940–1942	Succeeded by Orlando Ward
