= Carolina Maneuvers =

1941 US military exercise

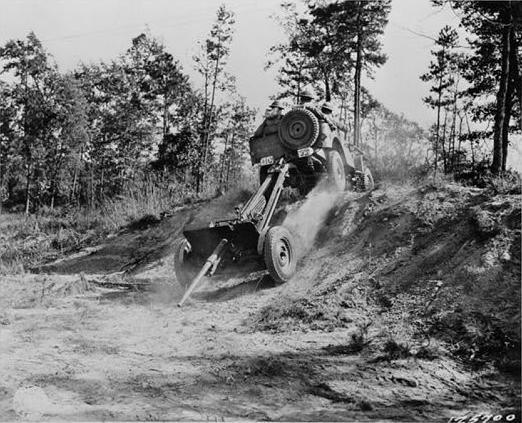
A jeep tows a 37-mm gun in Wadesboro, North Carolina

The Carolina Maneuvers were a series of United States Army exercises held around the border of North Carolina and South Carolina in 1941. The exercises, which involved some 350,000 troops, were designed to evaluate United States training, logistics, doctrine, and commanders.

== Order of battle ==
=== Carolinas Phase I ===
==== Red Force ====
- IV Corps (Major General Oscar W. Criswold)
  - 3d Cavalry Regiment (mounted)
  - 6th Cavalry Regiment (mounted)
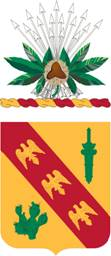
  - 107th Cavalry Regiment (Horse-Mechanized)
  - 4th Motorized Division (Brigadier General Fred C. Wallace)
  - 31st Division (Brigadier General Louis F. Guerre)
  - 43rd Division (Brigadier General John H. Hester)
  - 502nd Parachute Battalion
  - I Armored Corps (Major General Charles L. Scott)
    - 1st Armored Division (Major General Bruce Magruder)
    - 2nd Armored Division (Major General George S. Patton)
  - 3rd Air Support Command (Colonel Asa N. Duncan)
    - 2nd Bombardment Wing
    - 10th Pursuit Wing

==== Blue Force ====
- First Army (Lieutenant General Hugh A. Drum)
  - First Army's antitank force consisted of six regimental-sized antitank units:
    - GHQ-X (released to II Corps)
    - GHQ-Y (released to VI Corps)
    - GHQ-Z (released to I Corps)
    - Tank Attacker-1
    - Tank Attacker-2
    - Tank Attacker-3
  - 191st Tank Battalion
  - AB-1 (Anti-airborne task force to protect the First Army's rear areas from enemy paratroopers)
  - 1st Division (Major General Donald C. Cubbison) (released to VI Corps)
  - 9th Division (Brigadier General Rene Edward De Russy Hoyle)
  - I Corps (Major General Charles F. Thompson)
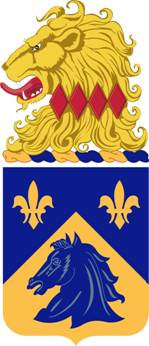
    - 102nd Cavalry Regiment (Horse-Mechanized)
    - 8th Division (Major General James P. Marley)
    - 30th Division (Major General Henry D. Russell)
  - II Corps (Major General Lloyd R. Fredendall)
    - 104th Cavalry Regiment (Horse-Mechanized)
    - 28th Division (Major General Edward Martin)
    - 29th Division (Major General Milton A. Reckord) (released to VI Corps)
    - 44th Division (Brigadier General James I. Muir)
  - VI Corps (Major General Karl Truesdell)
    - 101st Cavalry Regiment (Horse-Mechanized)
    - 26th Division (Major General Roger W. Eckfeldt)
  - 1st Air Support Command (Colonel William E. Kepner)
    - 3d Bombardment Group
    - 6th Pursuit Wing

=== Carolinas Phase II ===
==== Red Force ====
- IV Corps (Major General Oscar W. Criswold)
  - 3d Cavalry Regiment (mounted)
  - 6th Cavalry Regiment (mechanized)
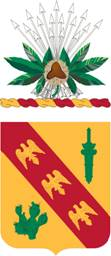
  - 107th Cavalry Regiment (mounted)
  - 4th Motorized Division (Brigadier General Fred C. Wallace)
  - 31st Division (Brigadier General Louis F. Guerre)
  - 43rd Division (Brigadier General John H. Hester)
  - I Armored Corps (Major General Charles L. Scott)
    - 1st Armored Division (Major General Bruce Magruder)
    - 2nd Armored Division (Major General George S. Patton)
  - 3rd Air Support Command (Colonel Asa N. Duncan)
    - 2nd Bombardment Wing (-17th Bombardment Group)
    - 10th Pursuit Wing

==== Blue Force ====
- First Army (Lieutenant General Hugh A. Drum)
  - First Army's Anti-Tank force consist of six regimental-size antitank units
    - GHQ-X (released to II Corps)
    - GHQ-Y (released to VI Corps)
    - GHQ-Z (released to I Corps)
    - Tank Attacker-1 (released to VI Corps)
    - Tank Attacker-2 (released to I Corps)
    - Tank Attacker-3
  - 191st Tank Battalion
  - AB-1 (Anti-Airborne Task Force to protect the First Army's rear areas from Paratroopers)
  - 1st Division (Major General Donald C. Cubbison) (released to VI Corps)
  - 8th Division (Major General James P. Marley) (released to I Corps)
  - 502nd Parachute Battalion
  - I Corps (Major General Charles F. Thompson)
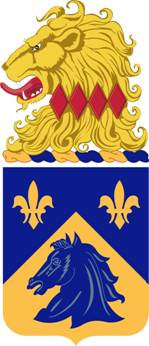
    - 102nd Cavalry Regiment (horse-mechanized)
    - 30th Division (Major General Henry D. Russell)
  - II Corps (Major General Lloyd R. Fredendall)
    - 104th Cavalry Regiment (horse-mechanized)
    - 9th Division (Brigadier General Rene E. De Russey Hoyle)
    - 28th Division (Major General Edward Martin)
    - 44th Division (Brigadier General James I. Muir)
  - VI Corps (Major General Karl Truesdell)
    - 101st Cavalry Regiment (horse-mechanized)
    - 26th Division (Major General Roger R. Eckfeldt)
    - 29th Division (Major General Milton A. Reckord)
  - 1st Air Support Command (Colonel William E. Kepner)
    - 3d Bombardment Group
    - 17th Bombardment Group
    - 6th Pursuit Wing
