= Charles L. Scott =

American politician (1827–1899)

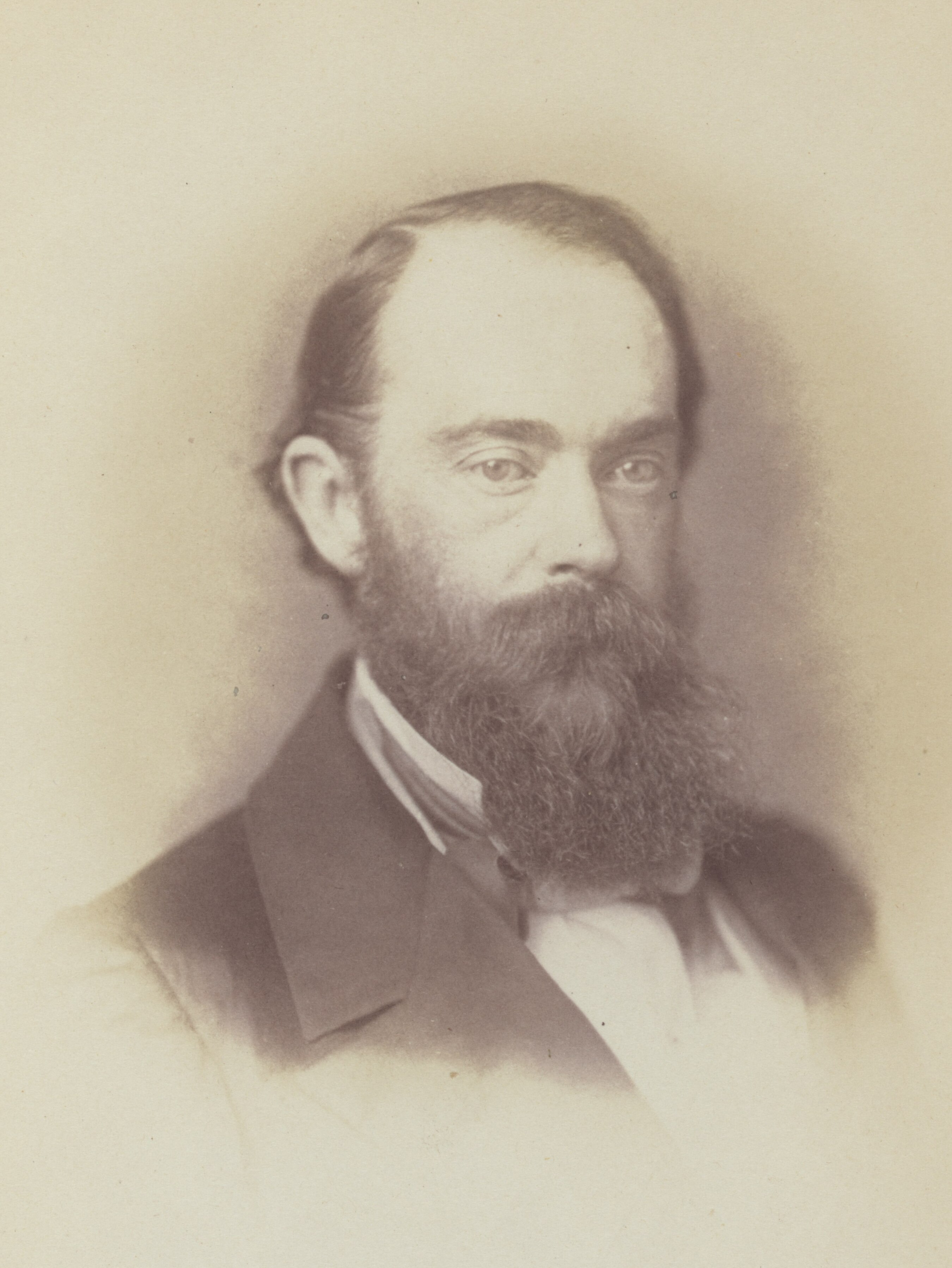
- Portrait by Julian Vannerson, 1859

United States Ambassador to Venezuela
- In office April 28, 1885 – January 18, 1889
- President: Grover Cleveland
- Preceded by: Jehu Baker
- Succeeded by: William L. Scruggs

Member of the U.S. House of Representatives from California's at-large district
- In office March 4, 1857 – March 3, 1861
- Preceded by: Philemon T. Herbert
- Succeeded by: Aaron A. Sargent

Personal details
- Born: January 23, 1827 Richmond, Virginia, U.S.
- Died: April 30, 1899 (aged 72) Mobile County, Alabama, U.S.
- Party: Democratic
- Relations: Charles L. Scott (grandson)
- Education: College of William and Mary

Military service
- Allegiance: Confederate States
- Branch/service: (Confederate States of America) Confederate States Army
- Years of service: 1861–1862
- Rank: Major
- Battles/wars: American Civil War; First Battle of Bull Run; Battle of Seven Pines

Charles Lewis Scott (January 23, 1827 – April 30, 1899) was an American lawyer, politician, and Civil War veteran. He served two terms in the United States House of Representatives as a Democrat from California from 1857 to 1861.

== Biography ==
=== Family ===
Charles L. Scott was born January 23, 1827, in Richmond, Virginia. His father was Robert G. Scott, a well known attorney and politician of Richmond, who was born in McIntosh County, Georgia, and died in Alabama. His mother was Susan Randolph Madison, daughter of Rt. Rev. Bishop James Madison of Virginia. His grandfather was Col. William Scott, born 1752 in Virginia and lived in Camden County, Georgia. His children included Robert Gormain Scott (1860–1927), whose children included Major General Charles L. Scott.

=== Education and early career ===
Charles Lewis Scott attended public schools and Richmond Academy. In 1846 he graduated from the College of William and Mary, Williamsburg, Virginia. He then studied law and was admitted to the bar in 1847, practicing in Richmond.

During the 1849 California Gold Rush he went to California and mined gold.

In 1851, he resumed practicing law in Sonora.

=== Congress ===
Scott was a member of the State assembly during 1854–1856. In 1856, he was elected to the 35th Congress, serving until 1861. While in Congress, he married a young woman he met in Mobile, Alabama.

=== Civil War ===
When the American Civil War began, he resigned his seat in Congress and joined the Fourth Regiment, Alabama Volunteer Infantry, of the Confederate Army, serving as major. He never returned to California. In 1861 he suffered a serious leg wound at the First Battle of Bull Run. The severity of his leg pain caused him to resign his commission in 1862, after the Battle of Seven Pines.

=== Later career and death ===
After the war, Scott farmed in Wilcox County, Alabama, then during 1869–1879 was a journalist. He was a delegate to every Democratic National Convention from the end of the Civil War to 1896. In 1885, he was appointed by President Cleveland as minister to Venezuela, serving until he resigned in 1889. He returned to the U.S. and farmed.

Scott died April 30, 1899, near Mount Pleasant, Monroe County, Alabama, and is buried at a private cemetery at Cedar Hill, Alabama.

U.S. House of Representatives
Preceded by Philemon T. Herbert	Member of the U.S. House of Representatives from California's at-large congressional district 1857–1861	Succeeded by Aaron A. Sargent
Diplomatic posts
Preceded by Jehu Baker	United States Minister to Venezuela; 1885–1889	Succeeded by William L. Scruggs
