= Jacob F. Wolters =

American politician, lawyer and military officer (1871–1935)

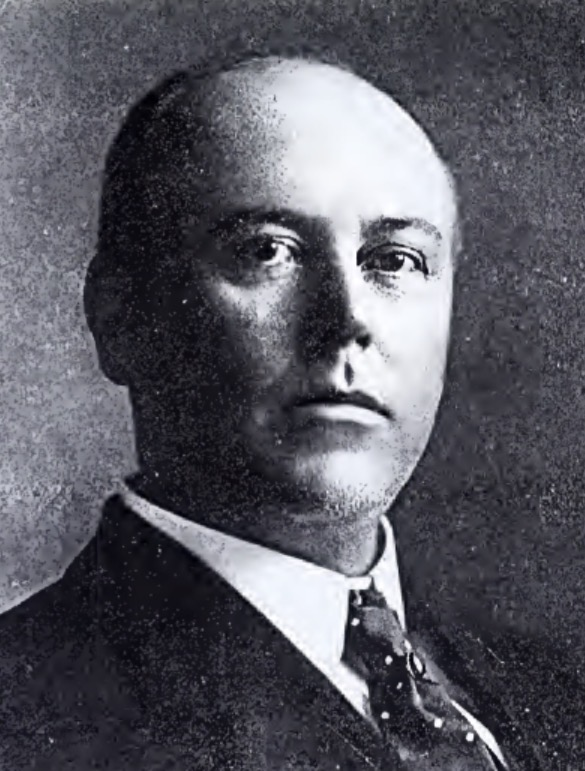
- Wolters in a 1918 publication

Member of the Texas House of Representatives from the 45th district
- In office January 12, 1897 – January 10, 1899 Serving with Frederick Albert Schlick
- Preceded by: Andras Ernst Falke; John Christian Speckels
- Succeeded by: Charles Edward Lane; Max Meitzen

Personal details
- Born: Jacob Franklin Wolters; September 2, 1871 Austin County, Texas, US
- Died: October 8, 1935 (aged 64) Austin, Texas, US
- Party: Democratic
- Occupation: Politician, lawyer, military officer

Military service
- Allegiance: United States
- Branch/service: United States Army
- Rank: Major general
- Unit: 56th Cavalry Brigade
- Battles/wars: Spanish–American War; World War I

Jacob Franklin Wolters (September 2, 1871 – October 8, 1935) was an American politician, lawyer, and military officer. A Democrat, he was a member of the Texas House of Representatives.

Born in Austin County, Texas, Wolters studied at Texas Christian University and practiced law. A member of the Texas House from 1897 to 1899, he continued his political career as an anti-Prohibition leader.

A veteran in the Spanish–American War and World War I, he commanded the 56th Cavalry Brigade in the latter and in multiple declarations of martial law in Texas afterward, including to suppress protest by oil workers. He published two books about the military. Wolters retired from his military career as a major general of the reserve, and Fort Wolters near Mineral Texas was named after him in 1925.

After leaving politics and the military, he continued to provide legal services for companies in Texas including railroad companies, like Pullman Company, and oil companies like Texaco.

== Early life and early career ==
Wolters was born on September 2, 1871, in Austin County, Texas, on a farm between Industry and New Ulm. He was the son of farmer and businessman Theodore Henry Wolters and Margaret (née Wink) Wolters. He was of Dutch and German descent.

Wolters's family moved to Lavaca County c. 1878, then to Fayette County the following year. He was taught German until age 8, with him learning the English alphabet from The Galveston Daily News. Educated at public schools in Schulenburg, he studied at Texas Christian University for two years. He then read law in La Grange.

Wolters was admitted to the bar in 1892, after which he was elected district attorney of Fayette County. On June 30, 1905, he moved to Houston, where he established a law partnership with Jonathan Lane and James X. Storey.

== Politics ==
Wolters was a Democrat. He was a member of the Texas House of Representatives, from January 12, 1897, to January 10, 1899, representing the 45th district. While serving, he was a member of the Committees on Internal Improvements; on the Judiciary; on Privileges and Elections; and on Public Buildings and Grounds.

Wolters was a candidate for Presidential elector in the 1900 election, later serving as one in the 1904 election. In 1902, he was chairman of Texas's 9th congressional district, as which he helped in the campaign of George F. Burgess. He was an unsuccessful candidate in the Democratic Party primaries for the United States Senate, losing to Morris Sheppard. He appeared at the 1928 Democratic National Convention and was made director of the Convention Band Committee, as which he decided to play no classical music.

Wolters opposed Prohibition. In 1908, he was made chairman of the Texas Anti-Prohibition Organization, helping to defeat a proposed state constitutional amendment to establish prohibition the same year. The manager of a 1911 campaign against Prohibition, he was made to testify before the Texas House of Representatives, though refused to answer questions he saw as "immaterial and impertinent". For his noncompliance, the House voted to jail him for 24 hours for contempt of court; he was released on a $500 bond, never being jailed. In 1918, he collaborated with the Anti-Saloon League of Texas to help elect William P. Hobby governor.

Ideologically, Wolters aligned himself with the Democratic platform above all. He pushed for the Southern United States to modernize and grow economically. He was for small government and supported the government as it operated. He supported competition law, opposing monopolies and tariffs, the latter with the exception of for government revenue. He supported improvements to water infrastructure, such as expansions to the Panama Canal.

== Military service ==
From 1890 or 1891 until 1896, Wolters served as a private in the Fayette Light Guards of the Texas Military Forces. He served in the Spanish–American War, in 1898, as a first lieutenant in Troop H of the 1st Texas Cavalry Regiment, being stationed on the Mexico–Texas border. During World War I, Wolters organized the 56th Cavalry Brigade.

In June 1919, Wolters led the 56th Cavalry Brigade through Corpus Christi after a declaration of martial law by Governor Hobby to handle the aftermath of a hurricane. Also in 1919, Hobby ordered him to command troops in Galveston to calm the 1920 Galveston longshoremen's strike. In 1922, he was sent to Mexia by Pat Morris Neff to combat unrest caused by the discovery of oil in the region. In 1929, he went to Borger to restore peace lost from discoveries of oil. In August 1931, he commanded troops in East Texas oil fields in August 1931. He refused to let Alvin M. Owsley host a speaking event to protest the martial law, though the event may have been held unlawfully. He was to retire from the unit at age 65, though died before reaching the age.

On April 1, 1918, Wolters was promoted to brigadier general. On July 25, 1921, President Warren G. Harding nominated him for brigadier general of the United States Army Reserve, with him being approved by the United States Senate in August. In 1925, Fort Wolters was established and named for him. On May 22, 1934, he was nominated by President Franklin D. Roosevelt for brigadier general of the National Guard. Shortly before his retirement from the Reserve, he was promoted to major general. When he retired, he was gifted an inscribed silver cup which read "an unpleasant duty well performed".

== Later career and personal life ==
Wolters was a stakeholder of the Austin American-Statesman. He published two books: Dawson's Men and the Mier Expedition, and Martial Law and Its Administration, in 1927 and 1930, respectively, both about the military. He was a member of the partnership Lane, Wolters & Storey, later of Wolters, Blanchard, Woodul & Wolters, which represented companies including the Missouri–Kansas–Texas Railroad and the Pullman Company. In 1931, he left the partnership to join the Texaco legal staff, which he worked for until his death.

On April 25, 1893, Wolters married Sallie Drane, with whom he had two sons, Drane and Russell. He was Anglican, as well as a member of the Freemasons, the Knights of Pythias, the Sons of Hermann, and the Woodmen of the World. On November 16, 1933, he got into a vehicle rollover after hitting a hog near Huntsville, fracturing his shoulder and suffering several bruises and cuts. He died on October 8, 1935, aged 64, in Austin, from a myocardial infarction he suffered on October 3. He was buried at Forest Lawn Cemetery, in Houston. In 1989, he was inducted into the Hall of Honor.
