= Armor Branch =

Armored warfare branch of the U.S. Army

Armor
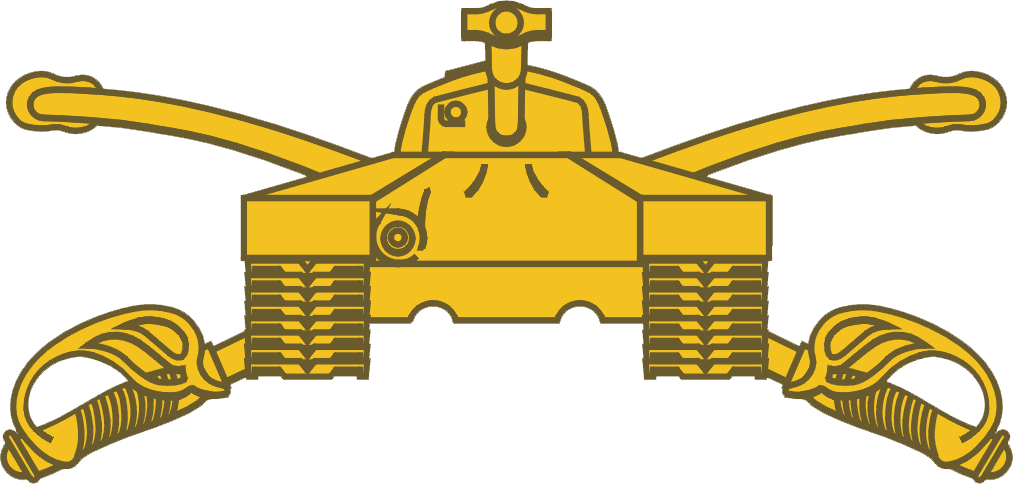
- Armor insignia, featuring crossed sabers with an M26 Pershing tank superimposed on top
- Founded: 10 July 1940
- Country: United States
- Branch: United States Army
- Type: Armor
- Home station: Fort Benning, Georgia
- Patron: St. George is the patron saint of the U.S. Army's Armor Branch.
- Motto: The Combat Arm of Decision
- Branch color: Yellow

The Armor Branch is the armored warfare branch of the United States Army. This branch was formerly considered to be one of the combat arms branches, but is today included within the "Maneuver, Fires and Effects" (MFE) classification, in accordance with current U.S. Army organizational doctrine.

It was created provisionally in 1940 as Armored Force under the Chief of the Armored Force, Brigadier General Adna R. Chaffee, Jr. and took control of all tank units in infantry and cavalry units.

== History ==
Even though the armor branch traces its lineage back to the original cavalry units, its first beginnings date from the First World War. The United States Tank Corps was established in 1918 but then split back into the Infantry and Cavalry in 1921.

The Armored Command was headquartered at Ft. Knox, Kentucky, became effective on 2 July 1943, the Armored Center on 20 February 1944, and was discontinued on 30 October 1945. The Armor Center at Fort Knox Kentucky transferred to Fort Benning, Georgia in 2010. United States Army Armor School is now located at Fort Benning.

I Armored Corps (United States) was established in 1940, and was successively commanded by Adna R. Chaffee Jr., Charles L. Scott, and George S. Patton Jr. The corps fought during Operation Torch in North Africa, but then upgraded in status to become the United States Seventh Army on 10 July 1943.

=== Branch insignia ===
U.S. Army Service Regulation 42, change 1, dated 29 December 1917 authorized "the first insignia for the new tank service." This new insignia was the image of the "front-end view of a conventionalized tank", but in appearance looked like an unidentifiable upper half circle of sort of storage or transport container. A little over 4 months later on 7 May 1918, change 2 to Regulation 42, eliminated the Army's first Tank Service and replaced it with the new U.S. Army Tank Corps, along with a newly designed collar insignia which consisted of the "side view of the Mark VIII tank above two stylized dragons breathing fire over a wreath." In 1921 U.S. Army Circular 72 deactivated the U.S. Army Tank Corps, returning all armored vehicles to the Cavalry and Infantry units, which also removed the new "Tank Corps" collar insignia from the service.

On 10 July 1940 the U.S. Army Armored Force was created and on 25 February 1942 Army Circular 56 created a new collar insignia, consisting of the left side view of a Mark VIII tank. This simple tank design had no decorations or other objects surrounding it, and was the insignia worn by U.S. Army personnel throughout WWII. Presently, the current U.S. Army "Armor" branch collar insignia, which consists of the front view of a U.S. M26 Pershing tank superimposed over two crossed sabers, replaces the WWII collar insignia with the "Army Reorganization Act of 1950, Section 404, Army Bulletin 9", in which the current Armor insignia became authorized to wear in February 1951.

== Publications ==
ARMOR is the professional journal, originally published as the Cavalry Journal in 1885. The name was changed to Armor in 1940 after the transition from Horse Cavalry to Armor for the U.S. Army's Armor Branch, published by the Chief of Armor at Fort Benning, GA., training center for the Army's tank and cavalry forces. It is also one of the oldest publications in the U.S., founded in 1888 by cavalry officers on the American frontier as a forum for discussing doctrine, tactics, and equipment among soldiers geographically separated by the great distances of the American West.

== Weapons ==
- M1A1 – Main Battle Tank
- M1A2 – Main Battle Tank
- Stryker – Armored Fighting Vehicle
- Stryker MGS – Infantry Support Vehicle
- M2 Bradley IFV – Infantry Fighting Vehicle
- M3 Bradley CFV – Cavalry Fighting Vehicle

== Current units ==
- 18th Cavalry Regiment
- 33rd Armor Regiment
- 34th Armor Regiment
- 35th Armor Regiment
- 37th Armor Regiment
- 63rd Armor Regiment
- 64th Armor Regiment
- 66th Armor Regiment
- 67th Armor Regiment
- 68th Armor Regiment
- 69th Armor Regiment
- 70th Armor Regiment
- 77th Armor Regiment
- 103rd Armor Regiment
- 194th Armor Regiment (United States)

== See also ==
- Tanks in the United States
- United States Armor Association
