= Fort Wolters =

Former US military base near Mineral Wells, TX

Coordinates: 32°51′09″N 98°01′52″W

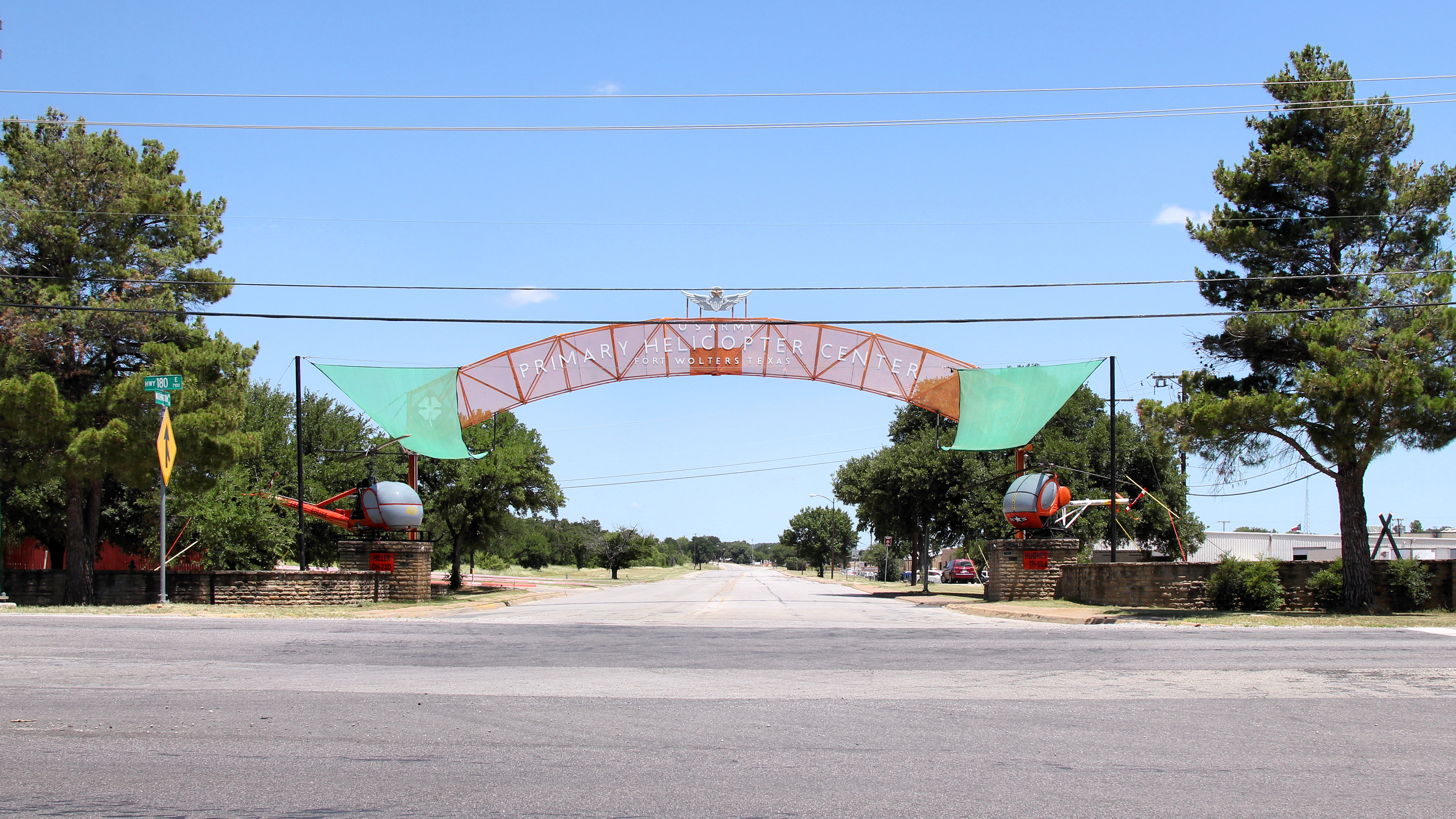
Fort Wolters U.S. Highway 180 gate in 2018

Fort Wolters was a United States military installation four miles northeast of Mineral Wells, Texas.

The fort was originally named Camp Wolters in honor of Brigadier General Jacob F. Wolters, commander of the 56th Cavalry Brigade of the National Guard, which used the area as a summer training ground. It was an Army camp from 1925 until 1946.

During World War II, Camp Wolters was at one time the largest infantry replacement training center in the United States. It was commanded by Major General Bruce Magruder. Camp Wolters also served as a German POW camp during the war.

Several enlisted infantrymen of the war underwent basic training at Camp Wolters:

- Vernon Baker, one of the two recipients of the Medal of Honor from the 92nd Infantry Division during the war, underwent basic training at Camp Wolters as an enlisted infantryman prior to transferring to OCS. Initially awarded the Distinguished Service Cross due to racial discrimination at the time, President Bill Clinton in 1997 presented the Medal of Honor to Baker following an Act of Congress.
- Audie Murphy completed basic training at Camp Wolters. At the age of 19, Murphy received the Medal of Honor after single-handedly holding off an entire company of German soldiers for an hour at the Colmar Pocket in France in January 1945, then leading a successful counterattack while wounded and out of ammunition. He became the most decorated American combat soldier of the war, receiving every military combat award for valor available from the U.S. Army, as well as French and Belgian awards for heroism.
- Eddie Slovik arrived at Camp Wolters for basic training on January 24, 1944. After completing his training, he was sent to France as a replacement. Slovik was convicted of desertion in November 1944, and on 31 January 1945, became the first member of the U.S. military since the American Civil War to be executed for desertion.

After the war, the camp was deactivated and purchased for private use. Due to rising tensions in the Cold War, the site was reactivated as Wolters Air Force Base in 1951.

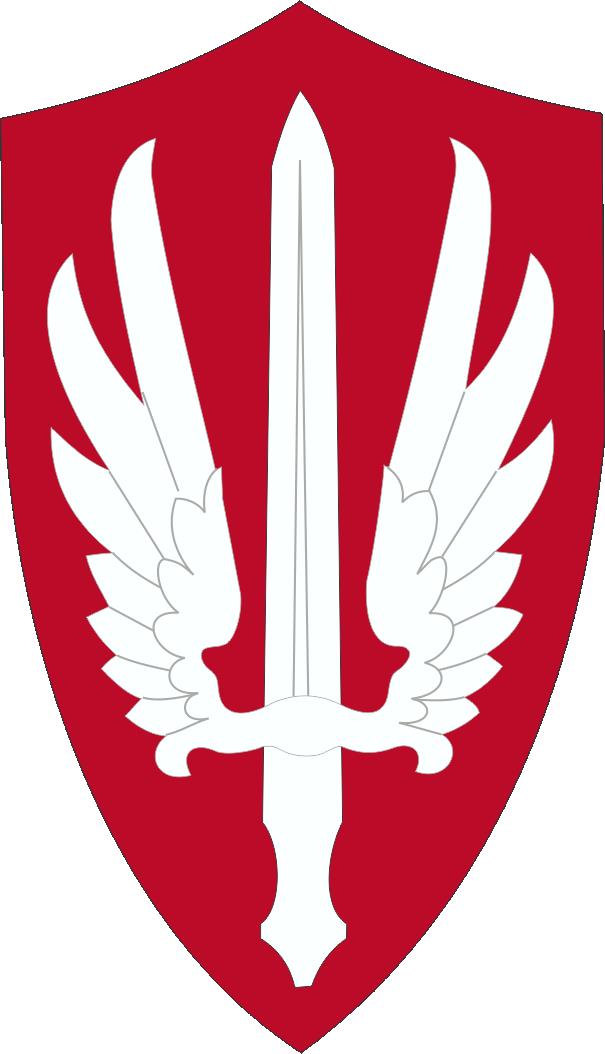
Special Category Army Personnel with the Air Force (SCARWAF) SSI

== Special Category Army Personnel with the Air Force (1951-1956) ==
In 1947, the US Air Force's Far East Air Force (FEAF) needed to upgrade older airfields and build new airfields to support operations in Korea. After the split between the Army and Air Force in 1947, no provision was made for specialized, semiskilled and skilled troops to perform this sort of task. Special Category Army Personnel with the Air Force (SCARWAF) was a provisional Army and Air Force unit that provided personnel who would perform these construction duties. Wolters Air Force Base was one of the facilities that trained SCARWAF units, and later the Aviation Engineer Force that replaced them. It also was used as a storage depot for Air Force equipment.

== United States Army Primary Helicopter School (1956-1973) ==
In 1956, Camp Wolters reverted to the United States Army to house the United States Army Primary Helicopter School. In 1963, it was designated a "permanent" military base and renamed Fort Wolters, a permanent military installation and U.S. Army Primary Helicopter Center.

The facility started with one heliport (Main) and four stage fields. At its height, it had three heliports (Main Heliport, Downing Field, and Dempsey Field) and 25 stage fields (Pinto, Sundance, Ramrod, Mustang, Rawhide, Bronco, Wrangler, An Khe, Bac Lieu, Ben Cat, Ben Hoa, Cam Ranh, Can Tho, Chu Lai, Da Nang, Hue, My Tho, Phu Loi, Pleiku, Qui Nhon, Soc Trang, Tay Ninh, Tuy Hoa, Vinh Long, and Vung Tau). The Vietnamese-named stage fields were named after facilities in Vietnam and were oriented to be the same relation to each other, on a smaller scale, of course, as they were on the map. The other stage fields were Western-themed.

== Postwar use ==
The base was deactivated in 1973. The site is now used as an industrial park with activities including Ventamatic, Ltd, GR's Workshop, a branch of Weatherford College, and a training center for the Texas Army National Guard, and the Texas State Guard. The Texas Department of Criminal Justice also operates a District Parole Office on the site. It is also regularly used as a spot for conducting Airman Leadership School by the Texas Wing of Civil Air Patrol.

== See also ==
- Texas Military Forces
- Texas Military Department
- List of conflicts involving the Texas Military
- Awards and decorations of the Texas Military
- List of World War II prisoner-of-war camps in the United States
