= Charles L. Scott (U.S. Army general) =

U.S. Army general (1883–1954)

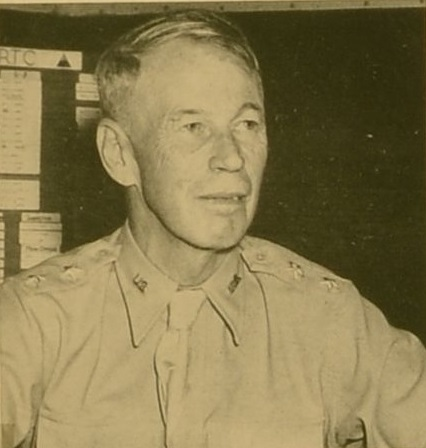
- From 1942's Armoraiders: A Pictorial Review of the Armored Command
- Born: October 22, 1883; Mount Pleasant, Alabama, U.S.
- Died: November 27, 1954 (aged 71); Washington, D.C., U.S.
- Burial place: Arlington National Cemetery
- Spouse: Helen Jeanette Patterson (m. 1912–1954)
- Children: 1
- Relatives: Charles L. Scott (grandfather)
- Military career
- Service: United States Army
- Service years: 1905–1946
- Rank: Major General
- Nicknames: "Lutie", "Scotty"
- Service number: 02048
- Units: Cavalry Branch; Quartermaster Corps
- Commands: Auxiliary Remount Depot, Camp Bowie; Northern Purchasing Zone for Public Animals; Animal Division, U.S. Army Remount Service; U.S. Army Cavalry School; 1932 United States Olympic Equestrian Team; Materiel and Equipment Section, Office of the Chief of Cavalry; 13th Cavalry Regiment; 2nd Armored Division; I Armored Corps; Senior U.S. Military Attaché, Cairo, Egypt; Armor Replacement Center, Fort Knox; U.S. Army Armor School
- Wars: Philippine–American War; World War I World War II
- Awards: Army Distinguished Service Medal

Charles Lewis Scott (October 22, 1883 – November 27, 1954) was a career officer in the United States Army. A veteran of the Philippine–American War, World War I and World War II, Scott's career began when he graduated from the United States Military Academy in 1905. A notable equestrian, he was prominent in the Cavalry Branch prior to the Second World War and participated in polo, endurance races, fox hunting, and horse shows.

As an early proponent of the Armor Branch during the years between the world wars, Scott was the first commander of the 2nd Armored Division and the second commander of I Armored Corps. As commander of the Armor Replacement Center and Armor Center and School at Fort Knox, he directed individual and collective training for tank crewmen and units, which played a vital role in U.S. success during World War II. Scott received the Army Distinguished Service Medal in recognition of his accomplishments at Fort Knox, and retired in 1946.

== Early life ==
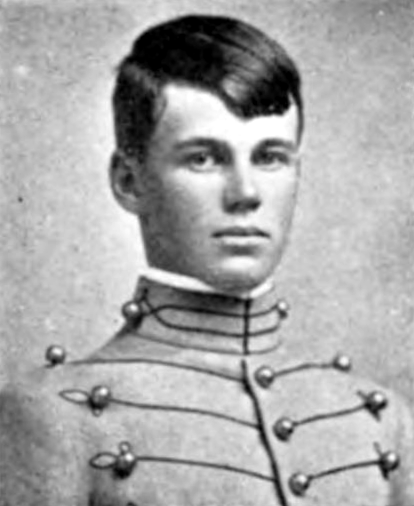
Scott's 1905 West Point Yearbook photo

Scott was born in Mount Pleasant, Monroe County, Alabama on October 22, 1883, a son of Robert Gormain Scott and Mary McClellan (English) Scott. Charles L. Scott a U.S. Congressman from California and U.S. Minister to Venezuela, was his grandfather. He was raised on a Mount Pleasant plantation near the Alabama River, and did not attend school, except for one six-month term, but was educated at home by his mother.

In 1901, U.S. Representative George W. Taylor nominated Scott for appointment to the United States Military Academy (West Point). He graduated in 1905, and was ranked 49th of 114. Scott was commissioned as a second lieutenant and assigned to the 12th Cavalry Regiment.

== Start of career ==
From September 1905 to June 1906, Scott served detached duty at the Fort Riley, Kansas Mounted Service School. He served with the 12th Cavalry at Fort Oglethorpe, Georgia from June 1906 to March 1909. He was then assigned to overseas duty in the Philippines during the Philippine–American War, and he served at Fort William McKinley from April 1909 to February 1911. After returning to the United States, he served at Fort Robinson, Nebraska from April to September 1911, and in September he was promoted to first lieutenant. He attended the Mounted Service School as a student from September 1911 to December 1912, afterwards returning to the 12th Cavalry at Fort Robinson. Scott was a noted horseman, and he was prominent in the Cavalry Branch as a participant in horse shows, polo, fox hunting, and endurance races.

In November 1915, Scott transferred to the 15th Cavalry Regiment and promoted to captain. He was again posted to the Philippines, and served there until January 1918. In January 1917 he was assigned to temporary quartermaster duty, and as the army expanded for U.S. entry into World War I, in August he was promoted to temporary major. In January 1918, he returned to the United States and was assigned to the Board for Purchasing Public Animals in Kansas City, Missouri. From April to June 1918, he commanded the Auxiliary Remount Depot at Camp Bowie, Texas, and from June to November 1918 he commanded the Northern Purchasing Zone for Public Animals. Scott was promoted to temporary lieutenant colonel in September 1918.

== Continued career ==
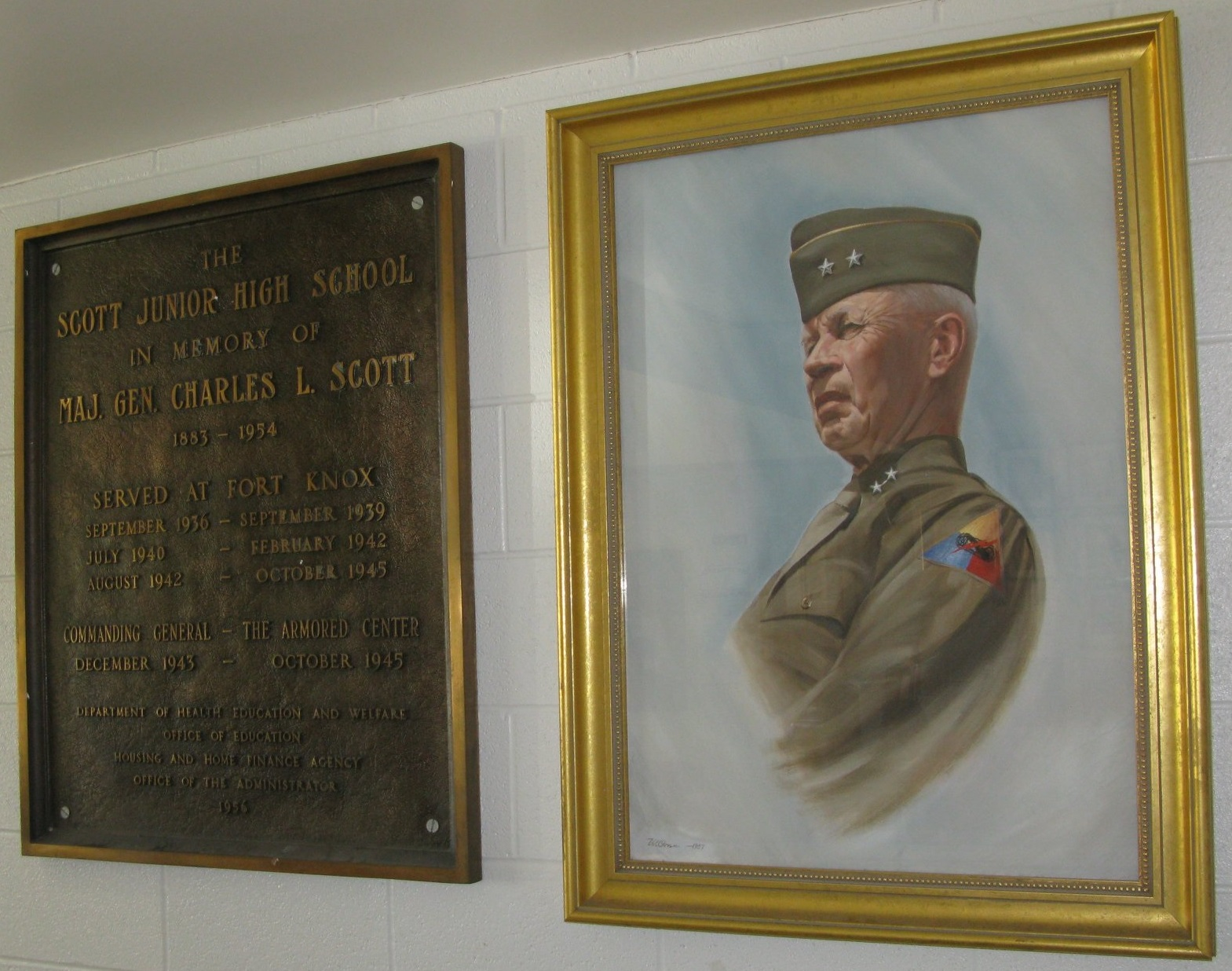
Plaque and portrait commemorating Major General Charles L. Scott. Displayed at Charles L. Scott Middle School, Fort Knox, KY

After the war, Scott served with the Remount Service until July 1920, and he returned to his permanent rank of captain in June. In July 1920 he was promoted to permanent major and assigned to the office of the Quartermaster general as head of the Remount Service's Animal Division. From April 1923 to May 1924, Scott was post quartermaster at Fort Myer, Virginia, after which he returned to the Animal Division. In August 1928, Scott began attendance at the United States Army Command and General Staff College, and he graduated in July 1929. He was promoted to permanent lieutenant colonel in May 1929.

From July 1929 to January 1930, Scott served as post quartermaster at Mitchel Field, New York. From January to June 1930, Scott was posted to Fort Riley as assistant director of instruction at the Cavalry School. In June 1930, he was assigned as the Cavalry School's director of instruction. In October 1931, he was appointed manager of the United States Equestrian Team that took part in the 1932 Summer Olympics. Scott's team received five medals, including one gold, two silver, and two bronze.

Scott was a student at the United States Army War College from September 1932 until graduating in June 1933, after which he was assigned to the Office of the Chief of Cavalry as chief of the Materiel and Equipment Section. He remained in this position until September 1936, and was promoted to colonel in August 1935. From September 1936 to October 1939, Scott commanded the 13th Cavalry Regiment at Fort Knox, and was responsible for its organization and training as it converted from horses to motorized vehicles. In October 1939, Scott was assigned as assistant chief of staff for plans, operations, and training (G-3) at Headquarters, First Corps Area, which was located at South Boston Army Base, Massachusetts. He served in this position until June 1940, and was promoted to brigadier general in May.

== Later career ==
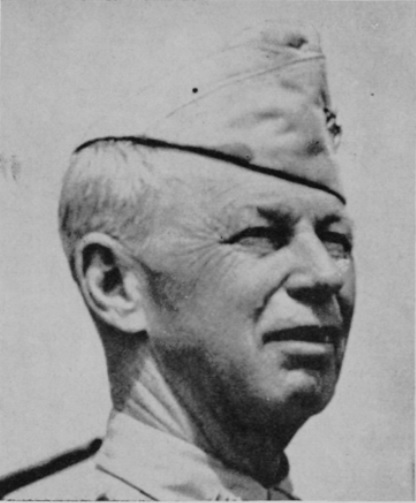
Scott in service uniform and garrison cap during World War II

Convinced by the results of the May 1940 Third United States Army maneuvers that the United States would need to field an armored force for World War II, tank and Cavalry officers including Scott, Bruce Magruder, George S. Patton, and Adna R. Chaffee Jr. agreed to recommend its creation to George Marshall, the Chief of Staff of the United States Army. Marshall concurred, and the Army organized and fielded the I Armored Corps. Chaffee was assigned as corps commander, with Magruder assigned in July 1940 as commander of the 1st Armored Division at Fort Knox and Scott assigned to command the 2nd Armored Division at Fort Benning.

Scott led the 2nd Armored Division during its initial manning, equipping, and training and was promoted to major general in October. In November 1940 he was assigned to command I Armored Corps at Fort Knox because of Chaffee's extended illness. He continued to serve as commander until December 1941, and led the unit during major events including the Carolina Maneuvers. During his command, Scott worked to demonstrate to senior army leaders the value of tank formations for shock and firepower, and attempted to persuade them to abandon the older doctrine of using tanks in small detachments for Infantry support.

From January to July 1942, Scott served in Cairo, Egypt as senior U.S. military attaché and senior U.S. military observer with the British Eighth Army during the Western Desert campaign. From August 1942 to December 1943, Scott commanded the Armor Replacement Center at Fort Knox. He was then appointed to command the U.S. Army Armor Center and School. He remained in command until retiring in February 1946. Scott's wartime service was recognized with award of the Army Distinguished Service Medal. In addition he received the Order of the British Empire (honorary Knight Commander) from the United Kingdom and the Order of Military Merit from Brazil.

== Retirement and death ==
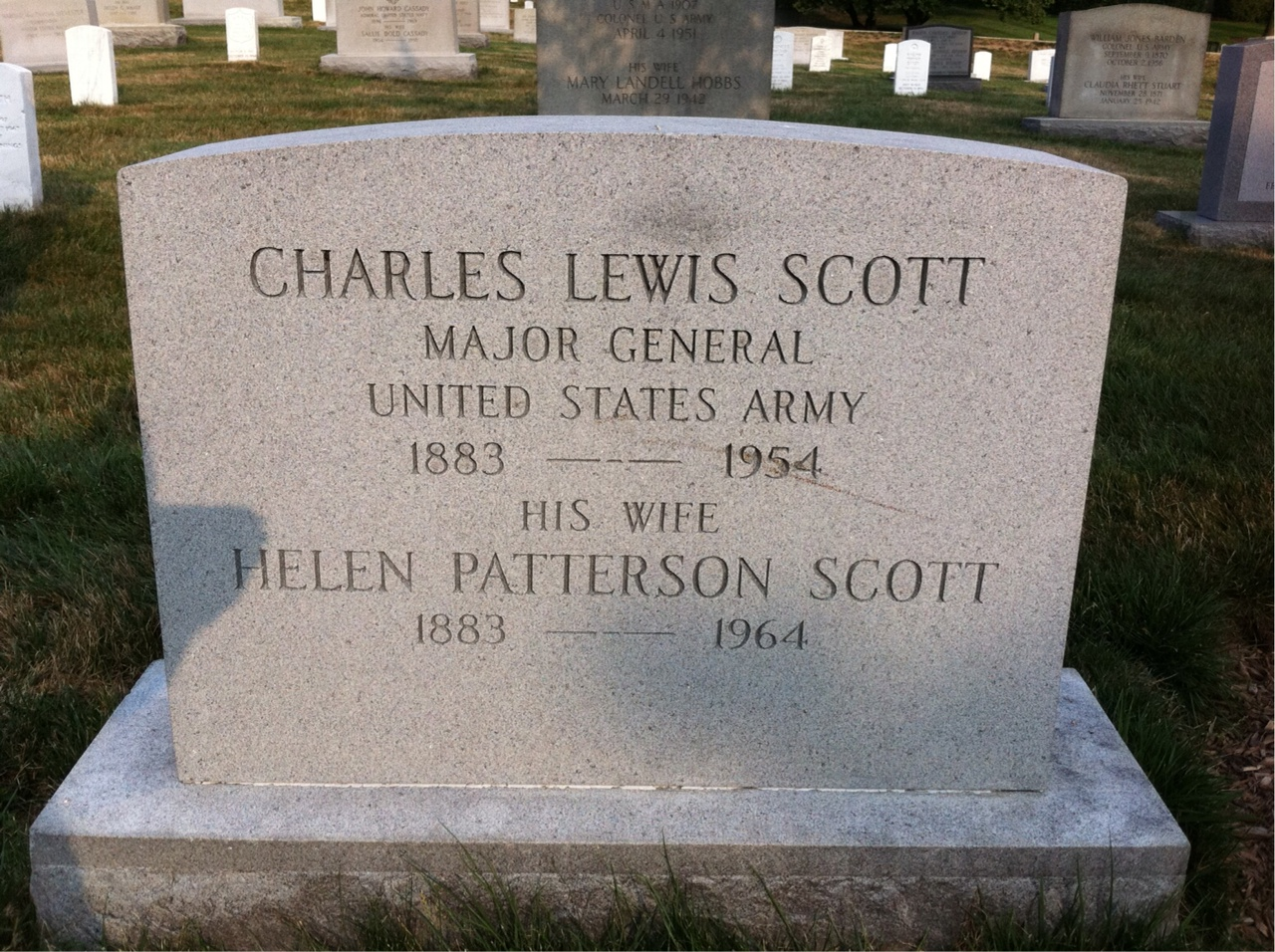
Scott's grave marker at Arlington national Cemetery

In retirement, Scott was a resident of Washington, D.C. He died at Walter Reed Army Medical Center on November 27, 1954. Scott's funeral took place at the Fort Myer chapel, and he was buried at Arlington National Cemetery.

== Family ==
In March 1912, Scott married Helen Jeanette Patterson (1883–1964). They were the parents of a son, Robert Charles Lewis Scott (1913–2003). Robert C. L. Scott was an army veteran of World War II, and a career history professor, department chair, and dean at Williams College.
