= Adna R. Chaffee Jr. =

United States Army general (1884–1941)

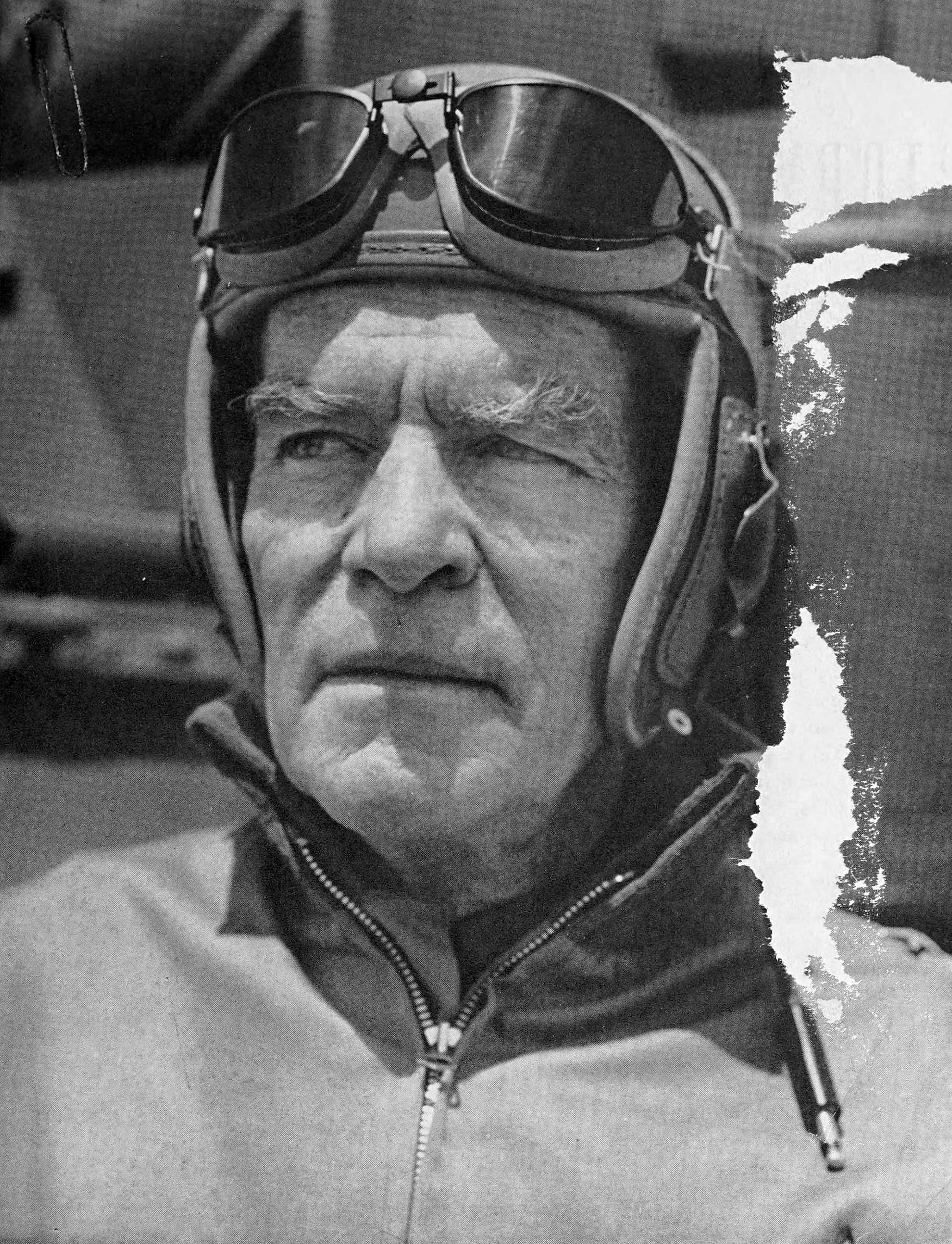
- Chaffee c. 1941
- Born: September 23, 1884; Junction City, Kansas, U.S.
- Died: August 22, 1941 (aged 56); Boston, Massachusetts, U.S.
- Burial place: Arlington National Cemetery
- Relatives: Lieutenant general Adna Chaffee (father)
- Military career
- Allegiance: United States
- Branch: United States Army
- Service years: 1906–1941
- Rank: Major general
- Commands: 7th Cavalry Brigade; I Armored Corps
- Conflicts: World War I: Saint-Mihiel offensive; Meuse-Argonne offensive
- Awards: Distinguished Service Medal (2)

Adna Romanza Chaffee Jr. (September 23, 1884 – August 22, 1941) was an officer in the United States Army, called the "Father of the Armored Force" for his role in developing the U.S. Army's tank forces.

== Early life and education ==
Chaffee was born in Junction City, Kansas, on September 23, 1884, to his father, Lieutenant General Adna R. Chaffee, and mother, Annie Francis Rockwell. He was commissioned as a lieutenant of Cavalry in 1906 following his graduation from the United States Military Academy. He was 31st out of 78 pupils in his class. Chaffee learned to ride on horseback from a young age, and would later receive recognition as "the Army's finest horseman".

Upon his father's death in 1914, he became an Hereditary First Class Companion of the Military Order of the Loyal Legion of the United States.

== Career ==
From 1914 to 1915, Chaffee was posted with the 7th Cavalry in the Philippines, and from 1916 to 1917, Chaffee was assigned to West Point as the senior cavalry instructor in the Tactical Department. When America entered World War I in April 1917, Chaffee was temporarily promoted to major and assigned as the adjutant for the 81st Division as it organized at Camp Jackson, South Carolina. During the war, Chaffee served as an Assistant G3 Operations officer in the US IV Corps, and later returned to the 81st Division as the G3 during the St. Mihiel and Meuse-Argonne offensives. Promoted to the temporary rank of colonel, he became the G3, III Corps at the end of the war, and remained with the corps for occupation duty in 1919.

Following the war, he returned to his Regular Army rank of captain of cavalry and became an instructor at the General Staff School and the Army School of the Line at Fort Leavenworth. During the 1920s, he helped develop the armor concepts and doctrine of the future. He predicted in 1927 that mechanized armies would dominate the next war and helped the first effort to develop a U.S. Army armored force. In 1931, newly promoted Lieutenant Colonel Chaffee was assigned as the executive officer of the embryonic 1st Cavalry Division, where he continued to develop and experiment with armored forces and became the leading American advocate of mechanized warfare. From 1934 to 1938, Chaffee was posted to the War Department as the Chief of the Budget and Legislative Planning Branch. Chaffee then returned to the 1st Cavalry Division at Fort Knox, where he was advanced to brigadier general and given command of the 7th Mechanized Brigade. Chaffee led the unit through the Plattsburg and Louisiana Maneuvers of 1939–1940, where he helped develop Army doctrine for armored and mechanized formations.

In June 1940, Chaffee was appointed the commander of the Armored Force, and given responsibility for integrating all branches of the Army into mechanized warfare. He played a major role in the development and fielding of new armored and mechanized infantry divisions for World War II. Chaffee was promoted to major general in October 1940, and given command of the I Armored Corps.

When Chaffee became ill with cancer he was succeeded as corps commander by Charles L. Scott. Chaffee died in Boston on August 22, 1941. He was buried next to his father in Section 3 of Arlington National Cemetery.

== Legacy ==
- The M24 Chaffee light tank is named after him.
- Fort Chaffee, near Fort Smith, Arkansas, is named in his honor.

Military offices
Preceded by None.	Chief of the Armored Force; 1940 – August 1, 1941	Succeeded by Jacob L. Devers
