= Frederick Appleton Smith =

United States Army general (1849–1922)

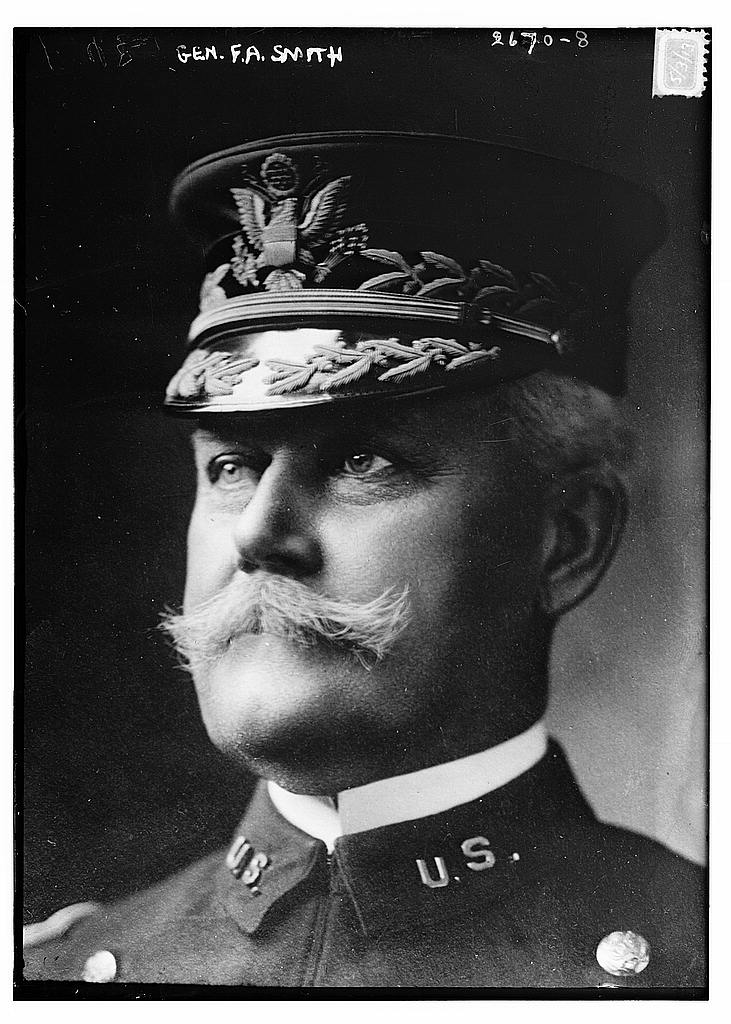
- Frederick A. Smith circa 1913
- Born: May 15, 1849; Craigville, New York, U.S.
- Died: February 4, 1922 (aged 72); New York City, U.S.
- Military career
- Allegiance: United States of America
- Branch: United States Army
- Service years: 1873–1913
- Rank: Brigadier general
- Conflicts: Indian Wars: Nez Perce War

Frederick Appleton Smith (May 15, 1849 – February 4, 1922) was an American brigadier general.

== Biography ==
He was born in New York on May 15, 1849. He entered the United States Military Academy on July 1, 1869, and graduated in 1873. He then served in the Nez Perce War. He retired on May 15, 1913. On January 28, 1915, he remarried at age 64, a widow, Mrs. Hevenor, the former Emma Mandeville.

He died on February 4, 1922, and is buried in Cedar Hill Cemetery and Mausoleum, Newburgh, New York.

== Publications ==
- Personal experiences and observations during campaign in Cuba (1899)
- Infantry drill regulations, United States Army (1904)
