= Fort Mackenzie =

- U.S. National Register of Historic Places
- U.S. Historic district
- Location within Wyoming
- Nearest city: Sheridan, Wyoming
- Coordinates: 44°49′39″N 106°58′55″W
- Area: 295.8 acres (119.7 ha)
- Built: 1922
- Architectural style: Neoclassical Revival
- NRHP reference No.: 81000612
- Added to NRHP: June 18, 1981

Fort Mackenzie is a former U.S. Army post in Sheridan, Wyoming, now used by the U.S. Veterans Administration as the Sheridan Veterans Administration Medical Center.

== History ==
Fort Mackenzie was established in Sheridan in 1898 as a U.S. Army outpost in northern Wyoming. It was named for Colonel Ranald S. Mackenzie (1840 – 1889), a veteran of the Powder River Expedition who defeated Cheyenne Chief Dull Knife near the Big Horn Mountains in the Dull Knife Fight of 1876. Established 24 years after the Battle of Little Bighorn and after nearby military posts in Montana had been abandoned, the fort was regarded as a pork-barrel project instigated by Wyoming's Congressional delegation following Wyoming statehood in 1890, rather than as a project driven by military requirements. The first garrison arrived in June 1899, with one officer and 20 enlisted personnel. By 1903 more troops had arrived, including two "colored" units. The peak of the establishment was reached in 1911 with 601 men. The post rapidly declined after that when World War I created higher priorities for manpower and garrisons, and the post was abandoned on November 3, 1918. The original military post included 6,280 acres (2,540 ha) of land.

The site was initially transferred to the Public Health Service in 1921. From 1922 the site was used as a veterans hospital, with an initial capacity of 125 beds. At its peak in the late 1940s it had 900 beds, specializing in neuropsychiatric conditions. In the late 1970s the hospital's capacity was 364 beds, with a staff of 505. In 2014 the facility provided 208 beds with outpatient services for 12,500 veterans.

== Description ==
There are 48 structures listed as contributions to the Fort Mackenzie National Register of Historic Places district. The campus represents a uniform community of red brick hospital buildings, residences and supporting with simplified neoclassical detailing. The hospital reservation comprises 272 acres (110 ha) with about 78 buildings, most of which were built for the military garrison or for the establishment of the hospital. Many of the remaining buildings were built from the 1930s in a compatible style. The earlier buildings are arranged in two rows and along a curved avenue. The ensemble presents a homogeneous complex comparable to those of Fort Yellowstone or the original army post at Francis E. Warren Air Force Base.

Fort Mackenzie was placed on the National Register of Historic Places on June 18, 1981.
