= Effects of the 1919 Florida Keys hurricane in Texas =

1919 Florida Keys hurricane
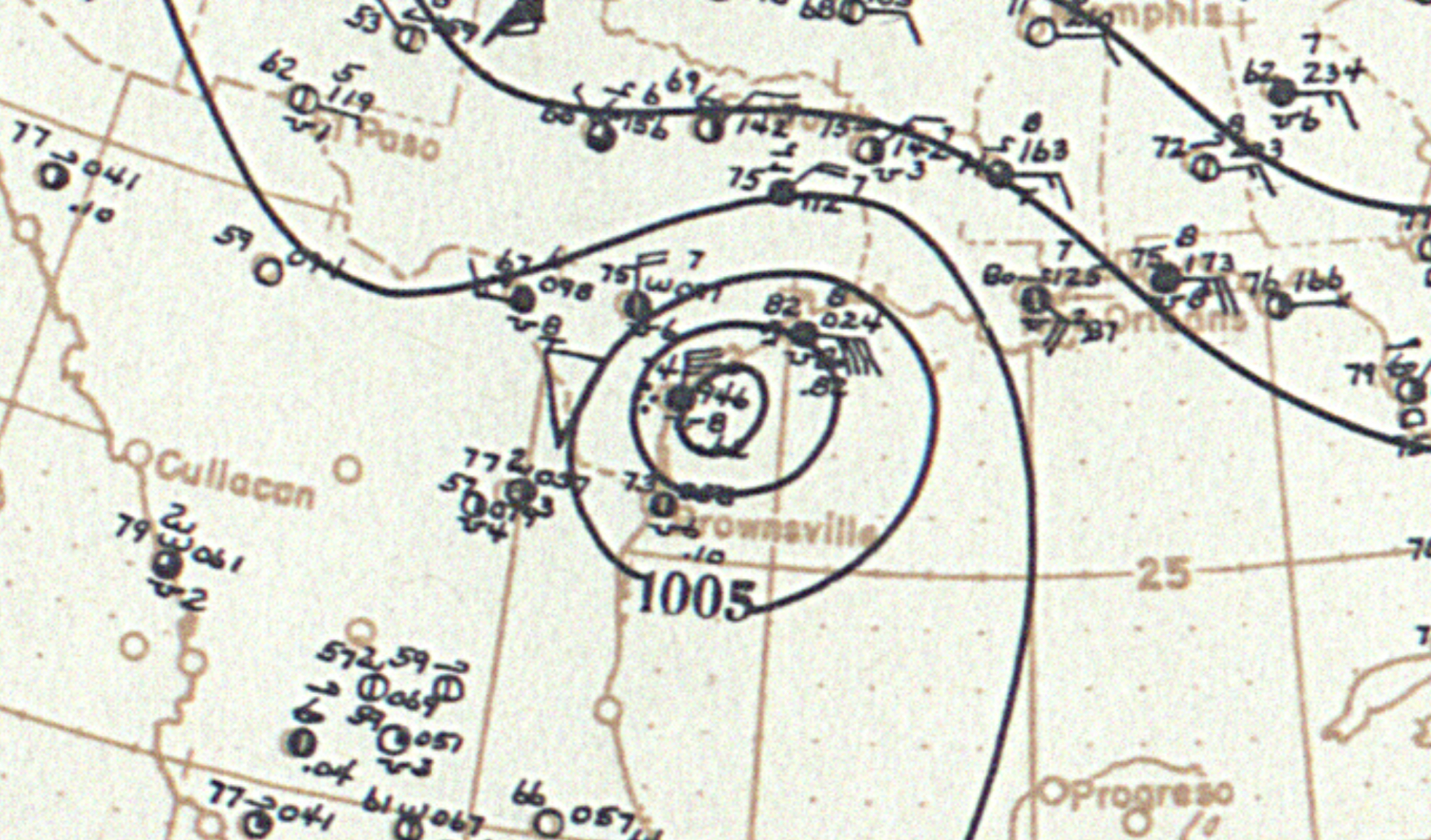
- Surface weather analysis of the hurricane striking the Texas Coastal Bend on September 14

Category 3 major hurricane
- 1-minute sustained (SSHWS/NWS)
- Highest winds: 115 mph (185 km/h)
- Lowest pressure: 950 mbar (hPa); 28.05 inHg

Overall effects
- Fatalities: 284 (official toll), up to 1,000 (estimated)
- Damage: ≥$20.3 million (1919 USD)
- Areas affected: Southeast Texas, Texas Coastal Bend (especially Corpus Christi), South Texas
- Part of the 1919 Atlantic hurricane season

The effects of the 1919 Florida Keys hurricane in Texas were the deadliest of any tropical cyclone in the Texas Coastal Bend, killing at least 284 people. The hurricane produced a widespread swath of devastation across the region, exacerbated by the large extent of its winds. The city of Corpus Christi bore the brunt of the hurricane's impacts, contributing to the largest portion of the damage toll in Texas; nearly all of the confirmed fatalities were residents of the city. The storm originated from the Leeward Islands early in September 1919 and took a generally west-northwestward course, devastating the Florida Keys en route to the Gulf of Mexico. On the afternoon of September 14, the center of the hurricane made landfall upon the Texas coast at Baffin Bay. The storm's winds were estimated at 115 mph (185 km/h) at landfall, making it a Category 3 hurricane on the Saffir–Simpson hurricane wind scale. After slowly moving ashore, it weakened and straddled the Rio Grande before dissipating on September 16 over West Texas.

== Background ==
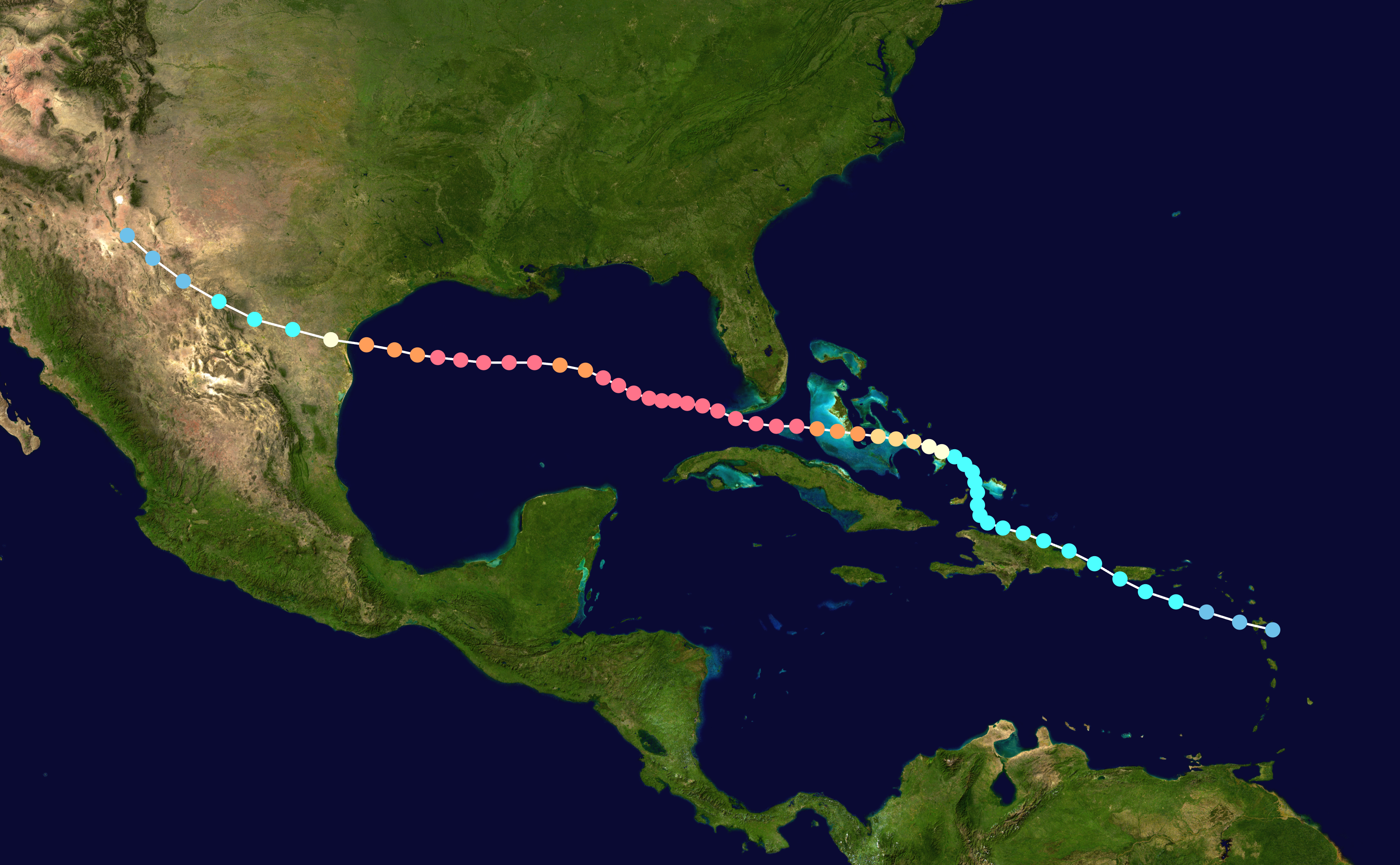
Map plotting the storm's track and intensity, according to the Saffir–Simpson scale Map key Saffir–Simpson scale Tropical depression (≤38 mph, ≤62 km/h) Tropical storm (39–73 mph, 63–118 km/h) Category 1 (74–95 mph, 119–153 km/h) Category 2 (96–110 mph, 154–177 km/h) Category 3 (111–129 mph, 178–208 km/h) Category 4 (130–156 mph, 209–251 km/h) Category 5 (≥157 mph, ≥252 km/h) Unknown Storm type Tropical cyclone Subtropical cyclone Extratropical cyclone, remnant low, tropical disturbance, or monsoon depression

Between its establishment in 1839 and the hurricane of 1919, the city of Corpus Christi, Texas, had developed into a major regional port, bolstered heavily during the Gilded Age by the connection of a railway to the city following investments by wealthy South Texas businessmen Richard King and Mifflin Kenedy. There were over 200 buildings between Corpus Christi Bay and Nueces Bay by 1919, with a burgeoning network of railways linking the city to inland locales. Among Texas ports, Corpus Christi trailed only Galveston by total commercial volume; the Corpus Christi Caller, a Corpus Christi newspaper, considered Galveston a rival port city and often derided it in print. In the four years prior to 1919, two Category 4 hurricanes threatened Corpus Christi, but struck elsewhere along the Texas coast; the first made landfall near Galveston in August 1915 while the second moved ashore near Baffin Bay in August 1916. In response to these two near-misses, the Caller published a headline stating that "[Corpus Christi] is Practically Storm Proof." While a seawall was erected in Galveston following a devastating hurricane in 1900, civic leaders did not believe such a structure was necessary for Corpus Christi; the Caller surmised in a July 1901 article that "such a tidal wave and destruction of life and property as occurred at Galveston September 8, 1900, is an utter impossibility." Some residents of the city believed that the outlying barrier islands sufficiently protected the city from storm surge. George Reeder, the bureau chief of the Corpus Christi division of the United States Weather Bureau, penned an article in the Caller in 1900, testifying to the immunity of the city from tropical storms by virtue of Corpus Christi's location, topography, and barrier islands. Brochures from the Texas Mexican Railway described Corpus Christi as "the only coast city of the Gulf of Mexico, between Veracruz and Florida, that is absolutely secure against inundation." Other publications also asserted Corpus Christi's invulnerability using similar arguments.

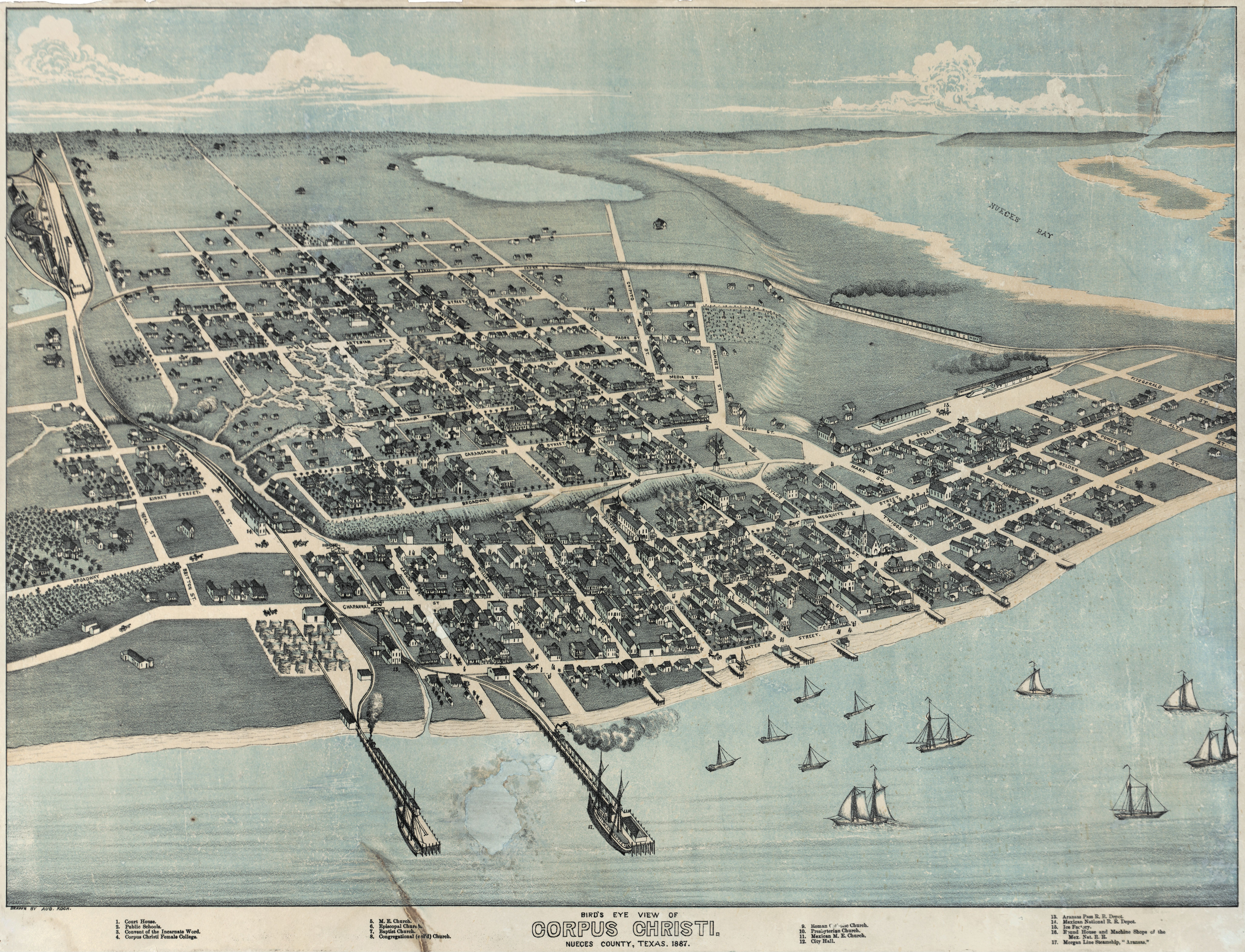
Map of Corpus Christi in 1887

One of the highest priorities of the Corpus Christi government in the years leading up to the 1919 hurricane was to establish a deep-water port; maritime commerce had been hamstrung by the inability of large ships to enter the Corpus Christi Bay. U.S. Representative John Nance Garner brought forth a proposal to the Army Corps of Engineers to survey and dredge a channel from Aransas Pass to Corpus Christi's wharves. A bayfront improvement plan was developed to meet government mandates for protection of the city's populace in order to proceed with the deep-water port's development, including a possible seawall. However, the high costs involved and political divisions prevented the project from proceeding promptly; by August 1919, only property valuation of lands near the proposed seawall had been conducted.

The 1919 hurricane began as a tropical depression over the Leeward Islands on September 2, 1919. It traveled on a west-northwestward path, crossing the Mona Passage as a tropical storm before intensifying into a hurricane. The U.S. Weather Bureau did not anticipate its eventual track into the Gulf of Mexico. However, the Azores High, a steering influence on tropical cyclones, was unusually expansive in the summer of 1919. This caused the hurricane to track west across the Bahamas, towards the Florida Straits, and eventually into the Gulf of Mexico. It struck the Dry Tortugas of Florida on September 10 with maximum sustained winds of 150 mph (240 km/h), ranking it as a Category 4 hurricane on the modern-day Saffir–Simpson scale. At Key West, Florida, the storm likely damaged all structures; property loss there was estimated at $2 million. The storm was particularly impactful at sea: the Spanish steamship Valbanera, with 488 passengers and crew, and the Ward Line steamship Corydon, with 37 crew, sank in the hurricane's wrath. In total, the storm sank at least 10 large ships and 25 smaller vessels between the Bahamas and Texas. With the storm bearing down on South Florida, Major Allen Buell of the Weather Bureau predicted that San Antonio, Texas, would not experience any inclement effects.

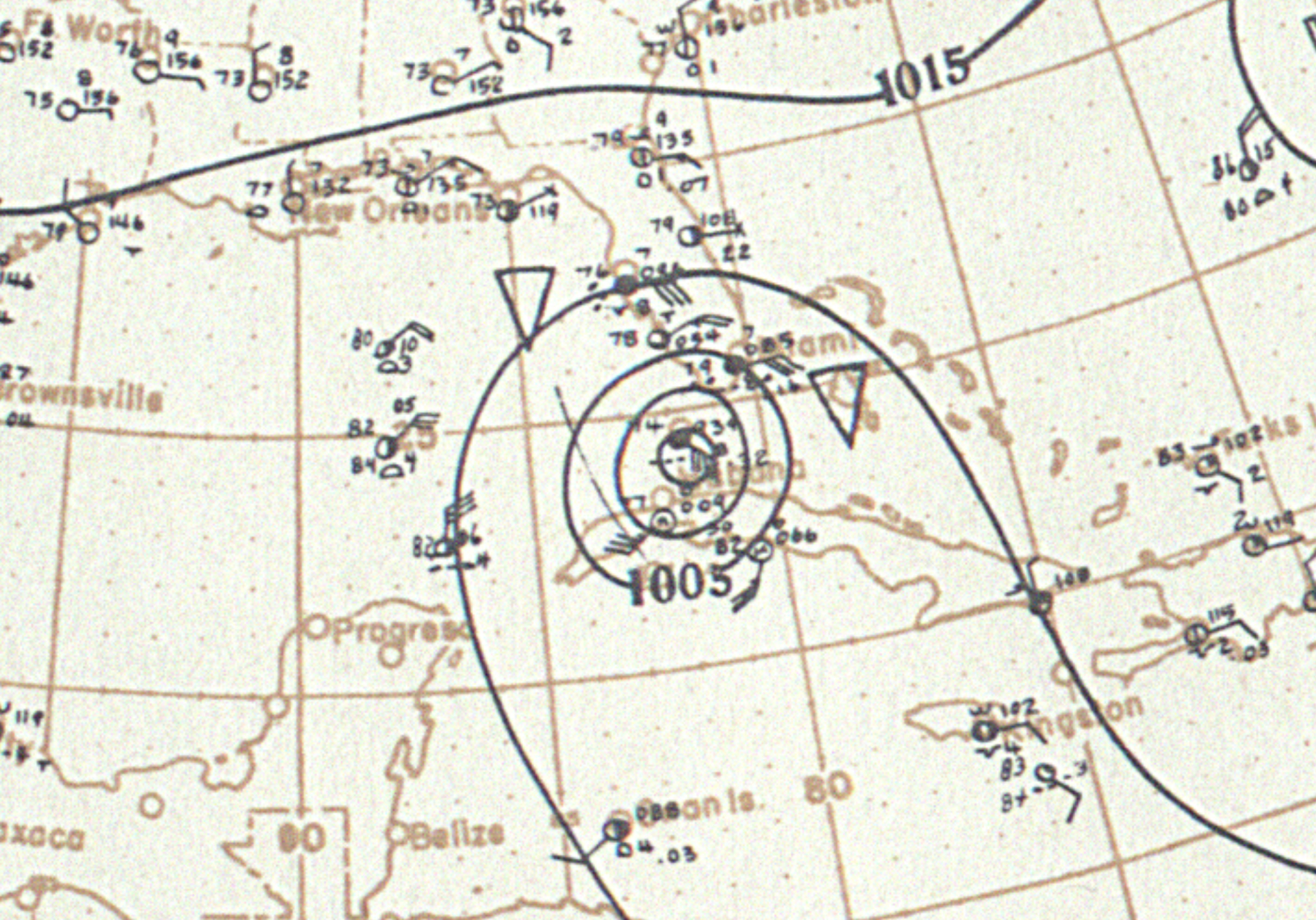
Surface weather analysis of the hurricane while it was within the Florida Straits on September 10

Due to a lack of weather observations over the Gulf of Mexico, the Weather Bureau had difficulty locating and forecasting the hurricane as it approached Texas. H. C. Frankenfield, a supervising forecaster with the bureau, would later write in the Monthly Weather Review that it was "absolutely impossible to forecast the intensity and progress of the storm, and the coast stations, far from the center of the storm, afforded but meager information." Bulletins from the regional Weather Bureau center in New Orleans, Louisiana, conveyed these uncertainties as the hurricane traversed the gulf. Storm warnings were issued for the coast of East Texas between Port Arthur and Corpus Christi by the agency on September 11, but were discontinued after the Weather Bureau erroneously suspected that the storm made landfall in Louisiana and Mississippi. Acknowledging that knowledge of the storm's location was "conjectural", the Weather Bureau transmitted the following message to telegraph offices along the coast:

Regret that no radio reports were received from Gulf of Mexico during the entire day. Increasing northeast winds at mouth of Mississippi River indicate that storm is not far to southward of that locality, and we can only repeat previous messages urging great caution until further advices [on the morning of September 13]. Good night.

— Message sent from the Weather Bureau at 11:30 p.m. CT on September 12

Despite showers reaching the Texas Coastal Bend on September 12, Corpus Christi officials ordered the lowering of storm warning flags along the city's beaches and wharves the following day. With the storm appearing to have passed harmlessly, residents were outdoors enjoying the cool northerly winds afforded by the nearby hurricane. At Galveston, the night sky was clear and tides were normal, albeit suffused with heavy surf. The air pressure at Galveston and Port Arthur rose on September 12; this temporary rise was later attributed to an area of high pressure moving southeast across the region. The next day, the Weather Bureau stated that the hurricane would be smaller and weaker than the 1916 Texas hurricane, with winds forecast to reach 40 mph (64 km/h). However, on September 13 the northerly winds in Corpus Christi became increasingly violent and coastal swells became indicative of an approaching storm surge. Observations taken along the Texas coast on the afternoon of September 13 documented a gradual decrease in air pressure, with Galveston also reporting an increase in ocean swells. The Houston Weather Bureau office relayed a message to Corpus Christi locating the storm south of Galveston, Texas, and urging the Corpus Christi Weather Bureau to monitor the air pressure and to "take all possible precautions against rising winds and higher tides" if the pressure were to fall. Hurricane warnings were reinstated on September 14 as the storm's effects continued to escalate along the Texas coast. The hurricane made landfall 25 mi (40 km) south of Corpus Christi that afternoon with sustained winds of 115 mph (185 km/h) and an air pressure of 950 mbar (hPa; 28.05 inHg).

=== Preparations ===
Falling pressures in Houston—indicative of the storm's proximity—prompted an evacuation of railroad cars from Galveston Island to the mainland via the use of switch engines on September 12. These cars carried some 3 million bushels of grain along with other perishable cargo. Ships at the Port of Galveston remained at port with the storm looming to the east. Galveston residents concurrently took refuge at hotels in Houston, with interurban service allotting additional cars hourly to facilitate their evacuation. At 10:30 a.m. CDT on September 14, Charles Heckathorn, a meteorologist for Corpus Christi's Weather Bureau office, issued a warning to "direct people in exposed places to seek places of safety." City police dispatched messengers to disseminate this alert for residents north of Corpus Christi. However, not every resident received warning; communications to Incarnate Word were disrupted before warnings could be delivered. People began to flee their homes in earnest as the sea began to rise and inundate dry ground ahead of the hurricane's arrival.

== Impact ==
The 1919 hurricane caused at least $20 million in damage and 284 deaths in Texas. The official death total only incorporated bodies that could be identified; many of those who perished in Nueces Bay were covered in crude oil following breaches of oil tanks at Port Aransas and could not be identified. According to the National Weather Service office in Corpus Christi, as many as 600–1000 people may have been killed. A relief committee organized in Corpus Christi after the storm reported over 400 fatalities and over 100 missing. However, the Caller downplayed the city's death toll to bolster the city's appeal for the development of a deep-water port. The storm produced an extended swath of rainfall over much of South and West Texas. Rainfall totals of at least 3 in (76 mm) spanned westward towards the Pecos River valley into Hudspeth County and northward into the Texas Panhandle towards the Oklahoma border. Between September 14–16, several cities set 24-hour rainfall records; single-day totals reached as high as 12 in (300 mm) in George West on September 15. Throughout the state in September 1919, 80 weather stations recorded a 24-hour period with more than 2.5 in (64 mm) of rain.

=== Southeast Texas ===
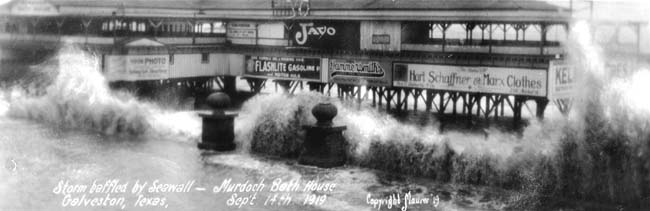
Waves crashing along the seawall in Galveston

The hurricane caused approximately $272,000 in damage within the Galveston district of the U.S. Weather Bureau. Along the Texas coast from Matagorda Bay to the Texas border with Louisiana, storm surge heights ranged from 4 ft (1.2 m) at Orange to 13 ft (4.0 m) at Port O'Connor, where some homes were wrecked by heavy seas; damage in Port O'Connor and Seadrift amounted to $40,000. Sabine Pass along the Louisiana border experienced an 8 ft (2.4 m) surge. "A few buildings" were destroyed in Seabrook along the coast of Galveston Bay, with total property damage valued at $2,000. A bulkhead in Trinity Bay off Anahuac was damaged, but Anahuac itself suffered little damage from a 6-foot (1.8 m) storm tide due to its elevated position relative to the bay. Washouts occurred on segments of the Gulf and Interstate Railroad near Caplen, causing an estimated $20,000 in damage.

Owing to the large size of the storm, an 8.8-foot-storm-surge (2.7 m) was measured in Galveston while the hurricane was centered south of New Orleans, Louisiana. The surge inundated low-lying areas of Galveston as well as the city's business district. At the height of the tidal increase, waters 4–5 ft (1.2–1.5 m) deep covered parts of the city south of Avenues F and G; the depth of inundation was 2–3 ft (0.61–0.91 m) north of those roads. Rough surf destroyed the East End Fishing Pier and damaged a concrete embankment at 35th Street and Seawall Boulevard. Approximately 1,700 ft (520 m) of railroad along the Galveston Causeway was endangered by the washout of sand supporting the railroad; railroad and interurban service was disrupted by this damage before resuming at 5 p.m. on September 15. Two people were killed near Galveston by the storm surge; these were the only fatalities associated with the hurricane in the Galveston area. Most cattle in the city had been brought to safety before the storm, mitigating cattle losses aside from the loss of some hogs and poultry. Gusts from the storm peaked at 60 mph (97 km/h) in Galveston on the morning of September 14, with an accompanying rainfall total of 2.35 in (60 mm). In total, property damage in Galveston was estimated at $60,000 by the Weather Bureau.

=== Texas Coastal Bend ===
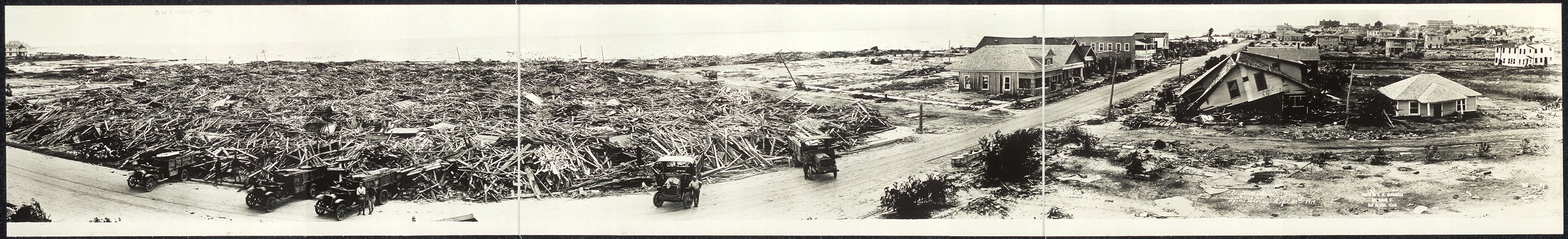
Damage caused by the storm in Corpus Christi

The severity of the hurricane's impacts increased southward from Galveston. Along the Matagorda Peninsula, the storm surge was 10 ft (3.0 m) high, flooding the island and damaging agriculture. The waves and 11.1-foot-storm surge (3.4 m) dislodged timbers from docks at Port Aransas, forcing them inland where they destroyed buildings. Five oil tanks were also destroyed, and only a school building remained standing amid the devastation in Port Aransas. The steamship Median was beached onto the port's docks, while the tankers Juanita and Susquehannah were grounded well-inland. Five people drowned at Port Aransas while attempting to evacuate on a lifeboat; another two deaths were recorded at Aransas Pass. Small boats and wharves were wrought "considerable damage" at Matagorda, Palacios, and Port Lavaca; property damage in those communities totaled $140,000. Bathhouses and pavilions on the campgrounds of the Baptist Young Peoples Union in Palacios were destroyed.

==== Corpus Christi ====
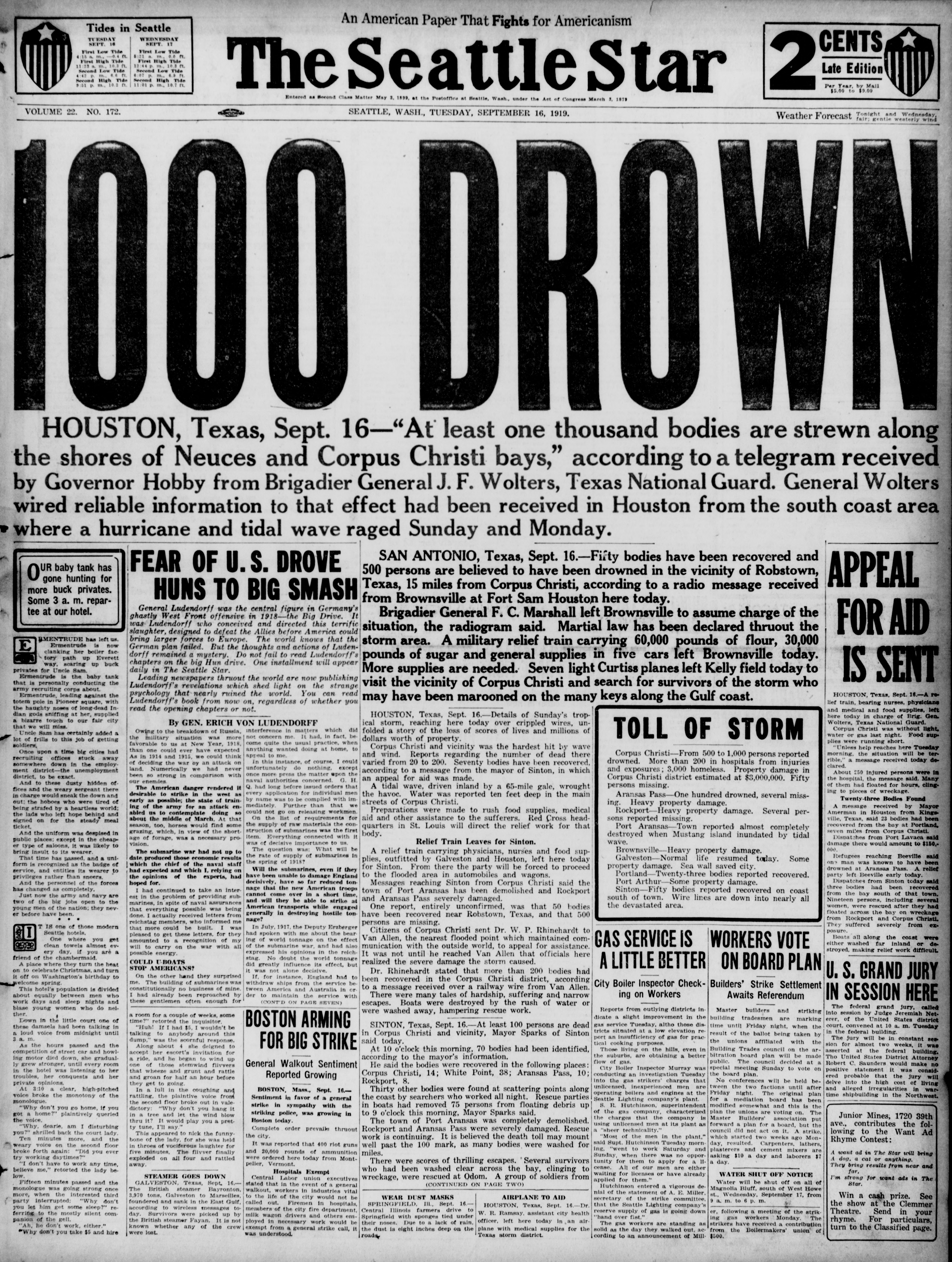
Front page of The Seattle Star reporting on the devastation two days after the hurricane

The hurricane exacted its greatest toll on Corpus Christi and the city's immediate vicinity. Nearly all of the 284 verified fatalities were residents of Corpus Christi; 57 bodies were recovered in the city proper while 121 were found at nearby White Point, the highest death toll of any locality from the hurricane. The Houston Post reported a "conservative estimate" of $20 million for the total monetary loss from Corpus Christi, approximated by "prominent business men and other trained observers". Squalls from the hurricane began to impact the city on September 12, and the Gulf waters continued to rise until the storm passed on September 14. Corpus Christi was positioned within the right-front quadrant of the hurricane as it made landfall, which typically contains the storm's strongest winds and highest storm surge. Winds ranging between 70–110 mph (110–180 km/h) buffeted the city for roughly 17 hours between September 14–15, accompanied by a 16-foot (4.9 m) storm surge—the highest on record in Corpus Christi's history. The surge submerged some areas under 15 ft (4.6 m) of water.

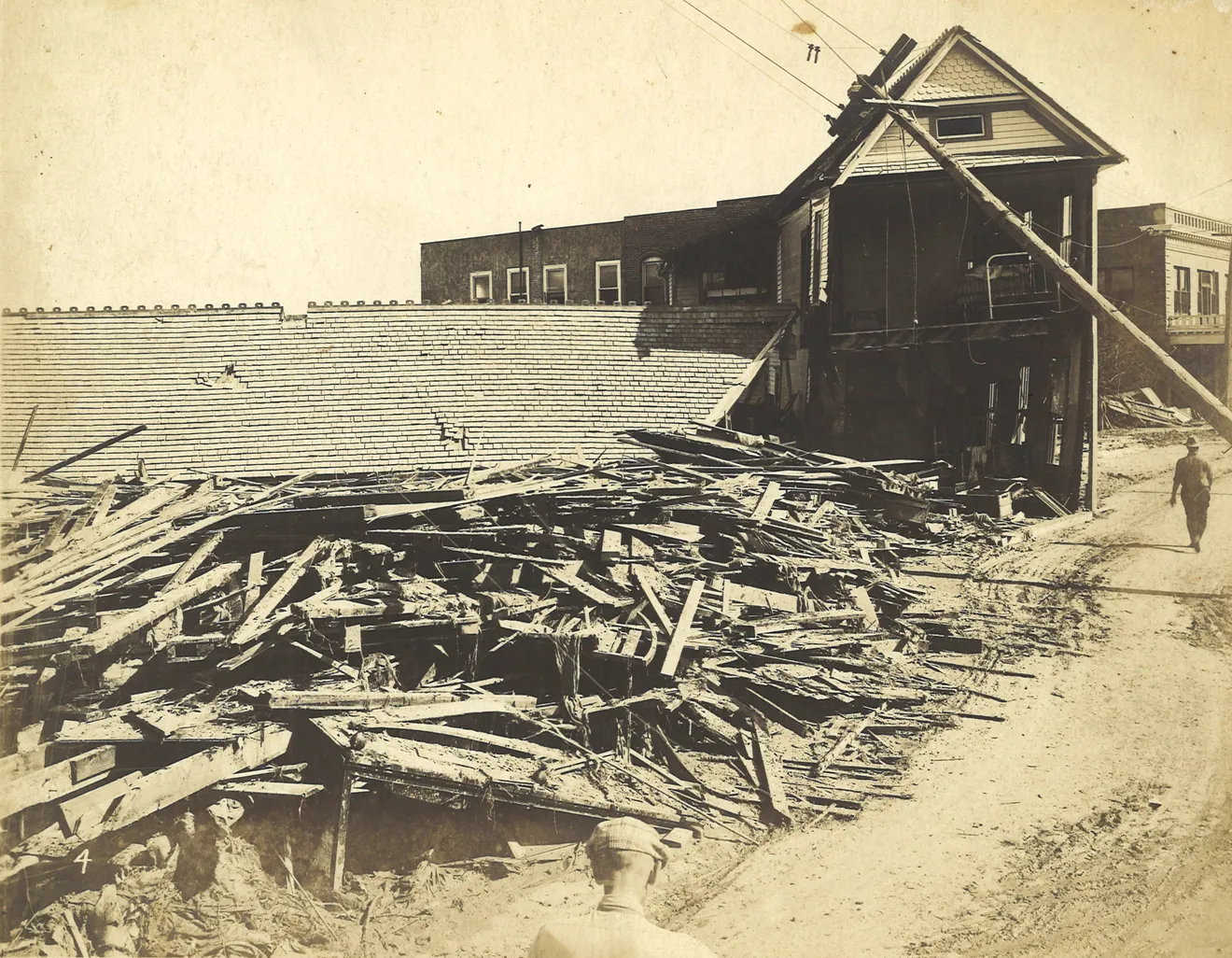
Debris in front of the Plaza Hotel on Chaparral Street in Corpus Christi after the storm

The hurricane destroyed over 900 buildings in and around Corpus Christi. The downtown area and North Beach were devastated. All city businesses below the promontory were impacted, with some destroyed. Along the city's beaches, 900 homes across 23 blocks between Star Street and Dan Reid Street disintegrated, leaving little trace of their former presence aside from sporadic debris. Few structures remained intact on North Beach, with only three structures partially surviving; among these was the Spohn Sanitarium, where four people were killed. Homes were razed along the beach, with their residents carried by the storm surge into Nueces Bay; many drowned in the bay while others survived as the waves carried them to White Point.

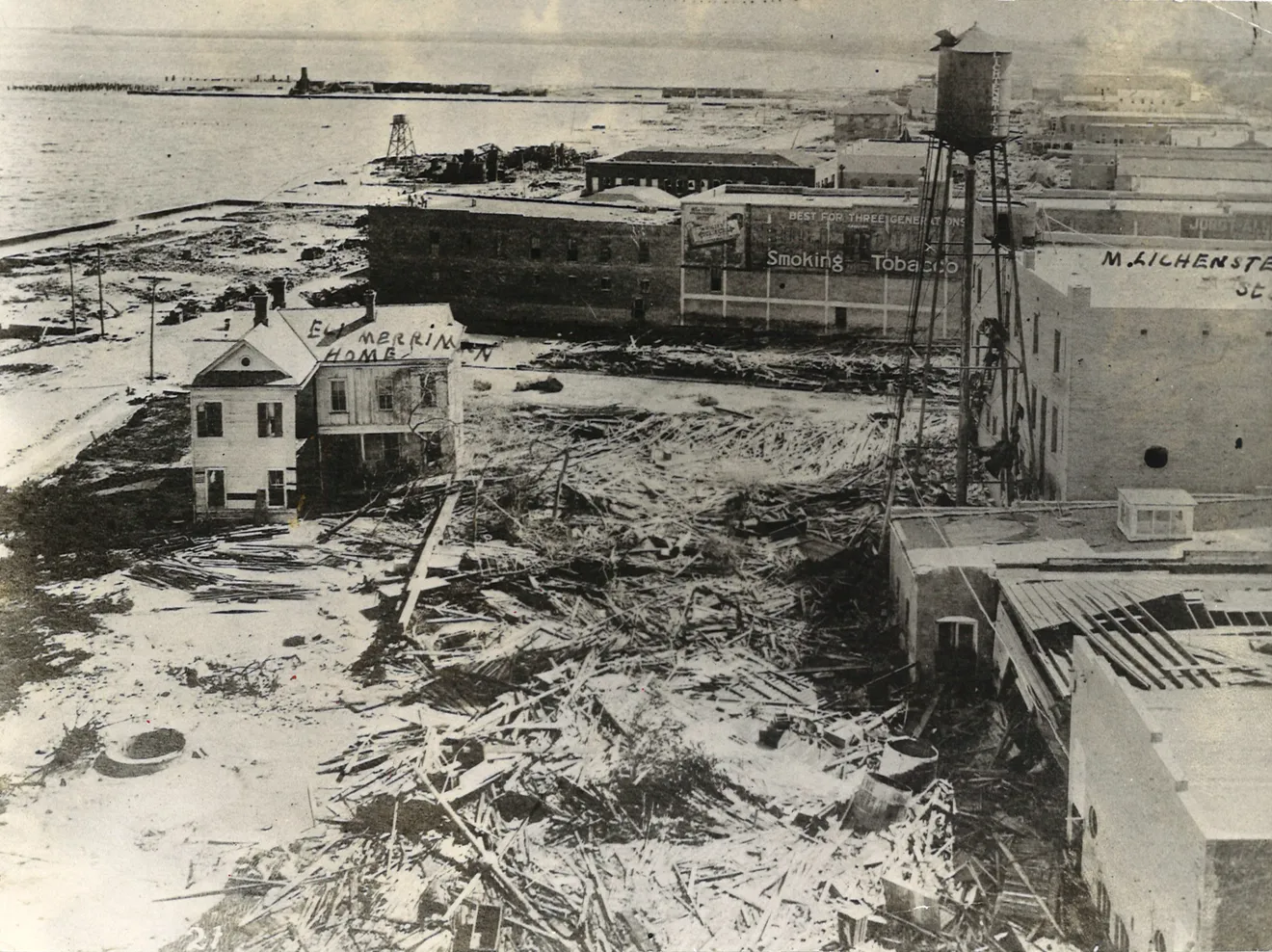
Devastation at Water Street in Corpus Christi after the hurricane

Beach erosion carved a new coastline 50–200 ft (15–61 m) inland between North Beach and Caroll Street. Bluffs along Corpus Christi Bay near Corpus Christi and Portland recessed as far as 100 ft (30 m). Catastrophic damage occurred in downtown Corpus Christi where flooding reached a maximum depth of 11.5 ft (3.5 m). Industrial and public plants along a six-block stretch of the downtown waterfront were destroyed. Beyond the immediate waterfront, the Houston Post reported that "every commercial establishment's first floor was wrecked, and in some cases the entire building rendered useless, over a corresponding area two blocks wide." Floodwaters maintained a depth of 8–9 ft (2.4–2.7 m) in some of the buildings that remained standing. The surge deposited debris en masse in the downtown district, including 1,400 bales of cotton as well as large lumber reserves; piles of debris reached as high as 16 ft (4.9 m).

=== Lower Rio Grande Valley ===
Brazos Island and Padre Island were inundated by storm surge. The encroaching sea swept 1,500 head of cattle off Padre Island into Laguna Madre. Farther inland, 40–50 mph (64–80 km/h) westerly winds raked the lower Rio Grande Valley, damaging a few buildings. Open cotton in southern and southwestern counties was blown out by the winds. Rains from the hurricane between September 14–16 caused the Rio Grande to overflow its banks, with the pulse of high water beginning in Eagle Pass on September 17 and persisting downstream at Mission to September 30. For upstream portions of the flood, the river rose over two distinct periods, while downstream segments of the river experienced a single, continuous flood event. The severity of the flood was unprecedented for the Rio Grande, with the Monthly Weather Review reporting that the river expanded to a width of 40–50 mi (64–80 km). At Eagle Pass, the Rio Grande rose 27.2 ft (8.3 m) in 24 hours, and at Laredo, it rose 18 ft (5.5 m) in 24 hours. River flooding damaged unharvested crops and delayed the harvest of fall vegetable crops in the lower Rio Grande Valley. One person was killed in Eagle Pass, where the Rio Grande reached a peak stage of 38.5 ft (11.7 m).

=== Inland Texas ===
The San Antonio, Uvalde and Gulf Railroad was washed out west of Odem, Texas. Winds destroyed summer houses and the cotton crop in Victoria, Texas. In San Antonio, the air pressure bottomed out at 998 mbar (hPa; 29.48 inHg) and winds reached 34 mph (55 km/h). Heavy rainfall caused flooding along the lower Colorado, Guadalupe, and Nueces River, with a quick rise inflicted on the Brazos River.

== Aftermath ==
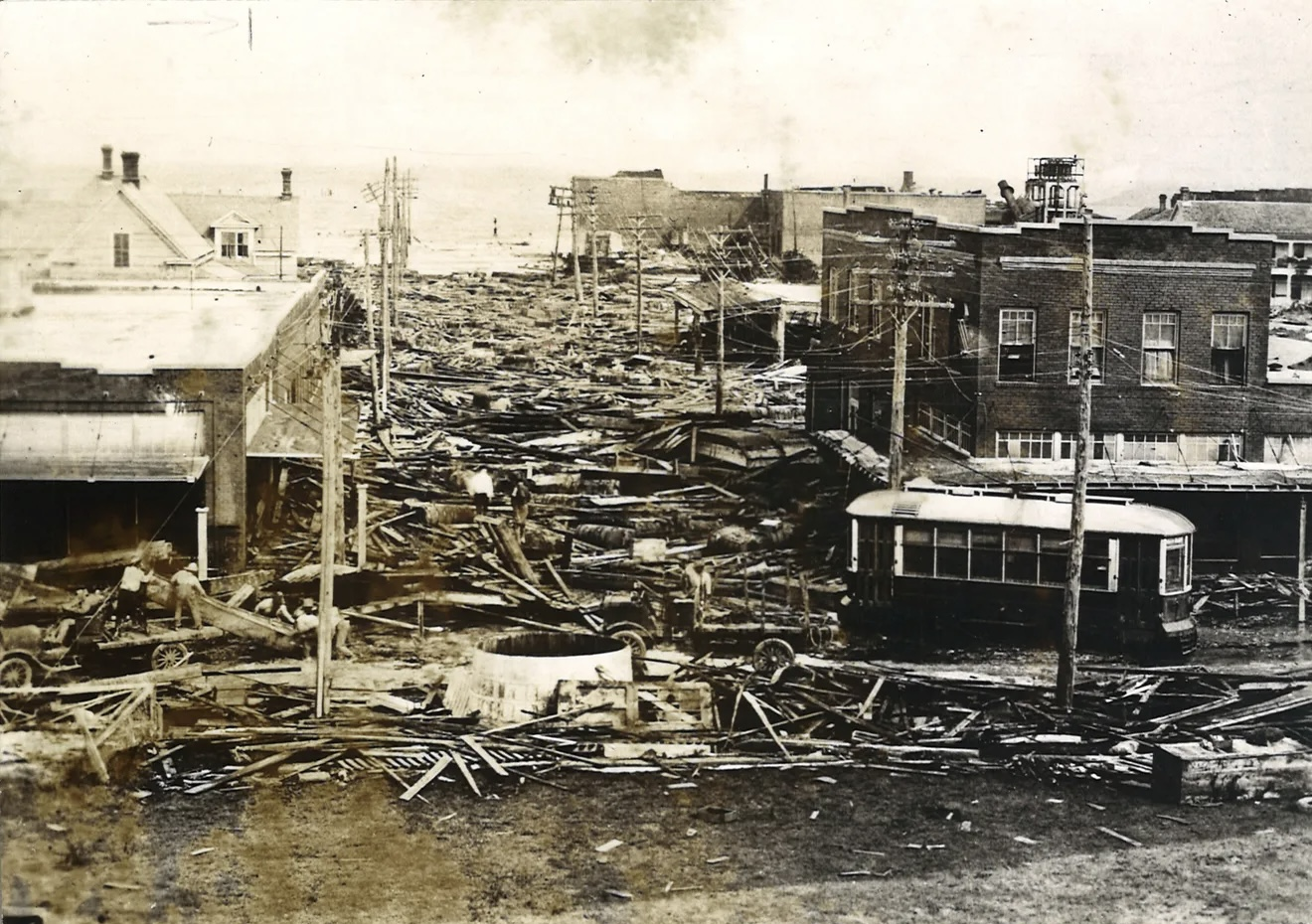
Destruction at Laguna Street toward Corpus Christi Bay after the hurricane

Gordon Boone, the mayor of Corpus Christi, enacted martial law and assembled a General Relief Committee chaired by Roy Miller; the committee remained active for six months. Boone also requested support from the U.S. Army and the Red Cross, with later aid coming from the National Guard. Red Cross workers, military troops, and nurses arrived in Corpus Christi within six hours of the storm's passage, traveling upon relief trains running along the few tracks that withstood the hurricane. The Nueces County Courthouse was used as a morgue and a homeless shelter for over 3,000 people. Informal search parties were assembled to recover bodies and partake in rescues. Corpses continued to be found months after the hurricane's passage. A mass grave was established in White Point for bodies recovered along the beaches. Among the survivors was then six-year-old Robert Simpson, who was inspired to study hurricanes following the 1919 storm and would later head the National Hurricane Center from 1968 to 1974, developing the Saffir–Simpson hurricane wind scale during his directorship.

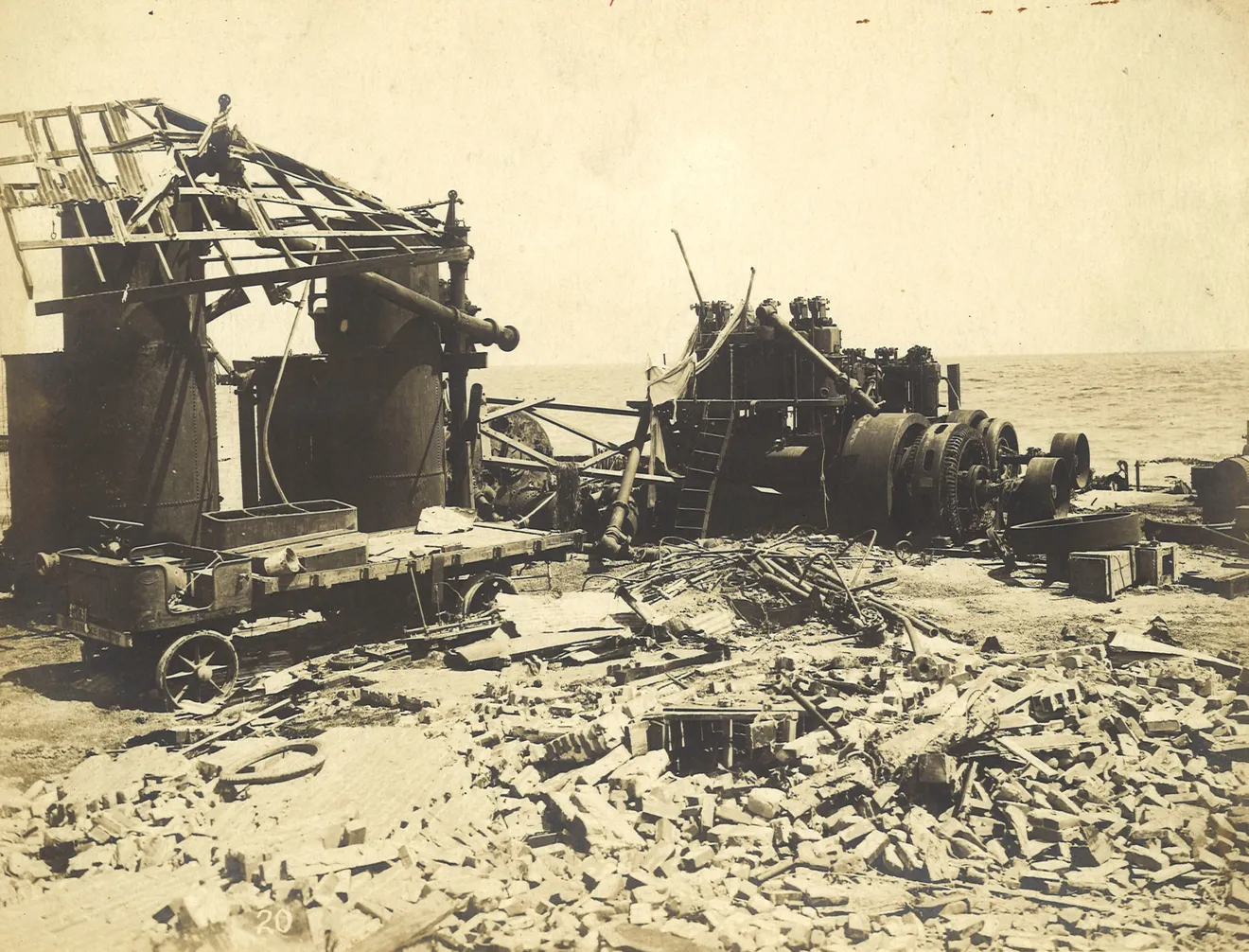
A cotton compress and warehouse destroyed by the hurricane in Corpus Christi

The camaraderie in the hurricane's aftermath between Boone and Miller, once political rivals, led to a resumption of the city's push to build a deep-water port. A special meeting was convened two weeks after the storm between Boone, Miller, and U.S. Representative Carlos Bee, putting forth proposals for a deep freshwater harbor and 3-mile-long (4.8 km) seawall. Bee and Texas Senator Morris Sheppard would later introduce bills in Congress to funnel aid to Corpus Christi and to coax consideration of Corpus Christi as the site of a new deep-water port in the western Gulf. Despite the pledged seawall and financial backing from Bee, the proposal was dropped in favor of a riprap-topped breakwater 4–5 ft (1.2–1.5 m) above sea level extending 2,000 ft (610 m) out from the shoreline. City leaders prioritized the promise of a new harbor, and substituting the original seawall proposal for a breakwater would free up over $2 million towards the harbor effort.

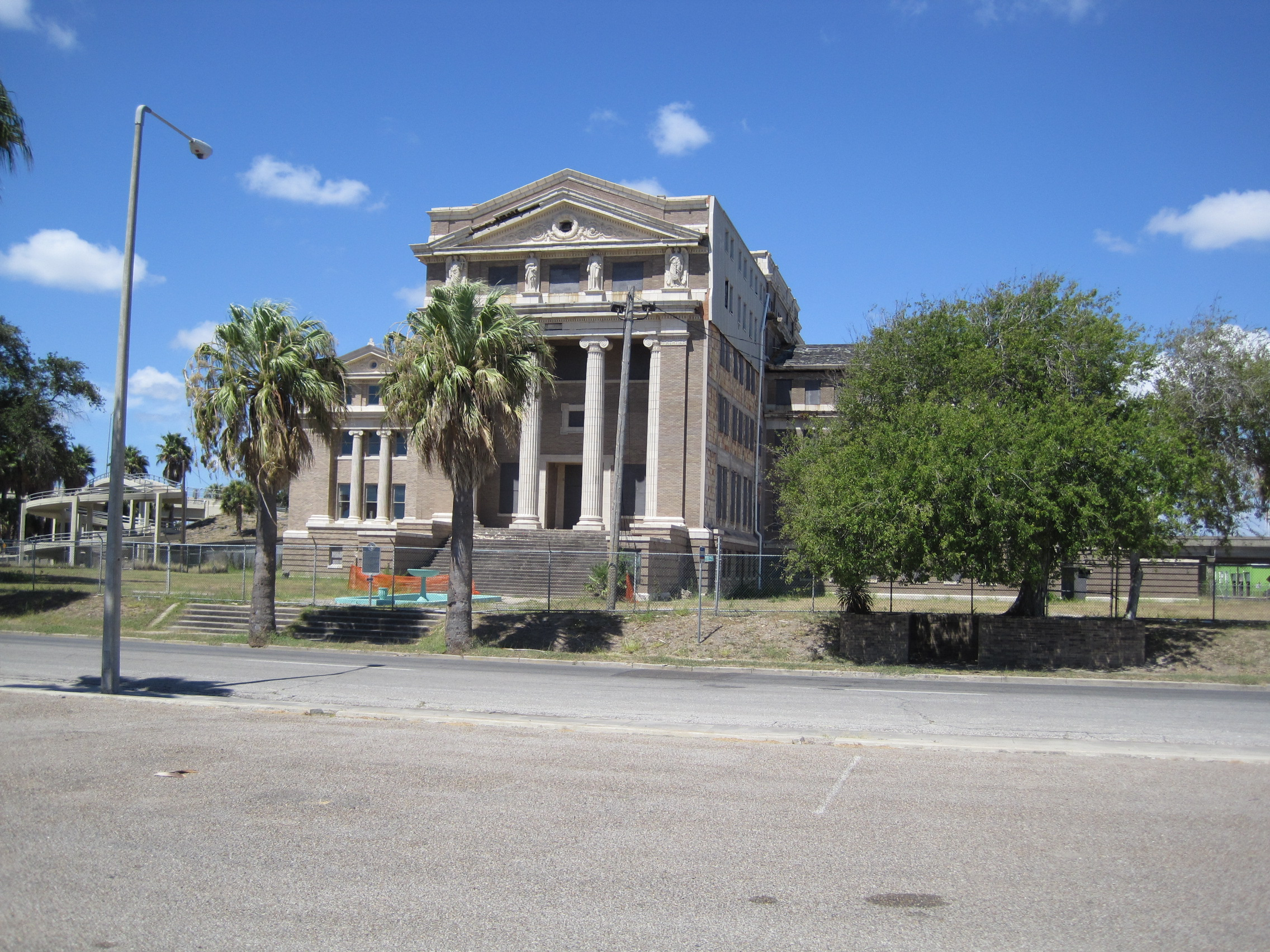
The Nueces County courthouse served as a morgue.

A bill was unanimously passed within the Texas legislature in March 1921 to supply state funding for the construction for the breakwater. In 1922, the Board of Engineers for Rivers and Harbors selected Corpus Christi as the site of a new port. On the seventh anniversary of the 1919 hurricane, a large party was held in celebration of the newly built deep-water port, with politicians and the press from across the country in attendance. The port's construction was billed as "Corpus Christi's destiny," transforming the city into a commercial hub for South Texas. A 12,000-foot-long (3,700 m) seawall was constructed in Corpus Christi in response to the hurricane's devastation. The seawall was primarily made of reinforced concrete and supported by timber and steel sheet pilings. The seawall was named a Texas Historic Civil Engineering Landmark in 1988.

== See also ==
- List of Texas hurricanes (1900–1949)
  - 1900 Galveston hurricane – deadliest hurricane in U.S. history, devastating Galveston and spurring construction of the Galveston Seawall
  - Hurricane Celia – produced widespread wind damage to the Corpus Christi area in 1970
  - 1875 Indianola hurricane – destroyed much of the Texas port city of Indianola
