= Julian Vannerson =

American photographer of the 19th century

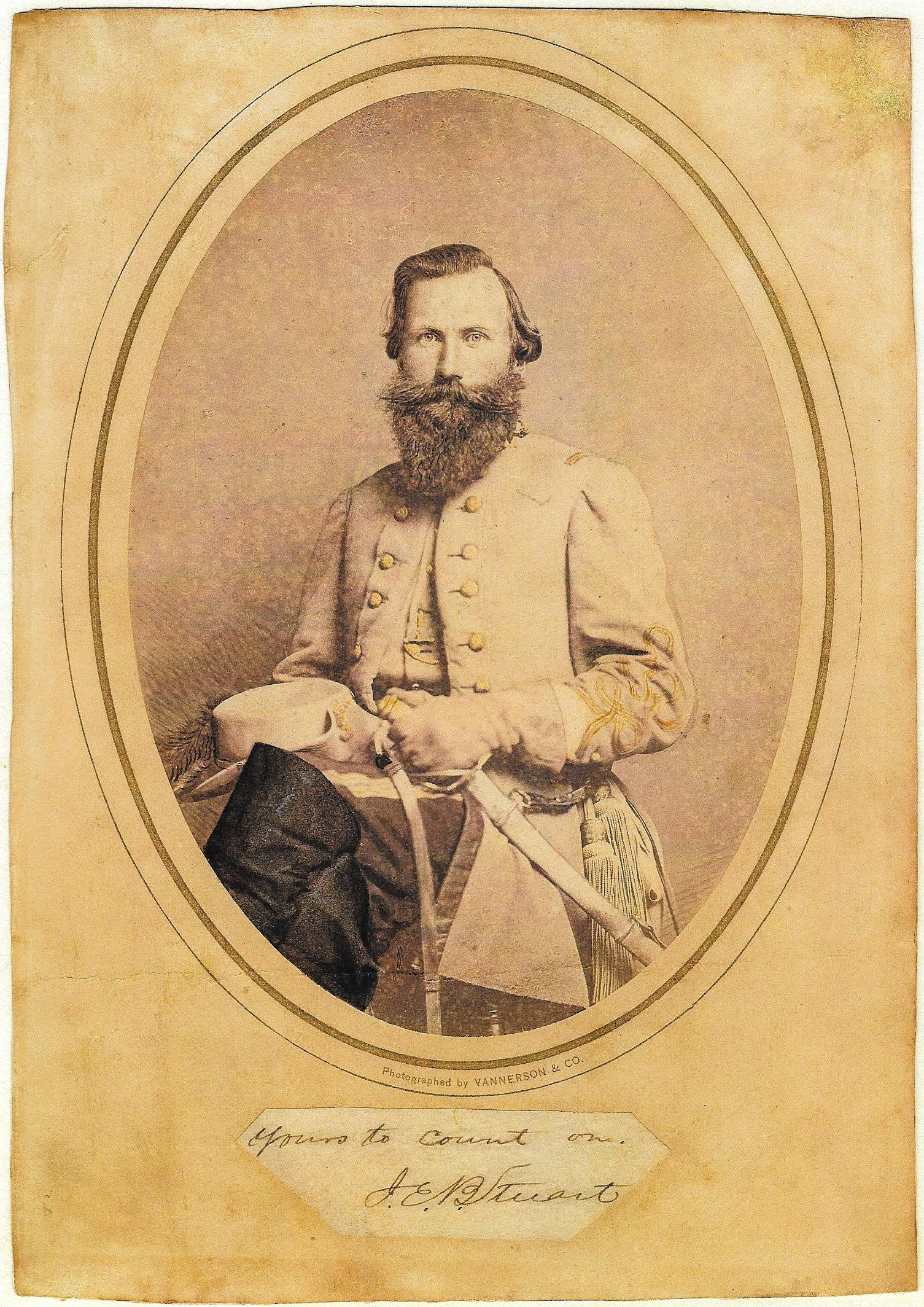
Confederate cavalry general James Ewell Brown "J.E.B." Stuart, the only original glass source print (salt), circa 1863

Julian Vannerson (c. 1827 – after 1875) was an American photographer from Virginia who was most active during the late 1850s and early 1860s. He is best known for his portrait photographs of Confederate Generals and Cabinet members such Robert E. Lee, taken in March 1864, and of J. E. B. Stuart. As well as of multiple prominent American politicians of the era such as 1860 presidential election candidate Stephen A. Douglas.

== See also ==
- Photographers of the American Civil War
