= I Armored Corps (United States) =

- Shoulder sleeve insignia of the I Armored Corps.
- Active: 10 July 1940–11 September 1942; 9 January 1943–10 July 1943
- Country: United States of America
- Branch: United States Army
- Type: Armored Corps
- Role: Headquarters
- Engagements: World War II; European-African-Middle Eastern Theater; Operation Torch; Tunisia Campaign; Battle of Kasserine Pass

Commanders
- Notable commanders: Adna R. Chaffee Jr. Charles L. Scott; George S. Patton Jr.

The I Armored Corps was a corps-sized formation of the United States Army that was active in World War II.

The Corps made landfall in Morocco in French North Africa during Operation Torch in November 1942, the Allied invasion of French North Africa, as the Western Task Force, under the command of Major General George S. Patton, the first all-American force to enter the war against the Germans.

Following the successful defeat of the Axis powers under Generalfeldmarschall Erwin Rommel in North Africa, in May 1943, I Armored Corps was redesignated as the Seventh Army on 10 July 1943 while at sea en route to the Allied invasion of Sicily as the spearhead of Operation Husky.

== History ==
- Established – 15 July 1940 – at Fort Knox, Kentucky under the command of Major General Adna R. Chaffee Jr.
- Change of command – November 1940 – Major General Charles L. Scott assumes command
- Change of command – 15 January 1942 – Major General George S. Patton assumes command
- Transfer of Headquarters – January 1942 – to Fort Benning, Georgia
- Training – 26 March 1942 – Patton designated to set up Desert Training Center
- Training – 10 April 1942 to 30 July 1942 – at Desert Training Center, California-Arizona Maneuver Area (DTC-CAMA)
- Planning – 30 July 1942 – 5 August 1942 – Patton and staff does initial planning for Operation Torch in Washington, DC
- Planning – 5 August 1942 – 21 August 1942 – Patton and staff does higher level planning for Operation Torch in London in the United Kingdom.
- Tactical Deception – 11 September 1942 – I Armored Corps redesignated as Western Task Force to carry out Operation Torch. The Task Force, aimed at Casablanca, was composed of American units, with Major General Patton in command and Rear Admiral Henry Kent Hewitt heading the naval operations. It consisted of the U.S. 3rd and 9th Infantry Divisions, and two battalions from the U.S. 2nd Armored Division, 35,000 troops in a convoy of over 100 ships. They were transported directly from the United States in the first of a new series of UG convoys providing logistic support for the North African campaign.
- Combat Mission – Operation Torch – 8 November 1942 – landed near Casablanca
- Cessation of Tactical Deception – 9 January 1943 – Western Task Force redesignated as I Armored Corps
- Change of command – 4 March 1943 – Patton reassigned to command II Corps after Major General Lloyd Fredendall is relieved following the loss at the Battle of Kasserine Pass
- Change of command – 15 April 1943 – Lieutenant General Patton resumes command
- On 10 July 1943 the personnel and equipment of Headquarters I Armored Corps were used to activate Headquarters and Headquarters Company Seventh Army. However, technically, the two headquarters have no lineage connection.

== Subordinate units ==
- 3rd Infantry Division – 1 February 1943 to 15 July 1943
- 9th Infantry Division – 25 December 1942 to May 1943
- 2nd Armored Division - 25 December 1942 to 15 July 1943

== Shoulder sleeve insignia ==
- Description: On an equilateral triangle with a green border, one point up, divided into three sections, the upper section yellow, the dexter section blue, and the sinister section red, a gun bendwise in front of a tank track and wheels all black and overall a red lightning flash bend sinisterwise. In the apex the Roman numeral "I" in black.
- Symbolism:
1. Yellow, blue, and red are the colors of the branches from which armored units were formed (cavalry, infantry and artillery respectively) .
2. The tank tread, gun, and lightning flash are symbolic of mobility, power, and speed.
3. The corps designation is in Roman numerals.

No Distinctive unit insignia was approved.

== Sources ==
- Gabel, Christopher R. (1991). The US Army GHQ Maneuvers of 1941. Washington, D.C.: United States Army Center of Military History/US Government Printing Office.
- Hague, Arnold (2000). The Allied Convoy System 1939–1945. Naval Institute Press. ISBN 1-55750-019-3.
- Wilson, John B., ed. (1999). CMH Publication 60-7:Armies, corps, divisions, and separate brigades. Washington, D.C.: United States Army Center of Military History/US Government Printing Office. p. 43. ISBN 0-16-049994-1.
