= Biggs Army Airfield =

US Army military airport located on the Fort Bliss military base in El Paso, TX

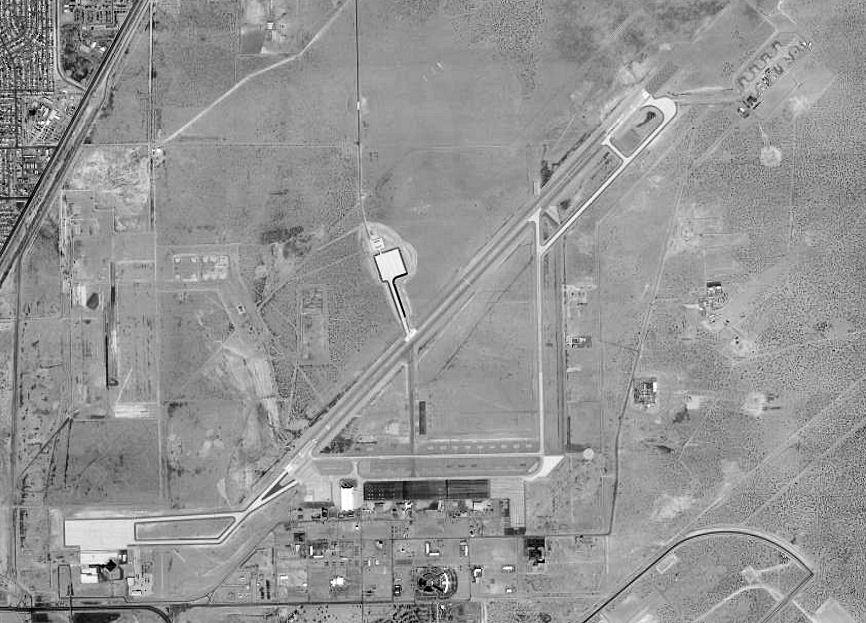
- USGS 1996 photo of Biggs Army Airfield
- IATA: BIF; ICAO: KBIF; FAA LID: BIF

Summary
- Airport type: Military
- Owner: United States Army
- Location: Fort Bliss, El Paso, Texas
- Built: 1916
- In use: 1916–present
- Elevation AMSL: 3,946 ft / 1,203 m
- Coordinates: 31.849°N 106.367°W
- Interactive map of Biggs Army Airfield

Runways
Direction	Length		Surface
Direction	ft	m	Surface
4/22	13,554	4,131	Asphalt concrete

Biggs Army Airfield (IATA: BIF, ICAO: KBIF, FAA LID: BIF) (formerly Biggs Air Force Base) is a United States Army military airbase located on the Fort Bliss military base in El Paso, Texas.

== History ==
=== Biggs Field (1916–47) ===
On 15 June 1919, following an attack by Pancho Villa's forces on Ciudad Juárez, United States Army Air Service personnel equipped with Dayton-Wright DH-4 aircraft were sent to Fort Bliss to begin patrols of the U.S.-Mexico border, initiating the United States Army Border Air Patrol. In August 1919 construction commenced on a steel hangar for an airship station at Camp Owen Bierne, Fort Bliss and in December 1919 the 8th Balloon Company moved there from Brooks Field, Texas. In January 1920 the 1st Surveillance Group moved from Kelly Field to Fort Bliss.

The airfield was officially named "Biggs Field" on 5 January 1925 after Lieutenant James Berthea "Buster" Biggs, an El Paso native killed in a plane crash on 27 October 1918 at Belrain, France.

=== Biggs Air Force Base (1947–66) ===
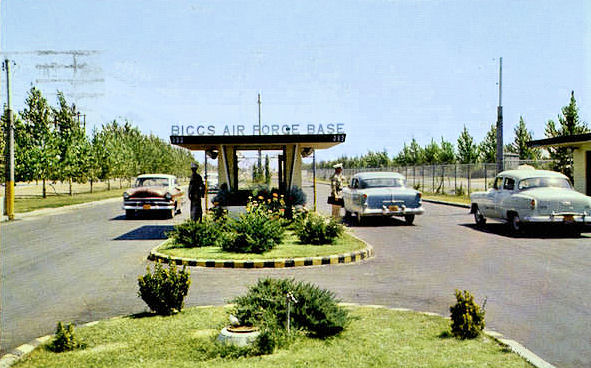
Biggs AFB gate in the late 1950s

On 16 March 1948 the 97th Bombardment Wing, Heavy operating B-29 Superfortresses moved to Biggs AFB from Smoky Hill Air Force Base, Kansas.

The 810th Air Division was activated at Biggs AFB on 16 June 1952, it comprised the 95th Bombardment Wing (H), 97th Bombardment Wing (H) and the 810th Air Base Group. In September 1953, the 95th began training with the B-36 Peacemaker bomber while the 97th flew the B-50 Superfortress.

On 12 February 1959, the last operational B-36J Peacemaker left Biggs AFB where it had been serving with the 95th Bombardment Wing. The 95th then transitioned to the B-52B Stratofortress and the KC-135A Stratotanker.

In July 1959 the 97th Bombardment Wing (H) moved from Biggs AFB to Blytheville Air Force Base, Arkansas.

On 1 July 1962 the 810th Air Division moved from Biggs AFB to Minot Air Force Base, North Dakota.

In December 1965 it was announced that Biggs AFB would be closed. In January 1966 Assistant Secretary of Defense (Installations and Logistics) Paul Ignatius testified to Congress that "The operational environment at Biggs poses serious problems. Such factors as the proximity of El Paso International Airport, the suburbs of El Paso, and mountainous areas adjacent to Biggs…weapons testing areas to the north and the convergence of civil airways carrying heavy…traffic combine to create serious safety and traffic control problems."

On 25 June 1966 the 95th Bombardment Wing (H) moved from Biggs AFB to Goose Air Base, Newfoundland.

=== Biggs Army Airfield (1966–1973) ===
Starting in 1966, a branch of the Defense Language Institute (DLI) conducted Vietnamese training using native contract instructors at the airfield. Vietnamese instruction continued at the Defense Language Institute-Southwest (DLISW) until 2004, concurrent with the establishment in 1972 of the US Army's Sergeants Major Academy.

=== Biggs Army Airfield (1973–present) ===
The former Biggs AFB remained under DoD control in a caretaker status until 1973 when it was transferred to the U.S. Army as a sub-post of nearby Fort Bliss. Renamed Biggs Army Airfield, the installation was reactivated in 1973 as a permanent airfield for the U.S. Army, which turned into the world’s largest Army Airfield at that time.

Biggs AAF was used as a refueling stop for NASA's Shuttle Carrier Aircraft.

Biggs AAF is the base of Joint Task Force North, a United States Department of Defense multi-service organization tasked to support Federal law enforcement in the United States in the interdiction of suspected transnational threats within and along the approaches to the continental United States.

The Border Patrol Tactical Unit (BORTAC) operates from its headquarters co-located with its training unit at Biggs Army Airfield.

The Silas L. Copeland Arrival/Departure Airfield Control Group at Biggs Army Airfield serves military and civilian personnel who deploy to their overseas assignments, such as to and from Southwest Asia.

On 14 July 2017 a new 116-foot (35 m) air traffic control tower was opened at the field.

The annual Amigo Airsho, which was held at Biggs Army Airfield from 1982 - 2012 is set to return in October 2024, after a 12 year hiatus.

== Units ==
- 1st Armored Division
  - Combat Aviation Brigade, 1st Armored Division "Iron Eagle"
    - HHC
    - 1st Battalion (Attack), 501st Aviation Regiment "Iron Dragons"
    - 2nd Battalion (General Support), 501st Aviation Regiment "Desert Knights"
    - 3rd Battalion (Assault), 501st Aviation Regiment "Apocalypse"
    - 3rd Squadron (Heavy Attack-Reconnaissance), 6th Cavalry Regiment "Heavy Cavalry"
    - 127th Aviation Support Battalion "Work Horse"

== Accidents and incidents ==
- 8 December 1941: B-26 40-1443 crashed shortly after takeoff. All 4 crewmembers killed.
- 20 May 1944: B-24J 42-100002 after takeoff crashed 6 miles (9.7 km) north of the base. 2 crewmembers killed.
- 18 April 1951: B-50D 49-0279 after takeoff crashed 2 miles (3.2 km) north of the base. 1 crewmember killed.
- 11 December 1953: B-36B 44-92071 crashed into the Franklin Mountains while on approach to Biggs. All 9 crewmembers were killed.
- 28 August 1954: B-36D 44-92097, lost power on approach to Briggs and crashed. 1 crewmember killed
- 31 August 1957: C-124C 52-1021, operated by the 1st Strategic Support Squadron, crashed during an instrument flight rules approach to Biggs AFB, in bad weather. 5 aircrew were killed, 10 injured.
- 5 March 1961: KB-50D 49-0328 on a flight from Wake Island crashed 6 miles (9.7 km) from Biggs on a night visual flight rules approach. All 9 crewmembers were killed.
