= 7th Cavalry Brigade (United States) =

The 7th Cavalry Brigade was a brigade of the United States Army, active from 1932 to 1940.

Colonel Daniel Van Voorhis took 175 officers and enlisted men from Fort Eustis to Fort Knox in February 1932, establishing a Provisional Armored Car Platoon. This was based on an earlier effort but was predicated on a new Cavalry Regiment TO&E (Table of Organization and Equipment) published that year. Also published but never implemented was a cavalry division TO&E, which reflected the then unnatural assimilation of machines into the Horse Cavalry. Van Voorhis's cadre and platoon became the kernel for the 7th Cavalry Brigade, which went active on March 1, 1932, at Fort Knox. At first, it was nothing more than a headquarters detachment and the Armored Car Platoon.

On 3 January 1933, the 1st Cavalry Regiment was relieved from assignment to the 1st Cavalry Division and was moved from Fort D.A. Russell to Fort Knox. The earlier Mechanized Platoon was incorporated into the new regimental TO&E, and the result was the 1st Cavalry Regiment [Mechanized], which went active on 16 January 1933. The new regimental commander was Colonel Van Voorhis, late of the experimental Mechanized Force, while the executive officer was Adna Chaffee. The Post Commander of Fort Knox was Brigadier General Julian R. Lindsey, another cavalryman. Major Robert W. Grow was on the regimental staff to round out the cavalry nature of the unit.

Van Voorhis added the 13th Cavalry Regiment, the 68th Field Artillery Battalion, the 7th Reconnaissance Squadron, the 7th Signal Troop, the 4th Medical Troop, the 47th Engineer Troop and the 17th Quartermaster Battalion. The 7th Cavalry Brigade was fully formed. Van Voorhis remained in command until September 1938, when he was promoted to command the V Corps (United States) at Indianapolis, Indiana. Chaffee took over from Van Voorhis.

On May 7, 1940, the 7th Cavalry Brigade took part in the Louisiana Maneuvers at Monroe, Louisiana, instrumental in developing the armoured division concept. The manoeuvres concluded on 27 May 1940, and the brigade returned to Fort Knox on 31 May 1940, and preparations began to expand the brigade into a tank division.

After the brutal trench warfare of World War I, the United States was looking for new ways to engage in armed conflict. As the German Army invaded France, Belgium, Luxembourg, and the Netherlands, the United States military hierarchy realized that an armoured division was essential for a modern army. While training outside of Alexandria, Louisiana, the commanders of the 7th Cavalry Brigade met in a high school basement to discuss the creation of an American armoured division. Major General Frank M. Andrews, Generals Adna R. Chaffee and Bruce Magruder, and Colonel George S. Patton Jr. agreed to recommend to Washington that the U.S. Army establish its first tank division.

On 10 July 1940, in a conference with the Chief of Staff of the Army, the U.S. Army founded an Armored Force. Two weeks later, General Adna R. Chaffee was ordered to head the creation of America's first tank division.

Soon afterwards, the new 1st Armored Division absorbed the 7th Cavalry Brigade.
