= Combat Aviation Brigade, 1st Armored Division (United States) =

Aviation brigade of the 1st Armored Division, US Army

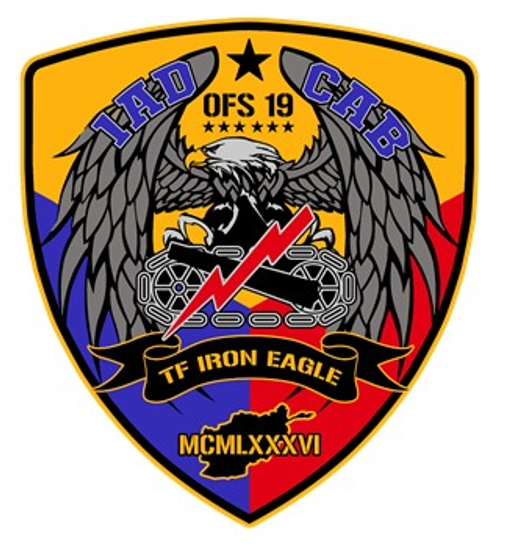
- Aviation Patch 1AD Combat Aviation Brigade
- Country: United States
- Size: Brigade
- Garrison/HQ: Biggs Army Airfield, Fort Bliss
- Nickname: Iron Eagles
- Motto: Iron Eagles Iron Soldiers

Commanders
- Commanding Officer: COL John Collins
- Command Chief Warrant Officer: CW5 Scott Bean
- Command Sergeant Major: CSM Matthew Thomas

The Combat Aviation Brigade, 1st Armored Division is a Combat Aviation Brigade which has been part of the 1st Armored Division of the United States Army since the 1980s.

The brigade was constituted on 16 April 1986 in the Regular Army as Headquarters and Headquarters Company, Aviation Brigade, 1st Armored Division, and activated in Germany. Just over 20 years later, it was inactivated 15 July 2006 in Germany.

It was redesignated on 1 6 September 2011 as Headquarters and Headquarters Company, Combat Aviation Brigade, 1st Armored Division, and activated at Fort Bliss, Texas.

== Structure in 2019 ==
Units in March 2019:

- 3d Squadron (Heavy Attack Reconnaissance), 6th Cavalry Regiment (AH-64Ds & RQ-7 Shadow) "Heavy Cav"
- 1st Battalion (Attack Reconnaissance), 501st Aviation Regiment (AH-64D) "Iron Dragons"
- 2d Battalion (General Support), 501st Aviation Regiment (UH/HH-60, CH-47F) "Iron Knights"
- 3d Battalion (Assault Helicopter), 501st Aviation Regiment (UH-60M) "Apocalypse"
- 127th Aviation Support Battalion (127th ASB) "Workhorse"
- Company E, 501st Aviation Regiment (Gray Eagle) "Executioners"
