= 16th Engineer Battalion (United States) =

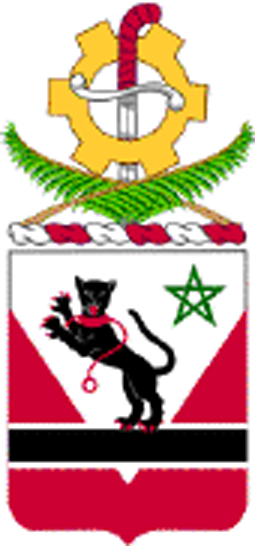
- Coat of Arms
- Active: 11 December 1935 – 13 April 1946; 7 March 1951 – 12 December 1957; 3 February 1962 – Present
- Country: United States
- Allegiance: Regular Army
- Branch: US Army Corps of Engineers
- Nickname(s): "Catamounts." (Special Designation)
- Motto(s): "SEMPER ULTIMO" (Always On Top)
- ACE Colors: Scarlet and White
- Engagements: World War II; Tunisia; Naples-Foggia; Anzio; Rome-Arno; North Apennines; Po Valley Southwest Asia; Defense of Saudi Arabia; Liberation and Defense of Kuwait; Cease-Fire Company B additionally entitled to: World War II-EAME: Algeria-French Morocco
- Decorations: Valorous Unit Award; IRAQ-KUWAIT Army Superior Unit Award; 1995–1996 Company A additionally entitled to: Presidential Unit Citation (Army); MT. PORCHIA

Insignia
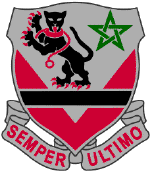
- Distinctive Unit Insignia

The 16th Engineer Battalion is a Combat Engineer Battalion in the United States Army, first established in 1935.

== Lineage ==
- Constituted 11 December 1935 in the Regular Army as the 16th Engineer Regiment
- Redesignated 15 July 1940 as the 16th Engineer Battalion; concurrently assigned to the 1st Armored Division and activated at Fort Knox, Kentucky
- Redesignated 1 January 1942 as the 16th Armored Engineer Battalion
- Unit deployed from the New York Port of Embarkation on 11 May 1942
- Unit arrived in Northern Ireland on 18 May 1942.
- Unit arrived in North Africa on 21 December 1942. It immediately participated in the Tunisia Campaign.
- The Tunisia Campaign concluded on 13 May 1943.
- Unit arrived in Sicily on 10 July 1943, and participated in Operation Husky.
- The Sicily Campaign concluded on 17 August 1943.
- Unit arrived in Italy on 10 November 1943, and participated in the Naples-Foggia Campaign.
- The Naples-Foggia Campaign concluded on 21 January 1944.
- The Battalion took part in the Anzio Campaign from 22 January 1944.
- The Anzio Campaign concluded on 24 May 1944.
- The battalion participated in the Rome-Arno Campaign from 22 January 1944.
- (Companies D and E disbanded 20 July 1944 in Italy)
- The Rome-Arno Campaign concluded on 9 September 1944.
- The battalion participated in the North Apennines Campaign from 10 September 1944.
- The North Apennines Campaign concluded on 4 April 1945.
- The battalion participated in the Po Valley Campaign from 5 April 1945.
- The Po Valley Campaign concluded on 8 May 1945
- The battalion was located at Salzburg, Austria on 14 August 1945.
- Battalion arrived back in CONUS at the New York Port of Embarkation 10–13 April 1946.
- Remainder of battalion inactivated 10–13 April 1946 at Camp Kilmer, New Jersey
- Company D reconstituted 27 February 1951.
- 16th Armored Engineer Battalion activated 7 March 1951 at Fort Hood, Texas
- Redesignated 15 February 1957 as the 16th Engineer Battalion
- Inactivated (less Company A) 23 December 1957 at Fort Polk, Louisiana
- Activated (less Company A (active) 3 February 1962 at Fort Hood, Texas
- Moved on 10 May 1970 from Fort Hood, Texas to Johnson Barracks, Fürth, West Germany
- 1971-1985 Supported Cold War Atomic Demolition Munitions (ADM) Operations as defense against Russian invasion of West Germany.
- Relieved 16 June 1991 from assignment to the 1st Armored Division and assigned to the 3d Infantry Division's newly formed Engineer Brigade
- Moved on 15 June 1992 from Furth, Germany to Ferris Barracks, Erlangen, Germany
- Relieved 16 November 1993 from assignment to the 3rd Infantry Division
- Assigned 16 February 1997 to the 1st Armored Division US Army Depot Giessen, Germany
- Inactivated 17 July 2007 at Fort Hood, Texas, and relieved from assignment to the 1st Armored Division
- Assigned 16 November 2013 to the 1st Brigade Combat Team, 1st Armored Division, and activated at Fort Bliss, Texas

== Honors ==
=== Campaign participation credit ===
- World War II: Tunisia; Naples-Foggia; Anzio (with arrowhead); Rome-Arno; North Apennines; Po Valley
- Southwest Asia: Defense of Saudi Arabia; Liberation and Defense of Kuwait; Cease-Fire
- War on Terrorism: Campaigns to be determined

Company B additionally entitled to:

- World War II: Algeria-French Morocco (with arrowhead)

=== Decorations ===
- Presidential Unit Citation (Army), Streamer embroidered IRAQ 2004
- Valorous Unit Award, Streamer embroidered IRAQ-KUWAIT 1991
- Navy Unit Commendation, Streamer embroidered ANBAR PROVINCE 2006-2007
- Army Superior Unit Award, Streamer embroidered 1995-1996

Company A additionally entitled to:

- Presidential Unit Citation (Army), Streamer embroidered MT. PORCHIA
- Meritorious Unit Commendation (Army), Streamer embroidered IRAQ JAN-MAR 2004

== Insignia ==
=== Coat of arms ===
==== Blazon ====
- Shield: Per chevron reversed Argent and Gules, on a bar in base Sable fimbriated of the first a cat-a-mountain salient guardant of the third, armed langued, collared and lined of the second, in sinister chief a mullet voided and fretted Vert.
- Crest: From a wreath Argent and Gules from two palm branches saltirewise Proper issuing a demi-scimitar palewise of the first gripped of the second and enfiled by a cogwheel Or.
- Motto: SEMPER ULTIMO (Always on Top).

==== Symbolism ====
- Shield:
1. Red and white are the colors used for the Corps of Engineers.
2. The bar symbolizes a treadway bridge, the construction of which was a major combat mission of the organization.
3. The cat-a-mountain, a European wildcat, indicates the stealth and swiftness required in combat engineer operations, 16 claws represents the Battalions steadfast commitment to the mission and the soldiers of the battalion are known as "Catamounts."
4. The black cat also connotes the darkness in which operations are conducted.
5. The star from the flag of French Morocco represents service in that area during World War II.
6. The inverted chevron symbolizes the battalion's spearheading of armored engineer activity in World War II.
- Crest:
1. The six teeth on the gear wheel represent the unit's campaign service during World War II.
2. Gold denotes excellence, while the gear wheel alludes to engineering.
3. The scimitar honors the battalion's Valorous Unit award for IRAQ-KUWAIT, and the crossed palms highlight the unit's Southwest Asia campaigns.
- Background:
1. The coat of arms was originally approved for the 16th Armored Engineer Battalion on 25 April 1952.
2. It was redesignated for the 16th Engineer Battalion on 12 September 1957.
3. The coat of arms was amended on 5 December 1984 to correct the motto.
4. On 21 October 1994 the coat of arms was revised to change the symbolism.
5. It was amended on 29 September 1999.

=== Distinctive unit insignia ===
- Description: A silver color metal and enamel device 1 1/8 inches (29 mm) high overall consisting of a shield blazoned: Per chevron reversed Argent and Gules, on a bar in base Sable fimbriated of the first a cat-a-mountain salient guardant of the third, armed, langued, collared and lined of the second, in sinister chief a mullet voided and fretted Vert. Attached below the shield a silver scroll inscribed "SEMPER ULTIMO" in red letters.
- Symbolism:
1. Red and white are the colors used for the Corps of Engineers.
2. The bar symbolizes a treadway bridge, the construction of which was a major combat mission of the organization.
3. The cat-a-mountain, a European wildcat, indicates the stealth and swiftness required in combat engineer operations, and the soldiers of the battalion are known as "Catamounts."
4. The black cat also connotes the darkness in which operations are conducted.
5. The star from the flag of French Morocco represents service in that area during World War II.
6. The inverted chevron symbolizes the battalion's spearheading of armored engineer activity in World War II.
- Background:
1. The Distinctive Unit Insignia was originally approved for the 16th Armored Engineer Battalion on 25 April 1952.
2. It was redesignated for the 16th Engineer Battalion on 12 September 1957.
3. On 5 December 1984 the insignia was amended to correct the symbolism.
4. On 21 October 1994 it was revised to change the description and the symbolism.
