= 1st Armored Division (United States) =

US Army mechanized formation

- Insignia of the 1st Armored Division
- Active: 16 January 1932–25 April 1946; 7 March 1951–present
- Country: United States
- Branch: United States Army
- Type: Combined arms
- Size: Division
- Part of: III Armored Corps
- Nickname: "Old Ironsides"
- Motto: Iron Soldiers!
- March: Iron Soldier March
- Engagements: World War II; Algeria-French Morocco; Tunisia; Naples-Foggia; Rome-Arno; Anzio; North Apennines; Po Valley; Gulf War; Defense of Saudi Arabia; Liberation of Kuwait; War on Terror; Afghanistan War; Iraq War; Operation Inherent Resolve
- Decorations: Meritorious Unit Commendation

Commanders
- Current commander: Brigadier General Brandon C. Anderson
- Deputy Commanding General - Operations: Brigadier General Alric L. Francis
- Deputy Commander - Support: Brigadier General Paul Krattiger
- Deputy Commanding General - Maneuver: Brigadier Andrew Ridland, British Army
- Chief of Staff: Colonel David A. Norris
- Command Sergeant Major: CSM Carvet C. Tate
- Notable commanders: Orlando Ward; Ernest N. Harmon

Insignia
- Flag

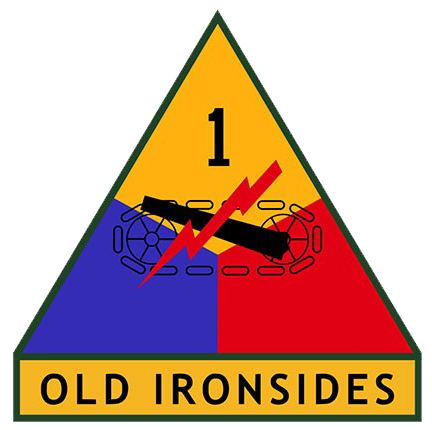
- Distinctive unit insignia

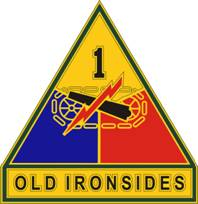
- Combat service identification badge
NATO Map Symbol
1
III

The 1st Armored Division, nicknamed "Old Ironsides", is a combined arms division of the United States Army. The division is part of III Armored Corps and operates out of Fort Bliss in El Paso, Texas. It was the first armored division of the United States Army to see battle in World War II. Since World War II, the division has been involved in the Cuban Missile Crisis, Persian Gulf War, Iraq, Afghanistan, and several other operations. The division has also received numerous awards and recognition.

== History ==
=== World War II ===
On 15 July 1940, the 1st Armored Division, largely an expanded and reorganized version of the 7th Cavalry Brigade, was activated at Fort Knox under the command of Major General Bruce Magruder. The 1st Cavalry Regiment was re-designated as the 1st Armored Regiment and the 13th Cavalry Regiment was re-designated as the 13th Armored Regiment under the 1st Armored Brigade, 1st Armored Division. For more than two years after its activation, the 1st Armored Division trained at Fort Knox and the division pioneered and developed tank gunnery and strategic armored offensives while increasing from 66 medium-sized tanks to over 600 medium and light armored vehicles.

==== Training ====
On 15 July 1940 the division was established at Fort Knox, Kentucky. The U.S. Army had never had an armored division before and the troops necessary for this kind of force were drawn from a variety of army posts.

When the organization was completed, the division had tanks, artillery, and infantry as combat forces. In direct support were tank destroyer, maintenance, medical, supply and engineer battalions, but bringing the division up to its full quota of equipment and vehicles was difficult. Although new equipment was received almost daily, the division had only nine outdated medium tanks primarily armed with guns until March 1941. Most of the division attended the Armored Force School at Knox to train in using their newly acquired tanks, half-tracks, and guns.

At Fort Knox, the division participated in the Technicolor short movie The Tanks Are Coming (as the "First Armored Force"). It deployed to participate in the VII Corps Maneuvers on 18 August 1941. Once the maneuvers concluded, the 1st Armored Division then moved on 28 August 1941 and arrived at Camp Polk for the Second Army Louisiana Maneuvers on 1 September 1941. They then moved to Fort Jackson on 30 October 1941 to participate in the First Army Carolina Maneuvers.

The division returned to Fort Knox on 7 December 1941 but started to prepare for deployment overseas instead of returning to garrison. Training took on a new intensity. The division was reorganized, and all tanks, both medium and light were put into two armored regiments, the 1st and 13th. A third armored field artillery battalion, the 91st, was formed, and the 701st Tank Destroyer Battalion was organized and attached to the division.

The 1st Armored Division was ordered to Fort Dix on 11 April 1942 to await their deployment overseas. The division's port call required them to board the RMS Queen Mary at the New York Port of Embarkation at the Brooklyn Army Terminal on 11 May 1942. They arrived in Northern Ireland on 16 May 1942 and trained on the moors until they moved on to England on 29 October 1942. The division was now commanded by Major General Orlando Ward.

==== Combat operations ====
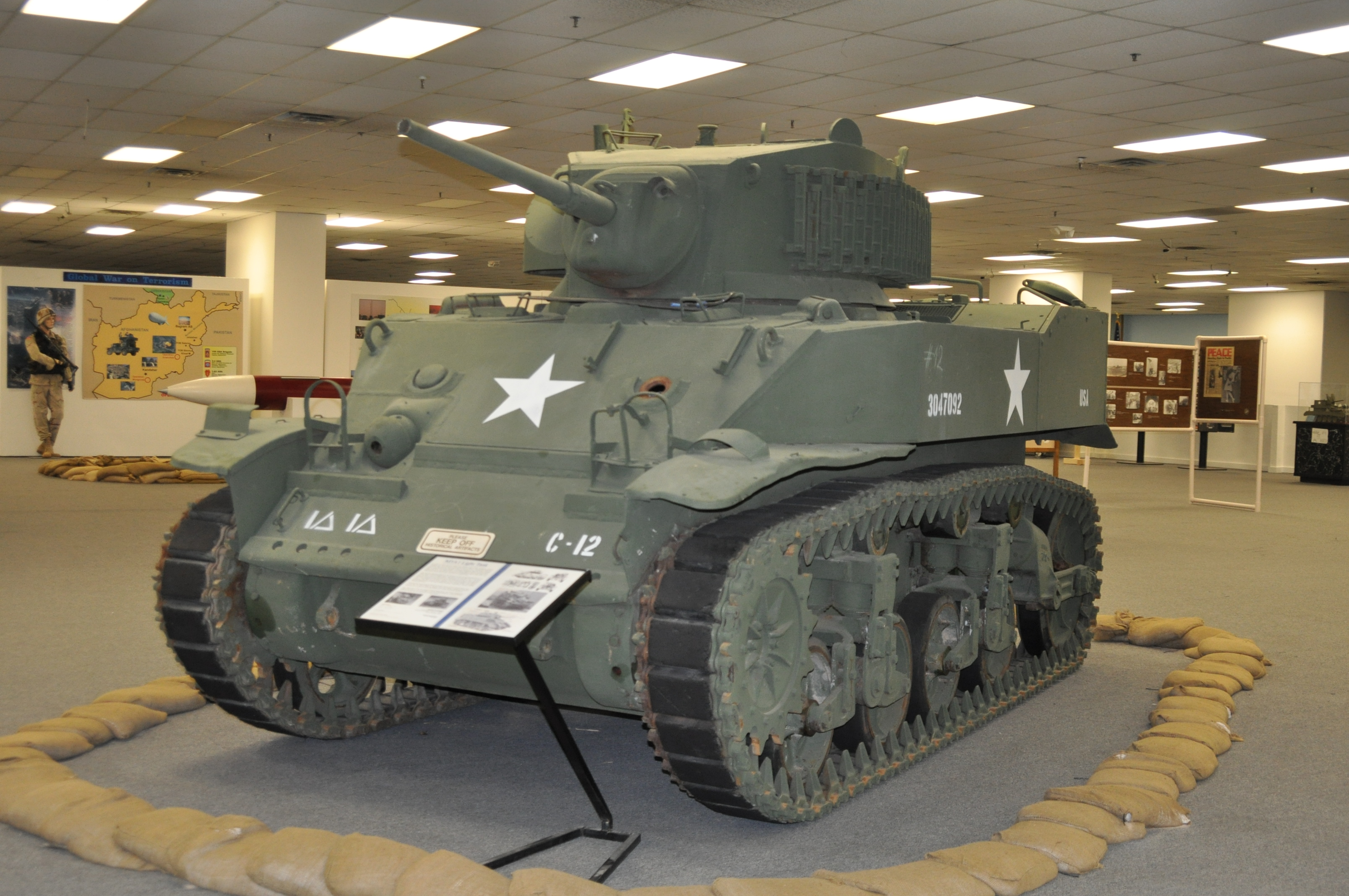
The M5 Stuart tank was used by "Iron Soldiers" during World War II.

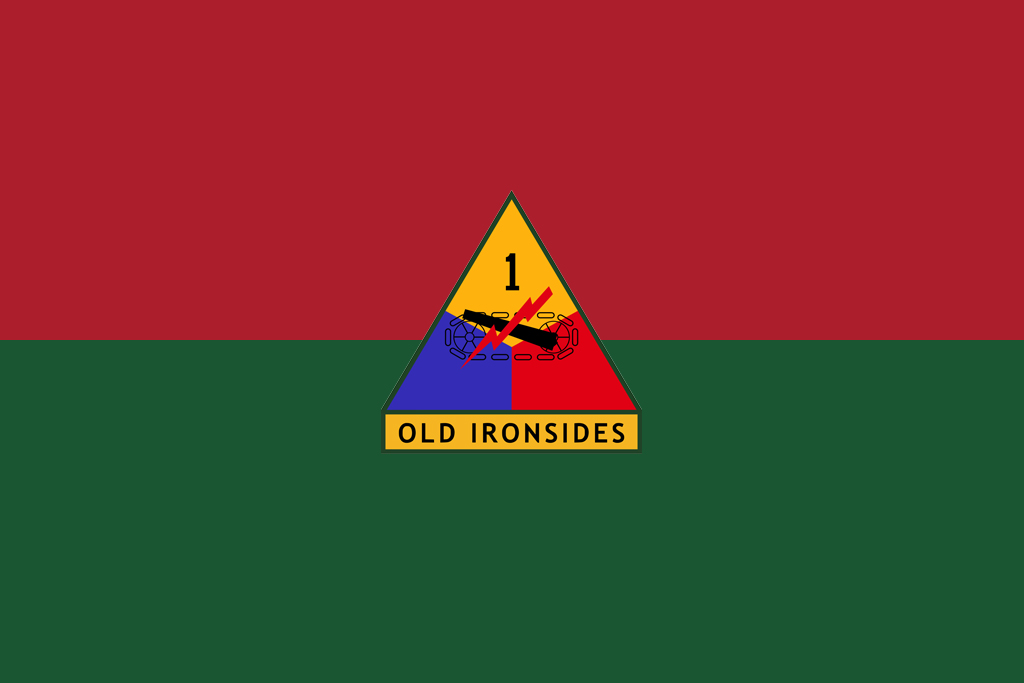
WWII 1st Armored Division Flag

A volunteer troop of three M3 Lee crews from the 1st Armored Division commanded by Henry Cabot Lodge Jr. fought in the Battle of Gazala under British command in June 1942, becoming the first Americans to engage the Germans on land in the war.

For the upcoming Allied invasion of Northwest Africa (Operation TORCH), many elements of the Division were alerted:

- 1st Battalion of the 1st Armored Regiment
- 1st and 2nd Battalions of the 13th Armored Regiment
- nearly all the 6th Armored Infantry Regiment
- 27th Armored Field Artillery Battalion
- "B" and "C" Companies of the 701st Tank Destroyer Battalion
- Detachments of
  - 16th Armored Engineer Battalion
  - Supply Battalion
  - Maintenance Battalion
  - 47th Armored Medical Battalion
  - 141st Signal Company

These elements became part of the Center Task Force of TORCH.

On 8 November 1942, Combat Command B (CCB) of the division landed east and west of Oran, Algeria, under the command of Brigadier General Lunsford E. Oliver. The beach landings were unopposed, but Vichy French troops in the area resisted the Allied advance inland. This was the Division's proper first contact with an enemy, and the Division was the first American armored division to see combat in World War II.

The Division overcame this resistance, captured the Airport at Tafraoui, and entered the city on 10 November 1942. The Oran area was secure and CCB moved to Bedja, in Tunisia, arriving by 24 November. CCB raided the Djedeida airfield on 25 November next day and occupied the city on 28 November. CCB thenmoved southwest of Tebourba on 1 December, and engaged with German forces on El Guessa Heights on 3 December 1942. but its lines were pierced on 6 December 1942. CCB withdrew to Bedja with heavy equipment losses between 10 and 11 December 1942 and was placed in reserve. CCB next attacked in the Ousseltia Valley on 21 January 1943, and cleared that area until 29 January 1943 when sent to Bou Chebka, and arrived at Maktar on 14 February 1943.

Combat Command A (CCA) fought at Faïd Pass commencing on 30 January 1943, and advanced to Sidi Bou Zid, where it was pushed back with heavy tank losses on 14 February 1943, and had elements isolated on Djebel Lessouda, Djebel Kasaira, and Garet Hadid. Combat Command C (CCC), which was formed on 23 January 1943 to raid Sened Station on 24 January, advanced towards Sbeita and counterattacked to support CCA in the Sidi Bou Zid area on 15 February 1943, but was forced to retreat with heavy losses. The division withdrew from Sbeita on 16 February 1943, but by 21 February 1943 CCB contained the German attack toward Tébessa. The German withdrawal allowed the division to recover Kasserine Pass on 26 February 1943 and assemble in reserve. The division moved northeast of Gafsa on 13 March 1943 and attacked in heavy rains on 17 March 1943 as CCA took Zannouch, but became immobilized by rain the next day. The division drove on Maknassy on 20 March 1943, and fought the Battle of Djebel Naemia on 22–25 March 1943, and then fought to break through positions barring the road to Gabès between 29 March and 1 April 1943. It followed up on the withdrawing German forces on 6 April 1943 and attacked towards Mateur with CCA on 27 April 1943, which fell after fighting on Hill 315 and Hill 299 on 3 May 1943. The division, now commanded by Major General Ernest N. Harmon, fought the Battle for Djebel Achtel between 5 and 11 May 1943 and entered Ferryville on 7 May 1943. With the British forces taking Tunis and Americans in Bizerte, the Axis forces in Tunisia surrendered between 9 and 13 May 1943. The division was reorganized in French Morocco and began arriving in Naples, Italy on 28 October 1943.

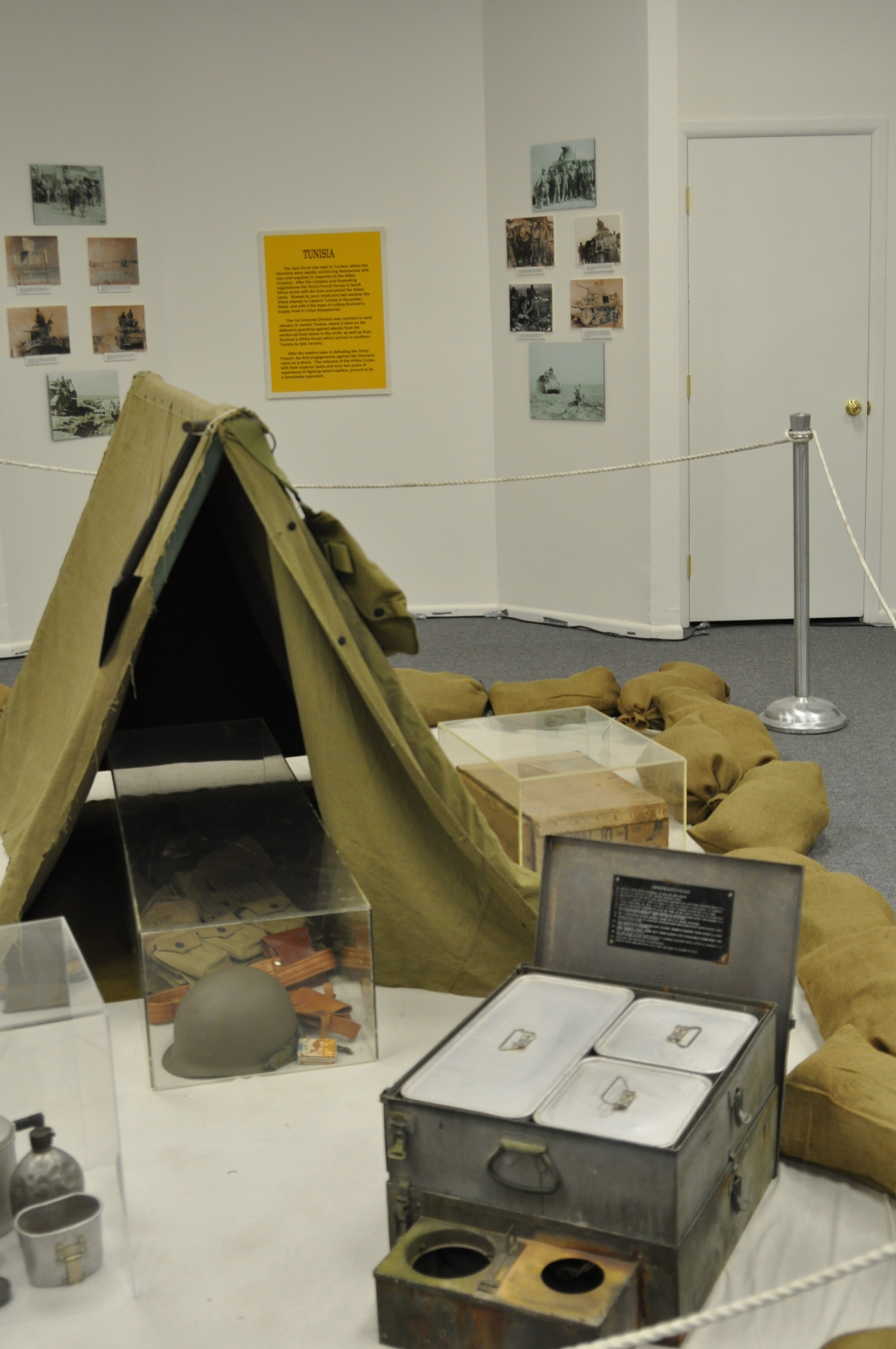
Exhibit at the 1st Armored Division and Fort Bliss museum depicts the type of bivouac site used in North Africa in WWII. Soldiers slept in cloth tents and carried chests of equipment and stoves.

After the Allied invasion of Sicily, the 1st Armored Division, which was part of the American Fifth Army, invaded mainland Italy. It participated in the attack on the Winter Line in November 1943, flanked the Axis armies in the landings at Anzio, and passed through the city of Rome and pursued the retreating enemy northward until mid-July 1944. At that point, Harmon was replaced by Major General Vernon Prichard, who led the 1st Armored for the rest of the war. Three days after Prichard took command, the division was reorganized based on experiences in the North Africa Campaign. The change was drastic: it eliminated the armored and infantry regiments in favor of three separate tank and infantry battalions, disbanded the Supply Battalion, and cut the strength of the division from 14,000 to 10,000. The result of the reorganization was a more flexible and balanced division, with roughly equivalent infantry and tank battalions. These forces could be combined or custom-tailored by the command to meet any situation. The additional infantry strength would prove particularly useful in future campaigns in the largely mountainous combat of the Italian campaign. The division continued in combat to the Po Valley until the German forces in Italy surrendered on 2 May 1945. In June, the division moved to Germany as part of the occupation forces.

==== Initial division organization ====
When the 1st Armored Division was formed on 15 July 1940 it was composed of the following units:

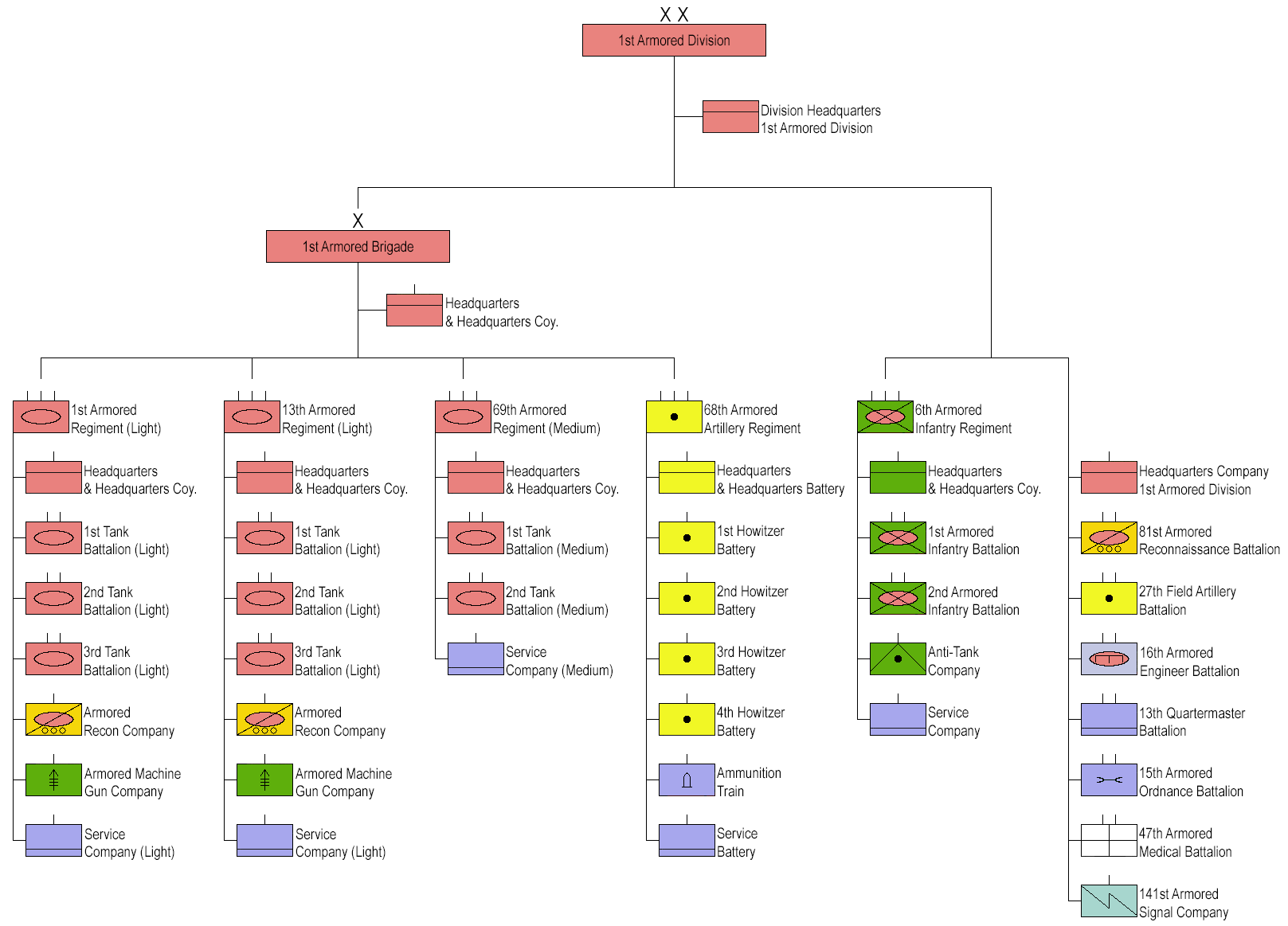
1st Armored Division initial organization (click to enlarge)

- 1st Armored Division
  - Division Headquarters
  - Headquarters Company, 1st Armored Division
  - 141st Armored Signal Company
  - 1st Armored Brigade (formed by reorganizing the 7th Cavalry Brigade (Mechanized))
    - Headquarters and Headquarters Company
    - 1st Armored Regiment (Light)
      - Headquarters and Headquarters Company
      - Armored Reconnaissance Company (M3 scout cars)
      - Armored Machine Gun Company (M2 half-track cars and M1919 .30-caliber machine guns)
      - Service Company (Light)
      - 3× Tank battalions (Light)
        - each battalion consists of: 1× Headquarters and Headquarters Platoon, 3× tank companies with M3 Stuart light tanks
    - 13th Armored Regiment (Light)
      - same organization as 1st Armored Regiment (Light)
    - 69th Armored Regiment (Medium) (transferred in February 1942 to the 6th Armored Division)
      - Headquarters and Headquarters Company
      - Service Company (Medium)
      - 2× Tank battalions (Medium)
        - each battalion consists of: 1× Headquarters and Headquarters Platoon, 3× tank companies with M3 Lee medium tanks
    - 68th Armored Field Artillery Regiment
      - Headquarters and Headquarters Battery
        - 4× Field artillery batteries (24× M2 105mm towed howitzers)
      - Ammunition Train
      - Service Battery
  - 6th Armored Infantry Regiment
    - Headquarters and Headquarters Company
    - 2× Armored infantry battalions
      - each battalion consists of: 1× Headquarters and Headquarters Platoon, 3× Rifle companies on M3 half-tracks, and 1× Heavy Weapons Company with M3 37mm Anti-Tank guns and M4 mortar carriers
    - Anti-Tank Company (M3 37mm Anti-Tank guns)
    - Service Company
  - 81st Armored Reconnaissance Battalion
    - Headquarters and Headquarters Detachment
    - 2× Armored reconnaissance companies (M3 scout cars)
    - Light Tank Company (M3 Stuart light tanks)
    - Armored Reconnaissance Rifle Company (M3 half-tracks)
  - 27th Field Artillery Battalion
    - Headquarters and Headquarters Battery
    - 3× Field artillery batteries (12× M2 105mm towed howitzers)
    - Anti-Tank Gun Battery (8× M1897 75mm anti-tank guns)
    - Service Battery
  - 16th Armored Engineer Battalion
    - Headquarters and Headquarters Company
    - 3× Armored engineer companies
    - Bridge Company
  - 13th Quartermaster Battalion
    - Headquarters and Headquarters Company
    - Quartermaster Truck Company
    - Light Maintenance Quartermaster Company
  - 15th Armored Ordnance Battalion
    - Headquarters and Headquarters Company
    - 2× Ordnance companies
  - 47th Armored Medical Battalion
    - Headquarters and Headquarters Detachment
    - Medical Collecting Company
    - Medical Clearing Company
    - Division Surgeon's Office

===== Heavy armored division =====
The Louisiana Maneuvers in August and September 1941 had a profound impact on the organization of US armored division. The exercises exposed that the existing armored divisions were too heavy in armor and too light in infantry and artillery. Additionally the divisions lacked the resources to organize combat teams, while the armored brigade complicated the command channel. It was also found that the division's service elements needed greater control. As a result the Table of Organization of armored divisions was radically reorganized: the armored brigade headquarter was eliminated. The number of armored regiments was reduced from three to two, and the two remaining armored regiments were reorganized to consist of one light and two medium tank battalions each. Three self-propelled 105mm howitzer battalions replaced the armored artillery regiment and field artillery battalion, and control of the artillery passed to an artillery section in the division headquarters. The armored infantry regiment was reorganized to consist of three battalions of three companies each. The engineer battalion added a fourth engineer company. Each divisions also formed two combat command headquarters, which did not have assigned units, but allowed the division commander to assemble combat teams as required. The quartermaster battalion was replaced by a supply battalion, while the ordnance battalion added a third ordnance maintenance company. For better control of the division's service elements, division trains were added. To support the division headquarters company a service company was formed, which provided transportation and supplies, and included the division's military police platoon.

After the reorganization the 1st Armored Division was composed of the following units:

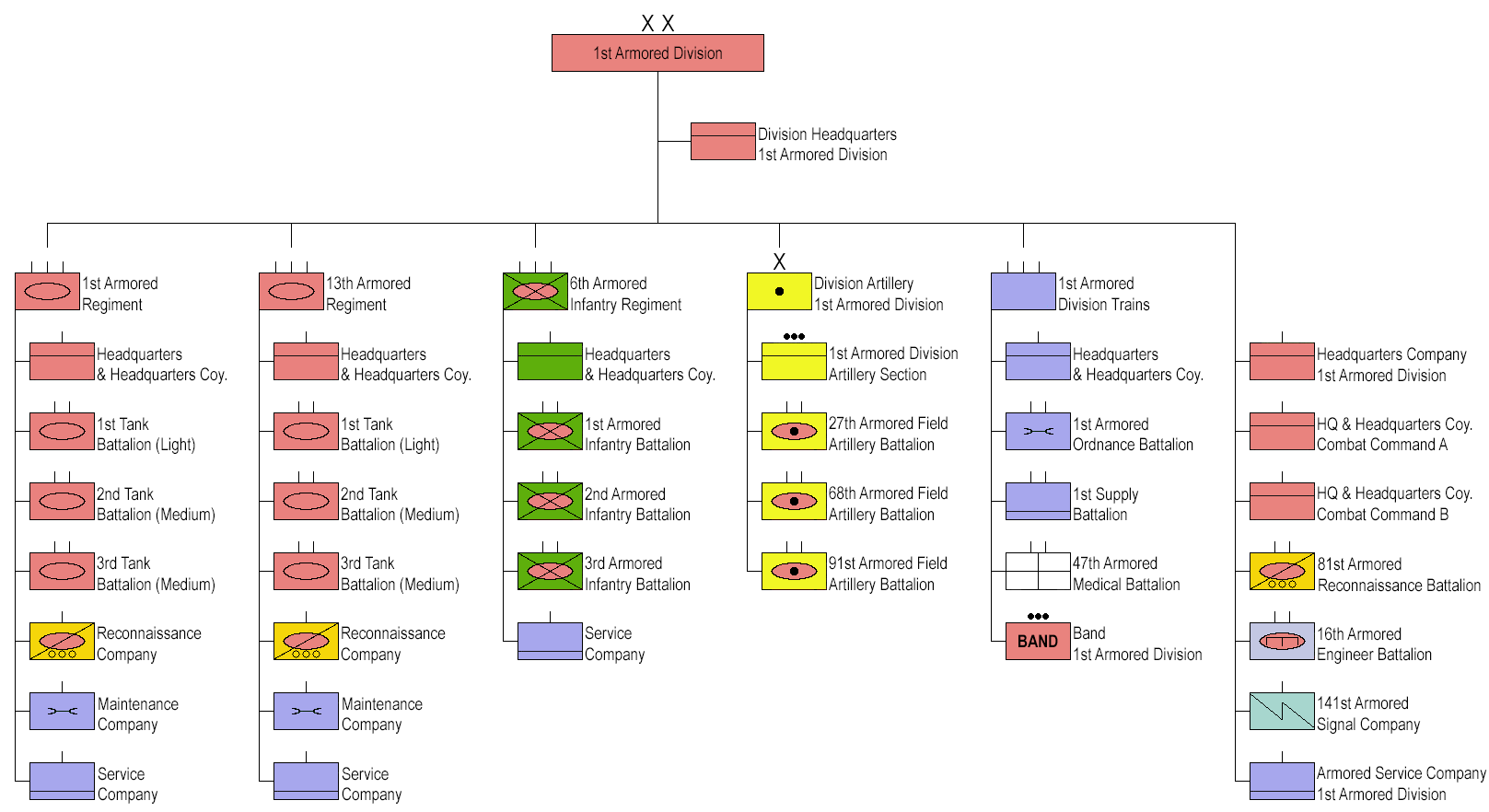
1st Armored Division organization as a heavy armored division (click to enlarge)

- 1st Armored Division
  - Division Headquarters
  - Headquarters Company, 1st Armored Division
  - Headquarters and Headquarters Company, Combat Command A
  - Headquarters and Headquarters Company, Combat Command B
  - 141st Armored Signal Company
  - Armored Service Company (includes the division's Military Police Platoon)
  - 1st Armored Regiment
    - Headquarters and Headquarters Company
    - Reconnaissance Company (M3 scout cars and T30 HMC self propelled guns)
    - Maintenance Company
    - Service Company
    - 1st Tank Battalion (Light)
      - Headquarters and Headquarters Company
      - 3× Light Tank companies (A, B, C) (M3/M5 Stuart light tanks)
    - 2nd Tank Battalion (Medium)
      - Headquarters and Headquarters Company
      - 3× Medium Tank companies (D, E, F) (M4 Sherman tanks)
    - 3rd Tank Battalion (Medium)
      - Headquarters and Headquarters Company
      - 3× Medium Tank companies (G, H, I) (M4 Sherman tanks)
  - 13th Armored Regiment
    - same organization as 1st Armored Regiment
  - 6th Armored Infantry Regiment
    - Headquarters and Headquarters Company
    - 3× Armored infantry battalions
      - each battalion consists of: 1× Headquarters and Headquarters Company, 3× Rifle companies on M3 half-tracks
    - Service Company
  - 81st Armored Reconnaissance Battalion
    - Headquarters and Headquarters Company
    - 3× Reconnaissance companies (M3 scout cars)
    - Light Tank Company (M3/M5 Stuart)
  - 16th Armored Engineer Battalion
    - Headquarters and Headquarters Company
    - 4× Armored engineer companies
    - Bridge Company
  - 1st Armored Division Artillery
    - 1st Armored Division Artillery Section
    - 27th Armored Field Artillery Battalion
      - Headquarters and Headquarters Battery
      - 3× Field artillery batteries (M7 Priest self propelled howitzers)
      - Service Company
    - 68th Armored Field Artillery Battalion
      - same organization as 27th Armored Field Artillery Battalion
    - 91st Armored Field Artillery Battalion
      - same organization as 27th Armored Field Artillery Battalion
  - 1st Armored Division Trains
    - Headquarters and Headquarters Company
    - 1st Armored Ordnance Battalion
      - Headquarters and Headquarters Company
      - 3× Maintenance companies
    - 1st Supply Battalion
      - Headquarters and Headquarters Company
      - 2× Truck companies
    - 47th Armored Medical Battalion
      - Headquarters and Headquarters Company
      - 3× Medical companies
    - 1st Armored Division Band

===== Light armored division =====
Early in 1943, the Army Ground Force began a series of studies to reorganize the various divisions within the Army. After reviewing the tables of organization and after allowing the various commands to review and comment on the proposed restructure, the War Department published on 15 September 1943 a new armored division tables of organization. The restructuring removed the two armored regiments and armored infantry regiment from the table of organization and replaced them with three tank battalions and three armored infantry battalions. Each tank battalion included one light and three medium tank companies. Both Combat Commands, A and B, remained, but an additional Reserve Command was added to the organization. This was a small headquarters element of 10 personnel tasked to clarify command and control in the division's rear area. Armored engineer battalions lost their bridge companies, while their engineer companies were reduced from four to three. The division's cavalry reconnaissance squadron was increased in size to include an HQ Troop, four reconnaissance troops, a light tank company, and an assault gun troop of four platoons (one for each reconnaissance troop). Within the division trains, the division lost its supply battalion and the division's armored service company. These changes pared the division's strength from 14,630 men to 10,937, slashed the number of tanks from 360 to 263, reduced the variety of vehicles to ease repair problems, and eliminated the maintenance-prone motorcycles.

After its reorganization as a light armored division the 1st Armored Division was composed of the following units:

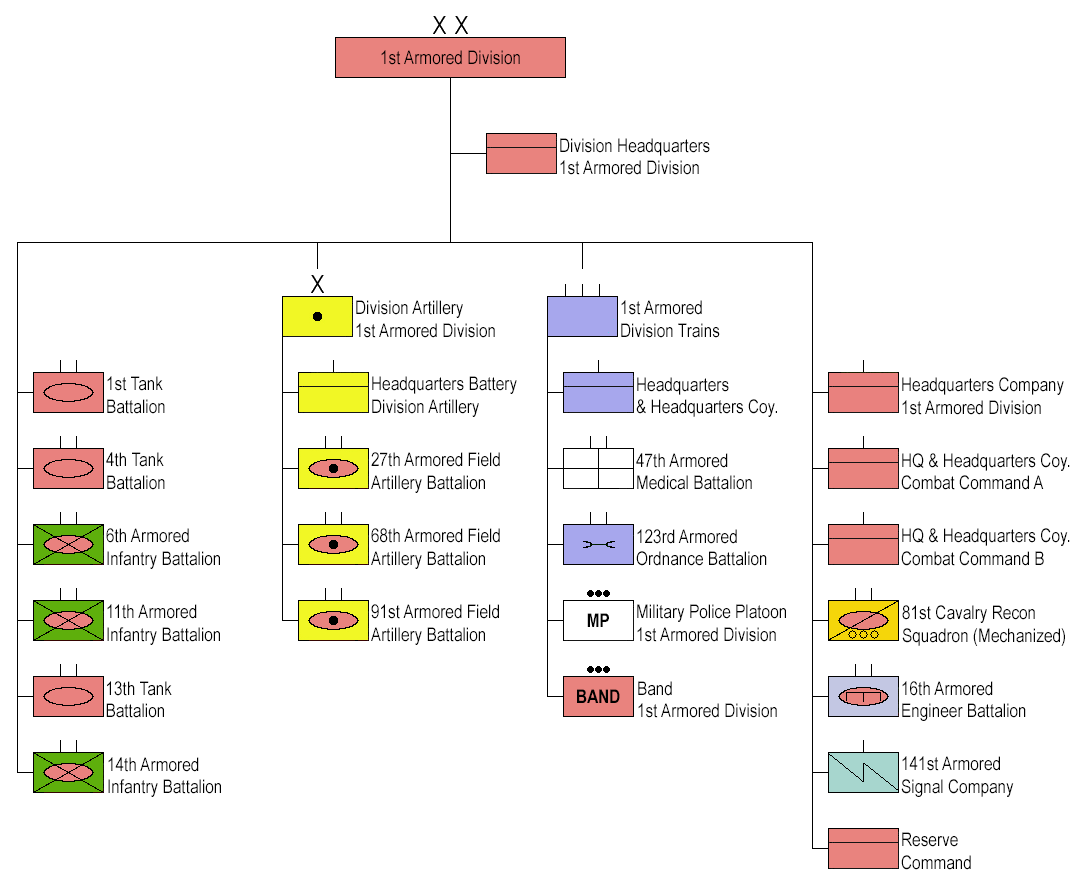
1st Armored Division organization as a light armored division (click to enlarge)

- 1st Armored Division
  - Division Headquarters
  - Headquarters Company, 1st Armored Division
  - Headquarters and Headquarters Company, Combat Command A
  - Headquarters and Headquarters Company, Combat Command B
  - 141st Armored Signal Company
  - Reserve Command
  - 1st Tank Battalion
    - Headquarters and Headquarters Company
    - 3× Medium Tank companies (M4 Sherman tanks)
    - Light Tank Company (M3/M5 Stuart or M24 Chaffee light tanks)
    - Service Company
  - 4th Tank Battalion
    - same organization as 1st Tank Battalion
  - 13th Tank Battalion
    - same organization as 1st Tank Battalion
  - 6th Armored Infantry Battalion
    - Headquarters and Headquarters Company
    - 3× Rifle companies (M3 half-tracks)
    - Service Company
  - 11th Armored Infantry Battalion
    - same organization as 6th Armored Infantry Battalion
  - 14th Armored Infantry Battalion
    - same organization as 6th Armored Infantry Battalion
  - 81st Cavalry Reconnaissance Squadron (Mechanized)
    - Headquarters and Headquarters and Service Troop
    - 4× Cavalry reconnaissance troops (M8 Greyhound armored cars)
    - Cavalry Assault Gun Troop (M8 Scott self propelled guns)
    - Light Tank Company (M3/M5 Stuart or M24 Chaffee light tanks)
  - 16th Armored Engineer Battalion
    - Headquarters and Headquarters Company
    - 3× Armored engineer companies
  - 1st Armored Division Artillery
    - Headquarters and Headquarters Battery
    - 27th Armored Field Artillery Battalion
      - Headquarters and Headquarters Battery
      - 3× Field artillery batteries (M7 Priest self propelled howitzers)
      - Service Battery
    - 68th Armored Field Artillery Battalion
      - same organization as 27th Armored Field Artillery Battalion
    - 91st Armored Field Artillery Battalion
      - same organization as 27th Armored Field Artillery Battalion
  - 1st Armored Division Trains
    - Headquarters and Headquarters Company
    - 47th Armored Medical Battalion
      - Headquarters and Headquarters Company
      - 3× Medical companies
    - 123rd Armored Ordnance Battalion
      - Headquarters and Headquarters Company
      - 3× Maintenance companies
    - Military Police Platoon
    - 1st Armored Division Band

==== Casualties ====
- Total battle casualties: 7,096
- Killed in action: 1,194
- Wounded in action: 5,168
- Missing in action: 216
- Prisoner of war: 518

During the war, the Old Ironsides division captured 41 towns and cities and 108,740 prisoners. 722 division soldiers were awarded the Silver Star and another 908 received the Bronze Star Medal. The division received 5,478 Purple Hearts. Two division soldiers were awarded the Medal of Honor during World War II: Private Nicholas Minue and Second Lieutenant Thomas Weldon Fowler.

The 1st Armored Division flag returned to the New York Port of Embarkation on 24 April 1946 and was deactivated at Camp Kilmer, New Jersey on 25 April 1946. The component headquarters and units which remained in Germany were retasked and renamed as a component of the United States Constabulary.

=== Cold War ===
As part of the Korean War buildup of American forces, the 1st Armored Division was reactivated at Fort Hood, Texas on 7 March 1951. The division became one of the first divisions in the Army to integrate black soldiers throughout the ranks, and was also the only combat-ready armored division in the continental United States and the first to receive the M48 Patton tank. Training for nuclear war became a major theme in the mid-1950s. The 1st Armored Division participated in tests of the "Atomic Field Army" at Fort Hood and in Operation Sagebrush, the largest joint maneuver conducted since World War II. The 1st Armored Division moved to its new base of operations at Fort Polk, Louisiana after completing the exercise in February 1956.

==== Cuba ====
At the end of the 1950s, the Army's focus on a nuclear battlefield waned and it experienced years of reduced budgets. The 1st Armored Division reverted into a training cadre for new inductees after being reduced in size and moved back to Fort Hood.

In 1962, the 1st Armored Division was brought back to full strength and reorganized. Brigades replaced combat commands and the division's aviation assets doubled. Intense training followed the reorganization. In October 1962 the 1st Armored Division was declared combat-ready just before the Cuban Missile Crisis. The division deployed from Fort Hood, Texas to Fort Stewart in response to the Soviet stationing of missiles in Cuba. The entire operation took 18 days.

In the following six weeks, the 1st Armored Division conducted live-fire training and amphibious exercises on the Georgia and Florida coasts. One highlight was a visit from President John F. Kennedy on 26 November 1962. Shortly thereafter, tensions eased and the division returned to Ft. Hood.

==== Vietnam ====
Although the 1st Armored Division did not participate as a division in the Vietnam War, there were two units, Company A, 501st Aviation and 1st Squadron, 1st Cavalry Regiment, that served in Vietnam. Both earned Presidential Unit Citations, and 1-1 Cavalry received two Valorous Unit Awards and three Vietnamese Crosses of Gallantry. Neither unit was officially detached from the 1st Armored Division thus veterans of both units may wear the division's patch as a combat patch. In 1967 the 198th Infantry Brigade was formed from three of the division's infantry battalions and deployed from Fort Hood to Vietnam. After the war, two of the three battalions, 1-6 Infantry and 1-52 Infantry, returned to the 1st Armored Division.

In early April 1968, when rioting broke out in many American cities following the assassination of Martin Luther King Jr., the 3rd Brigade was deployed on 6 April to assist in restoring order during rioting in Chicago.

==== West Germany ====
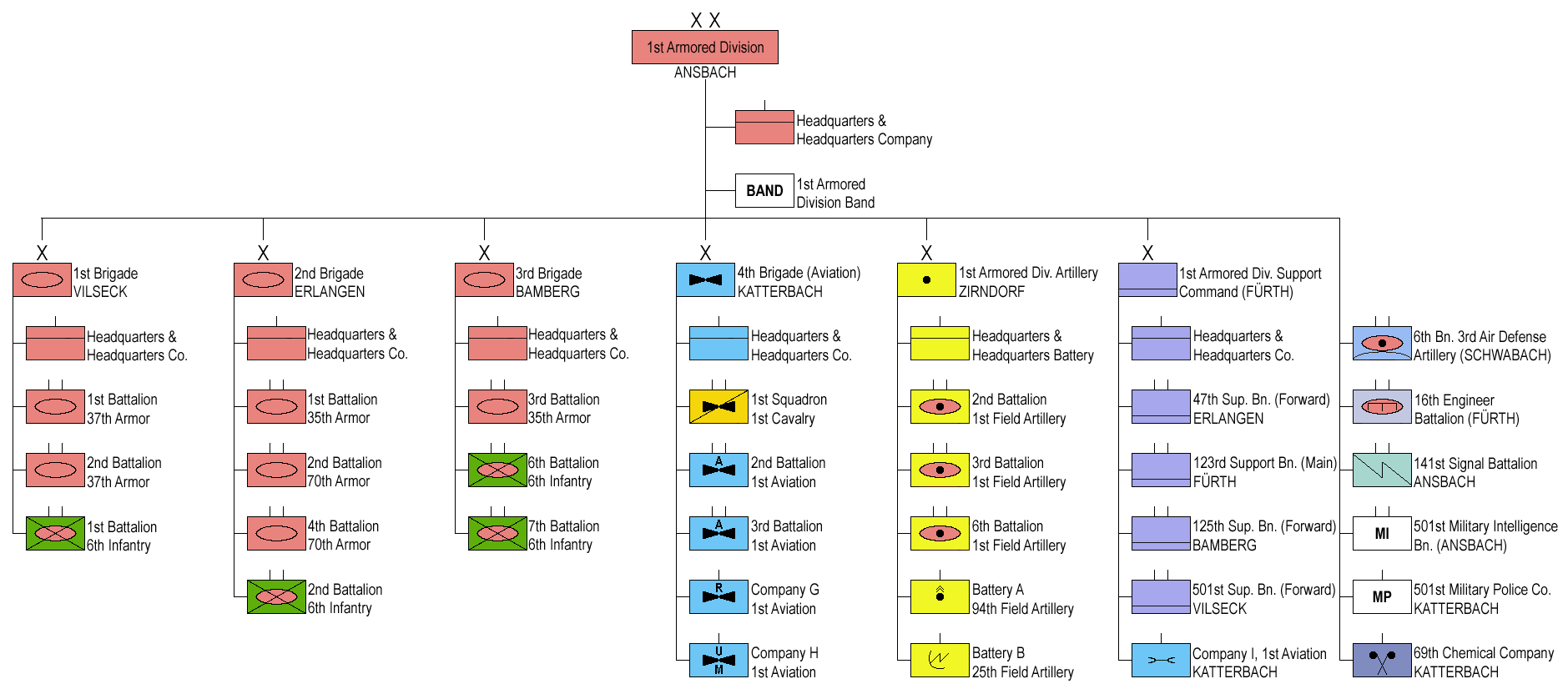
1st Armored Division structure 1989 (click to enlarge)

In the early 1970s, American forces withdrew from Vietnam and the Army was heavily restructured. The 1st Armored Division was rumored to be on the list of units to be deactivated. Veterans of the division organized a letter-writing campaign to "save" the 1st Armored Division.

As part of the Army's post-Vietnam reorganization, the 1st Armored Division was moved to West Germany in 1971 and replaced the 4th Armored Division in the Bavarian city of Ansbach. The Division headquarters remained in Ansbach, with brigade units in the neighboring towns of Bamberg, Illesheim, Fürth (Nuremberg), Schwabach, Katterbach, Crailsheim, Erlangen and Zirndorf for the next twenty years, as part of VII Corps, itself part of NATO's Central Army Group.

1st Battalion, 51st Infantry (Mech), at Crailsheim, part of the 1st Brigade, was deactivated on 16 June 1984 as a result of the division's conversion to the Division 86 force structure. Under the Division 86 structure, each heavy division decreased by one infantry battalion, while remaining infantry battalions gained one additional rifle company.

On 16 April 1986, the Aviation Brigade, 1st Armored Division, was activated in Germany.

In April 1987, 6th Battalion, 43rd Air Defense Artillery (Patriot) moved to a newly built Urlas Kaserne (located near Bismarck & Katterbach Kaserne) assigned to the 1st Armored Division.

On 16 November 1987, the 501st Combat Aviation Battalion was deactivated and re-flagged as 2nd Battalion, 1st Aviation Regiment at Katterbach Kaserne, Federal Republic of Germany, under the 1st Armored Division.

=== Persian Gulf War ===
In August 1990, Iraq invaded Kuwait. On 8 November 1990, the 1st Armored Division was alerted for deployment to the Middle East to provide an offensive option should Saddam refuse to withdraw from Kuwait. This alert changed the division's focus, from "building down" in Europe to "building up" in Southwest Asia.

Division leaders and soldiers began focusing on planning, training and unit deployment. Planning focused on the challenge of logistics, as the division had to be shipped to Saudi Arabia in a logical order to support the buildup for combat operations.

Commanders and their staff rapidly integrated new equipment into their units to be deployed to the Persian Gulf region. The division also prepared to receive new units: 3rd Brigade, 3rd Infantry Division replaced 1st Brigade, 1st Armored Division. Round-out units such as the 312th Support Center Rear Area Operations Center (RAOC) composed of Reservists from throughout Germany, also joined the division. Other units, such as the 19th and 54th Engineer Battalions, the 218th Military Police Company, and the 7th Support Group, joined the 1st Armored Division in Kuwait.

Units concentrated on preparing vehicles for overseas movement while undergoing individual and unit training, including gunnery, in the few weeks available before deployment. The division qualified 355 tanks and 300 Bradley crews on Tables VII and VIII, conducted division artillery howitzer section gunnery, fired modified Vulcan Table VIII and qualified Stinger and Chaparral crews. Battle drill rehearsals and wargaming seminars were also part of the rigorous training agenda.

The division transported equipment by rail, wheeled convoy, and rotary-wing self-deployment. These movements unavoidably occurred on short notice or in bad weather, and posed challenges to coordination and logistics. The first trains departed for port the last week of November 1990 and continued to so until the second week of December 1990. Within two months 17,400 soldiers and 7,050 pieces of equipment were moved to Saudi Arabia for Operation Desert Shield/Storm.

==== Battle damage assessment ====
- 25 Feb: 2 tanks, 25 Armored Personnel Carriers (APCs), 9 artillery pieces, 14 Air Defense Artillery (ADA) systems, 48 trucks, 314 Enemy Prisoner of War (EPW)
- 26 Feb: 112 tanks, 82 APCs, 2 artillery pieces, 2 ADA systems, 94 trucks, 545 EPW
- 27 Feb: 186 tanks, 127 APCs, 66 artillery pieces, 5 ADA systems, 118 trucks, 839 EPW
- 28 Feb: 41 tanks, 60 APCs, 15 artillery pieces, 11 ADA systems, 244 trucks, 281 EPW
- 1–12 Mar: 99 tanks, 191 APCs, 98 artillery pieces, 105 ADA systems, 879 trucks, 4,707 EPW
- Total: 440 tanks, 485 APCs, 190 artillery pieces, 137 ADA systems, 1,383 trucks, 6,686 EPW

Four division soldiers were killed in action and 52 wounded in action during the Gulf War

=== The Balkans ===
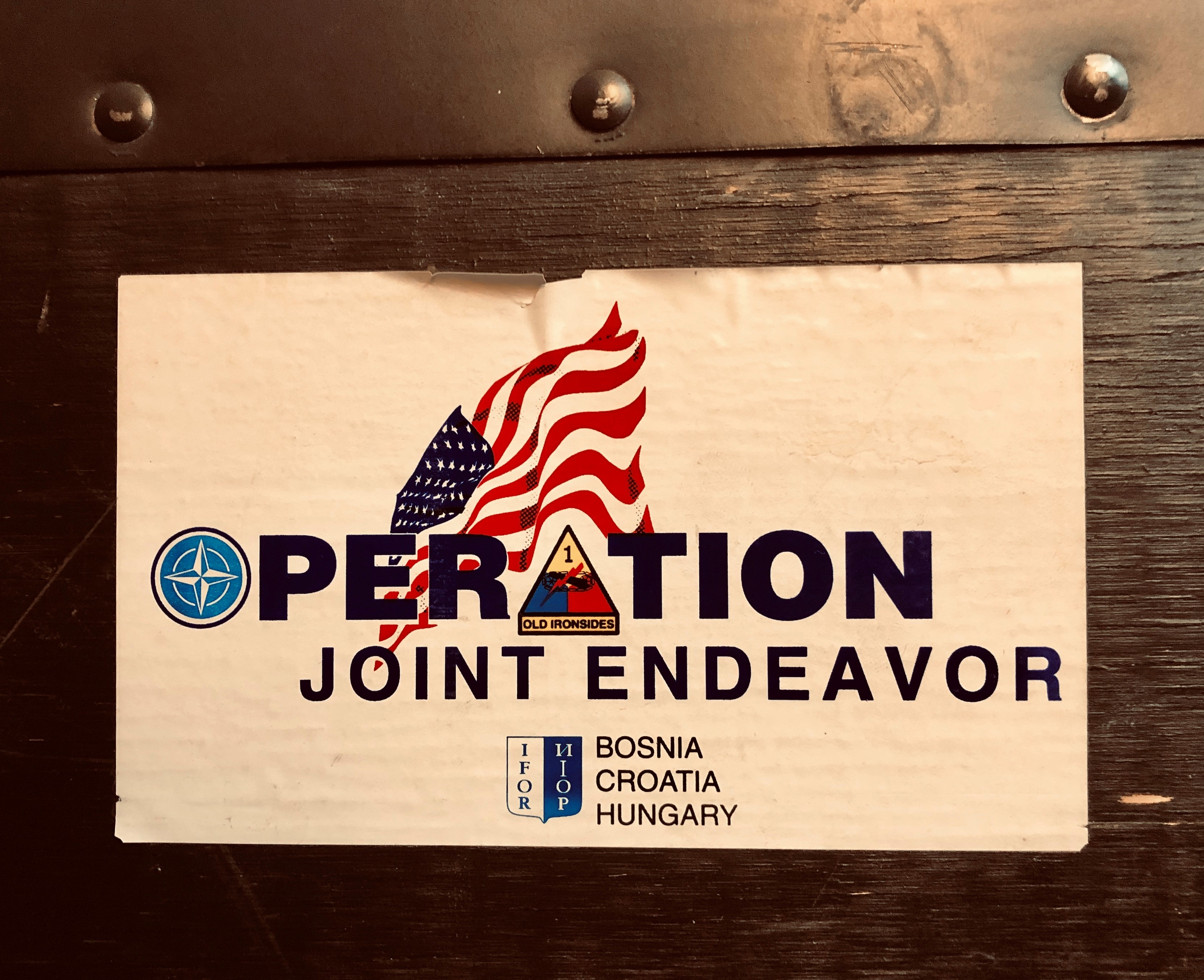
Sticker Handed out to Division Staff prior to Mountain Eagle 1995

On 18 December 1995, under the command of Major General William L. Nash, the division deployed to northeastern Bosnia as the command and major troop contributing element of Task Force Eagle, a peace enforcement, multinational unit. The 1st Armored Division returned in late 1996 to Germany.

In 1999, the unit deployed to Kosovo for Operation Allied Force and Operation Joint Guardian. The unit trained heavily afterwards in the Hohenfels and Grafenwöhr Training Areas in Germany, with realistic Opposing Force (OPFOR) exercises.

In 2000, the 1st Armored Division's 1st Brigade Combat Team trained at the Grafenwoehr Training Area (GTA). In February 2000, 1st Armored Division Headquarters announced the closure of military facilities in Bad Kreuznach and its subsequent move to Wiesbaden scheduled for June 2001. The 1st Armored Division trained at HTA and GTA in three separate exercises in March 2001. Ready First participated in Mountain Guardian III at Hohenfels as a mission rehearsal exercise for Kosovo.

The Division's command and control elements conducted a warfighter exercise in the GTA between 21 March and 17 April 2001. It then took command of Task Force Falcon in Kosovo as Brigadier General Randal Tieszen accepted the colors from 1st Infantry Division's Brigadier General Ricardo Sanchez. The Division celebrated its 60th birthday at home and abroad in Kosovo on 15 July 2001. Major General George W. Casey, Jr. traveled to Boston Harbor in August 2001, where he connected with Commander Bill Foster of the historic warship USS Constitution.

=== Afghanistan and Iraq ===
==== Iraq ====
In the months building up to the March 2003 invasion of Iraq, two battalions of the 1st Armored Division's 3rd Brigade were deployed to support Operation Iraqi Freedom. The 2–70 Armor and 1–41 Infantry battalion task forces augmented the 82nd Airborne Division, the 3rd Infantry Division, and the 101st Airborne Division throughout the campaign to oust Iraqi dictator Saddam Hussein. These units spearheaded the U.S. assaults in As Samawah and Karbala and later occupied the southern area of Baghdad. The 1st Battalion, 13th Armor followed shortly behind towards the end of March 2003.

In May 2003, the division deployed to Iraq and assumed responsibility for Baghdad, under command of Major General Ricardo Sanchez, relieving the 3d Infantry Division. The 1st Brigade, under Colonel Michael S. Tucker and after July 2003 under Colonel Peter Mansoor, assumed responsibility for the Rusafa and Adhamiya districts of central Baghdad. The division was scheduled to return to Germany in April 2004 but was extended in country an additional 3 months in order to oppose an uprising of Shia militia led by Moqtada Al Sadr. During the extension Task Force 1–37 Armor ("Bandits") fought Sadr's forces in Karbala while Task Force 2–37 Armor ("Dukes") along with elements of 2–3 Field Artillery ("Gunners") fought in Diwaniya, Sadr City, Al-Kut, and Najaf. Task Force 1–36 Infantry ("Spartans") became the Combined Joint Task Force 7 Operational Reserve and conducted operations along Route Irish from Baghdad International Airport to the Green Zone in support of the 1st Cavalry Division. Forces from the 2d Brigade fought in Kut. During its 15-month deployment, the division lost 133 soldiers.

===== Ready First =====
The division's 1st Brigade deployed again to Iraq in January 2006 under the command of Colonel Sean B. MacFarland after months of intensive training in Grafenwöhr and Hohenfels, Germany. Many of the soldiers who fought with units like 1–36 Infantry ("Spartans"), 2–37 Armor ("Iron Dukes"), and 1–37 ("Bandits") during the invasion of Iraq returned for a second tour. Most of the 1st BCT was initially deployed to Northern Iraq in Nineveh province concentrating on the city of Tal' Afar. In May 2006, the main force of the 1st Brigade received orders to move south to the city of Ramadi in volatile Al Anbar Province.

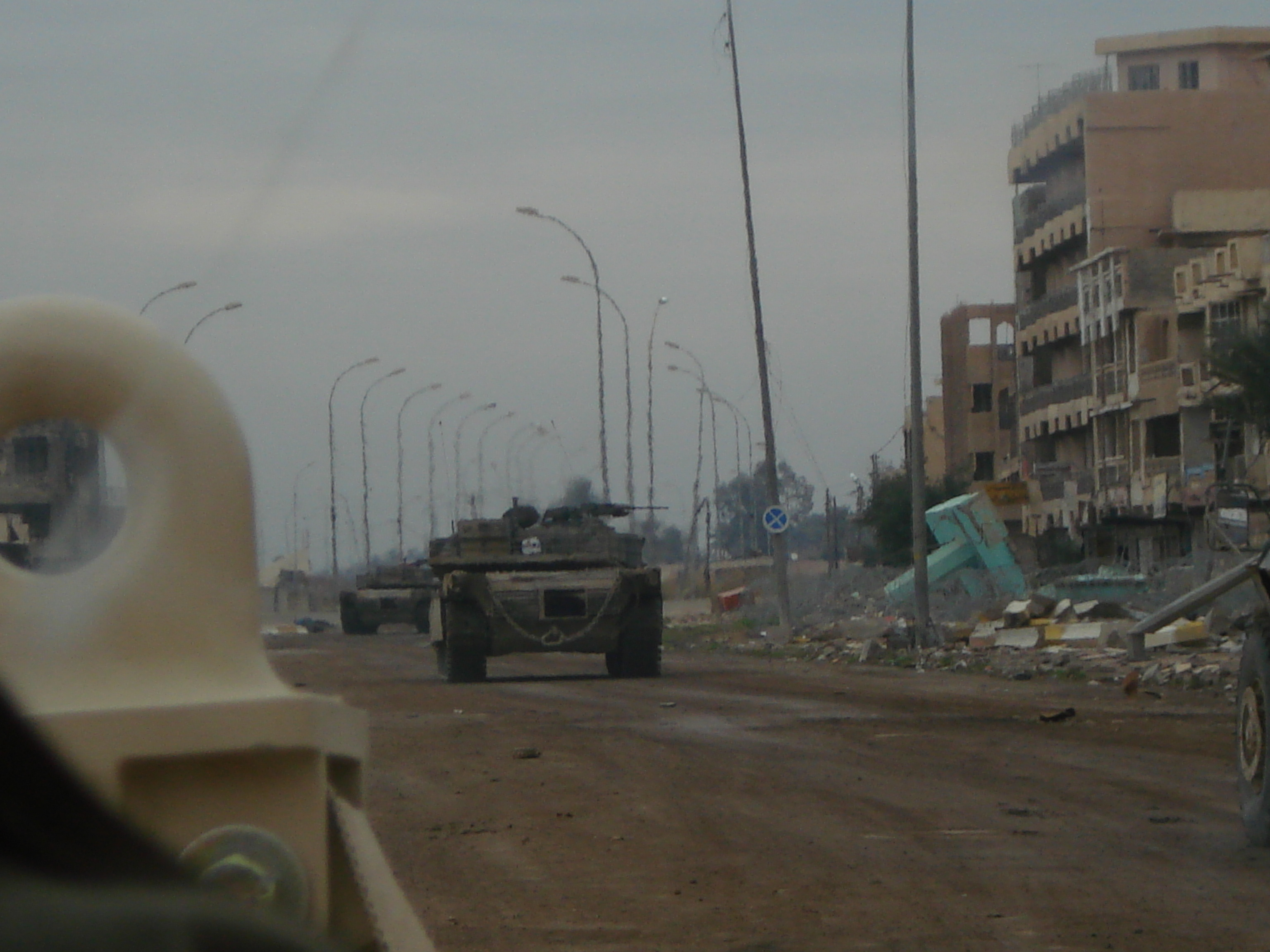
1st BCT employed tanks in the city of Ramadi to push out Al Qaeda in Iraq.

Since 2003, Al Anbar served as a base of operations for the Sunni insurgency and al Qaeda. Ramadi, its capital, had neither a government nor a police force when the brigade arrived. Most military strategists inside and outside of the Bush administration believed that the war in Anbar had already concluded unsuccessfully. Al Qaeda in Iraq publicly announced Ramadi as the capital of their new caliphate and the city alone averaged more than twenty attacks per day; the province was statistically the most dangerous location in the country, and the insurgency enjoyed free rein throughout much of the province.

===== Ramadi =====
When the 1st Brigade arrived in Ramadi in June 2006 with more than 70 M1 Abrams tanks and 84 Bradley Fighting Vehicles, many locals believed the brigade was preparing for a Fallujah-style block-by-block clearing assault on the city and many insurgents fled the city. Following Colonel H.R. McMaster's "Clear, Hold, Build" strategy, the brigade developed a plan to isolate the insurgents, deny them sanctuary, and build Iraqi security forces.

The 1st Brigade moved into some of Ramadi's dangerous neighborhoods and built four of what would eventually become eighteen combat outposts starting in July 2006. The soldiers brought the territory under control and inflicted many casualties on the insurgents. On 24 July, the Al-Qaeda in Iraq (AQI) launched a counterattack, initiating 24 assaults, each with about 100 fighters, on American positions. The insurgents failed in all of their attacks and lost about 30 men.

===== Independence Day =====
Simultaneous with combat operations, the brigade worked on the "hold" portion of clear, hold, build. Lieutenant Colonel Tony Deane, commander of Task Force 1-35 Armor, approached Sheik Abdul Sattar Bezia al-Rishawi of the Abu Risha tribe in an attempt to recruit his tribesmen to the police force.

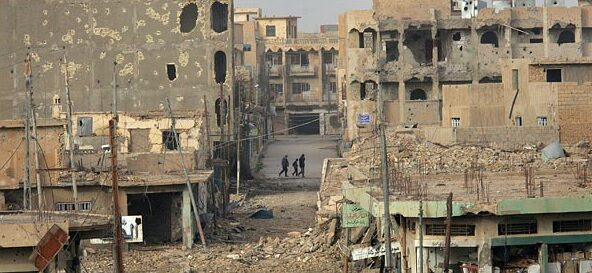
Downtown Ramadi in 2006

In his book A Chance in Hell that focuses on the operation in Al Anbar, Jim Michaels wrote that the US had a flawed view on civil government which ignored the tribal history of Iraq. "The tribal system embraced elements of democracy. The sheik may not be elected," wrote Michaels," but nor is he born into his job. Sheiks are generally selected by a group of elders[...] Throughout history, ignoring the tribes [in Iraq] has never been a smart move. Sheiks have wielded power for thousands of years and survived countless efforts to blunt their influence in the name of modernity."

To facilitate Sheik Sittar, Colonel MacFarland's deputy, Lieutenant Colonel Jim Lechner, and his police implementation officer, Marine Major Teddy Gates, changed the location for Iraqi Police (IP) recruiting. They wanted a more secure location close to Sattar's house, as this would enable them to build a police station north of the Euphrates River in an area where many potential recruits lived. Having already had his father and three brothers killed by AQI, Sattar appreciated the idea. The residents' response was overwhelming by standing in line to serve as IPs at the next recruiting drive.

In August, the new Jazeera police station north of the river, manned mostly by Abu Ali Jassim tribe members, was attacked and the sheikh of the tribe was killed. AQI hid the sheikh's body so it was not found for several days, a violation of Islam's strict burial rules that call for interment within 24 hours.

The attack on the station killed several IPs and created many burn casualties. MacFarland offered to evacuate the police to Camp Blue Diamond, an American Army camp outside of Ramadi, while they repaired the station. But the Iraqis refused to abandon their post and instead put their flag back up and resumed patrolling that same day.

===== Awakening =====
With the locals outraged by AQI's disregard of Islamic funeral laws, the charismatic Sattar stepped forward to continue the push toward working with the Americans. On 9 September 2006, he organized a tribal council, attended by more than 50 sheiks as well as MacFarland, where he officially declared an "Anbar Awakening". It would convene an Awakening Council dedicated to driving the AQI out of Ramadi and establish rule of law and local governance. The Anbar Awakening was realized with Sittar as its leader. McFarland, speaking later about the meeting, said, "I told them that I now knew what it was like to be in Independence Hall on 4 July 1776 when the Declaration of Independence was signed." While attacks remained high through October 2006, the Awakening and Sittar's influence began to spread. The AQI, realized it was losing its influence over the citizens and launched a counterattack on the Sufia tribal area on 25 November. The attack was intended to terrorize and insult the Sufia tribe, though with the 1st BCT's M1A1 tanks reinforcing tribal defenders, the AQI was repelled and the relationship between the Sufia tribe and the 1st Armored Division improved.

By early 2007, the combination of tribal engagement and combat outposts was defeating AQI's in Ramadi and throughout the province. President George W. Bush, in his 23 January 2007 State of the Union speech referred to Al Anbar as a place "where al Qaeda terrorists have gathered and local forces have begun showing a willingness to fight them."

===== "The Gettysburg of this war" =====
By February 2007, contact with insurgents dropped almost 70 percent in number since June 2006 as well as decreasing in complexity and effect. By the summer of 2007, fighting in Al Anbar was mostly over. Frederick Kagan, resident scholar at the American Enterprise Institute, called Al Anbar "the Gettysburg of this war, to the extent that counterinsurgencies can have such turning points," writing "Progress in Anbar and throughout the Sunni community has depended heavily on a skillful balance between military force and political efforts at the local level."

The tactics, techniques, and procedures used by 1st BCT were groundbreaking at the time but came to serve as the philosophical basis for the surge in Iraq. In nine months, 85 soldiers, sailors, and Marines were killed, and over 500 were wounded.

===== Division Headquarters redeploys =====
In September 2007, amid a national debate about troop levels in Iraq and, more broadly, about the US strategy in Iraq, the 1st Armored Division Headquarters was re-deployed to Iraq. General David Petraeus' surge strategy was in effect, with major counterinsurgency operations across the country. "This is a pivotal and historic time for the 1st AD, for the forces in Iraq and for the nation," said Brig. Gen. James C. Boozer, a deputy commanding general for 1st AD at the time of the division's deployment. The division began its deployment the same day Petraeus delivered his Report to Congress on the Situation in Iraq, concluding that "the military objectives of the surge are, in large measure, being met."

The division, commanded by then-Major General Mark Hertling, conducted a relief in place with the 25th Infantry Division and assumed command of Multi-National Division North, headquartered in Tikrit, Iraq, on 28 October 2007, just as MacFarland's Anbar Awakening was pushing AQI out of Anbar. At the time in northern Iraq, enemy attacks averaged 1,800 a month, the Iraqis had little trust in their central government, and the unemployment rate was high.

Hertling assumed responsibility for all Coalition forces in Northern Iraq. Multi-National Division North was composed of five maneuver brigade combat teams, a combat aviation brigade, a fires brigade, and an engineer brigade. The division had responsibility includes the Iraqi provinces of Ninawa, Kirkuk (formerly at Tamin), Salah ad Din, and Diyala along with Dahuk, and As Sulaymaniyah. The area included the critical cities of Tal Afar, Mosul, Bayji, Tikrit, Kirkuk, Samarra, Balad, Baqubah, Dahuk, and Sulaymaniah. Arbil province remained aligned as a separate Multi-National Division, North-East. The division area of operations included ethnic fault lines between Arabs and Kurds, religious fault lines between Sunni and Shia Muslims, numerous tribal regions, and the complexities involving significant former regime elements.

The 1st Armored Division immediately applied a mix of lethal and non-lethal counterinsurgency tactics, as maneuver battalions partnered with State Department officials and provincial reconstruction teams. Commanders applied a focused lethality, protecting the Iraqi population while killing insurgents in large volumes.

The division transferred responsibility to Headquarters 25th Infantry Division on 8 December 2008 and returned to Wiesbaden Army Airfield (later renamed Lucius D. Clay Kaserne) in Germany.

On 17 April 2013, US Secretary of Defense Chuck Hagel announced the deployment of elements of the 1st Armored Division headquarters to Jordan in response to the crisis in Syria. The elements from the 1st Armored Division joined forces in Jordan and provided command and control in cooperation with Jordan forces, which was used to establish a joint task force headquarters that provided command and control for chemical weapons response, humanitarian assistance efforts, and stability operations. The 1st Armored Division planners in Jordan are facilitating the exchange of information with the Jordanian Armed Forces.

==== Move to Fort Bliss ====
In 2005, the Base Realignment and Closure (BRAC) commission decided to move the 1st Armored Division to Fort Bliss, Texas no later than 2012. As part of then Army-wide transformation, several division units were deactivated or converted to other units. The 1st Armored Division officially uncased its colors at Fort Bliss on 13 May 2011.

- 1st Brigade: The 1st Brigade, 1st Armored Division cased its colors at Friedberg, Germany on 20 April 2007, ending 62 years of military presence in Germany. 1st Brigade reactivated and uncased its colors on 27 October 2008. and began reconfiguring as a Stryker Brigade Combat Team (SBCT) after redeployment from Iraq in November 2010. Denoted 1-1AD "Ready First", the 1st BCT, 1st Armored Division deployed to Afghanistan in December 2012. The first female engagement team to deploy from Fort Bliss was trained in 2012 before Secretary of Defense Leon Panetta's order rescinding restrictions on women in combat roles. "Ready First" Brigade converted from a Stryker BCT to an Armored Brigade Combat Team (ABCT) 20 June 2019.
- 2nd Brigade: 2nd Brigade, 1st Armored Division in Baumholder, Germany, remained assigned to USAREUR until 15 July 2009, when it was reflagged as the separate 170th Infantry Brigade. As part of the Grow the Army Plan announced on 19 December 2007, the 170th was one of two infantry brigades to be activated and retained in Germany until 2012 and 2013. (The other brigade is the 172nd Infantry Brigade in Schweinfurt, Germany, which reflagged from 2nd Brigade, 1st Infantry Division on 16 March 2008.) In 2010, the U.S. Army attached the 2nd Brigade, 1st Armored Division to the Brigade Modernization Command, assigning it the evaluation mission previously held by the 5th Brigade, 1st Armored Division, AETF. In 2016, 2nd Brigade moved to the Ready pool for deployment.
- 3rd Brigade: On 28 March 2008, the 3rd Brigade, 1st Armored Division (HBCT) deactivated at Fort Riley and reflagged as 2d (Dagger) Brigade, 1st Infantry Division (HBCT). The 3rd Brigade was reactivated as an infantry brigade combat team on 2 July 2009 at Fort Bliss.
- 4th Brigade: On 4 March 2008, 4th Brigade, 1st Armored Division activated at Fort Bliss as a HBCT and reflagged from the 4th Brigade, 1st Cavalry Division.
- 5th Brigade: In 2007, a new unit, 5th Brigade, 1st Armored Division, activated at Fort Bliss as an Army evaluation task force. 5th BCT tested the Future Force Warrior system. It evaluated multiple types of spin out equipment and prepared them for fielding to the rest of the Army. 5th Brigade was deactivated in 2010.
- Aviation Brigade: The Aviation Brigade, 1st Armored Division deactivated on 7 June 2006 at Fliegerhorst Kaserne, Hanau, Germany and moved to Fort Riley, Kansas to reflag as the modular Combat Aviation Brigade, 1st Infantry Division. The Combat Aviation Brigade, 4th ID was reflagged to CAB, 1st Armored Division. 4–501st Aviation (4th Battalion "Pistoleros", 501st Regiment, Combat Aviation Brigade, 1st Armored Division) deployed to Kuwait in November 2012.
- Engineer Brigade: The Engineer Brigade, 1st Armored Division, the last of its kind in the Army, cased its colors and inactivated at Giessen, Germany on 26 April 2007.
- Division Artillery: Division Artillery, 1st Armored Division cased its colors and was deactivated at Baumholder, Germany on 1 May 2007. The 1st AD DIVARTY was the last standing division artillery unit in the Army. The DIVARTY reactivated in 2014 at Fort Bliss.

The division's colors were officially moved from Germany to Fort Bliss on 13 May 2011. On 25 June 2013, Army force restructuring plans were announced. As part of the plan, the division deactivated its 3rd Brigade Combat Team following its 2014 deployment to Afghanistan. The 4th BCT was reflagged as the 3rd Brigade Combat team in April 2015.

The 1st Armored Division's Sustainment Brigade deployed 200 of its soldiers to Afghanistan on 11 May 2015.

==== Operation Freedom's Sentinel ====
In late December 2016, about 1,500 soldiers from the 1st Stryker Brigade Combat Team deployed to Afghanistan as part of Operation Freedom's Sentinel. In March 2017, 200 soldiers from the 1st Sustainment Brigade deployed throughout Afghanistan to lead logistical operations in support of the US counter-terrorism mission and Afghan-led operations against the Taliban.

==== Operation Inherent Resolve ====
400 soldiers from the division's headquarters element deployed to Iraq in summer 2017, where it led the coalition's ground efforts as part of Operation Inherent Resolve. This event was commemorated with a Combined Joint Forces OIR challenge coin which has the Old Ironsides logo, the CSM rank, 7 seals, 23 world flags, the US and the Iraq flags.

== Division organization ==
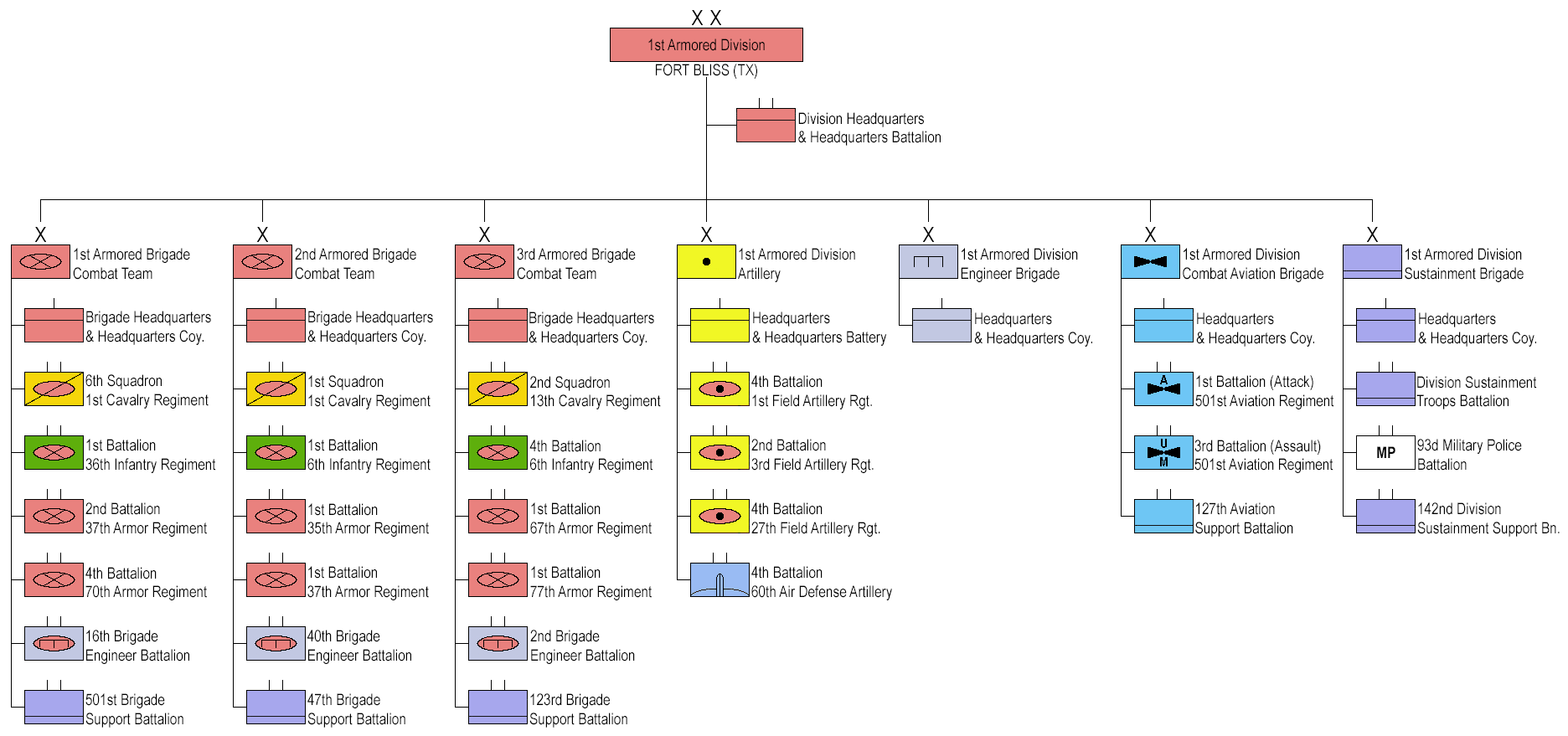
1st Armored Division organization as of June 2026

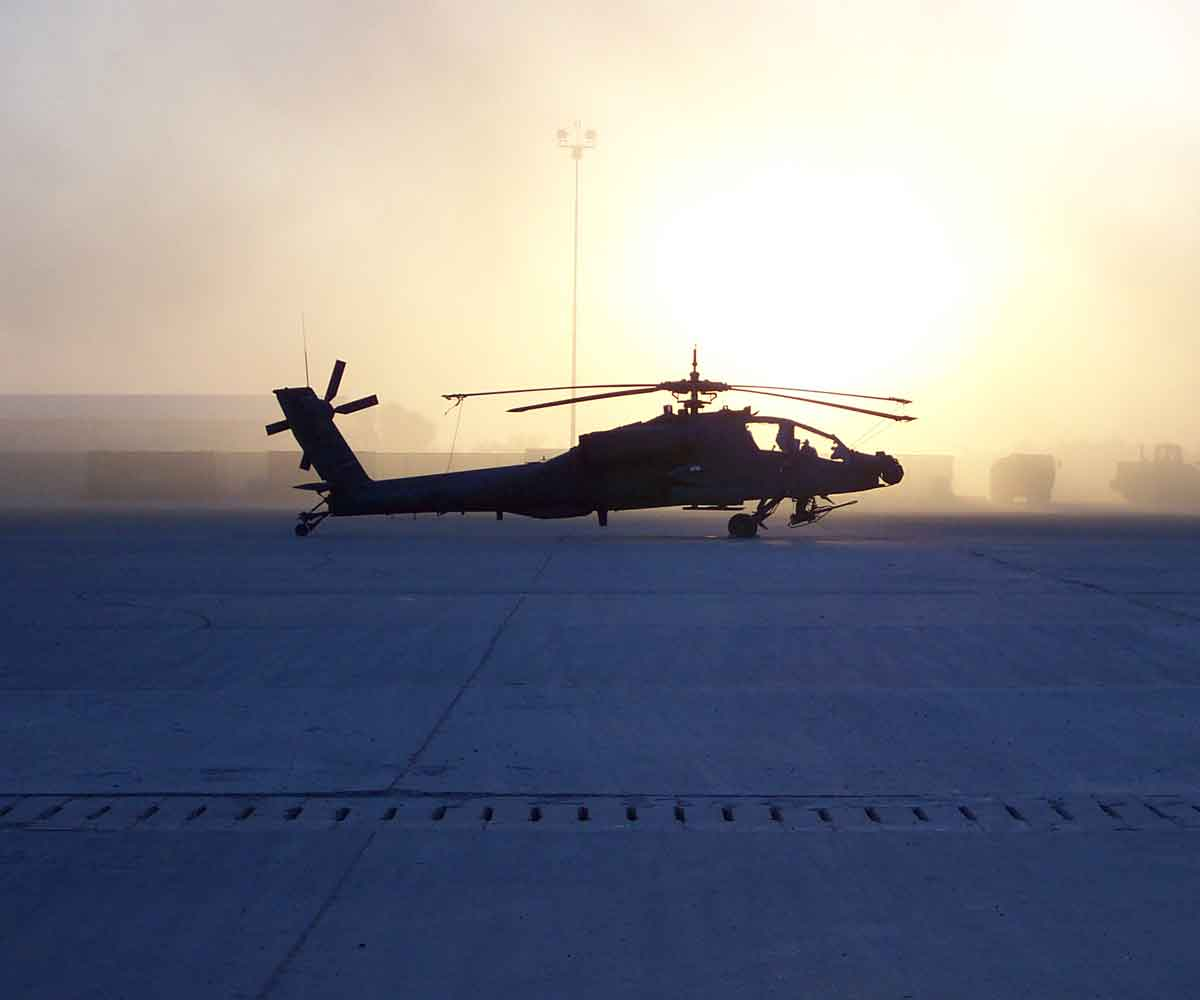
An AH-64A Apache from 1st Battalion, 501st Aviation Regiment, 1st Armored Division at the Baghdad International Airport, c. 2004

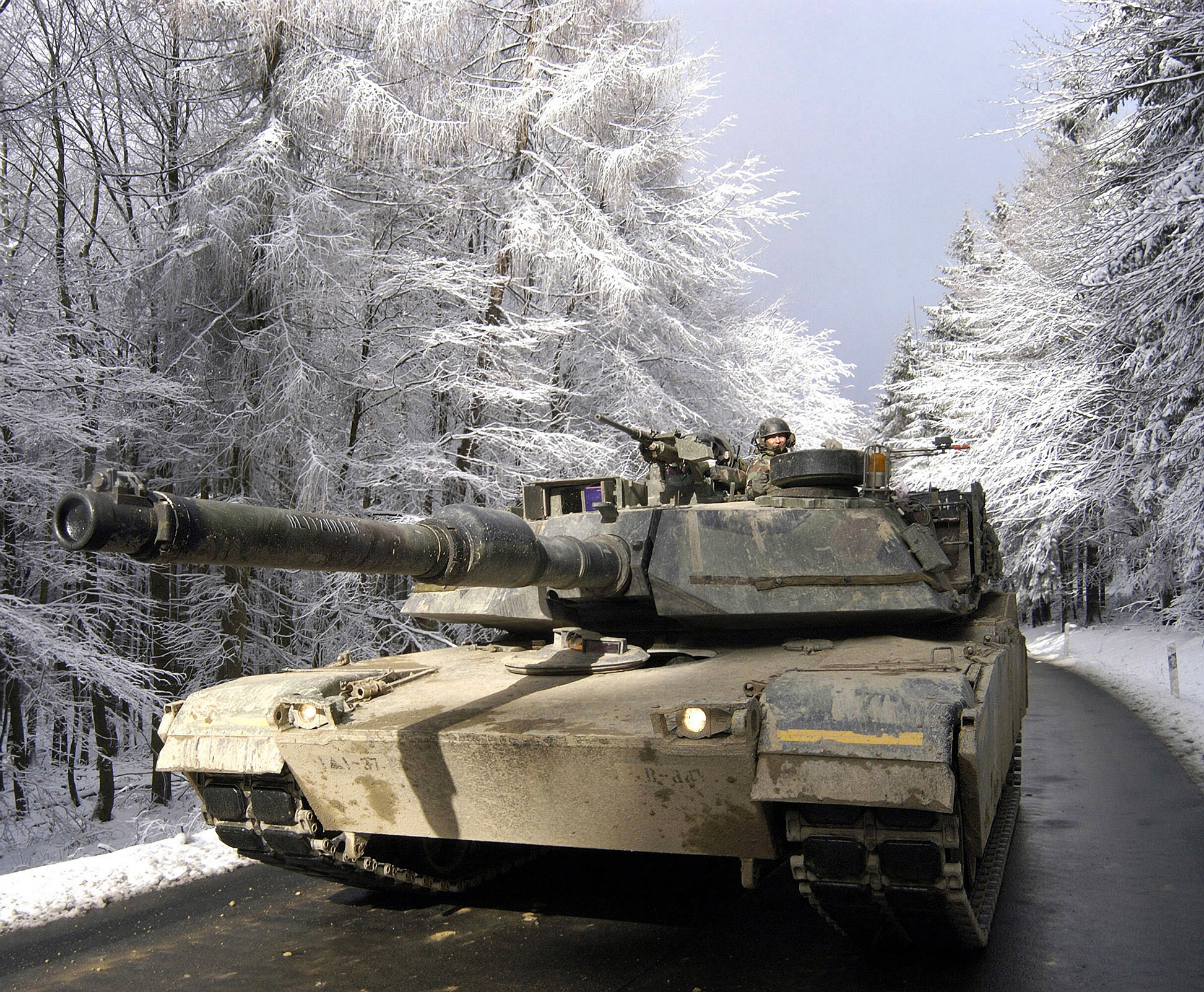
An M1 Abrams Tank driving through the Taunus Mountains North of Frankfurt, Germany during Exercise Ready Crucible, c. 2005

The division's 3rd Infantry Brigade Combat Team was inactivated after leaving Afghanistan in spring 2015, and its maneuver battalions were reassigned to the remaining three brigade combat teams; subsequently the division's 4th Armored Brigade Combat Team was re-flagged as 3rd Armored Brigade Combat Team. The 1st Stryker "Ready First" Brigade converted to an armored BCT in summer of 2019, exchanging its 300+ Strykers for Abrams tanks and Bradley fighting vehicles.

The 1st Armored Division remains configured as a full armored division, in line with its designation. The division consists of a division headquarters battalion, three armored brigade combat teams, a division artillery, a combat aviation brigade, and a sustainment brigade.

- 1st Armored Division, Fort Bliss, Texas
  - Division Headquarters and Headquarters Battalion "Gladiator"
    - Headquarters and Headquarters Company
    - Operations Company
    - Intelligence and Sustainment Company
    - Division Signal Company
    - 1st Armored Division Band
  - 1st Armored Brigade Combat Team "Ready First"
    - Headquarters and Headquarters Company
    - 6th Squadron, 1st Cavalry Regiment
    - 2nd Battalion, 37th Armor Regiment
    - 4th Battalion, 70th Armor Regiment
    - 1st Battalion, 36th Infantry Regiment
    - 16th Brigade Engineer Battalion
    - 501st Brigade Support Battalion
  - 2nd Armored Brigade Combat Team "Iron Brigade"
    - Headquarters and Headquarters Company
    - 1st Squadron, 1st Cavalry Regiment
    - 1st Battalion, 35th Armor Regiment
    - 1st Battalion, 37th Armor Regiment
    - 1st Battalion, 6th Infantry Regiment
    - 40th Brigade Engineer Battalion
    - 47th Brigade Support Battalion
  - 3rd Armored Brigade Combat Team "Bulldog Brigade"
    - Headquarters and Headquarters Company
    - 2nd Squadron, 13th Cavalry Regiment
    - 1st Battalion, 67th Armor Regiment
    - 1st Battalion, 77th Armor Regiment
    - 4th Battalion, 6th Infantry Regiment
    - 2nd Brigade Engineer Battalion
    - 123rd Brigade Support Battalion
  - 1st Armored Division Artillery "Iron Steel"
    - Headquarters and Headquarters Battery
    - 4th Battalion, 1st Field Artillery Regiment
    - 2nd Battalion, 3rd Field Artillery Regiment
    - 4th Battalion, 27th Field Artillery Regiment
    - 4th Battalion, 60th Air Defense Artillery Regiment
    - F Battery, 60th Air Defense Artillery Regiment - Counter UAS Battery
    - 24th Theater Public Affairs Support Element
  - 1st Armored Division Engineer Brigade
    - Headquarters and Headquarters Company
  - Combat Aviation Brigade, 1st Armored Division "Iron Eagle"
    - Headquarters and Headquarters Company
    - 1st Battalion (Attack), 501st Aviation Regiment "Iron Dragons" (AH-64D Apache)
    - 3rd Battalion (Assault), 501st Aviation Regiment "Apocalypse" (UH-60M Black Hawk)
    - 127th Aviation Support Battalion "Work Horse"
  - 1st Armored Division Sustainment Brigade "Muleskinner"
    - Headquarters and Headquarters Company
    - Division Sustainment Troops Battalion "Iron Legion"
    - 142nd Division Sustainment Support Battalion "Atlas"
    - 93d Military Police Battalion "War Eagle"

== Commanders ==
MG Bruce Magruder (July 1940 – March 1942)
MG Orlando Ward (March 1942 – April 1943)
MG Ernest N. Harmon (April 1943 – July 1944)
MG Vernon Prichard (July 1944 – September 1945)
MG Roderick R. Allen (September 1945 – January 1946)
MG Hobart R. Gay (February to April 1946)
Division inactivated 1946-1951
MG Bruce C. Clarke (March 1951 – April 1953)
MG Leander L. Doan (April to July 1953)
BG Edward G. Farrand (acting) (July to October 1953)
MG William S. Biddle (October 1953 – July 1955)
MG Robert L. Howze Jr. (July 1955 – February 1957)
MG Edward G. Farrand (March to December 1957)
BG Delk M. Oden (December 1957 – May 1959) (Note: From 1957 to 1962, the division headquarters was inactive and Combat Command A was the organization's main command and control unit.)
BG Franklin F. Wing Jr. (May 1959 – August 1960)
BG Roland H. Del Mar (August 1960 – May 1961)
BG Roy Lassetter Jr. (May 1961 – February 1962)
MG Ralph E. Haines Jr. (February 1962 – May 1963)
MG Harvey J. Jablonsky (May 1963 – May 1965)
MG George Ruhlen (June 1965 – July 1967)
MG Richard G. Stilwell (August 1967 – April 1968)
MG John K. Boles Jr. (April 1968 – February 1970)
MG William R. Desobry (February 1970 – March 1971)
MG James C. Smith (March to May 1971)
MG James V. Galloway (May 1971 – August 1972)
MG Adrian St. John II (August 1972 – March 1974)
MG Rolland V. Heiser (March 1974 – August 1975)
MG William L. Webb Jr. (August 1975 – January 1978)
MG Glenn K. Otis (January 1978 – August 1979)
MG John C. Faith (September 1979 – November 1981)
MG Thomas F. Healy (November 1981 – October 1983)
MG Crosbie E. Saint (October 1983 – June 1985)
MG Dave R. Palmer (June 1985 – July 1986)
MG Edwin S. Leland Jr. (July 1986 – July 1988)
MG Frederick M. Franks Jr. (July 1988 – August 1989)
MG Ronald H. Griffith (August 1989 – May 1991)
MG William M. Boice (May 1991 – July 1993)
MG William G. Carter II (July 1993 – January 1995)
MG William L. Nash (January 1995 – May 1997)
MG Larry R. Ellis (May 1997 – July 1999)
MG George W. Casey Jr. (July 1999 – July 2001)
MG Ricardo S. Sánchez (July 2001 – July 2003)
MG Martin E. Dempsey (July 2003 – July 2005)
MG Fred D. Robinson Jr. (July 2005 – May 2007)
MG Mark Hertling (May 2007 – May 2009)
MG Terry A. Wolff (May 2009 – May 2011)
MG Dana J.H. Pittard (May 2011 – May 2013)
MG Sean MacFarland (May 2013 – August 2014)
MG Stephen Twitty (August 2014 – June 2016)
MG Robert P. White (June 2016 – July 2018)
MG Patrick E. Matlock (July 2018 – July 2020)
BG Matthew L. Eichburg (acting) (July to September 2020)
MG Sean C. Bernabe (September 2020 – July 2022)
MG James P. Isenhower III (July 2022 – July 2024)
MG Curtis D. Taylor (July 2024 – October 2026)
BG Brandon C. Anderson (October 2026 – present)

=== Current ===
The division command group consists of:

- Commanding General: Major General Curtis D. Taylor
- Deputy Commanding Officer (Operations): Brigadier General Alric L. Francis
- Deputy Commanding General (Maneuver): Brigadier Andrew Ridland (United Kingdom)
- Deputy Commanding Officer (Support): Colonel Paul Krattinger
- Chief of Staff: Colonel David A. Norris
- Command Sergeant Major: Command Sergeant Major James L. Light

== Insignia ==
The division was nicknamed "Old Ironsides" by its first commander, Major General Bruce Magruder, after he saw a picture of the frigate USS Constitution, also nicknamed "Old Ironsides". The large "1" at the top represents the numerical designation of the division and the insignia is used as a basis for most of the other sub-unit insignias.

In January 1918, the Tank Corps of the United States Army was established under Colonel Samuel D. Rockenbach. At his direction, First Lieutenant J. P. Wharton designed the original coat of arms: a triangle on a shield surrounded by a wreath and a silver dragon. The triangle itself is an old heraldic element of armorial design known as a pile, representing the head of a spear. There was no shoulder patch in 1918.

The 7th Cavalry Brigade (mechanized) contributed the other part of the present-day Armor shoulder patch. The brigade formed out of the 1st Cavalry Regiment in Marfa Texas, on 16 January 1933 under General Daniel Van Voorhis, then Colonel of the Cavalry. The 7th Cavalry Brigade included the 13th Cavalry and had been organized specifically to develop the new armored force concept while training in the emerging modern war-fighting tactics.

Colonel George F. Linthwaite (then a newly enlisted Private) joined the 13th Cavalry regiment in 1933. Major General Robert W. Grow (then a Major and brigade adjutant) was instructed to develop a shoulder patch for the new armored force. Grow announced to the brigade that a contest would be held to design the new Armored force patch. A three-day weekend pass was awarded to the designer of the winning entry.

Linthwaite won the contest: he designed a circular patch, four inches in diameter, with a solid yellow-gold background to symbolize the Cavalry heritage. On the face of the patch, he drew a stylized black tank track with a drive and idler sprockets to symbolize mobility. In the center of the track at a slight diagonal, he placed a single cannon barrel, also in black, to symbolize firepower. Finally, to symbolize the striking power of the new armored force, he added a diagonal lightning bolt in red, extending across the total design and full diameter of the patch.

In 1940, Major General Adna R. Chaffee Jr. was promoted to lead the newly created Armor Forces which had evolved from the old 7th Cavalry Brigade and were preparing for the looming war in Europe. Chaffee wanted a patch for this new Armored Force. He chose to combine the 7th Brigade patch with the triangle from the World War I crest. The tri-colors, with blue for infantry, red for artillery, and yellow for cavalry – represented the three basic components of the mechanized armed force. In 1940 the War Department officially designated the now-familiar patch worn by soldiers of all United States Army Armored Divisions.

== Honors ==
=== HHC, 1st Armored Division ===
Campaign participation credit

- World War II
- Gulf War
- Global war on terrorism
- Iraq War

Decorations

1. Meritorious Unit Commendation (Army) for SOUTHWEST ASIA
2. Army Superior Unit Award for TF Eagle from 10 April 1994 to 7 November 1996
3. Valorous Unit Award For Operation Iraqi Freedom I
4. Presidential Unit Citation For Operation Iraqi Freedom I
5. Joint Meritorious Unit Award For Operation Iraqi Freedom I
6. Meritorious Unit Commendation (Army) for Operation IRAQI FREEDOM 07–09
7. Meritorious Unit Commendation (Army) for Operation IRAQI FREEDOM 10–11/ Operation NEW DAWN

=== HHC, 1st Brigade, 1st Armored Division ===
Campaign participation credit

- World War II:
- Algeria-French Morocco (with arrowhead)
- Tunisia
- Naples-Foggia
- Anzio
- Rome-Arno
- North Apennines
- Po Valley

Decorations

1. Army Superior Unit Award for TF Eagle from 10 April 1994 to 7 November 1996
2. Presidential Unit Citation for Operation Iraqi Freedom
3. Joint Meritorious Unit Award for Operation Iraqi Freedom
4. Valorous Unit Citation for Operation Iraqi Freedom
5. Navy Unit Commendation for Operation Iraqi Freedom

=== HHC, 2nd Brigade, 1st Armored Division ===
Campaign participation credit

- World War II:
1. Algeria-French Morocco (with arrowhead);
2. Tunisia;
3. Naples-Foggia;
4. Anzio;
5. Rome-Arno;
6. North Apennines;
7. Po Valley
- Southwest Asia:
1. Defense of Saudi Arabia;
2. Liberation and Defense of Kuwait;
3. Cease-Fire

Decorations

1. Presidential Unit Citation for OIF 1 (2003–2004)
2. Valorous Unit Award, IRAQ 1991
3. Meritorious Unit Commendation, SOUTHWEST ASIA 2005–2006
4. Meritorious Unit Commendation, IRAQ 2008–2009
5. Army Superior Unit Award for 1995–1996

=== HHC, 3rd Brigade, 1st Armored Division ===
Campaign participation credit

- World War II:
1. Rome-Arno;
2. North Apennines;
3. Po Valley
- Southwest Asia:
1. Defense of Saudi Arabia;
2. Liberation and Defense of Kuwait;
3. Cease-Fire

Decorations

1. Valorous Unit Award for IRAQ-KUWAIT
2. Valorous Unit Award for Operation Iraqi Freedom (OIF 1)

=== HHB, 1st Armored Division Artillery ===
Campaign participation credit

- World War II:
1. Tunisia;
2. Naples-Foggia;
3. Rome-Arno;
4. Anzio;
5. North Apennines;
6. Po Valley
- Southwest Asia:
1. Defense of Saudi Arabia;
2. Liberation and Defense of Kuwait

Decorations

1. Meritorious Unit Commendation (Army) for SOUTHWEST ASIA

=== HHC, 1st Armored Division Support Command ===
Campaign participation credit

- World War II:
1. Tunisia;
2. Naples-Foggia;
3. Rome-Arno;
4. North Apennines;
5. Po Valley
- Southwest Asia:
1. Defense of Saudi Arabia;
2. Liberation and Defense of Kuwait;
3. Cease-Fire

Decorations

1. Meritorious Unit Commendation (Army) for SOUTHWEST ASIA

=== HHC, Aviation Brigade, 1st Armored Division ===
Campaign participation credit;

- Southwest Asia:
1. Defense of Saudi Arabia;
2. Liberation and Defense of Kuwait;
3. Cease-Fire

Decorations;

1. Valorous Unit Award for IRAQ-KUWAIT
2. Army Superior Unit Award for 1995–1996

== Additional reading ==
- George F. Howe (1979). The Battle History of the 1st Armored Division. The Battery Press, Inc. ISBN 0-89839-025-7. Covers its first (World War II era) incarnation.
