= Thomas F. Healy =

United States Army general (1931–2004)

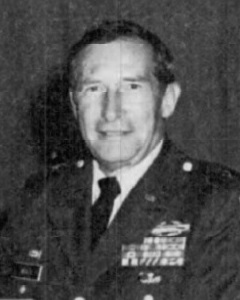
Thomas F. Healy as a major general in late 1984

Shoulder Sleeve Insignia of the 1st Armored Division, to which General Healy was once attached.

Thomas Francis Healy Jr. (September 18, 1931 – December 9, 2004) was a U.S. Army general and former commandant of the Army War College.

== Early life and education ==
Healy was born in Cambridge, Massachusetts on September 18, 1931. He graduated from Holyoke High School in Massachusetts in 1949 and then attended the University of Massachusetts Amherst for a year before being appointed to the United States Military Academy at West Point. He graduated with a B.S. degree and his officers commission in 1954. He also received a Diplom from the University of Heidelberg in Germany and an M.A. degree from Columbia University (1964). He also attended the Command and General Staff College, the Armed Forces Staff College and the Army War College.

== Military career ==
His duties of assignment within the Army included overseeing the Advanced Armor School, tours at West Point as professor of German and later as Executive Tactical Officer of the 3rd Cadet Regiment. Also, he accumulated two Vietnam tours, including one as an operations officer for the Army of the Republic of Vietnam's High Command. In this assignment, he worked with translators and executive officers of the 3rd Battalion, 4th Regiment of the 1st Air Cavalry Division. During his second tour, he commanded the 5th Battalion of the 7th Regiment of the 1st Air Cavalry Division. While in Vietnam, Healy served with the now-famous Norman Schwarzkopf. Healy also served as a superior officer to then-subordinate Tommy Franks as well.

Later, he became a member of the Military Assistance Command, Vietnam staff. He served on the Department of the Army staff in Washington, in the department of Personnel and Operations. He also served in staff positions with Allied Forces Central Europe and at the international NATO Headquarters in Belgium.

His other command assignments included Commander, 3rd “Bull Dog” Brigade of the 1st Armored Division in Bamberg, Germany, serving as the Assistant Division Commander for Support (ADC-A), 1st Armored Division and Commander, Nürnberg Military Community, Germany. His next assignment was Deputy Chief of Staff for Personnel, United States Army, Europe (USAREUR) in Heidelberg, Germany. He was then assigned as the Commanding General and Commandant of the US Army War College in Carlisle Barracks, Pennsylvania. Following this he became Commanding General of the 1st Armored Division, Ansbach, Germany. His distinguished career's final assignment was as the Chief of Staff of the Allied Forces: Southern Europe in Naples, Italy. Thomas F. Healy retired at the rank of Lieutenant General.

== Awards and decorations ==
Combat Infantryman Badge.

Graphic representation of the Silver Star ribbon, as worn by Lt. Gen. Healy.

Awards and decorations awarded to General Healy included the Defense Distinguished Service Medal, Distinguished Service Medal, Silver Star, the Legion of Merit (awarded to him three times), the Bronze Star (awarded twice) and the Air Medal, awarded nineteen times overall, the Army Commendation Medal, the Vietnam Honor Medal, and other various service medals. Other awards presented to him include the Parachutist Badge, and the Combat Infantryman Badge.

== Death ==
On December 9, 2004, Healy died after complications from cancer in Fredericksburg, Virginia. He is buried at Arlington National Cemetery.
