= 141st Signal Battalion (United States) =

- 141st Signal Battalion Coat Of Arms
- Active: 1 June 1940 – 26 April 1946; 7 March 1951 – 27 December 1957; 24 September 1960 – 1 May 2007
- Country: United States
- Branch: Regular Army
- Type: Separate Battalion
- Role: Armor
- Garrison/HQ: Wiesbaden, Germany
- Nickname(s): "The Communicators" (Special Designation)
- Motto(s): "ENSE ET VOCE" (With Sword and Voice)
- Colors: Orange and White
- Engagements: Algeria-French Morocco; Tunisia; Naples-Foggia; Anzio; Rome-Arno; North Apennines; Po Valley; Defense of Saudi Arabia; Liberation and Defense of Kuwait; Cease-Fire.

Insignia
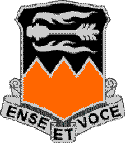
- Distinctive Unit Insignia

141st Signal Battalion ("The Communicators") was a United States battalion which deployed to install, operate and maintain C4I systems in support of 1st Armored Division operations, major subordinate commands and attached units as required.

== History ==
The 141st Signal Battalion dates back to 1 June 1940, when it was activated at Fort Knox, Kentucky, as the 7th Signal Troop (Mechanized). It was later redesignated the 47th Signal Company (Armored), and assigned to the 1st Armored Division.

On 12 August 1941, the organization's designation was changed to the 141st Armored Signal Company. Detachments of the 141st were in the initial assault waves on the beaches of North Africa as part of Operation Torch in 1942. The 141st supported the 1st Armored Division as it fought its way across the African coast, capturing Oran and cleaning out Tunisia. It was part of the division's spearhead in the Battle of the Kasserine Pass.

The official history of the United States Army in World War II says of the unit during this period, "This unit was undoubtedly one of the best signal outfits in the Army.... The service provided by this crack unit suggested how effective communications could be in the hands of experienced troops."

After the Africa Campaign, the 141st moved to Italy, landing at Salerno. It fought as part of the 1st Armored Division at Anzio, Rome and Naples; participated in the campaign of the Italian Mountains, and was with the division when it captured Milan.

The battalion colors carry campaign streamers from World War II for Tunisia, Anzio, Naples-Foggia, Rome-Arno, Po Valley and North Apennines. After World War II, in February 1946, the 1st Armored Division and the 141st redeployed to Camp Kilmer, New Jersey, where it was inactivated on 26 April 1946.

During the Korean War, the unit was reactivated in March 1951 at Fort Hood, Texas, but did not deploy. In February 1957, the 141st Signal Company was reorganized as a battalion but was shortly deactivated again in December 1957.

Its current active status dates from February 1960. In August 1971, the 141st Signal Battalion began deployment to Ansbach, Germany, where it began its current history as a forward-deployed European-based Battalion.

On 20 December 1990, the 141st Signal Battalion was deployed to Southwest Asia in support of Operation Desert Shield. The battalion provided front line communications to the 1st Armored Division in the fast-moving VII Corps campaign to destroy Iraqi forces during Operation Desert Storm and the liberation of Kuwait. B Company was awarded the Valorous Unit Award.

Upon redeployment from Southwest Asia, the colors of the 141st Signal Battalion relocated to Bad Kreuznach, Germany, where, on 26 November 1991, they replaced those of the 8th Signal Battalion.

In December 1995, advance elements of the battalion deployed with the 1st Armored Division to Bosnia and Herzegovina in support of Operation Joint Endeavor.

In September 1997, the battalion again deployed to Bosnia and Herzegovina as part of the Stabilization Force (SFOR) deployed in support of Operation Joint Guard. The battalion returned to Bad Kreuznach in June 1998.

In June 2000, elements of the battalion deployed to Kosovo to support the 1st Armored Division's peace-keeping mission.

In May 2001, the battalion relocated its headquarters from Bad Kreuznach to Wiesbaden Army Airfield, now Lucius D. Clay Kaserne.

In May 2003, the battalion was deployed as part of 1st AD to OIF 1.

On 1 May 2007 141 Signal Battalion was inactivated. Remnants of the 141st Signal Battalion became the 146th Signal Company under the Special Troops Battalion (STB) of the 1st Armored Division.

== Lineage and honors ==
- Constituted 1 June 1940 in the Regular Army as the 7th Signal Troop and activated at Fort Knox, Kentucky
- Reorganized and redesignated 15 July 1940 as the 47th Signal Company and assigned to the U.S. 1st Armored Division
- Redesignated 7 August 1941 as the 141st Signal Armored Company
- Redesignated 1 January 1942 as the 141st Armored Signal Company
- Inactivated 26 April 1946 at Camp Kilmer, New Jersey
- Activated 7 March 1951 at Fort Hood, Texas
- Reorganized and redesigned 15 February 1957 as Headquarters and Headquarter Company, 141 Signal Battalion (organic elements constituted 11 February 1957 and activated 15 February 1957 at Fort Polk, Louisiana)
- Inactivated 23 December 1957 at Fort Polk, Louisiana
- (Company A activated 24 September 1960 at Fort Hood, Texas)
- Activated (less Company A) 3 February 1962 at Fort Hood, Texas

== Campaign participation credit ==
=== World War II ===
1. Algeria-French Morocco (with arrowhead)
2. Tunisia
3. Naples-Foggia
4. Anzio
5. Rome-Arno
6. North Apennines
7. Po Valley

=== Southwest Asia ===
1. Defense of Saudi Arabia
2. Liberation and Defense of Kuwait
3. Cease-Fire
4. Operation Iraqi Freedom

== Decorations ==
- Company A, Company B Presidential Unit Citation (Army), SOUTHWEST ASIA
- Company A Navy Unit Commendation (I MEF), SOUTHWEST ASIA
- Meritorious Unit Commendation (Army), Streamer embroidered SOUTHWEST ASIA
- Army Superior Unit Award
- Company B additionally entitled to:
  - Valorous Unit Award, Streamer embroidered IRAQ-KUWAIT
