= 501st Aviation Regiment =

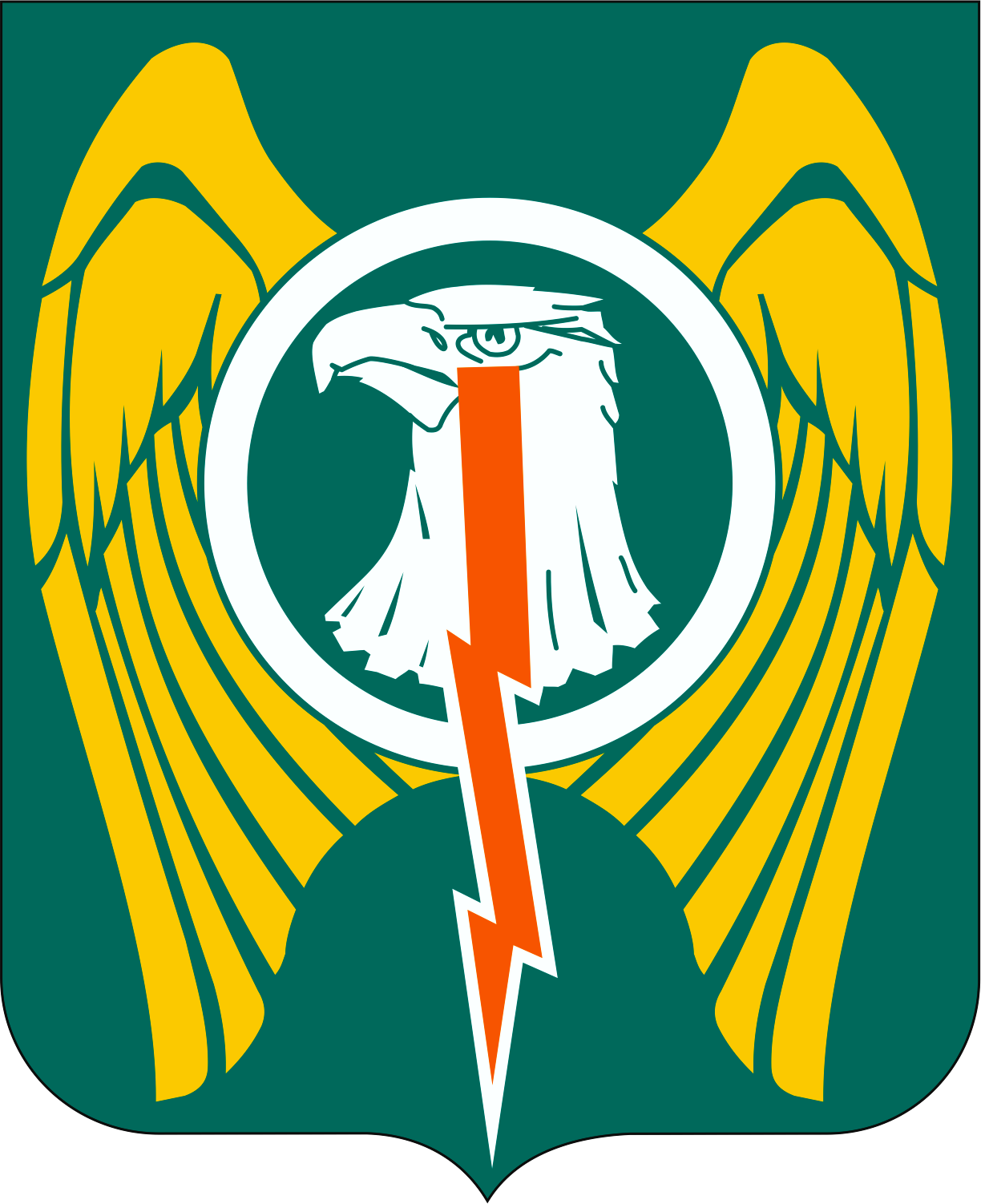
- coat of arms
- Active: 1986-2006 2011-present
- Country: United States
- Branch: United States Army Aviation Branch
- Type: Aviation
- Role: Attack, Lift, Cargo, Reconnaissance
- Size: Battalion
- Garrison/HQ: Biggs Army Airfield, Ft. Bliss Texas
- Motto: "The Warding Eye"
- Decorations: Presidential Unit Citation (1st), Valorous Unit Citation (1st, 2nd),
- Battle honours: Vietnam, Desert Storm, war on terrorism

Insignia
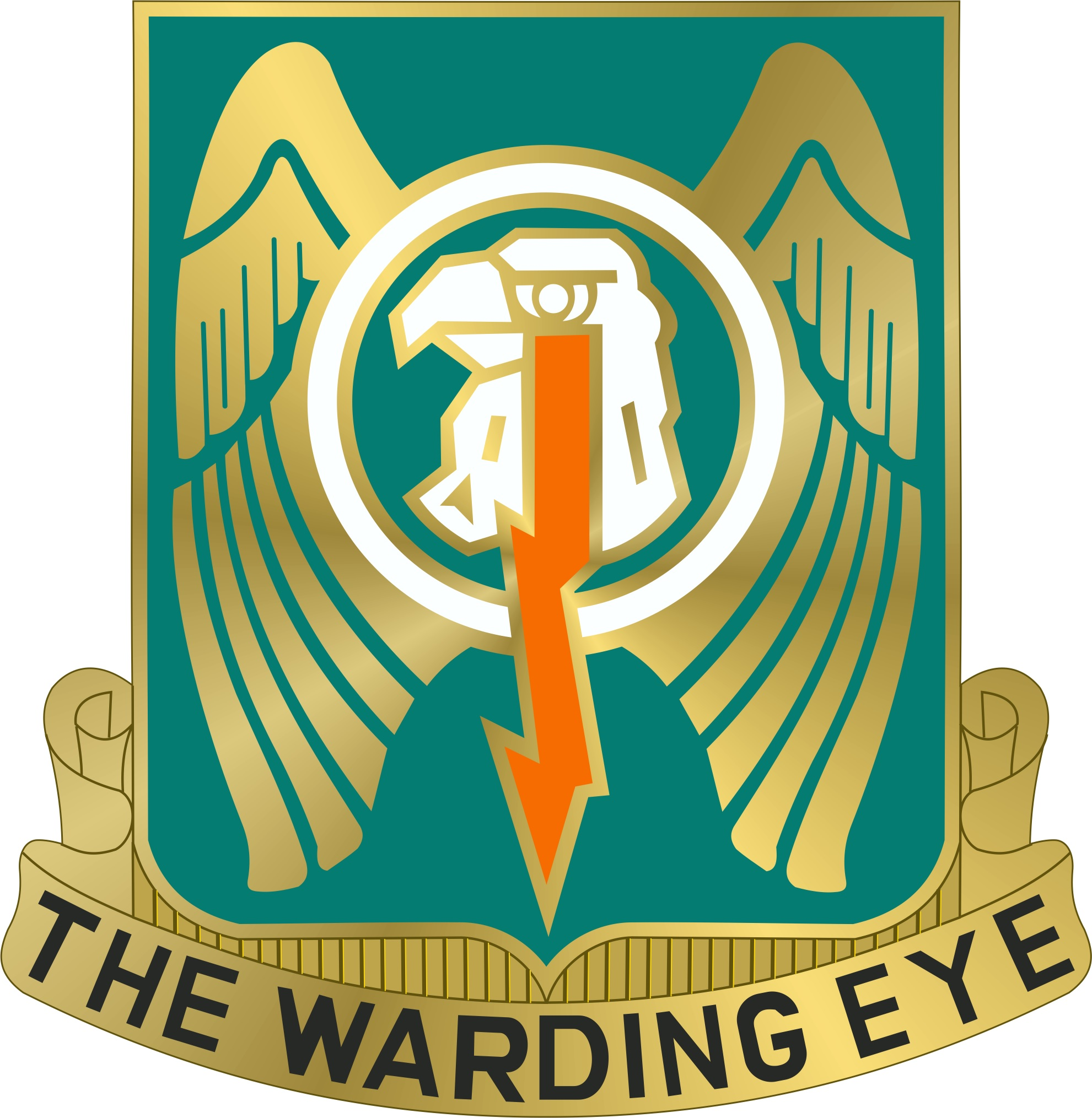
- Distinctive Unit Insignia

Aircraft flown
- Attack helicopter: AH-64D Apache
- Cargo helicopter: CH-47F Chinook
- Utility helicopter: UH-60L Black Hawk
- Reconnaissance: MQ-1C Gray Eagle

The 501st Aviation Regiment is an aviation regiment of the US Army. It draws its history from the original aviation battalion of the 1st Armored Division, the 501st Aviation Battalion. The 501st Aviation Battalion was active with the division in the mid-1980s. It has always been associated with the 1st Armored Division.

The 501st Combat Aviation Battalion was activated 21 August 1978 in Germany; inactivated 16 November 1987 in Germany. Relieved from the 1st Armored Division, reorganized and re-designated 16 October 1988 as the 501st Aviation, a parent regiment under the United States Army Regimental System with headquarters in Korea. The regiment has undergone numerous changes and has served in numerous conflicts including Joint Endeavor (Bosnia/Herzegovina), Operation Iraqi Freedom (OIF III), Operation Spartan Shield (Kuwait), Operation Inherent Resolve (Iraq) and Operations Enduring Freedom and Freedoms Sentinel (2013 and 2019 respectively) in Afghanistan. In addition to combat actions, the regiment has taken part in relief efforts in several operations including Liberia (Ebola), San Antonio (Hurricane Harvey), and Puerto Rico (Hurricane Maria)

The regiment remains currently assigned to the 1st Armored Division Combat Aviation Brigade, located at Fort Bliss (Texas), where it moved to when the brigade was inactivated in Germany in 2006 and reactivated in 2011.

== Structure ==
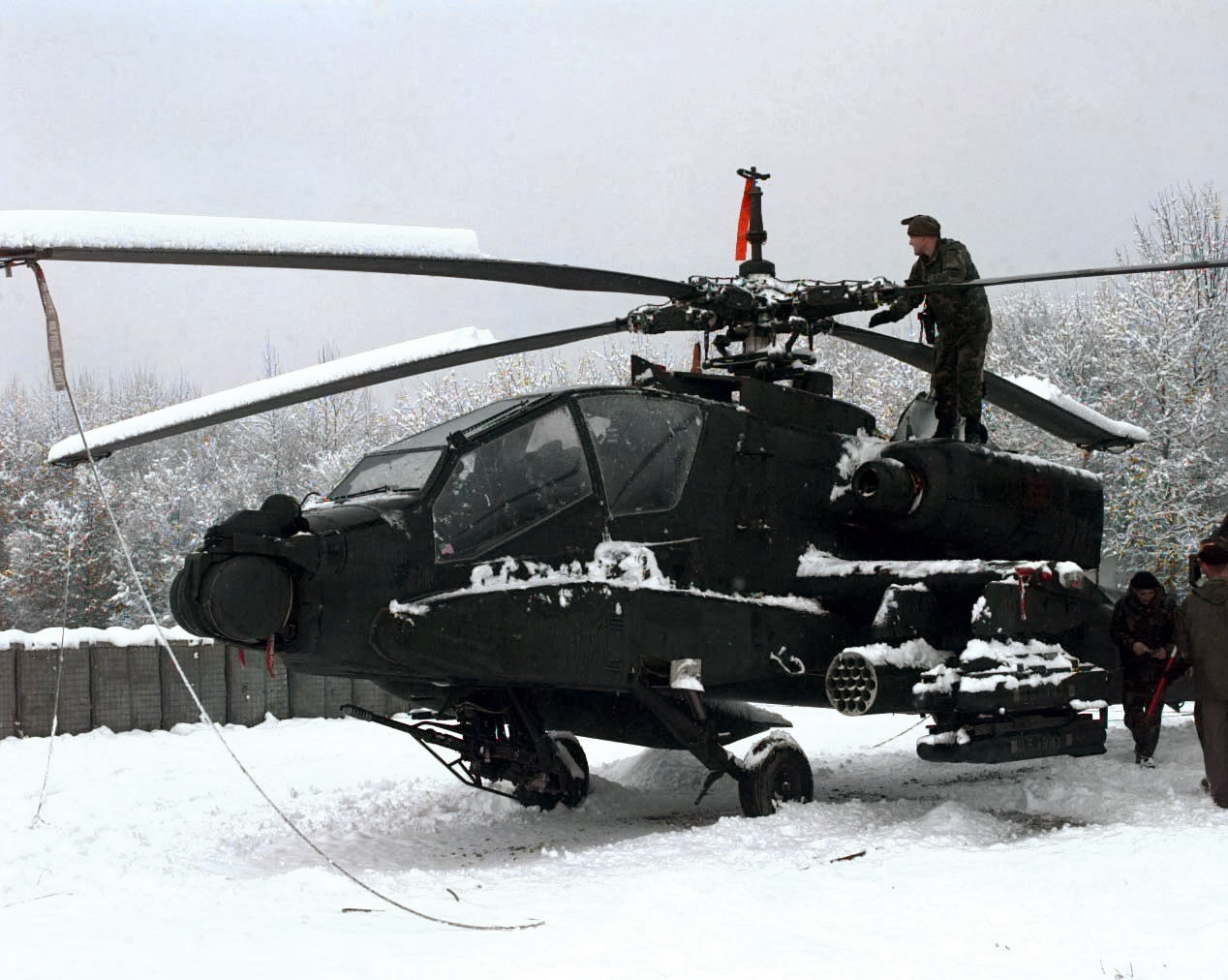
A U.S. Army soldier of the 1st Battalion 501st Aviation Brigade removes snow from the top of an AH-64A Apache attack helicopter at the Eagle Base Air Field Tuzla, Bosnia and Herzegovina, on 16 Dec. 1997. The 501st Aviation Brigade is deployed from Hanau, Germany, to Bosnia and Herzegovina to support the Stabilization Force in Operation Joint Guard..

The current battalions of the 501st Aviation regiment are as follows:

- 1st Battalion (Attack Reconnaissance) "Iron Dragons"
  - Afghanistan (February 2019 - October 2019)
  - Headquarters and Headquarters Company
  - Company A "Assassins" (AH-64D)
  - Company B "Death Dealers" (AH-64D)
  - Company C "Steel Hunters" (AH-64D)
    - Iraq 2003 - 2004
  - Company D "Dark Knights" (Maintenance)
  - Company E "Punishers" (Forward Support Company)
- 2nd Battalion (General Support) "Desert Knights"
  - Afghanistan (February 2019 - October 2019)
  - Headquarters and Headquarters Company "Crusaders"
  - Company A "Black Cats" (UH-60M)
  - Company B "Black Knights" (CH-47F)
  - Company C "Lonestar Dustoff" (HH-60 MEDEVAC)
  - Company D "Dragonslayers" (Maintenance)
  - Company E "Templars" (Forward Support Company)
  - Company F "Knight Watchers" (Air Traffic Control)
- 3rd Battalion (Assault) "Apocalypse" (Previously 6-6th Cavalry)
  - Afghanistan (February 2019 - October 2019)
  - Headquarters and Headquarters Company "Hellhounds"
  - Company A "Archangels" (UH-60M)
  - Company B "Beast Assault" (UH-60M)
  - Company C "Chaos" (UH-60M)
  - Company D "Demons" (Maintenance)
  - Company E "Enforcers" (Forward Support Company)
- Company E, 501 Aviation Regiment "Executioners" (MQ-1C) Gray Eagle UAS Company
- 4th Battalion Reflagged as 1st battalion after 1st Bn reflagged as 3/6 Cav "Heavy Cav" in 2015.
