= Charles S. Kilburn =

U.S. Army brigadier general

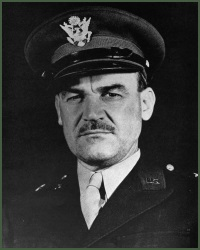
- Born: January 2, 1895; Silver City, New Mexico, United States
- Died: December 28, 1978 (aged 83); Carmel-by-the-Sea, California, United States
- Burial place: Arlington National Cemetery, Virginia, United States
- Spouse: Edith Chabot (m. 1919-1978, his death)
- Children: 4
- Military career
- Allegiance: United States
- Branch: United States Army
- Service years: 1917−1946
- Rank: Brigadier General
- Unit: Cavalry Branch
- Commands: 7th Field Signal Battalion; 8th Cavalry Regiment; 3rd Cavalry Brigade; Combat Command A, 11th Armored Division; 11th Armored Division; Florida Military District; Camp Blanding, Florida
- Conflicts: Mexican Border War; World War I World War II
- Awards: Legion of Merit

Charles S. Kilburn (January 2, 1895 – December 28, 1978) was a career officer in the United States Army who attained the rank of brigadier general and was most notable for his World War II command of the 11th Armored Division from 1944 to 1945.

== Early life ==
Charles Solomon Kilburn was born in Silver City, New Mexico on January 2, 1895, the son of John Franklin Kilburn and Harriet M. (Randall) Kilburn. He was raised and educated in El Paso, Texas, where his parents operated a ranch. He attended El Paso High School, from which he graduated in 1913, and he was president of his senior class. After graduation, Kilburn competed for an appointment from William Robert Smith to the United States Military Academy (USMA) at West Point, New York. Kilburn obtained the appointment and attended West Point from 1913 to 1917. He graduated in April 1917 ranked 92nd of 139 and received his commission as a second lieutenant of Cavalry. Because of his ranching background, during his West Point career his classmates nicknamed him "Rattlesnake Pete", the nickname of Peter Gruber, a Rochester, New York folk figure who operated a snake-themed museum and saloon in the early 1900s.

== Early military career ==
Kilburn was initially assigned to the 17th Cavalry Regiment and posted to Camp Harry J. Jones in Douglas, Arizona, where he took part in defense of the Mexico–United States border during the Mexican Border War. In May he was promoted to first lieutenant. In August, Kilburn was promoted again, thus time to temporary captain as the army underwent expansion during U.S. participation in World War I. From September to December 1917, Kilburn was assigned to Camp Sherman, Ohio as aide-de-camp to Brigadier General Willard Ames Holbrook, the commander of the 165th Infantry Brigade.

From December 1917 to February 1918, Kilburn was assigned to the 83rd Field Artillery Regiment at Fort D. A. Russell, Wyoming, and, from February to September 1918, Kilburn was assigned to the 8th Cavalry Regiment in Marfa, Texas. From September to December 1918, Kilburn was again aide-de-camp to Willard Holbrook, who was now the commander of the newly activated 9th Division at Camp Sheridan near Montgomery, Alabama. While he was in this position the war ended due to the Armistice with Germany. From January to March 1919, Kilburn was assigned to Fort Bliss, Texas as a student at the Machine Gun Officers' Course. He was then assigned as aide-de-camp to DeRosey Caroll Cabell, commander of the Army's Southern Department.

In December 1919, Kilburn married Edith Chabot of San Antonio. They were the parents of three daughters and a son.

== Continued career ==
Following the First World War, Kilburn was promoted to permanent captain. His post-war assignments included instructor at the Southern Department's Military Government School, which was located at Fort Bliss, commander of the 7th Field Signal Battalion at Fort Sam Houston, Texas, and aide-de-camp to Edward Mann Lewis, commander of the Eighth Corps Area. He graduated from the Infantry Officers' Course in 1924. From July 1924 to June 1925 he was assigned to the 4th Cavalry Regiment at Fort Meade, South Dakota.

In the mid-1920s, he served as aide-de-camp to General John L. Hines during Hine's term as Army Chief of Staff. When Hines moved on to command of the Ninth Corps Area, Kilburn continued to serve as his aide. Kilburn was a 1932 graduate of the Cavalry Officers' Advanced Course. He was promoted to major in 1932 and was assigned to command of a squadron in the 2nd Cavalry Division at Fort Riley, Kansas. In March 1933, Kilburn discovered two dead individuals in a room at his Fort Riley headquarters. They were identified as a private in the 9th Cavalry Regiment and a woman employed as a maid at Fort Riley. Police believed them to have been involved in a romantic relationship, and concluded that the soldier had killed the woman, then committed suicide.

In 1937, Kilburn graduated from the United States Army War College and was assigned to the staff of the Office of the Chief of Cavalry. He was promoted to lieutenant colonel on July 1, 1940 and from April until August 1941 he was assigned to the War Plans Section of the War Department General Staff.

== World War II ==
In August 1941, Kilburn was assigned to command of the 8th Cavalry Regiment, and he was promoted to colonel in the Army of the United States (AUS) on December 12, 1941, just after the United States entered World War II. He continued to command the 8th Cavalry until May 1942, when he assumed command of the 3rd Cavalry Brigade. On June 23, 1942, Kilburn was promoted to brigadier general (AUS). Soon after his promotion, Kilburn was assigned to command of Combat Command "A" of the 11th Armored Division during its organization and training at Camp Polk, Louisiana. In March 1944, he took command of the 11th Armored Division after its commander, Major General Edward H. Brooks, was transferred to command of the 2nd Armored Division. Kilburn then led the 11th Armored during training at Camp Cooke, California and later in England.

The division landed in Normandy in December 1944, and was assigned to mop up German forces in the Lorient pocket. During the Battle of the Bulge, the 11th Armored Division executed a forced march to the Meuse and took up the defense of a 30-mile sector from Givet to Sedan. In late December 1944 and early January 1945, the division counterattacked German units near Neufchâteau, Belgium, then defended the highway from Neufchâteau to Bastogne in order to halt the German advance.

The division made contact with units of the U.S. First Army at Houffalize, Belgium on January 16, then took part in the breaching of the Siegfried Line. The 11th Armored continued the attack into Germany throughout the spring of 1945. In late March 1945, Kilburn was relieved of command as the result of his performance in combat during the division's crossing of the River Rhine. Kilburn lost communications with his subordinate units during the attack, and his superiors, Troy H. Middleton and George S. Patton decided to replace him and he was succeeded by Brigadier General Holmes E. Dager. Kilburn was a recipient of the Legion of Merit for his wartime service.

== Post-World War II ==
In June 1945, a month after the end of World War II in Europe, Kilburn, relinquished his wartime rank of brigadier general and reverted to the permanent rank of colonel. After returning to the United States, he was assigned as Chief of Post War Plans on the Army staff. In January 1946, he assumed command of the Florida Military District and Camp Blanding, Florida. He retired as a colonel on December 1, 1946. On October 22, 1948, Kilburn was promoted to brigadier general on the retired list.

At the first reunion of the 11th Armored Division in August 1947, attendees passed a resolution expressing appreciation for Kilburn's service as their commander and regret at his removal from command. In addition, they elected him the honorary president of the 11th Division Veterans Association.

In retirement, Kilburn was a resident first of Larkspur, California, and later of Kentfield, California. In the 1950s he served as Larkspur's civil defense director. At an August 1954 meeting of the 11th Armored Division Veterans Association, Kilburn and Willard Ames Holbrook Jr., who had succeeded Kilburn as wartime commander of the 11th Armored's Combat Command A, received commissions as Kentucky Colonels from Lieutenant Governor Emerson Beauchamp.

In addition to his civil defense work, Kilburn was also involved in civic and charitable efforts, including raising funds for The Salvation Army in Marin County, California. Kilburn died in Carmel-by-the-Sea, California on December 31, 1978, at the age of 83. He was buried at Arlington National Cemetery.

Military offices
Preceded by Edward H. Brooks	Commanding General 11th Armored Division; 1944–1945	Succeeded by Holmes E. Dager
