= Holmes E. Dager =

U.S. Army major general

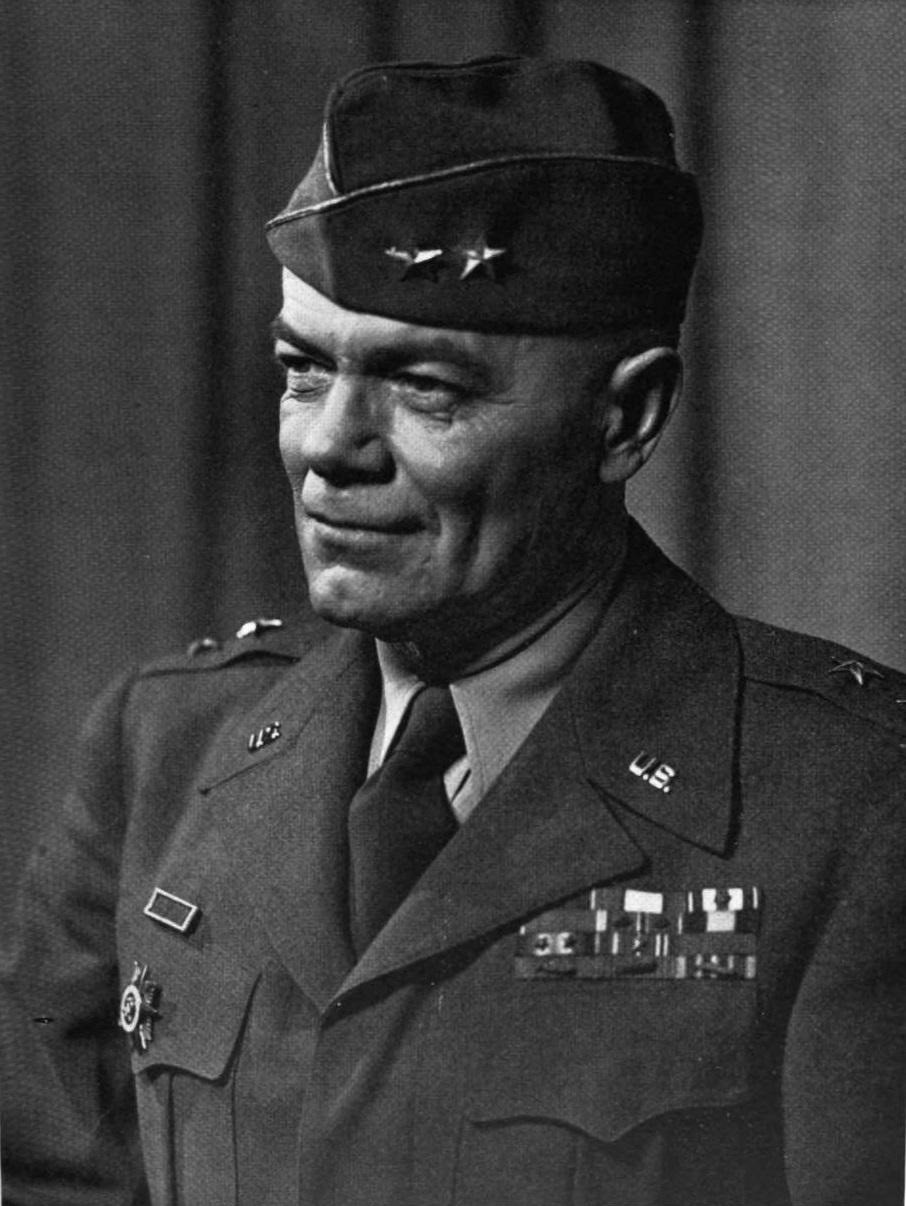
- From 1948's Thunderbolt: The History Of The 11th Armored Division
- Born: June 23, 1893; Asbury Park, New Jersey, U.S.
- Died: July 24, 1973 (aged 80); Washington, D.C., U.S.
- Burial place: Arlington National Cemetery
- Education: United States Army Command and General Staff College; United States Army War College
- Spouse(s): Marguerite Craighead (m. 1917–1947) Eleanora Benecka (m. 1948–1973)
- Military career
- Service: New Jersey National Guard; United States Army
- Service years: 1912–1914, 1916–1917 (National Guard); 1917–1947 (Army)
- Rank: Major General
- Service number: 0-5013
- Units: U.S. Army Infantry Branch; U.S. Army Armor Branch
- Commands: Company H, 51st Infantry Regiment; Company F, 51st Infantry Regiment; 3rd Battalion, 51st Infantry Regiment; Provisional Battalion, 6th Infantry Division; Company K, 29th Infantry Regiment; Special Troops Battalion, 1st Infantry Division; Fort Wadsworth; 41st Armored Infantry Regiment; Combat Command B, 8th Armored Division; Combat Command B, 4th Armored Division; 4th Armored Division; 11th Armored Division; U.S. Forces, Austria
- Conflicts: Mexican Border War; World War I Occupation of the Rhineland; World War II
- Awards: Distinguished Service Cross; Army Distinguished Service Medal; Silver Star (2); Legion of Merit; Bronze Star Medal (3); Legion of Honor (Chevalier) (France); Croix de Guerre with Palm (France); Order of the Patriotic War First Class (USSR)
- Other work: Executive, Federal Civil Defense Administration

Holmes E. Dager (June 23, 1893 – July 24, 1973) was a career officer in the United States Army. A veteran of the Mexican Border War, World War I, World War II, and the Occupation of the Rhineland, he served in the National Guard from 1912 to 1917 and the army from 1917 to 1947. Dager attained the rank of major general, and his awards included the Distinguished Service Cross, Army Distinguished Service Medal, Silver Star with oak leaf cluster, Legion of Merit, Bronze Star Medal with two oak leaf clusters, French Legion of Honor (Chevalier), and French Croix de Guerre with Palm. Originally an Infantry officer, Dager later moved to the Armor branch, and his Second World War commands included: Combat Command B, 8th Armored Division; Combat Command B, 4th Armored Division; 4th Armored Division; 11th Armored Division; and U.S. Forces, Austria.

A native of Asbury Park, New Jersey, Dager was raised and educated in Newark, New Jersey, then joined the New Jersey National Guard. Commissioned a second lieutenant, he served with his unit in Arizona during the Mexican Border War. Commissioned in the regular army as the U.S. military expanded for World War I, he served in combat in France as a member of the 51st Infantry Regiment. Dager remained in the army after the war, and served in a variety of command and staff positions as he advanced through the ranks.

During World War II, Dager led Armor units during fighting in Europe, including Combat Command B, 8th Armored Division, the 4th Armored Division's Combat Command B, the 4th Armored Division, and the 11th Armored Division. During the post-war occupation, he commanded U.S. Forces, Austria. After retiring from the army in 1947, Dager was an executive with Federal Civil Defense Administration. He retired in the mid-1960s and resided in Arlington, Virginia. Dager died at Walter Reed Army Medical Center and was buried at Arlington National Cemetery.

== Early life ==
Holmes Ely Dager was born in Asbury Park, New Jersey on June 23, 1893, a son of Martin V. Dager and Lillian S. (Ely) Dager. He was raised and educated in Newark, New Jersey, and completed his schooling at Newark's Franklin Public School in 1909. After graduating from high school, Dager worked as a salesman for Newark's Wiegand & Co. jewelry store. In 1912, he joined the New Jersey National Guard and received his commission as a second lieutenant in Company C, 1st New Jersey Infantry Regiment.

In 1916 and 1917, Dager served with his company at Camp Harry J. Jones, Arizona during the Mexican Border War. In 1917, Dager's application for a regular army commission was approved and he was assigned to the 51st Infantry Regiment as a second lieutenant. Also in 1917, he married Marguerite Craighead, a fellow resident of Newark.

== Start of career ==
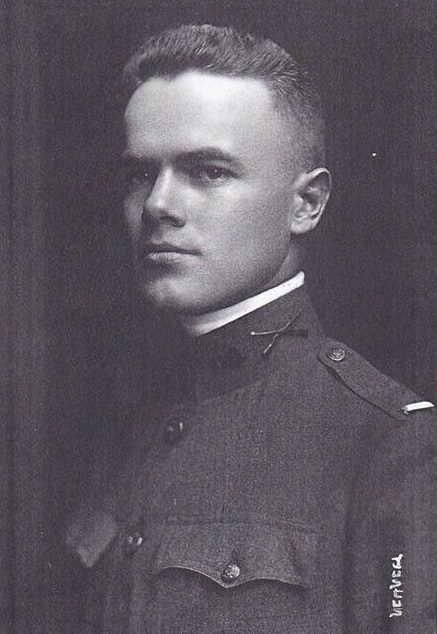
Dager as a lieutenant, circa 1918

After completing initial officer training at Fort Leavenworth, Kansas and Fort Sill, Oklahoma in the summer of 1917, Dager was promoted to first lieutenant and joined his regiment. He took part in the 51st Infantry's organization and training at Camp Forrest (Tennessee), Camp Wadsworth (South Carolina), and Camp McClellan (Alabama), and departed for France in early 1918. The regiment took part in fighting in the defensive sector of the Vosges Mountains, and later took part in the Meuse–Argonne offensive. After promotion to temporary captain, he commanded the regiment's Company H, and later Company F. Following promotion to temporary major, he commanded 3rd Battalion, 51st Infantry. Dager's wartime heroism was acknowledged with award of the silver Citation Star; when the Silver Star was created in the early 1930s, Dager's citation star was converted to the new medal.

Dager remained in Europe after the Armistice of November 11, 1918 ended war, and he performed duty during the Occupation of the Rhineland. After returning to the United States in 1920, he returned to his permanent rank of captain and was assigned as professor of military science and tactics at Clason Point Military Academy in East Bronx, New York. He remained at the academy until the end of 1924, when he was assigned as a student officer in the basic course at the United States Army Infantry School. After graduating, he was assigned to command Company K, 29th Infantry Regiment at Fort Benning, Georgia, and he later served as the regimental adjutant. In 1928, he returned to the Infantry School, this time as a student in the advanced course for officers. In 1929, Dager was posted to Fort Leavenworth and enrolled in the United States Army Command and General Staff College.

== Continued career ==
After graduating from the Command and General Staff College in 1931, Dager was promoted to major and assigned to the 65th Infantry Regiment in Puerto Rico, where he remained until 1934. He was briefly assigned as assistant operations officer (G-3) for the 1st Infantry Division at Fort Hamilton, New York. In late 1935, Dager was selected for attendance at the United States Army War College. After his 1936 graduation, he was assigned as an instructor at the Command and General Staff College. He remained on the faculty until 1940 and was promoted to lieutenant colonel in 1939. Early in 1940, Dager was assigned to command Special Troops Battalion, 1st Infantry Division at Fort Wadsworth, New York and also assigned as commander of the post.

In late 1941, Dager was assigned as assistant operations officer (G-3) on the staff of First United States Army at Governors Island, New York. As part of this duty, he assisted in authoring the scenarios used to plan and execute the Carolina and Louisiana Maneuvers. With the army anticipating U.S. entry into World War II, in early 1941 he was promoted to colonel and assigned to command the 41st Armored Infantry Regiment at Fort Benning. In September 1941, Dager was promoted to brigadier general and appointed to command Combat Command B, 8th Armored Division at Fort Knox, Kentucky.

== Later career ==
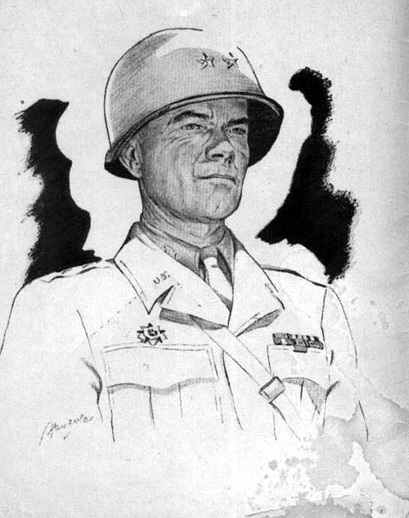
Dager as depicted in 1945's The Story of the Eleventh Armored Division: Thunderbolt

In early 1942, Dager was assigned to command Combat Command B, 4th Armored Division during the division's organization and training at Pine Camp, New York. After training in Tennessee and at Camp Bowie, Texas, the 4th Armored Division sailed for France. Dager remained in command of Combat Command B throughout its combat in France, including the Battle of the Bulge and the "race to the Rhine." When Third Army commander General George S. Patton famously urinated into the Rhine as a symbolic insult to Nazi Germany, it was Dager he addressed with "I've been waiting three long years to piss in this creek!"

Dager assumed command of the 11th Armored Division at Mayen, Germany in March 1945 and was promoted to temporary major general. He remained in command until September 1945, including combat in Germany and Austria as the division moved east and south, and which culminated with meeting the west-moving Soviet 7th Guards Airborne Division near Linz. Upon returning to the United States, he reverted to the rank of brigadier general and was assigned as director of training for the army's Fourth Service Command at Fort McPherson, Georgia. He later served as plans and training officer (G-3) of Seventh United States Army at Camp Shelby, Mississippi, and he served as Seventh Army's acting chief of staff on several occasions. From December 1946 to March 1947, Dager commanded U.S. Forces, Austria. In October 1947, Dager was found medically unfit for continued service and retired for disability.

== Awards ==
Dager's awards and decorations included:

- Distinguished Service Cross
- Army Distinguished Service Medal
- Silver Star with oak leaf cluster
- Legion of Merit
- Bronze Star Medal with 2 bronze oak leaf clusters
- World War I Victory Medal
- American Defense Service Medal
- American Campaign Medal
- European–African–Middle Eastern Campaign Medal
- World War II Victory Medal
- Presidential Unit Citation
- Legion of Honor (Chevalier) (France)
- Croix de Guerre with Palm (France)
- Order of the Patriotic War First Class (Union of Soviet Socialist Republics)

=== Distinguished Service Cross citation ===
For extraordinary heroism in connection with military operations on 31 July 1944 against an armed enemy at Avranches, France. When his own headquarters was surrounded on three sides by vastly superior numbers of the enemy, Brigadier General Dager took extraordinarily heroic action in the face of heavy odds, thereby saving his unit from annihilation and defeating the enemy. Upon being fired upon, he immediately organized the concentrated fire of his headquarters and ordered artillery fire on the enemy, who were so close that several rounds fell into the area occupied by his headquarters. General Dager personally organized a counter-attack of light tanks and armored cars. General Dager participated in all actions in his own light tank, alternately loading the 37mm gun and firing the 30. caliber machine gun. In addition to directing all operations, he directed the attack from the open turret of his tank in the face of a hail of enemy gun fire. This counter-attack into the enemy positions forced more than 2,000 Germans to surrender. During the entire engagement which lasted more than two hours, General Dager was in the midst of the extremely heavy fire, which destroyed three medium tanks, and one light tank and inflicted numerous casualties in personnel. His entire conduct in this action demonstrated unsurpassed personal valor, aggressiveness, and initiative.

Service: Army Division: 4th Armored Division General Orders: Headquarters, Third U.S. Army, General Orders No. 60 (1944)

== Effective dates of rank ==
Dager's effective dates of rank were:

- Second Lieutenant (National Guard), December 17, 1912 (Resigned, October 19, 1914)
- Second Lieutenant (federalized National Guard), September 10, 1916
- Second Lieutenant (Regular Army), June 23, 1917 (Date of rank March 6, 1917)
- First Lieutenant (Regular Army), June 23, 1917 (Date of rank March 6, 1917)
- Captain (National Army), March 28, 1918 (Date of rank August 5, 1917)
- Major, National Army, October 30, 1918
- Captain (Regular Army), September 1, 1920
- Major (Regular Army), January 10, 1930
- Lieutenant Colonel (Regular Army), August 15, 1939
- Colonel, (Army of the United States), December 11, 1941
- Brigadier General (Army of the United States), June 21, 1942
- Major General (Army of the United States), May 3, 1945
- Brigadier General (Army of the United States), April 30, 1946
- Major General (Retired), October 31, 1947

== Civilian career ==
In January 1948, Dager married Eleanora Benetzka of Reno, Nevada. From 1948 to 1950, Dager was a civilian intelligence officer on the staff of General Douglas MacArthur, Supreme Commander for the Allied Powers in post-war Japan. Dager then began a career with the Federal Civil Defense Administration (FCDA), first as a volunteer, and later as an executive and manager. His initial volunteer assignments included military liaison and civil defense advisor to the government of Nevada and assistant director of public information for the FCDA's Nevada office.

Dager later relocated to the FCDA's office in Battle Creek, Michigan, where he served as special assistant for planning to Val Peterson, the organization's director. In 1956, he was appointed director of the FCDA's natural disaster office, a predecessor of the Federal Emergency Management Agency. He later served as the FCDA's special assistant for military relationships with local and state governments. Dager retired from this post in December 1961, after which he resided in Arlington, Virginia.

In 1963, Dager's family was the subject of nationwide headlines when they succeeded at securing the Cold War-era release from her native Latvia of Eleanora Dager's mother Bronislawa. According to contemporary news accounts, Mrs. Dager had attempted to obtain permission for her mother to leave the Soviet-bloc country for more than 20 years. Dager died at Walter Reed Army Medical Center on July 24, 1973. He was buried at Arlington National Cemetery.
