= Henry W. Baird =

U.S. Army Commander

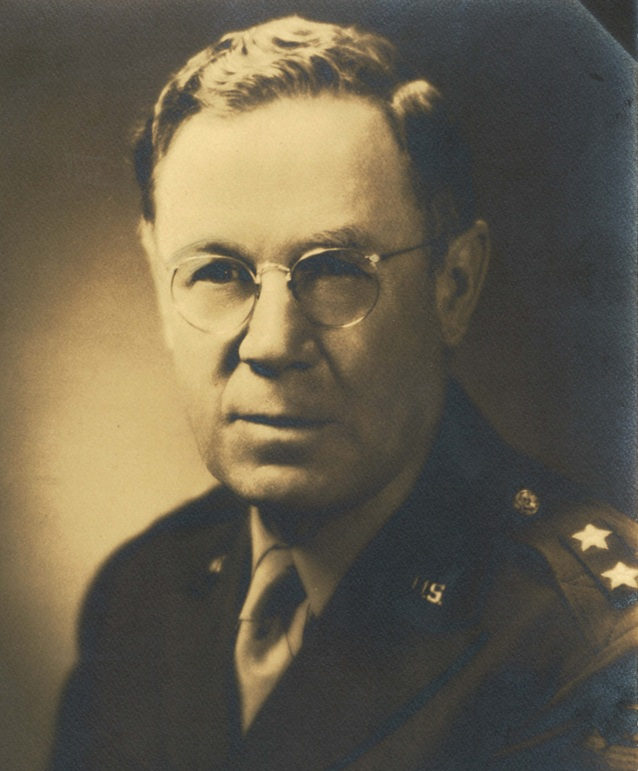
- Born: August 13, 1881
- Died: October 9, 1963 (aged 82)
- Burial place: Arlington Memorial Cemetery
- Military career
- Allegiance: United States
- Branch: U.S. Army
- Service years: 1904-1942
- Rank: Major General
- Service number: 0-2190
- Commands: 1st Cavalry Regiment 1st Armored Brigade 4th Armored Division

Signature
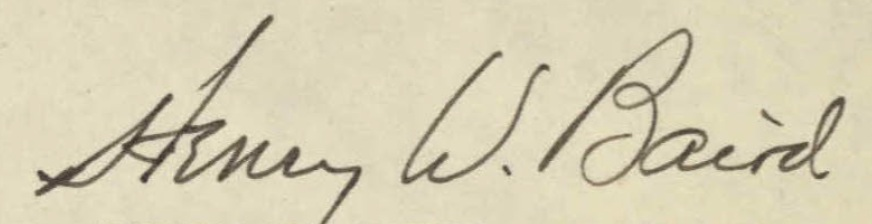

Henry Welles Baird (August 13, 1881 – October 9, 1963) was a United States Army officer. Serving from 1904 to 1942, he rose from the rank of private to major general. Before his retirement, he commanded the U.S. Army's 4th Armored Division.

== Early career ==
He began his army career in September 1904 as a private in Troop E of the 5th Cavalry under Captain William Johnston Jr.. He was commissioned as a second lieutenant on February 28, 1907. (Note: At this time, under an 1892 Act of Congress, enlisted soldiers meeting specified criteria could earn the rank of second lieutenant by passing a standardized examination.) While stationed at Fort Apache, Arizona, he participated in the 1908 Black Mountain expedition against the Navajo Indians in Arizona, New Mexico and Utah. (Note: In this expedition, the 5th Cavalry was ordered to respond to periodic attacks by the Navaho against settlers and livestock in a region north of Fort Apache. Lieutenant Baird and his troop served as sentry for the main body of the 5th Cavalry under Colonel George King Hunter as it ventured, in a show of force, to Four Corners to meet with Navaho chiefs. The expedition ended peaceably as the result of an agreement with the chiefs that they would desist from further hostile actions.)

Baird went on to serve with the 5th Cavalry at Fort Yellowstone in Wyoming, at Schofield Barracks, Hawaii, and at Fort Huachuca, Arizona. He attended the Mounted Service School in Fort Riley, Kansas in 1914-15 at the same time as George S. Patton. An accomplished horseman, he rode in the 1915 Madison Square Garden Horse Show. By October 1916, now with the 15th Cavalry, he became captain of cavalry while serving at Camp Stotsenberg in the Philippines. He became major of cavalry in August 1920. In 1923, he graduated from the Command and General Staff College at Fort Leavenworth, Kansas. However, he realized early in his army career with horses that "they were not going to win many wars," and went on to become a leading proponent of mechanized warfare.

== Later military service ==
=== Instructor and training administrator, Organized Reserves ===
From 1923 to 1935, Baird served in various training roles, including as Instructor with the Organized Reserves in Kansas City from 1924 to 1925; as Duty Office Chief of Cavalry, in Washington D.C. from 1926 to 1928; and as Executive Officer for Organized Reserve Affairs for the State of Florida from 1929 to 1934. In these capacities, he trained candidates in the Officers Reserve Corps, the Enlisted Reserve Corps and the Reserve Officers' Training Corps. He advanced to the permanent rank of Lieutenant Colonel in June 1930.

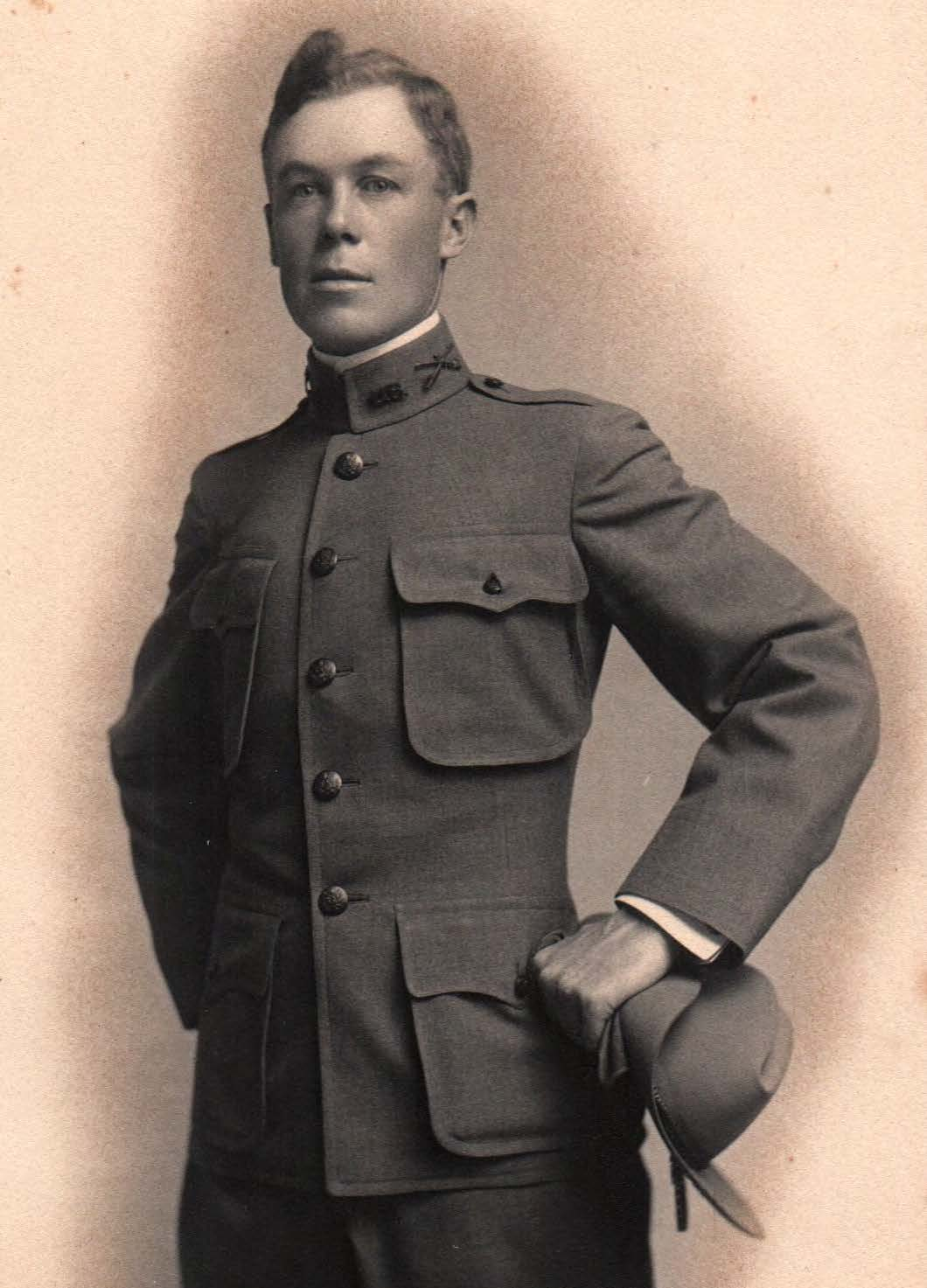
Commissioned as Second Lieutenant, 1907

=== Mechanized Cavalry ===
Following the 1934 Fort Riley Maneuvers, which focused on the potential tactical effectiveness of combined operations of horse and mechanized cavalry, Lieutenant Colonel Baird served as Executive Officer under General Bruce Palmer, the newly appointed commander of the 1st Cavalry Regiment (Mechanized) at Fort Knox, Kentucky. (Note: General Bruce Palmer (1878-1958) was the father of General Bruce Palmer, Jr. (1913-2000), who in 1972 became acting Chief of Staff, U.S. Army.) This regiment later become part of the 7th Cavalry Brigade. By August 1935 Baird had been named a colonel of cavalry.

Between 1935 and 1937, he was highly involved in the conversion of the 1st Cavalry Regiment from a mounted cavalry unit to a motorized armored unit. After the expansion of the 7th Cavalry Brigade into the 1st and 2nd Armored Divisions, he was named commanding officer of the 1st Cavalry Regiment of the 1st Armored Division in November 1938. At this time the 7th Calvary Brigade was commanded by Major General Daniel Van Voorhis, and Colonel Baird reported directly to Brigadier General Adna R. Chaffee, Jr. who commanded the 7th Mechanized Brigade. He remained in this position until the establishment of the Armored Force in 1940, when the U.S. Army’s mechanized force and related mechanized divisions were reorganized, along with associated training procedures. (Note: The Army’s 1939 mechanized cavalry training manual for the Infantry School at Fort Benning described the soon-to-be revised battlefield tactic of medium tanks supporting riflemen by attacking in successive waves and focusing on antitank weapons, with light tanks following with infantry to destroy encountered machine guns.)

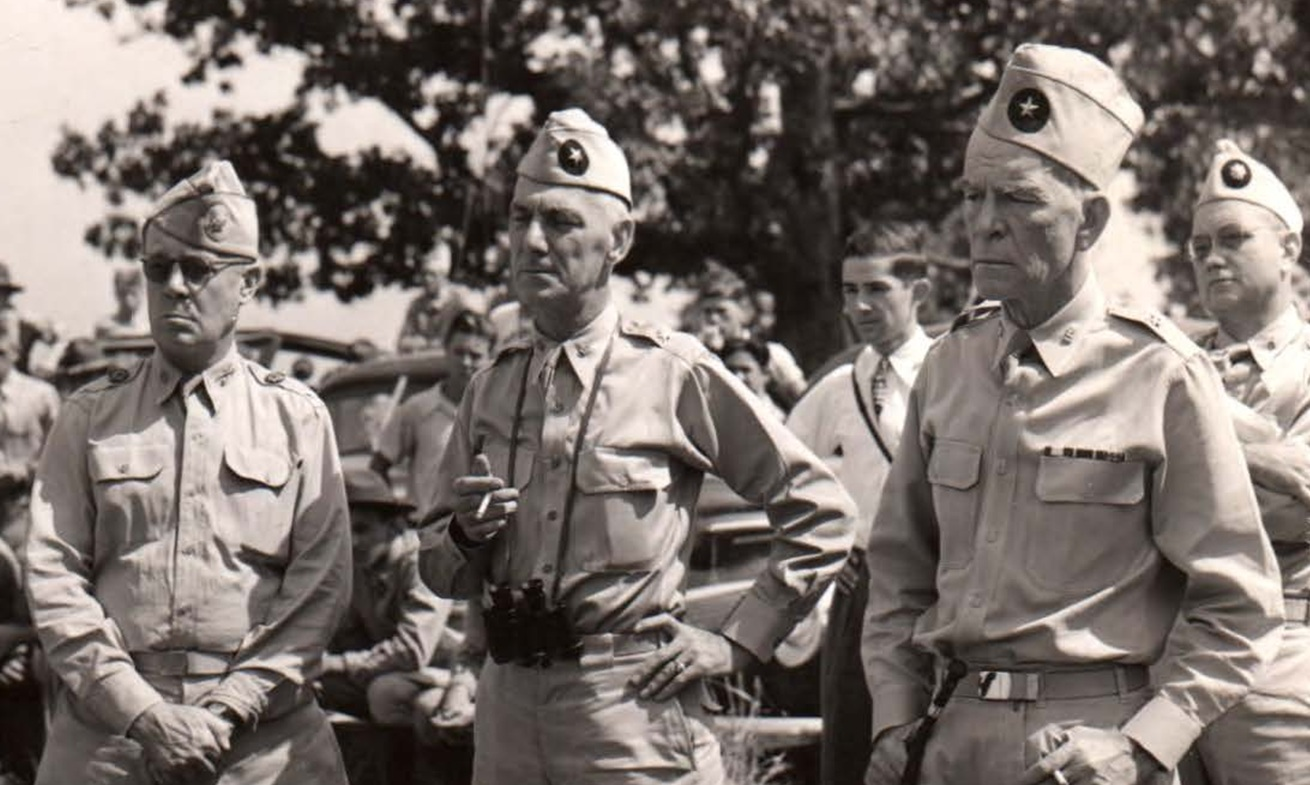
l - r: Henry Baird, Daniel Van Voorhis and Adna Chaffee, Jr. on maneuvers in 1939

=== 4th Armored Division Command at Pine Camp ===
The new Armored Force required officers familiar with the deployment of mechanized forces and skilled both in establishing new training programs and in developing new training facilities. In October 1940, Colonel Baird was promoted to the temporary rank of Brigadier General for the 1st Armored Brigade of the 1st Armored Division under Major General Bruce Magruder. Less than ten months later, on 11 July 1941, he was given the temporary rank of Major General three months after he assumed command of the newly created 4th Armored Division, which was initially based in Pine Camp, New York (later incorporated into the Fort Drum U.S. Army garrison). In fact, many of the division's first officers were brought in from the 1st Armored Division at Fort Knox. The Pine Camp training program subsequently supplied officers for other armored divisions while cultivating a pool of superior officer talent, including Creighton Abrams and Bruce C. Clarke.

His command duty with the division focused on overseeing a site development program at the Pine Camp facility funded largely by the Military Appropriations Act of 1941 and the Military Appropriations Act, 1942. While at Pine Camp, he developed and administered a training program for some 10,000 recruits. It was not until the end of 1941 that Pine Camp was supplied with tanks fully suitable for combat training. (Note: The training at this time used M2 light and medium tanks and, toward the end of 1941, the M-3 Lee, M-3 Grant, and M-3 Stuart medium tanks. But throughout 1941 and early 1942, the M-3 models remained in short supply for Pine Camp as well as for other training facilities at Fort Benning and Fort Bliss.) His leadership role with the program extended to the subsequent relocation of the 4th Armored Division to Camp Forrest in Tullahoma, Tennessee to participate in the I Corps Tennessee Maneuvers. This operation was held in the spring and summer of 1942 in the Tennessee Maneuver Area near the town of Carthage.

Now approaching retirement age, Major General Baird handed over command of the 4th Armored Division to Major General John Shirley Wood, a transition that began in late May 1942. After assuming command of the division, General Wood nominated General Baird for the Army's Legion of Merit, noting his outstanding achievements in the initial training and organization of the division. He stated that "I consider myself fortunate to have taken a division which was so well trained basically and which had such an outstanding spirit of devotion to duty and ceaseless effort to attaining perfection."

Upon his retirement in November 1942, General Baird's temporary one and two-star general ranks were administratively rescinded, and his rank reverted to colonel. On October 28, 1948, his rank was advanced on the retired list to major general.

== Family life and retirement ==
Henry Welles Baird was born August 13, 1881, on Kent Island, Queen Anne's County, Maryland to Henry Welles Baird (a Confederate Army cavalryman) and Mary Frances Willis Baird, on the same day as his identical twin brother, Alexander Straith Baird. He married Elizabeth Gould Tower on August 1, 1913, with whom he had three children: Elizabeth, Isabelle and Henry.

Upon retirement, from 1942 he resided principally in Florida. Beginning in 1943, he assisted in the organization of civil marine patrols along the Atlantic coast of south Florida. During the years 1946 to 1951, he served as a Director of Civilian Defense for Dade County Florida, and was mayor of Opa-locka from 1942 to 1948. His civic involvements included terms on the board of directors of Haileah-Miami Springs Bank, the Airport Bank of Miami and the Boys Club of Miami. He was also active in the Army and Navy Club of Washington, D.C. and Manilla, the 4th Armored Division Association, and the Army Athletic Association, and was a member of Miami Kiwanis and the American Legion.

He died on October 9, 1963, and was survived by his wife Elizabeth of 50 years, along with his two daughters, a son, and five grandsons. He was buried in Arlington National Cemetery.
