= 4th Armored Division (United States) =

Inactive US Army formation

- 4th Armored Division shoulder sleeve insignia
- Active: 13 January 1941–10 May 1971
- Country: United States
- Branch: United States Army
- Type: Armor
- Role: Armored warfare
- Size: Division
- Nicknames: "Breakthrough" (1954) "Name Enough" (Unofficial)
- Motto: "They shall be known by their deeds alone" (WWII)
- Colors: Red, Blue and Yellow
- Engagements: World War II; Normandy; Northern France; Rhineland; Ardennes-Alsace; Central Europe
- Decorations: Presidential Unit Citation; French Croix de Guerre with Palm (3)

Commanders
- Notable commanders: MG Henry W. Baird (4/41-5/42); MG John S. Wood (5/42-12/44); MG Hugh J. Gaffey (12/44-3/45); MG William M. Hoge (3-6/45); BG Bruce C. Clarke (6-7/45); BG William. L. Roberts (7-9/45); MG Fay B. Prickett (9/45-5/46); MG Thomas Trapnell (54-55); MG Leonard H. Kieley

Insignia
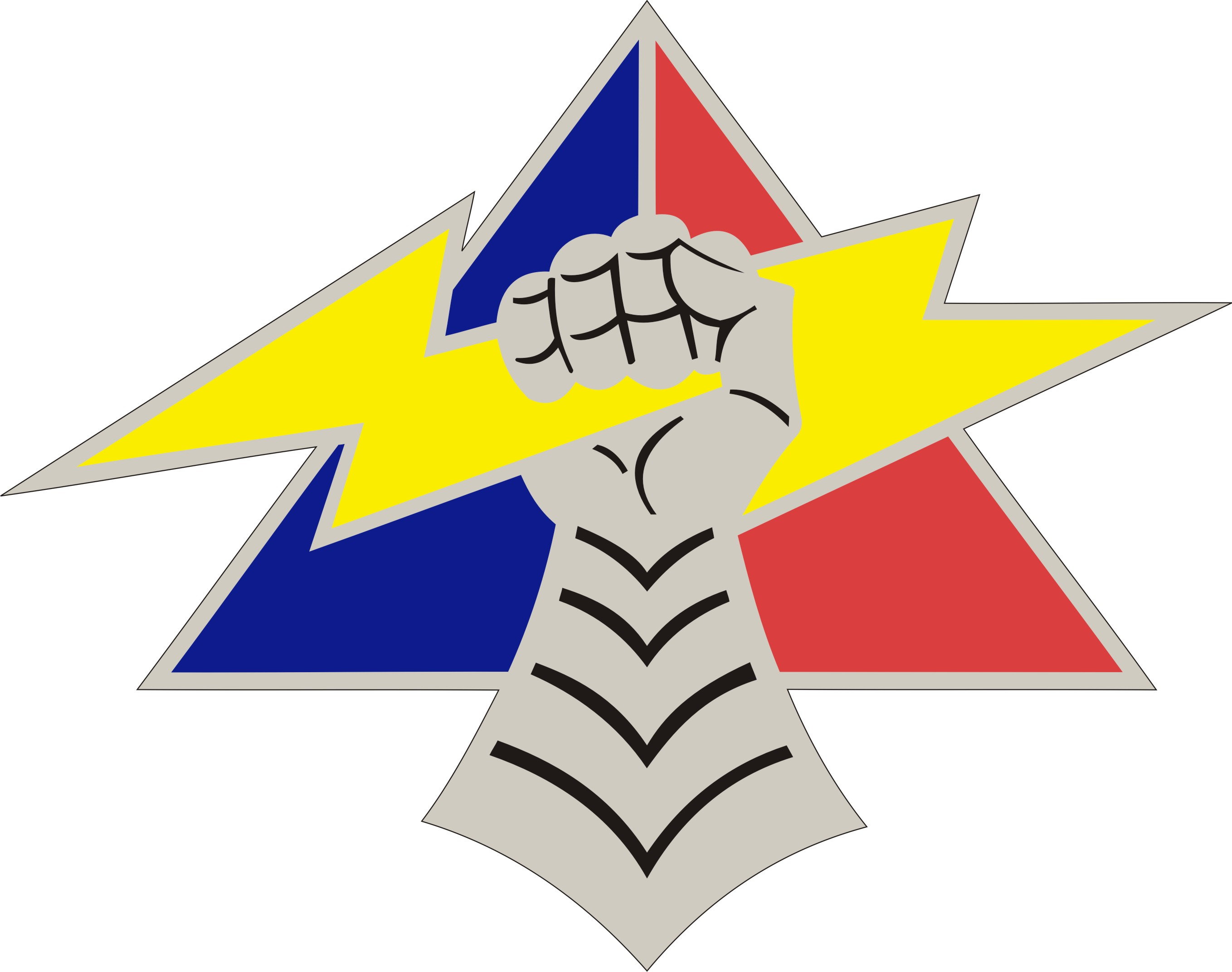
- Distinctive Unit Insignia
NATO Map Symbol
4

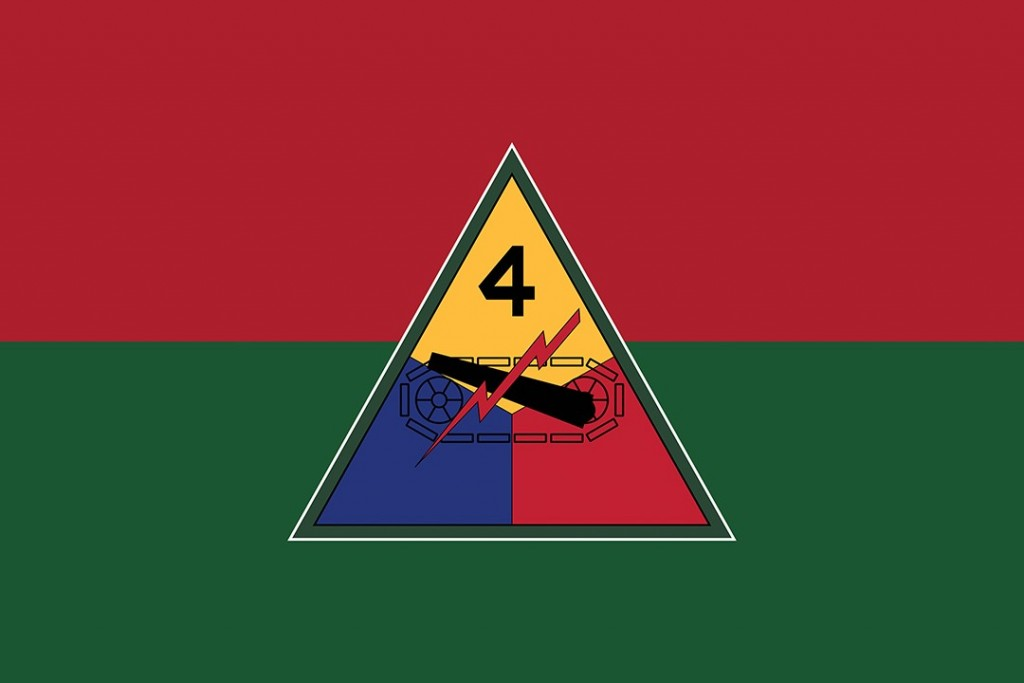
- Flag of the United States Army 4th Armored Division

The 4th Armored Division was an armored division of the United States Army that earned distinction while spearheading General Patton's Third Army in the European theater of World War II.

The 4th Armored Division, unlike most other U.S. armored divisions during World War II, did not officially adopt a nickname for the division during the war. However, their unofficial nickname "Name Enough" came into use postwar; the division commander having said, "Fourth Armored Division was name enough"; "They shall be known by their deeds alone." The 4th was named the "Breakthrough" division in 1954, but that name was eventually discontinued.

== History ==
The 4th Armored Division was activated prior to American entry into World War II on 15 April 1941 at Pine Camp, New York under the command of Brigadier General Henry W. Baird. The division was formed with a 3,800-man cadre from the 1st Armored Division, and was augmented during May with over 6,000 draftees chiefly hailing from the Northeastern, Mid-Atlantic, and Midwestern United States; the largest number, over 2,000, came from Fort Dix, New Jersey, with others from Fort Niagara and Camp Upton, New York, Camp Lee, Virginia, Fort George G. Meade, Maryland, Fort Thomas, Kentucky, Fort Hayes, Ohio, Fort Benjamin Harrison, Indiana, and the New Cumberland reception center, Pennsylvania. By July there were 12,000 men in the division. In October, the division furnished a cadre to form the 5th Armored Division.

=== World War II ===
The division was organized as a full Armored Division in May and June 1942 under the command of Major General John Shirley Wood. It left Pine Camp for Camp Forrest for the Tennessee maneuvers in the Cumberland Mountains held in September and October. In mid-November, it was transferred to the Camp Ibis Desert Training Center (DTC) in the California-Arizona maneuver area and was the first Armored Division to occupy Camp Ibis near Needles, California in the Mojave Desert, which was close to the Arizona and Nevada borders. On 3 June, the 4th AD arrived at Camp Bowie, Texas, an armored training center located in central Texas near Brownwood, for more maneuvers until about December when it departed for Camp Myles Standish in Massachusetts for winter training. On 29 December, the 4th AD departed Boston to conduct training in England in preparation for the invasion of Normandy.

==== France ====
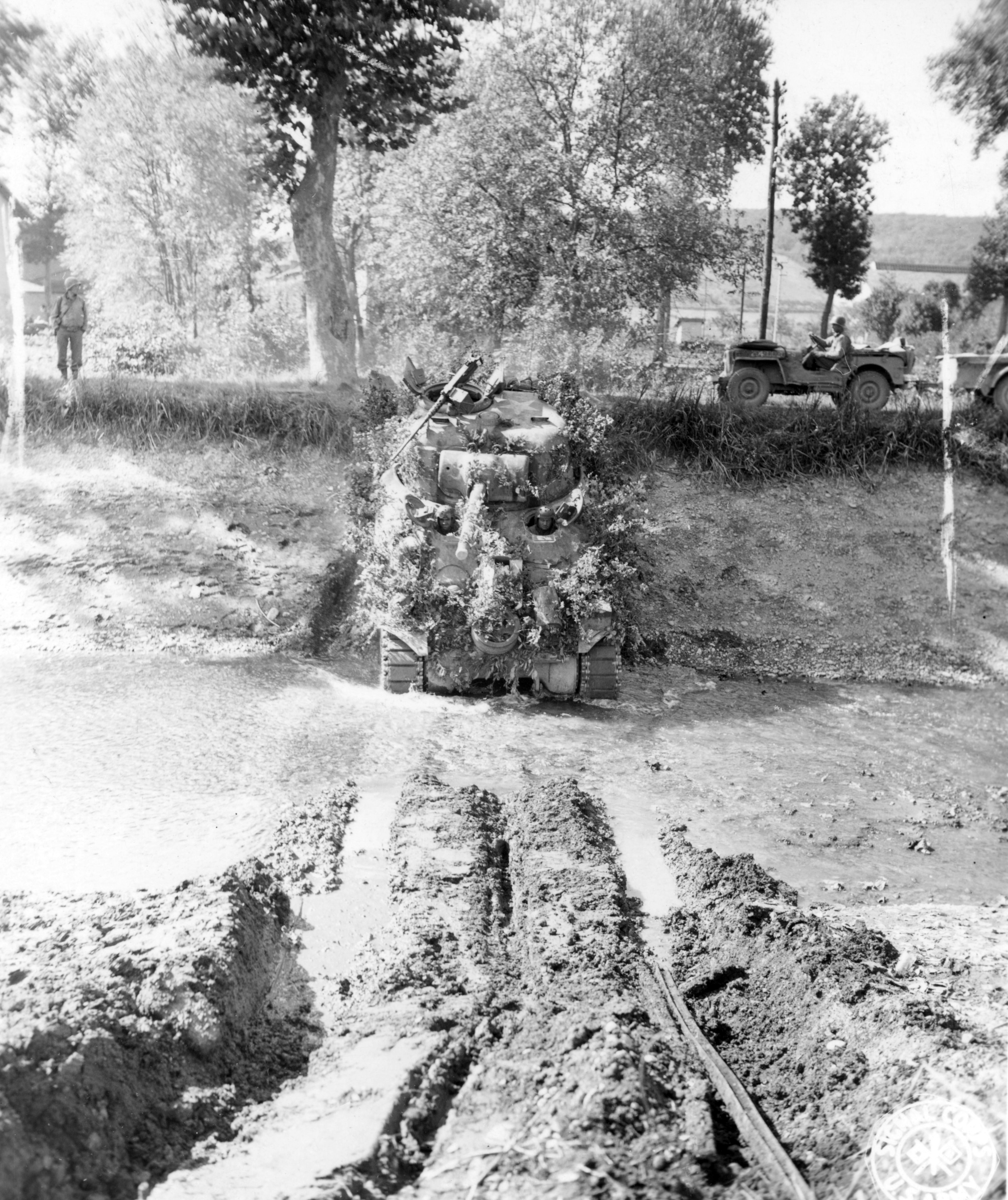
8th Tank Battalion, 4th Armored Division crossing a canal in France, 12 September 1944

After training in England from January to July 1944, the 4th Armored Division landed at Utah Beach, on 11 July, over a month after the initial Normandy landings, and first entered combat on 17 July; on 28 July, battle action as part of the VIII Corps exploitation force for Operation Cobra, the 4th AD secured the Coutances area. The 4th AD then swung south to take Nantes, cutting off the Brittany Peninsula, 12 August 1944. Turning east, it drove swiftly across France north of the Loire, smashed across the Moselle 11–13 September, flanked Nancy and captured Lunéville, 16 September. The 4th AD fought several German panzergrenadier brigades in the Lorraine area (Rechicourt) including the SS Panzergrenadier Brigade 49 and SS Panzergrenadier Brigade 51 at this time, defeating a larger German force through superior tactics and training.

After maintaining a defensive line, Chambrey to Xanrey to Hénaménil, from 27 September to 11 October, the 4th AD rested briefly before returning to combat 9 November with an attack in the vicinity of Viviers. The 4th AD cleared Bois de Serres, 12 November, advanced through Dieuze and crossed the Saar River, 21–22 November, to establish and expand bridgehead and took Singling and Bining, then Baerendorf 24 November, before being relieved 8 December.

The 4th Armored Division received the following unit awards from France: Croix de Guerre with Palm (27–29 July 1944), Croix de Guerre with Palm (12–29 September 1944), and French Fourragere in the colors of the Croix de Guerre.

==== Battle of the Bulge ====
Two days after the Germans launched their Ardennes Offensive, the 4th AD entered the fight (18 December 1944), racing northwest into Belgium, covering 150 miles in 19 hours. The 4th AD, spearheading Patton's Third Army, attacked the Germans at Bastogne and, on 26 December, Brigadier General Herbert L. Earnest's Combat Command A led the column that relieved Bastogne during the Battle of the Bulge, with Company C, 37th Tank Battalion in the vanguard. to break through at Bastogne and relieve the besieged 101st Airborne Division. Six weeks later the 4th AD jumped off from Luxembourg City in an eastward plunge that carried it across the Moselle River at Trier, south, and east to Worms, and across the Rhine, 24–25 March 1945. Advancing all night, the 4th AD crossed the Main River the next day, south of Hanau, and continued to push on. Lauterbach fell 29 March, Creuzburg across the Werra on 1 April, Gotha on 4 April – where the 4th AD liberated Ohrdruf concentration camp, the first Nazi camp liberated by U.S. troops. Both Generals Patton and Eisenhower visited the camp. And the U.S. Army recognized the division with the special designation "Liberators" in 1985. By 12 April the 4th AD was across the Saale River. Pursuit of the enemy continued, and by 6 May the division had crossed into Czechoslovakia and established a bridgehead across the Otava River at Strakonice, with forwarding elements at Písek. The 4th AD was reassigned to the XII Corps on 30 April 1945. The 4th AD received the following Letter of Commendation:

To: Maj. Gen. Hugh J. Gaffey The outstanding celerity of your movement and the unremitting, vicious and skillful manner in which you pushed the attack, terminating at the end of four days and nights of incessant battle in the relief of Bastogne, constitutes one of the finest chapters in the glorious history of the United States Army. You and the officers and men of your command are hereby commended for a superior performance.

Lt. Gen. George S. Patton, Jr., Commander, Third U.S. Army

The 4th AD's second commander, Major General John Shirley Wood, (known as "P" Wood to his contemporaries, the "P" standing for "Professor", and "Tiger Jack" to his men) who took over the division officially on 18 June 1942, trained the 4th Armored Division for two years before he personally led it into combat in France, on 28 July 1944, and was awarded the Distinguished Service Cross. On 1 August, Gen. George Patton's U.S. Third Army became operational and the 4th AD became the spearhead of the Third Army. The British military armor theorist and historian, Capt. Basil Henry Liddell Hart, once referred to General Wood as "the Rommel of the American armored forces." Like Rommel, Wood commanded from the front, and preferred staying on the offensive, using speed and envelopment tactics to confuse the enemy. General Wood often utilized a light Piper Cub liaison aircraft flown by his personal pilot, Maj. Charles "Bazooka Charlie" Carpenter, to keep up with his rapidly moving division, sometimes personally carrying corps orders from headquarters directly to his advancing armored columns.

On 3 December 1944, General Wood was relieved as division commander. The division was then led by Major General Hugh Gaffey through the Battle of the Bulge until March 23, when Brigadier General William M. Hoge (later Major General) was awarded command. Major General Fay B. Prickett commanded during the occupation period. Major General Archibald R. Kennedy commanded the division after the war.

Among the most famous members of the 4th AD during World War II was Creighton Abrams, who commanded the 37th Tank Battalion. Abrams later rose to command all U.S. forces in South Vietnam during the Vietnam War and served as Army Chief of Staff in the 1970s. The M-1 tank is named after him. Abrams' friend, Harold Cohen, commanded the 10th Armored Infantry Battalion and fought in concert with Abrams' tanks.

=== Division organization ===
==== Initial division organization ====
When the 4th Armored Division was formed on 15 April 1941 it was composed of the following units:

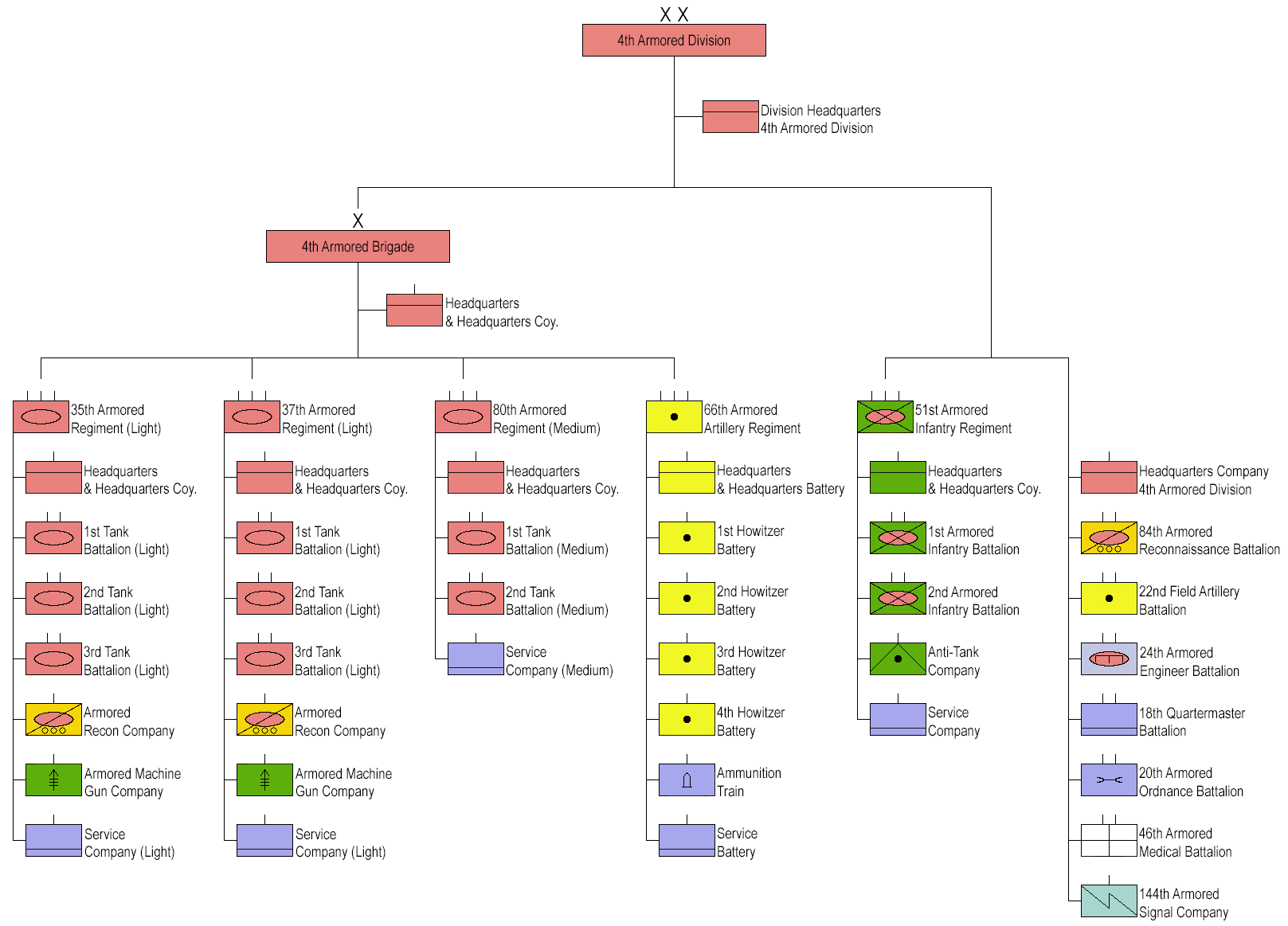
4th Armored Division initial organization (click to enlarge)

- 4th Armored Division
  - Division Headquarters
  - Headquarters Company, 4th Armored Division
  - 144th Armored Signal Company
  - 4th Armored Brigade
    - Headquarters and Headquarters Company
    - 35th Armored Regiment (Light)
      - Headquarters and Headquarters Company
      - Armored Reconnaissance Company (M3 scout cars)
      - Armored Machine Gun Company (M2 half-track cars and M1919 .30-caliber machine guns)
      - Service Company (Light)
      - 3× Tank battalions (Light)
        - each battalion consists of: 1× Headquarters and Headquarters Platoon, 3× tank companies with M3 Stuart light tanks
    - 37th Armored Regiment (Light)
      - same organization as 35th Armored Regiment (Light)
    - 80th Armored Regiment (Medium) (transferred in April 1942 to the 8th Armored Division)
      - Headquarters and Headquarters Company
      - Service Company (Medium)
      - 2× Tank battalions (Medium)
        - each battalion consists of: 1× Headquarters and Headquarters Platoon, 3× tank companies with M3 Lee medium tanks
    - 66th Armored Field Artillery Regiment
      - Headquarters and Headquarters Battery
        - 4× Field artillery batteries (24× M2 105mm towed howitzers)
      - Ammunition Train
      - Service Battery
  - 51st Armored Infantry Regiment
    - Headquarters and Headquarters Company
    - 2× Armored infantry battalions
      - each battalion consists of: 1× Headquarters and Headquarters Platoon, 3× Rifle companies on M3 half-tracks, and 1× Heavy Weapons Company with M3 37mm Anti-Tank guns and M4 mortar carriers
    - Anti-Tank Company (M3 37mm Anti-Tank guns)
    - Service Company
  - 84th Armored Reconnaissance Battalion
    - Headquarters and Headquarters Detachment
    - 2× Armored reconnaissance companies (M3 scout cars)
    - Light Tank Company (M3 Stuart light tanks)
    - Armored Reconnaissance Rifle Company (M3 half-tracks)
  - 22nd Field Artillery Battalion
    - Headquarters and Headquarters Battery
    - 3× Field artillery batteries (12× M2 105mm towed howitzers)
    - Anti-Tank Gun Battery (8× M1897 75mm anti-tank guns)
    - Service Battery
  - 24th Armored Engineer Battalion
    - Headquarters and Headquarters Company
    - 3× Armored engineer companies
    - Bridge Company
  - 18th Quartermaster Battalion
    - Headquarters and Headquarters Company
    - Quartermaster Truck Company
    - Light Maintenance Quartermaster Company
  - 20th Armored Ordnance Battalion
    - Headquarters and Headquarters Company
    - 2× Ordnance companies
  - 46th Armored Medical Battalion
    - Headquarters and Headquarters Detachment
    - Medical Collecting Company
    - Medical Clearing Company
    - Division Surgeon's Office

==== Heavy armored division ====
The Louisiana Maneuvers in August and September 1941 had a profound impact on the organization of US armored division. The exercises exposed that the existing armored divisions were too heavy in armor and too light in infantry and artillery. Additionally the divisions lacked the resources to organize combat teams, while the armored brigade complicated the command channel. It was also found that the division's service elements needed greater control. As a result the Table of Organization of armored divisions was radically reorganized: the armored brigade headquarter was eliminated. The number of armored regiments was reduced from three to two, and the two remaining armored regiments were reorganized to consist of one light and two medium tank battalions each. Three self-propelled 105mm howitzer battalions replaced the armored artillery regiment and field artillery battalion, and control of the artillery passed to an artillery section in the division headquarters. The armored infantry regiment was reorganized to consist of three battalions of three companies each. The engineer battalion added a fourth engineer company. Each divisions also formed two combat command headquarters, which did not have assigned units, but allowed the division commander to assemble combat teams as required. The quartermaster battalion was replaced by a supply battalion, while the ordnance battalion added a third ordnance maintenance company. For better control of the division's service elements, division trains were added. To support the division headquarters company a service company was formed, which provided transportation and supplies, and included the division's military police platoon.

After the reorganization the 4th Armored Division was composed of the following units:

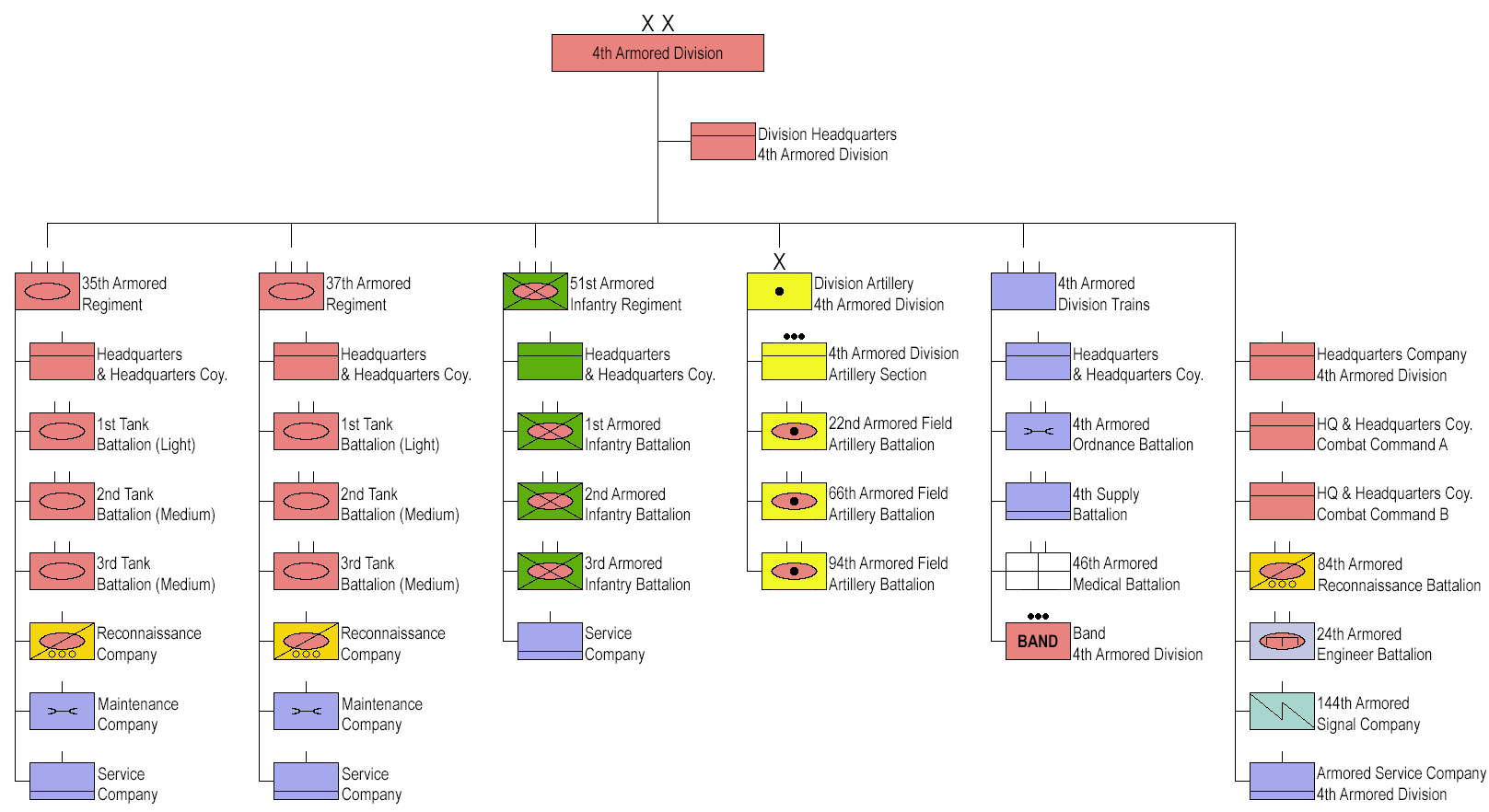
4th Armored Division organization as a heavy armored division (click to enlarge)

- 4th Armored Division
  - Division Headquarters
  - Headquarters Company, 4th Armored Division
  - Headquarters and Headquarters Company, Combat Command A
  - Headquarters and Headquarters Company, Combat Command B
  - 144th Armored Signal Company
  - Armored Service Company (includes the division's Military Police Platoon)
  - 35th Armored Regiment
    - Headquarters and Headquarters Company
    - Reconnaissance Company (M3 scout cars and T30 HMC self propelled guns)
    - Maintenance Company
    - Service Company
    - 1st Tank Battalion (Light)
      - Headquarters and Headquarters Company
      - 3× Light Tank companies (A, B, C) (M3/M5 Stuart light tanks)
    - 2nd Tank Battalion (Medium)
      - Headquarters and Headquarters Company
      - 3× Medium Tank companies (D, E, F) (M4 Sherman tanks)
    - 3rd Tank Battalion (Medium)
      - Headquarters and Headquarters Company
      - 3× Medium Tank companies (G, H, I) (M4 Sherman tanks)
  - 37th Armored Regiment
    - same organization as 35th Armored Regiment
  - 51st Armored Infantry Regiment
    - Headquarters and Headquarters Company
    - 3× Armored infantry battalions
      - each battalion consists of: 1× Headquarters and Headquarters Company, 3× Rifle companies on M3 half-tracks
    - Service Company
  - 84th Armored Reconnaissance Battalion
    - Headquarters and Headquarters Company
    - 3× Reconnaissance companies (M3 scout cars)
    - Light Tank Company (M3/M5 Stuart)
  - 24th Armored Engineer Battalion
    - Headquarters and Headquarters Company
    - 4× Armored engineer companies
    - Bridge Company
  - 4th Armored Division Artillery
    - 4th Armored Division Artillery Section
    - 22nd Armored Field Artillery Battalion
      - Headquarters and Headquarters Battery
      - 3× Field artillery batteries (M7 Priest self propelled howitzers)
      - Service Company
    - 66th Armored Field Artillery Battalion
      - same organization as 22nd Armored Field Artillery Battalion
    - 94th Armored Field Artillery Battalion
      - same organization as 22nd Armored Field Artillery Battalion
  - 4th Armored Division Trains
    - Headquarters and Headquarters Company
    - 4th Armored Ordnance Battalion
      - Headquarters and Headquarters Company
      - 3× Maintenance companies
    - 4th Supply Battalion
      - Headquarters and Headquarters Company
      - 2× Truck companies
    - 46th Armored Medical Battalion
      - Headquarters and Headquarters Company
      - 3× Medical companies
    - 4th Armored Division Band

==== Light armored division ====
Early in 1943, the Army Ground Force began a series of studies to reorganize the various divisions within the Army. After reviewing the tables of organization and after allowing the various commands to review and comment on the proposed restructure, the War Department published on 15 September 1943 a new armored division tables of organization. The restructuring removed the two armored regiments and armored infantry regiment from the table of organization and replaced them with three tank battalions and three armored infantry battalions. Each tank battalion included one light and three medium tank companies. Both Combat Commands, A and B, remained, but an additional Reserve Command was added to the organization. This was a small headquarters element of 10 personnel tasked to clarify command and control in the division's rear area. Armored engineer battalions lost their bridge companies, while their engineer companies were reduced from four to three. The division's cavalry reconnaissance squadron was increased in size to include an HQ Troop, four reconnaissance troops, a light tank company, and an assault gun troop of four platoons (one for each reconnaissance troop). Within the division trains, the division lost its supply battalion and the division's armored service company. These changes pared the division's strength from 14,630 men to 10,937, slashed the number of tanks from 360 to 263, reduced the variety of vehicles to ease repair problems, and eliminated the maintenance-prone motorcycles.

After its reorganization as a light armored division the 4th Armored Division was composed of the following units:

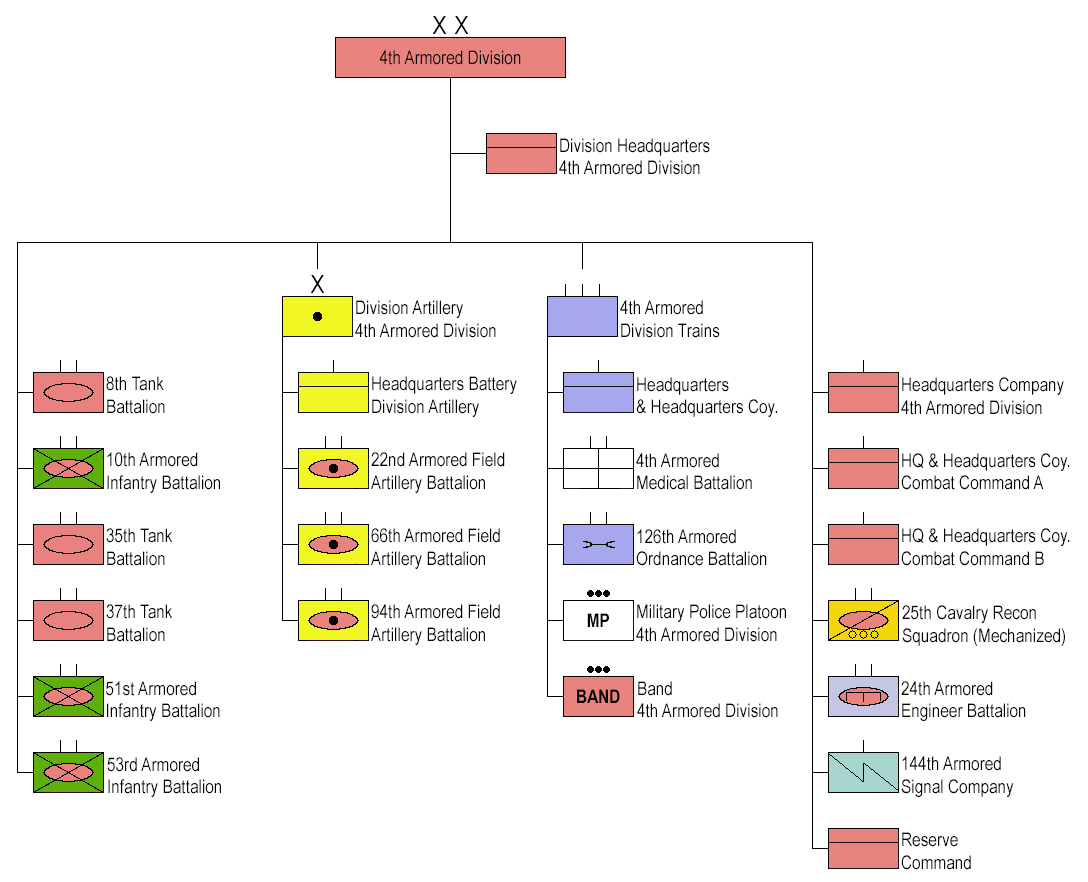
4th Armored Division organization as a light armored division (click to enlarge)

- 4th Armored Division
  - Division Headquarters
  - Headquarters Company, 4th Armored Division
  - Headquarters and Headquarters Company, Combat Command A
  - Headquarters and Headquarters Company, Combat Command B
  - 144th Armored Signal Company
  - Reserve Command
  - 8th Tank Battalion
    - Headquarters and Headquarters Company
    - 3× Medium Tank companies (M4 Sherman tanks)
    - Light Tank Company (M3/M5 Stuart or M24 Chaffee light tanks)
    - Service Company
  - 35th Tank Battalion
    - same organization as 8th Tank Battalion
  - 37th Tank Battalion
    - same organization as 8th Tank Battalion
  - 10th Armored Infantry Battalion
    - Headquarters and Headquarters Company
    - 3× Rifle companies (M3 half-tracks)
    - Service Company
  - 51st Armored Infantry Battalion
    - same organization as 10th Armored Infantry Battalion
  - 53rd Armored Infantry Battalion
    - same organization as 10th Armored Infantry Battalion
  - 25th Cavalry Reconnaissance Squadron (Mechanized)
    - Headquarters and Headquarters and Service Troop
    - 4× Cavalry reconnaissance troops (M8 Greyhound armored cars)
    - Cavalry Assault Gun Troop (M8 Scott self propelled guns)
    - Light Tank Company (M3/M5 Stuart or M24 Chaffee light tanks)
  - 24th Armored Engineer Battalion
    - Headquarters and Headquarters Company
    - 3× Armored engineer companies
  - 4th Armored Division Artillery
    - Headquarters and Headquarters Battery
    - 22nd Armored Field Artillery Battalion
      - Headquarters and Headquarters Battery
      - 3× Field artillery batteries (M7 Priest self propelled howitzers)
      - Service Battery
    - 66th Armored Field Artillery Battalion
      - same organization as 22nd Armored Field Artillery Battalion
    - 94th Armored Field Artillery Battalion
      - same organization as 22nd Armored Field Artillery Battalion
  - 4th Armored Division Trains
    - Headquarters and Headquarters Company
    - 46th Armored Medical Battalion
      - Headquarters and Headquarters Company
      - 3× Medical companies
    - 126th Armored Ordnance Battalion
      - Headquarters and Headquarters Company
      - 3× Maintenance companies
    - Military Police Platoon
    - 4th Armored Division Band

=== Post-war ===
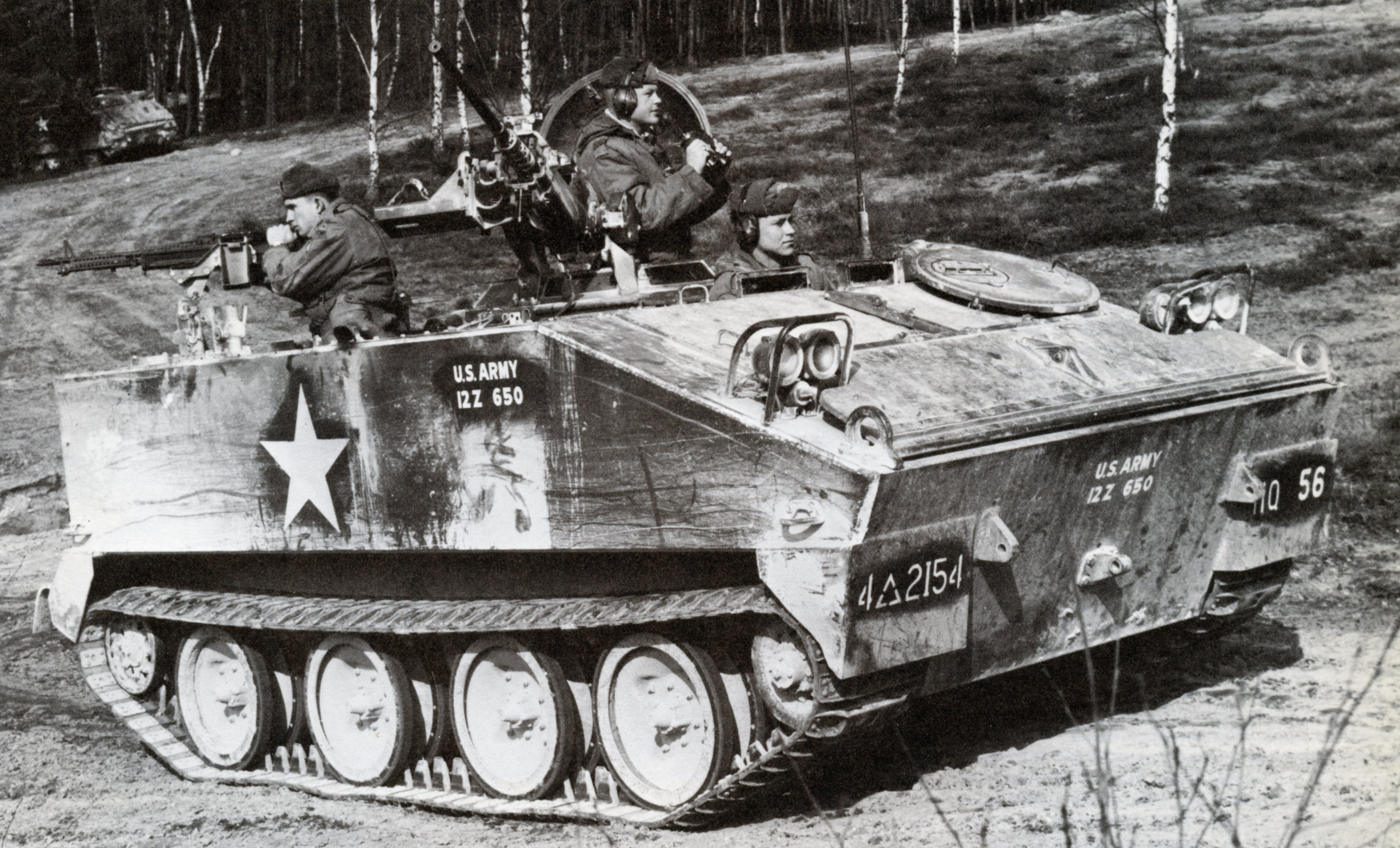
M114A1 of the Armored Cavalry Platoon 2/54th Infantry, 4th Armored Division takes part in exercises in Grafenwöhr, Germany.

The division remained as occupation forces in Germany after redesignation as the First Constabulary Brigade. In 1949, it was redesignated back to 4th Armored Division and inactivated on 20 May 1949.

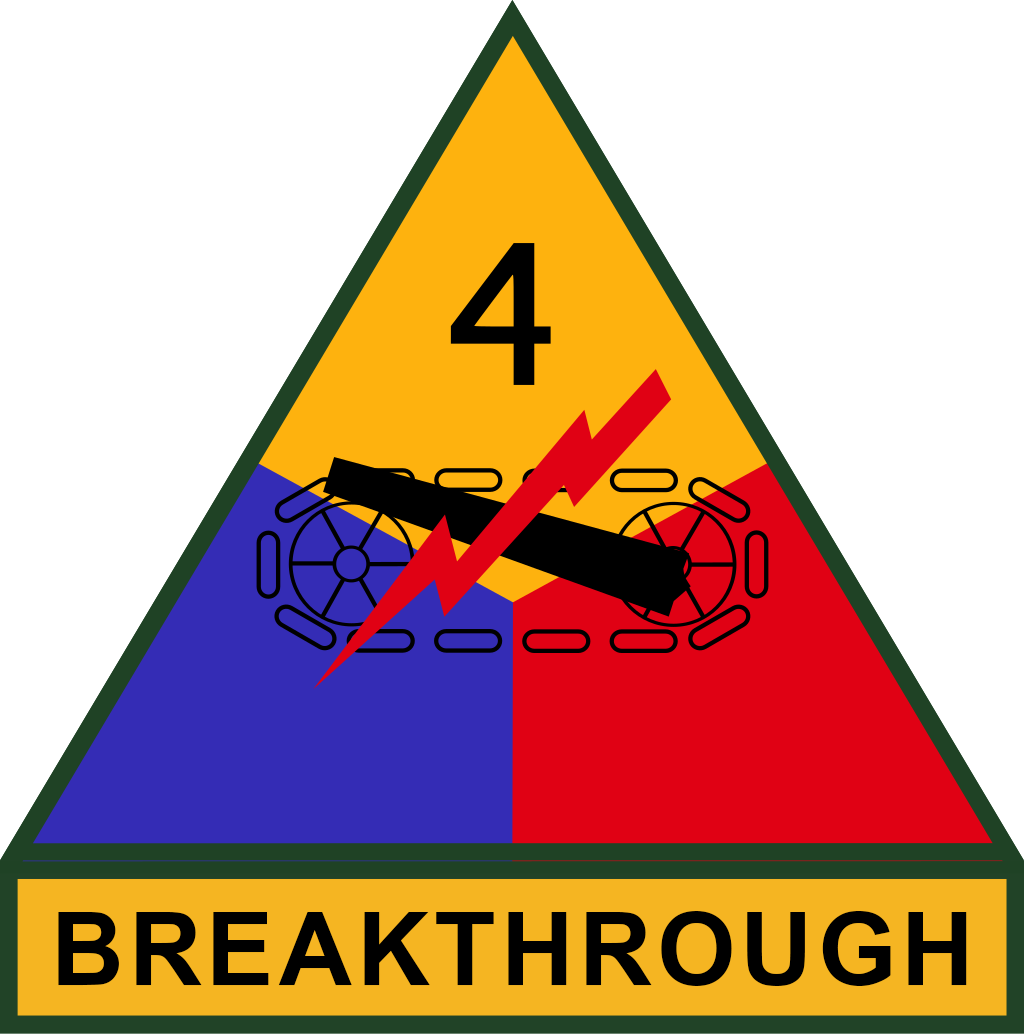
4th Armored Division "Breakthrough" Insignia

The 4th AD was reactivated on 15 June 1954 at Fort Hood in Killeen, Texas with the name 4th Armored "Breakthrough" Division ("Breakthrough" was discontinued some years afterwards). In late 1957, the 4th AD was rotated to West Germany as part of Operation Gyroscope, replacing the 2nd Armored Division. Cooke Barracks in Göppingen served as the division headquarters.

Combat Command "A" was located at Wiley Barracks, New Ulm. It comprised 2d Medium Tank Battalion (MTB), 66th Armor (Leipheim); 2d Armored Rifle Battalion (ARB), 41st Infantry (Neu Ulm); and 2d Armored Rifle Battalion, 51st Infantry. Combat Command "B" was at Ferris Barracks, Erlangen, comprising the 1st MTB, 35th Armor (Ferris Barracks); 2d MTB, 67th Armor (Fürth); 2d ARB, 50th Infantry (Ferris Barracks); and 2d Reconnaissance Squadron, 15th Cavalry. Combat Command "C" was at McKee Barracks, Crailsheim. It comprised 1st MTB, 37th Armor (McKee Barracks) and 1st ARB, 54th Infantry.

The 4th AD remained in Germany until final inactivation in May 1971, when it was reflagged as the 1st Armored Division.

=== In popular culture ===
In Harold Coyle's 1993 techno-thriller "The Ten Thousand", the 4th Armored Division forms part of the US Army Tenth Corps, and much of the novel's action is depicted from the point of view of members of the division.

== List of Commanding Generals during the Cold War ==
- Maj-Gen Andrew P. O'Meara (1 Aug 1957 – 13 Feb 1959)
- Maj-Gen James B. Quill (14 Feb 1959 – 1 Apr 1960)
- Maj-Gen John K. Waters (2 Apr 1960 – 27 Aug 1961)
- Maj-Gen James H. Polk (28 Aug 1961 – 30 Nov 1962)
- Maj-Gen John F. Franklin Jr. (1 Dec 1962 – 31 May 1964)
- Maj-Gen Alexander D. Surles Jr. (1 Jun 1964 – 17 Dec 1965)
- Maj-Gen James W. Sutherland (18 Dec 1965 – 23 May 1967)
- Maj-Gen Edward C. D. Scherrer (24 May 1967 – 2 Dec 1968)
- Maj-Gen Stephen W. Downey Jr. (3 Dec 1968 – 4 Feb 1970)
- Maj-Gen William W. Cobb (5 Feb 1970 – 10 May 1971)

== WWII names ==
American

- The Rolling 4th
- Flying 4th
- Phantom 4th
- Ghost Division
- Fire Alarm Division

German

- American Elite Fourth Armored Division
- Roosevelt's Butchers (by Nazi propagandists)

== WWII statistics ==
Casualties

- Total battle casualties: 6,212
- Killed in action: 1,143
- Wounded in action: 4,551
- Missing in action: 65
- Prisoners of war: 453

Medal of Honor recipients

- James H. Fields
- James R. Hendrix
- Joseph J. Sadowski

Unit awards

The 4th Armored Division was the first U.S. Armored Division to be awarded the Presidential Unit Citation:

- Presidential Unit Citation (Army), World War II (ARDENNES, 22 December 1944 – 27 March 1945; WD GO 54, 1945)
- French Croix de Guerre with Palm, World War II (NORMANDY, 27–30 July 1944; DA GO 43, 1950)
- French Croix de Guerre with Palm, World War II (MOSELLE RIVER, 12–29, September 1944; DA GO 43, 1950)
- French Fourragere (Croix de Guerre colors), World War II (DA GO 43, 1950)

Assignments

1. First United States Army: 18 December 1943
2. VIII Corps: 22 January 1944
3. XX Corps: 9 March 1944
4. XV Corps: 20 April 1944
5. VIII Corps: 15 July 1944
6. XII Corps: 13 August 1944
7. III Corps: 19 December 1944
8. VIII Corps: 2 January 1945
9. XII Corps: 12 January 1945
10. VIII Corps: 4 April 1945
11. X Corps: 9 April 1945
12. VIII Corps: 17 April 1945

== See also ==
- Divisions of the United States Army
