= Harold Cohen (soldier) =

United States Army officer during World War II (1916–2006)

- Born: October 2, 1916; Woodruff, South Carolina
- Died: August 15, 2006 (aged 89) Tifton, Georgia
- Branch: United States Army
- Service years: 1942–1945
- Rank: Lieutenant Colonel
- Commands: 10th Armored Infantry Battalion, 4th Armored Division, 3rd Army
- Conflicts: World War II; Battle of the Bulge; Battle of Arracourt; Siege of Bastogne; Lorraine Campaign; Operation Plunder; Western Allied invasion of Germany
- Awards: Silver Star (4); Bronze Star (3); Purple Heart (3); Distinguished Service Cross

Harold Cohen (October 2, 1916 – August 15, 2006) was an American soldier who fought in France and Germany during World War II. He rose to the rank of lieutenant colonel in the United States Army and commanded the 10th Armored Infantry Battalion of the 4th Armored Division. Cohen received four Silver Stars, three Bronze Stars, three Purple Hearts, the Legion of Merit, the French Croix de Guerre, and the Distinguished Service Cross. He was a friend of future Army chief-of-staff Creighton Abrams.

== Early life and enlistment ==
Cohen was born in Woodruff, South Carolina, on October 2, 1916, the son of a Lithuanian Jewish immigrant. He grew up in Spartanburg, South Carolina. Cohen attempted to enlist in the US Army after the Japanese attack on Pearl Harbor in 1941 but was repeatedly rejected due to his poor vision. He ultimately signed a waiver to enlist as a private in 1942. He deployed to England in 1944 as the supply officer for the 10th Armored Infantry Battalion, holding the rank of major.

== World War II service ==
Thirty-eight days after D-Day, Cohen's battalion landed in France and started fighting its way eastward as part of the 4th Armored Division in General Patton's Third Army. After battalion commander Arthur L. West was wounded, Cohen took command, receiving a battlefield promotion to lieutenant colonel. He befriended Colonel Creighton Abrams, who commanded a tank battalion in the same division. The two units fought in tandem, with Cohen's infantry riding along on Abrams' Sherman tanks or following them on half-tracks. The Wehrmacht feared these deadly combined arms, posting signs and leaflets warning Germans to beware of Abrams and Cohen, "Roosevelt’s Highest Paid Butchers."

Cohen fought in the Battle of Arracourt, clashes at Lezey and Juvelize, the siege of Bastogne, the Lorraine campaign, and Operation Plunder. On February 25, 1945, he exposed himself to enemy fire to direct artillery and tank fire while leading a successful assault on Brecht, Germany. On Patton's orders, Cohen organized a raid behind enemy lines to rescue Patton's son-in-law, Lt. Col. John Waters, from the Hammelburg prison camp, but Cohen's excruciating hemorrhoids prevented him from leading the doomed March 26 raid. When Cohen presented his hemorrhoids for a skeptical Patton's inspection, the general exclaimed, "That's some sorry ass."

On April 1, 1945, Cohen was captured when the Sixth SS Mountain Division overran the vicinity of the field hospital where he had been receiving treatment for his hemorrhoids. The Germans interrogated and threatened him but did not harm him. He was liberated within days when American forces counter-attacked and destroyed the German formations. Abrams reportedly wept when he saw his friend, whom the Americans feared had been executed.

During his deployment, Cohen received four Silver Stars, three Bronze Stars, three Purple Hearts, and the Legion of Merit. He received the French Croix de Guerre and decorations from the governments of Czechoslovakia, United Kingdom, Luxembourg, and Poland. He was nominated for the Distinguished Service Cross for "extraordinary heroism" during the attack on Brecht, but the nomination languished for decades for reasons unknown. In 1996, following a campaign by historian Lewis Sorley, Cohen finally received the Distinguished Service Cross—the second highest decoration in the Army.

== Later life and legacy ==
Cohen mustered out of the Army in 1945 after Nazi Germany's surrender. He returned to civilian life in South Carolina and joined his brothers in the family business, Cohen's Department Stores (prior to World War II, he had helped run the family's textile manufacturing concern). In 1950, he moved to Tifton, Georgia, and married Bettye Pincus. In the mid-1960s, he founded his own outdoor advertising company, Tri-State Systems. In 1989, he sold the business and retired. Bettye died in November 2005, and Harold died in Tifton on August 15, 2006, at age 89. Two children and four grandchildren survived them.

Even though Cohen kept a low profile throughout his civilian life, Tifton named the Harold Cohen Boulevard and the Harold Cohen Highway in his honor. In 2009, the small Belgian town of Chaumont named a road leading through the village to Bastogne the "Rue Du Col. Harold Cohen" in Cohen's honor.

In 2022, the Naming Commission placed Cohen on its shortlist of potential new names for nine Army installations named in honor of the Confederacy.
