= Camp Harry J. Jones =

Military camp in Douglas, Arizona

- Near Douglas, Arizona in United States
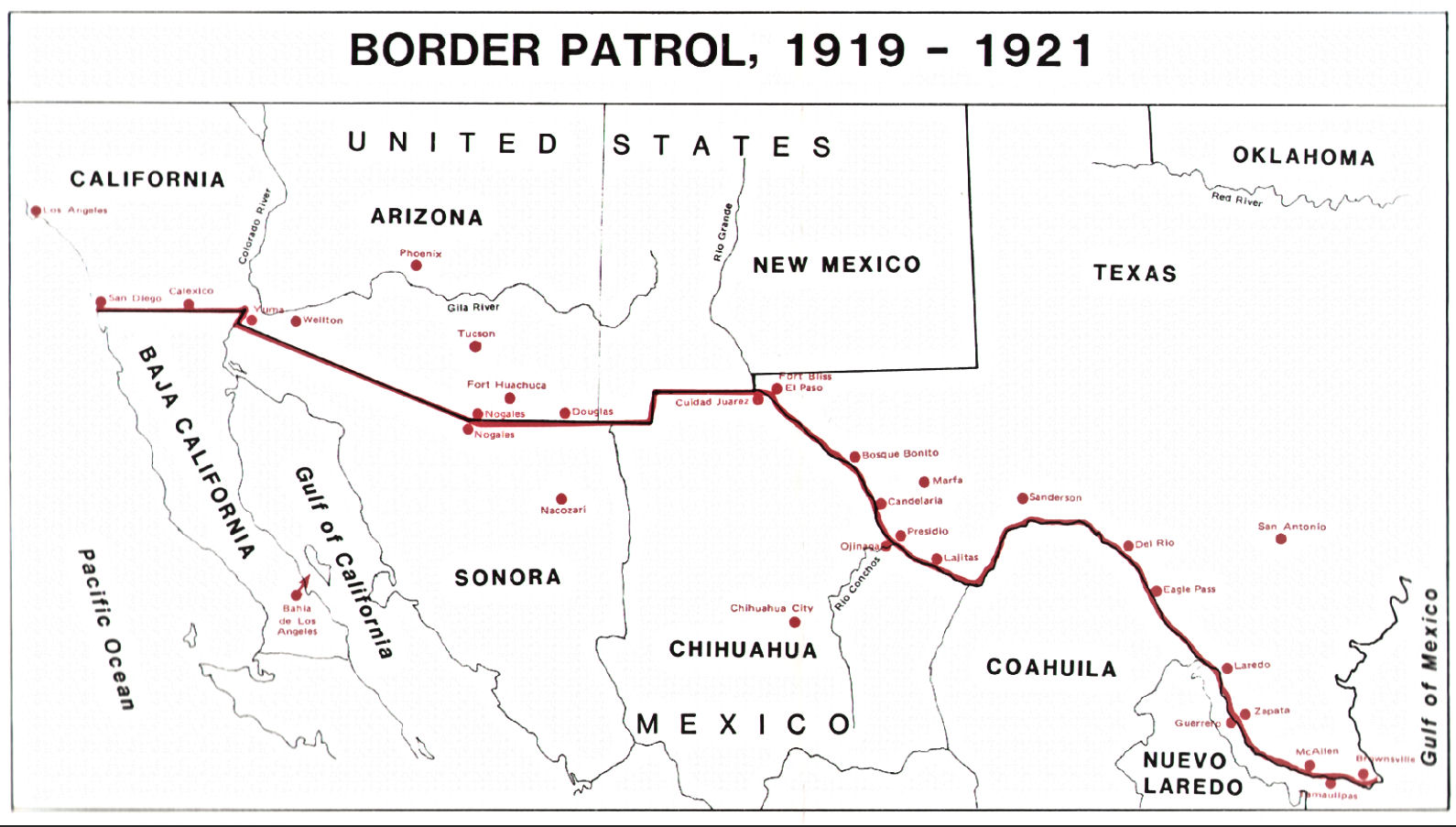
- Map showing location of the U.S. Army southwestern border outposts, including Douglas, Arizona, the site of Camp Harry J. Jones. The main entrance was near what is today the intersection of West 10th Street and North Washington Avenue

Site information
- Condition: Residential area within Douglas, Arizona city limits

Location
- Coordinates: 31°20′40.1″N 109°31′41.7″W

Site history
- Fate: Closed
- Battles/wars: Pancho Villa Expedition; World War I

Camp Harry J. Jones was an encampment of the United States Army. Located near Douglas, Arizona, it was active during the Pancho Villa Expedition and World War I.

== History ==
The United States Army established a camp near Douglas, Arizona in 1910, one of a number of camps established along the border with Mexico to provide border security during the conflicts that were part of the Mexican Revolution. The site was renamed Camp Harry J. Jones in 1916, in honor of a soldier who had been accidentally shot and killed by a stray bullet while on guard duty during the Second Battle of Agua Prieta, which took place between revolutionaries and Mexican government forces across the border from Douglas.

Camp Harry J. Jones was an important facility during the 1916–17 Expedition against Pancho Villa, which was commanded by John J. Pershing, with several cavalry units stationed there to provide security against incursions by Villa's forces. The camp also served as the mobilization site for the Arizona National Guard when it was called up to take part in the Villa Expedition.

During the Villa expedition, units based at Camp Harry J. Jones made extensive use of automobiles and trucks, and also employed aircraft for observation and scouting. This use of motorized vehicles was the Army's first major effort to employ mechanized forces, and foreshadowed its transition away from horses and mules.

== World War I ==
Camp Harry J. Jones remained an important location during World War I, and was the headquarters of the Army's Arizona District. Soldiers stationed there continued to patrol the U.S. border with Mexico to deter possible attacks by German soldiers or infiltration by German spies.

== Closure ==
Camp Harry J. Jones was closed in January 1933. Several southwestern border posts were proposed for closure as a cost savings measure during the Great Depression. Local leaders in Douglas and state leaders in Arizona attempted to prevent the closure, but were unsuccessful. Many of the troops then stationed at Camp Harry J. Jones were transferred to nearby Fort Huachuca. Soldiers of the 10th Cavalry Regiment salvaged buildings and other equipment, much of which was sold or moved to Fort Huachuca. There are no existing traces of Camp Harry J. Jones, and the location of the camp is now a residential area within the Douglas city limits.

== Location ==
The camp entrance was described in a contemporary account as being at the east end of 10th Street in Douglas. An existing map shows the camp as bounded on the west by North Washington Avenue, on the north by East 13th Street, and on the south by 1st Street. This area corresponds roughly to the area between Calvary Cemetery in Douglas and the Douglas Municipal Airport.

== Notable people ==
- Upton Birnie Jr., commander of 1st Battalion, 6th Artillery Regiment at start of World War I
- DeRosey Caroll Cabell, commander of the Arizona District during World War I
- Holmes E. Dager, served with 1st New Jersey Infantry Regiment in 1916
- James M. Gavin, assigned to the 25th Infantry Regiment at Camp Harry J. Jones from 1929 to 1932
- William H. Hay, commander of the 1st Cavalry Brigade at Camp Harry J. Jones from 1922 to 1924
- Charles S. Kilburn, served as a second lieutenant at Camp Harry J. Jones during the beginning of his career
- John F. Madden, commander of the 19th Infantry Regiment from 1919 to 1920
- Edward McGlachlin Jr., commander of the Arizona District during World War I
- Perry L. Miles, served with 14th Infantry Regiment during Pancho Villa Expedition
- Troy H. Middleton, served with the 7th Infantry Regiment during the Second Battle of Agua Prieta
- George H. Morgan, Medal of Honor recipient, commanded Camp Harry J. Jones and the Douglas sub-district of the Arizona District during World War I
- Francis L. Parker, commander of the 1st Cavalry Regiment from September 1920 to January 1921
- Guy H. Preston, commanded Camp Harry Jones and the 1st Infantry Regiment from August 1919 to September 1920
- Donald A. Stroh, stationed at Camp Harry J. Jones as a member of the 17th Cavalry Regiment during World War I
- Lucian Truscott, stationed at Camp Harry J. Jones as a member of the 17th Cavalry Regiment during World War I
- Leroy H. Watson, stationed at Camp Harry J. Jones with the 22nd Infantry during the Pancho Villa Expedition
- John E. Woodward, stationed at Camp Harry J. Jones as adjutant of the Arizona District from 1916 to 1917

== Sources ==
=== Newspapers ===
- "More Officers Resign From First New Jersey Regiment". The Evening Record. Hackensack, NJ. August 10, 1916 – via Newspapers.com.
- "Gen. Hay Does to Sam Houston". El Paso Herald. El Paso, TX. November 12, 1919 – via Newspapers.com.
- "Southwest News: W. H. Hay". Holbrook News. Holbrook, AZ. December 1, 1922 – via Newspapers.com.
- "Hurley Defends Moving Troops". Arizona Daily Star. Tucson, AZ. Associated Press. December 31, 1932 – via Newspapers.com.
- Mott, Harvey L. (April 17, 1934). "Fort Huachuca is Steeped in Historic Lore". Arizona Republic. Phoenix, AZ – via Newspapers.com.
- Arizona Capitol Times Staff (March 31, 2014). "Border Duty, 1916". Arizona Capitol Times. Phoenix, AZ.
- Naylor, Roger (August 13, 2015). "Arizona's Military History: Pancho Villa". Arizona Republic. Phoenix, AZ.

=== Books ===
- Brandes, Ray (1960). Frontier Military Posts of Arizona. Globe, AZ: Dale Stuart King.
- Cullum, George W. (1910). Braden, Charles (ed.). Biographical Register of the Officers and Graduates of the U.S. Military Academy at West Point. Vol. Supplement, Volume V. Saginaw, MI: Seemann & Peters – via Google Books.
- Cullum, George W. (1920). Robinson, Wirt (ed.). Biographical Register of the Officers and Graduates of the U.S. Military Academy. Vol. VI–A. Saginaw, MI: Seemann & Peters – via Google Books.
- Cullum, George W. (1930). Donaldson, Wm. H. (ed.). Biographical Register of the Officers and Graduates of the U.S. Military Academy. Vol. VII. Chicago, Illinois and Crawfordsville, Indiana: R. R. Donnelley & Sons, The Lakeside Press – via Google Books.
- Ferguson, Harvey (2015-03-16). The Last Cavalryman: The Life of General Lucian K. Truscott, Jr. Norman, OK: University of Oklahoma Press. ISBN 978-0-8061-4664-5.
- Hayostek, Cindy (2009). Images of America: Douglas. Charleston, SC: Arcadia Publishing. ISBN 978-0-7385-7065-5.
- Heard, Ralph T. (1919). A History of the Sixth Regiment, Field Artillery, First Division, United States Army. Koblenz: Görres-Druckerei – via Google Books.
- Muir, Malcolm (2001). The Human Tradition in the World War II Era. Wilmington, DE: Scholarly Resources, Inc. ISBN 978-0-8420-2785-4.
- Price, Frank James (1974). Troy H. Middleton: A Biography. Baton Rouge, LA: Louisiana State University Press. ISBN 978-0-8071-2467-3.
- Robinson, Wirt (1920). Supplement, Biographical Register of the Officers and Graduates of the U.S. Military Academy. Vol. VI–B. Saginaw, MI: Seeman & Peters. pp. 1798–1799 – via United States Military Academy Library.
- Stofft, William A. (Chief of Military History) (1988). Order of Battle of the United States Land Forces in the World War (PDF). Washington, DC: Center of Military History, United States Army. Archived from the original (PDF) on March 4, 2016.
- Van Ells, Mark D. (2015). America and World War I: A Traveler's Guide. Northampton, MA: Interlink Books. ISBN 978-1-56656-975-0.
- Wilson, John Philip (1995). Islands in the Desert: A History of the Uplands of Southeastern Arizona. Albuquerque, NM: University of New Mexico Press. ISBN 978-0-8263-1615-8.

=== Magazines ===
- Francaviglia, Richard V. (Spring 1986). "Streetcars to the Smelters: An Historical Overview of the Douglas Street Railways, 1901–1914" (PDF). Cochise Quarterly. Douglas, AZ: Cochise County Historical and Archaeological Society.
- Krisman, Michael J., ed. (December 1980). "Death Notice, Charles S. Kilburn". Assembly. West Point, NY: Association of Graduates, USMA – via Google Books.

=== Internet ===
- Lucas, Robert (January 13, 2010). "Douglas: "The Smelter City" Cleaned Up To Become "The Premier Southwestern Border Community"". arizona100.
- Stumpf, Robert E. (2018). "Biography, Donald A. Stroh". 9th Infantry Division In WW2. Copenhagen, Denmark: Yuri Beckers.
