= 35th Armor Regiment =

35th Armored Regiment
- Coat of Arms
- Active: 1941
- Country: USA
- Branch: Armor Branch (United States)
- Type: Armor
- Motto: VINCERE VEL MORI (Conquer Or Die)
- Branch color: Yellow

Insignia
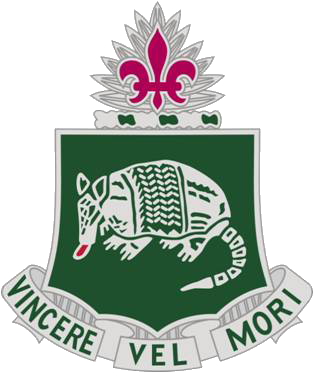
- Distinctive Unit Insignia

The 35th Armored Regiment is a regiment of the United States Army first established in 1941. The lineage of the regiment is carried on by the 1st Battalion 35th Armored Regiment, currently attached to the 2nd Brigade Combat Team, 1st Armored Division.

== Distinctive unit insignia ==
- Description

A Silver color and metal enamel device 1 1/8 inches (2.9 cm) in height overall blazoned as follows: Vert, an armadillo passant Argent, langued Gules. Attached above from a wreath Argent and Vert, a fleur-de-lis Gules in front of palm branch of the first. Attached below a tripartite Silver scroll inscribed "VINCERE" "VEL" "MORI" in Green letters.

- Symbolism

The shield is green, the color of the Armored Force. The armadillo, being characterized by the qualities of invulnerability, ferociousness, protection, and cunning endurance, alludes to the elements which are vital if the organization is to pursue successfully its duties. The palm is for military victory. The fleur-de-lis commemorates World War II service in France. The color red symbolizes courage. The motto translates to "To Conquer or Die".

- Background

The distinctive unit insignia was originally approved for the 35th Armored Regiment on 1 June 1942. It was redesignated for the 35th Tank Battalion on 12 November 1943. The insignia was redesignated for the 35th Constabulary Squadron on 29 November 1946. It was redesignated for the 35th Tank Battalion and amended by the addition of a crest on 20 August 1956. It was amended to change the description on 14 March 1957. The insignia was redesignated for the 35th Armor Regiment on 22 September 1958.

== Coat of arms ==
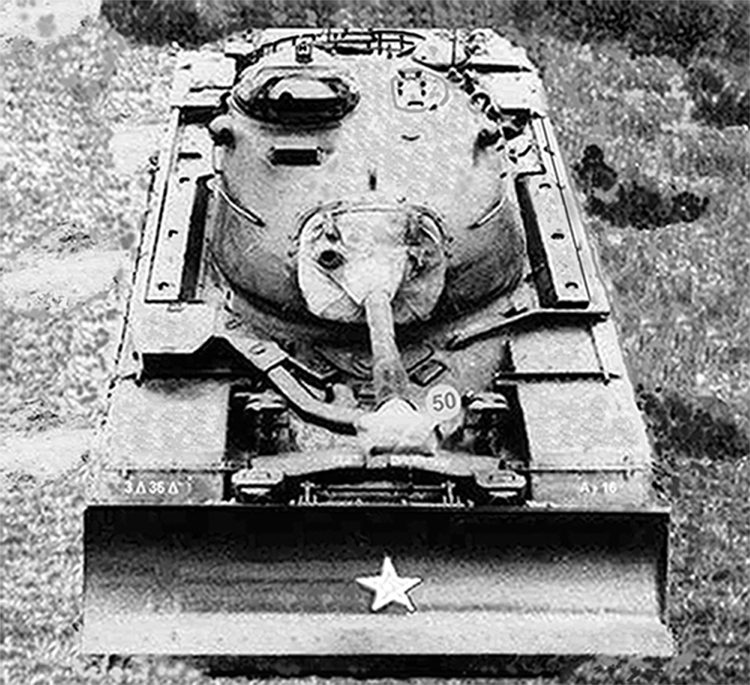
Tank M48 A2 with dozer blade (Vehicle of Company Alpha, 35th Armor), 1972 or 1973

=== Blazon ===
- Shield

Vert, an armadillo passant Argent, langued Gules.

- Crest

From a wreath Argent and Vert, a fleur-de-lis Gules in front of a palm branch of the first. Motto VINCERE VEL MORI (To Conquer Or Die).

  - Symbolism
- Shield

The shield is green, the color of the Armored Force. The armadillo, being characterized by the qualities of invulnerability, ferociousness, protection, and cunning endurance, alludes to the elements which are vital if the organization is to pursue successfully its duties.

- Crest

The palm is for military victory. The fleur-de-lis commemorates World War II service in France.

- Background

The coat of arms was originally approved for the 35th Armored Regiment on 30 May 1942. It was redesignated for the 35th Tank Battalion on 12 November 1943. The insignia was redesignated for the 35th Constabulary Squadron on 26 November 1946. It was redesignated for the 35th Tank Battalion and amended by the addition of a crest on 20 August 1956. It was amended to change the blazon on 14 March 1957. The insignia was redesignated for the 35th Armor Regiment on 22 September 1958.

== Current configuration ==
- 1st Battalion, 35th Armored Regiment

== See also ==
- List of armored and cavalry regiments of the United States Army
