= John Shirley Wood =

US Army general (1888–1966)

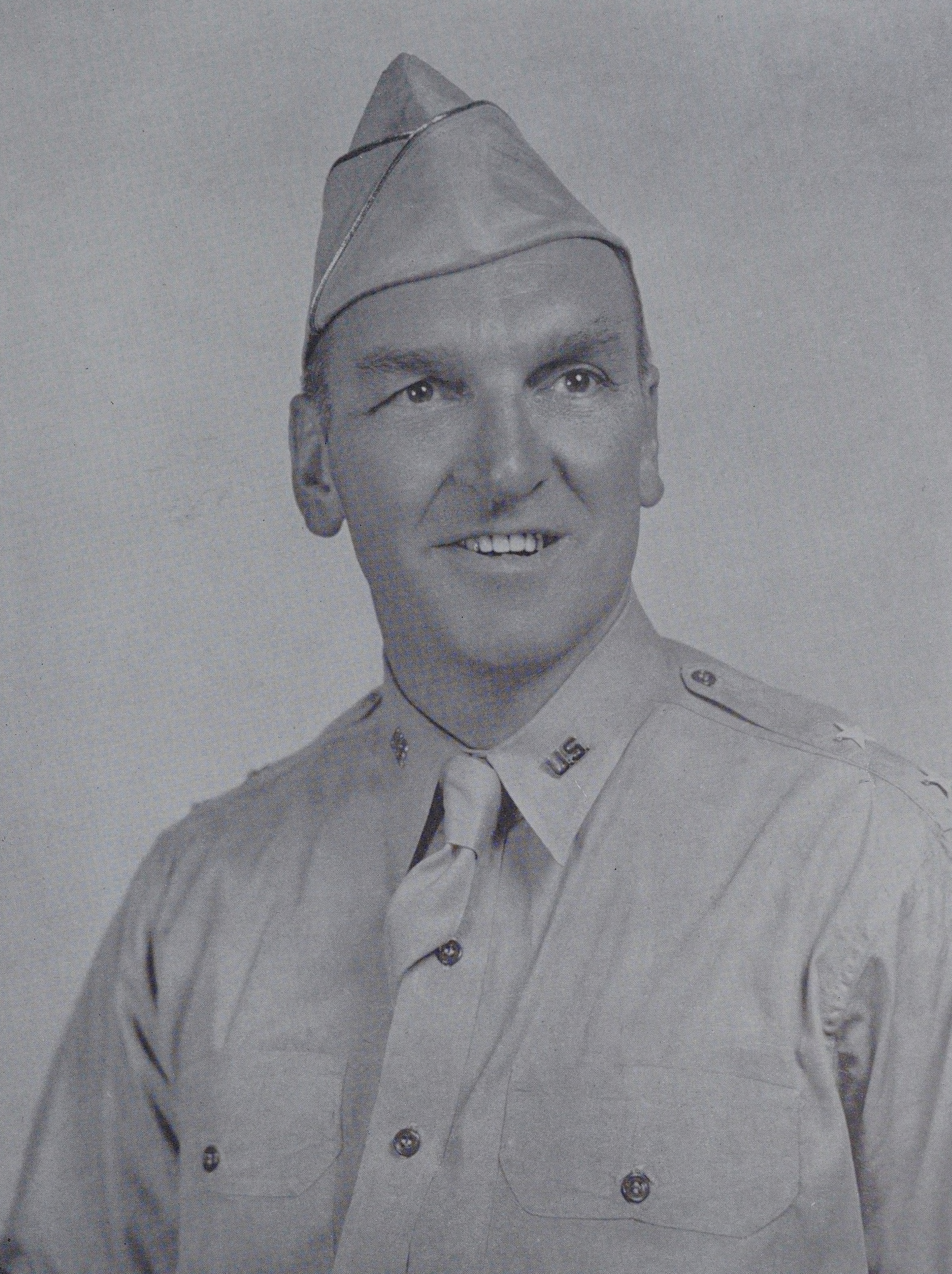
- Wood as 4th Armored Division commander c. 1942
- Born: January 11, 1888; Monticello, Arkansas, United States
- Died: July 2, 1966 (aged 78); Reno, Nevada, United States
- Burial place: West Point Cemetery, New York, United States
- Military career
- Allegiance: United States
- Branch: United States Army
- Service years: 1912–1946
- Rank: Major General
- Nicknames: "P" "Tiger Jack"
- Service number: 0-3352
- Units: Coast Artillery Corps; United States Army Ordnance Corps; Field Artillery Branch
- Commands: 2nd Battalion, 16th Field Artillery Regiment; 3rd Battalion, 80th Field Artillery Regiment; 4th Armored Division; Tank Training Center, Fort Knox, Kentucky
- Conflicts: World War I World War II
- Awards: Distinguished Service Cross; Army Distinguished Service Medal; Silver Star; Air Medal (2); Bronze Star (2)

Major General John Shirley Wood (January 11, 1888 – July 2, 1966) was a United States Army officer who served in World War I and World War II. He is most notable for training and commanding the 4th Armored Division, which spearheaded General George S. Patton's Third Army drive across France in 1944 during World War II.

== Early life ==
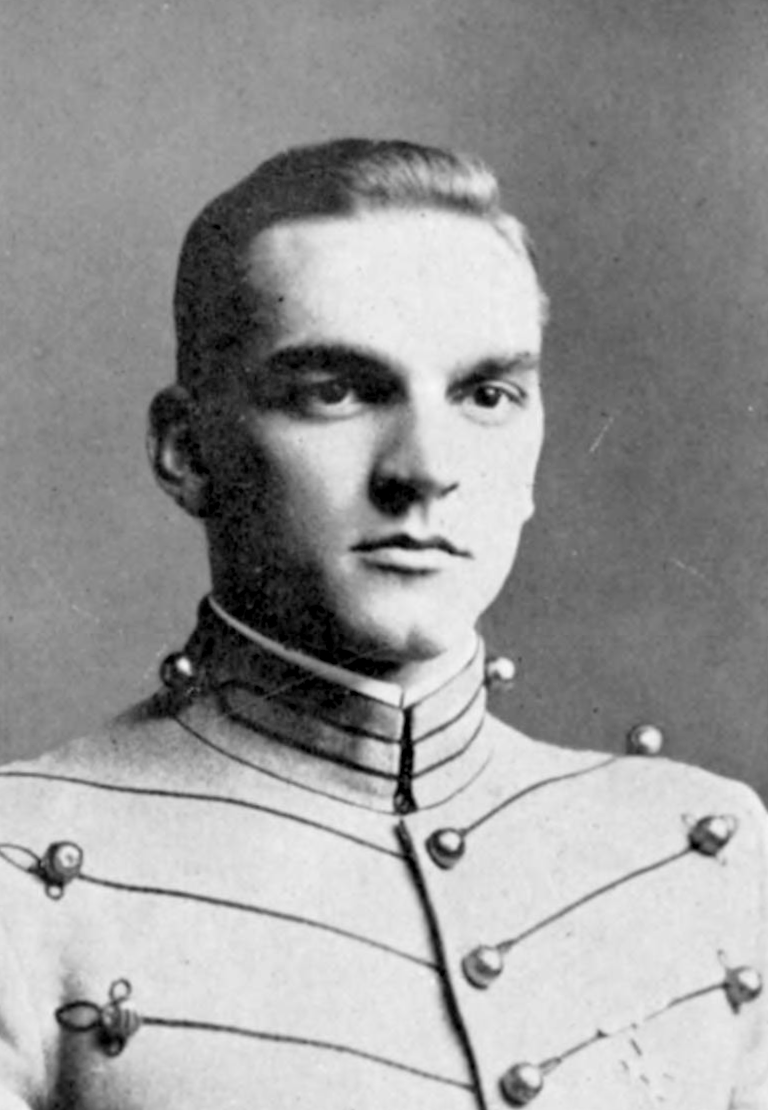
At West Point in 1912

John Shirley Wood was born in Monticello, Arkansas, on January 11, 1888, and was the son of Arkansas Supreme Court Justice Carroll D. Wood and Reola (Thompson) Wood. John Wood graduated from the University of Arkansas in three years, in 1907, was a member of the Kappa Alpha Order and was quarterback and captain of the football team. In 1908, he began attendance at the United States Military Academy (USMA) at West Point, New York; he graduated in 1912, and lettered in football, wrestling and boxing.

Wood had taught chemistry while at the University of Arkansas, and at West Point he received his first nickname, "P" for "professor" because he used his skills as an instructor to tutor many academically deficient classmates.

== Military career ==
Wood was commissioned as a second lieutenant in the Coast Artillery on June 12, 1912. He made an early mark in military academics, including assistant football coach and chemistry instructor at West Point. Wood wrote on military topics, and his articles and reviews and digests of military literature from other countries, including France, Germany, Italy and Spain appeared in professional journals throughout his career. In August 1916, after having been promoted to first lieutenant the month before, he returned to the United States Military Academy faculty and transferred to the Ordnance Corps in September. He was promoted to captain on May 15, 1917, a few weeks after the American entry into World War I, and to the temporary rank of major on December 18.

=== World War I ===
In March 1918, he sailed for France with the 3rd Division and participated in military operations at Chateau Thierry from May to June.

He served on the staffs of the 3rd Division and 90th Division and took part in the Battle of Château-Thierry and Battle of Saint-Mihiel.

Wood then attended the French Staff School at Langres, from which he graduated in September. The school was created to teach planning and management skills to officers, and his classmates included George S. Patton, William Hood Simpson, and Alexander Patch. He returned to the United States in October 1918 and was assigned as Personnel Officer of the 18th Division at Camp Travis, Texas, before the war ended due to the Armistice with Germany the following month.

=== Post-World War I ===
In February 1919, he was transferred to the Field Artillery and became Professor of Military Science and Tactics at the University of Wisconsin.

In 1921, he was assigned as executive officer of the 11th Field Artillery Regiment in Hawaii. He was a distinguished graduate of his class at the United States Army Command and General Staff College in June 1924. (Patton was the Honor Graduate.) From June 1924 to May 1927, he was Executive Officer of the Motorized Artillery Brigade at Schofield Barracks, Hawaii. From May 1927 to July 1929, he commanded the 2nd Battalion, 16th Field Artillery Regiment at Fort Bragg, North Carolina. In July 1929, he began the course at France's Écoles Supérieures de Guerre, from which he graduated in August 1931.

From August 1931 to 1932, he was Assistant to the Commandant of Cadets at West Point. From 1932 to August 1937, Wood was Professor of Military Science and Tactics at Culver Military Academy. On August 1, 1937, he was promoted to lieutenant colonel and was commander of 3rd Battalion, 80th Field Artillery Regiment from August 1937 to September 1939. From September 1939 to 1940, Wood served as Chief of Staff for General Stanley D. Embick, Commanding General of Third Army.

On 1 November 1940, he was promoted to colonel and assigned as Commanding Officer, 1st Infantry Division Artillery. In April 1941, he took command of the artillery of the 2nd Armored Division, but only served until June. From June to October 1941, he was Chief of Staff of the 1st Armored Corps. On November 5, 1941 (October 31), he was promoted to the temporary rank of brigadier general and took command of Combat Command "A", 5th Armored Division.

=== World War II ===
In May 1942, five months after the American entry into World War II, Wood took command of the 4th Armored Division (activated April 15, 1941) after Major General Henry W. Baird, and was responsible for the 4th Armored's organization and training. On June 21 he was promoted to the temporary rank of major general.

==== Operations in Brittany ====
Remaining in command of his division for the next two years, Wood spent that time training the 4th Armored for eventual overseas service. On July 28, 1944, Wood led the 4th Armored into combat in France after the Normandy breakout as part of Operation Cobra and was awarded the Distinguished Service Cross (DSC).

The Operation Overlord plan called for the U.S. Third Army, commanded by Lieutenant General George S. Patton, to liberate Brittany, in particular the ports of Brest and Lorient and the Quiberon peninsula, enabling the implementation of Operation Chastity, the creation of a new port in Quiberon Bay to support the advance of 12th Army Group.

By 3 August, Wood's 4th Armored Division had reached the base of the Quiberon peninsula. Disorganized German forces were retreating into Lorient, St. Nazaire and up the Quiberon peninsula.

At this point, Wood proposed blocking the base of the Brittany peninsula and moving the majority of his forces eastward towards Chartres. Major General Troy H. Middleton, commanding VIII Corps, ordered the division to hold a line along the Vilaine River, sealing off the Rennes to Quiberon region. The 4th Armored Division stopped roughly ten miles short of the Quiberon Bay objective, despite facing minimal opposition.

Believing that operations in Brittany had no strategic value, Wood told more than one colleague that his superiors were winning the war, but doing it "the wrong way." However, Lieutenant Colonel Harold L. Mack, of the COMZ staff, who described the failure to implement Operation Chastity as the "Critical Error of World War II". placed the blame for failing to capture Quiberon Bay on Wood stating that he "had set his heart on participating in the main drive for Paris, where he could achieve fame and glory" and accuses Wood and all his superiors in the chain of command of failing to appreciate the "supreme need of taking Quiberon Bay".

==== Drive across France ====
The 4th Armored led the Third Army's drive east across France, earning Wood his second nickname, "Tiger Jack" because when Patton would yell at him, Wood would pace like a caged animal and argue back.

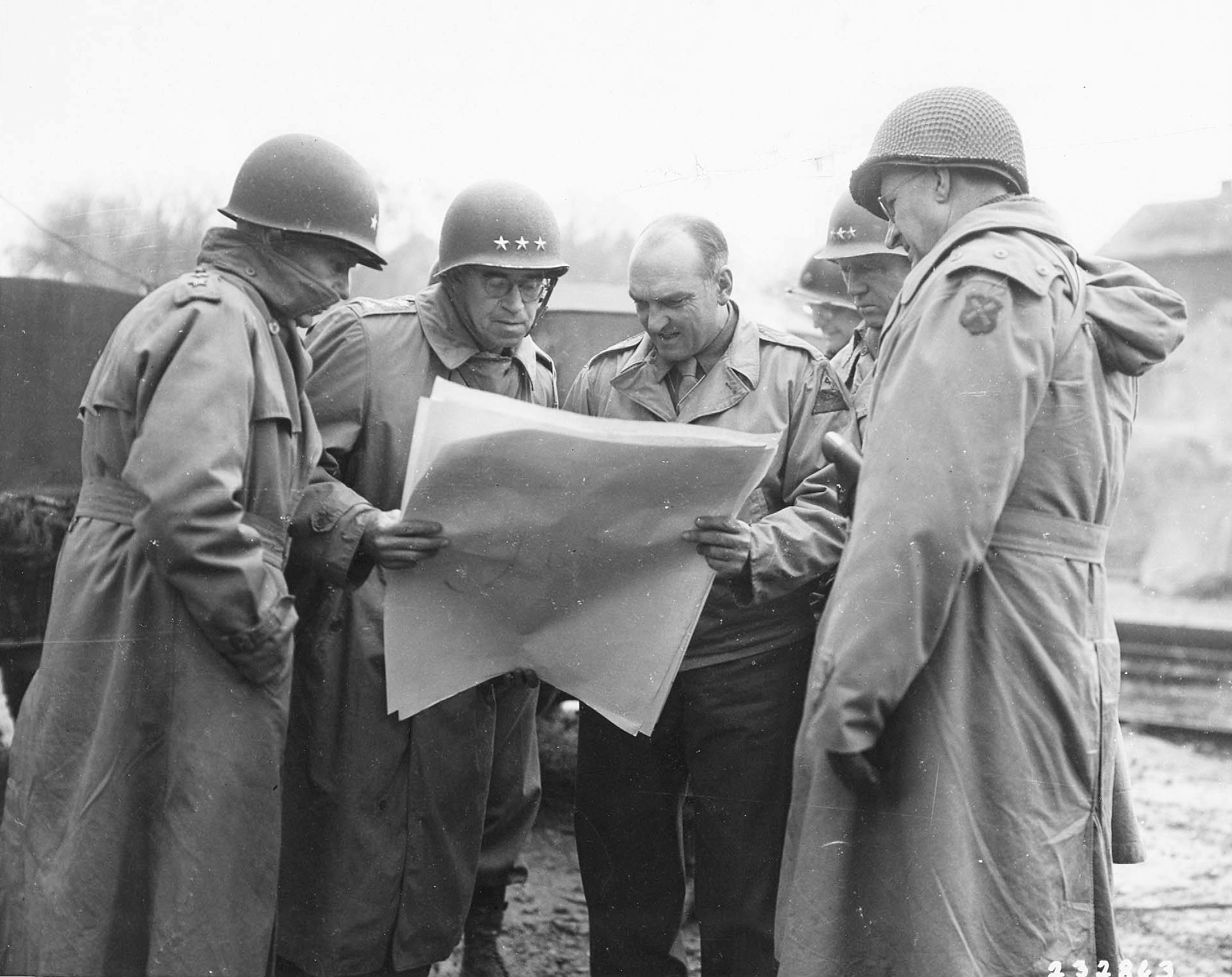
From left to right: unknown officer, Lieutenant General Omar Bradley, Major General John S. Wood, Lieutenant General George S. Patton, and Major General Manton S. Eddy being shown a map by one of Patton's armored battalion commanders during a tour near Metz, France, November 1944

In August 1944, Wood ran into difficulty when command of his higher headquarters within Third Army, the XII Corps, was assigned to Manton S. Eddy. Wood thought he had earned the opportunity to command a corps, but was bypassed by Omar Bradley, the commander of the U.S. 12th Army Group, which included Patton's Third Army. Wood was an artilleryman, and may have been passed over in favor of Eddy, who was an infantryman, as was Bradley. It is also possible that Wood was not selected for corps command because of his outspoken manner and willingness to question his superiors.

==== End of active duty ====
Wood did not get along with Eddy, including refusing to provide Eddy's headquarters with routine reports or copies of 4th Armored Division's operations orders. Eddy eventually complained to Patton, and Patton replaced Wood with Major General Hugh Gaffey on 3 December 1944, shortly before the Battle of the Bulge.

At the time of Wood's relief, he was assured by his superiors, the Third Army commander, Patton, and Dwight D. Eisenhower, the Supreme Allied Commander on the Western Front, that he was being relieved only because medical reports indicated that he was ill, and that after a short rest he would either return to command of the 4th Armored Division or be promoted to command of a corps. Wood received the Distinguished Service Cross, Distinguished Service Medal and the Silver Star for his service as commander of the 4th Armored Division.

Wood returned to duty in the United States, and finished his military career in 1946 as the commander of the Armor Replacement Training Center (ARTC) at Fort Knox, Kentucky.

== Post-military career ==
After retiring from the Army, Wood worked for the United Nations as Chief of Mission for the International Refugee Organization in Austria (1947-1952), and Chief of Mission for the United Nations Reconstruction Administration in Tokyo, South Korea, and Geneva (1952-1953).

From 1957 to 1958 he was Civil Defense Director for Washoe County, Nevada.

== Retirement, death and burial ==
In retirement Wood resided in Reno, Nevada. He died there on July 2, 1966, and was buried at West Point Cemetery.

== Personality ==
Wood was known for leading from the front, often flying in a light observation plane that would land him near his lead elements so he could observe and provide direction; the pilot of his L-4 liaison aircraft was the legendary airman Major Charles M. Carpenter - known to the press as 'Bazooka Charlie' - with whom Wood formed a close and very loyal relationship. Wood was also known for setting an example by sharing the field-service conditions experienced by the ordinary soldiers, which included living in a tent: during the operations in France, he criticised Courtney Hodges, commander of First United States Army, for living and working in specially built panel-vans, instead of sharing the privations of the men and using a tent like them. In addition, he was known for his eccentricities and outspokenness: as a Command and General Staff College student he displayed his disdain for an instructor by reading a newspaper during a lecture; in 1942, during training maneuvers in Tennessee, Wood argued publicly with exercise coordinator Ben Lear after Lear made disparaging remarks about the 4th Armored Division during an after action review.

== Family ==
Wood was married to Marguerite Little (1890-1984). Their children included sons Lieutenant Colonel Carroll D. Wood (1913-1955) (West Point, 1937), Colonel John S. Wood (1920-2004) (West Point, 1943), and a daughter, Shirley (born 1929).

On May 17, 1957, Wood married Abigail Holman Harvey (1899-1983), who survived him.

== Recognition ==
In addition to his military awards, Wood received an honorary LL.D. from the University of Arkansas in 1946.

His papers are part of the collections at the Syracuse University Library.

He was the subject of a biography, 1979's Tiger Jack by Hanson W. Baldwin.

== Reputation ==
Wood is widely regarded as one of the best division commanders of World War II. Basil H. Liddell Hart wrote of Wood that "John S. Wood [was] one of the most dynamic commanders of Armor in World War II, and the first in the allied armies to demonstrate in Europe the essence of the art and tempo of handling a mobile force."

Lieutenant General Willis D. Crittenberger said of Wood "He far exceeded in his leadership capabilities any man I have ever known." General Bruce C. Clarke, who served under Wood in the 4th Armored Division as Chief of Staff and commander of Combat Command A, said years later "The 'Gods of War' did not smile on 'P' Wood... . Under different circumstances 'P' had the brains, the knowledge, the drive, the magnetic hold on his men to have been listed on the rolls of the 'Great Captains' of history."

== Military awards ==
Wood's military decorations and awards include:

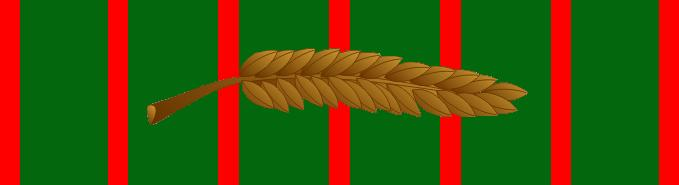

1st Row	Distinguished Service Cross		Army Distinguished Service Medal	
2nd Row	Silver Star	Bronze Star Medal with Oak Leaf Cluster	Army Commendation	Air Medal with Oak Leaf Cluster
3rd Row	World War I Victory Medal with three battle clasps	American Defense Service Medal	American Campaign Medal	European–African–Middle Eastern Campaign Medal with three 3/16 inch service stars
4th Row	World War II Victory Medal	Legion of Honour, Officer	French Croix de guerre 1914–1918 with Palm	French Croix de guerre 1939–1945 with Palm

== Sources ==
- Baldwin, Hanson W. (1979). Tiger Jack. Old Army Press. ISBN 978-0883420591.
- Denny, Norman R. (2003). Seduction in Combat: Losing Sight of logistics after D-Day (PDF) (MSc.). Faculty of the U.S. Army Command and General Staff College. Archived (PDF) from the original on October 8, 2021.
- Mack, Harold L. (1981). The Critical Error of World War II. National Security Affairs Issue Papers. Washington, DC: National Defence University. hdl:2027/mdp.39015055835725. OCLC 605367568. 81-1.

Military offices
Preceded by Henry W. Baird	Commanding General 4th Armored Division; 1942–1944	Succeeded by Hugh Joseph Gaffey
