= 51st Infantry Regiment (United States) =

- Coat of arms
- Active: 1917–present
- Country: United States
- Branch: United States Army
- Type: Infantry
- Motto: "I Serve"
- Branch color: Light Blue

Insignia
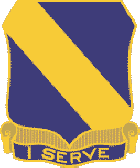
- Distinctive unit insignia

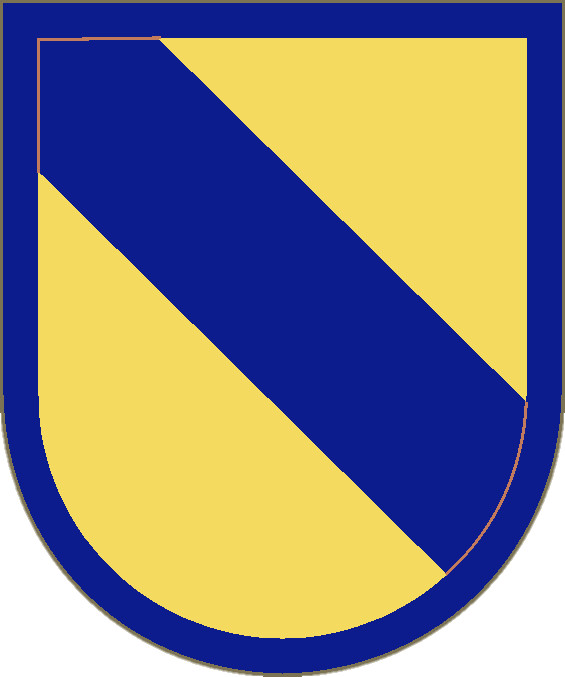
- Beret flash

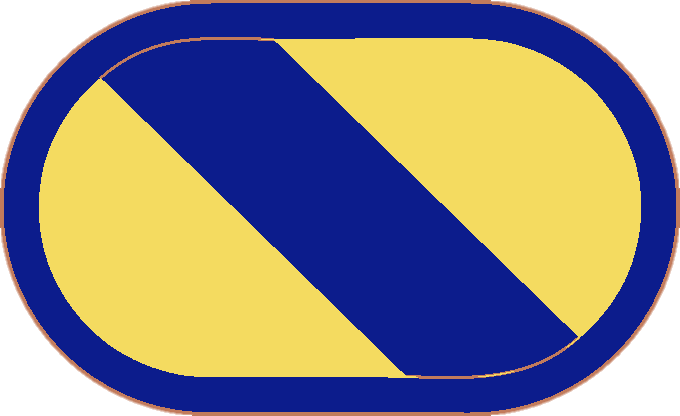
- Airborne background trimming

The 51st Infantry Regiment is a regiment of the United States Army first established in 1917.

== History ==
=== World War I ===
The 51st Infantry Regiment was constituted 15 May 1917 at Chickamauga Park, Georgia, and assigned on 16 November 1917 to the 6th Division.

=== Interwar period ===
The 51st Infantry arrived at the port of New York on 12 June 1919 on the troopship USS Leviathan and was transferred to Camp Merritt, New Jersey, where emergency period personnel were discharged from the service. It was transferred on 19 June 1919 to Camp Grant, Illinois, where it was inactivated on 22 September 1921 and allotted to the Sixth Corps Area; the 53rd Infantry Regiment was previously designated as "Active Associate" on 27 July 1921, and would provide the personnel to reactivate the 51st Infantry in the event of war. The personnel of the 51st Infantry were concurrently transferred to the 53rd Infantry. The 53rd Infantry was relieved as Active Associate on 17 July 1922 and the 2nd Infantry Regiment was designated as Active Associate.

The 51st Infantry was organized on 9 May 1926 with Organized Reserve personnel as a "Regular Army Inactive" (RAI) unit with headquarters at Madison, Wisconsin. It was relieved from the 6th Division on 15 August 1927 and assigned to the 9th Division; concurrently, the 2nd Infantry was relieved as Active Associate. The 51st Infantry, less the 2nd and 3rd Battalions, was then affiliated with the Reserve Officers' Training Corps (ROTC) program at the University of Wisconsin, in Madison, Wisconsin, and was organized on 15 April 1929 as an RAI unit with Regular Army personnel assigned to the ROTC detachment and Reserve officers commissioned from the program. Concurrently, the 2nd Battalion was affiliated with Michigan State College ROTC, in Lansing, Michigan, and the 3rd Battalion was affiliated with the University of Michigan ROTC, in Ann Arbor, Michigan. The 51st Infantry conducted its annual summer training at Fort Sheridan, Illinois, and also conducted infantry Citizens Military Training Camps some years at Fort Sheridan as an alternate form of summer training. The designated mobilization training station for the regiment was Fort Sheridan.

The regiment was attached to the 101st Division for administrative purposes on 3 November 1930. It was relieved from the 9th Division on 1 October 1933 and reassigned to the 6th Division. It was relieved 16 October 1939 from the 6th Division. It was redesignated the 51st Infantry Regiment (Armored) on 15 April 1941, assigned to the new 4th Armored Division, and activated, less Reserve personnel, at Pine Camp, New York.

=== World War II ===
The regiment was redesignated on 1 January 1942 as the 51st Armored Infantry Regiment. In 1943, most U.S. armored divisions adopted a new "light" structure that included, among other changes, the use of three separate armored infantry battalions rather than a single armored infantry regiment. On 10 September 1943, the 51st Armored Infantry Regiment was broken up and redesignated, less the 1st and 2nd Battalions, as the 51st Armored Infantry Battalion, while the 1st and 2nd Battalions were redesignated as the 53rd and 10th Armored Infantry Battalions, respectively.

=== Postwar ===
On 1 May 1946, the 10th, 51st, and 53rd Armored Infantry Battalions were redesignated the 10th, 51st, and 53rd Constabulary Squadrons.

=== Company F ===
Following World War II, Company C, 10th Armored Infantry Battalion was reorganized and redesignated on 1 May 1946 as Company C, 10th Constabulary Squadron, an element of the 14th Constabulary Regiment, United States Constabulary in Germany. It was inactivated on 20 December 1948 in Germany and concurrently converted and redesignated as Company C, 10th Armored Infantry Battalion, an element of the 4th Armored Division, then redesignated 25 February 1953 as Company C, 510th Armored Infantry Battalion, an element of the 4th Armored Division. The company was activated on 15 June 1954 at Fort Hood, Texas and inactivated there on 1 April 1957, Texas. Concurrently, the 510th Armored Infantry Battalion was relieved from assignment to the 4th Armored Division with the reorganization of Army combat forces into the Pentomic concept.

Company F was redesignated on 1 July 1959 as Headquarters and Headquarters Company, 6th Battle Group, 51st Infantry but remained inactive. It was redesignated again on 11 August 1967, this time as Company F, 51st Infantry and activated on 25 September 1967 in Vietnam with the reflagging of the 196th Long Range Reconnaissance Patrol Detachment, Americal Division, The lineage of F-51st was inactivated on 26 December 1968 in Vietnam when the unit was reflagged as Company G, 75th Infantry (separate lineage and honors).

Company F was reactivated 16 December 1986 as VII Corps' Long Range Surveillance Company (LRS) in Ludwigsburg Germany at Coffey barracks attached to 511th MI, serving there until 15 November 1991, when it was inactivated. It was reactivated on 16 April 1995 as the LRS company of the 525th Military Intelligence Brigade (Airborne), Fort Bragg, North Carolina, then redesignated on 1 October 2005 as Company F, 51st Infantry Regiment. The colors were inactivated on 15 March 2009 at Fort Bragg when the company was reflagged as Troop C (LRS), 1st Squadron, 38th Cavalry Regiment, 525th Battlefield Surveillance Brigade. With this reorganization of the 525th, Troop C became the only Airborne unit in the brigade.

On 16 January 2011, the company was assigned to the 1st Brigade Combat Team, 1st Armored Division, and activated at Fort Bliss. It was inactivated on 15 November 2013 and relieved from assignment to the brigade. The company was again activated on 16 November 2014 at Fort Bragg.

=== Company E ===
Company E, 51st Infantry was active in Germany from 1986 as V Corps' Long Range Surveillance company, attached to the 165th MI BN (TE). It was formed at Wiesbaden Air Base; Wiesbaden, Germany on 16, Sept. 1986. In 1988 E co. moved to Darmstadt, Germany. Company E (LRS) saw repeated deployments to Bosnia and Kosovo and two deployments in support of the invasion and occupation of Iraq. It was inactivated in April 2007.

=== 1st Battalion ===
HHC, 1st Battalion, 51st Infantry, bearing the lineage of the former Company A, 51st Infantry, was reassigned from the 4th Armored Division in 1957 to the 2d Armored Division in Germany. In 1963 the unit was reassigned to the 4th Armored Division. On 10 May 1971, the colors of the 4th Armored Division were inactivated, and the unit was reflagged as the 1st Armored Division; concurrently, the 1st Battalion was assigned to the 1st Armored Division. The 1st Battalion (Mechanized), 51st Infantry; the 1st Battalion, 6th Infantry; and the 2d Battalion, 37th Armor formed the maneuver elements of the 1st Brigade, 1st Armored Division at McKee Barracks in Crailsheim. The unit salute greeting was "Fixed Bayonets."

The 1st Battalion (Mechanized), 51st Infantry was inactivated on 16 June 1984, when the 1st Armored Division converted to the Division 86 force structure. Under this structure, each heavy division decreased by one infantry battalion while remaining infantry battalions gained one additional rifle company.

On 10 April 1984 Company C, 1-51st moved from McKee Barracks to Storck Barracks, Illesheim and was reflagged as Company D, 1st Battalion, 6th Infantry.

On 24 April 1984, Company A, 1-51st moved from McKee Barracks to Warner Barracks, Bamberg and was reflagged as Company D, 1st Battalion, 54th Infantry.

On 1 May 1984, Company B, 1-51st moved to Ferris Barracks, Erlangen and was reflagged as Company D, 2d Battalion, 6th Infantry.

Once the infantry companies moved, the battalion scout platoon moved to Storck Barracks, Illesheim and became the Scout Platoon, HHC, 1st Brigade. HHC and Combat Support Company (CSC) assets and personnel were reassigned, and remaining equipment turned in or laterally transferred.

== Heraldry ==
=== Coat of arms ===
The regiment's crest shows a wreath of the colors (Or and Azure) a ragged tree trunk eradicated Proper. The shield is blue for Infantry, with the bend taken from the coat of arms of Alsace. The ragged tree trunk symbolizes the Meuse-Argonne operations.

=== Distinctive unit insignia ===
- Description

A gold metal and enamel device 1 5/32 inches (2.9 cm) in height overall consisting of a shield blazoned: Azure, a bend Or. Attached below the shield a blue motto scroll inscribed "I SERVE" in gold letters.

- Symbolism

The shield is blue for Infantry, with the bend taken from the coat of arms of Alsace.
