= List of United States Army four-star generals =

Flag of an Army four-star general

The rank of general (or full general, or four-star general) is the highest rank normally achievable in the United States Army. It ranks above lieutenant general (three-star general) and below general of the Army (five-star general).

There have been 265 four-star generals in the history of the U.S. Army. Of these, 251 achieved that rank while on active duty in the U.S. Army; eight were promoted after retirement; five were promoted posthumously; and one (George Washington) was appointed to that rank in the Continental Army, the U.S. Army's predecessor. Generals entered the Army via several paths: 165 were commissioned via the U.S. Military Academy (USMA), 56 via Reserve Officers' Training Corps (ROTC) at a civilian university, 16 via Officer Candidate School (OCS), 13 via direct commission (direct), 11 via ROTC at a senior military college, one via ROTC at a military junior college, one via direct commission in the Army National Guard (ARNG), one via the aviation cadet program, and one via battlefield commission.

== List of generals ==
Entries in the following list of four-star generals are indexed by the numerical order in which each officer was promoted to that rank while on active duty, or by an asterisk (*) if the officer did not serve in that rank while on active duty in the U.S. Army. Each entry lists the general's name, date of rank, (Note: Dates of rank are taken, where available, from the U.S. Army register of active and retired commissioned officers, or from the World Almanac and Book of Facts. The date listed is that of the officer's first promotion to general.) active-duty positions held while serving at four-star rank, (Note: Positions listed are those held by the officer when promoted to general. Dates listed are for the officer's full tenure, which may predate promotion to four-star rank or postdate retirement from active duty.) number of years of active-duty service at four-star rank (Yrs), (Note: The number of years of active-duty service at four-star rank is approximated by subtracting the year in the "Date of rank" column from the last year in the "Position" column. Time spent between active-duty four-star assignments is not counted.) year commissioned and source of commission, (Note: Sources of commission are listed in parentheses after the year of commission and include: the United States Military Academy (USMA); Reserve Officer Training Corps (ROTC) at a civilian university; ROTC at a senior military college such as the Virginia Military Institute (VMI), Norwich University (Norwich), Pennsylvania Military College (PMC), or The Citadel (Citadel); Officer Candidate School (OCS); the aviation cadet program (cadet); the Army National Guard (ARNG); direct commission (direct); and battlefield commission (battlefield).) number of years in commission when promoted to four-star rank (YC), (Note: The number of years in commission before being promoted to four-star rank is approximated by subtracting the year in the "Commission" column from the year in the "Date of rank" column.) and other biographical notes. (Note: Notes include years of birth and death; awards of the Medal of Honor, Congressional Gold Medal, Presidential Medal of Freedom, or honors of similar significance; major government appointments; university presidencies, executive leadership of major military non-profit organizations, or equivalents; familial relationships with other four-star officers or significant government officials such as U.S. Presidents, cabinet secretaries, U.S. Senators, or state governors; and unusual career events such as premature relief or death in office.)

List of United States Army four-star generals
| # | Name | Photo | Date of rank | Position | Yrs | Commission | YC | Notes |
|---|---|---|---|---|---|---|---|---|
| * | George Washington | | 15 Jun 1775 | General and Commander in Chief, Continental Army, 1775–1783. | 8 | 1775 (direct) | 0 | (1732–1799) (Note: Commissioned general in the Continental Army, 15 June 1775; resigned, 23 December 1783; commissioned lieutenant general in the U.S. Army, 3 July 1798; posthumously promoted to General of the Armies, 11 October 1976, with date of rank 4 July 1976.) Promoted to General of the Armies, 4 Jul 1976. Chancellor, College of William & Mary, 1788–1799; U.S. President, 1789–1797. Awarded Congressional Gold Medal, 1776. |
| 1 | Ulysses S. Grant | | 25 Jul 1866 | Commanding General, U.S. Army (CGUSA), 1864–1869. | 3 | 1843 (USMA) | 23 | (1822–1885) (Note: Resigned, 4 March 1869, to serve as President; reappointed general and placed on the retired list, 3 March 1885; posthumously promoted to General of the Armies, 19 April 2024.) Promoted to General of the Armies, 19 Apr 2024. U.S. President, 1869–1877. Awarded Congressional Gold Medal, 1863. Married great-aunt of Navy four-star admiral U. S. Grant Sharp Jr. |
| 2 | William Tecumseh Sherman | | 4 Mar 1869 | Commanding General, U.S. Army (CGUSA), 1869–1883. | 14 | 1840 (USMA) | 29 | (1820–1891) Superintendent, Louisiana State Seminary of Learning and Military Academy, 1860–1861. Brother of U.S. Secretary of State John Sherman. |
| 3 | Philip H. Sheridan | | 1 Jun 1888 | Commanding General, U.S. Army (CGUSA), 1883–1888. | 0 | 1853 (USMA) | 35 | (1831–1888) Died in office. |
| 4 | Tasker H. Bliss | | 6 Oct 1917 | Chief of Staff, U.S. Army (CSA), 1917–1918.; U.S. Military Representative, Supreme War Council, 1918–1919. | 2 | 1875 (USMA) | 42 | (1853–1930) (Note: Appointed emergency general as chief of staff of the Army, 6 October 1917; retired as chief of staff, 18 May 1918; brevetted general as member of the Supreme War Council, 20 May 1918.) (Note: Reverted to major general upon expiration of wartime legislation, 1 July 1920; advanced to general on the retired list, 21 June 1930, as highest grade held during World War I.) President, U.S. Army War College, 1903–1905, 1909; Governor, U.S. Soldiers' Home, 1920–1927. |
| 5 | John J. Pershing | | 6 Oct 1917 | Commanding General, American Expeditionary Forces (CG AEF), 1917–1921.; Chief of Staff, U.S. Army (CSA), 1921–1924. | 7 | 1886 (USMA) | 31 | (1860–1948) (Note: Appointed emergency general as commander of U.S. forces in France, 6 October 1917; promoted to General of the Armies, 3 September 1919.) Promoted to General of the Armies, 3 Sep 1919. Chairman, American Battle Monuments Commission, 1923–1948; Chairman, Tacna-Arica Plebiscitary Commission, 1925–1926. Awarded Pulitzer Prize for History, 1932; Congressional Gold Medal, 1946. |
| 6 | Peyton C. March | | 20 May 1918 | Chief of Staff, U.S. Army (CSA), 1918–1921. | 2 | 1888 (USMA) | 30 | (1864–1955) |
| 7 | Charles P. Summerall | | 23 Feb 1929 | Chief of Staff, U.S. Army (CSA), 1926–1930. | 1 | 1892 (USMA) | 37 | (1867–1955) (Note: Appointed ex officio general as chief of staff of the Army, 23 February 1929; reverted to major general, 20 November 1930; retired as general, 31 March 1931.) President, The Citadel, 1931–1953. |
| 8 | Douglas MacArthur | | 21 Nov 1930 | Chief of Staff, U.S. Army (CSA), 1930–1935.; Commanding General, U.S. Army Forces in the Far East (CG USAFFE), 1941–1942.; Commander in Chief, South West Pacific Area (CINCSWPA), 1942–1945.; Commander in Chief, South West Pacific Area/Commander in Chief, U.S. Army Forces in the Pacific (CINCSWPA/CINCAFPAC), 1945.; Supreme Commander, Allied Powers/Commander in Chief, U.S. Army Forces in the Pacific (SCAP/CINCAFPAC), 1945–1947. | 9 | 1903 (USMA) | 27 | (1880–1964) (Note: Reverted to major general, 1 October 1935; retired as general, 31 December 1937; recalled as major general, 26 July 1941; promoted to lieutenant general, 27 July 1941; promoted to general, 18 December 1941, with rank from 16 September 1936; promoted to general of the Army, 18 December 1944; rank made permanent, 11 April 1946; restored to active list, 9 July 1948; relieved of all commands, 11 April 1951.) Promoted to general of the Army, 18 Dec 1944. Superintendent, U.S. Military Academy, 1919–1922. Awarded Medal of Honor, 1942; Congressional Gold Medal, 1962. Grandson of Wisconsin Governor Arthur MacArthur Sr. |
| 9 | Malin Craig | | 2 Oct 1935 | Chief of Staff, U.S. Army (CSA), 1935–1939.; Chairman, War Department Personnel Board, 1941–1945. | 8 | 1898 (USMA) | 37 | (1875–1945) (Note: Retired as general, 31 August 1939; recalled as general, 26 September 1941.) Commandant, U.S. Army War College, 1935. |
| 10 | George C. Marshall Jr. | | 1 Sep 1939 | Chief of Staff, U.S. Army (CSA), 1939–1945. | 5 | 1902 (VMI) (Note: Received a direct commission following graduation from a military college prior to the creation of ROTC.) | 38 | (1880–1959) (Note: Promoted to general of the Army, 16 December 1944; rank made permanent, 11 April 1946; retired as general of the Army, 28 February 1947; restored to active list, 1 March 1949.) Promoted to general of the Army, 16 Dec 1944. Special Representative of the President in China, 1945–1947; U.S. Secretary of State, 1947–1949; Chairman, American Battle Monuments Commission, 1949–1959; President, American Red Cross, 1949–1950; U.S. Secretary of Defense, 1950–1951. Awarded Congressional Gold Medal, 1946; Nobel Peace Prize, 1953. |
| * | John L. Hines | | 15 Jun 1940 | (retired) | 0 | 1891 (USMA) | 49 | (1868–1968) (Note: Advanced to general on the retired list, 15 June 1940, as former chief of staff of the Army.) Chief of Staff, U.S. Army, 1924–1926. |
| 11 | Dwight D. Eisenhower | | 11 Feb 1943 | Commander in Chief, Allied (Expeditionary) Force (CINC Allied Forces), 1942–1943.; Commander in Chief, Allied Forces/Commander in Chief, Mediterranean Theater of Operations/Commanding General, North African Theater of Operations, U.S. Army (CINC Allied Forces/CINC MTO/CG NATOUSA), 1943–1944.; Supreme Commander, Allied Expeditionary Force/Commanding General, European Theater of Operations, U.S. Army (SCAEF/CG ETOUSA), 1944–1945. | 1 | 1915 (USMA) | 28 | (1890–1969) (Note: Promoted to general of the Army, 20 December 1944; rank made permanent, 11 April 1946; retired as general of the Army, 7 February 1948; recalled as general of the Army, 16 December 1950; resigned, 18 July 1952, to run for President; reappointed general of the Army, 30 March 1961.) Promoted to general of the Army, 20 Dec 1944. President, Columbia University, 1948–1953; U.S. President, 1953–1961. |
| 12 | Henry H. Arnold | | 19 Mar 1943 | Commanding General, Army Air Forces (CG AAF), 1942–1944.; Commanding General, Army Air Forces/Commanding General, Twentieth Air Force (CG AAF), 1944–1945. | 1 | 1907 (USMA) | 36 | (1886–1950) (Note: Transferred to U.S. Air Force, 18 September 1947.) (Note: Promoted to general of the Army, 21 December 1944; rank made permanent, 11 April 1946; retired as general of the Army, 30 June 1946; appointed general of the Air Force, 7 May 1949.) Promoted to general of the Army, 21 Dec 1944; to general of the Air Force, 7 May 1949. |
| 13 | Joseph W. Stilwell | | 1 Aug 1944 | Deputy Supreme Allied Commander South East Asia/Commanding General, U.S. Army Forces, China Burma India Theater (DSACSEA/CG USAFCBI), 1943–1944.; Commanding General, Army Ground Forces (CG AGF), 1945.; Commanding General, Tenth Army, 1945.; Commanding General, Western Defense Command, 1945–1946.; Commanding General, Sixth Army, 1946. | 2 | 1904 (USMA) | 40 | (1883–1946) Died in office. |
| 14 | Walter Krueger | | 5 Mar 1945 | Commanding General, Sixth Army, 1943–1946. | 1 | 1901 (direct) | 44 | (1881–1967) (Note: Retired as major general, 31 January 1945; recalled 1 February 1945; promoted to general, 5 March 1945; advanced to general on the retired list, 12 July 1946; retired, 20 July 1946.) |
| 15 | Brehon B. Somervell | | 6 Mar 1945 | Commanding General, Army Service Forces (CG ASF), 1942–1946. | 1 | 1914 (USMA) | 31 | (1892–1955) (Note: Terminated appointment as general in Army of the United States, 29 April 1946; retired as major general, 30 April 1946; advanced to general on the retired list, 4 June 1948.) |
| 16 | Joseph T. McNarney | | 7 Mar 1945 | Deputy Supreme Allied Commander Mediterranean/Commanding General, Mediterranean Theater of Operations, U.S. Army (DSACMED/CG MTOUSA), 1944–1945.; Commanding General, U.S. Forces European Theater/Military Governor, U.S. Occupation Zone in Germany (CG USFET), 1945–1947.; Senior Member, United Nations Military Staff Committee, 1947.; Commanding General, Air Materiel Command (CG AMC), 1947–1949.; Chairman, Department of Defense Management Committee, 1949–1952. | 7 | 1915 (USMA) | 30 | (1893–1972) |
| 17 | Jacob L. Devers | | 8 Mar 1945 | Commanding General, Sixth Army Group, 1944–1945.; Commanding General, Army Ground Forces (CG AGF), 1945–1948.; Chief, Army Field Forces (CAFF), 1948–1949. | 4 | 1909 (USMA) | 36 | (1887–1979) Chairman, American Battle Monuments Commission, 1960–1969. |
| 18 | George C. Kenney | | 9 Mar 1945 | Commanding General, Allied Air Forces, South West Pacific Area (CG AAFSWPA), 1942–1945.; Member, Military Staff Committee of the Joint Chiefs of Staff, 1945–1946.; Commanding General, Strategic Air Command (CG SAC), 1946–1948.; Commander, Air University, 1948–1951. | 6 | 1917 (cadet) | 28 | (1889–1977) |
| 19 | Mark W. Clark | | 10 Mar 1945 | Commanding General, Fifteenth Army Group, 1944–1945.; U.S. High Commissioner, Austria/Commanding General, U.S. Forces Austria, 1945–1947.; Commanding General, Sixth Army, 1947–1949.; Chief, Army Field Forces (CAFF), 1949–1952.; Commander in Chief, United Nations Command/Commander in Chief, Far East Command/Military Governor of the Ryukyu Islands (CINCUNC/CINCFE), 1952–1953. | 8 | 1917 (USMA) | 28 | (1896–1984) (Note: Nomination as U.S. Ambassador to Vatican City withdrawn, 1952.) President, The Citadel, 1954–1965; Chairman, American Battle Monuments Commission, 1969–1984. |
| 20 | Carl A. Spaatz | | 11 Mar 1945 | Commanding General, U.S. Strategic Air Forces in Europe (CG USSAFE), 1945.; Commanding General, U.S. Strategic Air Forces in the Pacific (CG USASTAF), 1945.; Deputy to the Commanding General, Army Air Forces for Special Organizational Planning, 1945–1946.; Commanding General, Army Air Forces (CG AAF), 1946–1947.; Chief of Staff, U.S. Air Force (CSAF), 1947–1948. | 3 | 1914 (USMA) | 31 | (1891–1974) |
| 21 | Omar N. Bradley | | 12 Mar 1945 | Commanding General, Twelfth Army Group, 1944–1945.; Administrator, Veterans Administration, 1945–1947.; Chief of Staff, U.S. Army (CSA), 1948–1949.; Chairman, Joint Chiefs of Staff/Chairman, NATO Military Committee (CJCS), 1949–1950. | 5 | 1915 (USMA) | 30 | (1893–1981) (Note: Promoted to general, 12 March 1945; rank made permanent, 26 June 1948; promoted to general of the Army, 22 September 1950.) Promoted to general of the Army, 22 Sep 1950. Awarded Presidential Medal of Freedom with distinction, 1977. |
| 22 | Thomas T. Handy | | 13 Mar 1945 | Deputy Chief of Staff, U.S. Army (DCSA), 1944–1947.; Commanding General, Fourth Army, 1947–1949.; Commander in Chief, European Command (CINCEUR), 1949–1952.; Commander in Chief, U.S. Army Europe/Commander, Central Army Group (CINCUSAREUR/COMCENTAG), 1952.; Deputy Commander in Chief, U.S. European Command (DCINCEUR), 1952–1954. | 9 | 1916 (VMI) | 29 | (1892–1982) |
| 23 | George S. Patton Jr. | | 14 Apr 1945 | Commanding General, Third Army, 1944–1945.; Commanding General, Fifteenth Army, 1945. | 0 | 1909 (USMA) | 36 | (1885–1945) Died in office. Father-in-law of Army four-star general John K. Waters. |
| 24 | Courtney H. Hodges | | 15 Apr 1945 | Commanding General, First Army, 1944–1949. | 4 | 1909 (direct) | 36 | (1887–1966) |
| 25 | Jonathan M. Wainwright IV | | 5 Sep 1945 | Commanding General, Fourth Army, 1946. | 1 | 1906 (USMA) | 39 | (1883–1953) National Commander, Disabled American Veterans, 1948–1949. Awarded Medal of Honor, 1945. |
| 26 | Lucius D. Clay | | 28 Mar 1947 | Commander in Chief, European Command/Military Governor, U.S. Occupation Zone in Germany (CINCEUR), 1947–1949. | 2 | 1918 (USMA) | 29 | (1897–1978) Special Representative of the President in Berlin, 1961–1962. Son of U.S. Senator Alexander S. Clay; father of Air Force four-star general Lucius D. Clay Jr. |
| 27 | J. Lawton Collins | | 24 Jan 1948 | Vice Chief of Staff, U.S. Army (VCSA), 1948–1949.; Chief of Staff, U.S. Army (CSA), 1949–1953.; U.S. Military Representative, NATO Military Committee (USMILREP), 1953–1956. | 8 | 1917 (USMA) | 31 | (1896–1987) U.S. Special Representative to Vietnam, 1954–1955. |
| 28 | Wade H. Haislip | | 1 Oct 1949 | Vice Chief of Staff, U.S. Army (VCSA), 1949–1951. | 2 | 1912 (USMA) | 37 | (1889–1971) President, Association of the United States Army, 1950–1951; Governor, U.S. Soldiers' Home, 1951–1966. |
| * | Walton H. Walker | | 20 Dec 1950 | (posthumous) | 0 | 1912 (USMA) | 38 | (1889–1950) (Note: Died in car crash, 23 December 1950; posthumously promoted to general, 2 January 1951, with rank from 20 December 1950.) Died in office. Father of Army four-star general Sam S. Walker. |
| 29 | Matthew B. Ridgway | | 11 May 1951 | Supreme Commander, Allied Powers/Commander in Chief, United Nations Command/Commander in Chief, Far East Command/Military Governor of the Ryukyu Islands (SCAP/CINCUNC/CINCFE), 1951.; Commander in Chief, United Nations Command/Commander in Chief, Far East Command/Military Governor of the Ryukyu Islands (CINCUNC/CINCFE), 1951–1952.; Supreme Allied Commander Europe (SACEUR), 1952.; Supreme Allied Commander Europe/Commander in Chief, U.S. European Command (SACEUR/USCINCEUR), 1952–1953.; Chief of Staff, U.S. Army (CSA), 1953–1955. | 4 | 1917 (USMA) | 34 | (1895–1993) Awarded Presidential Medal of Freedom, 1986; Congressional Gold Medal, 1990. |
| 30 | Walter Bedell Smith | | 1 Jul 1951 | Director of Central Intelligence (DCI), 1950–1953. | 2 | 1917 (direct) | 34 | (1895–1961) U.S. Ambassador to the Soviet Union, 1946–1948; U.S. Under Secretary of State, 1953–1954. |
| 31 | John E. Hull | | 30 Jul 1951 | Vice Chief of Staff, U.S. Army (VCSA), 1951–1953.; Commander in Chief, United Nations Command/Commander in Chief, Far East Command/Military Governor of the Ryukyu Islands (CINCUNC/CINCFE), 1953–1955. | 4 | 1917 (direct) | 34 | (1895–1975) Chairman, President's Board of Consultants on Foreign Intelligence Activities, 1958–1961. |
| 32 | James A. Van Fleet | | 31 Jul 1951 | Commanding General, Eighth U.S. Army (CG EUSA), 1951–1953. | 2 | 1915 (USMA) | 36 | (1892–1992) Special Representative of the President in the Far East, 1954. |
| 33 | Alfred M. Gruenther | | 1 Aug 1951 | Chief of Staff, Supreme Headquarters Allied Powers Europe (COFS SHAPE), 1951–1953.; Supreme Allied Commander Europe/Commander in Chief, U.S. European Command (SACEUR/USCINCEUR), 1953–1956. | 5 | 1917 (USMA) | 34 | (1899–1983) President, American Red Cross, 1957–1964. |
| 34 | John R. Hodge | | 5 Jul 1952 | Chief, Army Field Forces (CAFF), 1952–1953. | 1 | 1917 (direct) | 35 | (1893–1963) |
| 35 | Maxwell D. Taylor | | 23 Jun 1953 | Commanding General, Eighth U.S. Army (CG EUSA), 1953–1954.; Commanding General, U.S. Army Forces Far East/Commanding General, Eighth U.S. Army (CG USAFFE/CG EUSA), 1954–1955.; Commander in Chief, United Nations Command/Commander in Chief, Far East Command/Military Governor of the Ryukyu Islands (CINCUNC/CINCFE), 1955.; Chief of Staff, U.S. Army (CSA), 1955–1959.; Military Representative of the President (MILREP), 1961–1962.; Chairman, Joint Chiefs of Staff (CJCS), 1962–1964. | 9 | 1922 (USMA) | 31 | (1901–1987) (Note: Retired as general, 1 July 1959; recalled as general, 1 July 1961.) Superintendent, U.S. Military Academy, 1945–1949; U.S. Ambassador to South Vietnam, 1964–1965; Chairman, President's Foreign Intelligence Advisory Board, 1965–1969; President, Institute for Defense Analyses, 1966–1969. |
| 36 | Charles L. Bolte | | 30 Jul 1953 | Commander in Chief, U.S. Army Europe/Commander, Central Army Group (CINCUSAREUR/COMCENTAG), 1953.; Vice Chief of Staff, U.S. Army (VCSA), 1953–1955. | 2 | 1917 (direct) | 36 | (1895–1989) |
| 37 | William M. Hoge | | 23 Oct 1953 | Commander in Chief, U.S. Army Europe/Commander, Central Army Group (CINCUSAREUR/COMCENTAG), 1953–1955. | 2 | 1916 (USMA) | 37 | (1894–1979) |
| * | Robert L. Eichelberger | | 19 Jul 1954 | (retired) | 0 | 1909 (USMA) | 45 | (1886–1961) (Note: Advanced to general on the retired list, 19 July 1954, as a lieutenant general who, during World War II, commanded Army Ground Forces, commanded an army in any of the Theaters of Operations, was commanding general of U.S. forces in China and chief of staff to Chiang Kai-shek, or commanded Western Defense Command.) Superintendent, U.S. Military Academy, 1940–1942. |
| * | Lucian K. Truscott Jr. | | 19 Jul 1954 | (retired) | 0 | 1917 (direct) | 37 | (1895–1965) Deputy Director for Coordination, Central Intelligence Agency, 1953–1959. |
| * | Leonard T. Gerow | | 19 Jul 1954 | (retired) | 0 | 1911 (VMI) | 43 | (1888–1972) |
| * | William H. Simpson | | 19 Jul 1954 | (retired) | 0 | 1909 (USMA) | 45 | (1888–1980) |
| * | Ben Lear | | 19 Jul 1954 | (retired) | 0 | 1901 (direct) | 53 | (1879–1966) |
| * | Simon Bolivar Buckner Jr. | | 19 Jul 1954 | (posthumous) | 0 | 1908 (USMA) | 46 | (1886–1945) Killed in action. Son of Kentucky Governor Simon Bolivar Buckner Sr. |
| * | Alexander M. Patch | | 19 Jul 1954 | (posthumous) | 0 | 1913 (USMA) | 41 | (1889–1945) Died in office. |
| * | Lesley J. McNair | | 19 Jul 1954 | (posthumous) | 0 | 1904 (USMA) | 50 | (1883–1944) Killed in action. |
| * | John L. DeWitt | | 19 Jul 1954 | (retired) | 0 | 1898 (direct) | 56 | (1880–1962) Commandant, U.S. Army War College, 1937–1939. |
| * | Albert C. Wedemeyer | | 19 Jul 1954 | (retired) | 0 | 1918 (USMA) | 36 | (1897–1989) Special Representative of the President in China and Korea, 1947. Awarded Presidential Medal of Freedom, 1985. |
| * | Robert C. Richardson Jr. | | 19 Jul 1954 | (posthumous) | 0 | 1904 (USMA) | 50 | (1882–1954) Military Governor of Hawaii, 1943–1944. |
| 38 | John E. Dahlquist | | 18 Aug 1954 | Chief, Army Field Forces (CAFF), 1953–1955.; Commanding General, U.S. Continental Army Command (CG CONARC), 1955–1956. | 2 | 1917 (direct) | 37 | (1896–1975) |
| 39 | Anthony C. McAuliffe | | 1 Mar 1955 | Commander in Chief, U.S. Army Europe/Commander, Central Army Group (CINCUSAREUR/COMCENTAG), 1955–1956. | 1 | 1918 (USMA) | 37 | (1898–1975) Chairman, New York State Civil Defense Commission, 1960–1963. |
| 40 | Lyman L. Lemnitzer | | 25 Mar 1955 | Commanding General, U.S. Army Forces Far East/Commanding General, Eighth U.S. Army (CG USAFFE/CG EUSA), 1955.; Commander in Chief, United Nations Command/Commander in Chief, Far East Command/Military Governor of the Ryukyu Islands (CINCUNC/CINCFE), 1955–1957.; Vice Chief of Staff, U.S. Army (VCSA), 1957–1959.; Chief of Staff, U.S. Army (CSA), 1959–1960.; Chairman, Joint Chiefs of Staff (CJCS), 1960–1962.; Commander in Chief, U.S. European Command (USCINCEUR), 1962–1963.; Supreme Allied Commander Europe/Commander in Chief, U.S. European Command (SACEUR/USCINCEUR), 1963–1969.; Special Assistant to the Chairman, Joint Chiefs of Staff, 1969. | 14 | 1920 (USMA) | 35 | (1899–1988) (Note: Retired as general, 31 August 1963; recalled as general, 1 September 1963.) President, Association of the United States Army, 1955. Awarded Presidential Medal of Freedom, 1987. |
| 41 | Williston B. Palmer | | 1 May 1955 | Vice Chief of Staff, U.S. Army (VCSA), 1955–1957.; Deputy Commander in Chief, U.S. European Command (DCINCEUR), 1957–1959.; Director of Military Assistance, Office of the Assistant Secretary of Defense for International Security Affairs, 1959–1962. | 7 | 1919 (USMA) | 36 | (1899–1973) (Note: Retired as general, 1 December 1959; recalled as general, January 1960.) Brother of Army four-star general Charles D. Palmer. |
| 42 | Isaac D. White | | 22 Jun 1955 | Commanding General, U.S. Army Forces Far East/Commanding General, Eighth U.S. Army (CG USAFFE/CG EUSA), 1955–1957.; Commander in Chief, U.S. Army Pacific (CINCUSARPAC), 1957–1961. | 6 | 1922 (Norwich) | 33 | (1901–1990) |
| 43 | Willard G. Wyman | | 1 Mar 1956 | Commanding General, U.S. Continental Army Command (CG CONARC), 1956–1958. | 2 | 1919 (USMA) | 37 | (1898–1969) |
| 44 | Cortlandt V. R. Schuyler | | 18 May 1956 | Chief of Staff, Supreme Headquarters Allied Powers Europe (COFS SHAPE), 1953–1959. | 3 | 1922 (USMA) | 34 | (1900–1993) Commissioner, New York State Office of General Services, 1960–1971. |
| 45 | George H. Decker | | 31 May 1956 | Deputy Commander in Chief, U.S. European Command (DCINCEUR), 1956–1957.; Commander in Chief, United Nations Command/Commander, U.S. Forces Korea/Commanding General, Eighth U.S. Army (CINCUNC/COMUSFK/CG EUSA), 1957–1959.; Vice Chief of Staff, U.S. Army (VCSA), 1959–1960.; Chief of Staff, U.S. Army (CSA), 1960–1962. | 6 | 1924 (ROTC) | 32 | (1902–1980) President, Association of the United States Army, 1952–1955. |
| 46 | Henry I. Hodes | | 1 Jun 1956 | Commander in Chief, U.S. Army Europe/Commander, Central Army Group (CINCUSAREUR/COMCENTAG), 1956–1959. | 3 | 1920 (USMA) | 36 | (1899–1962) |
| 47 | Bruce C. Clarke | | 1 Aug 1958 | Commanding General, U.S. Continental Army Command (CG CONARC), 1958–1960.; Commander in Chief, U.S. Army Europe/Commander, Central Army Group (CINCUSAREUR/COMCENTAG), 1960–1962. | 4 | 1925 (USMA) | 33 | (1901–1988) |
| 48 | Clyde D. Eddleman | | 1 Apr 1959 | Commander in Chief, U.S. Army Europe/Commander, Central Army Group (CINCUSAREUR/COMCENTAG), 1959–1960.; Vice Chief of Staff, U.S. Army (VCSA), 1960–1962. | 3 | 1924 (USMA) | 35 | (1902–1992) Commandant, U.S. Army War College, 1955. |
| 49 | Carter B. Magruder | | 1 Jul 1959 | Commander in Chief, United Nations Command/Commander, U.S. Forces Korea/Commanding General, Eighth U.S. Army (CINCUNC/COMUSFK/CG EUSA), 1959–1961. | 2 | 1923 (USMA) | 36 | (1900–1988) |
| 50 | Charles D. Palmer | | 1 Oct 1959 | Deputy Commander in Chief, U.S. European Command (DCINCEUR), 1959–1962. | 3 | 1924 (USMA) | 35 | (1902–1999) Brother of Army four-star general Williston B. Palmer. |
| 51 | Clark L. Ruffner | | 1 Mar 1960 | U.S. Military Representative, NATO Military Committee (USMILREP), 1960–1962. | 2 | 1924 (VMI) | 36 | (1903–1982) |
| 52 | James E. Moore | | 21 Apr 1960 | Chief of Staff, Supreme Headquarters Allied Powers Europe (COFS SHAPE), 1959–1963. | 3 | 1924 (USMA) | 36 | (1902–1986) Commandant, U.S. Army War College, 1953–1955; U.S. High Commissioner, Ryukyu Islands, 1955–1958. |
| 53 | Herbert B. Powell | | 1 Oct 1960 | Commanding General, U.S. Continental Army Command (CG CONARC), 1960–1963. | 3 | 1926 (ROTC) | 34 | (1903–1998) U.S. Ambassador to New Zealand and Samoa, 1963–1967. |
| 54 | James F. Collins | | 1 Apr 1961 | Commander in Chief, U.S. Army Pacific (CINCUSARPAC), 1961–1964. | 3 | 1927 (USMA) | 34 | (1905–1989) President, American Red Cross, 1964–1970. |
| 55 | Guy S. Meloy Jr. | | 1 Jul 1961 | Commander in Chief, United Nations Command/Commander, U.S. Forces Korea/Commanding General, Eighth U.S. Army (CINCUNC/COMUSFK/CG EUSA), 1961–1963. | 2 | 1927 (USMA) | 34 | (1903–1964) |
| 56 | Paul D. Adams | | 3 Oct 1961 | Commander in Chief, U.S. Strike Command (USCINCSTRIKE), 1961–1963.; Commander in Chief, U.S. Strike Command/U.S. Commander in Chief, Middle East, Africa South of the Sahara, and South Asia (USCINCSTRIKE/USCINCMEAFSA), 1963–1966. | 5 | 1928 (USMA) | 33 | (1906–1987) |
| 57 | Paul D. Harkins | | 2 Jan 1962 | Commander, U.S. Military Assistance Command, Vietnam (COMUSMACV), 1962–1964. | 2 | 1929 (USMA) | 33 | (1904–1984) Relieved, 1964. |
| 58 | Earle G. Wheeler | | 1 Mar 1962 | Deputy Commander in Chief, U.S. European Command (DCINCEUR), 1962.; Chief of Staff, U.S. Army (CSA), 1962–1964.; Chairman, Joint Chiefs of Staff (CJCS), 1964–1970. | 8 | 1932 (USMA) | 30 | (1908–1975) Widow married Army four-star general Frank S. Besson Jr. |
| 59 | Barksdale Hamlett | | 2 Apr 1962 | Vice Chief of Staff, U.S. Army (VCSA), 1962–1964. | 2 | 1930 (USMA) | 32 | (1908–1979) President, Norwich University, 1966–1972. |
| 60 | Paul L. Freeman Jr. | | 1 May 1962 | Commander in Chief, U.S. Army Europe/Commander, Central Army Group (CINCUSAREUR/COMCENTAG), 1962–1965.; Commanding General, U.S. Continental Army Command (CG CONARC), 1965–1967. | 5 | 1929 (USMA) | 33 | (1907–1988) |
| 61 | Robert J. Wood | | 1 Sep 1962 | Director of Military Assistance, Office of the Assistant Secretary of Defense for International Security Affairs, 1962–1965.; Director, Overseas Base Requirements Study Group, 1968–1969. | 4 | 1930 (USMA) | 32 | (1905–1986) (Note: Retired as general, 1 September 1965; recalled as general, 1 February 1968.) |
| 62 | John K. Waters | | 28 Feb 1963 | Commanding General, U.S. Continental Army Command (CG CONARC), 1963–1964.; Commander in Chief, U.S. Army Pacific (CINCUSARPAC), 1964–1966. | 3 | 1931 (USMA) | 32 | (1906–1989) Son-in-law of Army four-star general George S. Patton. |
| 63 | Andrew P. O'Meara | | 6 Jun 1963 | Commander in Chief, U.S. Southern Command (USCINCSO), 1961–1965.; Commander in Chief, U.S. Army Europe/Commander, Central Army Group (CINCUSAREUR/COMCENTAG), 1965–1967. | 4 | 1930 (USMA) | 33 | (1907–2005) |
| 64 | Theodore W. Parker | | 1 Jul 1963 | Chief of Staff, Supreme Headquarters Allied Powers Europe (COFS SHAPE), 1963–1969. | 6 | 1931 (USMA) | 32 | (1909–1994) Commissioner, New York State Department of Transportation, 1969–1972. |
| 65 | Hamilton H. Howze | | 1 Aug 1963 | Commander in Chief, United Nations Command/Commander, U.S. Forces Korea/Commanding General, Eighth U.S. Army (CINCUNC/COMUSFK/CG EUSA), 1963–1965. | 2 | 1930 (USMA) | 33 | (1908–1998) |
| 66 | Hugh P. Harris | | 1 Mar 1964 | Commanding General, U.S. Continental Army Command (CG CONARC), 1964–1965. | 1 | 1931 (USMA) | 33 | (1909–1979) President, The Citadel, 1965–1970. |
| 67 | Frank S. Besson Jr. | | 27 May 1964 | Commanding General, U.S. Army Materiel Command (CG AMC), 1962–1969.; Chairman, Joint Logistics Review Board, 1969–1970. | 6 | 1932 (USMA) | 32 | (1910–1985) (Note: Retired as general, July 1970; recalled as general, August 1970.) Incorporator, National Rail Passenger Corporation, 1970–1971; Member, Board of Directors, Amtrak, 1971–1977. Married widow of Army four-star general Earle G. Wheeler. |
| 68 | Harold K. Johnson | | 3 Jul 1964 | Chief of Staff, U.S. Army (CSA), 1964–1968. | 4 | 1933 (USMA) | 31 | (1912–1983) |
| 69 | William C. Westmoreland | | 1 Aug 1964 | Commander, U.S. Military Assistance Command, Vietnam (COMUSMACV), 1964–1965.; Commander, U.S. Military Assistance Command, Vietnam/Commanding General, U.S. Army Vietnam (COMUSMACV/CG USARV), 1965–1968.; Chief of Staff, U.S. Army (CSA), 1968–1972. | 8 | 1936 (USMA) | 28 | (1914–2005) Superintendent, U.S. Military Academy, 1960–1963; candidate for Republican Party nomination for Governor of South Carolina, 1974. |
| 70 | Creighton W. Abrams Jr. | | 4 Sep 1964 | Vice Chief of Staff, U.S. Army (VCSA), 1964–1967.; Deputy Commander, U.S. Military Assistance Command, Vietnam (Deputy COMUSMACV), 1967–1968.; Commander, U.S. Military Assistance Command, Vietnam/Commanding General, U.S. Army Vietnam (COMUSMACV/CG USARV), 1968–1972.; Chief of Staff, U.S. Army (CSA), 1972–1974. | 10 | 1936 (USMA) | 28 | (1914–1974) Died in office. Father of Army four-star generals John N. Abrams and Robert B. Abrams. |
| 71 | Robert W. Porter Jr. | | 18 Mar 1965 | Commander in Chief, U.S. Southern Command (USCINCSO), 1965–1969. | 4 | 1930 (USMA) | 35 | (1908–2000) |
| 72 | Dwight E. Beach | | 1 Jul 1965 | Commander in Chief, United Nations Command/Commander, U.S. Forces Korea/Commanding General, Eighth U.S. Army (CINCUNC/COMUSFK/CG EUSA), 1965–1966.; Commander in Chief, U.S. Army Pacific (CINCUSARPAC), 1966–1968. | 3 | 1932 (USMA) | 33 | (1908–2000) |
| 73 | Charles H. Bonesteel III | | 1 Sep 1966 | Commander in Chief, United Nations Command/Commander, U.S. Forces Korea/Commanding General, Eighth U.S. Army (CINCUNC/COMUSFK/CG EUSA), 1966–1969. | 3 | 1931 (USMA) | 35 | (1909–1977) |
| 74 | Theodore J. Conway | | 1 Nov 1966 | Commander in Chief, U.S. Strike Command/U.S. Commander in Chief, Middle East, Africa South of the Sahara, and South Asia (USCINCSTRIKE/USCINCMEAFSA), 1966–1969. | 3 | 1933 (USMA) | 33 | (1909–1990) |
| 75 | James H. Polk | | 31 May 1967 | Commander in Chief, U.S. Army Europe and Seventh Army/Commander, Central Army Group (CINCUSAREUR/COMCENTAG), 1967–1971. | 4 | 1933 (USMA) | 34 | (1911–1992) Distant cousin of U.S. President James K. Polk. |
| 76 | Ralph E. Haines Jr. | | 1 Jun 1967 | Vice Chief of Staff, U.S. Army (VCSA), 1967–1968.; Commander in Chief, U.S. Army Pacific (CINCUSARPAC), 1968–1970.; Commanding General, U.S. Continental Army Command (CG CONARC), 1970–1973. | 6 | 1935 (USMA) | 32 | (1913–2011) |
| 77 | James K. Woolnough | | 1 Jul 1967 | Commanding General, U.S. Continental Army Command (CG CONARC), 1967–1970. | 3 | 1932 (USMA) | 35 | (1910–1996) |
| 78 | Andrew J. Goodpaster | | 3 Jul 1968 | Deputy Commander, U.S. Military Assistance Command, Vietnam (Deputy COMUSMACV), 1968.; Supreme Allied Commander Europe/Commander in Chief, U.S. European Command (SACEUR/USCINCEUR), 1969–1974. | 6 | 1939 (USMA) | 29 | (1915–2005) (Note: Retired as general, December 1974; recalled as lieutenant general, June 1977; retired as general, July 1981.) White House Staff Secretary, 1954–1961; Superintendent, U.S. Military Academy, 1977–1981; President, Institute for Defense Analyses, 1983–1985; Chairman, American Battle Monuments Commission, 1985–1990. Awarded Presidential Medal of Freedom, 1984. |
| 79 | Ben Harrell | | 4 Jul 1968 | Commander, Allied Land Forces South-Eastern Europe (COMLANDSOUTHEAST), 1968–1971. | 3 | 1933 (USMA) | 35 | (1911–1981) |
| 80 | Berton E. Spivy Jr. | | 31 Jul 1968 | U.S. Military Representative, NATO Military Committee (USMILREP), 1968–1971. | 3 | 1934 (USMA) | 34 | (1911–1997) |
| 81 | Bruce Palmer Jr. | | 1 Aug 1968 | Vice Chief of Staff, U.S. Army (VCSA), 1968–1973.; Commander in Chief, U.S. Readiness Command (USCINCRED), 1973–1974. | 6 | 1936 (USMA) | 32 | (1913–2000) |
| 82 | George R. Mather | | 1 Mar 1969 | Commander in Chief, U.S. Southern Command (USCINCSO), 1969–1971. | 2 | 1932 (USMA) | 37 | (1911–1993) |
| 83 | Ferdinand J. Chesarek | | 10 Mar 1969 | Commanding General, U.S. Army Materiel Command (CG AMC), 1969–1970. | 1 | 1938 (USMA) | 31 | (1914–1993) |
| 84 | William B. Rosson | | 15 May 1969 | Deputy Commander, U.S. Military Assistance Command, Vietnam (Deputy COMUSMACV), 1969–1970.; Commander in Chief, U.S. Army Pacific (CINCUSARPAC), 1970–1973.; Commander in Chief, U.S. Southern Command (USCINCSO), 1973–1975. | 6 | 1940 (ROTC) | 29 | (1918–2004) |
| 85 | John L. Throckmorton | | 1 Aug 1969 | Commander in Chief, U.S. Strike Command/U.S. Commander in Chief, Middle East, Africa South of the Sahara, and South Asia (USCINCSTRIKE/USCINCMEAFSA), 1969–1972.; Commander in Chief, U.S. Readiness Command (USCINCRED), 1972–1973. | 4 | 1935 (USMA) | 34 | (1913–1986) |
| 86 | John H. Michaelis | | 1 Oct 1969 | Commander in Chief, United Nations Command/Commander, U.S. Forces Korea/Commanding General, Eighth U.S. Army (CINCUNC/COMUSFK/CG EUSA), 1969–1972. | 3 | 1936 (USMA) | 33 | (1912–1985) |
| 87 | Lewis B. Hershey | | 23 Dec 1969 | Presidential Advisor on Manpower Mobilization, 1970–1973. | 4 | 1913 (ARNG) | 56 | (1893–1977) (Note: Transferred from Army National Guard to Regular Army, 18 October 1920; retired as major general, 31 December 1946; recalled as major general on the retired list, 1 January 1947; promoted to lieutenant general, 23 June 1956; promoted to general, 16 February 1970, with date of rank 23 December 1969; relieved, 9 April 1973; retired as general, 10 April 1973.) Relieved, 1973. Director, Selective Service System, 1941–1970. |
| 88 | Frederick C. Weyand | | 31 Oct 1970 | Deputy Commander, U.S. Military Assistance Command, Vietnam (Deputy COMUSMACV), 1970–1972.; Commander, U.S. Military Assistance Command, Vietnam/Commanding General, U.S. Army Vietnam (COMUSMACV/CG USARV), 1972–1973.; Commander in Chief, U.S. Army Pacific (CINCUSARPAC), 1973.; Vice Chief of Staff, U.S. Army (VCSA), 1973–1974.; Chief of Staff, U.S. Army (CSA), 1974–1976. | 6 | 1938 (ROTC) | 32 | (1916–2010) |
| 89 | Henry A. Miley Jr. | | 1 Nov 1970 | Commanding General, U.S. Army Materiel Command (CG AMC), 1970–1975. | 5 | 1940 (USMA) | 30 | (1915–2010) |
| 90 | Frank T. Mildren | | 1 Apr 1971 | Commander, Allied Land Forces South-Eastern Europe (COMLANDSOUTHEAST), 1971–1973. | 2 | 1939 (USMA) | 32 | (1913–1990) |
| 91 | Michael S. Davison | | 26 May 1971 | Commander in Chief, U.S. Army Europe and Seventh Army/Commander, Central Army Group (CINCUSAREUR/COMCENTAG), 1971–1975. | 4 | 1939 (USMA) | 32 | (1917–2006) Aunt married Navy four-star admiral Arthur W. Radford. |
| 92 | George V. Underwood Jr. | | 1 Oct 1971 | Commander in Chief, U.S. Southern Command (USCINCSO), 1971–1973. | 2 | 1937 (USMA) | 34 | (1913–1984) |
| 93 | Donald V. Bennett | | 1 Sep 1972 | Commander in Chief, United Nations Command/Commander, U.S. Forces Korea/Commanding General, Eighth U.S. Army (CINCUNC/COMUSFK/CG EUSA), 1972–1973.; Commander in Chief, U.S. Army Pacific (CINCUSARPAC), 1973–1974. | 2 | 1940 (USMA) | 32 | (1915–2005) Superintendent, U.S. Military Academy, 1966–1969; Director, Defense Intelligence Agency, 1969–1972. |
| 94 | Alexander M. Haig Jr. | | 4 Jan 1973 | Vice Chief of Staff, U.S. Army (VCSA), 1973.; White House Chief of Staff, 1973–1974.; Supreme Allied Commander Europe/Commander in Chief, U.S. European Command (SACEUR/USCINCEUR), 1974–1979. | 5 | 1947 (USMA) | 26 | (1924–2010) (Note: Retired as general, 1 August 1973; remained White House chief of staff as civilian until 1974; recalled as general, September 1974.) Deputy National Security Advisor, 1970–1973; U.S. Secretary of State, 1981–1982; candidate for Republican Party nomination for U.S. President, 1988. |
| 95 | Walter T. Kerwin Jr. | | 1 Feb 1973 | Commanding General, U.S. Continental Army Command (CG CONARC), 1973.; Commanding General, U.S. Army Forces Command (CG FORSCOM), 1973–1974.; Vice Chief of Staff, U.S. Army (VCSA), 1974–1978. | 5 | 1939 (USMA) | 34 | (1917–2008) Married widow of Marine Corps four-star general Keith B. McCutcheon. |
| 96 | William E. DePuy | | 1 Jul 1973 | Commanding General, U.S. Army Training and Doctrine Command (CG TRADOC), 1973–1977. | 4 | 1941 (ROTC) | 32 | (1919–1992) |
| 97 | Richard G. Stilwell | | 31 Jul 1973 | Commander in Chief, United Nations Command/Commander, U.S. Forces Korea/Commanding General, Eighth U.S. Army (CINCUNC/COMUSFK/CG EUSA), 1973–1976. | 3 | 1938 (USMA) | 35 | (1917–1991) U.S. Deputy Under Secretary of Defense for Policy, 1981–1985. |
| 98 | Melvin Zais | | 1 Aug 1973 | Commander, Allied Land Forces South-Eastern Europe (COMLANDSOUTHEAST), 1973–1976. | 3 | 1937 (ROTC) | 36 | (1916–1981) |
| 99 | Bernard W. Rogers | | 7 Nov 1974 | Commanding General, U.S. Army Forces Command (CG FORSCOM), 1974–1976.; Chief of Staff, U.S. Army (CSA), 1976–1979.; Supreme Allied Commander Europe/Commander in Chief, U.S. European Command (SACEUR/USCINCEUR), 1979–1987. | 13 | 1943 (USMA) | 31 | (1921–2008) |
| 101 | John J. Hennessey | | 8 Nov 1974 | Commander in Chief, U.S. Readiness Command (USCINCRED), 1974–1979. | 5 | 1944 (USMA) | 30 | (1921–2001) |
| 101 | John R. Deane Jr. | | 12 Feb 1975 | Commanding General, U.S. Army Materiel Command (CG AMC), 1975–1976.; Commanding General, U.S. Army Development and Readiness Command (CG DARCOM), 1976–1977. | 2 | 1942 (USMA) | 33 | (1919–2013) |
| 102 | George S. Blanchard | | 1 Jul 1975 | Commander in Chief, U.S. Army Europe and Seventh Army/Commander, Central Army Group (CINCUSAREUR/COMCENTAG), 1975–1979. | 4 | 1944 (USMA) | 31 | (1920–2006) |
| 103 | William A. Knowlton | | 1 Jun 1976 | Commander, Allied Land Forces South-Eastern Europe (COMLANDSOUTHEAST), 1976–1977.; U.S. Military Representative, NATO Military Committee (USMILREP), 1977–1980. | 4 | 1943 (USMA) | 33 | (1920–2008) Superintendent, U.S. Military Academy, 1970–1974. Father-in-law of Army four-star general David H. Petraeus. |
| 104 | Frederick J. Kroesen Jr. | | 1 Oct 1976 | Commanding General, U.S. Army Forces Command (CG FORSCOM), 1976–1978.; Vice Chief of Staff, U.S. Army (VCSA), 1978–1979.; Commander in Chief, U.S. Army Europe and Seventh Army/Commander, Central Army Group (CINCUSAREUR/COMCENTAG), 1979–1983. | 7 | 1943 (OCS) | 33 | (1923–2020) |
| 105 | John W. Vessey Jr. | | 1 Nov 1976 | Commander in Chief, United Nations Command/Commander, U.S. Forces Korea/Commanding General, Eighth U.S. Army (CINCUNC/COMUSFK/CG EUSA), 1976–1978.; Commander in Chief, United Nations Command/Commander in Chief, ROK/U.S. Combined Forces Command/Commander, U.S. Forces Korea/Commanding General, Eighth U.S. Army (CINCUNC/CINCCFC/COMUSFK/CG EUSA), 1978–1979.; Vice Chief of Staff, U.S. Army (VCSA), 1979–1982.; Chairman, Joint Chiefs of Staff (CJCS), 1982–1985. | 9 | 1944 (battlefield) | 32 | (1922–2016) Special Presidential Emissary to Vietnam for POW/MIA Affairs, 1987–1997. Awarded Presidential Medal of Freedom, 1992. |
| 106 | John R. Guthrie | | 1 May 1977 | Commanding General, U.S. Army Development and Readiness Command (CG DARCOM), 1977–1981. | 4 | 1942 (ROTC) | 35 | (1921–2009) |
| 107 | Sam S. Walker | | Jul 1977 | Commander, Allied Land Forces South-Eastern Europe (COMLANDSOUTHEAST), 1977–1978. | 1 | 1946 (USMA) | 31 | (1925–2015) Superintendent, Virginia Military Institute, 1981–1988. Son of Army four-star general Walton H. Walker. |
| 108 | Donn A. Starry | | 1 Jul 1977 | Commanding General, U.S. Army Training and Doctrine Command (CG TRADOC), 1977–1981.; Commander in Chief, U.S. Readiness Command (USCINCRED), 1981–1983. | 6 | 1948 (USMA) | 29 | (1925–2011) |
| 109 | Robert M. Shoemaker | | 22 Aug 1978 | Commanding General, U.S. Army Forces Command (CG FORSCOM), 1978–1982. | 4 | 1946 (USMA) | 32 | (1924–2017) |
| 110 | Edward C. Meyer | | 22 Jun 1979 | Chief of Staff, U.S. Army (CSA), 1979–1983. | 4 | 1951 (USMA) | 28 | (1928–2020) |
| 111 | John A. Wickham Jr. | | 10 Jul 1979 | Commander in Chief, United Nations Command/Commander in Chief, ROK/U.S. Combined Forces Command/Commander, U.S. Forces Korea/Commanding General, Eighth U.S. Army (CINCUNC/CINCCFC/COMUSFK/CG EUSA), 1979–1982.; Vice Chief of Staff, U.S. Army (VCSA), 1982–1983.; Chief of Staff, U.S. Army (CSA), 1983–1987. | 8 | 1950 (USMA) | 29 | (1928–2024) |
| 112 | Volney F. Warner | | 1 Aug 1979 | Commander in Chief, U.S. Readiness Command (USCINCRED), 1979–1981. | 2 | 1950 (USMA) | 29 | (1926–2019) |
| 113 | Glenn K. Otis | | 1 Aug 1981 | Commanding General, U.S. Army Training and Doctrine Command (CG TRADOC), 1981–1983.; Commander in Chief, U.S. Army Europe and Seventh Army/Commander, Central Army Group (CINCUSAREUR/COMCENTAG), 1983–1988. | 7 | 1953 (USMA) | 28 | (1929–2013) |
| 114 | Donald R. Keith | | 1 Sep 1981 | Commanding General, U.S. Army Development and Readiness Command (CG DARCOM), 1981–1984. | 3 | 1949 (USMA) | 32 | (1927–2004) |
| 115 | Richard E. Cavazos | | 19 Feb 1982 | Commanding General, U.S. Army Forces Command (CG FORSCOM), 1982–1984. | 2 | 1951 (ROTC) | 31 | (1929–2017) Awarded Medal of Honor posthumously, 2025. Brother of U.S. Secretary of Education Lauro Cavazos. First Hispanic to achieve the rank of general in the Army. |
| 116 | Robert W. Sennewald | | 24 May 1982 | Commander in Chief, United Nations Command/Commander in Chief, ROK/U.S. Combined Forces Command/Commander, U.S. Forces Korea/Commanding General, Eighth U.S. Army (CINCUNC/CINCCFC/COMUSFK/CG EUSA), 1982–1984.; Commanding General, U.S. Army Forces Command (CG FORSCOM), 1984–1986. | 4 | 1951 (ROTC) | 31 | (1929–2023) |
| 117 | Roscoe Robinson Jr. | | 30 Aug 1982 | U.S. Military Representative, NATO Military Committee (USMILREP), 1982–1985. | 3 | 1951 (USMA) | 31 | (1928–1993) First African-American to achieve the rank of general in the Army. |
| 118 | William R. Richardson | | 28 Feb 1983 | Commanding General, U.S. Army Training and Doctrine Command (CG TRADOC), 1983–1986. | 3 | 1951 (USMA) | 32 | (1929–2023) |
| 119 | Paul F. Gorman | | 25 May 1983 | Commander in Chief, U.S. Southern Command (USCINCSO), 1983–1985. | 2 | 1950 (USMA) | 33 | (1927–2026) |
| 120 | Wallace H. Nutting | | 25 May 1983 | Commander in Chief, U.S. Readiness Command (USCINCRED), 1983–1985. | 2 | 1950 (USMA) | 33 | (1928–2023) |
| 121 | Maxwell R. Thurman | | 23 Jun 1983 | Vice Chief of Staff, U.S. Army (VCSA), 1983–1987.; Commanding General, U.S. Army Training and Doctrine Command (CG TRADOC), 1987–1989.; Commander in Chief, U.S. Southern Command (USCINCSO), 1989–1990. | 7 | 1953 (ROTC) | 30 | (1931–1995) |
| 122 | William J. Livsey | | 3 May 1984 | Commander in Chief, United Nations Command/Commander in Chief, ROK/U.S. Combined Forces Command/Commander, U.S. Forces Korea/Commanding General, Eighth U.S. Army (CINCUNC/CINCCFC/COMUSFK/CG EUSA), 1984–1987. | 3 | 1952 (ROTC) | 32 | (1931–2016) |
| 123 | Richard H. Thompson | | 29 Jun 1984 | Commanding General, U.S. Army Development and Readiness Command (CG DARCOM), 1984.; Commanding General, U.S. Army Materiel Command (CG AMC), 1984–1987. | 3 | 1950 (direct) | 34 | (1926–2016) |
| 124 | Robert C. Kingston | | 6 Nov 1984 | Commander in Chief, U.S. Central Command (USCINCCENT), 1983–1985. | 1 | 1949 (OCS) | 35 | (1928–2007) |
| 125 | John R. Galvin | | 25 Feb 1985 | Commander in Chief, U.S. Southern Command (USCINCSO), 1985–1987.; Supreme Allied Commander Europe/Commander in Chief, U.S. European Command (SACEUR/USCINCEUR), 1987–1992. | 7 | 1954 (USMA) | 31 | (1929–2015) U.S. Special Representative to Bosnia and Herzegovina, 1994. |
| 126 | Fred K. Mahaffey | | 17 Jun 1985 | Commander in Chief, U.S. Readiness Command (USCINCRED), 1985–1986. | 1 | 1955 (ROTC) | 30 | (1934–1986) Died in office. |
| 127 | Jack N. Merritt | | 1 Dec 1985 | U.S. Military Representative, NATO Military Committee (USMILREP), 1985–1987. | 2 | 1953 (OCS) | 32 | (1930–2018) Commandant, U.S. Army War College, 1980–1982; President, Association of the United States Army, 1988–1998. |
| 128 | Carl E. Vuono | | 1 Jul 1986 | Commanding General, U.S. Army Training and Doctrine Command (CG TRADOC), 1986–1987.; Chief of Staff, U.S. Army (CSA), 1987–1991. | 5 | 1957 (USMA) | 29 | (1934– ) |
| 129 | Joseph T. Palastra Jr. | | 1 Jul 1986 | Commanding General, U.S. Army Forces Command (CG FORSCOM), 1986–1987.; Commander in Chief, U.S. Army Forces Command (CINCFOR), 1987–1989. | 3 | 1954 (USMA) | 32 | (1931–2015) |
| 130 | James J. Lindsay | | 10 Oct 1986 | Commander in Chief, U.S. Readiness Command (USCINCRED), 1986–1987.; Commander in Chief, U.S. Special Operations Command (USCINCSOC), 1987–1990. | 4 | 1953 (OCS) | 33 | (1932–2023) |
| 131 | Louis C. Wagner Jr. | | 13 Apr 1987 | Commanding General, U.S. Army Materiel Command (CG AMC), 1987–1989. | 2 | 1954 (USMA) | 33 | (1932–2025) |
| 132 | Frederick F. Woerner Jr. | | 6 Jun 1987 | Commander in Chief, U.S. Southern Command (USCINCSO), 1987–1989. | 2 | 1955 (USMA) | 32 | (1933–2023) Relieved, 1989. Chairman, American Battle Monuments Commission, 1994–2001. |
| 133 | Arthur E. Brown Jr. | | 24 Jun 1987 | Vice Chief of Staff, U.S. Army (VCSA), 1987–1989. | 2 | 1953 (USMA) | 34 | (1929– ) |
| 134 | Louis C. Menetrey | | 24 Jun 1987 | Commander in Chief, United Nations Command/Commander in Chief, ROK/U.S. Combined Forces Command/Commander, U.S. Forces Korea/Commanding General, Eighth U.S. Army (CINCUNC/CINCCFC/COMUSFK/CG EUSA), 1987–1990. | 3 | 1953 (ROTC) | 34 | (1929–2009) |
| 135 | Crosbie E. Saint | | 24 Jun 1988 | Commander in Chief, U.S. Army Europe and Seventh Army/Commander, Central Army Group (CINCUSAREUR/COMCENTAG), 1988–1992. | 4 | 1958 (USMA) | 30 | (1936–2018) |
| 136 | H. Norman Schwarzkopf Jr. | | 23 Nov 1988 | Commander in Chief, U.S. Central Command (USCINCCENT), 1988–1991. | 3 | 1956 (USMA) | 32 | (1934–2012) Awarded Presidential Medal of Freedom, 1991; Congressional Gold Medal, 1991. |
| 137 | Robert W. RisCassi | | 17 Jan 1989 | Vice Chief of Staff, U.S. Army (VCSA), 1989–1990.; Commander in Chief, United Nations Command/Commander in Chief, ROK/U.S. Combined Forces Command/Commander, U.S. Forces Korea/Commanding General, Eighth U.S. Army (CINCUNC/CINCCFC/COMUSFK/CG EUSA), 1990–1992.; Commander in Chief, United Nations Command/Commander in Chief, ROK/U.S. Combined Forces Command/Commander, U.S. Forces Korea (CINCUNC/CINCCFC/COMUSFK), 1992–1993. | 4 | 1958 (ROTC) | 31 | (1936– ) |
| 138 | Colin L. Powell | | 4 Apr 1989 | Commander in Chief, U.S. Army Forces Command (CINCFOR), 1989.; Chairman, Joint Chiefs of Staff (CJCS), 1989–1993. | 4 | 1958 (ROTC) | 31 | (1937–2021) Deputy National Security Advisor, 1987; National Security Advisor, 1987–1989; U.S. Secretary of State, 2001–2005. Awarded Congressional Gold Medal, 1991; Presidential Medal of Freedom, 1991 and, with distinction, 1993. |
| 139 | John W. Foss | | 2 Aug 1989 | Commanding General, U.S. Army Training and Doctrine Command (CG TRADOC), 1989–1991. | 2 | 1956 (USMA) | 33 | (1933–2020) |
| 140 | Edwin H. Burba Jr. | | 27 Sep 1989 | Commander in Chief, U.S. Army Forces Command (CINCFOR), 1989–1993. | 4 | 1959 (USMA) | 30 | (1936– ) |
| 141 | William G. T. Tuttle Jr. | | 1 Oct 1989 | Commanding General, U.S. Army Materiel Command (CG AMC), 1989–1992. | 3 | 1958 (USMA) | 31 | (1935–2020) |
| 142 | Gordon R. Sullivan | | 4 Jun 1990 | Vice Chief of Staff, U.S. Army (VCSA), 1990–1991.; Chief of Staff, U.S. Army (CSA), 1991–1995. | 5 | 1959 (Norwich) | 31 | (1937–2024) President, Association of the United States Army, 1998–2016. |
| 143 | Carl W. Stiner | | 1 Jul 1990 | Commander in Chief, U.S. Special Operations Command (USCINCSOC), 1990–1993. | 3 | 1958 (ROTC) | 32 | (1936–2022) |
| 144 | George A. Joulwan | | 21 Nov 1990 | Commander in Chief, U.S. Southern Command (USCINCSO), 1990–1993.; Supreme Allied Commander Europe/Commander in Chief, U.S. European Command (SACEUR/USCINCEUR), 1993–1997. | 7 | 1961 (USMA) | 29 | (1939– ) |
| 145 | Dennis J. Reimer | | 21 Jun 1991 | Vice Chief of Staff, U.S. Army (VCSA), 1991–1993.; Commander in Chief, U.S. Army Forces Command (CINCFOR), 1993.; Commanding General, U.S. Army Forces Command (CG FORSCOM), 1993–1995.; Chief of Staff, U.S. Army (CSA), 1995–1999. | 8 | 1962 (USMA) | 29 | (1939– ) |
| 146 | Frederick M. Franks Jr. | | 23 Aug 1991 | Commanding General, U.S. Army Training and Doctrine Command (CG TRADOC), 1991–1994. | 3 | 1959 (USMA) | 32 | (1936– ) Chairman, American Battle Monuments Commission, 2005–2009. |
| 147 | Jimmy D. Ross | | 1 Feb 1992 | Commanding General, U.S. Army Materiel Command (CG AMC), 1992–1994. | 2 | 1958 (ROTC) | 34 | (1936–2012) |
| 148 | John M. D. Shalikashvili | | 24 Jun 1992 | Supreme Allied Commander Europe/Commander in Chief, U.S. European Command (SACEUR/USCINCEUR), 1992–1993.; Chairman, Joint Chiefs of Staff (CJCS), 1993–1997. | 5 | 1959 (OCS) | 33 | (1936–2011) Awarded Presidential Medal of Freedom, 1997. |
| 149 | David M. Maddox | | 9 Jul 1992 | Commander in Chief, U.S. Army Europe and Seventh Army/Commander, Central Army Group (CINCUSAREUR/COMCENTAG), 1992–1993.; Commander in Chief, U.S. Army Europe and Seventh Army (CINCUSAREUR), 1993–1994. | 2 | 1960 (VMI) | 32 | (1938–2026) |
| 150 | J. H. Binford Peay III | | 26 Mar 1993 | Vice Chief of Staff, U.S. Army (VCSA), 1993–1994.; Commander in Chief, U.S. Central Command (USCINCCENT), 1994–1997. | 4 | 1962 (VMI) | 31 | (1940– ) Superintendent, Virginia Military Institute, 2003–2020. |
| 151 | Wayne A. Downing | | 20 May 1993 | Commander in Chief, U.S. Special Operations Command (USCINCSOC), 1993–1996. | 3 | 1962 (USMA) | 31 | (1940–2007) Deputy National Security Advisor for Combating Terrorism, 2001–2002. |
| 152 | Gary E. Luck | | 1 Jul 1993 | Commander in Chief, United Nations Command/Commander in Chief, ROK/U.S. Combined Forces Command/Commander, U.S. Forces Korea (CINCUNC/CINCCFC/COMUSFK), 1993–1996. | 3 | 1960 (ROTC) | 33 | (1937–2024) |
| 153 | Leon E. Salomon | | 11 Feb 1994 | Commanding General, U.S. Army Materiel Command (CG AMC), 1994–1996. | 2 | 1959 (OCS) | 35 | (1936– ) |
| 154 | Barry R. McCaffrey | | 17 Feb 1994 | Commander in Chief, U.S. Southern Command (USCINCSO), 1994–1996. | 2 | 1964 (USMA) | 30 | (1942– ) Director, National Drug Control Policy, 1996–2001. |
| 155 | John H. Tilelli Jr. | | 19 Jul 1994 | Vice Chief of Staff, U.S. Army (VCSA), 1994–1995.; Commanding General, U.S. Army Forces Command (CG FORSCOM), 1995–1996.; Commander in Chief, United Nations Command/Commander in Chief, ROK/U.S. Combined Forces Command/Commander, U.S. Forces Korea (CINCUNC/CINCCFC/COMUSFK), 1996–1999. | 5 | 1963 (PMC) (Note: Graduated from Pennsylvania Military College, which was reorganized as a civilian institution in 1972 and is now Widener University.) | 31 | (1941– ) President, United Service Organizations, 2000–2002. |
| 156 | William W. Hartzog | | 1 Dec 1994 | Commanding General, U.S. Army Training and Doctrine Command (CG TRADOC), 1994–1998. | 4 | 1963 (Citadel) | 31 | (1941–2020) |
| 157 | William W. Crouch | | 1 Jan 1995 | Commander in Chief, U.S. Army Europe and Seventh Army (CINCUSAREUR), 1994–1996.; Commander in Chief, U.S. Army Europe and Seventh Army/Commander, Allied Land Forces Central Europe (CINCUSAREUR/COMLANDCENT), 1996–1997.; Vice Chief of Staff, U.S. Army (VCSA), 1997–1998. | 3 | 1963 (ROTC) | 32 | (1941–2024) |
| 158 | Ronald H. Griffith | | 6 Jun 1995 | Vice Chief of Staff, U.S. Army (VCSA), 1995–1997. | 2 | 1960 (ROTC) | 35 | (1936–2018) |
| 159 | H. Hugh Shelton | | 1 Mar 1996 | Commander in Chief, U.S. Special Operations Command (USCINCSOC), 1996–1997.; Chairman, Joint Chiefs of Staff (CJCS), 1997–2001. | 5 | 1964 (ROTC) | 32 | (1942– ) Awarded Congressional Gold Medal, 2002. |
| 160 | Johnnie E. Wilson | | 1 May 1996 | Commanding General, U.S. Army Materiel Command (CG AMC), 1996–1999. | 3 | 1967 (OCS) | 29 | (1944– ) |
| 161 | Wesley K. Clark | | 21 Jun 1996 | Commander in Chief, U.S. Southern Command (USCINCSO), 1996–1997.; Supreme Allied Commander Europe/Commander in Chief, U.S. European Command (SACEUR/USCINCEUR), 1997–2000. | 4 | 1966 (USMA) | 30 | (1944– ) Candidate for Democratic Party nomination for U.S. President, 2004. Awarded Presidential Medal of Freedom, 2000. |
| 162 | David A. Bramlett | | 1 Sep 1996 | Commanding General, U.S. Army Forces Command (CG FORSCOM), 1996–1998. | 2 | 1964 (USMA) | 32 | (1941– ) |
| 163 | Eric K. Shinseki | | 5 Aug 1997 | Commanding General, U.S. Army Europe and Seventh Army/Commander, Allied Land Forces Central Europe (CG USAREUR/COMLANDCENT), 1997–1998.; Commanding General, U.S. Army Europe and Seventh Army (CG USAREUR), 1998.; Vice Chief of Staff, U.S. Army (VCSA), 1998–1999.; Chief of Staff, U.S. Army (CSA), 1999–2003. | 6 | 1965 (USMA) | 32 | (1942– ) U.S. Secretary of Veterans Affairs, 2009–2014. First Asian-American to achieve four-star rank in any service. |
| 164 | Peter J. Schoomaker | | 4 Oct 1997 | Commander in Chief, U.S. Special Operations Command (USCINCSOC), 1997–2000.; Chief of Staff, U.S. Army (CSA), 2003–2007. | 7 | 1969 (ROTC) | 28 | (1946– ) (Note: Retired as general, November 2000; recalled as general, August 2003.) |
| 165 | Thomas A. Schwartz | | 31 Aug 1998 | Commanding General, U.S. Army Forces Command (CG FORSCOM), 1998–1999.; Commander in Chief, United Nations Command/Commander in Chief, ROK/U.S. Combined Forces Command/Commander, U.S. Forces Korea (CINCUNC/CINCCFC/COMUSFK), 1999–2002. | 4 | 1967 (USMA) | 31 | (1945– ) |
| 166 | John N. Abrams | | 14 Sep 1998 | Commanding General, U.S. Army Training and Doctrine Command (CG TRADOC), 1998–2002. | 4 | 1968 (OCS) | 30 | (1946–2018) Son of Army four-star general Creighton W. Abrams Jr.; brother of Army four-star general Robert B. Abrams. |
| 167 | Montgomery C. Meigs | | 10 Nov 1998 | Commanding General, U.S. Army Europe and Seventh Army (CG USAREUR), 1998–2002. | 4 | 1967 (USMA) | 31 | (1945–2021) Director, Joint Improvised Explosive Device Defeat Organization, 2005–2007. Distant cousin of Navy four-star admiral Montgomery M. Taylor. |
| 168 | John M. Keane | | 22 Jan 1999 | Vice Chief of Staff, U.S. Army (VCSA), 1999–2003. | 4 | 1966 (ROTC) | 33 | (1943– ) Awarded Presidential Medal of Freedom, 2020. |
| 169 | John G. Coburn | | 14 May 1999 | Commanding General, U.S. Army Materiel Command (CG AMC), 1999–2001. | 2 | 1963 (ROTC) | 36 | (1941– ) |
| 170 | John W. Hendrix | | 23 Nov 1999 | Commanding General, U.S. Army Forces Command (CG FORSCOM), 1999–2001. | 2 | 1965 (ROTC) | 34 | (1942– ) |
| 171 | William F. Kernan | | Jul 2000 | Supreme Allied Commander Atlantic/Commander in Chief, U.S. Joint Forces Command (SACLANT/CINCUSJFCOM), 2000–2002. | 2 | 1968 (OCS) | 32 | (1946–2025) |
| 172 | Tommy R. Franks | | 6 Jul 2000 | Commander in Chief, U.S. Central Command (USCINCCENT), 2000–2002.; Commander, U.S. Central Command (CDRUSCENTCOM), 2002–2003. | 3 | 1967 (OCS) | 33 | (1945– ) Awarded Presidential Medal of Freedom, 2004. |
| 173 | Paul J. Kern | | 30 Oct 2001 | Commanding General, U.S. Army Materiel Command (CG AMC), 2001–2004. | 3 | 1967 (USMA) | 34 | (1945– ) |
| 174 | Larry R. Ellis | | 19 Nov 2001 | Commanding General, U.S. Army Forces Command (CG FORSCOM), 2001–2004. | 3 | 1969 (ROTC) | 32 | (1946– ) |
| 175 | Leon J. LaPorte | | 1 May 2002 | Commander in Chief, United Nations Command/Commander in Chief, ROK/U.S. Combined Forces Command/Commander, U.S. Forces Korea (CINCUNC/CINCCFC/COMUSFK), 2002.; Commander, United Nations Command/Commander, ROK/U.S. Combined Forces Command/Commander, U.S. Forces Korea (CDRUNC/CDRCFC/COMUSFK), 2002–2006. | 4 | 1968 (ROTC) | 34 | (1946– ) |
| 176 | James T. Hill | | 18 Aug 2002 | Commander in Chief, U.S. Southern Command (USCINCSO), 2002.; Commander, U.S. Southern Command (CDRUSSOUTHCOM), 2002–2004. | 2 | 1968 (ROTC) | 34 | (1946– ) |
| 177 | Kevin P. Byrnes | | 7 Nov 2002 | Commanding General, U.S. Army Training and Doctrine Command (CG TRADOC), 2002–2005. | 3 | 1969 (OCS) | 33 | (1950– ) (Note: Relieved, August 2005, and retired as lieutenant general.) Relieved, 2005. |
| 178 | Burwell B. Bell III | | 3 Dec 2002 | Commanding General, U.S. Army Europe and Seventh Army (CG USAREUR), 2002–2005.; Commander, United Nations Command/Commander, ROK/U.S. Combined Forces Command/Commander, U.S. Forces Korea (CDRUNC/CDRCFC/COMUSFK), 2006–2008. | 6 | 1969 (ROTC) | 33 | (1947– ) |
| 179 | John P. Abizaid | | 27 Jun 2003 | Commander, U.S. Central Command (CDRUSCENTCOM), 2003–2007. | 4 | 1973 (USMA) | 30 | (1951– ) U.S. Ambassador to Saudi Arabia, 2019–2021. |
| 180 | Bryan D. Brown | | 25 Aug 2003 | Commander, U.S. Special Operations Command (CDRUSSOCOM), 2003–2007. | 4 | 1970 (OCS) | 33 | (1948– ) First army aviator to achieve the rank of general. |
| 181 | George W. Casey Jr. | | 1 Dec 2003 | Vice Chief of Staff, U.S. Army (VCSA), 2003–2004.; Commanding General, Multi-National Force – Iraq (CG MNF-I), 2004–2007.; Chief of Staff, U.S. Army (CSA), 2007–2011. | 8 | 1970 (ROTC) | 33 | (1948– ) |
| 182 | Richard A. Cody | | 24 Jun 2004 | Vice Chief of Staff, U.S. Army (VCSA), 2004–2008. | 4 | 1972 (USMA) | 32 | (1950– ) |
| 183 | Dan K. McNeill | | 1 Jul 2004 | Commanding General, U.S. Army Forces Command (CG FORSCOM), 2004–2007.; Commander, International Security Assistance Force (CDRISAF), 2007–2008. | 4 | 1968 (ROTC) | 36 | (1946– ) |
| 184 | Benjamin S. Griffin | | 5 Nov 2004 | Commanding General, U.S. Army Materiel Command (CG AMC), 2004–2008. | 4 | 1970 (OCS) | 34 | (1946– ) |
| 185 | Bantz J. Craddock | | 1 Jan 2005 | Commander, U.S. Southern Command (CDRUSSOUTHCOM), 2004–2006.; Supreme Allied Commander Europe/Commander, U.S. European Command (SACEUR/CDRUSEUCOM), 2006–2009. | 4 | 1971 (ROTC) | 33 | (1949– ) |
| 186 | William S. Wallace | | 13 Oct 2005 | Commanding General, U.S. Army Training and Doctrine Command (CG TRADOC), 2005–2008. | 3 | 1969 (USMA) | 36 | (1946– ) |
| 187 | David D. McKiernan | | 14 Dec 2005 | Commanding General, U.S. Army Europe and Seventh Army (CG USAREUR), 2005–2008.; Commander, International Security Assistance Force (CDRISAF), 2008.; Commander, International Security Assistance Force/Commander, U.S. Forces – Afghanistan (CDRISAF/CDRUSFOR-A), 2008–2009. | 4 | 1972 (ROTC) | 33 | (1950– ) Resigned, 2009. |
| 188 | William E. Ward | | 3 May 2006 | Deputy Commander, U.S. European Command (DCDRUSEUCOM), 2006–2007.; Commander, U.S. Africa Command (CDRUSAFRICOM), 2007–2011. | 5 | 1971 (ROTC) | 35 | (1949– ) (Note: Reverted to major general, March 2011; retired as lieutenant general, 13 November 2012.) U.S. Security Coordinator, Israel-Palestinian Authority, 2005. |
| 189 | Charles C. Campbell | | 9 Jan 2007 | Commanding General, U.S. Army Forces Command (CG FORSCOM), 2007–2010. | 3 | 1970 (ROTC) | 37 | (1948–2016) |
| 190 | David H. Petraeus | | 10 Feb 2007 | Commanding General, Multi-National Force – Iraq (CG MNF-I), 2007–2008.; Commander, U.S. Central Command (CDRUSCENTCOM), 2008–2010.; Commander, International Security Assistance Force/Commander, U.S. Forces – Afghanistan (CDRISAF/CDRUSFOR-A), 2010–2011. | 4 | 1974 (USMA) | 33 | (1952– ) Director, Central Intelligence Agency, 2011–2012. Son-in-law of Army four-star general William A. Knowlton. |
| 191 | Walter L. Sharp | | 2 Jun 2008 | Commander, United Nations Command/Commander, ROK/U.S. Combined Forces Command/Commander, U.S. Forces Korea (CDRUNC/CDRCFC/CDRUSFK), 2008–2011. | 3 | 1974 (USMA) | 34 | (1952– ) |
| 192 | Peter W. Chiarelli | | 4 Aug 2008 | Vice Chief of Staff, U.S. Army (VCSA), 2008–2012. | 4 | 1972 (ROTC) | 36 | (1950– ) |
| 193 | Carter F. Ham | | 28 Aug 2008 | Commanding General, U.S. Army Europe and Seventh Army (CG USAREUR), 2008–2011.; Commander, U.S. Africa Command (CDRUSAFRICOM), 2011–2013. | 5 | 1976 (ROTC) | 32 | (1952– ) Chairman, National Commission on the Future of the Army, 2015–2016; President, Association of the United States Army, 2016–2021. |
| 194 | Raymond T. Odierno | | 16 Sep 2008 | Commanding General, Multi-National Force – Iraq (CG MNF-I), 2008–2009.; Commanding General, U.S. Forces – Iraq (CG USF-I), 2010.; Commander, U.S. Joint Forces Command (CDRUSJFCOM), 2010–2011.; Chief of Staff, U.S. Army (CSA), 2011–2015. | 7 | 1976 (USMA) | 32 | (1954–2021) (Note: Nomination as Vice Chief of Staff, U.S. Army (VCSA) withdrawn, 2008.) |
| 195 | Ann E. Dunwoody | | 14 Nov 2008 | Commanding General, U.S. Army Materiel Command (CG AMC), 2008–2012. | 4 | 1975 (direct) | 33 | (1953– ) First woman to achieve four-star rank in any service. |
| 196 | Martin E. Dempsey | | 8 Dec 2008 | Commanding General, U.S. Army Training and Doctrine Command (CG TRADOC), 2008–2011.; Chief of Staff, U.S. Army (CSA), 2011.; Chairman, Joint Chiefs of Staff (CJCS), 2011–2015. | 7 | 1974 (USMA) | 34 | (1952– ) |
| 197 | Stanley A. McChrystal | | 15 Jun 2009 | Commander, International Security Assistance Force/Commander, U.S. Forces – Afghanistan (CDRISAF/CDRUSFOR-A), 2009–2010. | 1 | 1976 (USMA) | 33 | (1954– ) Resigned, 2010. |
| 198 | Keith B. Alexander | | 21 May 2010 | Commander, U.S. Cyber Command/Director, National Security Agency/Chief, Central Security Service (CDRUSCYBERCOM/DIRNSA/CCSS), 2010–2014. | 4 | 1974 (USMA) | 36 | (1952– ) Director, National Security Agency, 2005–2014. |
| 199 | James D. Thurman | | 3 Jun 2010 | Commanding General, U.S. Army Forces Command (CG FORSCOM), 2010–2011.; Commander, United Nations Command/Commander, ROK/U.S. Combined Forces Command/Commander, U.S. Forces Korea (CDRUNC/CDRCFC/CDRUSFK), 2011–2013. | 3 | 1975 (ROTC) | 35 | (1953– ) |
| 200 | Lloyd J. Austin III | | 1 Sep 2010 | Commanding General, U.S. Forces – Iraq (CG USF-I), 2010–2011.; Vice Chief of Staff, U.S. Army (VCSA), 2012–2013.; Commander, U.S. Central Command (CDRUSCENTCOM), 2013–2016. | 6 | 1975 (USMA) | 35 | (1953– ) U.S. Secretary of Defense, 2021–2025. |
| 201 | Robert W. Cone | | 29 Apr 2011 | Commanding General, U.S. Army Training and Doctrine Command (CG TRADOC), 2011–2014. | 3 | 1979 (USMA) | 32 | (1957–2016) |
| 202 | Charles H. Jacoby Jr. | | 3 Aug 2011 | Commander, U.S. Northern Command/Commander, North American Aerospace Defense Command (CDRUSNORTHCOM/CDRNORAD), 2011–2014. | 3 | 1978 (USMA) | 33 | (1954– ) |
| 203 | David M. Rodriguez | | 12 Sep 2011 | Commanding General, U.S. Army Forces Command (CG FORSCOM), 2011–2013.; Commander, U.S. Africa Command (CDRUSAFRICOM), 2013–2016. | 5 | 1976 (USMA) | 35 | (1954– ) |
| 204 | Dennis L. Via | | 7 Aug 2012 | Commanding General, U.S. Army Materiel Command (CG AMC), 2012–2016. | 4 | 1980 (ROTC) | 32 | (1958– ) |
| 205 | Frank J. Grass | | 7 Sep 2012 | Chief, National Guard Bureau (CNGB), 2012–2016. | 4 | 1981 (OCS) | 31 | (1951– ) Served 12 years in the enlisted ranks before receiving his commission in 1981. First Army National Guard officer to achieve the rank of general. |
| 206 | John F. Campbell | | 8 Mar 2013 | Vice Chief of Staff, U.S. Army (VCSA), 2013–2014.; Commander, International Security Assistance Force/Commander, U.S. Forces – Afghanistan (CDRISAF/CDRUSFOR-A), 2014–2015.; Commander, Resolute Support Mission/Commander, U.S. Forces – Afghanistan (CDRRS/CDRUSFOR-A), 2015–2016. | 3 | 1979 (USMA) | 34 | (1957– ) |
| 207 | Daniel B. Allyn | | 10 May 2013 | Commanding General, U.S. Army Forces Command (CG FORSCOM), 2013–2014.; Vice Chief of Staff, U.S. Army (VCSA), 2014–2017. | 4 | 1981 (USMA) | 32 | (1959– ) |
| 208 | Vincent K. Brooks | | 2 Jul 2013 | Commanding General, U.S. Army Pacific (CG USARPAC), 2013–2016.; Commander, United Nations Command/Commander, ROK/U.S. Combined Forces Command/Commander, U.S. Forces Korea (CDRUNC/CDRCFC/COMUSFK), 2016–2018. | 5 | 1980 (USMA) | 33 | (1958– ) |
| 209 | Curtis M. Scaparrotti | | 2 Oct 2013 | Commander, United Nations Command/Commander, ROK/U.S. Combined Forces Command/Commander, U.S. Forces Korea (CDRUNC/CDRCFC/COMUSFK), 2013–2016.; Supreme Allied Commander Europe/Commander, U.S. European Command (SACEUR/CDRUSEUCOM), 2016–2019. | 6 | 1978 (USMA) | 35 | (1956– ) |
| 210 | David G. Perkins | | 14 Mar 2014 | Commanding General, U.S. Army Training and Doctrine Command (CG TRADOC), 2014–2015.; Commanding General, U.S. Army Training and Doctrine Command/Chancellor, Army University (CG TRADOC/Ch. ArmyU), 2015–2018. | 4 | 1980 (USMA) | 34 | (1957– ) |
| 211 | Mark A. Milley | | 15 Aug 2014 | Commanding General, U.S. Army Forces Command (CG FORSCOM), 2014–2015.; Chief of Staff, U.S. Army (CSA), 2015–2019.; Chairman, Joint Chiefs of Staff (CJCS), 2019–2023. | 9 | 1980 (ROTC) | 34 | (1958– ) |
| 212 | Joseph L. Votel | | 28 Aug 2014 | Commander, U.S. Special Operations Command (CDRUSSOCOM), 2014–2016.; Commander, U.S. Central Command (CDRUSCENTCOM), 2016–2019. | 5 | 1980 (USMA) | 34 | (1958– ) |
| 213 | Robert B. Abrams | | 10 Aug 2015 | Commanding General, U.S. Army Forces Command (CG FORSCOM), 2015–2018.; Commander, United Nations Command/Commander, ROK/U.S. Combined Forces Command/Commander, U.S. Forces Korea (CDRUNC/CDRCFC/COMUSFK), 2018–2021. | 6 | 1982 (USMA) | 33 | (1960– ) Son of Army four-star general Creighton W. Abrams Jr.; brother of Army four-star general John N. Abrams. |
| 214 | John W. Nicholson Jr. | | 2 Mar 2016 | Commander, Resolute Support Mission/Commander, U.S. Forces – Afghanistan (CDRRS/CDRUSFOR-A), 2016–2018. | 2 | 1982 (USMA) | 34 | (1957– ) Nephew of U.S. Secretary of Veterans Affairs Robert J. Nicholson. |
| 215 | Raymond A. Thomas III | | 30 Mar 2016 | Commander, U.S. Special Operations Command (CDRUSSOCOM), 2016–2019. | 3 | 1980 (USMA) | 36 | (1958– ) |
| 216 | Robert B. Brown | | 30 Apr 2016 | Commanding General, U.S. Army Pacific (CG USARPAC), 2016–2019. | 3 | 1981 (USMA) | 35 | (1959– ) President, Association of the United States Army, 2021–present. |
| 217 | Gustave F. Perna | | 30 Sep 2016 | Commanding General, U.S. Army Materiel Command (CG AMC), 2016–2020.; Chief Operating Officer, Operation Warp Speed (COO OWS), 2020–2021.; Chief Operating Officer, COVID-19 Response for Vaccine and Therapeutics (COO COVID-19 Response), 2021. | 5 | 1981 (VFMAC) | 35 | (1960– ) |
| 218 | James C. McConville | | 16 Jun 2017 | Vice Chief of Staff, U.S. Army (VCSA), 2017–2019.; Chief of Staff, U.S. Army (CSA), 2019–2023. | 6 | 1981 (USMA) | 36 | (1959– ) |
| 219 | Stephen J. Townsend | | 2 Mar 2018 | Commanding General, U.S. Army Training and Doctrine Command/Chancellor, Army University (CG TRADOC/Ch. ArmyU), 2018–2019.; Commander, U.S. Africa Command (CDRUSAFRICOM), 2019–2022. | 4 | 1982 (NGCSU) | 36 | (1959– ) |
| 220 | Paul M. Nakasone | | 4 May 2018 | Commander, U.S. Cyber Command/Director, National Security Agency/Chief, Central Security Service (CDRUSCYBERCOM/DIRNSA/CCSS), 2018–2024. | 6 | 1986 (ROTC) | 32 | (1963– ) |
| 221 | Stephen R. Lyons | | 24 Aug 2018 | Commander, U.S. Transportation Command (CDRUSTRANSCOM), 2018–2021. | 3 | 1983 (ROTC) | 35 | (c. 1962– ) |
| 222 | John M. Murray | | 24 Aug 2018 | Commanding General, U.S. Army Futures Command (CG AFC), 2018–2021. | 3 | 1982 (ROTC) | 36 | (c. 1960– ) |
| 223 | Austin S. Miller | | 2 Sep 2018 | Commander, Resolute Support Mission/Commander, U.S. Forces – Afghanistan (CDRRS/CDRUSFOR-A), 2018–2021. | 3 | 1983 (USMA) | 35 | (1961– ) |
| 224 | Michael X. Garrett | | 21 Mar 2019 | Commanding General, U.S. Army Forces Command (CG FORSCOM), 2019–2022. | 3 | 1984 (ROTC) | 35 | (1961– ) Chairman, American Battle Monuments Commission, 2023–present. |
| 225 | Richard D. Clarke Jr. | | 29 Mar 2019 | Commander, U.S. Special Operations Command (CDRUSSOCOM), 2019–2022. | 3 | 1984 (USMA) | 35 | (1962– ) |
| 226 | Paul E. Funk II | | 21 Jun 2019 | Commanding General, U.S. Army Training and Doctrine Command/Chancellor, Army University (CG TRADOC/Ch. ArmyU), 2019–2022. | 3 | 1984 (ROTC) | 35 | (1962– ) |
| 227 | Joseph M. Martin | | 26 Jul 2019 | Vice Chief of Staff, U.S. Army (VCSA), 2019–2022. | 3 | 1986 (USMA) | 33 | (1962– ) |
| 228 | Paul J. LaCamera | | 18 Nov 2019 | Commanding General, U.S. Army Pacific (CG USARPAC), 2019–2021.; Commander, United Nations Command/Commander, ROK/U.S. Combined Forces Command/Commander, U.S. Forces Korea (CDRUNC/CDRCFC/COMUSFK), 2021–2024. | 5 | 1985 (USMA) | 34 | (1963– ) |
| 229 | Edward M. Daly | | 2 Jul 2020 | Commanding General, U.S. Army Materiel Command (CG AMC), 2020–2023. | 3 | 1987 (USMA) | 33 | (1965– ) |
| 230 | Daniel R. Hokanson | | 3 Aug 2020 | Chief, National Guard Bureau (CNGB), 2020–2024. | 4 | 1986 (USMA) | 34 | (1963– ) |
| 231 | James H. Dickinson | | 20 Aug 2020 | Commander, U.S. Space Command (CDRUSSPACECOM), 2020–2024. | 4 | 1985 (ROTC) | 35 | (c. 1962– ) |
| 232 | Christopher G. Cavoli | | 1 Oct 2020 | Commanding General, U.S. Army Europe and Africa (CG USAREUR-AF), 2020–2022.; Supreme Allied Commander Europe/Commander, U.S. European Command (SACEUR/CDRUSEUCOM), 2022–2025. | 5 | 1987 (ROTC) | 33 | (c. 1964– ) |
| 233 | Charles A. Flynn | | 4 Jun 2021 | Commanding General, U.S. Army Pacific (CG USARPAC), 2021–2024. | 3 | 1985 (ROTC) | 36 | (c. 1963– ) Brother of National Security Advisor Michael T. Flynn. |
| 234 | Laura J. Richardson | | 29 Oct 2021 | Commander, U.S. Southern Command (CDRUSSOUTHCOM), 2021–2024. | 3 | 1986 (ROTC) | 35 | (1963– ) |
| 235 | Michael E. Kurilla | | 1 Apr 2022 | Commander, U.S. Central Command (CDRUSCENTCOM), 2022–2025. | 3 | 1988 (USMA) | 34 | (1966– ) |
| 236 | Darryl A. Williams | | 27 Jun 2022 | Commanding General, U.S. Army Europe and Africa (CG USAREUR-AF), 2022.; Commanding General, U.S. Army Europe and Africa/Commander, Allied Land Command (CG USAREUR-AF/CDRLANDCOM), 2022–2024. | 2 | 1983 (USMA) | 39 | (1961– ) Superintendent, U.S. Military Academy, 2018–2022. |
| 237 | Andrew P. Poppas | | 8 Jul 2022 | Commanding General, U.S. Army Forces Command (CG FORSCOM), 2022–2025. | 3 | 1988 (USMA) | 34 | (c. 1966– ) |
| 238 | Randy A. George | | 5 Aug 2022 | Vice Chief of Staff, U.S. Army (VCSA), 2022–2023.; Chief of Staff, U.S. Army (CSA), 2023–2026. | 4 | 1988 (USMA) | 34 | (1964– ) Relieved, 2026. |
| 239 | Bryan P. Fenton | | 30 Aug 2022 | Commander, U.S. Special Operations Command (CDRUSSOCOM), 2022–2025. | 3 | 1987 (ROTC) | 35 | (1965– ) |
| 240 | Gary M. Brito | | 8 Sep 2022 | Commanding General, U.S. Army Training and Doctrine Command/Chancellor, Army University (CG TRADOC/Ch. ArmyU), 2022–2025. | 3 | 1987 (ROTC) | 35 | (1964– ) |
| 241 | James E. Rainey | | 4 Oct 2022 | Commanding General, U.S. Army Futures Command (CG AFC), 2022–2025. | 3 | 1987 (ROTC) | 35 | (c. 1964– ) |
| 242 | Charles R. Hamilton | | 16 Mar 2023 | Commanding General, U.S. Army Materiel Command (CG AMC), 2023–2024. | 1 | 1988 (OCS) | 35 | (c. 1967– ) Relieved, 2024. Served seven years in the enlisted ranks before receiving his commission in 1988. |
| 243 | James J. Mingus | | 3 Jan 2024 | Vice Chief of Staff, U.S. Army (VCSA), 2024–2026. | 2 | 1985 (ROTC) | 39 | (1964– ) |
| 244 | Ronald P. Clark | | 8 Nov 2024 | Commanding General, U.S. Army Pacific (CG USARPAC), 2024–present. | 2 | 1988 (USMA) | 36 | (1966– ) |
| 245 | Christopher T. Donahue | | 10 Dec 2024 | Commanding General, U.S. Army Europe and Africa/Commander, Allied Land Command (CG USAREUR-AF/CDRLANDCOM), 2024–2026. | 2 | 1992 (USMA) | 32 | (1969– ) |
| 246 | Xavier T. Brunson | | 20 Dec 2024 | Commander, United Nations Command/Commander, ROK/U.S. Combined Forces Command/Commander, U.S. Forces Korea (CDRUNC/CDRCFC/COMUSFK), 2024–present. | 2 | 1990 (ROTC) | 34 | (c. 1965– ) |
| 247 | David M. Hodne | | 2 Oct 2025 | Commanding General, U.S. Army Transformation and Training Command (CG T2COM), 2025–2026. | 1 | 1991 (USMA) | 34 | (1969– ) Relieved, 2026. |
| 248 | Joseph A. Ryan | | 5 Dec 2025 | Commanding General, U.S. Army Western Hemisphere Command (CG USAWHC), 2025–present. | 1 | 1991 (USMA) | 34 | (c. 1969– ) |
| 249 | Thomas M. Carden Jr. | | 16 Jan 2026 | Vice Chief of the National Guard Bureau (VCNGB), 2026–present. | 0 | 1989 (OCS) | 37 | (c. 1968– ) Served three years in the enlisted ranks before receiving his commission in 1989. |
| 250 | Christopher C. LaNeve | | 6 Feb 2026 | Vice Chief of Staff, U.S. Army (VCSA), 2026–present. | 0 | 1990 (ROTC) | 36 | (1967– ) |
| 251 | Joshua M. Rudd | | 20 Mar 2026 | Commander, U.S. Cyber Command/Director, National Security Agency/Chief, Central Security Service (CDRUSCYBERCOM/DIRNSA/CCSS), 2026–present. | 0 | 1993 (ROTC) | 33 | (1971– ) |

== History ==
=== 1775–1799 ===
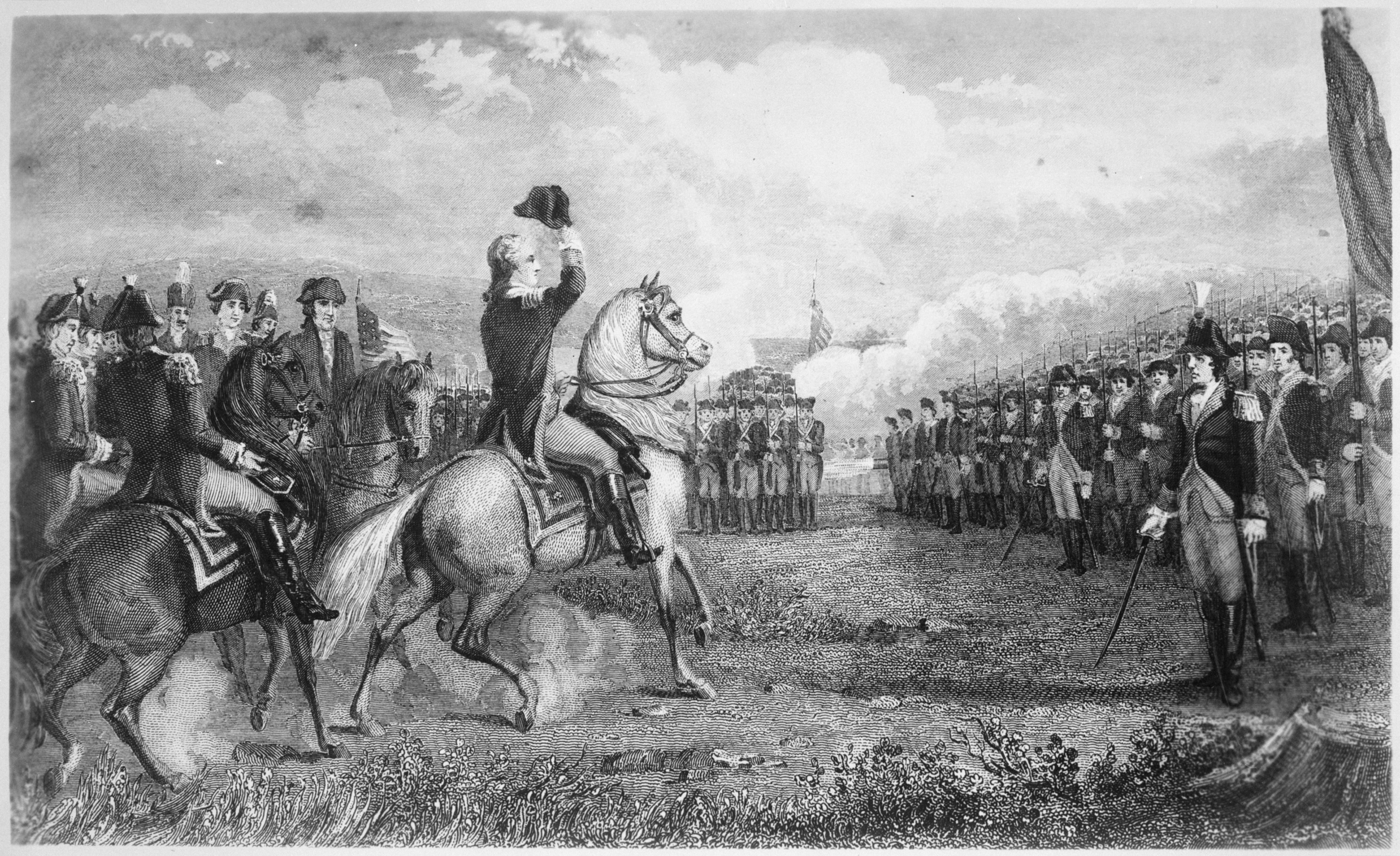
George Washington takes command of the Continental Army, c. 1775.

In June 1775, the Continental Congress appointed George Washington as general and commander in chief of the Continental Army during the Revolutionary War. (Note: On at least one occasion, Washington styled himself "Captain-General and Commander in Chief of the Forces of the Thirteen United Colonies", in his proclamation on the occupation of Boston on 21 March 1776.) At the war's end in 1783, Washington resigned his commission. As this occurred before the establishment of the United States Army in 1784, he is therefore considered never to have held the U.S. Army rank of general.

In May 1798, Washington was commissioned as a lieutenant general in the United States Army by his successor as president, John Adams, to command the provisional army being raised for the undeclared Quasi-War with France. In March 1799, the United States Congress elevated the lieutenant generalcy to the rank of "General of the Armies of the United States", but Adams thought the new rank infringed on his constitutional role as commander in chief and never made the appointment. Washington died later that year, and the rank lapsed when not mentioned in the Military Peace Establishment Act of 1802. He was promoted posthumously to the rank in 1978, after it was reestablished for him as part of the 1976 United States Bicentennial celebrations.

=== 1866–1941 ===
==== Civil War and aftermath ====
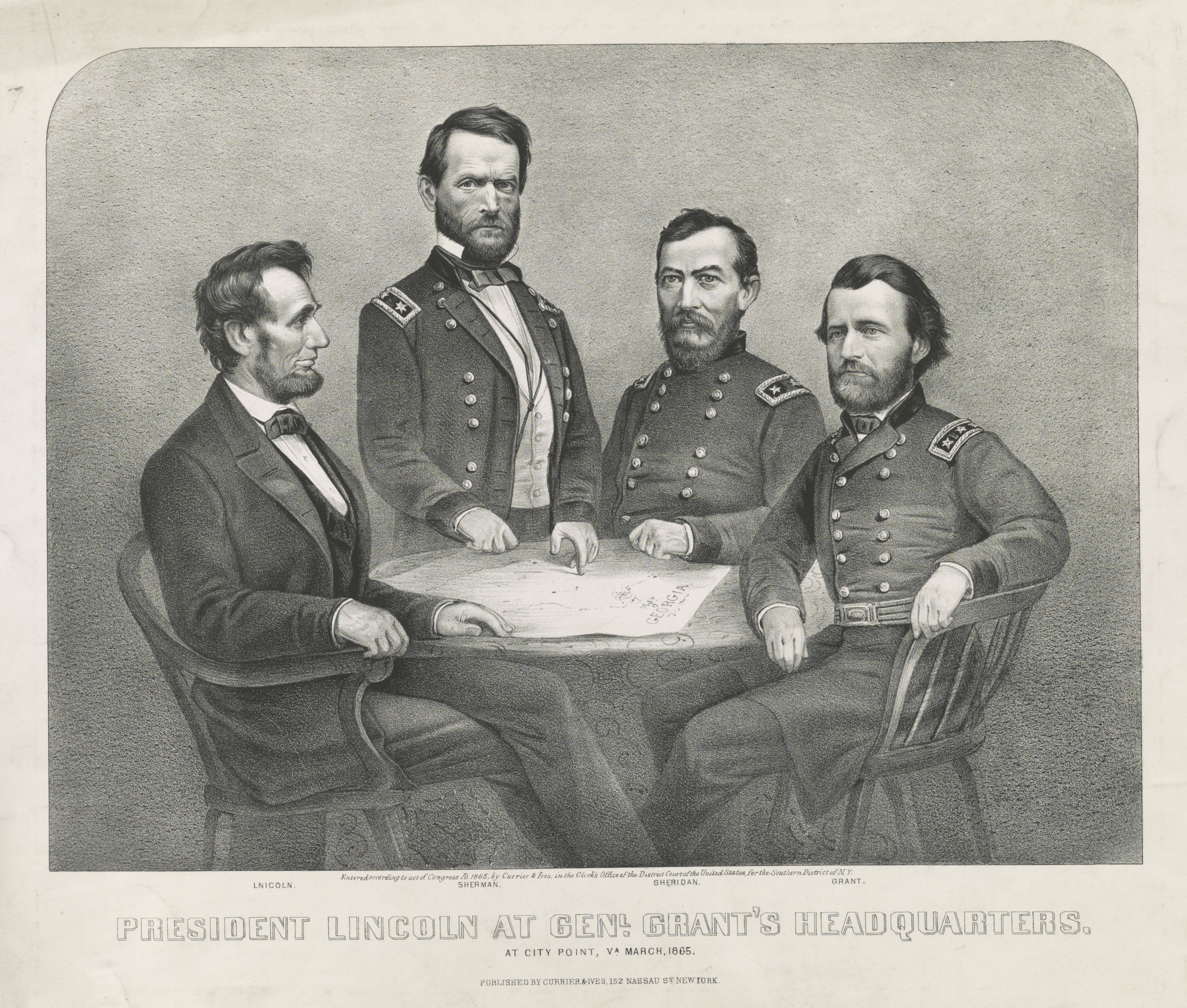
The Civil War-era generals of the Army (Grant, Sherman, and Sheridan) with President Abraham Lincoln, March 1865.

The rank of General of the Armies was revived in 1866, with the name "General of the Army of the United States" to reward the Civil War achievements of Ulysses S. Grant, the commanding general of the United States Army (CGUSA). As with the prior rank and that of lieutenant general revived for Grant in 1864, the holder was authorized to command the armies of the United States, subject to presidential authority. Grant vacated his commission to become president in March 1869, and the lieutenant general of the Army, William Tecumseh Sherman, was promoted to succeed him as general. The grade was abolished after Sherman's retirement in February 1884, in accordance with legislation passed in 1870.

After Sherman's retirement, the ban on new appointments to the grade of general was relaxed twice. In March 1885, Grant was out of office, bankrupt, and dying, so Congress authorized the president to reappoint him to the rank and full pay of general on the retired list. Congress made a similar exception in June 1888 to promote the ailing lieutenant general of the Army, Philip Sheridan, by discontinuing the grade of lieutenant general and merging it with the grade of general until Sheridan's death two months later.

Since there was only one active duty four-star general in the Army during this period, the grade was interchangeably referred to as "general", "the General", and "the General of the Army", a title not to be confused with the five-star grade of general of the Army created in 1944.

==== World War I ====
The rank flag of General of the Armies John J. Pershing, presented to him in 1922.

In 1917, the rank of general was recreated in the National Army, a temporary force of conscripts and volunteers authorized for the duration of the World War I emergency. To give American commanders parity of rank with their Allied counterparts, Congress allowed the president to appoint two emergency generals in the National Army, specified to be the chief of staff of the Army (CSA), Tasker H. Bliss and later Peyton C. March; and the commander of the American Expeditionary Forces (CG AEF) in France, John J. Pershing. When Bliss reached the retirement age of 64 and stepped down as chief of staff, he was reappointed emergency general by brevet to serve alongside full generals from allied nations as the U.S. military representative to the Supreme War Council.

All emergency grades expired at the end of the war, so in July 1919, eight months after the armistice, President Woodrow Wilson asked Congress to reward March and Pershing by making them both permanent generals, with Pershing senior to March. Pershing's promotion was authorized on 3 September 1919, just in time for the secretary of war to hand him his new commission when he returned from Europe. Congress and Pershing both opposed March's promotion, having clashed with him during the war, so he reverted to major general alongside Bliss when their emergency grades expired on 30 June 1920. Both were restored to their wartime ranks of general on the retired list in 1930.

==== Interwar ====
Pershing succeeded March as Army chief of staff in the permanent grade of general, and served from 1921 to 1924. (Note: The Comptroller General of the United States ruled in 1924 that the offices of "general" (as referred to in the Act of June 4, 1920 [National Defense Act Amendments] (41 Stat. 760) that provided for the peacetime army), "General of the Army of the United States", and "General of the Armies of the United States" were all the same grade held by Grant, Sherman, Sheridan, and now Pershing, who was therefore entitled to the annual pay of $13,500 and other privileges set for Sherman in 1870, including the right to retire at full pay and allowances.) The grade lapsed with his retirement, leaving the rank of major general as the highest available grade in the peacetime Army, and his two-star successors, John L. Hines and Charles P. Summerall, outranked by their four-star Navy counterpart, the chief of naval operations. The temporary rank of general was reauthorized for the chief of staff in 1929, elevating Summerall. (Note: Since the Navy, in fact, had four admirals—the chief of naval operations and the commanders in chief of the United States Fleet, Battle Fleet, and Asiatic Fleet—the Army asked in 1928 to have four generals: the chief of staff and the commanding generals of the Panama Canal Department, Hawaiian Department and Philippine Department. Only the increase in rank for the chief of staff was approved.) In 1940, special legislation advanced Hines to general on the retired list as the only living former chief of staff never to wear four stars.

=== 1941–1991 ===
==== World War II and aftermath ====
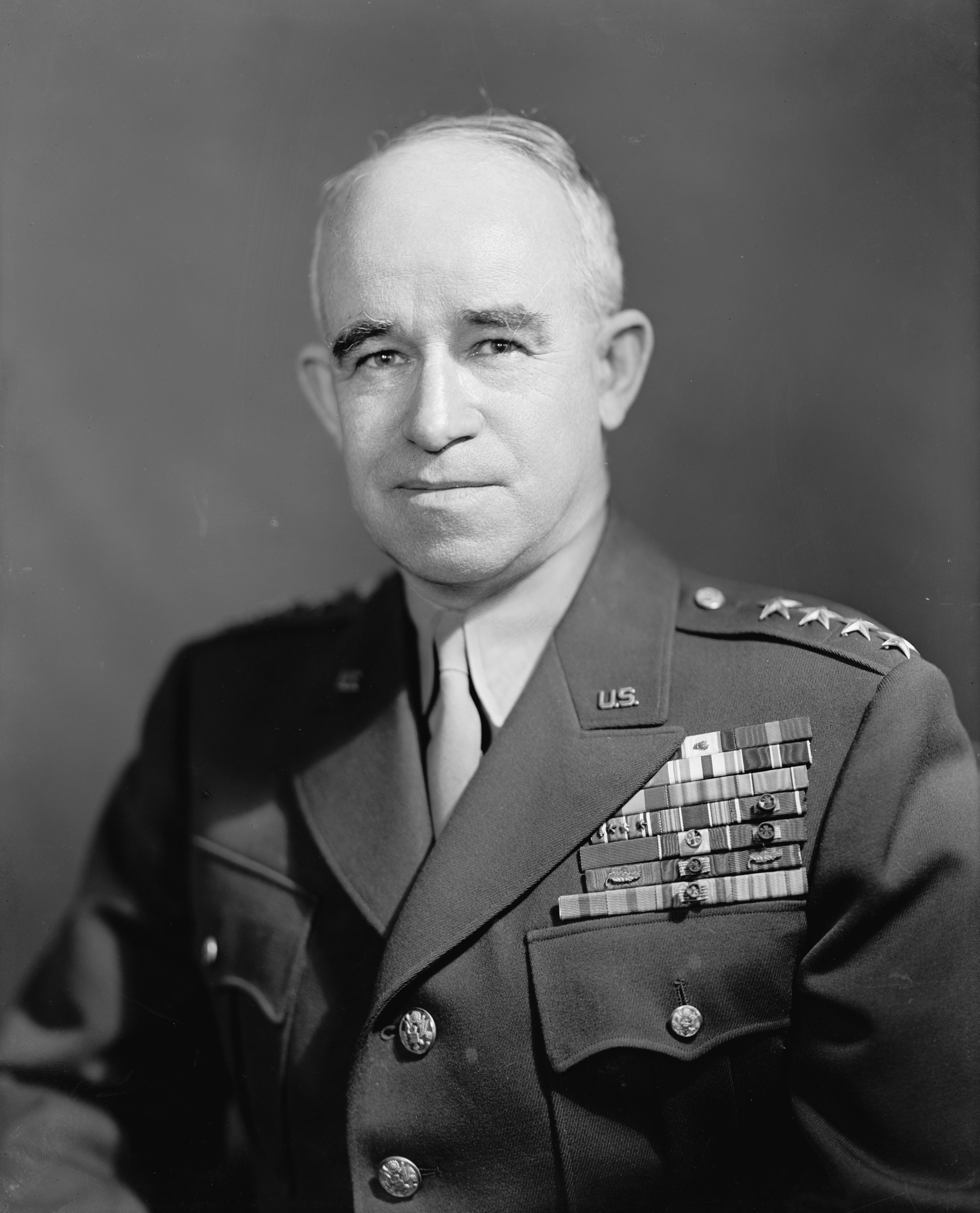
Omar Bradley was made a permanent general in 1948 as a one-time personal honor, with full active-duty pay for life.

The United States entered World War II on 7 December 1941 with one Army general, chief of staff George C. Marshall, authorized. Legislation enacted in 1933 and amended in 1940 allowed the president to appoint officers of the Regular Army, the Army's professional military component, to higher temporary grades in time of war or national emergency. (Note: The relevant provisions were amendments to Section 127(a) of the National Defense Act of 1916. In 1940, the authorization, initially applying only to wartime, was extended to national emergencies.) As with the National Army emergency generals, these appointments expired after the end of the war, although postwar legislation allowed officers to retire in their highest active-duty rank. On 19 December 1941, the Senate confirmed Douglas MacArthur to be the first temporary general in the Army of the United States, the reconstituted draft force, as he fought the Japanese invasion of the Philippines.

Three new Army generals were appointed over the next two years. Dwight D. Eisenhower was appointed temporary general in February 1943, to command Allied forces in North Africa and later Europe; Henry H. Arnold in March 1943, as commanding general of Army Air Forces and member of the Joint Chiefs of Staff; and Joseph W. Stilwell in August 1944, as commander of the China Burma India Theater and chief of staff to Generalissimo Chiang Kai-shek. Marshall, MacArthur, Eisenhower, and Arnold were further promoted to the temporary five-star grade of general of the Army in December 1944, made permanent in March 1946. Malin Craig, Marshall's predecessor as Army chief of staff, was recalled to active duty in his four-star grade to run the War Department's Personnel Board.

More temporary generals were appointed to command postwar occupation forces in Germany and Japan, as well as the stateside Army commands. Omar Bradley, who had commanded the Twelfth Army Group—the bulk of American forces on the Western Front—also received a permanent promotion to general as a one-time personal honor, with full active-duty pay for life. (Note: Procedurally, Bradley's promotion was among a slate of permanent four-star promotions for the Army, Navy, and Air Force, to balance the same promotions granted to the Marine Corps and Coast Guard commandants during World War II, Alexander Vandegrift and Russell R. Waesche.) This was superseded by Bradley's promotion to general of the Army while serving as the first chairman of the Joint Chiefs of Staff, in 1950. By the official termination of the World War II national emergency in April 1952, the Army had eight four-star generals. (Note: The eight four-star Army generals on active duty on 28 April 1952, by seniority within rank, were: Mark W. Clark, chief of Army Field Forces (CAFF); Thomas T. Handy, commander in chief of U.S. Army Europe (dual-hatted as commander of Central Army Group) (CINCUSAREUR/COMCENTAG); J. Lawton Collins, chief of staff of the Army (CSA); Matthew Ridgway, commander in chief of United Nations Command (triple-hatted as commander in chief of Far East Command and military governor of the Ryukyu Islands) (CINCUNC/CINCFE); Walter Bedell Smith, director of central intelligence (DCI); John E. Hull, vice chief of staff of the Army (VCSA); James A. Van Fleet, commanding general of Eighth Army (CG EUSA); and; Alfred Gruenther, chief of staff of Supreme Headquarters Allied Powers Europe (COFS SHAPE).)

==== Cold War ====
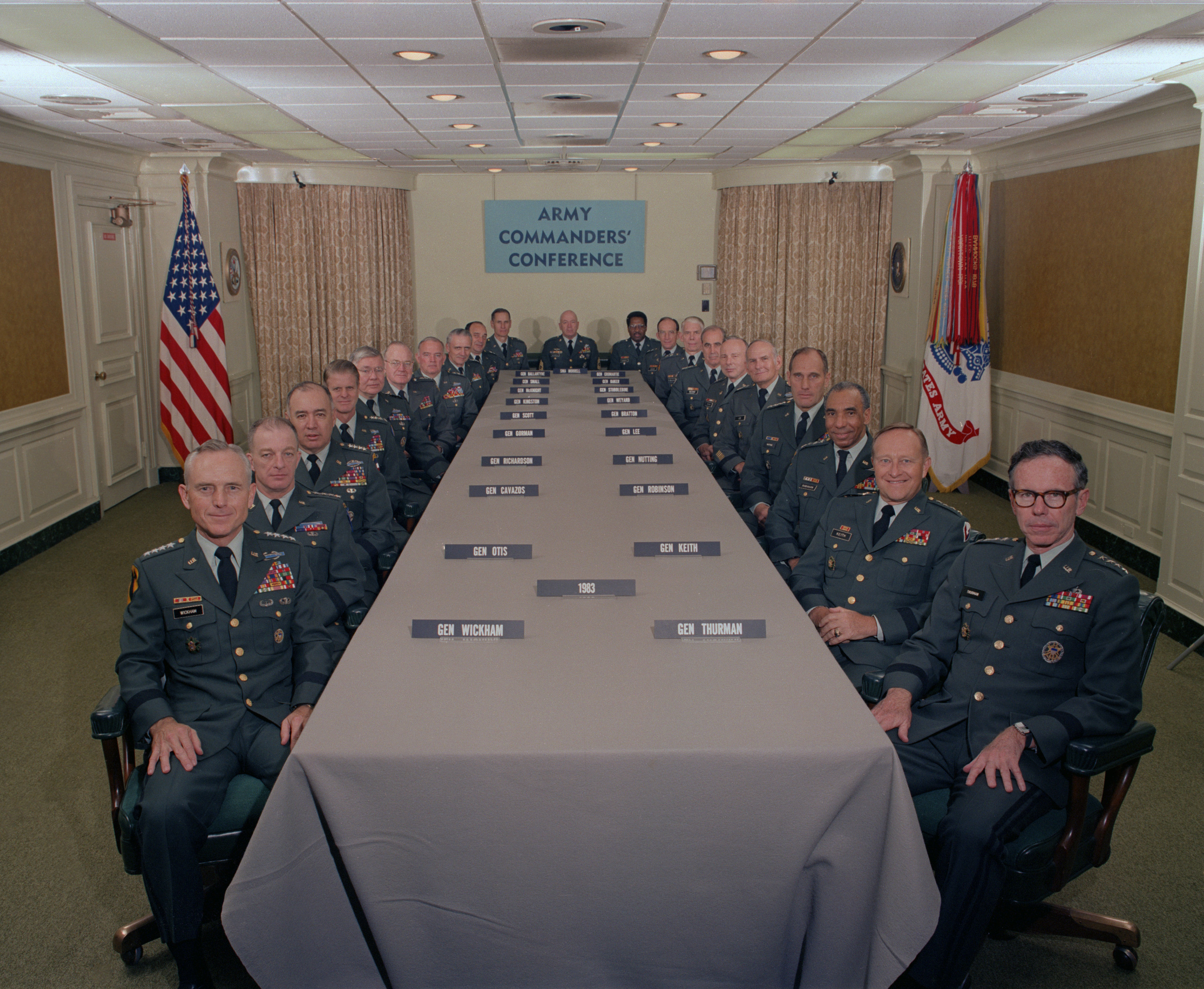
Senior leadership at the Army Commander's Conference, 20 October 1983. Generals Richard E. Cavazos (third from left) and Roscoe Robinson Jr. (third from right) are the first Hispanic and first African-American four-star generals in the Army.

The modern grade of general was established by the Officer Personnel Act (OPA) of 1947, which authorized the president to designate positions of importance and responsibility to carry the grade ex officio, to be filled by officers with the permanent or temporary grade of major general or higher. The total number of positions allowed to carry the grade was capped at 3.75 percent of the total number of general officers on active duty, which worked out initially to five generals for the Army. (Note: These vacancies initially went to the chief of staff, vice chief of staff, and the commanding generals of Army Ground Forces and occupation forces in Germany and Japan.) The four-star grade caps evolved into Section 525 of Title 10 of the United States Code, which was codified in 1956. The chairman of the Joint Chiefs of Staff, the office of which was created in 1949, was exempted from the caps.

Escalating global commitments during the Cold War created more generals, both at home and abroad; a majority were appointed under renewed national emergency authority in excess of grade caps. Besides the JCS chairman and Army chief of staff, the most prestigious Army-dominated positions of the era were the NATO supreme allied commander in Europe (SACEUR); the commander of multinational and U.S. forces in Korea (UNC/FECOM, later USFK); and until 1973, the commander of U.S. forces in Vietnam (USMACV). At the height of the Vietnam War in 1971, the Army had 17 four-star generals.

The Defense Officer Personnel Management Act (DOPMA) of 1980 standardized four-star appointments across all services, replacing the previous service-specific mechanisms. Personal four-star grades held regardless of assignment, once the norm in the post-Civil War era, were abolished under DOPMA. (Note: The final use of such an authority (61 Stat. 907) was from 1953 to 1955 for convenience during the Korean War emergency, but was dropped at the request of the Senate Armed Services Committee.) In 1982, Richard E. Cavazos and Roscoe Robinson Jr. became the first Hispanic and first African-American four-star generals in the Army respectively.

=== 1991–present ===
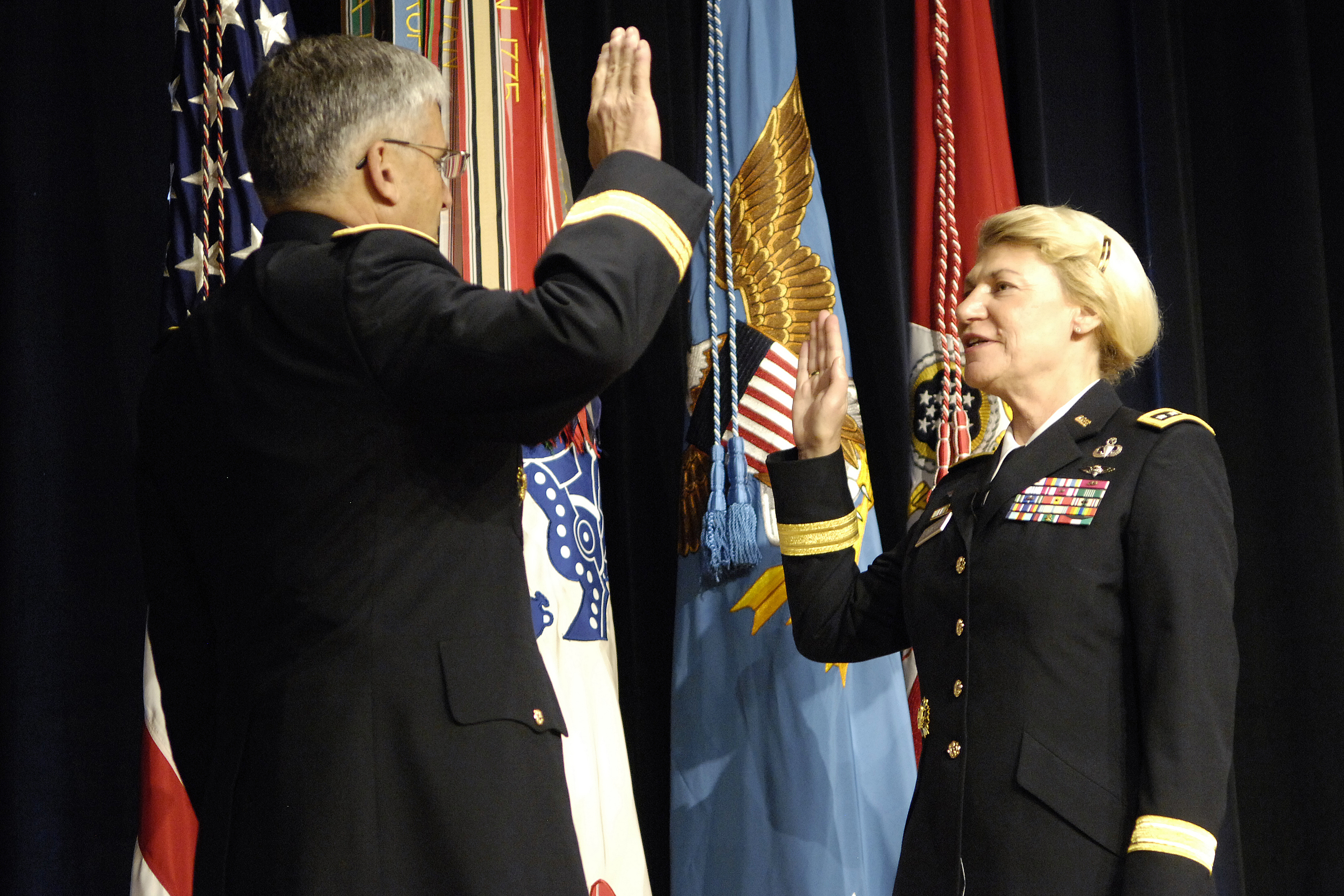
Ann E. Dunwoody (right), the first woman to become a four-star general in the Army, is sworn into her new rank by Army chief of staff George W. Casey Jr. (back facing camera) on 14 November 2008.

The distribution of four-star Army generals remains broadly similar to that of 1947, with a statutory chief and vice chief of staff (CSA, VCSA); stateside commands for readiness, materiel, and training; overseas component commands; and joint duty positions that are exempted from grade caps. Among the latter are the chairman of the Joint Chiefs of Staff (CJCS); the NATO supreme allied commander in Europe (SACEUR); the unified combatant commanders, including the statutory Cyber Command (USCYBERCOM) and Special Operations Command (USSOCOM); the chief of the National Guard Bureau (CNGB); and during the war on terror, the wartime theater commanders in Iraq (MNF-I, later USF-I) and Afghanistan (ISAF, later RSM). In 2002, under defense secretary Donald Rumsfeld, usage of the title "commander in chief" and its acronym "CINC" was reserved for the president and discontinued for military officers, mostly combatant commanders, who were redesignated as "commander".

In 1997, Eric Shinseki became the first Asian-American four-star general in the Army. In 2007, Ann E. Dunwoody became the first woman to achieve the rank of general in the Army, as well as in any armed service. In 2012, Frank J. Grass became the first Army National Guard officer to attain the rank of general, to relieve his Air Force predecessor as CNGB.

In 2009, Congress directly specified the maximum number of four-star officers in each service, replacing the OPA- and DOPMA-era percentage cap formulas. In 2021, the Army was authorized eight four-star generals for positions within the service by the 2021 National Defense Authorization Act: the CSA and VCSA; the commanding generals of Army Forces Command (FORSCOM), Army Training and Doctrine Command (TRADOC), Army Materiel Command (AMC), and Army Futures Command (AFC); and the Army component commanders in Europe/Africa (USAREUR-AF) and the Pacific (USARPAC).

By the end of 2020, the Army had 18 four-star generals on active duty, exceeding the 17 four-star generals it had at the height of the Vietnam War, its previous peak.

== Legislation ==
The following list of Congressional legislation includes major acts of Congress pertaining to appointments to the grade of general in the United States Army.

| Legislation | Citation | Summary |
|---|---|---|
| Act of March 3, 1799 | 1 Stat. 752 | Authorized 1 grade of General of the Armies (intended for George Washington) [repealed in 1802 (2 Stat. 133)]. |
| Act of July 25, 1866 | 14 Stat. 223 | Revived 1 grade of general (Ulysses S. Grant, William T. Sherman) [terminated at next vacancy in 1870 (16 Stat. 318)]. |
| Act of March 1, 1869 | 15 Stat. 281 | Authorized brevet ranks for distinguished conduct and public service in presence of the enemy (Tasker H. Bliss) [repealed in 1956 (70A Stat. 642)]. |
| Act of March 3, 1885 | 23 Stat. 434 | Authorized rank and full pay of general on the retired list for Ulysses S. Grant. |
| Act of June 1, 1888 | 25 Stat. 165 | Authorized 1 appointment to grade of general (Philip H. Sheridan). |
| Act of October 6, 1917 | 40 Stat. 410 | Authorized grade of general during World War I emergency [terminated in 1920 (41 Stat. 760)] (Tasker H. Bliss, Peyton C. March, John J. Pershing). |
| Act of September 3, 1919 | 41 Stat. 283 | Revived grade of General of the Armies for John J. Pershing. |
| Act of February 23, 1929 | 45 Stat. 1255 | Increased rank of chief of staff of the Army to general. |
| Act of June 21, 1930 | 46 Stat. 793 | Authorized promotion on the retired list or posthumously to highest grade held during World War I, with no increase in retired pay (Tasker H. Bliss, Peyton C. March). |
| Act of December 14, 1944 | 58 Stat. 802 | Authorized 4 grades of general of the Army until six months after the end of World War II [made permanent in 1946 (60 Stat. 59)] (George C. Marshall Jr., Douglas MacArthur, Dwight D. Eisenhower, Henry H. Arnold). |
| Act of August 7, 1947 [Officer Personnel Act of 1947] | 61 Stat. 886 | Authorized president to designate, subject to Senate confirmation, Army officers to have the rank of general while assigned to positions of importance and responsibility.; Capped Army positions with ranks above major general at 15 percent of the total number of general officers serving on active federal military duty, of which not more than 25 percent to carry the rank of general. |
| Act of June 26, 1948 | 62 Stat. 1052 | Authorized permanent grade of general and full active-duty pay and allowances in retirement for Omar N. Bradley. |
| Act of September 18, 1950 | 64 Stat. A224 | Authorized permanent grade of general of the Army for Omar N. Bradley. |
| Act of October 11, 1976 | 90 Stat. 2078 | Authorized posthumous promotion of George Washington to General of the Armies. |
| Act of December 12, 1980 [Defense Officer Personnel Management Act] | 94 Stat. 2844; 94 Stat. 2849; 94 Stat. 2876 | Authorized president to designate positions of importance and responsibility to carry the grade of general, to be assigned from officers on active duty in any grade above colonel, subject to Senate confirmation, who revert to their permanent grade at the end of their assignment unless it was terminated by; 1. assignment to another position designated to carry the same grade, 2. up to 180 days of hospitalization, or; 3. up to 90 days prior to retirement [reduced to 60 days in 1991 (105 Stat. 1354)].; Capped, except during war or national emergency, Army officers in grades above major general at 15 percent of all general officers on active duty, of whom not more than 25 percent to serve in the grade of general.; Authorized three- and four-star officers to retire in the highest grade held on active duty, at the discretion of the president and subject to confirmation by the Senate, with no time-in-grade requirement [changed in 1996 to certification by secretary of defense and three-year time-in-grade requirement (110 Stat. 292)]. |
| Act of January 28, 2008 | 122 Stat. 496 | Increased grade of chief of the National Guard Bureau to general. |
| Act of October 28, 2009 | 123 Stat. 2273; 123 Stat. 2274; 123 Stat. 2276 | Capped Army officers in the grade of general at 7, exempting from caps the chief of the National Guard Bureau and up to 20 generals assigned to joint duty [joint-duty cap repealed in 2016, effective December 31, 2022 (130 Stat. 2100); caps changed in 2021 to 8 Army generals and 19 joint-duty generals (134 Stat. 3563)]. |
| Act of December 23, 2022 | 136 Stat. 2611 | Authorized posthumous promotion of Ulysses S. Grant to General of the Armies. |
| Act of December 22, 2023 | 137 Stat. 244 | Increased grade of vice chief of the National Guard Bureau to general. |

== See also ==
- General (United States)
- General officers in the United States
- List of active duty United States four-star officers
- List of lieutenant generals in the United States Army before 1960
- List of United States Army lieutenant generals from 1990 to 1999
- List of United States Army lieutenant generals from 2000 to 2009
- List of United States Army lieutenant generals from 2010 to 2019
- List of United States Army lieutenant generals since 2020
- List of major generals in the United States Regular Army before July 1, 1920
- List of brigadier generals in the United States Regular Army before February 2, 1901
- List of United States Air Force four-star generals
- List of United States Coast Guard four-star admirals
- List of United States Marine Corps four-star generals
- List of United States military leaders by rank
- List of United States Navy four-star admirals
- List of United States Public Health Service Commissioned Corps four-star admirals
- List of United States Space Force four-star generals
- List of British Army full generals
- Staff (military)

== Bibliography ==
=== Books and papers ===
- U.S. Department of the Army (1976) [1948], United States Army Register, Washington, D.C.: U.S. Government Printing Office
- "World Almanac Education Group, Inc.", World Almanac and Book of Facts, New York: World Almanac Education Group, Inc., 2026 [1946]
- Bell, William Gardner (2013). Commanding Generals and Chiefs of Staff, 1775–2013: Portraits and Biographical Sketches of the United States Army's Senior Officer. Washington, D.C.: U.S. Army Center of Military History. ISBN 978-0-16-072376-6.
- Cline, Ray S. (1990) [1951]. "Appendix B: U.S. Army Commanders in Major Theater Commands, December 1941 – September 1945". United States Army in World War II – Washington Command Post: The Operations Division. Washington, D.C.: U.S. Army Center of Military History. ISBN 978-1514870600. CMH Pub 1-2. Archived from the original on 17 April 2021.
- Cosmas, Graham A. (2006). MACV, the Joint Command in the Years of Withdrawal, 1968–1973 (PDF). Washington, D.C.: U.S. Army Center of Military History. ISBN 978-0160771194.
- Ford, Worthington Chauncey, ed. (1905). Journals of the Continental Congress, 1774–1789. Vol. II. Washington, D.C.: U.S. Government Printing Office.
- Heaton, Dean R. (1995). Four Stars: The Super Stars of United States Military History. Baltimore, Maryland: Gateway Press, Inc. ISBN 9780970044709.
- Meyer, Edward C.; Ancell, R. Manning; Mahaffey, Jane (30 March 1995). Who Will Lead? Senior Leadership in the United States Army. Westport: Praeger Publishers. ISBN 978-0275950415.
- Rostker, Bernard; et al. (1993). The Defense Officer Personnel Management Act of 1980: A Retrospective Assessment (PDF). Santa Monica, California: RAND.
- Warner, Ezra J. (1964). Generals in Blue: Lives of the Union Commanders. Louisiana State University Press. ISBN 978-0-80710-822-2.

=== Journals and magazines ===
- "USAF Almanac 2006 The Air Force in Facts and Figures: Structure of the Force" (PDF). Air & Space Forces Magazine. Vol. 89, no. 5. May 2006. Archived (PDF) from the original on 29 May 2024.
- Yoon, Taeyoung (Spring 2005). "The ROK-U.S. Combined Command and Control System and Crisis Management Procedures" (PDF). International Area Review. 8 (1): 149–172. doi:10.1177/223386590500800108. S2CID 167994949.
- "International Area Review" (PDF). International Area Review. 8 (1). 1 March 2005.

=== Online publications ===
- "Department of Defense Key Officials (September 1947 – August 2024)" (PDF). Office of the Secretary of Defense Historical Office. 2024. Archived from the original (PDF) on 15 November 2024.
- Cole, Ronald H.; Poole, Walter S.; Schnabel, James F.; Watson, Robert J.; Webb, Willard J. (1995). "The History of the Unified Command Plan, 1946–1993" (PDF). Washington, D.C.: Office of the Chairman of the Joint Chiefs of Staff. Archived from the original (PDF) on 27 November 2007.
- Leubsdorf, Ben (10 July 2024). "Presidential Medal of Freedom" (PDF). Congressional Research Service. Archived from the original (PDF) on 3 March 2024.
- Straus, Jacob (18 July 2024). "Congressional Gold Medals: Background, Legislative Process, and Issues for Congress" (PDF). Congressional Research Service. Archived from the original (PDF) on 21 September 2024.
- "Senior officials in the NATO military structure, from 1949 to 2001" (PDF). North Atlantic Treaty Organization. Archived from the original (PDF) on 17 February 2009.
- "USAREUR Commanders". U.S. Army Europe. Archived from the original on 28 April 2007.
- "A brief history of U.S. Army Materiel Command and biographies of AMC's commanding generals". U.S. Army Materiel Command Historical Office. Archived from the original on 21 September 2003.
