= List of governors of the Nanpō Islands =

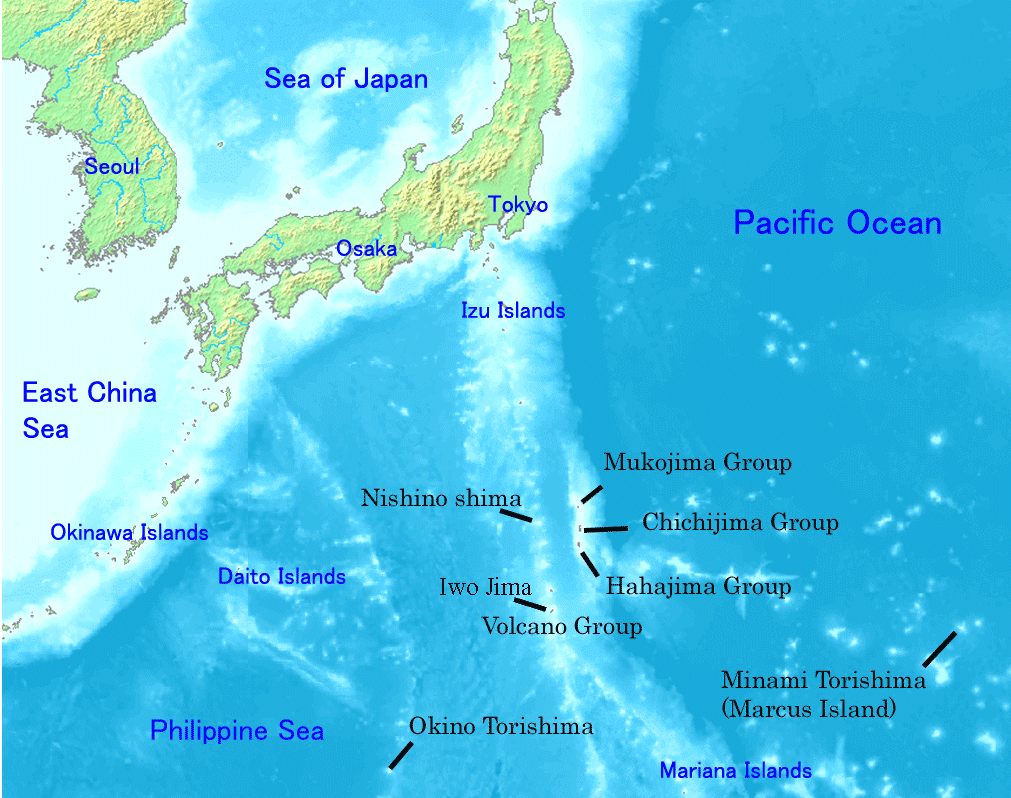
Location of the Nanpō Islands (black) in the Pacific Ocean.

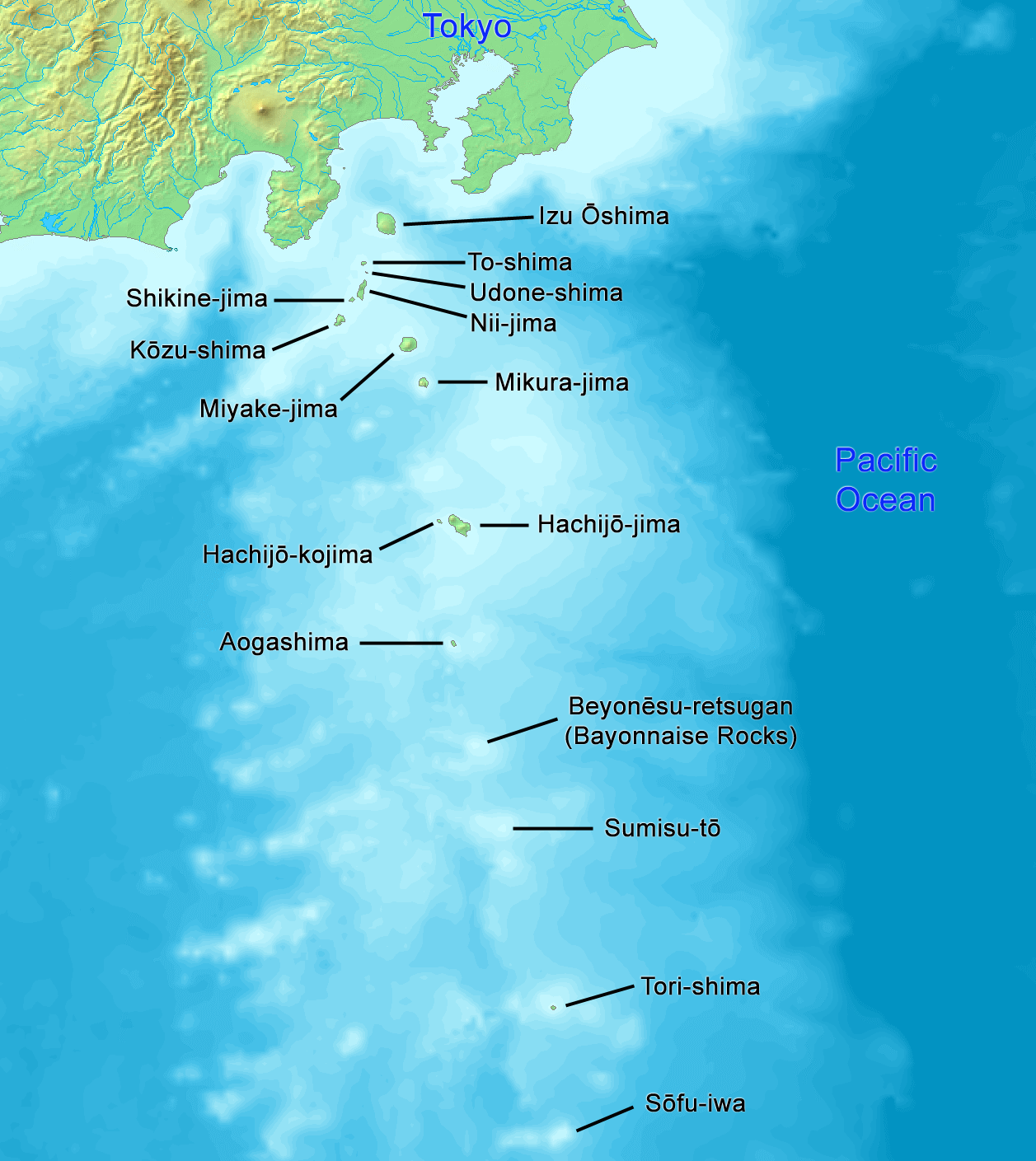
Detailed map of the Izu Islands (black).

This article lists the governors of the Nanpō Islands (南方諸島, Nanpō-shotō), a collective name for the groups of Japanese islands within Tokyo Metropolis, consisting of the Izu Islands, the Bonin Islands and the Volcano Islands. The islands are located to the south of the Japanese home islands.

The list encompasses the period from the founding of the first permanent settlement of Westerners on Chichijima (one of the Bonin Islands) in 1830 (under the auspices of the British, which claimed the islands in 1827), until the return of the islands to Japanese sovereignty in 1968 (following the U.S. occupation after World War II).

== Officeholders ==
† denotes people who died in office.

=== Westerners' settlement (1830–1862, 1863–1874) ===
==== Chief Islanders ====
- 1830–1848: Matteo (Matthew) Mazarro†
- 1848–1862, 1863 – 10 April 1874: Nathaniel Savory† (acting to 1853; magistrate 1853–1859)

=== Japanese suzerainty (1862–1863, 1876–1945) ===
==== Governors ====
- 18 January 1862 – 7 April 1862: Mizuno Chikugo no Kami Tadanori
- August 1862 – May 1863: Sakunosuke (Sakusuke) Obana

==== Chief Commissioner ====
- December 1876 – November 1880: Sakunosuke (Sakusuke) Obana

==== Commanders, Ogasawara Corps ====
| No. | Portrait | Commander | Took office | Left office | Time in office | Defence branch |
|---|---|---|---|---|---|---|
| 1 | Tadamichi Kuribayashi栗林 忠道 | General; Tadamichi Kuribayashi 栗林 忠道 (1891–1945) (Note: Commander of the 109th Division; killed in action in the Battle of Iwo Jima.) | 27 May 1944 | c. 26 March 1945 † | 303 days | Imperial Japanese Army |
| 2 | Yoshio Tachibana立花 芳夫 | Lieutenant general Yoshio Tachibana 立花 芳夫 (1890–1947) (Note: Commander of the 1st Independent Mixed Brigade, 109th Division; assumed the command of the 109th Division upon the death of Kuribayashi.) | c. 26 March 1945 | 13 December 1945 | 262 days | Imperial Japanese Army |

=== U.S. occupation (1945–1968) ===
==== Military Governors, Bonin, Volcano and Marcus Islands (in Tokyo) ====
- 1 January 1947 – 9 April 1951: the Commanders-in-Chief, Far East Command

==== Military Governors, Bonin Islands (in Pearl Harbor) ====
- 9 April 1951 – 26 July 1968: the Commanders-in-Chief, U.S. Pacific Fleet

==== Deputy Military Governors, Bonin – Volcano Islands (on the Marianas; Saipan, then Guam) ====
(the Commanders Naval Forces Marianas [to 1956 Commanders Marianas Area])

- August 1945 – 1946: George D. Murray
- 1946 – August 1949: Charles Alan Pownall
- August 1949 – 1950: Edward Coyle Ewen
- 1950 – 1951: Osborne Bennett Hardison
- July 1951 – 1954: Ernest Wheeler Litch Jr.
- February 1954 – 27 October 1955: Marion Emerson Murphy
- 13 February 1956 – 1957: William Bronley Ammon
- 1957 – 1960: William L. Erdmann
- 17 January 1960 – 1961: Waldemar F. A. Wendt
- September 1961 – January 1963: John Starr Coye Jr.
- January 1963 – 1964: Thomas Aloysius Christopher
- 1964 – 1966: Horace Virgil Bird
- 1966 – 25 June 1968: Carlton Benton Jones

==== Officers-in-Charge, Bonin Islands ====
- 6 October 1945 – 8 October 1946: Presley Morehead Rixey (Commander of Bonin Occupation Force)
- 8 October 1946 – June 1947: Vernon Bertram Hagenbuckle
- June 1947 – April 1951: ....

==== Military Government Representatives, Bonin – Volcano Islands ====
(Officers-in-Charge, U.S. Naval Facility Chichi Jima, Bonin Islands)

- April 1951 – June 1952: Frederick Alfred Pobst
- June 1952 – 21 July 1953: John Walter Kelsey Jr.
- 21 July 1953 – October 1955: Clayton Ernest "Jack" Frost
- October 1955 – March 1958: Earl Dean Bronson
- May 1958 – June 1960: Thomas Gordon Rice
- July 1960 – June 1963: Vernon Ward Weatherby
- July 1963 – January 1964: John Robert Thorndyke
- February 1964 – July 1964: Ronald Lee Farrar
- July 1964 – December 1965: James Hamilton Reynolds
- December 1965 – 25 June 1968: Dale Wayne Johnson

== See also ==
- United States Military Government of the Ryukyu Islands
- United States Civil Administration of the Ryukyu Islands
  - List of U.S. governors of the Ryukyu Islands
