= List of U.S. governors of the Ryukyu Islands =

U.S. governor of the Ryukyu Islands
- 琉球列島のアメリカ知事 (Ryūkyū-rettō no Amerika chiji)
- Seal of High Commissioner of the Ryukyu Islands

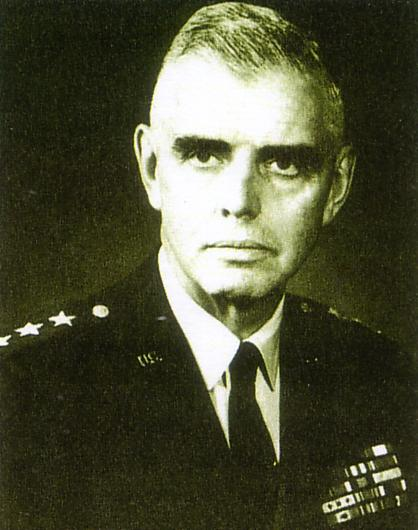
- Longest serving LTG James Benjamin Lampert; 28 January 1968 – 14 May 1972
- United States Department of War; United States Department of Defense
- Type: Military governor
- Status: Senior-most officer of military occupation
- Member of: USMGR (1945–1950); USCAR (1950–1972)
- Seat: Naha, Okinawa
- Term length: No fixed term
- Constituting instrument: Treaty of San Francisco (Formal establishment) (Note: Article 3 of the Treaty of San Francisco: "Japan will concur in any proposal of the United States to the United Nations to place under its trusteeship system, with the United States as the sole administering authority, Nansei Shoto south of 29° north latitude (including the Ryukyu Islands and the Daitō Islands), Nanpo Shoto south of Sofu Gan (including the Bonin Islands, Rosario Island and the Volcano Islands) and Parece Vela and Marcus Island. Pending the making of such a proposal and affirmative action thereon, the United States will have the right to exercise all and any powers of administration, legislation, and jurisdiction over the territory and inhabitants of these islands, including their territorial waters.")
- Precursor: Governor of Okinawa Prefecture
- Formation: 1 April 1945; 81 years ago
- First holder: LTG Simon Bolivar Buckner Jr.
- Final holder: LTG James Benjamin Lampert
- Abolished: 14 May 1972; 54 years ago
- Succession: Governor of Okinawa Prefecture

This article lists the U.S. governors of the Ryukyu Islands (Japanese: 琉球諸島, Hepburn: Ryūkyū-shotō; Okinawan: 琉球/ルーチュー Ruuchuu), an archipelago of Japanese islands within Kagoshima and Okinawa prefectures, centered on the Okinawa Islands and its main island, Okinawa (the smallest and least populated of the five Japanese home islands).

The list encompasses the period of U.S. occupation, from the start of the Battle of Okinawa in 1945 until the return of the islands to Japanese sovereignty in 1972, in accordance with the 1971 Okinawa Reversion Agreement.

== Officeholders ==
† denotes people who died in office.

=== United States Military Government of the Ryukyu Islands (USMGR, 1945–1950) ===
==== Military Governors ====
No.	Portrait	Governor	Took office	Left office	Time in office	Defence branch
1	Simon Bolivar Buckner Jr.	Lieutenant general Simon Bolivar Buckner Jr. (1886–1945) (Note: Commander of the Tenth Army; killed in action in the Battle of Okinawa.)	1 April 1945	18 June 1945 †	78 days	United States Army
–	Roy Geiger	Major general Roy Geiger (1885–1947); Acting (Note: Commander of the III Amphibious Corps; assumed the command of the Tenth Army upon the death of Buckner.)	18 June 1945	23 June 1945	5 days	United States Marine Corps
–	Joseph Stilwell	General; Joseph Stilwell (1883–1946); Acting (Note: Commander of the Tenth Army.)	23 June 1945	31 July 1945	38 days	United States Army
2	Joseph Stilwell	General; Joseph Stilwell (1883–1946)	31 July 1945	16 October 1945	77 days	United States Army
N/A	Fred Clute Wallace	Major general Fred Clute Wallace (1887–1959); Commanding General, Island Command Okinawa	June 1945	23 April 1946	10 months	United States Army
3	Lawrence A. Lawson	Brigadier general Lawrence A. Lawson (1897–1951)	17 October 1945	29 December 1945	73 days	United States Army
4	Fremont Byron Hodson Sr.	Brigadier general Fremont Byron Hodson Sr. (1894–1974)	30 December 1945	26 February 1946	58 days	United States Army
5	Leo Donovan	Major general Leo Donovan (1895–1950)	27 February 1946	21 May 1946	83 days	United States Army
6	Frederic L. Hayden	Brigadier general Frederic L. Hayden (1901–1969)	24 May 1946	11 May 1948	1 year, 353 days	United States Army
7	William W. Eagles	Major general William W. Eagles (1895–1988)	12 May 1948	30 September 1949	1 year, 141 days	United States Army
8	Josef R. Sheetz	Major general Josef R. Sheetz (1895–1992)	1 October 1949	21 July 1950	293 days	United States Army
9	Robert B. McClure	Major general Robert B. McClure (1896–1973)	28 July 1950	6 December 1950	131 days	United States Army
–	Harry B. Sherman	Brigadier general Harry B. Sherman (1894–1974); Acting	6 December 1950	9 December 1950	3 days	United States Army
10	Robert S. Beightler	Major general Robert S. Beightler (1892–1978)	9 December 1950	15 December 1950	6 days	United States Army

=== United States Civil Administration of the Ryukyu Islands (USCAR, 1950–1972) ===
==== Governors and Commanders-in-Chief, Far East Command (in Tokyo) ====
No.	Portrait	Governor	Took office	Left office	Time in office	Defence branch
1	Douglas MacArthur	General; Douglas MacArthur (1880–1964) (Note: Simultaneously served as SCAP.)	15 December 1950	11 April 1951 (Note: Relieved of command by President Harry S. Truman.)	117 days	United States Army
2	Matthew Ridgway	General; Matthew Ridgway (1895–1993)	11 April 1951	12 May 1952	1 year, 31 days	United States Army
3	Mark W. Clark	General; Mark W. Clark (1896–1984)	12 May 1952	7 October 1953	1 year, 148 days	United States Army
4	John E. Hull	General; John E. Hull (1895–1975)	7 October 1953	1 April 1955	1 year, 176 days	United States Army
5	Maxwell D. Taylor	General; Maxwell D. Taylor (1901–1987)	1 April 1955	5 June 1955	65 days	United States Army
6	Lyman Lemnitzer	General; Lyman Lemnitzer (1899–1988)	5 June 1955	30 June 1957	2 years, 25 days	United States Army

==== Deputy governors and Commanding Generals, Ryukyu Islands Command (in Naha) ====
No.	Portrait	Deputy Governor	Took office	Left office	Time in office	Defence branch
1	Robert S. Beightler	Major general Robert S. Beightler (1892–1978)	15 December 1950	10 May 1951	146 days	United States Army
–	Harry B. Sherman	Brigadier general Harry B. Sherman (1894–1974); Acting	10 May 1951	7 August 1951	89 days	United States Army
(1)	Robert S. Beightler	Major general Robert S. Beightler (1892–1978)	8 August 1951	16 December 1952	1 year, 130 days	United States Army
2	James Malcolm Lewis	Brigadier general James Malcolm Lewis (1898–1954)	18 December 1952	2 January 1953	15 days	United States Army
3	David Ayres Depue Ogden	Lieutenant general David Ayres Depue Ogden (1897–1969)	3 January 1953	4 March 1955	2 years, 60 days	United States Army
4	James Edward Moore	Lieutenant general James Edward Moore (1902–1986)	5 March 1955	3 July 1957	2 years, 120 days	United States Army

==== High Commissioners ====
No.	Portrait	High Commissioner	Took office	Left office	Time in office	Defence branch
1	James Edward Moore	Lieutenant general James Edward Moore (1902–1986)	4 July 1957	30 April 1958	300 days	United States Army
2	Donald Prentice Booth	Lieutenant general Donald Prentice Booth (1902–1993)	1 May 1958	12 February 1961	2 years, 287 days	United States Army
3	Paul Caraway	Lieutenant general Paul Caraway (1905–1985)	16 February 1961	31 July 1964	3 years, 166 days	United States Army
4	Albert Watson II	Lieutenant general Albert Watson II (1909–1993)	1 August 1964	31 October 1966	2 years, 91 days	United States Army
5	Ferdinand Thomas Unger	Lieutenant general Ferdinand Thomas Unger (1914–1999)	2 November 1966	28 January 1968	1 year, 87 days	United States Army
6	James Benjamin Lampert	Lieutenant general James Benjamin Lampert (1914–1978)	28 January 1968	14 May 1972	4 years, 107 days	United States Army

==== Civil Administrators ====
No.	Portrait	Civil Administrator	Took office	Left office	Time in office
1	Vonna F. Burger	Vonna F. Burger (1902–1999)	June 1955	20 June 1959	4 years
2	John G. Ondrick	John G. Ondrick (1906–1974)	1 July 1959	May 1962	2 years, 10 months
3	Shannon Boyd-Bailey McCune	Shannon Boyd-Bailey McCune (1913–1993)	18 July 1962	8 February 1964	1 year, 205 days
4	Gerald Warner	Gerald Warner (1907–1989)	11 February 1964	10 July 1967	3 years, 149 days
5	Stanley Sherman Carpenter	Stanley Sherman Carpenter (1917–1982)	15 July 1967	15 August 1969	2 years, 31 days
6	Robert A. Fearey	Robert A. Fearey (1918–2004)	21 August 1969	12 May 1972	2 years, 265 days

== See also ==
- History of the Ryukyu Islands
- Government of the Ryukyu Islands, the body of Okinawan self-governance from 1952–1972.
- List of governors of the Nanpō Islands
