= ROK/US Combined Forces Command =

Joint South Korea-US military command

- 한미연합군사령부
- Active: 7 November 1978 – present (48 years)
- Country: South Korea; United States of America
- Allegiance: South Korea; United States of America
- Engagements: Korean Conflict 1978-Present
- Website: www.usfk.mil

Commanders
- Commander: GEN Xavier Brunson, USA
- Deputy Commander: GEN Kim Sungmin, ROKA
- Chief Of Staff: LTG Joseph Hilbert, USA
- Deputy Chief Of Staff: MG Kang In-kyu, ROKA
- Command Sergeant Major: CSM Jack H. Love, USA

ROK/US Combined Forces Command (CFC) is a joint warfighting headquarters comprising the Republic of Korea Armed Forces and United States Forces Korea. It was established in 1978. During wartime it would serve as the operational command headquarters for all of the South Korean and U.S. ground, air, sea (including Marine) and special operations forces fighting on the Korean peninsula. Since November 2022 CFC has been headquartered at Camp Humphreys, in Pyeongtaek, Korea. Previously it was headquartered at Yongsan Garrison in Seoul.

The CFC is commanded by a four-star U.S. Army general, with a four-star ROK Army general as deputy commander. This pattern exists throughout the CFC command structure: if the chief of a staff section is Korean, the deputy is American and vice versa.

The American general also serves, concurrently, as the Commander of United Nations Command and Commanding General, U.S. Forces Korea.

CFC's mission is to "Deter hostile acts of external aggression against the Republic of Korea by a combined military effort of the United States of America and the ROK; and in the event deterrence fails, defeat an external armed attack against the ROK." To accomplish this mission the CFC has operational control over more than 600,000 active-duty military personnel of all services, of both countries. In wartime this would expand to include some 3.5 million ROK reservists as well as additional U.S. forces deployed from outside the ROK.

Despite the impression of total American control of the Republic of Korea's armed forces via the CFC, during peacetime the Korean units are wholly independent since 1994 already. Only during wartime would the Korean military come under the operational command of the CFC.

== Commander ==
No.	Commander		Term			Service branch
No.	Portrait	Name	Took office	Left office	Term length	Service branch
1	John W. Vessey Jr.	General; John W. Vessey Jr. (1922–2016)	7 November 1978	10 July 1979	245 days	U.S. Army
2	John A. Wickham Jr.	General; John A. Wickham Jr. (1928–2024)	10 July 1979	4 June 1982	2 years, 329 days	U.S. Army
3	Robert W. Sennewald	General; Robert W. Sennewald (1929–2023)	4 June 1982	1 June 1984	1 year, 363 days	U.S. Army
4	William J. Livsey	General; William J. Livsey (1931–2016)	1 June 1984	25 June 1987	3 years, 24 days	U.S. Army
5	Louis C. Menetrey Jr.	General; Louis C. Menetrey Jr. (1929–2009)	25 June 1987	26 June 1990	3 years, 1 day	U.S. Army
6	Robert W. RisCassi	General; Robert W. RisCassi (born 1936)	26 June 1990	15 June 1993	2 years, 354 days	U.S. Army
7	Gary E. Luck	General; Gary E. Luck (1937–2024)	15 June 1993	9 July 1996	3 years, 24 days	U.S. Army
8	John H. Tilelli Jr.	General; John H. Tilelli Jr. (born 1941)	9 July 1996	9 December 1999	3 years, 153 days	U.S. Army
9	Thomas A. Schwartz	General; Thomas A. Schwartz (born 1945)	9 December 1999	1 May 2002	2 years, 143 days	U.S. Army
10	Leon J. LaPorte	General; Leon J. LaPorte (born 1946)	1 May 2002	3 February 2006	3 years, 278 days	U.S. Army
11	B.B. Bell	General; B.B. Bell (born 1947)	3 February 2006	3 June 2008	2 years, 121 days	U.S. Army
12	Walter L. Sharp	General; Walter L. Sharp (born 1952)	3 June 2008	14 July 2011	3 years, 41 days	U.S. Army
13	James D. Thurman	General; James D. Thurman (born 1953)	14 July 2011	12 October 2013	2 years, 80 days	U.S. Army
14	Curtis M. Scaparrotti	General; Curtis M. Scaparrotti (born 1956)	2 October 2013	30 April 2016	2 years, 211 days	U.S. Army
15	Vincent K. Brooks	General; Vincent K. Brooks (born 1958)	30 April 2016	8 November 2018	2 years, 192 days	U.S. Army
16	Robert B. Abrams	General; Robert B. Abrams (born 1960)	8 November 2018	2 July 2021	2 years, 236 days	U.S. Army
17	Paul LaCamera	General; Paul LaCamera (born 1963)	2 July 2021	20 December 2024	3 years, 171 days	U.S. Army
18	Xavier Brunson	General; Xavier Brunson (born c. 1965)	20 December 2024	Incumbent	1 year, 324 days	U.S. Army

== Deputy Commander ==
No.	Deputy Commander		Term			Service branch
No.	Portrait	Name	Took office	Left office	Term length	Service branch
1	Lew Byong-hyun	General; Lew Byong-hyun (1924–2020)	7 November 1978	18 December 1979	1 year, 41 days	R.O.K. Army
2	Baek Seok-ju	General; Baek Seok-ju (1923–2017)	21 December 1979	28 August 1981	1 year, 250 days	R.O.K. Army
3	Park No-yeong	General; Park No-yeong (1930–2012)	8 September 1981	30 August 1983	1 year, 356 days	R.O.K. Army
4	Lee Sang-hoon	General; Lee Sang-hoon (born 1933)	30 August 1983	1 September 1985	2 years, 1 day	R.O.K. Army
5	Han Chul-soo	General; Han Chul-soo (born 1935)	1 September 1985	30 August 1987	1 year, 363 days	R.O.K. Army
6	Jung Jin-tae	General; Jung Jin-tae (born 1934)	30 August 1987	6 April 1989	1 year, 219 days	R.O.K. Army
7	Na Joong-bae	General; Na Joong-bae (1936–2018)	6 April 1989	27 December 1990	1 year, 265 days	R.O.K. Army
8	Kim Jin-young	General; Kim Jin-young (born 1938)	27 December 1990	3 December 1991	341 days	R.O.K. Army
9	Kim Dong-jin	General; Kim Dong-jin (born 1938)	3 December 1991	9 March 1993	1 year, 96 days	R.O.K. Army
10	Kim Jae-chang	General; Kim Jae-chang (born 1940)	31 March 1993	19 April 1994	1 year, 41 days	R.O.K. Army
11	Chang Sung	General; Chang Sung (born 1939)	19 April 1994	21 October 1996	2 years, 185 days	R.O.K. Army
12	Kim Dong-shin	General; Kim Dong-shin (born 1941)	21 October 1996	28 March 1998	1 year, 158 days	R.O.K. Army
13	Jung Yeong-moo	General; Jung Yeong-moo (born 1943)	28 March 1998	28 April 2000	2 years, 31 days	R.O.K. Army
14	Lee Jong-ok	General; Lee Jong-ok (born 1944)	28 April 2000	10 April 2002	1 year, 347 days	R.O.K. Army
15	Nam Jae-jun	General; Nam Jae-jun (born 1944)	10 April 2002	4 April 2003	359 days	R.O.K. Army
16	Shin Il-soon	General; Shin Il-soon (born 1948)	4 April 2003	2 June 2004	1 year, 59 days	R.O.K. Army
17	Kim Jang-soo	General; Kim Jang-soo (born 1948)	2 June 2004	31 March 2005	302 days	R.O.K. Army
18	Lee Hee-won	General; Lee Hee-won (1948–2018)	31 March 2005	21 November 2006	1 year, 235 days	R.O.K. Army
19	Kim Byung-kwan	General; Kim Byung-kwan (born 1948)	21 November 2006	28 March 2008	1 year, 128 days	R.O.K. Army
20	Lee Sung-chool	General; Lee Sung-chool (born 1949)	28 March 2008	21 September 2009	1 year, 177 days	R.O.K. Army
21	Hwang Ui-don	General; Hwang Ui-don (born 1953)	21 September 2009	24 June 2010	276 days	R.O.K. Army
22	Jeong Seung-jo	General; Jeong Seung-jo (born 1953)	24 June 2010	24 October 2011	1 year, 122 days	R.O.K. Army
23	Kwon Oh-sung	General; Kwon Oh-sung (born 1955)	24 October 2011	27 September 2013	1 year, 338 days	R.O.K. Army
24	Park Sun-woo	General; Park Sun-woo (born 1957)	27 September 2013	17 September 2015	1 year, 355 days	R.O.K. Army
25	Kim Hyun-jip	General; Kim Hyun-jip (born 1957)	17 September 2015	22 September 2016	1 year, 5 days	R.O.K. Army
26	Leem Ho-young	General; Leem Ho-young (born 1959)	22 September 2016	11 August 2017	323 days	R.O.K. Army
27	Kim Byung-joo	General; Kim Byung-joo (born 1962)	11 August 2017	17 April 2019	1 year, 249 days	R.O.K. Army
28	Choi Byung-hyuk	General; Choi Byung-hyuk (born 1963)	17 April 2019	23 September 2020	1 year, 159 days	R.O.K. Army
29	Kim Seung-kyum	General; Kim Seung-kyum (born 1963)	23 September 2020	27 May 2022	1 year, 246 days	R.O.K. Army
30	Ahn Byung-suk	General; Ahn Byung-suk (born 1967)	27 May 2022	31 October 2023	1 year, 157 days	R.O.K. Army
31	Kang Shin-chul	General; Kang Shin-chul (born 1968)	31 October 2023	3 September 2025	3 years, 9 days	R.O.K. Army
32	Kim Sung-Min	General; Kim Sung-Min (born 1969)	3 September 2025	Incumbent	1 year, 67 days	R.O.K. Army

== See also ==
- United Nations Command
- Combined Forces Command-Afghanistan 2001–7
