= OPLAN 5029 =

US–South Korea plan, North Korea collapse

- Part of Korean conflict
- Location: Korean peninsula
- Planned: 1999–present
- Planned by: ROK-US Combined Forces Command
- Objective: US/ROK plan for a sudden collapse of the North Korean regime

OPLAN 5029 is a proposed military operation plan by the United States and South Korea for dealing with "sudden change" in North Korea, such as a coup d'état, revolution, large scale defections, outflow of weapons of mass destruction, hostage situations involving South Koreans, or major natural disasters. While no permanent version of OPLAN 5029 is known to be in effect, South Korea has repeatedly stated it adheres to the current conceptual plan (CONPLAN 5029) and the United States has said it is preparing concrete plans for collapse scenarios.

== History ==
In August 1999, General John H. Tilelli, Jr., commander of United States Forces Korea, acknowledged the existence of a scenario and plan by ROK-US Combined Forces Command involving the collapse of North Korea, stating "it would be unusual if we didn't have one".

In early 2005, the South Korean National Security Council vetoed an American proposal to upgrade CONPLAN 5029's general course of action to the specific military plans of an operational plan, where the United States would have command over South Korean military assets in the event of a North Korean collapse. South Korean officials feared the plan might limit "South Korea's exercise of its sovereignty", though American officials argued it would be necessary for securing sensitive nuclear and military facilities as well as protecting the general public. In June 2005, South Korean Defense Minister Yoon Kwang-ung and US Secretary of Defense Donald Rumsfeld agreed to further "improve and develop" the concept plan.

Throughout late 2008, in response to rumors of North Korean leader Kim Jong-il being in poor health, references were made to response plans. Discussions in October between US Secretary of Defense Robert M. Gates and South Korean Minister of National Defense Lee Sang-hee over the planned transition of wartime operations to South Korean forces also included continued formulation of an operation plan for a North Korean collapse, after a proposal made in an earlier meeting between the American and South Korean Joint Chiefs of Staff. In a speech to the Korea Retired Generals and Admirals Association, U.S. Forces Korea Commander General Walter L. Sharp announced that response plans to a variety of situations involving North Korea, including instability and regime change, had been prepared. The DPRK's Korean Central News Agency responded by claiming that "the U.S. and the South Korean war-like forces [had] openly held an anti-DPRK military confab at which they agreed to 'rapidly dispatch reinforcements in contingency'" and claimed "U.S. belligerent forces would be well advised not to misjudge the army of Songun and the will of the DPRK but stop their reckless moves for a new war."

== Scenarios ==
A great deal of speculation exists on the outcome of a North Korean collapse, owing to the lack of a detailed operational plan, the circumstances that would lead to an intervention in North Korea, and the choices available to a wide range of actors.

Many have speculated on the importance of securing North Korea's nuclear weapons program to prevent their use against South Korea or being used towards nuclear terrorism. South Korean and American officials have stated that American forces would most likely take the lead on securing nuclear material, before and after the planned transfer of wartime operations, though South Korean troops would also be able to aid in matters of nuclear, chemical, and biological materials.

=== Chinese plans ===
With the closeness of relations between North Korea and the People's Republic of China, the Chinese government has refused to discuss the existence or details of any contingency plans for unrest in North Korea. Great speculation exists over the nature or intent of any potential Chinese intervention.

One report written by the United States Institute of Peace and the Center for Strategic and International Studies suggested a strong preference for authorization and coordination under a UN mandate, but a willingness to act unilaterally in restoring order to the event of a sudden collapse (including the deployment of soldiers and other personnel for humanitarian, peacekeeping, and nonproliferation purposes). Some Chinese specialists interviewed were concerned that the United States and North Korea may strike a compromise deal in which Pyongyang is allowed to keep its nuclear weapons, leaving Beijing isolated in its insistence on a denuclearized Korea, in a similar manner as happened with India's nuclear program.

In the trial of former South Korean spy Park Chae-seo, Park claimed knowledge of a contingency plan named "the Chick Plan" from a director-level Chinese intelligence official (its name referring to a large mothering hen protecting the small eggs beneath her). The claimed plan included a line of demarcation between the towns of Nampho and Wonsan, along the Daedong River, where Chinese forces could form a zone of occupation in which to restore order, prevent refugees from entering China, and form a buffer zone against South Korean and American forces. Park also claimed that no Chinese investment in North Korea had been allowed past this line and that PLA soldiers had been stationed in Shenyang, with operational roads built over the Yalu and Tumen Rivers at the cost of KRW2.5 trillion.

== See also ==
- OPLAN 5027
- Korean reunification
