= United States Forces Korea =

American military forces stationed in South Korea

- 주한 미군
- USFK emblem
- Founded: 1 July 1957
- Country: United States
- Type: Subordinate unified command
- Size: ~28,000
- Part of: U.S. Indo-Pacific Command
- Headquarters: Camp Humphreys, Pyeongtaek, South Korea
- Nickname: USFK
- Website: usfk.mil

Commanders
- Commander: GEN Xavier Brunson, USA
- Deputy Commander: Lt Gen David R. Iverson, USAF
- Command Sergeant Major: CSM Robin M. Bolmer, USA
- Notable commanders: GEN Vincent K. Brooks, USA; GEN George Decker, USA; GEN Hamilton H. Howze, USA; GEN John W. Vessey Jr., USA; GEN John A. Wickham Jr., USA

Insignia
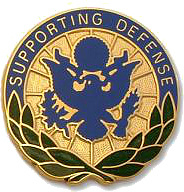
- Distinctive unit insignia

- Flag

- United States Forces Korea
- Hangul: 주한미군
- Hanja: 駐韓美軍
- Revised Romanization: Juhanmigun
- McCune–Reischauer: Chuhanmigun

The United States Forces Korea (USFK) is a subordinate unified command of U.S. Indo-Pacific Command (USINDOPACOM). USFK was initially established in 1957, and encompasses U.S. combat-ready fighting forces and components under the ROK/US Combined Forces Command (CFC) – a supreme command for all of the South Korean and U.S. ground, air, sea, and special operations component commands. Major USFK elements include U.S. Eighth Army (EUSA), U.S. Air Forces Korea (Seventh Air Force), U.S. Naval Forces Korea (CNFK), U.S. Marine Forces Korea (MARFORK), and U.S. Special Operations Command Korea (SOCKOR).

The mission of USFK is to support the United Nations Command (UNC) and Combined Forces Command by coordinating and planning among U.S. component commands, and exercise operational control of U.S. forces as directed by United States Indo-Pacific Command. In addition, USFK is responsible for organizing, training and equipping U.S. forces on the Korean Peninsula, as well as executing ancillary functions such as non-combatant evacuation operations.

The U.S. military presence in South Korea is extensive, including at least 24,234 active-duty soldiers, sailors, airmen, and marines as well as nine major bases.

== Components ==
- Eighth United States Army;
  Headquarters: Camp Humphreys, South Korea; authorized about 20,000 Soldiers
  - USAG Daegu
    - Camp Henry – Daegu city (Nam-gu); garrison HQ.
    - Camp Walker – Daegu; major operations and housing area.
    - Camp George – Daegu; housing/support
    - Camp Carroll – Waegwan (Chilgok County); logistics and maintenance hub
    - Busan Storage / Pier 8 – big logistics and port facility in Busan.
    - DLA Disposition Services, Gimcheon (Apo-eup) – logistics/disposal
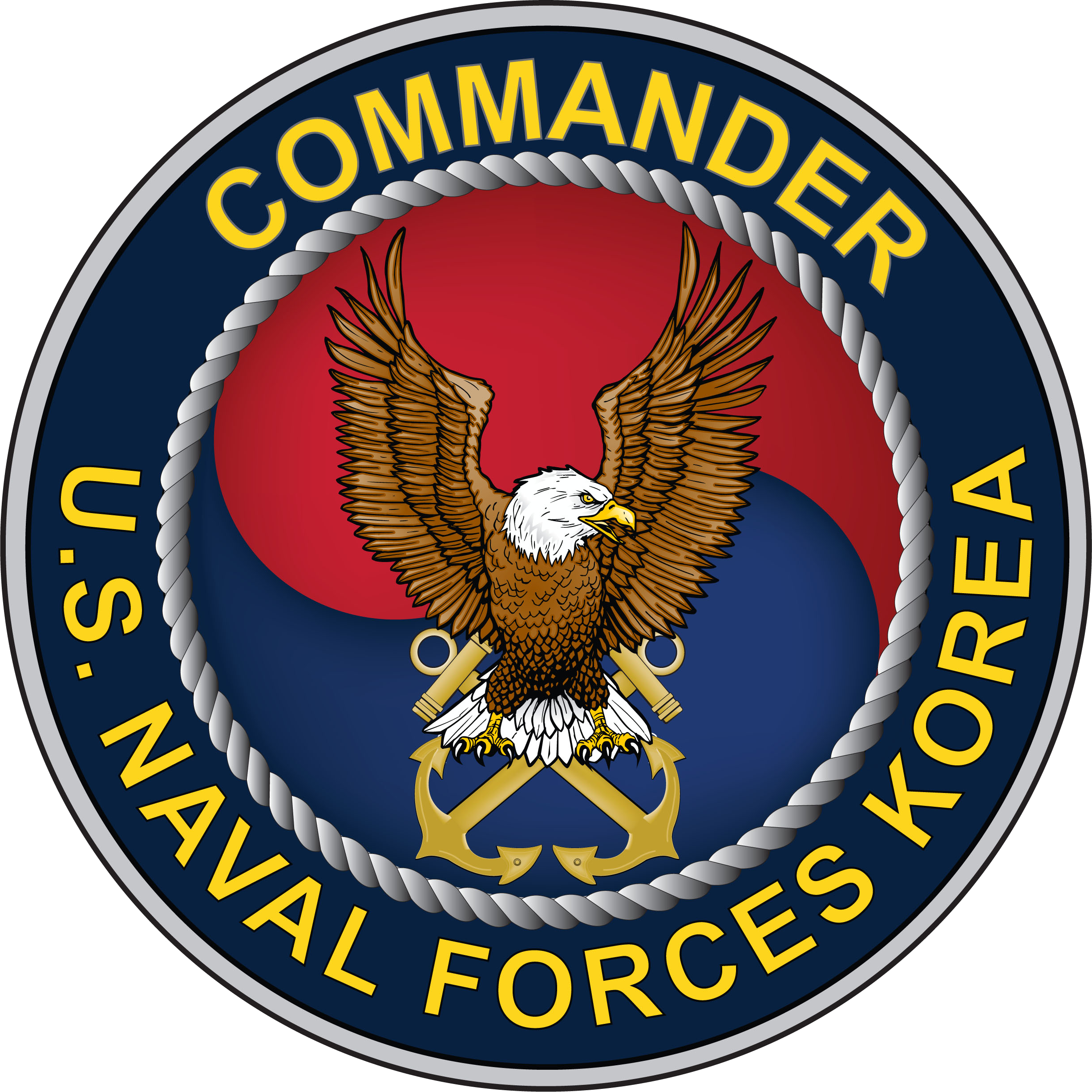
- Commander Naval Forces Korea (CNFK); Headquarters: Busan Naval Base, South Korea; authorized about 300 Sailors
  - Commander Fleet Activities Chinhae (CFAC) – Jinhae/Changwon
- Marine Forces Korea (MARFORK); Headquarters: Camp Humphreys, South Korea; authorized about 100 Marines
  - Camp Mujuk, Posan: Forward & Training Base for both US and ROK Marines.
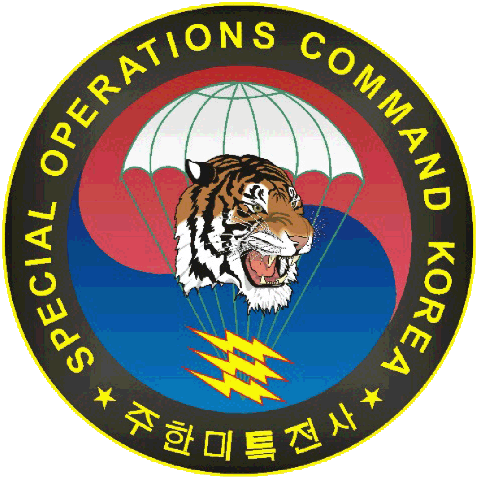
- Special Operations Command Korea (SOCKOR);
  Headquarters: Camp Humphreys, South Korea; authorized about 100 operators
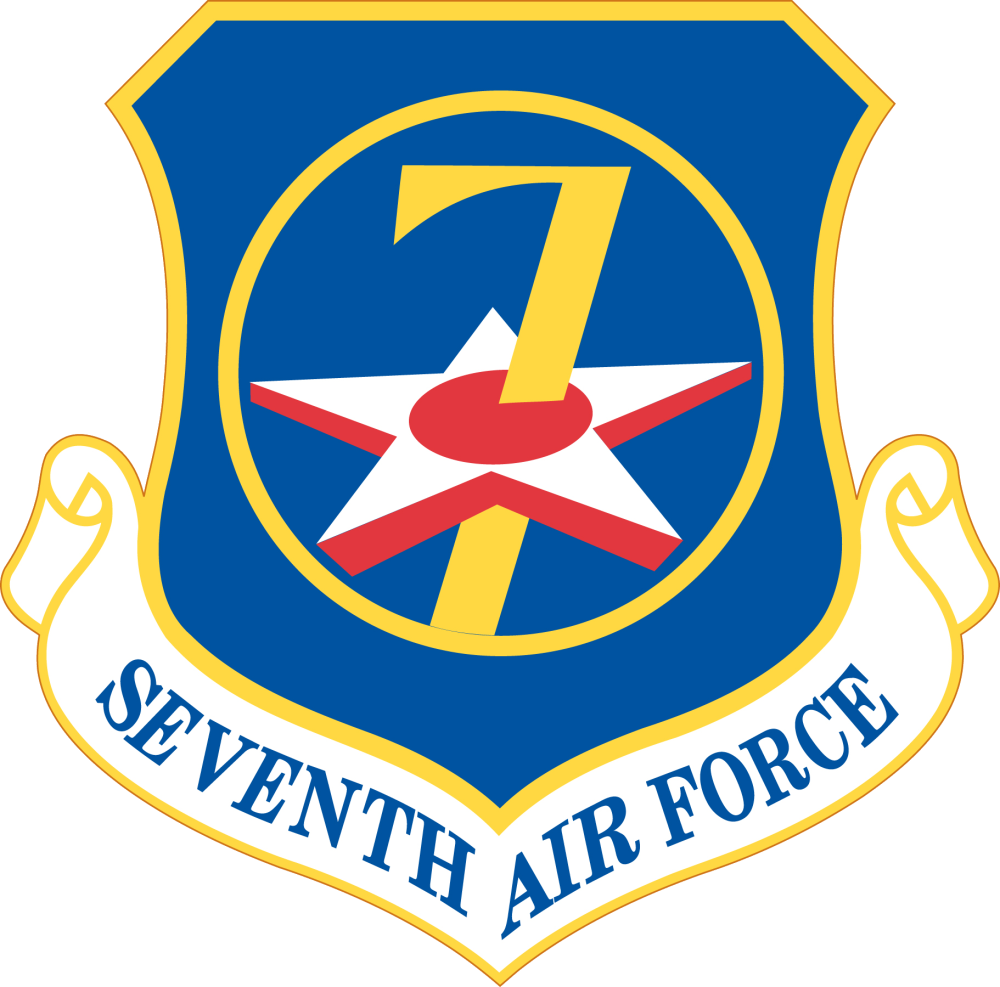
- Seventh Air Force (7 AF)
  Headquarters: Osan Air Base, South Korea; authorized about 8,000 Airmen
    - Units: HQ 7th Air Force, 51st Fighter Wing, plus ROKAF Operations Command and various tenant units.
  - Kunsan Air Base, Gunsan
    - Units: 8th Fighter Wing “Wolf Pack”
  - K-2 Airfield (Daegu Air Base) – USAF/ROKAF airfield on Daegu International Airport, supported by USAG Daegu.
- United States Space Forces Korea; Headquarters: Osan Air Base, South Korea; authorized about 30 Guardians

== United Nations Command and Combined Forces Command ==
Logo of the United Nations Command

Logo of the ROK/US Combined Forces Command

While USFK is a separate organization from United Nations Command (UNC) and ROK/US Combined Forces Command (CFC), its mission is to support both UNC and CFC by coordinating and planning among US component commands and providing US supporting forces to the CFC. As such, USFK continues to support the ROK-US Mutual Defense Treaty.

In response to the North Korean attack against South Korea on 25 June 1950, the United Nations Security Council (UNSC) established the UNC as a unified command under the US in UNSC Resolution 84 on 7 July 1950. The UNC mission was to assist South Korea to repel the attack and restore international peace and security in Korea. Throughout the war, 53 nations provided support to the UNC; 16 nations provided combat forces and five sent medical and hospital units. After three years of hostilities, the commanders of both sides signed the Armistice Agreement on 27 July 1953.

Hostilities today are also deterred by this bi-national defense team that evolved from the multi-national UNC. Established on 7 November 1978, the ROK/US Combined Forces Command (CFC) is the warfighting headquarters. Its role is to deter, or defeat if necessary, outside aggression against the ROK.

== Commanders, U.S. Forces Korea ==
No.	Commander		Term			Service branch
No.	Portrait	Name	Took office	Left office	Term length	Service branch
1	George Decker	General; George Decker (1902–1980)	1 July 1957	30 June 1959	1 year, 364 days	U.S. Army
2	Carter B. Magruder	General; Carter B. Magruder (1900–1988)	1 July 1959	30 June 1961	1 year, 364 days	U.S. Army
3	Guy S. Meloy	General; Guy S. Meloy (1903–1968)	1 July 1961	31 July 1963	2 years, 30 days	U.S. Army
4	Hamilton H. Howze	General; Hamilton H. Howze (1908–1998)	1 August 1963	15 June 1965	1 year, 318 days	U.S. Army
5	Dwight E. Beach	General; Dwight E. Beach (1908–2000)	16 June 1965	31 August 1966	1 year, 76 days	U.S. Army
6	Charles H. Bonesteel III	General; Charles H. Bonesteel III (1909–1977)	1 September 1966	30 September 1969	3 years, 29 days	U.S. Army
7	John H. Michaelis	General; John H. Michaelis (1912–1985)	1 October 1969	31 August 1972	2 years, 335 days	U.S. Army
8	Donald V. Bennett	General; Donald V. Bennett (1915–2005)	1 September 1972	31 July 1973	333 days	U.S. Army
9	Richard G. Stilwell	General; Richard G. Stilwell (1917–1991)	1 August 1973	8 October 1976	3 years, 68 days	U.S. Army
10	John W. Vessey Jr.	General; John W. Vessey Jr. (1922–2016)	8 October 1976	10 July 1979	2 years, 275 days	U.S. Army
11	John A. Wickham Jr.	General; John A. Wickham Jr. (1928–2024)	10 July 1979	4 June 1982	2 years, 329 days	U.S. Army
12	Robert W. Sennewald	General; Robert W. Sennewald (1929–2023)	4 June 1982	1 June 1984	1 year, 363 days	U.S. Army
13	William J. Livsey	General; William J. Livsey (1931–2016)	1 June 1984	25 June 1987	3 years, 24 days	U.S. Army
14	Louis C. Menetrey Jr.	General; Louis C. Menetrey Jr. (1929–2009)	25 June 1987	26 June 1990	3 years, 1 day	U.S. Army
15	Robert W. RisCassi	General; Robert W. RisCassi (born 1936)	26 June 1990	15 June 1993	2 years, 354 days	U.S. Army
16	Gary E. Luck	General; Gary E. Luck (1937–2024)	15 June 1993	9 July 1996	3 years, 24 days	U.S. Army
17	John H. Tilelli Jr.	General; John H. Tilelli Jr. (born 1941)	9 July 1996	9 December 1999	3 years, 153 days	U.S. Army
18	Thomas A. Schwartz	General; Thomas A. Schwartz (born 1945)	9 December 1999	1 May 2002	2 years, 143 days	U.S. Army
19	Leon J. LaPorte	General; Leon J. LaPorte (born 1946)	1 May 2002	3 February 2006	3 years, 278 days	U.S. Army
20	B.B. Bell	General; B.B. Bell (born 1947)	3 February 2006	3 June 2008	2 years, 121 days	U.S. Army
21	Walter L. Sharp	General; Walter L. Sharp (born 1952)	3 June 2008	14 July 2011	3 years, 41 days	U.S. Army
22	James D. Thurman	General; James D. Thurman (born 1953)	14 July 2011	12 October 2013	2 years, 80 days	U.S. Army
23	Curtis M. Scaparrotti	General; Curtis M. Scaparrotti (born 1956)	2 October 2013	30 April 2016	2 years, 211 days	U.S. Army
24	Vincent K. Brooks	General; Vincent K. Brooks (born 1958)	30 April 2016	8 November 2018	2 years, 192 days	U.S. Army
25	Robert B. Abrams	General; Robert B. Abrams (born 1960)	8 November 2018	2 July 2021	2 years, 236 days	U.S. Army
26	Paul LaCamera	General; Paul LaCamera (born 1963)	2 July 2021	20 December 2024	3 years, 171 days	U.S. Army
27	Xavier Brunson	General; Xavier Brunson (born c. 1965)	20 December 2024	Incumbent	1 year, 319 days	U.S. Army

== History ==
The following is a partial list of border incidents involving North Korea since the Armistice Agreement of 27 July 1953, ended large scale military action of the Korean War. Most of these incidents took place near either the Korean Demilitarized Zone or the Northern Limit Line. This list includes engagements on land, air and sea but does not include alleged incursions and terrorist incidents that occurred away from the border.

Many of the incidents occurring at sea are due to border disputes. The North claims jurisdiction over a large area south of the disputed western maritime border, the Northern Limit Line in the waters west of the Korean Peninsula. This is a prime fishing area, particularly for crabs, and clashes commonly occur. In addition, the North claims its territorial waters extend for 50 nautical miles (90 km) from the coast, rather than the 12 nautical miles (22 km) recognized by other countries. According to the 5 January 2011 Korea Herald, since July 1953 North Korea has violated the armistice 221 times, including 26 military attacks.

=== 1950s ===
- 16 February 1958: North Korean agents hijack a South Korean airliner to Pyongyang en route from Pusan to Seoul; one American pilot, one American passenger, two West German passengers and 24 other passengers were released in early March, but eight other passengers remained in the North.

=== 1960s ===
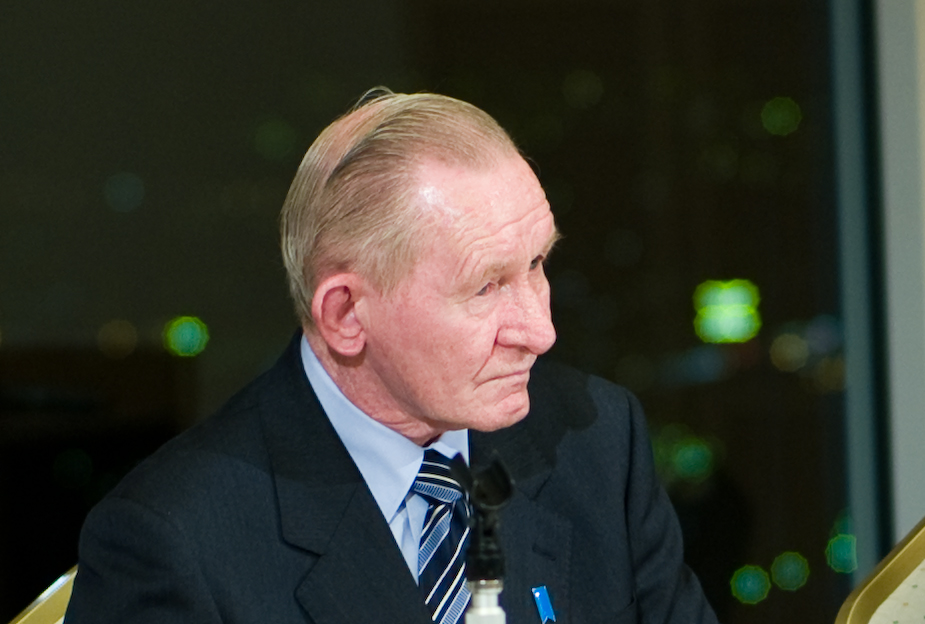
Sgt. Charles Jenkins in 2007

- May 1962: Pvt. Larry Allen Abshier abandoned his post in South Korea in May 1962 when he crept away from his base and crossed the DMZ into North Korea. Abshier was the first to defect. Also in May 1962, Cpl. Jerry Parrish crossed the DMZ into North Korea. His reasons for defecting, according to Jenkins' autobiography The Reluctant Communist, were "personal, and [Parrish] didn't elaborate about them much except to say that if he ever went home, his father-in-law would kill him."
- Aug 1962: James Joseph Dresnok was a Pfc. with a U.S. Army unit along the Korean Demilitarized Zone. Soon after his arrival he found himself facing a court martial for forging signatures on paperwork that gave him permission to leave base and which, ultimately, led to his being AWOL (Absent Without Official Leave). Unwilling to face punishment, on 15 August 1962, while his fellow soldiers were eating lunch, he ran across a minefield in broad daylight into North Korean territory, where he was quickly apprehended by North Korean soldiers. Dresnok was taken by train to Pyongyang, the North Korean capital, and interrogated.
- 1964: North Korea creates an underground group: Revolution Party for Reunification. This group is ground down and eliminated by South Korean authorities by 1969
- Jan 1965: Charles Jenkins, the most notable case, defected to North Korea. In South Korea he was assigned to night patrols. As a result of fears that he would be transferred to combat duty in Vietnam, he grew depressed and anxious, and started drinking alcohol. On the night of 4 January 1965, after reportedly drinking ten beers, he set off on his nightly patrol of the Demilitarized Zone. In the early morning he told his patrol that he was going to investigate a noise. He subsequently crossed into North Korea and surrendered to forces there, in hopes of being sent to Russia and then, through prisoner exchange, eventually returned to America. Shortly thereafter North Korean propaganda declared that a U.S. sergeant had defected, and broadcast statements allegedly made by the defector, reportedly in stilted English. The U.S. Army claimed Jenkins wrote four letters stating his intention to defect (an allegation Jenkins denies); however, the original letters are reportedly lost. His relatives maintained throughout his absence that he was abducted.
- 27 April 1965: Two North Korean MiG-17s attack a United States EC-121 Warning Star reconnaissance plane in the waters east of the Korean Peninsula, 80 km (50 mi) from the North Korean shore. The aircraft was damaged, but managed to land at Yokota Air Base, Japan.
- 17 January 1968: In an incident known as the Blue House Raid, a 31-man detachment from the Korean People's Army secretly crossed the DMZ on a mission to kill South Korean President Park Chung Hee on 21 January, nearly succeeding. The incursion was discovered after South Korean civilians confronted the North Koreans and informed South Korean authorities. After entering Seoul disguised as South Korean soldiers, the North Koreans attempt to enter the Blue House (the official residence of the President of South Korea). They are confronted by South Korean police and a firefight ensued. The North Koreans fled Seoul and individually attempted to cross the DMZ back to North Korea. Of the original group of 31 North Koreans, 28 were killed, one was captured and two are unaccounted for. Additionally, 68 South Koreans were killed and 66 were wounded, the majority of whom were soldiers and police officers. Three American soldiers were also killed and three were wounded.
- 23 January 1968: The United States Naval ship the USS Pueblo is boarded and captured, along with its crew, by North Korean forces in the waters east of the Korean Peninsula. The entire crew of 83 is captured, with the exception of one sailor killed in the initial attack on the vessel, and the vessel was taken to a North Korean port. All the captives were released on 23 December of the same year via the Bridge of No Return at the DMZ. The USS Pueblo is still in North Korean possession and is docked in Pyongyang and is on display as a museum ship.
- 30 October 1968: From 30 October-2 November 120–130 North Korean commandos land on the northeast shore of South Korea, allegedly to establish a base in order to wage a guerrilla war against the South Korean government. A total of 110–113 were killed, seven were captured and 13 escaped. Around 20 South Korean civilians, law enforcement officers and soldiers were killed.
- March 1969: Six North Korean commandos kill a South Korean police officer near Jumunjin, Gangwon-do. Seven American soldiers are killed in a North Korean attack along the DMZ.
- April 1969: An EC-121, U.S. reconnaissance plane is shot down 90 miles (140 km) east of the North Korean coast, leaving 31 dead.
- November 1969: Four U.S. soldiers are killed by North Koreans in the Demilitarized Zone.

=== 1970s ===
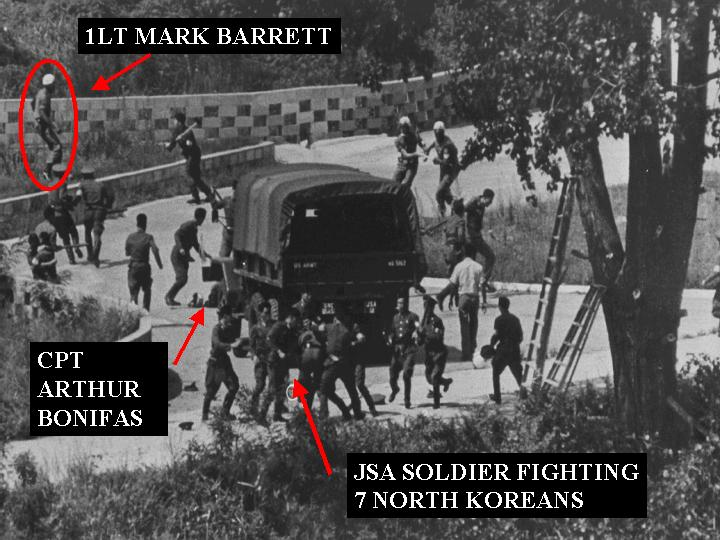
Axe murder incident on 18 August 1976

- April 1970: In Geumchon, a region of Paju south of the DMZ, a clash leaves three North Korean soldiers dead and five South Korean soldiers wounded.
- June 1970: The North Korean navy seizes a broadcast vessel from the South near the Northern Limit Line. Twenty crewmen are captured.
- February 1974: Two South Korean fishing vessels are sunk and 30 crew detained by the North.
- 1974: The first tunnel into ROK is discovered (the three following tunnels were found in 1975, 1978, 1990)
- June 1976: An incursion south of the DMZ in Gangwon-do leaves three dead from the North and six from the South.
- 18 August 1976: The Korean axe murder incident—an attempt to clear brush in the Demilitarized Zone near Panmunjom ends with two U.S. soldiers dead.
- October 1979: Three North Koreans enter the eastern DMZ. One is killed.
- December 1979: One U.S. Army soldier killed, three U.S. soldiers wounded after stumbling into a North Korean minefield in a heavy fog while patrolling DMZ. One body is recovered from the North Koreans five days later.

=== 1980s ===
- March 1980: Three North Koreans are killed while trying to cross the Han River estuary.
- May 1980: North Koreans engage OP Ouillette on DMZ in firefight. One North Korean WIA.
- March 1981: Three North Koreans try to enter the South in Geumhwa-eup, Cheorwon, Gangwon-do; one is killed.
- July 1981: Three North Koreans are killed trying to cross the Imjin River to the South.
- November 1984: Nine North Korean soldiers and one South Korean soldier die, and one American soldier is wounded, during a firefight that erupted when a North Korean security detail chased a defecting Soviet citizen (Vasily Matusak) across the MDL into the southern-controlled sector of the Joint Security Area.
- November 1987: One South Korean killed on DMZ central sector by North Korean sniper fire.

=== 1990s ===
- May 1992: Three North Korean soldiers in South Korean uniforms are killed in Cheolwon, Gangwon-do; three South Korean soldiers are wounded.
- December 1994: North Koreans shoot down US Army helicopter. One US KIA and one US POW for 13 days.
- May 1995: North Korean forces fire on a South Korean fishing boat, killing three crewmen.
- October 1995: Two armed North Koreans are discovered at the Imjin River; one is killed.
- April 1996: Several hundred armed North Korean troops cross repeatedly into the Demilitarized Zone.
- May 1996: Seven Northern soldiers cross south of the Demilitarized Zone, but withdraw after warning shots are fired.
- May & June 1996: North Korean vessels twice cross the Northern Limit Line and have a several-hour standoff with the South Korean navy.
- April 1997: Five North Korean soldiers cross the Demilitarized Zone in Cheolwon, Gangwon-do, and fire on South Korean positions.
- June 1997: Three North Korean vessels cross the Northern Limit Line and attack South Korean vessels two miles (3.2 km) south of the line. On land, 14 North Korean soldiers cross 70m south of the center of the DMZ, leading to a 23-minute exchange of fire.
- June 1999: A series of clashes between North and South Korean vessels takes place in the waters west of the Korean Peninsula near the Northern Limit Line.

=== 2000s ===
- 2001: On 12 separate occasions, North Korean vessels cross the Northern Limit Line and then withdraw.
- 27 November 2001: North and South Korean forces exchange fire without injuries.
- 29 June 2002: Renewed naval clashes near the Northern Limit Line lead to the deaths of four South Korean sailors and the sinking of a South Korean vessel. The number of North Koreans killed is unknown.
- 16 November 2002: South Korean forces fire warning shots at a Northern boat crossing the Northern Limit Line. The boat withdraws. A similar incident is repeated on 20 November.
- 19 February 2003: A North Korean fighter plane crosses seven miles (11 km) south of the Northern Limit Line, and returns north after being intercepted by six South Korean planes.
- 2 March 2003: Four North Korean fighter jets intercept a US reconnaissance plane over the waters east of the Korean Peninsula.
- 17 July 2003: North and South Korean forces exchange fire at the DMZ around 6:00 am. The South Korean army reports four rounds fired from the North and 17 from the South. No injuries are reported.
- 1 November 2004: North Korean vessels, claiming to be in pursuit of illegal fishing craft, cross the Northern Limit Line and are fired upon by the South. The vessels withdraw three hours later.
- 30 July 2006: Several rounds are exchanged near a South Korean post in Yanggu, Gangwon.
- 10 November 2009: Naval vessels from the two Koreas exchanged fire in the area of the NLL, reportedly causing serious damage to a North Korean patrol ship. For more details of this incident, see Battle of Daecheong.

=== 2010s ===
- 26 March 2010: A South Korean naval vessel, the ROKS Cheonan, was allegedly sunk by a North Korean torpedo near Baengnyeong Island in the waters west of the Korean Peninsula. A rescue operation recovered 58 survivors but 46 sailors died. On 20 May 2010 a South Korean-led international investigation group concluded that the sinking of the warship was in fact the result of a North Korean torpedo attack. North Korea denied involvement. The United Nations Security Council made a Presidential Statement condemning the attack but without identifying the attacker.
- 23 November 2010: North Korea fired artillery at South Korea's Greater Yeonpyeong island in the waters west of the Korean Peninsula and South Korea returned fire. Two South Korean marines and two South Korean civilians were killed, six were seriously wounded and ten were treated for minor injuries. Approximately 70 South Korean houses were destroyed. North Korean casualties were unknown, but Lee Hong-gi, the Director of Operations of the South Korean Joint Chiefs of Staff (JCS), claimed that as a result of the South Korean retaliation "there may be a considerable number of North Korean casualties".
- 2014: Some of the American forces that had withdrawn from South Korea to take part in the Iraq invasion have been replaced by the nine-month-long deployment of a battalion from the 1st Cavalry Division.
- 2019: President Trump sought an increased South Korean contribution toward USFK costs from $830 million to about $5 billion annually. This was not agreed, and resulted in the furlough without pay of about 4,500 South Korean civilian staff in April 2020.

=== Number of U.S. soldiers stationed in South Korea by year ===
Year	Number
1950	510
1951	42,069
1952	326,863
1953	326,863
1954	225,590
1955	75,328
1956	68,813
1957	71,045
1958	46,024
1959	49,827
1960	55,864
1961	57,694
1962	60,947
1963	56,910
1964	62,596
1965	58,636
1966	47,076
1967	55,057
1968	62,263
1969	66,531
1970	52,197
1971	40,740
1972	41,600
1973	41,864
1974	40,387
1975	40,204
1976	39,133
1977	40,705
1978	41,565
1979	39,018
1980	38,780
1981	38,254
1982	39,194
1983	38,705
1984	40,785
1985	41,718
1986	43,133
1987	44,674
1988	45,501
1989	44,461
1990	41,344
1991	40,062
1992	35,743
1993	34,830
1994	36,796
1995	36,016
1996	36,539
1997	35,663
1998	36,890
1999	35,913
2000	36,565
2001	37,605
2002	37,743
2003	41,145
2004	40,840
2005	30,983
2020	28,500

== Exercises ==
Each year the ROK, the US and a selection of Sending States from the United Nations Command participate in multiple defense-oriented, combined and joint training events designed to defend the Republic of Korea, protect the region, and maintain and increase stability on the Korean peninsula.

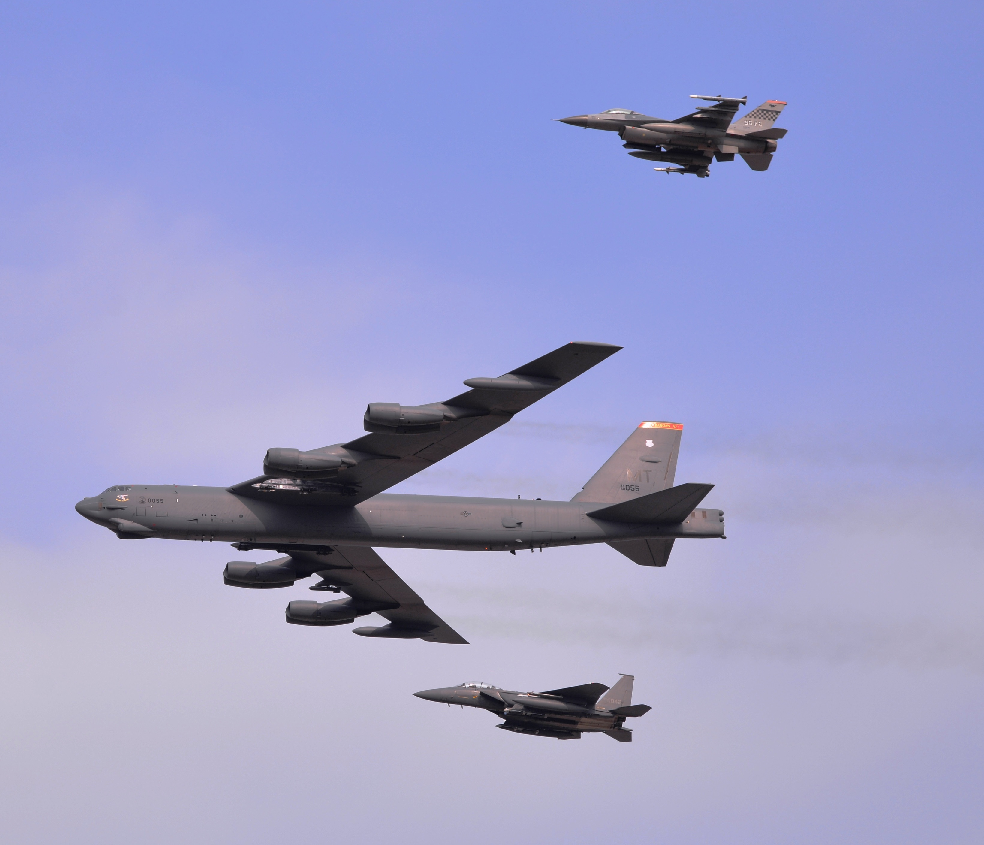
A U.S. Air Force B-52 Stratofortress conducted a low-level flight in the vicinity of Osan Air Base, South Korea.

Ulchi-Freedom Guardian, Key Resolve, and Foal Eagle, in addition to multiple Rehearsal of Concept (ROC) Drills, are the three theater level exercises.

- Ulchi-Freedom Guardian (UFG) is an annual simulation driven, command transformation-oriented Command Post Exercise (CPX). Elements of the ROK and US governments participate, as well as ROK and US forces from on and off the Korean peninsula. UFG integrates the annual ROK government exercise "Ulchi", which focuses on procedures for transitioning to war, government support. Ulchi also emphasizes ROK procedures for coordination between government and military organizations from the national to local level. UFG typically incorporates the following components: a Crisis Management Exercise focused on strategic and operational decisions needed to defuse a crisis, or posture the command for successful execution of the appropriate OPLAN if the enemy actions dictate; a Senior Leader Seminar (SLS) designed to foster senior-level discussion on a variety of topics related to crisis management and war-fighting; and a two-week Computer Assisted Exercise that exercises the transition to war, defense, and counteroffensive phases of the war-fight. The exercise culminates in detailed senior leader level After-Action Reviews (AARs).
- Key Resolve (KR) is over the course of a two-week-long CFC and ROK crisis management and war-fighting exercise. It provides invaluable opportunities to evaluate, train, and improves combined and joint coordination, procedures, plans and systems necessary for the conduct of contingency operations by ROK and US forces. It is a simulation driven Command Post exercise that exercises the defense of the ROK and the ability of the US to bring forces into the Theater of Operations to participate in that defense. The exercise culminates in detailed senior leader level AARs.
- Foal Eagle (FE) is a series of component-sponsored joint and combined Field Training Exercises (FTX) that support training of OPLAN related tasks via participation of selected off-peninsula units. FE demonstrates US power projection and rapid deployment capabilities and is conducted concurrently, but not linked to, the KR CPX. Tactical units are the primary FE FTX training audience exercising all aspects of CFC's mission; rear area security, support operations, RSOI, special operations, ground maneuver, expeditionary operations, air combat operations, and maritime operations.

In June 2018 the South Korea and the US claimed they are ready to stop the conducting of military drills in order to create significant opportunities for the negotiations with DPRK.

== Shoulder sleeve insignia ==
=== Description ===
A shield-shaped embroidered device 3 1/8 inches (7.9 cm) in height and 2 1/2 inches (6.4 cm) in width overall blazoned: azure, in chief four mullets bendwise argent, all above a stylized American bald eagle, issuant from sinister base volant to dexter chief; the eagle's body gules surmounted by two bendlets, wider at base, of the second throughout; head of the second, eyed of the field, leg and talons of the second grasping a laurel branch and seven arrows or. The entire shield shape is edged with a 1/16-inch (0.16 cm) white border. Attached above the device is a designation band in scarlet inscribed "USFK" in white letters. The entire device is edged with a 1/8-inch (0.32 cm) blue border.

=== Symbolism ===
The shield shape reflects the United States Forces Korea's steadfast commitment to help defend the sovereignty of South Korea. The abbreviation "USFK" stands for United States Forces Korea which activated on 1 July 1957. The four stars symbolize the service and contributions of the United States Army, United States Navy, United States Air Force, and the United States Marine Corps. The stylized American bald eagle represents cohesion and unity among the services. The laurel sprigs and arrows depict the mission of the United States Forces Korea to defeat aggression if necessary. Red, white, and blue are the colors of the flag of the United States of America. Red symbolizes hard work and honor, white represents innocence and purity, and blue refers to justice and perseverance. Yellow signifies wisdom and intuition.

=== Background ===
The shoulder sleeve insignia was approved on 18 June 2012. (TIOH Dwg. No. A-1-1077).

== Controversy ==
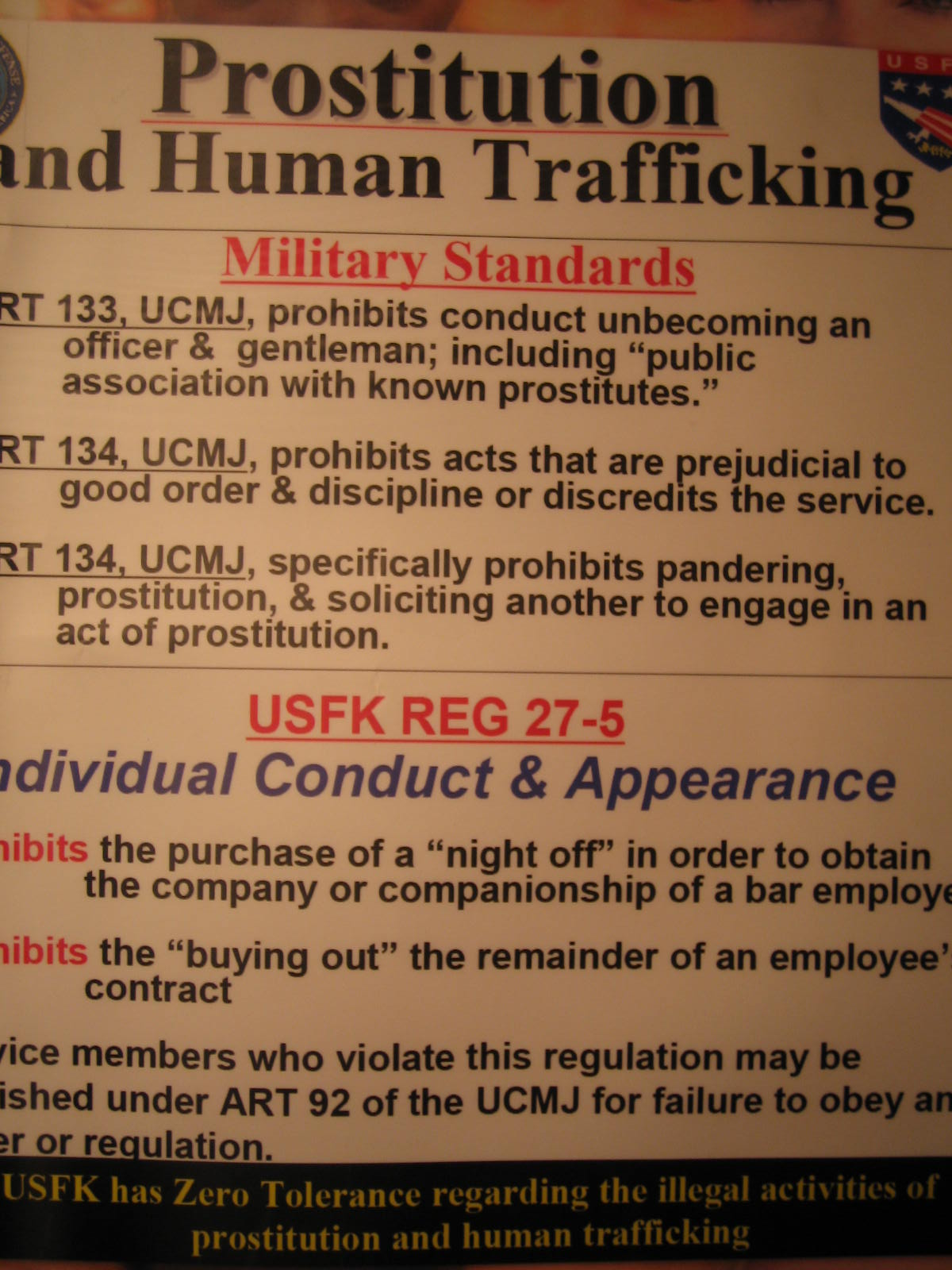
United States Forces Korea warns American soldiers not to hire prostitutes or get involved in human trafficking.

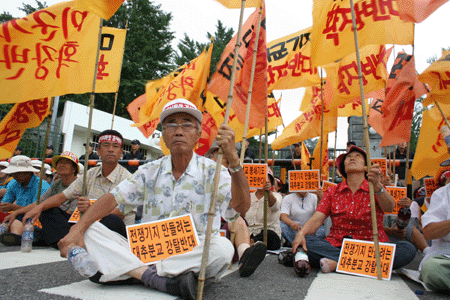
South Koreans protest the expansion of Camp Humphreys in 2006.

=== Gwangju Uprising ===
The 1980s marked a surge in anti-Americanism in Korea, widely traced to the events of May 1980.

Gwangju convinced a new generation of young [Koreans] that the democratic movement had developed not with the support of Washington, as an older generation of more conservative Koreans thought, but in the face of daily American support for any dictator who could quell the democratic aspirations of the Korean people. The result was an anti-American movement in the 1980s that threatened to bring down the whole structure of American support for the ROK. American cultural centers were burned to the ground (more than once in Gwangju); students immolated themselves in protest of Reagan's support for Chun [Doo-hwan].

Fundamental to this movement was a perception of U.S. complicity in Chun's rise to power, and, more particularly, in the Gwangju massacre itself. These matters remain controversial. It is clear, for example, that the U.S. authorized the Korean Army's 20th Division to re-take Gwangju – as acknowledged in a 1982 letter to the New York Times by then-Ambassador Gleysteen.

[General Wickham], with my concurrence, permitted transfer of well-trained troops of the twentieth R.O.K.A. Division from martial-law duty in Seoul to Gwangju because law and order had to be restored in a situation that had run amok following the outrageous behavior of the Korean Special Forces, which had never been under General Wickham's command.

However, as Gwangju Uprising editors Scott-Stokes and Lee note, whether the expulsion of government troops left the situation lawless or "amok" is very much open to dispute.

=== 21st century ===
In 2002, anti-American sentiment in South Korea spiked after two U.S. soldiers in an M60 armored vehicle-launched bridge (AVLB) accidentally hit and killed two South Korean teenage girls in the Yangju highway incident.

An expansion of Camp Humphreys later in the decade served as a catalyst for the Daechuri Protests, drawing thousands of South Korean citizens, resulting in occasional violent clashes and arrests. Following a series of large protests against the U.S. and Republic of Korea governments' plan to expand Camp Humphreys and make it the main base for most U.S. troops in South Korea, residents of Daechuri and other small villages near Pyeongtaek agreed to a government settlement to leave their homes in 2006 and allow the base's expansion. Compensation for the land averaged 600 million won (about US$600,000) per resident.

With the relocation of the new USFK and UNC headquarters to Camp Humphreys (in Pyeongtaek) on 29 June 2018, the USFK command and the majority of its subordinate units have officially moved out of the city of Seoul; headquarters are now 35 km (22 mi) further south.

During the COVID-19 pandemic, members of USFK, and other foreign nationals were reported to have no-mask parties at Haeundae Beach in Busan for the Independence Day of 2020, and the Memorial Day of 2021, despite local social distancing restrictions. They engaged in unruly behavior, which included playing loud music, heavy drinking, and the shooting of firecrackers at locals.

Despite its controversies, the USFK continues to maintain strong support from South Korean Citizens, who have voiced their support for U.S. Military presence within the country citing China and North Korea as major factors. Many South Korean Citizens have additionally voiced support on social media for Nuclear Armament if the U.S. were to withdraw its troops from the Peninsula.

In April 2026, the commander of USFK, General Xavier Brunson, outlined a concept to link the military capabilities of South Korea, Japan, and the Philippines into a "kill web" – a real-time networked system where any sensor can pass targeting data to any shooter. The proposal aims to enable a coordinated response to threats from North Korea, China, and Russia across land, sea, air, space, cyber, and electromagnetic domains, with South Korea envisioned as a central sustainment hub.

=== Relationships between U.S. soldiers and South Korean women ===
Western princesses (prostitutes servicing U.S. soldiers) have resulted in a negative image for South Korean women who have relationships with American men.

== See also ==
- 38th parallel north
- Aftermath of the Korean War
- Division of Korea
- Korean Augmentation To the United States Army
- Korean People's Army
- List of United States Army installations in South Korea
- Mutual Defense Treaty Between the United States and the Republic of Korea
- OPLAN 5027 and OPLAN 5029
- Republic of Korea Armed Forces
- U.S.–South Korea Status of Forces Agreement
- United States Army Military Government in Korea (1945–1948)
- United States Forces Japan (USFJ)
- United States Taiwan Defense Command (USTDC)
