= James D. Thurman =

US Army general

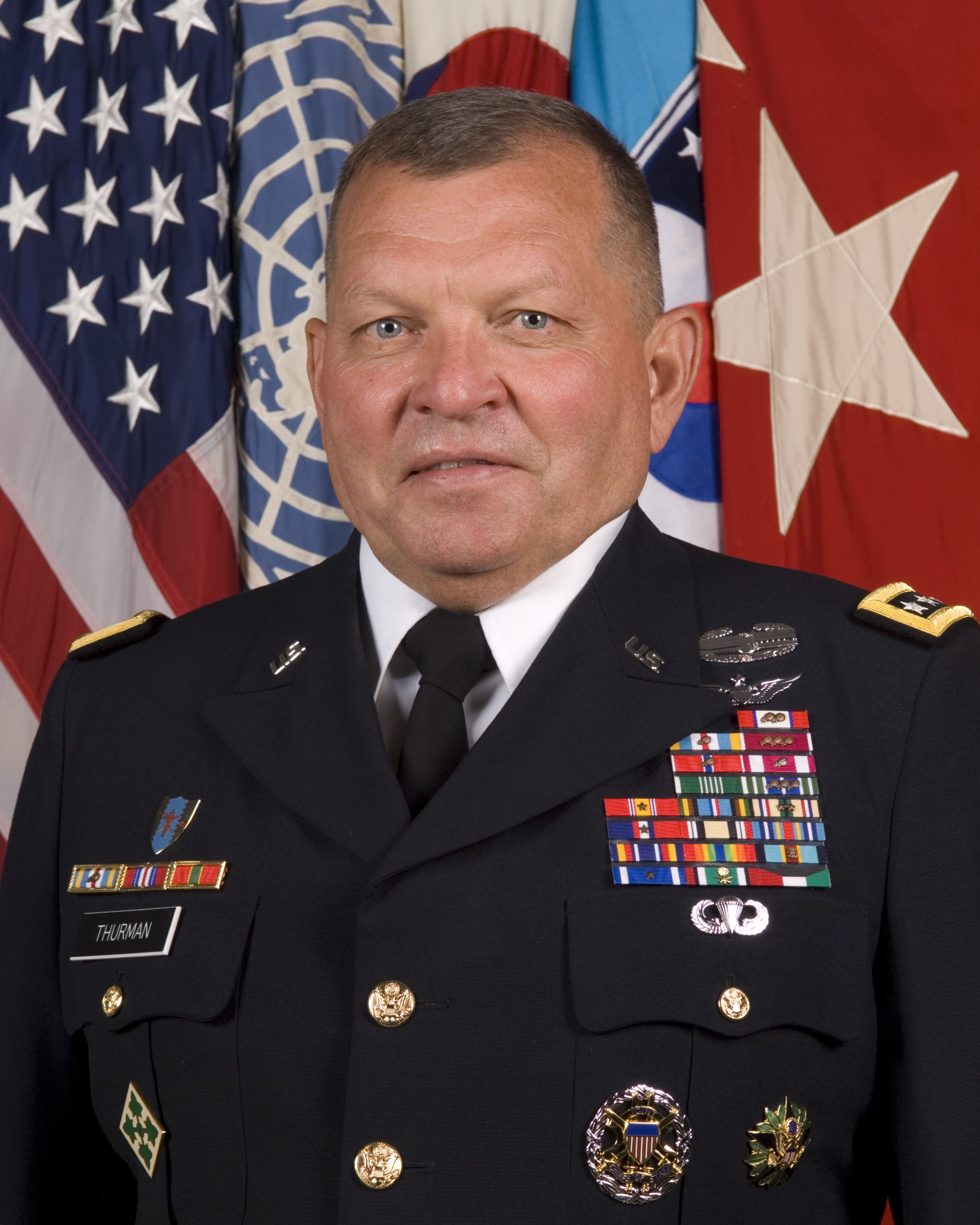
- Official portrait, 2011
- Born: 19 September 1953 (age 73); Gainesville, Texas, U.S.
- Military career
- Allegiance: United States
- Branch: United States Army
- Service years: 1975–2013
- Rank: General
- Commands: United Nations Command; ROK-U.S. Combined Forces Command; United States Forces Korea; United States Army Forces Command; V Corps; 4th Infantry Division; Fort Irwin National Training Center; 2nd Brigade, 3rd Infantry Division (Mechanized)
- Conflicts: Gulf War; Iraq War
- Awards: Defense Distinguished Service Medal; Army Distinguished Service Medal (5); Defense Superior Service Medal (2); Legion of Merit (4); Bronze Star Medal (2)

James David Thurman (born 19 September 1953) is a retired United States Army general who served as the Commander of United Nations Command, R.O.K.-U.S. Combined Forces Command, and United States Forces Korea from 14 July 2011 until 2 October 2013. He previously served as the 18th Commanding General, United States Army Forces Command from 3 June 2010 to 8 July 2011 and as Deputy Chief of Staff, G-3/5/7. He was the former commanding general of United States V Corps in Heidelberg, Germany from 19 January 2007 to 8 August 2007.

== Early life and education ==
Thurman's family was from Marietta, Oklahoma, and he was born in nearby Gainesville, Texas, on September 19, 1953. He was raised in Marietta and received a Bachelor of Arts degree in history from East Central University. Thurman received a Regular Army Commission from the United States Army as a second lieutenant in 1975. His civilian education also includes a Master of Arts degree in management from Webster University.

== Career ==
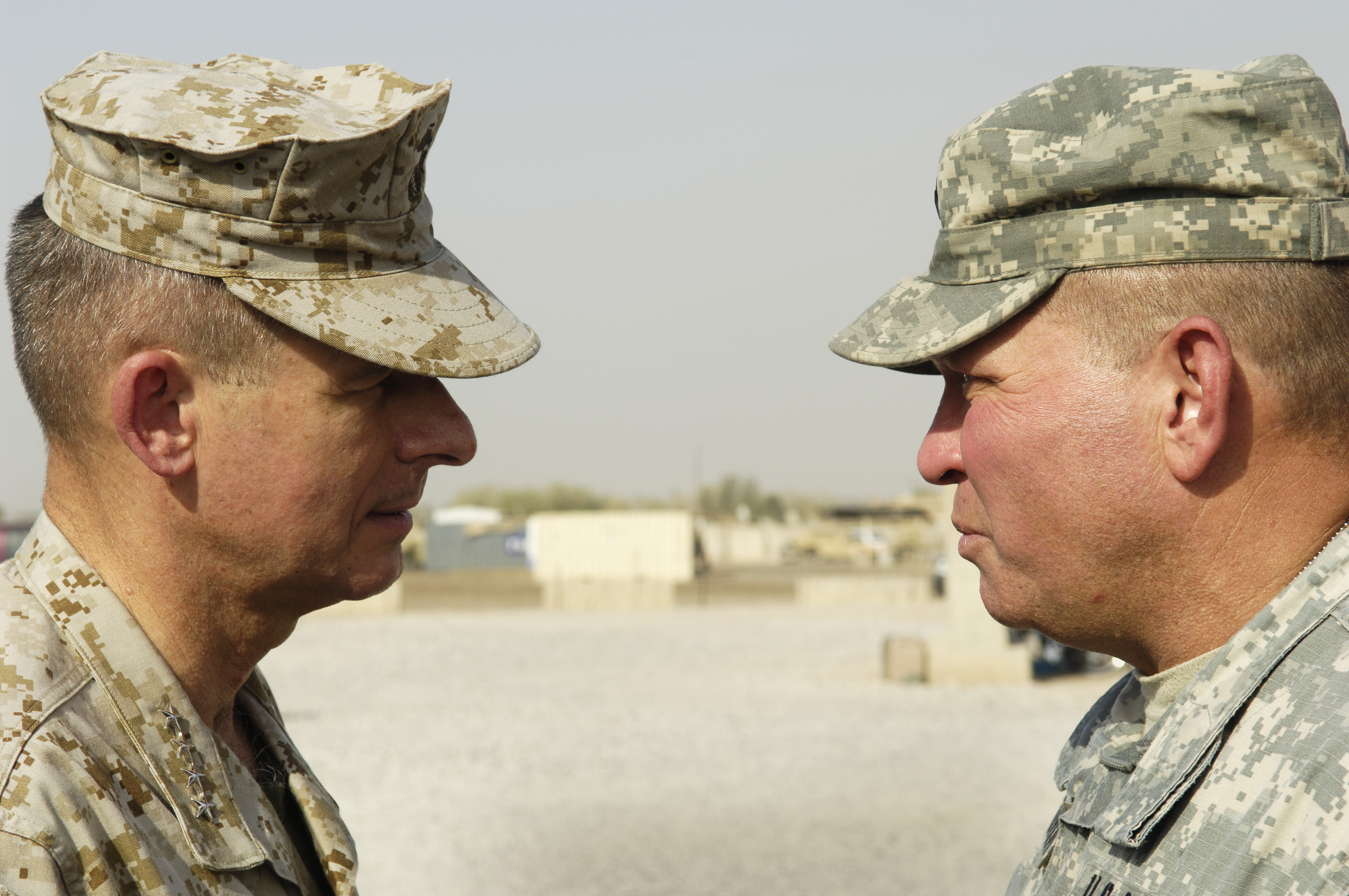
Thurman (right) in August 2006, talking to General Peter Pace, Chairman of the Joint Chiefs of Staff

Thurman began his career in the 4th Infantry Division, serving as Platoon Leader, Executive Officer, and Motor Officer for 6th Battalion, 32d Armor. He has commanded at all levels from company to division. After attending the Officer Rotary Wing Aviator Course, he commanded the Aero-Scout Platoon and later became the Operations Officer, A Troop, 1st Squadron, 17th Cavalry, 82nd Airborne Division, Fort Bragg, North Carolina.

From 1981 to 1982, Thurman attended the Armor Officer Advanced Course, United States Army Armor School, Fort Knox, Kentucky. Upon completion, he attended the AH-64 Aviator Qualification Course, United States Army Aviation Center of Excellence at Fort Rucker, Alabama, and then as Executive Officer, 3rd Squadron, 6th Cavalry Brigade, Fort Hood, Texas.

During 1989 to 1991, Thurman served as Executive Officer of the 1st Battalion, 32d Armor, 1st Cavalry Division and Operations Desert Shield and Desert Storm, Saudi Arabia.

Thurman's previous assignments also include Commander of 2nd Squadron, 2nd Armored Cavalry Regiment; 3d Squadron, 4th Cavalry, 3rd Infantry Division (Mechanized), United States Army Europe and Seventh Army, Germany; Commander, 2nd Brigade, 3rd Infantry Division (Mechanized), Fort Stewart, Georgia; Commander, Operations Group, United States Army National Training Center, Fort Irwin, California; Assistant to the Chief of Staff for Plans and Policy, Allied Forces Southern Europe, Regional Command South, Italy; Commanding General, Fort Irwin National Training Center, Fort Irwin, California; Director of Training, Office of the Deputy Chief of Staff, G-3, United States Army; and Chief, Operations, Coalition Forces Land Component Command, Operation Iraqi Freedom, Camp Doha, Kuwait.

Thurman left Kuwait to become the director, Army Aviation Task Force, Office of the Deputy Chief of Staff, G-3, United States Army in Washington, D.C., where he remained until his arrival at Fort Hood as the 4th Infantry commanding general.

On 2 October 2006, Thurman was nominated for promotion by President George W. Bush for appointment to the rank of lieutenant general. His receipt of promotion and his third star was 19 January 2007. On 19 December 2006, Thurman took over assignment in Heidelberg, Germany as the commanding general of V Corps along with the United States Army Europe and Seventh Army. His retirement ceremony was held at Fort Hood, Texas, on 22 November 2013.

== Awards and decorations ==
Awards and decorations

Defense Distinguished Service Medal
Distinguished Service Medal with four bronze oak leaf clusters
Defense Superior Service Medal with oak leaf cluster
Legion of Merit with three oak leaf clusters
Bronze Star Medal with oak leaf cluster
Meritorious Service Medal with silver oak leaf cluster
Army Commendation Medal
Army Achievement Medal with three oak leaf cluster
Joint Meritorious Unit Award with one bronze oak leaf cluster
Valorous Unit Award
Superior Unit Award
National Defense Service Medal with one bronze service star
Armed Forces Expeditionary Medal
Southwest Asia Service Medal with two bronze service stars
Kosovo Campaign Medal with one bronze service star
Iraq Campaign Medal
Global War on Terrorism Expeditionary Medal
Global War on Terrorism Service Medal
Korea Defense Service Medal
Army Service Ribbon
Army Overseas Service Ribbon (with bronze award numeral 5)
NATO Medal for the former Yugoslavia with one service star
Order of National Security Merit, Tong-il Medal (Republic of Korea)
Kuwait Liberation Medal (Saudi Arabia)
Kuwait Liberation Medal (Kuwait)

Badges

Combat Action Badge
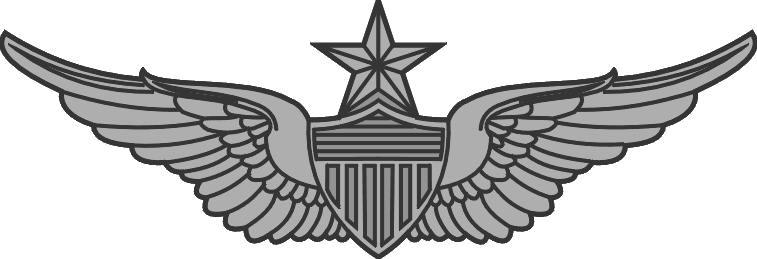
Senior Aviator Badge
Basic Parachutist Badge
Army Staff Identification Badge
Joint Staff Identification Badge
4th Infantry Division CSIB
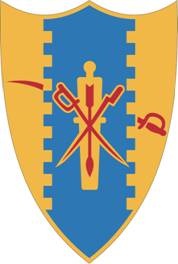
4th Cavalry Regiment Distinctive Unit Insignia
4 Overseas Service Bars

Military offices
Preceded by Walter L. Sharp	Commander of United Nations Command; Commander of United States Forces Korea; Commander of ROK/US Combined Forces Command; 2011–2013	Succeeded by Curtis M. Scaparrotti
