= Combat operations process =

Undertaken by armed forces

Combat operations area - process is undertaken by armed forces during military campaigns, major operations, battles, and engagements to facilitate the setting of objectives, direction of combat, and assessment of the operation plan's success.

The basic model of the combat operations area process includes five phases that seek to acquire targets and objectives, allocate and orient appropriate forces for successful engagement of the enemy, make decisions about doctrinal approach to the engagement, execute the plan by engaging in combat, and conduct post-combat intelligence assessment of the success or failure of the operation's plan.
