= Operations Plan 5027 =

United States military operations plans

OPLAN 5027
- Part of Korean conflict
- Location: Korean peninsula
- Planned: 1973-present
- Planned by: ROK-US Combined Forces Command
- Objective: US/ROK defense against a North Korean invasion

Operations Plan 5027 (OPLAN 5027) are a series of military operations plans made by the United States and South Korea for the defense against a possible North Korean invasion.

== History ==
Before 1973, OPLAN 5027 was primarily focused on defeating a North Korean invasion, with a 50-mile retreat from the penetrated Demilitarized Zone to positions south of the Han River (known as the Hollingsworth Line). Allied forces would then wait for American, British and allied reinforcements before counterattacking.

With the withdrawal of the United States from Vietnam and concerns of North Korea doubting America's commitment to defend South Korea, Combined Forces Commander US General James F. Hollingsworth developed a forward-based offensive strategy known as OPLAN 5027-74. The new plans called for most artillery, tanks, and infantry to be moved toward the Military Control Zone five miles south of the Demilitarized Zone. Offensive strategies following the defeat of invasion forces included two brigades of the US 2nd Division to seize the nearby city of Kaesong, around-the-clock B-52 bomber raids, and a "violent, short war" to capture the capital city of Pyongyang. No mention was made of the use of tactical nuclear weapons in case of overwhelming North Korean forces, though the Congressional Budget Office predicted that without their use, the new strategy could result in the initial loss of Seoul.

A variant of the operation plan, OPLAN 5027-94, was reportedly under consideration by CINCPAC in 1994 for a scenario where South Korean forces could halt a North Korean invasion and stabilize a defensive line at FEBA Bravo, twenty to thirty miles from the DMZ. With the arrival of American and allied reinforcements, a major air campaign would be waged against North Korea before a land offensive by a US Marine Expeditionary Force (in division strength), the 82nd Airborne Division, and South Korean divisions towards Wonsan. A combined US-ROK force would also stage an amphibious landing near Wonsan, with the two forces joining for an advance on Pyongyang. The scenario depended on South Korean forces holding out against a North Korean advance for an initial 5–15 days, as well as potentially another 15–20 days during preparations for the counteroffensive.

Following concerns over a North Korean nuclear program, OPLAN 5027 was completely overhauled with OPLAN 5027-96, which included a new agreement with the Japanese government for the use of Japanese bases in the event of a war. Further revisions and more detailed offensive strategies were incorporated in late 1998 into OPLAN 5027-98, with new focus on countering sudden chemical and biological attacks against Seoul. Reports claim that the operation would be divided into four phases: activities prior to a North Korean attack (preemptive attacks against military bases on strong intelligence of invasion preparations), halting an initial North Korean assault, regrouping for counterattacks, and a full-scale invasion of North Korea to seize Pyongyang (with a strategy of maneuver warfare north of the Demilitarized Zone with a goal of terminating the North Korean regime). When OPLAN 5027-98 was leaked to the press in November 1998, tensions escalated, with North Korea calling the plan a war scenario for invasion.

Details have emerged on subsequent revisions to the operation plan, including an increased Korean deployment of 690,000 troops in OPLAN 5027-00 in the event of the United States being involved in a two-front war, updates in OPLAN 5027-02 in light of the 11 September attacks and the Bush Doctrine of pre-emptive military action (even without consulting South Korea), larger substitution of air power (missiles and UAVs) for ground forces and artillery in OPLAN 5027-04 and OPLAN 5027-06, and a multi-year realignment of American forces in OPLAN 5027-08.

== Scenarios ==
Most known versions of OPLAN 5027 assume a surprise attack by North Korea, with the initial intent of destroying allied defenses and gaining a significant foothold before the rallying of South Korean forces or American reinforcements. North Korea would presumably try to leverage its quantitative advantage of troop strength against the perceived superior technological capabilities of South Korean and US forces.

A major threat of a Korean conflict is the bombardment of the South Korean capital of Seoul, which is one of the world's largest cities and has nearly forty percent of the country's population living within forty miles of it.

With an artillery force of over 12,000 self-propelled and towed weapon systems, though outdated and with limited range, North Korea could "sustain up to 500,000 rounds an hour against Combined Forces Command defenses for several hours." Short-range attacks with nuclear, chemical, or biological warheads are also possible for crossing the Demilitarized Zone or attacks against Seoul, with initial casualties in the thousands/tens of thousands.

There is much debate, however, over how far North Korean forces could progress south or whether they could sustain a prolonged offensive against South Korean and American forces, especially with the latter's presumed air and naval superiority. Most allied plans do not assume that North Korea could successfully consolidate gains around Seoul or breaks along the Demilitarized Zone.

A paper in the Strategic Studies Quarterly (SSQ) cites several reasons why China would not side with North Korea if North Korea initiated an unprovoked attack on South Korea without prior Chinese approval: today's China has no agenda to promote their political ideology, and economic progress would be harmed from a prolonged war. This analysis does not discuss regime anarchy, political upheavals, or any other circumstance which would involve humanitarian crises in North Korea.

== Espionage ==
In December 2009, South Korean media reported that North Korean hackers may have stolen secret information from OPLAN 5027 after a South Korean officer used an unsecured USB memory stick on his work computer, violating security regulations.

In April 2017, Korean media reported that the Defense Security Command and the National Intelligence Service concluded that somewhere in 2016 the Operation Plan 5027 was exposed to hackers, likely North Koreans via Shenyang, China. The ministry is considering sanctions for those personnel responsible for the security breach.

== See also ==
- OPLAN 5029
- Military of North Korea
- Military of South Korea
- Korean reunification
