= Military operation plan =

List of actions an armed force intends to carry out to achieve combat goals

A military operation plan (commonly called a war plan before World War II) is a formal plan for military armed forces, their military organizations and units to conduct operations, as drawn up by commanders within the combat operations process in achieving objectives before or during a conflict. Military plans are generally produced in accordance with the military doctrine of the troops involved. Because planning is a valuable exercise for senior military staff, in peacetime nations generally produce plans (of varying detail) even for very unlikely hypothetical scenarios.

Plan XVII and the Schlieffen Plan are examples of World War I military plans. The United States developed a famous color-coded set of war plans in the early 20th century; see United States color-coded war plans.

Military plans often have code names.

== United States ==
A U.S. Department of Defense Operations Plan (OPLAN) is a complete and detailed plan for conducting joint military operations. Such plans are developed by the staff of a unified combatant command in response to actual or potential situations for which military operations may be required. An OPLAN is executed when the commander issues an operations order (OPORD), or when the chairman of the Joint Chiefs of Staff (CJCS) issues an execute order (EXORD) at the direction of the United States secretary of defense to implement a decision by the president to initiate military operations. A concept plan (CONPLAN) is an operation plan in concept form, often lacking the level of details normally found in other military plans.

Among publicly known U.S. Operations Plans are two which address possible events on the Korean Peninsula, OPLAN 5027, the U.S. general war plan which has been regularly updated since at least the mid-1990s, and OPLAN 5029, a plan catering to a sudden collapse of the Democratic People's Republic of Korea. OPLAN 8044 and OPLAN 8010 are both successor plans to the Single Integrated Operational Plan, the general plan for nuclear war from 1961 to 2003. OPLAN 1003-98 was the pre-2002 plan for war with Iraq. As of 2024, the current general plan is OPLAN 8010–12.

== North Atlantic Treaty Organization ==
In the North Atlantic Treaty Organization (NATO) the successful planning of multinational military operations requires common doctrine. This doctrine is documented in Allied Joint Publication (AJP) five, which is aimed primarily at those engaged in operational-level planning, specifically commanders and staffs employed in joint force command headquarters and component command headquarters. It describes the fundamental aspects of planning joint operations at the operational level and provides an overarching framework of the key planning principles, considerations and process steps that are followed in operational-level planning.

== See also ==
- United States color-coded war plans
- List of established military terms
