= Burwell B. Bell III =

United States Army general

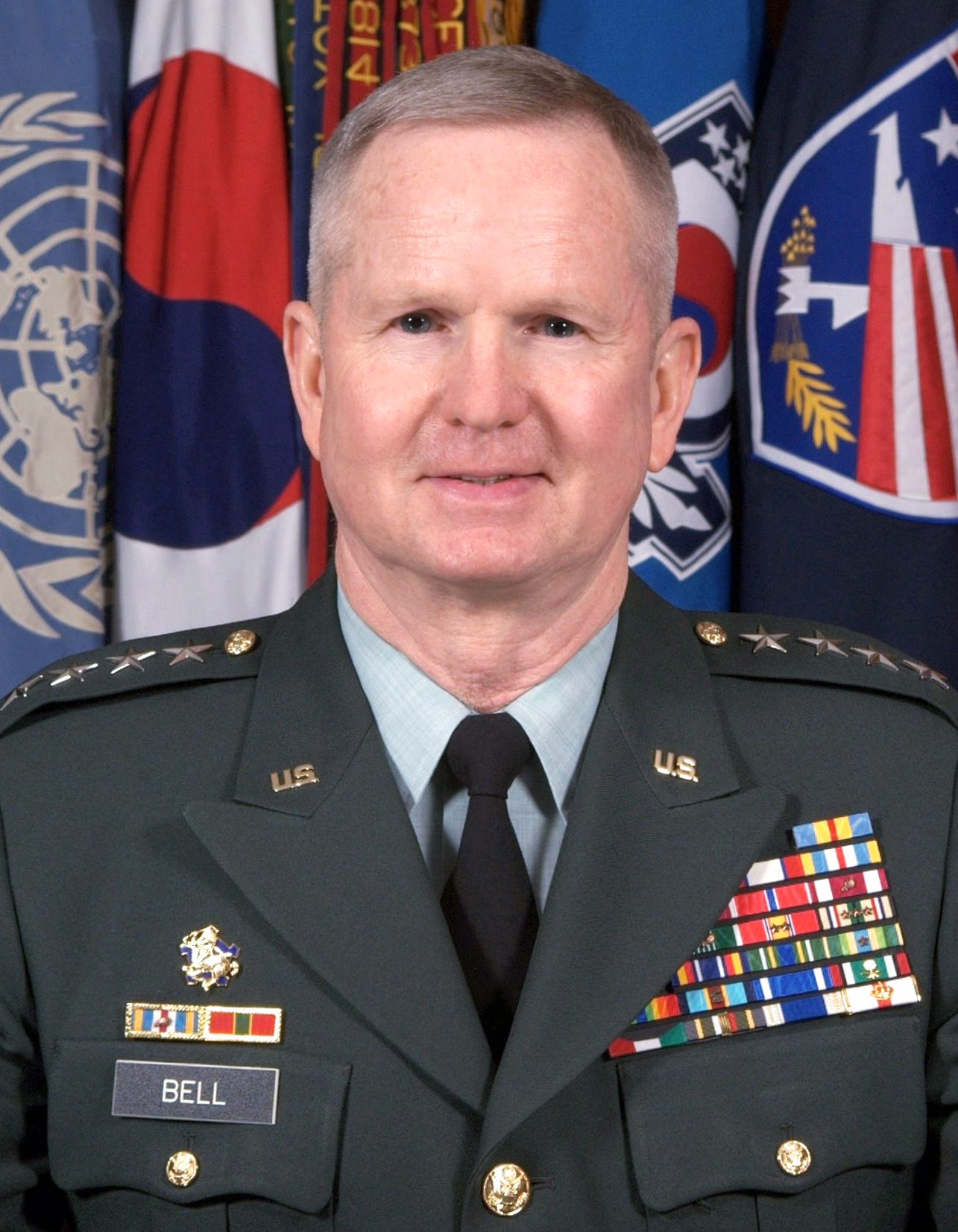
- Official portrait, 2008
- Born: 9 April 1947 (age 79); Oak Ridge, Tennessee, U.S.
- Relatives: Married with one son
- Military career
- Allegiance: United States
- Branch: United States Army
- Service years: 1969–2008
- Rank: General
- Commands: United Nations Command; ROK-US Combined Forces Command; United States Army Europe; III Corps
- Conflicts: Gulf War
- Awards: Defense Distinguished Service Medal (2); Army Distinguished Service Medal; Defense Superior Service Medal; Legion of Merit (5); Bronze Star Medal

Burwell Baxter Bell III (born 9 April 1947) is a retired United States Army four-star general.

== Early life and education ==
Bell was born and raised in Oak Ridge, Tennessee, the son of Burwell B. Bell Jr. His father was a West Point graduate who worked in government nuclear facilities at Oak Ridge. Bell is the great-great-grandson of Arkansas Governor Henry Massie Rector and Mississippi governor and senator James L. Alcorn. He graduated from Oak Ridge High School in 1965 and played high school football for the "Wildcats". In 1969 he graduated from the University of Chattanooga (now the University of Tennessee at Chattanooga), where he was a member of Kappa Sigma fraternity, with a degree in Business Administration. As a Distinguished Military Graduate of the university's ROTC Program, Bell was commissioned in the United States Army in June 1969 as an Armor/Tank second lieutenant. Later, he received a Master of Science in Systems Management from the University of Southern California. Over the years, Bell also received Honorary Doctorate Degrees from the University of Maryland, University College; Keimyung University, South Korea; and the University of Tennessee.

== Military career ==
During his military service, Bell completed the United States Army Armor School, Armor Officer Basic and Advanced Courses, United States Army Command and General Staff College, and the National War College. He also completed the army's Ranger School where he was awarded the Ranger Tab.

From 1969 to 1972, Bell spent his initial assignment in the Army with the 3d Squadron, 14th Armored Cavalry Regiment in Bad Hersfeld, West Germany. During this initial three-year period of service during the Cold War, he led units patrolling the Iron Curtain between East and West Germany.

During his 39-year active duty career, Bell's command positions included L Troop, 3d Squadron, 14th Armored Cavalry Regiment; D troop, 5th Reconnaissance Squadron; the 2nd Squadron, 9th Cavalry, 24th Infantry Division (Mechanized); and the 24th Infantry Division's 2nd Brigade Combat Team.

In 1994 Bell served as a Senior Military Fellow at the Council on Foreign Relations in New York City, and has since been selected as a serving member on the council. Bell deployed as General Norman Schwarzkopf Jr.'s Executive Officer in Desert Shield and Desert Storm; and later served as Chief of Staff, USAREUR Forward Headquarters, Taszar, Hungary during Operation Joint Endeavor in the Balkans.

From June 1995 through August 1996 and as a brigadier general, Bell served as an Assistant Division Commander in both the 3d and 1st Infantry Divisions located at Warner Barracks in Bamberg, Germany.

From August 1996 to July 1999 Bell served as Chief of Staff of V Corps, and as Deputy Chief of Staff, Operations and subsequently Chief of Staff, United States Army, Europe and Seventh United States Army.

As a major general Bell commanded the United States Army Armor Center and Fort Knox from July 1999 through August 2001 at Fort Knox, Kentucky. As a lieutenant general, Bell commanded the Army's III Corps from August 2001 to November 2002, headquartered at Fort Hood, Texas. Following Corps Command, Bell was promoted to four-star general and commanded the United States Army, Europe and 7th Army, as well as NATO's Land Component Command, Heidelberg, Germany. On completion of his command assignments in Europe, in 2006 Bell was reassigned to South Korea where he commanded U.S. Forces, Korea, the Korea—U.S. Combined Forces Command, and the United Nations Command.

He retired from the Army in 2008.

Bell's staff positions included service as an ROTC instructor at Texas Tech University; Force Plans Analyst for the Army Deputy Chief of Staff for Operations and Plans in the Pentagon; and Joint Staff Officer responsible for the Unified Command Plan in the J5, Joint Chiefs of Staff, also in the Pentagon. Additionally, he was a tank battalion Operations Officer in Korea and the Chief of Staff of 3rd Infantry Division in Würzburg, Germany.

== Personal life ==
Bell endorsed Republican presidential nominee Donald Trump in 2016, and again in 2024.

10 March 2026, he sent a condolence message when General Lee Sang-hee passed away.

== Awards and decorations ==
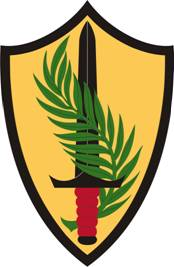
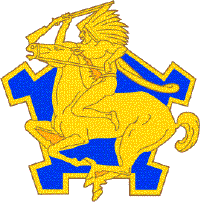
Ranger tab
Army Staff Identification Badge
United States Central Command Shoulder Sleeve Insignia
9th Cavalry Regiment Distinctive Unit Insignia

Defense Distinguished Service Medal with one bronze oak leaf cluster
Army Distinguished Service Medal
Defense Superior Service Medal
Legion of Merit with four oak leaf clusters
Bronze Star Medal
Meritorious Service Medal with one oak leaf cluster
Army Commendation Medal with two oak leaf clusters
Joint Meritorious Unit Award with oak leaf cluster
Army Superior Unit Award
National Defense Service Medal with two bronze service stars
Southwest Asia Service Medal with three service stars
Global War on Terrorism Service Medal
Korea Defense Service Medal
Armed Forces Service Medal with one service star
Army Service Ribbon
Army Overseas Service Ribbon with bronze award numeral 5
NATO Meritorious Service Medal
NATO Medal for Former Yugoslavia
Polish Army Medal in gold
Crosses of Military Merit, White Grand Cross (Spain)
Order of Merit of the Federal Republic of Germany, Knight Commander's Cross
Order of National Security Merit, Tong-il Medal
Cross of Naval Merit (Spain) with yellow decoration (con distantivo amarillo)
Kuwait Liberation Medal (Saudi Arabia)
Kuwait Liberation Medal (Kuwait)

Military offices
Preceded by Montgomery C. Meigs	Commanding General of United States Army Europe; 2002–2005	Succeeded by David D. McKiernan
Preceded by Leon J. LaPorte	Commander of United Nations Command; Commander of United States Forces Korea; Commander of ROK/US Combined Forces Command; 2006–2008	Succeeded by Walter L. Sharp
