= Thomas A. Schwartz =

United States Army general

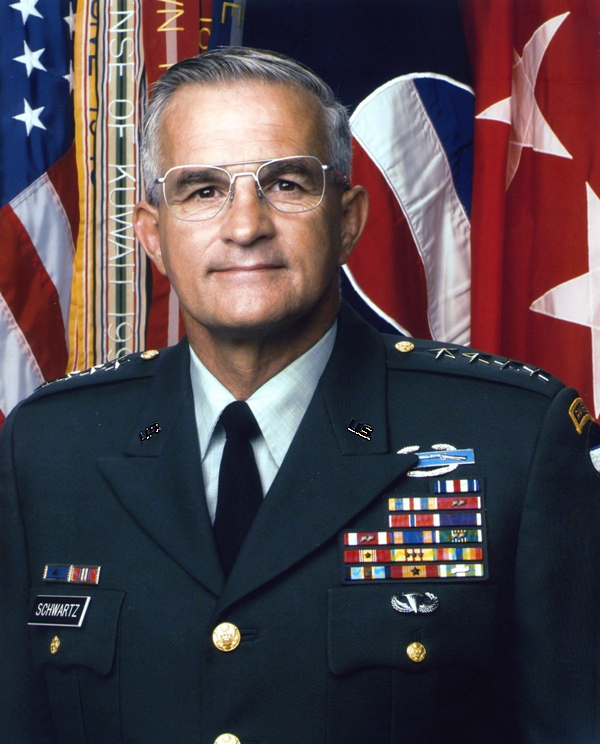
- As Commander of the United States Army Forces Command
- Born: 7 March 1945 (age 81); St. Paul, Minnesota, U.S.
- Military career
- Allegiance: United States
- Branch: United States Army
- Service years: 1967–2002
- Rank: General
- Nickname: Tom
- Commands: United States Forces Korea; United States Army Forces Command; III Corps; 4th Infantry Division
- Conflicts: Vietnam War
- Awards: Army Distinguished Service Medal; Silver Star; Defense Superior Service Medal; Legion of Merit (3); Bronze Star Medal; Purple Heart
- Other work: Chairman, Military Child Education Coalition board of directors

Thomas Allen Schwartz (born 7 March 1945) is a retired United States Army four-star general who commanded the United States Army Forces Command from 1998 to 1999 and United States Forces Korea from 1999 to 2002.

== Early life and education ==
Schwartz was born on 7 March 1945, in St. Paul, Minnesota. He attended Cretin High School (now Cretin-Derham Hall High School) in Saint Paul, Minnesota. While there, Schwartz was in the school’s Junior Reserve Officers' Training Corps and was the school’s 46th cadet colonel in 1963.

== Military career ==
Schwartz was commissioned in the infantry following graduation from the United States Military Academy in 1967. He served as a platoon leader and company commander with the 2nd Battalion, 505th Infantry in Vietnam from August 1968 to October 1969, earning both a Silver Star and a Purple Heart. In addition to Forces Command and United States Forces Korea, Schwartz also commanded III Corps and the 4th Infantry Division from October 1993 to November 1995.

Schwartz holds master's degrees from Duke University and the Naval War College. He is also a graduate of the Infantry Officer Basic Course, Ranger School, the Armor Officer Advanced Course, and the Armed Forces Staff College.

== Awards and decorations ==
Combat Infantryman Badge
Ranger tab
Basic Parachutist Badge
82nd Airborne Division Combat Service Identification Badge

Army Distinguished Service Medal
Silver Star
Defense Superior Service Medal
Legion of Merit with two bronze oak leaf clusters
Bronze Star Medal
Purple Heart
Meritorious Service Medal with two oak leaf clusters
Air Medal
Army Commendation Medal with two oak leaf clusters
Army Presidential Unit Citation with oak leaf cluster
Valorous Unit Award
National Defense Service Medal with two bronze service stars
Vietnam Service Medal with three service stars
Army Service Ribbon
Army Overseas Service Ribbon with bronze award numeral 2
Vietnam Gallantry Cross with bronze star
Vietnam Campaign Medal

He received an honorary Doctor of Laws degree from the University of Maryland University College in 2002.

== Post-military ==
In 2004, Schwartz became chairman of the board of directors of the Military Child Education Coalition an organization co-founded by his wife Sandy and other military spouses. He sits on the advisory board of Azbell Electronics.
