= John A. Wickham Jr. =

United States Army general (1928–2024)

John A. Wickham
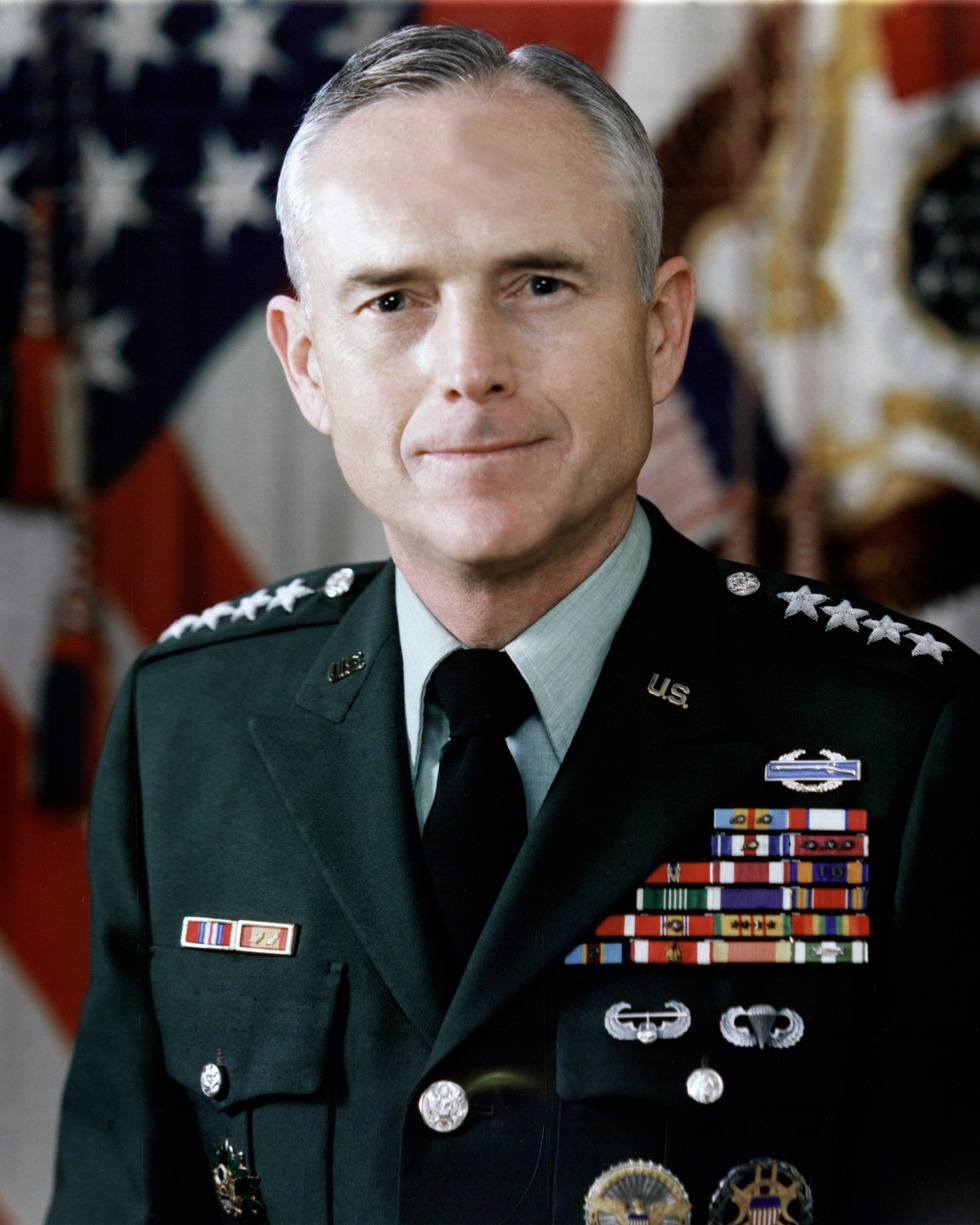
- Wickham in August 1988
- Born: 25 June 1928; Dobbs Ferry, New York, U.S.
- Died: 11 May 2024 (aged 95); Oro Valley, Arizona, U.S.
- Burial place: West Point Cemetery, West Point, New York, U.S.
- Military career
- Allegiance: United States
- Branch: United States Army
- Service years: 1950–1987
- Rank: General
- Commands: Chief of Staff of the United States Army; Eighth Army; United States Forces Korea; United Nations Command; 101st Airborne Division; 1st Brigade, 3rd Infantry Division; 5th Battalion, 7th Cavalry Regiment
- Conflicts: Vietnam War
- Awards: Defense Distinguished Service Medal (4); Army Distinguished Service Medal (2); Navy Distinguished Service Medal; Air Force Distinguished Service Medal; Silver Star (2); Legion of Merit (4); Bronze Star Medal

John Adams Wickham Jr. (25 June 1928 – 11 May 2024) was a United States Army general who served as the United States Army Chief of Staff from 1983 to 1987.

== Early life and education ==
Wickham was born on 25 June 1928, in Dobbs Ferry, New York. He graduated from the United States Military Academy in 1950, where he later served as a social sciences instructor, from 1956 to 1960.

== Military career ==
Upon graduation from the Military Academy in 1950, Wickham was commissioned a second lieutenant and assigned to the 18th Infantry Regiment and then the 6th Infantry Regiment in West Berlin. He served as a platoon leader and company executive officer in the 511th Airborne Infantry Regiment and served as an aide-de-camp to the commander in the 37th Infantry Division and 10th Infantry Division. He received master's degrees in economics and government from Harvard University and was a graduate of the National War College and Armed Forces Staff College.

Wickham then served as operations officer of the 1st Battle Group, 5th Cavalry Regiment, in South Korea, and was executive officer to Chief of Staff of the United States Army, General Harold Johnson. Later he commanded in combat the 5th Battalion, 7th Cavalry Regiment, 1st Cavalry Division in South Vietnam, where he was seriously wounded by a satchel charge explosive. He made his way to a foxhole and continued to command his men. On his way there he was hit 15 times by AK-47 fire. The NVA eventual called off the attack. Wickham was put up for the Distinguished Service Cross but received the Silver Star for his actions that day. Wickham spent over a year in the hospital recovering. He later commanded the 1st Brigade, 3rd Infantry Division in West Germany.

Wickham returned to South Vietnam as the Deputy Chief of Staff, Military Assistance Command, Vietnam. He then commanded the 101st Airborne Division, was director of the Joint Staff of the Joint Chiefs of Staff, and afterward, as a four-star general, became Commander in Chief of the United Nations Command and Commander of the United States Forces Korea and Eighth Army in South Korea.

In 1979, Wickham played a leading role in calming political tensions after the assassination of South Korean President Park Chung Hee, and wrote a book Korea on the Brink about the dangerous period. He also served as senior military assistant to Secretaries of Defense James R. Schlesinger and Donald Rumsfeld. In 1983, president Ronald Reagan appointed Wickham Chief of Staff of the United States Army, the last Korean War-era veteran to be named to the post.

== Role in Gwangju Massacre ==
After Chun Doo-hwan seized control of South Korea in a military coup following the 1979 assassination of South Korean president Park Chung Hee, nationwide pro-democracy protests erupted. Appalled by the brutal repression of student protests at Chonnam National University in Gwangju, protests escalated to the level of city-wide uprising. Martial law forces responded by escalating the violence, opening fire on unarmed protesters. On 20 May, the same day that special-forces paratroopers shot protesters near Gwangju station, Wickham received a request from the ruling military junta to transfer OPCON for the ROK Army 20th division. After consultation with US ambassador William H. Gleysteen and colleagues in Washington, Wickham approved the OPCON transfer. By 2230 hours on the same evening, elements of the 20th division had already been moved to Gwangju. The next day, the violence escalated, including indiscriminate firing on civilians from helicopters. By 27 May, the 20th division, along with four other divisions, had been used to re-take the city in a large-scale military assault leading to numerous civilian deaths and casualties. When asked to testify about the massacre in 1989 for the South Korean National Assembly, Wickham maintained that he had no way not to approve of the OPCON transfer. Many Koreans believe, however, that his response to the notification of OPCON transfer amounted to a tacit approval of the massacre, despite the 20th Division being a South Korean military formation and not a formation of the United States of America.

== Later work ==
Wickham retired from the United States Army in 1987 after 37 years of active service. He was twice awarded the Silver Star for battlefield valor, as well as the Bronze Star Medal for valor, the Purple Heart, ten Air Medals, four Legions of Merit, four Defense Distinguished Service Medals, two Army Distinguished Service Medals, a Navy Distinguished Service Medal and Air Force Distinguished Service Medal, the Combat Infantryman Badge, Expert Infantryman Badge, Parachutist Badge, and 21 foreign decorations, including the Republic of Korea's highest military decoration. He was named by Army Times as one of the ten leaders who most changed the United States Army. The Association of Graduates United States Military Academy presented him with the Distinguished Graduate Award in 2005, and he received the Infantry Doughboy Award in 2006.

Wickham served as Town Council President in Sun City, Arizona and as an elder at Saint Andrews Presbyterian Church in Tucson, Arizona. He served as chairman of the board for Honeywell Federal Systems and Nortel Federal Systems, and as director of several other corporations. He was named vice chairman for the United States-China National Committee and has served as a member of the Secretary of Defense Policy Board. He is also active in the United Way, and a member of the Alfalfa Club, and Council on Foreign Relations. For the past 20 years he continues as the Military and Foreign Affairs speaker on The Buckmaster Show, KVOI radio in Tucson, Arizona. In his autobiography My American Journey, General Colin Powell mentioned serving with Wickham and praised him as "every inch a Soldier".

Wickham died in Oro Valley, Arizona, on 11 May 2024, at the age of 95.

== Awards and decorations ==
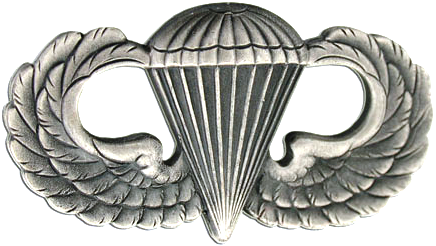

Defense Distinguished Service Medal with three bronze oak leaf clusters
Army Distinguished Service Medal with oak leaf cluster
Navy Distinguished Service Medal
Air Force Distinguished Service Medal
Silver Star with oak leaf cluster
Legion of Merit with three oak leaf clusters
Bronze Star Medal with "V" Device
Meritorious Service Medal
Air Medal (10 awards)
Army Commendation Medal
Purple Heart
Valorous Unit Award
World War II Victory Medal
Army of Occupation Medal
National Defense Service Medal with oak leaf cluster
Vietnam Service Medal with eight Service stars
Army Service Ribbon
Army Overseas Service Ribbon with bronze award numeral 2
Republic of Korea Taeguk Medal
National Order of Vietnam Knight's degree
Vietnam Gallantry Cross Unit Citation (two awards)
Vietnam Campaign Medal

Military offices
Preceded by John William Vessey Jr.	Vice Chief of Staff of the United States Army; 1982–1983	Succeeded by Maxwell R. Thurman
Preceded by Edward C. Meyer	Chief of Staff of the United States Army; 1983–1987	Succeeded by Carl E. Vuono
