= Walter L. Sharp =

US Army general

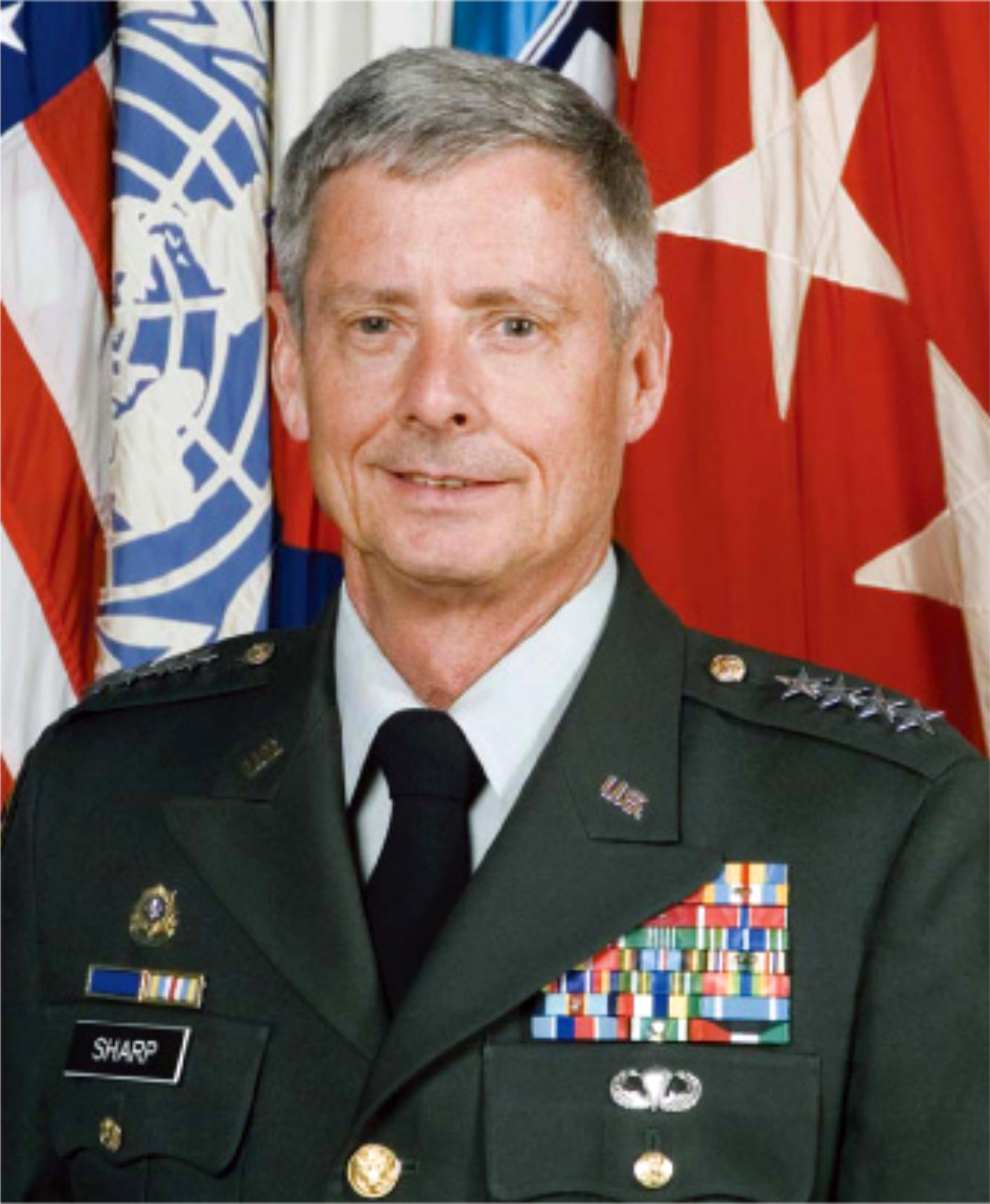
- Born: 27 September 1952 (age 74); Morgantown, West Virginia, U.S.
- Military career
- Allegiance: United States
- Branch: United States Army
- Service years: 1974–2011
- Rank: General
- Nickname: Skip
- Commands: United Nations Command; ROK-US Combined Forces Command; U.S. Forces Korea; 3rd Infantry Division; 2nd Stryker Cavalry Regiment
- Conflicts: Operation Desert Shield; Operation Desert Storm; Operation Southern Watch; Operation Uphold Democracy
- Awards: Defense Distinguished Service Medal (2); Distinguished Service Medal (2); Defense Superior Service Medal; Legion of Merit; Bronze Star

Walter Lawrence "Skip" Sharp (born 27 September 1952), is a retired United States Army four-star general, who last served as the Commander, United Nations Command, Commander, ROK-US Combined Forces Command and Commander, U.S. Forces Korea from June 2008 to July 2011. He previously served as the Director of the Joint Staff from 2005 to June 2008. Sharp retired from the Army in July 2011.

== Biography ==
General Sharp was born in Morgantown, West Virginia while his father was fighting in the Korean War. As a child he moved among many cavalry posts until he went to the United States Military Academy in 1970. General Sharp graduated from West Point in 1974 and was commissioned an Armor officer. In his class were three other future four-star generals, David Petraeus, Martin Dempsey and Keith B. Alexander. He has earned a Master of Science degree in Operations Research and System Analysis from Rensselaer Polytechnic Institute; and is a graduate of the Armor Basic Course, the Field Artillery Advanced Course, the Command and General Staff College, and the Army War College.

General Sharp's command positions include Armor Company Commander with 1st Battalion, 67th Armor, 2nd Armored Division, Fort Hood, Texas; Squadron Commander 1st Squadron, 7th U.S. Cavalry, 1st Cavalry Division, Fort Hood Texas; Regimental Commander 2nd Armored Cavalry Regiment, Fort Polk, Louisiana; Assistant Division Commander for Maneuver 2nd Infantry Division, Camp Red Cloud, South Korea; and Division Commander, 3rd Infantry Division, Fort Stewart, Georgia. He commanded troops in Desert Shield and Desert Storm, Operation Uphold Democracy in Haiti, and SFOR's Multinational Division (North) in Bosnia.

General Sharp has served in the Directorate of Combat Developments at Fort Knox, Kentucky, the Armor/Anti-Armor Special Task Force, and the Armored System Modernization Office at the Pentagon. He has had four assignments at the Pentagon on the Joint Staff. He was the deputy director, J5 for Western Hemisphere/Global Transnational Issues; the vice director, J8 for Force Structure, Resources, and Assessment; the director for Strategic Plans and Policy, J5; and the director of the Joint Staff.

General Sharp is married to the former Joanne R. Caporaso of Brooklyn, New York, and they have three children.

== Decorations, medals and badges ==
Basic Parachutist Badge
Joint Chiefs of Staff Identification Badge
Army Staff Identification Badge
1st Cavalry Division Combat Service Identification Badge
2nd Cavalry Regiment Distinctive Unit Insignia

Defense Distinguished Service Medal (with one bronze oak leaf cluster)
Army Distinguished Service Medal (with one bronze oak leaf cluster)
Defense Superior Service Medal (with one bronze oak leaf cluster)
Legion of Merit
Bronze Star
Meritorious Service Medal (with one oak leaf cluster)
Army Commendation Medal
Army Achievement Medal
Presidential Unit Citation
Joint Meritorious Unit Award
National Defense Service Medal (with two bronze Service Stars)
Armed Forces Expeditionary Medal
Southwest Asia Service Medal (with 2 Service Stars)
Global War on Terrorism Service Medal
Korea Defense Service Medal
Army Service Ribbon
Army Overseas Service Ribbon with bronze award numeral 2
United Nations Medal with one service star
Inter-American Defense Board Medal
Order of National Security Merit, Tong-il Medal (Republic of Korea)
Order of National Security Merit, Cheon-su Medal (Republic of Korea)
Kuwait Liberation Medal (Saudi Arabia)
Kuwait Liberation Medal (Kuwait)

== See also ==
Military offices
Preceded by Burwell B. Bell III	Commander of United Nations Command; Commander of United States Forces Korea; Commander of ROK/US Combined Forces Command; 2008–2011	Succeeded by James D. Thurman
