= Louis C. Menetrey =

United States Army general

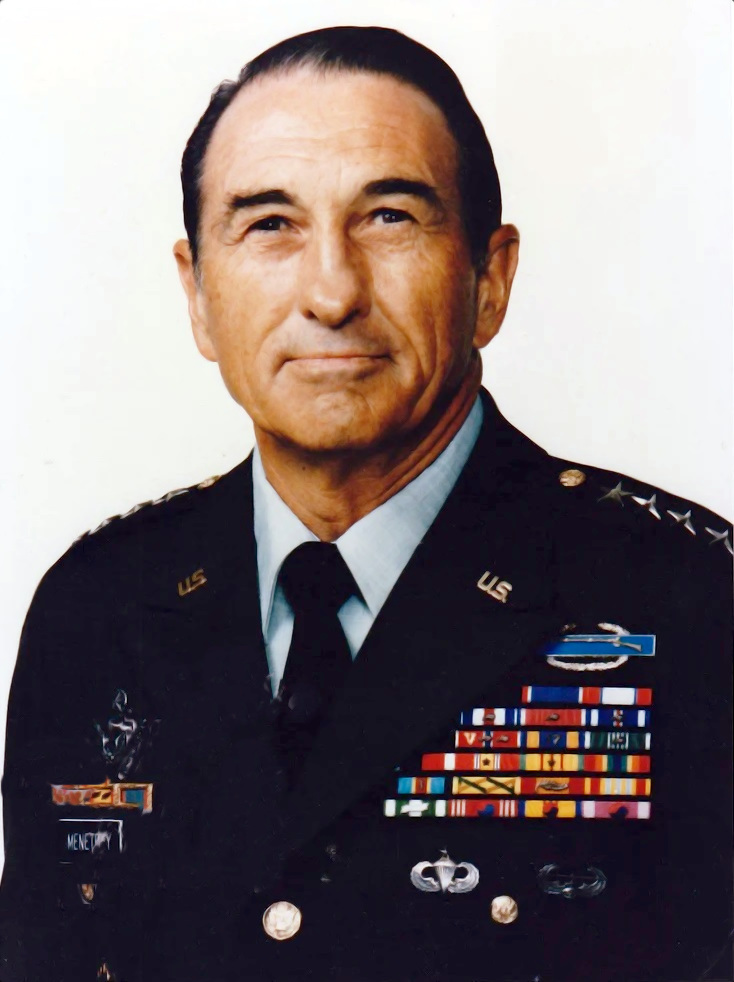
- Menetrey as commander of U.S. forces in South Korea, circa 1990
- Born: 19 August 1929; Hollywood, California
- Died: 14 January 2009 (aged 79); Niceville, Florida
- Military career
- Allegiance: United States
- Branch: United States Army
- Service years: 1953–1990
- Rank: General
- Commands: U.N. Command/U.S. Forces Korea/Eighth Army; Fifth Army; 4th Infantry Division
- Conflicts: Vietnam War
- Awards: Distinguished Service Cross; Army Distinguished Service Medal with OLC; Silver Star with OLC; Legion of Merit with OLC
- Other work: consultant

Louis Charles Menetrey (29 August 1929 – 14 January 2009) was a United States Army four-star general who served as commander in chief, United Nations Command and commander in chief, ROK/U.S. Combined Forces Command/Commander, United States Forces Korea/Commanding General, Eighth United States Army (CINCUNC/CINCCFC/COMUSFK/CG EUSA) from 1987 to 1990.

== Military career ==
Menetrey was born on 19 August 1929, in Hollywood, California, to a Swiss immigrant father and American mother. After graduating from Hollywood High School, he enrolled in the University of California, Los Angeles, graduating with a Bachelor of Arts degree in political science. While in college, he served in both the Navy and Army Reserve. He was commissioned in 1953 in the infantry.

After completing the Infantry Basic course and Airborne and Ranger school, he served as a platoon leader, and later commanded four different companies; most officers only command a company once. During this time he also served as a nuclear weapons test and evaluation officer and as a liaison officer involved in the planning for an invasion of Cuba.

After promotion to major, he attended the Command and General Staff College, then went to Georgetown University and received a master's degree in International Affairs before being sent to the Armed Forces Staff College. Upon graduation he was chosen for early promotion to lieutenant colonel and received orders to Vietnam.

In Vietnam, his first assignment was as deputy chief of staff of the 1st Cavalry Division, and then on 18 October 1967 was given command of the 2nd Battalion, 28th Infantry, a unit that had been badly mauled in the Battle of Ong Thanh. During this assignment, Menetrey received the Distinguished Service Cross for heroism against Viet Cong forces near Bến Cát. In addition, during his time as battalion commander he received two awards of the Silver Star and an award of the Legion of Merit.

After Vietnam, he attended the National War College, and then was assigned to the Office of the Coordinator of Army Studies, working for Vice Chief of Staff General William E. DePuy, and assisting in developing policies for transition to an all volunteer force.

He was assigned next to the 101st Airborne Division as the G-3, then took command of the division's 2nd Brigade. While at Fort Campbell, he was selected for flag rank. His first assignment as a general officer was as assistant division commander, 2nd Infantry Division, and during his time in that billet, the Axe Murder Incident, where U.S. Army officers were slain at Panmunjom, occurred.

His next assignment was as deputy commander, Combined Arms Development Agency, where he helped lay the groundwork for the National Training Center. He was then picked for command of the 4th Infantry Division, followed by being Director of Requirements for the Army Staff.

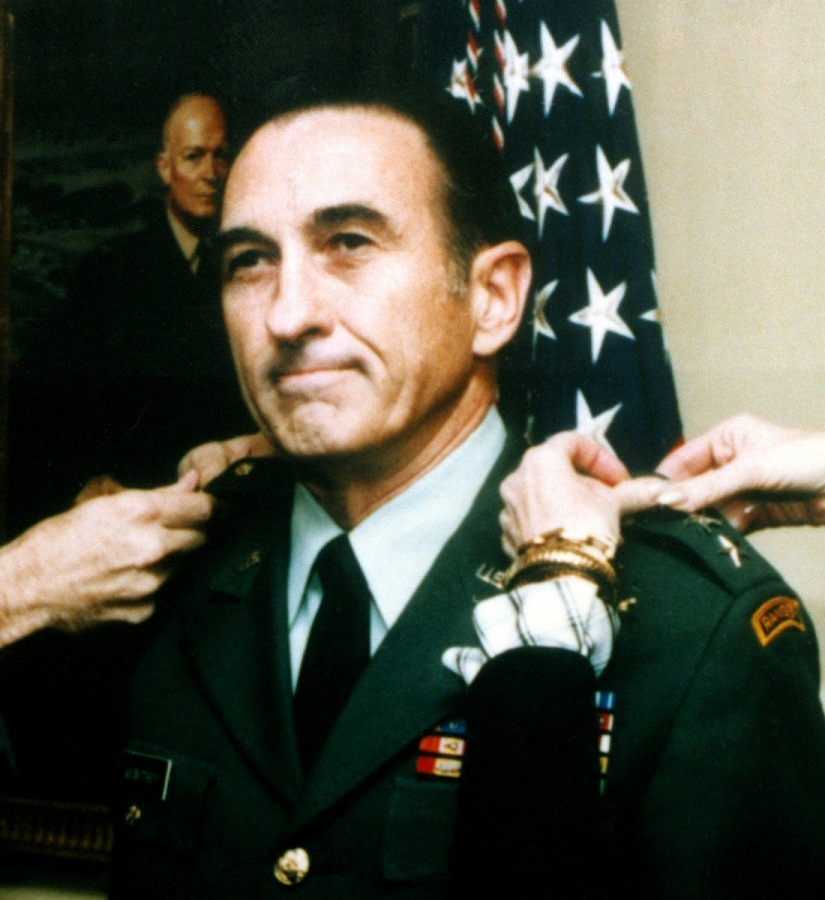
Menetrey is promoted to lieutenant general in 1982

He was chosen to command the Combined Field Army in Korea, and then the Fifth United States Army, headquartered at Fort Sam Houston. He received his fourth star in 1987, and took command of all U.S. forces in Korea.

== Post military career ==
Menetrey retired from the army in 1990, living between Colorado Springs, Colorado, and Marathon, Florida. He worked as a consultant. Menetrey died on 14 January 2009, after an extended battle with Alzheimer's disease. He was survived by his wife, and was buried at Arlington National Cemetery with full military honors.
