= Leon J. LaPorte =

United States Army general

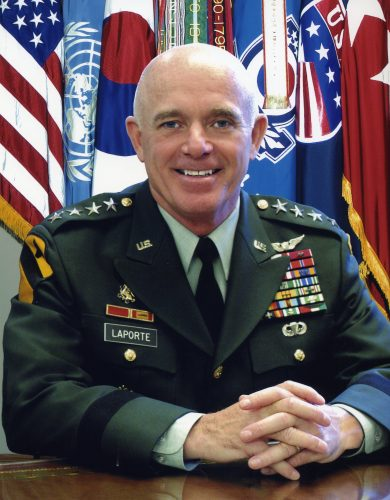
- General LaPorte as Commander, United Nations Command, ROK-US Combined Forces Command and United States Forces Korea
- Born: 5 May 1946 (age 80); Providence, Rhode Island, U.S.
- Military career
- Allegiance: United States of America
- Branch: United States Army
- Service years: 1968–2006
- Rank: General
- Commands: U.S. Forces Korea; III Corps; 1st Cavalry Division
- Conflicts: Vietnam War; Gulf War
- Awards: Distinguished Service Medal; Legion of Merit (3); Distinguished Flying Cross; Bronze Star; Meritorious Service Medal (4); Air Medal (With Valor Device); Army Commendation Medal (With Valor Device)

Leon J. LaPorte (born 5 May 1946) is a retired United States Army general who served as Commander, 1st Cavalry Division from 1995 through 1997 and as Commander, United States Forces Korea until 2006.

== Career ==
LaPorte graduated from the University of Rhode Island with a B.A. degree in biology in 1968 and was commissioned a Second Lieutenant in the U.S. Army as an Armor Officer. From 1969 until 1970 he served with the 3rd Infantry Division, in 1971 he transferred to the 238th Aerial Weapons Company in the Republic of Vietnam. In 1977 he received his M.S. degree in Administration from the University of California, Irvine. From 1977 until 1980 he was an assistant professor at the United States Military Academy. In October 1990 as the Chief of Staff, 1st Cavalry Division he deployed as part of Operation Desert Shield and Desert Storm. He returned in 1995 to command the 1st Cavalry Division until 1997. From February 2003 until February 2006 he was commander of United States Forces Korea (USFK) and United Nations Forces, Korea. In February he retired from the Army after 38 years of service, handing command to U.S. Army General Burwell B. Bell III.

LaPorte played a major part in an investigation of the involvement U.S. military personnel in hiring prostitutes and facilitating human trafficking in South Korea. Laporte gave an apology to the families of the two South Korean junior high-school girls that were accidentally run over and killed by a U.S. armored vehicle in 2002.

== Awards and decorations ==
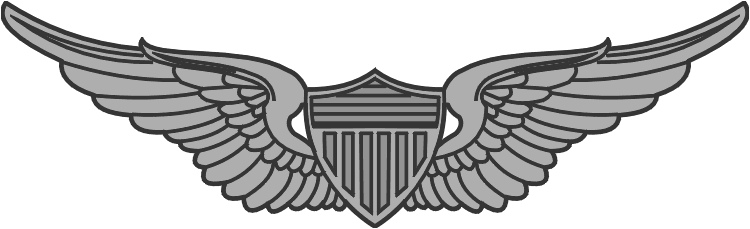
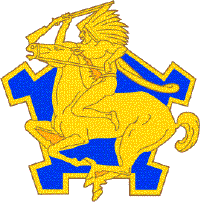
Army Basic Aviator Badge
Ranger tab
Basic Parachutist Badge
Army Staff Identification Badge
United Nations Command Badge
1st Cavalry Division Combat Service Identification Badge
9th Cavalry Regiment Distinctive Unit Insignia

Defense Distinguished Service Medal
Army Distinguished Service Medal
Legion of Merit with two bronze oak leaf clusters
Distinguished Flying Cross
Bronze Star
Meritorious Service Medal with two oak leaf clusters
Air Medal with "V" device and bronze award numeral 9
Army Commendation Medal with "V" device
Army Achievement Medal
Meritorious Unit Commendation
National Defense Service Medal with two bronze service stars
Vietnam Service Medal with three service stars
Southwest Asia Service Medal with three service stars
Global War on Terrorism Service Medal
Armed Forces Service Medal
Army Service Ribbon
Army Overseas Service Ribbon with award numeral 2
Bundeswehr Cross of Honor in Silver (Republic of Germany)
Order of National Security Merit, Tong-il Medal (Republic of Korea)
Vietnam Gallantry Cross Unit Citation
Vietnam Campaign Medal
Kuwait Liberation Medal (Saudi Arabia)
Kuwait Liberation Medal (Kuwait)

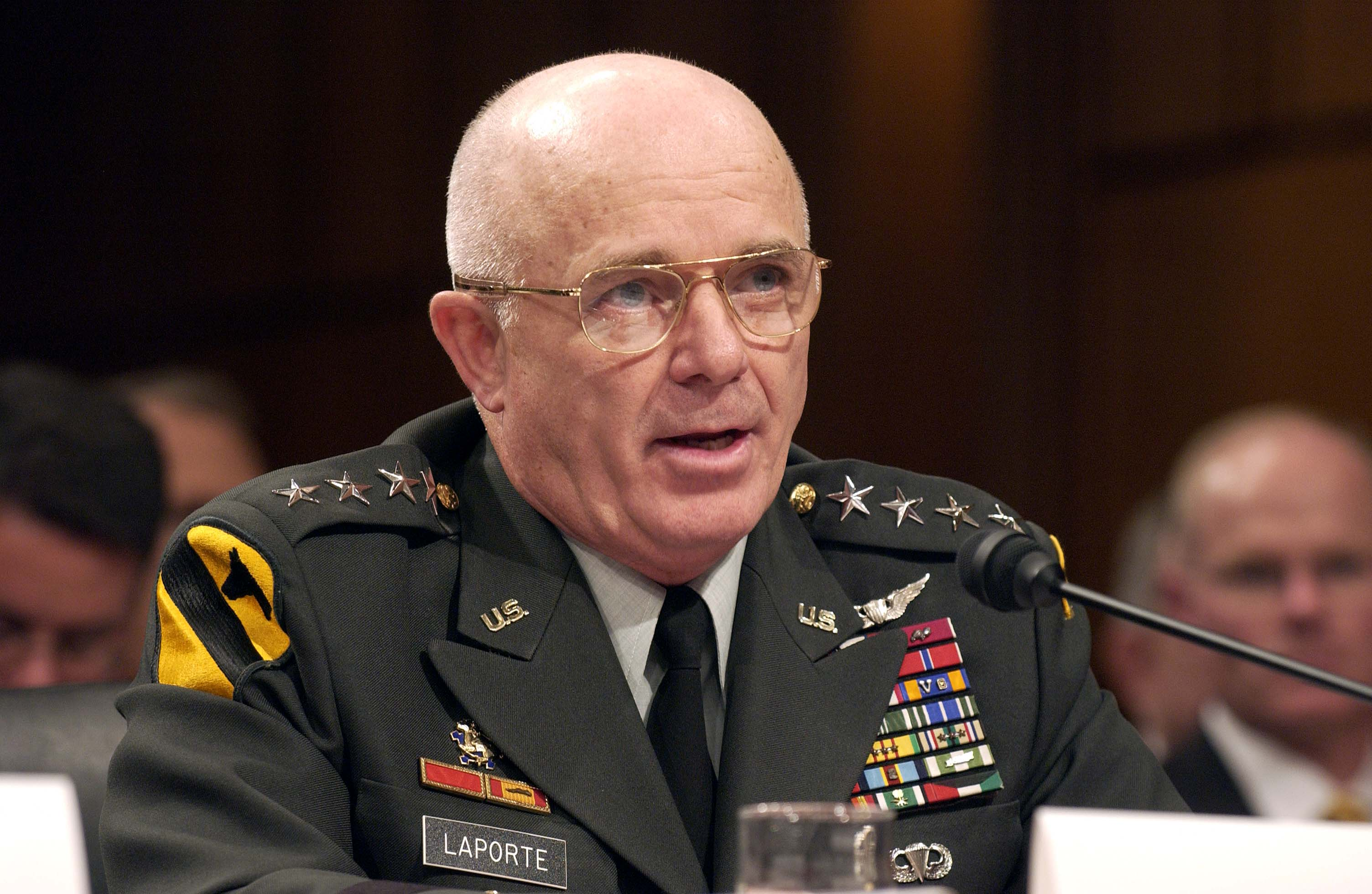
LaPorte before the Senate Armed Services Committee on 23 September 2004
