= Robert W. Sennewald =

U.S. Army general (1929–2023)

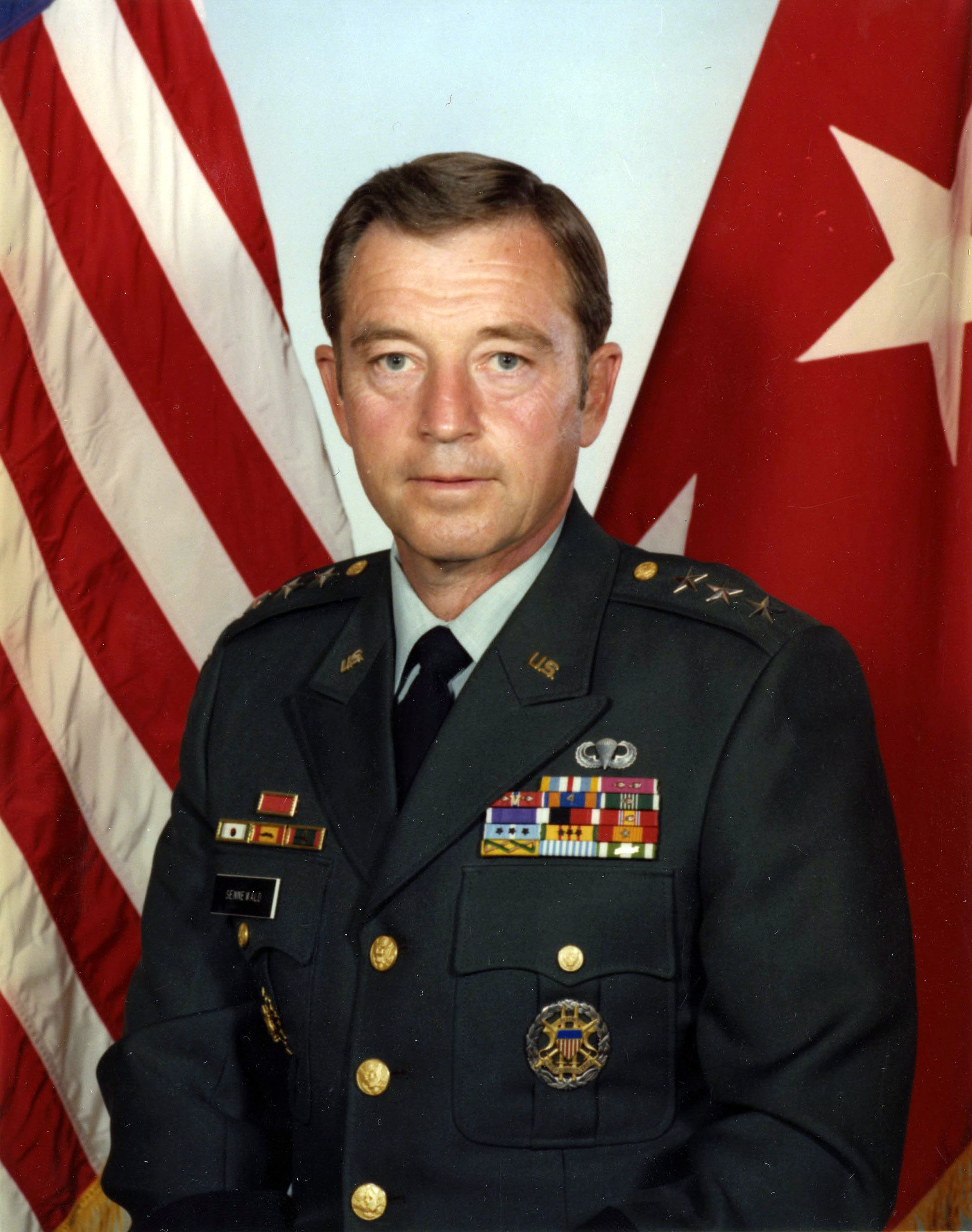
- Sennewald as a lieutenant general in 1981
- Born: 21 November 1929; St. Louis, Missouri, U.S.
- Died: 17 March 2023 (aged 93) Fort Belvoir, Virginia, U.S.
- Buried: Arlington National Cemetery
- Allegiance: United States
- Branch: United States Army
- Service years: 1951–1986
- Rank: General
- Commands: United States Army Forces Command; United Nations Command; Eighth United States Army; 6th Battalion, 15th Artillery Regiment
- Conflicts: Korean War; Vietnam War
- Awards: Defense Distinguished Service Medal; Army Distinguished Service Medal; Defense Superior Service Medal; Legion of Merit (3); Bronze Star Medal (3)
- Spouses: Nancy Vance Sennewald; Susan Horne
- Children: 3
- Other work: Consultant

Robert William Sennewald (21 November 1929 – 17 March 2023) was a United States Army general.

== Early life and education ==
Sennewald was born on 21 November 1929, in St. Louis, Missouri as the only child of Ferdinand and Mabel Sennewald. He was commissioned in 1951 through the Reserve Officer Training Corps upon graduation from Iowa State University with a degree in physical education. While at Iowa State he was affiliated with Phi Kappa Psi fraternity. Sennewald is an Iowa State University Distinguished Alumni Award winner.

== Military career ==
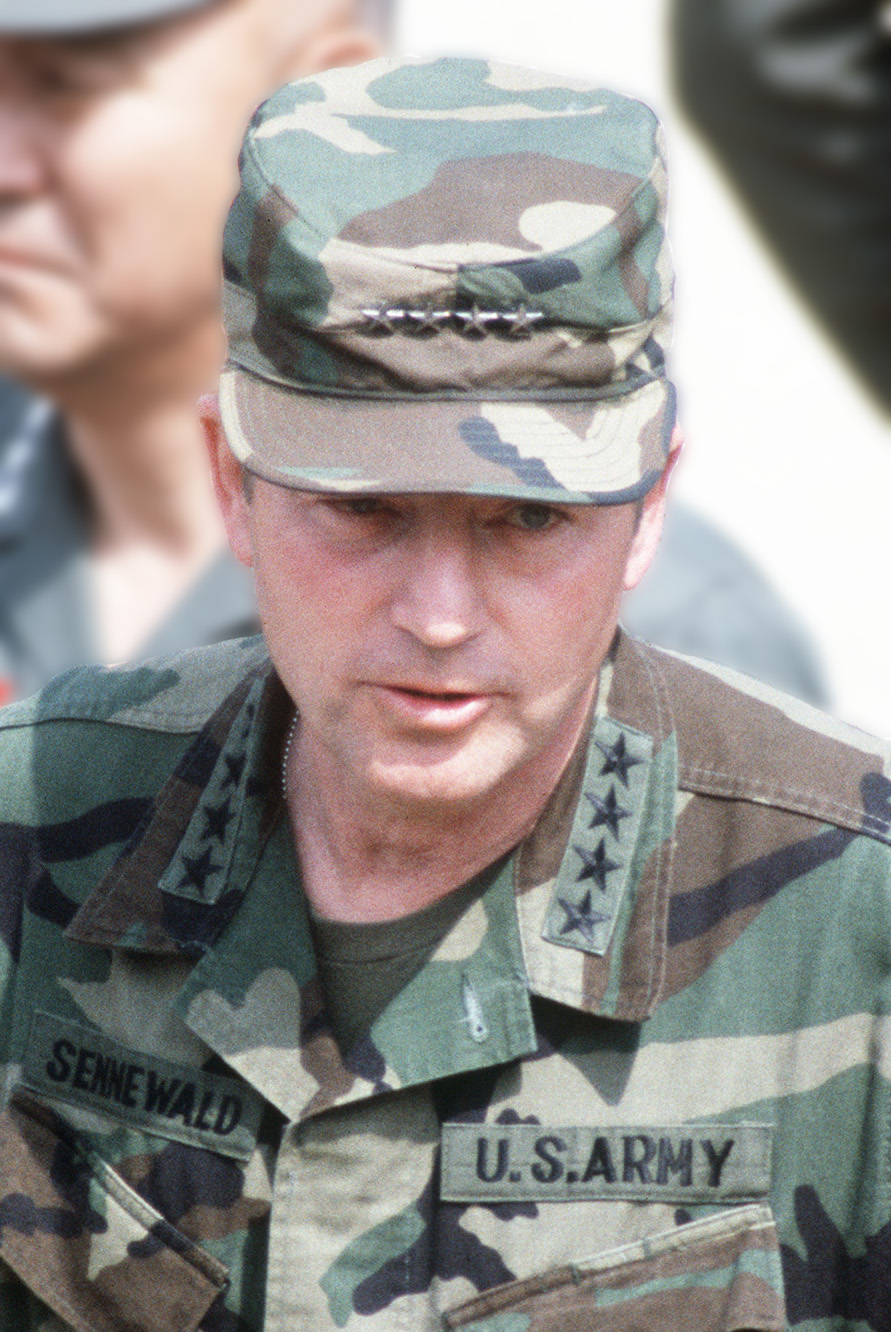
Sennewald at Nightmare Range, South Korea in 1984

Sennewald's assignments included command of: 6th Battalion, 15th Artillery Regiment in Vietnam; Division Artillery, 4th Infantry Division (Mechanized) at Fort Carson, Colorado; and the United States Army Training Center at Fort Dix, New Jersey. He also served as Assistant Chief of Operations (C3/J3) for the ROK/US Forces in Korea, and Deputy Commander, United States Pacific Command.

Sennewald served as Commander in Chief, United Nations Command/Commander in Chief, ROK/U.S. Combined Forces Command/Commander, United States Forces Korea/Commanding General, Eighth United States Army (CINCUNC/CINCCFC/COMUSFK/CG EUSA) from 1982 to 1984; and as Commanding General, United States Army Forces Command from 1984 to 1986. Sennewald was promoted to four star rank on 24 May 1982.

Sennewald retired from the United States Army in 1986. In 1994, he established Sennewald Associates which does consulting work on national security issues, and has served as Chairman of the Army and Air Force Mutual Aid Association, on the board of the Armed Services YMCA, and on the Advisory Council of the United States Field Artillery Association. He died on 17 March 2023, at the age of 93.

== See also ==
- List of United States Army four-star generals
