= John H. Tilelli Jr. =

United States Army general (born 1941)

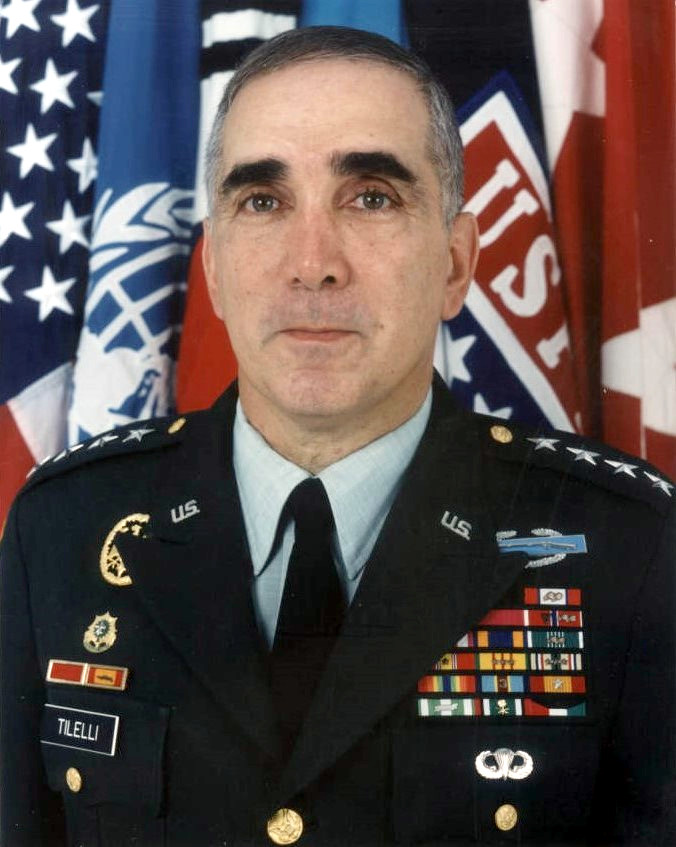
- Tilelli in 1996
- Born: 2 October 1941 (age 85); Brooklyn, New York, U.S.
- Military career
- Allegiance: United States
- Branch: United States Army
- Service years: 1963–2000
- Rank: General
- Commands: United States Army Forces Command; United Nations Command; United States Forces Korea; 1st Cavalry Division; 2nd Armored Cavalry Regiment
- Conflicts: Vietnam War; Gulf War
- Awards: Defense Distinguished Service Medal; Army Distinguished Service Medal (4); Navy Distinguished Service Medal; Legion of Merit; Bronze Star Medal (3)
- Other work: President, USO; Operation Dark Winter

John Harold Tilelli Jr. (born 2 October 1941) is a retired United States Army four-star general who served as Vice Chief of Staff of the United States Army from 1994 to 1995; Commanding General, United States Army Forces Command from 1995 to 1996; and Commander in Chief, United Nations Command/Commander in Chief, ROK/United States Combined Forces Command/Commander, United States Forces Korea from 1996 to 1999. He retired from the United States Army on 31 January 2000, and later worked for the USO and The Aerospace Corporation.

== Early life and education ==
Tilelli was raised in Holmdel Township, New Jersey, and graduated in 1959 from Red Bank Catholic High School. He attended Pennsylvania Military College (since renamed as Widener University), graduating in 1963 with a degree in economics and was commissioned an armor officer. He earned a master's degree in administration from Lehigh University in 1972 and is a 1983 Army War College graduate. He also holds honorary doctorates in business management from Widener and in law from the University of Maryland.

== Military career ==
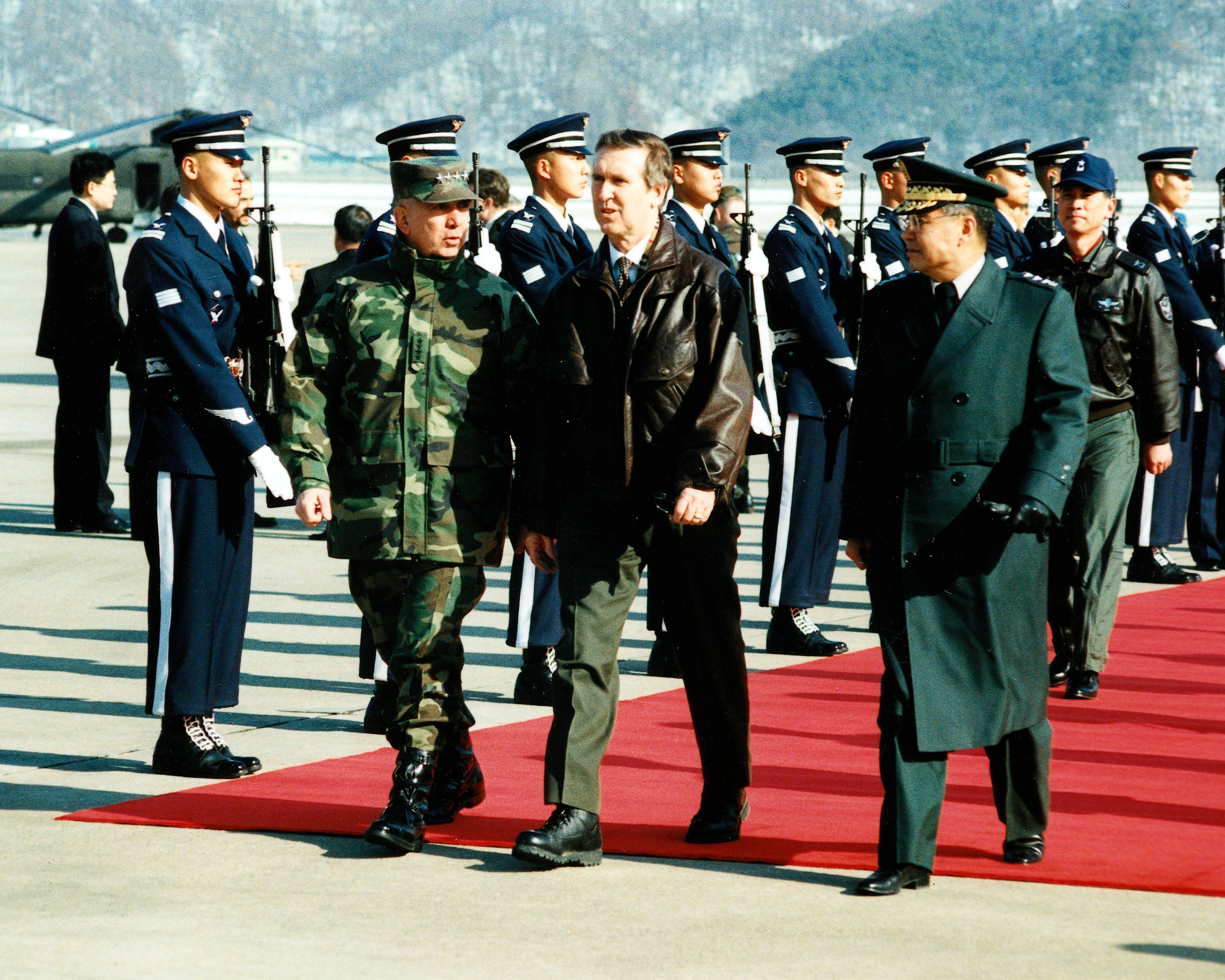
Tilelli, left, greeting Defense Secretary William Cohen during his arrival in South Korea in January 1998

Tilelli served two tours in the Vietnam War, four in Germany and three in the Pentagon. His combat tours include assignments as a company commander in Vietnam and as commander of the 1st Cavalry Division during the Gulf War.

== Awards and decorations ==
Tilelli's awards and decorations include the Defense Distinguished Service Medal, the Army Distinguished Service Medal with three Oak Leaf Clusters, the Navy Distinguished Service Medal, the Legion of Merit, the Bronze Star Medal with "V" Device and two Oak Leaf Clusters, Meritorious Service Medal with three Oak Leaf Clusters, Air Medal, Army Commendation Medal with two Oak Leaf Clusters, Combat Infantryman Badge, Parachutist Badge, Office of the Secretary of Defense Identification Badge, Joint Chiefs of Staff Identification Badge and Army Staff Identification Badge.

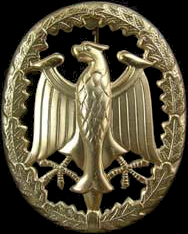

== Personal life ==
Since retiring, Tilelli has served as president of the United Service Organizations (USO). He was also elected to the board of trustees of The Aerospace Corporation, and sat on the board of directors of Raytheon until 4 May 2005. In 2006, he joined the board of directors for Xcelaero. From 2008 to 2014, he served on the board of directors of Military Officers Association of America (MOAA), including a two-year term as chairman of the board from 2012 to 2014.

== Notes ==
Military offices
Preceded by J. H. Binford Peay III	Vice Chief of Staff of the United States Army; 1994–1995	Succeeded by Ronald H. Griffith
