= Field Artillery Brigade =

Components of the United States Army

Field Artillery Brigades are field artillery and rocket formations of the United States Army. They were previously named Fires Brigades for a short period. Fires Brigades were then either inactivated and reflagged as Division Artillery (DIVARTY) or reorganized and redesignated as Field Artillery Brigades. Currently active Field Artillery Brigades are:

Active duty artillery brigades:

- 17th Field Artillery Brigade, artillery brigade of I Corps
- 18th Field Artillery Brigade, artillery brigade of XVIII Airborne Corps
- 41st Field Artillery Brigade, artillery brigade of United States Army Europe and Africa
- 75th Field Artillery Brigade, artillery brigade of III Armored Corps
- 210th Field Artillery Brigade, artillery brigade of Eighth United States Army

National Guard artillery brigades:

- 45th Field Artillery Brigade (Oklahoma Army National Guard)
- 65th Field Artillery Brigade (Utah ARNG)
- 115th Field Artillery Brigade (Wyoming Army National Guard)
- 130th Field Artillery Brigade (Kansas ARNG)
- 138th Field Artillery Brigade (Kentucky ARNG)
- 142nd Field Artillery Brigade (Arkansas ARNG)
- 169th Field Artillery Brigade (Colorado Army National Guard)
- 197th Field Artillery Brigade (New Hampshire ARNG)

Army Reserve artillery brigades:

- 402nd Field Artillery Brigade

Former field artillery brigades:

- 42nd Fires Brigade, reflagged to 3rd Infantry Division Artillery
- 51st Field Artillery Brigade, 26th Division, First World War. Charles L. Phillips commanded the brigade.
- 52nd Field Artillery Brigade, 27th Division, First World War
- 53rd Field Artillery Brigade, 28th Division, 1917-18
- 54th Field Artillery Brigade (Virginia Army National Guard, 329th Regional Support Group traces its origins to this headquarters)
- 56th Field Artillery Brigade (1972–1986), equipped with the Pershing II missile now the 56th Artillery Command
- 57th Field Artillery Brigade (Wisconsin Army National Guard)
- 103rd Field Artillery Brigade (Providence, Rhode Island National Guard), disestablished 2008
- 113th Field Artillery Brigade (North Carolina National Guard)
- 118th Field Artillery Brigade (Georgia National Guard)
- 135th Field Artillery Brigade (Missouri Army National Guard)
- 141st Field Artillery Brigade, Alabama Army National Guard, formed from elements 141st Field Artillery, became XIX Corps Artillery
- 147th Field Artillery Brigade (South Dakota National Guard), reflagged to 196th Maneuver Enhancement Brigade
- 151st Field Artillery Brigade
- 153rd Field Artillery Brigade (Arizona National Guard)
- 196th Field Artillery Brigade (Chattanooga, Tennessee National Guard)
- 209th Field Artillery Brigade (New York National Guard)
- 212th Fires Brigade, reflagged to 1st Armored Division Artillery
- 214th Fires Brigade, reflagged to 4th Infantry Division Artillery
- 224th Field Artillery Brigade (Virginia Army National Guard)
- 227th Field Artillery Brigade (Florida Army National Guard), reorganized in 1988 as the 50th Support Group, now 50th Regional Support Group
- 631st Field Artillery Brigade (Kansas National Guard

== See also ==
- Reorganization plan of United States Army
