= 26th Field Artillery Regiment (United States) =

US military unit

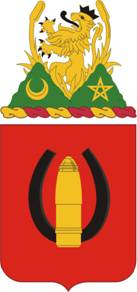
- Coat of arms
- Active: 1918
- Country: United States
- Branch: Army
- Type: Field artillery
- Motto(s): Courage and Action

Insignia
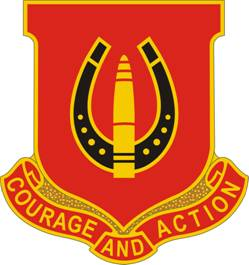
- Distinctive unit insignia

The 26th Field Artillery Regiment is a field artillery regiment of the United States Army first constituted 5 July 1918 in the National Army (USA).

== Lineage ==
Constituted 5 July 1918 in the National Army as the 26th Field Artillery and assigned to the 9th Division

Organized 2 August 1918 at Camp McClellan, Alabama

Demobilized 9 February 1919 at Camp McClellan, Alabama

Reconstituted 24 March 1923 in the Regular Army as the 26th Field Artillery

Assigned 22 July 1929 to the 5th Division

Relieved 1 January 1930 from assignment to the 5th Division and assigned to the 9th Division (later redesignated as the 9th Infantry Division)

Activated 1 August 1940 at Fort Bragg, North Carolina

Reorganized and redesignated 1 October 1940 as the 26th Field Artillery Battalion

Inactivated 20 November 1946 in Germany

Activated 15 July 1947 at Fort Dix, New Jersey

Relieved 1 December 1957 from assignment to the 9th Infantry Division; concurrently, reorganized and redesignated as the 26th Artillery, a parent regiment under the Combat Arms Regimental System

Redesignated 1 September 1971 as the 26th Field Artillery

Withdrawn 16 June 1988 from the Combat Arms Regimental System and reorganized under the United States Army Regimental System

Redesignated 1 October 2005 as the 26th Field Artillery Regiment

== Distinctive unit insignia ==
- Description

A Gold color metal and enamel device 1 1/8 inches (2.9 cm) in height overall consisting of a shield blazoned: Gules, in front of a horseshoe Proper, a 75mm projectile Or. Attached below the shield a Red scroll inscribed "COURAGE AND ACTION" in Gold letters.

- Symbolism

The shield is red for Artillery. The horseshoe and the projectile suggest the character of the Regiment.

- Background

The distinctive unit insignia was originally approved for the 26th Field Artillery Regiment on 21 October 1938. It was amended to revise the description on 22 March 1939. The insignia was redesignated for the 26th Field Artillery Battalion on 30 November 1940. It was redesignated for the 26th Artillery Regiment on 14 April 1958. It was redesignated for the 26th Field Artillery Regiment effective 1 September 1971.

== Coat of arms ==
- Blazon
- Shield

Gules, in front of a horseshoe Proper, a 75mm projectile Or.

- Crest

On a wreath of the colors Or and Gules, issuing from an open wreath of two rushes of the first a lion rampant of the like crowned, armed and langued Sable surmounted in base by two mounts Vert, that on the dexter bearing a crescent of the first and that on the sinister a mullet interlaced of the like. Motto COURAGE AND ACTION.

- Symbolism
- Shield

The shield is red for Artillery. The horseshoe and the projectile suggest the character of the Regiment.

- Crest

The lion with rushes is taken from the arms of the city of Dinant on the bank of the Meuse River. It refers to the unit's World War II action in that area for which it was cited by the Belgian Army. Dinant is the bitterly contested point at which the 9th Division finally crossed the Meuse in force and established a secure bridgehead from which the enemy was pursued into Germany. The two hills bearing the crescent and the star for Algeria and French Morocco, refer to the unit's initial combat experience, i.e., the assault landings in North Africa.

- Background

The coat of arms was originally approved for the 26th Field Artillery Regiment on 22 October 1938. It was amended to revise the blazon of the shield on 22 March 1939. The insignia was redesignated for the 26th Field Artillery Battalion on 30 November 1940. It was redesignated for the 26th Artillery Regiment on 14 April 1958. It was amended to add a crest on 2 September 1964. It was redesignated for the 26th Field Artillery Regiment effective 1 September 1971.

== Current configuration ==
- Battery A, 26th Field Artillery Regiment (41st Fires Brigade, Fort Hood, Texas)
- Battery B, 26th Field Artillery Regiment (212th Fires Brigade, Fort Bliss, Texas)
- Battery C, 26th Field Artillery Regiment (75th Fires Brigade, Fort Sill, Oklahoma) Inactivated at Fort Sill
- Battery D, 26th Field Artillery Regiment (18th Fires Brigade, Fort Bragg, North Carolina)
- Battery F, 26th Field Artillery Regiment (17th Fires Brigade, Fort Lewis, Washington)
- Battery H, 26th Field Artillery Regiment (214th Fires Brigade, Fort Sill, Oklahoma) Inactivated at Fort Sill 2015

Although not currently active, Battery E was part of the 11th Air Assault Division (Test) at Fort Benning, GA, from 1963 to 1965.

== Campaign participation credit ==
World War II: Algeria-French Morocco (with arrowhead), Tunisia, Sicily, Normandy, Northern France, Rhineland, Central Europe

Vietnam: Counteroffensive, Phase II; Counteroffensive, Phase III; Tet Counteroffensive; Counteroffensive, Phase IV; Counteroffensive, Phase V; Counteroffensive, Phase VI; Tet 69/ Counteroffensive; Summer-Fall 1969; Winter-Spring 1970; Sanctuary Counteroffensive; Counteroffensive, Phase VII, Consolidation I

== Decorations ==
Presidential Unit Citation (Army), Streamer embroidered BINH THUAN PROVINCE

Presidential Unit Citation (Navy), Streamer embroidered VIETNAM 1967

Meritorious Unit Commendation (Navy), Streamer embroidered VIETNAM 1968

Belgian Fourragere 1940

Cited in the Order of the Day of the Belgian Army for action along the Meuse River

Cited in the Order of the Day of the Belgian Army for action in the Ardennes

== See also ==
- Field Artillery Branch (United States)
