= Richard G. Graves =

United States Army general

Richard Gordon Graves
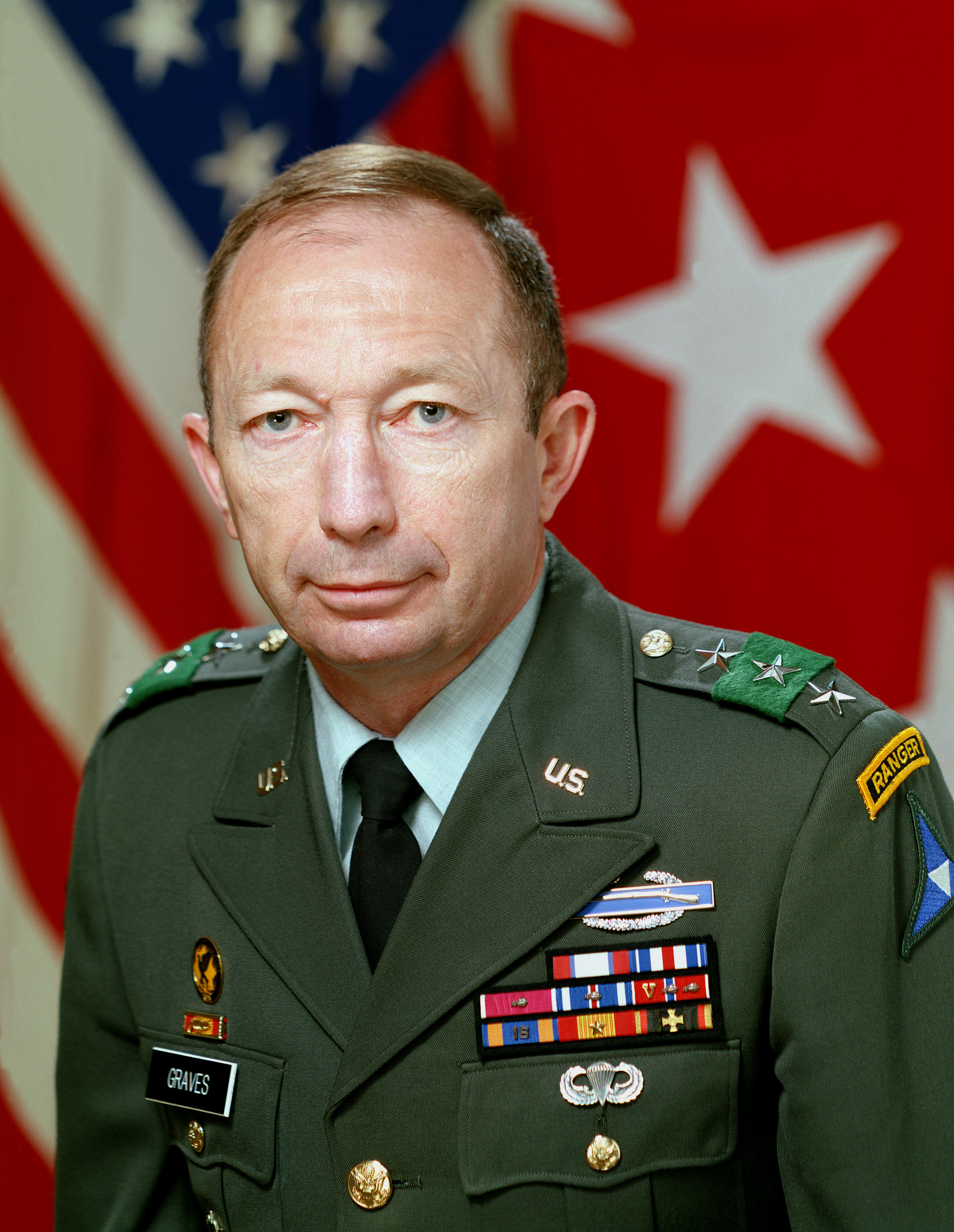
- Born: October 30, 1933 (age 92); Tangier, Indiana, U.S.
- Military career
- Allegiance: United States
- Branch: United States Army
- Rank: Lieutenant general
- Commands: III Corps, Fort Hood

Richard Gordon Graves (born October 30, 1933) is a retired lieutenant general in the United States Army. He was Commander of III Corps and Fort Hood. He is a 1958 graduate of the U.S. Military Academy.

== Biography ==
Lieutenant General (Ret.) Richard G. Graves was born in Tangier, Indiana on 30 October 1933. He was commissioned in Armor and awarded a Bachelor of Science Degree from the United States Military Academy in 1958. He also holds a Master of Arts Degree in political science from Indiana University. His military education includes completion of the Armor Officer Basic Course, the Infantry Officer Advanced Course, the Armed Forces Staff College, and the Army War College. General Graves last served as Commander of III Corps at Fort Hood, Texas. Prior to serving as Commander of III Corps, he served as the Assistant Deputy Chief of Staff for Operations and Plans, Washington, D.C. He also has served as the Deputy Chief of Staff for Operations with the United States Army Forces Command, Fort McPherson, Georgia. General Graves has served in Europe as Commander, 3d Armored Division (Spearhead); Commander 3d Brigade, 8th Infantry Division (Mechanized); Assistant Chief of Staff, G-3, V Corps; Chief of the War Plans Division, ODCSOPS, USAREURl and as a Brigade Executive Officer in the 1st Armored Division. General Graves had two tours of duty in Vietnam, first as an advisor with the Military Assistance Command and later as an Infantry Brigade Executive Officer and Squadron Commander of the 1st Squadron, 1st U.S. Cavalry. He served at Fort Hood from 1979 to 1983 as Chief of Staff of the 2nd Armored Division and III Corps and Fort Hood, and Assistant Division Commander, 1st Cavalry Division. General Graves' decorations include the Distinguished Service Medal (with Oak Leaf Cluster), the Silver Star, the Legion of Merit (with Oak Leaf Cluster), the Distinguished Flying Cross (with Oak Leaf Cluster), the Bronze Star with V device (with two Oak Leaf Clusters), the Meritorious Service Medal, several Air Medals and the Army Commendation Medal (with Oak Leaf Cluster). He has also earned the Combat Infantryman Badge, the Army Parachutist Badge, and the Ranger Tab. General Graves retired from the Active Army on 1 August 1991. On 1 January 1992, he accepted employment with General Dynamics Corporation as a Division Vice-president in Land Systems Division. After serving four years in Riyadh, Saudi Arabia and two years at Corporate Headquarters in Falls Church, Virginia, General Graves took a second retirement on 31 December 1998 from General Dynamics Corporation. General Graves is married to the former Beverly (Bev) Fewell. They have three children: William, Thomas and Myra Wright, and seven grandchildren.
