= 212th Field Artillery Brigade =

212th Fires Brigade
- Shoulder Sleeve Insignia
- Active: 1944 - 2014
- Country: United States
- Branch: United States Army
- Role: Field Artillery Branch (United States)
- Size: Brigade
- Garrison/HQ: Fort Bliss
- Mottos: Courage and Command
- Engagements: Operation Iraqi Freedom

Insignia
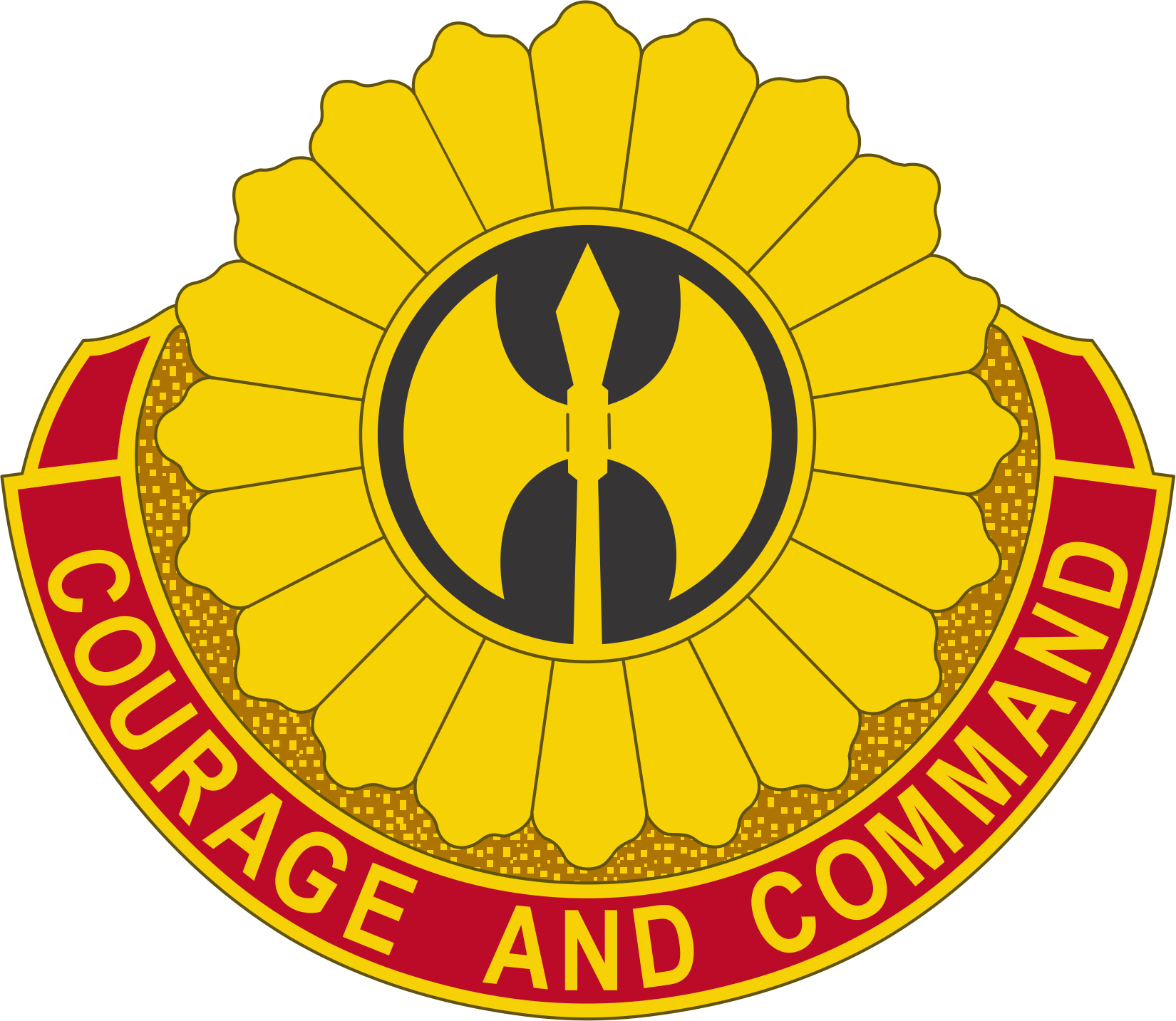
- Distinctive Unit Insignia

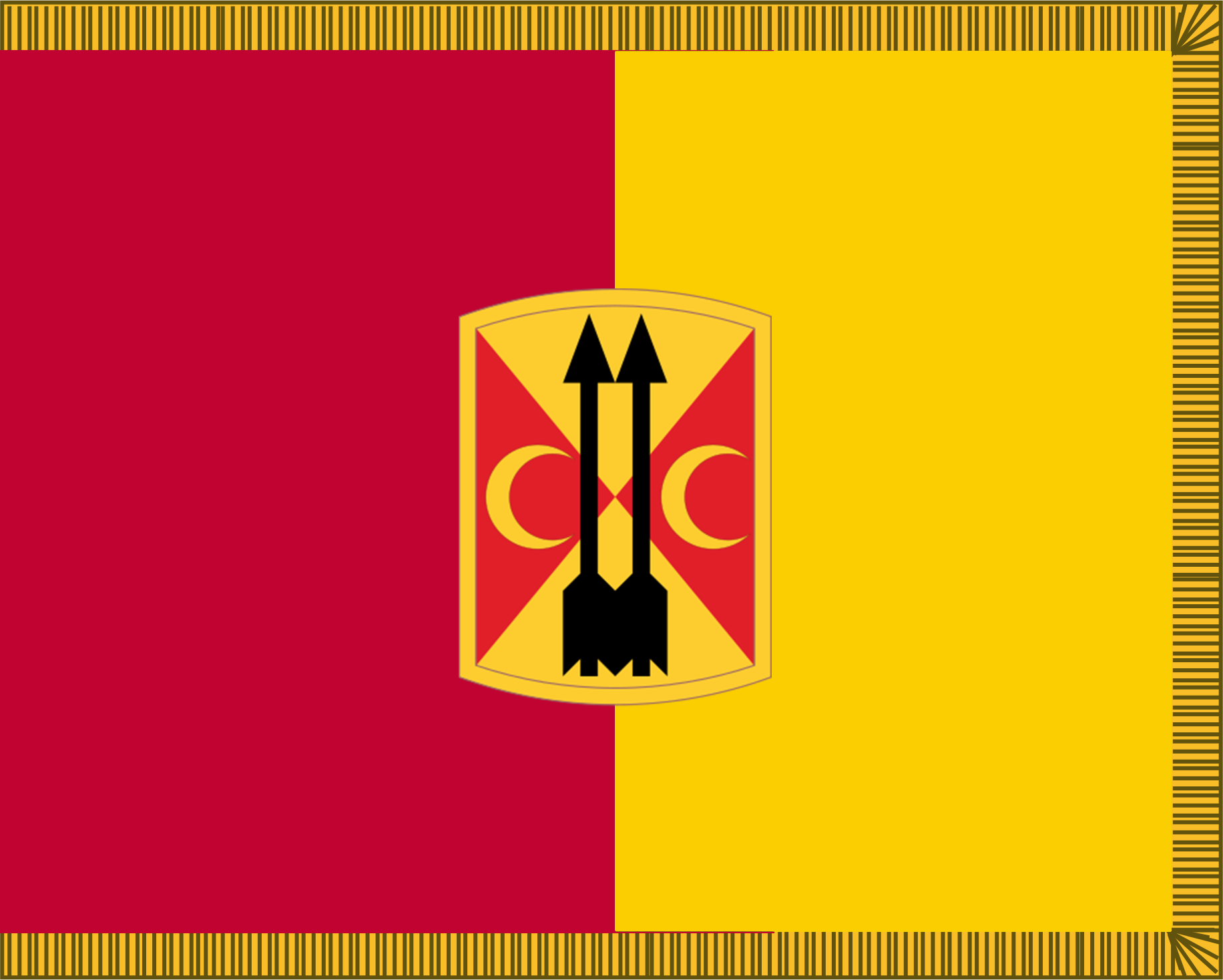
- 212th Field Artillery Brigade Flag

The 212th Fires Brigade was an artillery brigade in the United States Army. It was based at Fort Bliss, Texas and was a subordinate unit of III Corps until 2014.

== Organization ==
- Headquarters and Headquarters Battery (HHB)
- B Battery, 26th Field Artillery Regiment (B-26th FAR) (Target Acquisition)
- 72nd Brigade Support Battalion (72nd BSB)
- 208th Signal Company

== History ==
The 212th Field Artillery Brigade was organized as Headquarters and Headquarters Battery, 212th Artillery Group and was constituted on 3 February 1944. Headquarters and Headquarters Battery, 212th Field Artillery Group was organized and activated on 20 April 1944 at Fort Riley, KS, and was assigned to XVI Corps. The group consisted of four truck-driven 105 mm howitzers and 81 enlisted men. In July 1944, the group was assigned to XXXVI Corps. The group headquarters prepared for duty in Europe while the battalions were reassigned to the United States in November 1944.

Assigned to and controlled by XXVI Corps during the remainder of WWII, the group participated in the Central European Campaign with the 9th Infantry Division in the general vicinity of Aachen in northern Germany. On 20 April 1946, the group was inactivated in Germany. The group was reconstituted on 17 September 1958 and allotted to the Regular Army. The same order activated the group on 15 October 1958 in Germany; the 212th FA Group was then further assigned to Seventh Army, and attached to V Corps. In the fall of 1967, the group was designed to redeploy to CONUS under project REFORGER. On 9 April 1968, the group departed Germany for its new home at Fort Lewis, Washington.

In August 1972, the group headquarters and three of its battalion (2-17th FA, 2-18th FA, & 3-18th FA) relocated to Fort Sill. In June 1973, 1-30th FA was reorganized and assigned to the group. In mid-1976, 2-18th FA deployed to Germany. On 1 October 1976, the 1-30th FA was returned to VII Corps, USAREUR. Later that month, 2-18th FA returned to the group.

On 16 July 1980, the 212th Field Artillery Group was redesignated the 212th Field Artillery Brigade. In September 1980, the 212th Field Artillery Brigade became the first TACFIRE-equipped brigade in the Army. In September 1990, the brigade deployed to Saudi Arabia, and participated in Operations Desert Shield and Desert Storm.

In 2003, 2-5 FA and 2-18 FA deployed in support of Operation Iraqi Freedom. On 12 April 2003, 2-5 FA, 212th FA BDE, deployed with the 3d Armored Cavalry Regiment (ACR) in support of Operation Iraqi Freedom (OIF I). Upon arriving in theatre, 2-5 FA quickly postured itself to perform as the regiment's direct support (DS) artillery battalion but ultimately assumed responsibilities as another ground maneuver unit. As a ground maneuver unit, 2-5 FA was responsible for an area of operations (AO) that exceeded 6,500 square kilometers within the Al Anbar Province. 2-5 FA priorities shifted to include providing security and re-establishing national operations in Iraq, serving as a maneuver force, conducting humanitarian assistance (HA) operations and training Iraqi Civil Defense Corps (ICDC) forces. 2-5 FA conducted combat patrols, manned traffic control points (TCPs) and conducted raids to defeat those militant forces seeking to destabilize the towns and cities within 2-5 FA's AO. 2-5 FA shot more than 1,000 rounds in support of the 3d ACR and battalion operations. 2-5 FA redeployed to back Fort Sill, rejoining 212th FA BDE in March 2004. 2-18 Field Artillery battalion received a warning order to prepare to deploy to operation Iraqi Freedom I in 2003. The battalion quickly fielded the Advanced Field Artillery Tactical Data System (AFATDS) version 6.3.1, Automated Deep Operations Coordination System (ADOCS), Command and Control Personal Computer (C2PC), Effects Management Tool (EMT), Blue Force Tracker, All Source Analysis System (ASAS) Light, completed individual training certifications (TSJRTs) and rail loaded its equipment in record time. The main body deployed in January 2003. The pace of operations was intense in theater as the battalion completed its Reception, Staging, Onward movement, and Integration (RSOI) within 48 hours of receiving equipment from the Sea Port of Debarkation (SPOD). The battalion and its Soldiers were one of only a few units to participate in the full spectrum of conflict. SSG Rucker and SGT Harvey, Alpha Battery Section Chiefs, and SSG Molyneaux of Charlie Battery, each fired lethal Block lA ATACMS Suppression of Enemy Air Defense (SEAD) missions for both V Corps in support of the II " Attack Helicopter Regiment's attack in zone (TALON I) and Coalition Forces Land Component Command (CFLCC) in support of the I Marine Expeditionary Force (I MEF). On 14 April 2003, the battalion officially transitioned from combat to stability operations and support operations (S0S0) as part of CJTF-7"s TF Bullet I effort to collect and secure captured enemy ammunition and equipment (CEE/CEA). Unlike previous US Army SOSO deployments, coalition forces in the Iraqi Theater of Operations (ITO) faced a determined former regime paramilitary effort, while performing their missions. The Mission Ready battalion uploaded, cataloged and transported •over 5100 short tons of enemy equipment/ammunition and traveled over 17,000 kilometers in support of CEA operations throughout the ITO. 2-18 FA also provided over 30 percent of its assigned strength in support of fixed site security for LSA Dogwood and Mission Ready Base. On 12 September 2003, CJTF-7 assigned the battalion the mission to standup and train an Iraqi Civil Defense Corps (ICDC) battalion for Multi-National Division, Central South (MND CS). When completed with training, this CDC battalion served with MND (CS) 1st Brigade Combat Team (BCT) Poland. Both TF Bullet and CDC were key elements in providing a safe and secure Iraq and setting the conditions for a peaceful transfer of political control from the Office of Coalition Provisional Authority (OCPA) to Iraqi authorities.

On 5 September 2005, the Brigade HQs, augmented by 2–5, 6-27, and 6-32 FA HQs, deployed to Iraq during Operation Iraqi Freedom 05–07 as the unit fill for the Joint Area Support Group-Central (JASG-C) in the International Zone, Baghdad, Iraq. 2-5 FA deployed as three PLS Truck Batteries. 6–32 FA (MLRS), 212th FA BDE served as a Heavy Equipment Transport (HET) Company. HHS, Alpha, Bravo, and Charlie Batteries were reorganized into four HET platoons, along with the Maintenance PLT and HQ Sections. Once they arrived in Iraq, HHS, Alpha, and Charlie 6–32 FA operated out of Camp Taji, and a small squad sized element at TQ (Al Taqqadum), while Bravo, 6–32 FA operated out of Al Asad Air Base in the Al Anbar Province. The Brigade's units returned to Ft. Sill, OK in November 2006. 2-18 FA remained "Mission Ready" as part of the nation's strategic hedge for contingency operations. The 212th Field Artillery Brigade received the Meritorious Unit Citation for its deployment in support of Operation Iraqi Freedom.

The 212th Field Artillery Brigade cased its colors in January 2007 at Fort Sill Oklahoma. Upon casing, 2-5 FA was reassigned to 214th Fires Brigade while 2-18th FA was reassigned to 75th Fires Brigade. 6-32 FA was deactivated and its colors cased.

The 212th was reactivated as a Fires Brigade (FiB) on 16 August 2011 at Fort Bliss, Texas, under the First Armored Division, with COL David Hamilton commanding. At the time, the unit only consisted of a Headquarters & Headquarters Battery, a Target Acquisition Battery, a Signal Company, and a Brigade Support Battalion - no Fires Battalions, leaving the unit with no combat power or major weapon systems. The Army planned to transfer one FA Battalion of HIMARS from 17th Fires Brigade (Joint Base Lewis McChord) to 212FiB, and either build or activate a new FA Battalion. Due to changes in Army operational requirements, and possibly budgetary constraints, these changes were never actioned by the Army. In 2013, Command of the 212FiB changed from COL Hamilton to COL Heyward Hutson. On 23 July 2014 the 212FiB colors were cased, and the mission reflagged to become the 1AD's Division Artillery (DIVARTY).

== Lineage ==
- Constituted 3 February 1944 in the Army of the United States as Headquarters and Headquarters Battery, 212th Field Artillery Group
- Activated 20 April 1944 at Fort Riley, Kansas
- Inactivated 30 April 1946 in Germany
- Redesignated 17 September 1958 as Headquarters and Headquarters Battery, 212th Artillery Group, and allotted to the Regular Army
- Activated 15 October 1958 in Germany
- Redesignated 15 March 1972 as Headquarters and Headquarters Battery, 212th Field Artillery Group
- Redesignated 16 July 1980 as Headquarters and Headquarters Battery, 212th Field Artillery Brigade
- Inactivated 15 January 2007 at Fort Sill, Oklahoma
- Redesignated 16 January 2010 as Headquarters and Headquarters Battery, 212th Fires Brigade
- Activated 16 August 2011 at Fort Bliss, Texas
- Inactivated 23 July 2014 at Fort Bliss, Texas
