= III Armored Corps =

One of four active corps of the U.S. Army, currently part of U.S. Army Forces Command

III Corps
- Active: 16 May 1918–9 August 1919; 15 August 1927–10 October 1946; 15 March 1951–5 May 1959; 1 September 1961–present
- Country: United States of America
- Branch: United States Army
- Type: Armored Corps
- Role: Headquarters
- Part of: United States Army Western Hemisphere Command
- Garrison/HQ: Fort Hood, Texas
- Nickname: "Phantom Corps" or "America's Hammer"
- Colors: Blue and White
- Engagements: World War I; Aisne-Marne; Oise-Aisne; Meuse-Argonne; Champagne 1918; Lorraine 1918; World War II; Northern France; Rhineland; Ardennes-Alsace; Central Europe; Operation Iraqi Freedom; Iraqi Governance; National Resolution; Iraqi Surge; Operation Inherent Resolve
- Decorations: Meritorious Unit Commendation with 3 oak leaf clusters Joint Meritorious Unit Award

Commanders
- Commanding General: LTG Kevin Admiral
- Command Sergeant Major: CSM James L. Light
- Deputy Commanding General, Maneuver: BG Jared Bordwell
- Deputy Commanding General, Support: Maj Gen Andy Cox, British Army

Insignia
- Shoulder Sleeve Insignia

- Distinctive unit insignia

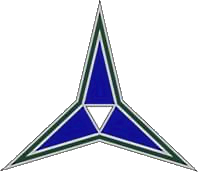
- Combat service identification badge

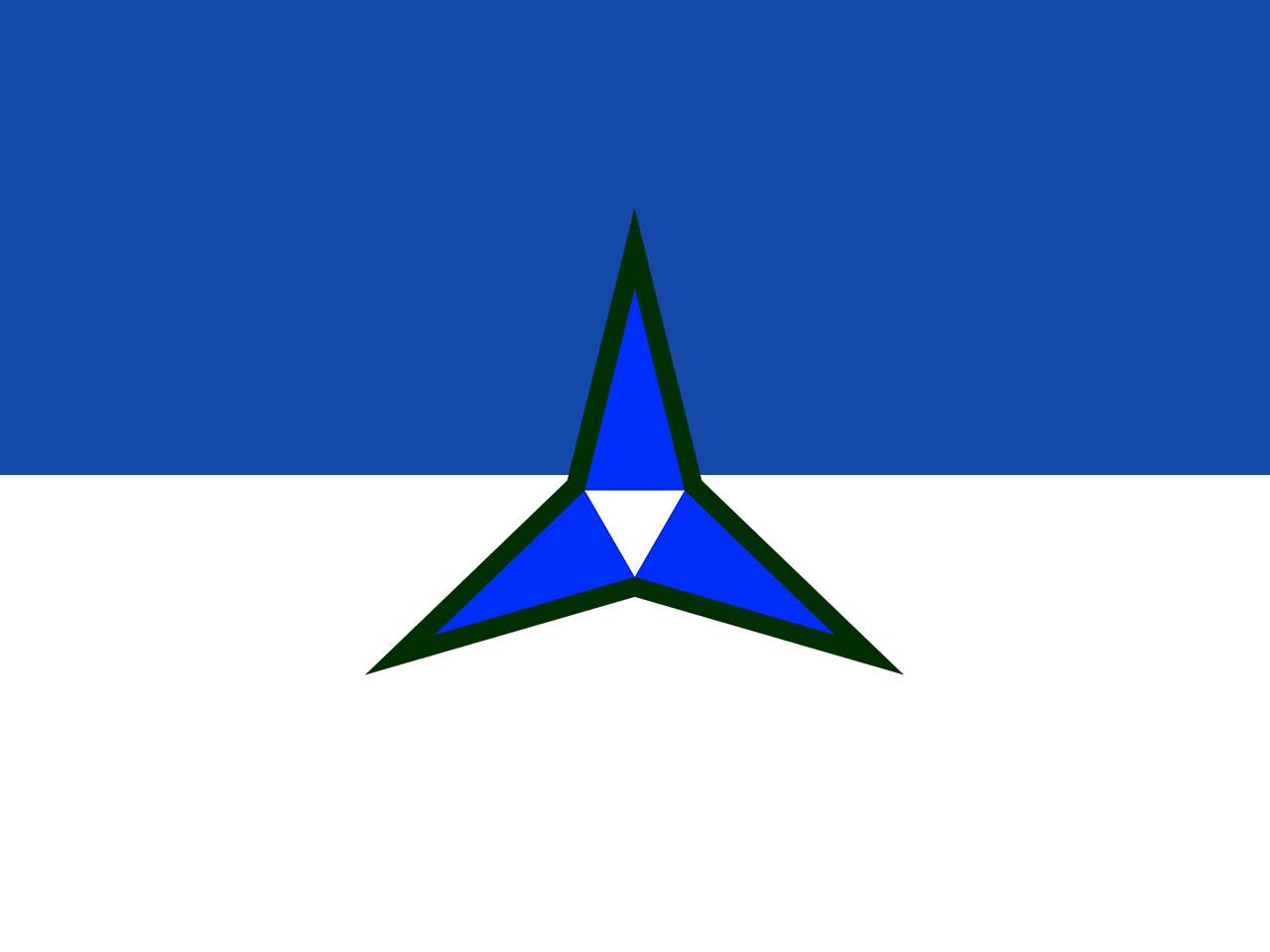
- III Corps Flag

III Armored Corps is a corps of the United States Army headquartered at Fort Hood, Texas. It is a major formation of United States Army Western Hemisphere Command.

Activated in World War I in France, III Corps oversaw US Army divisions as they repelled several major German offensives and led them into Germany. The corps was deactivated following the end of the war.

Reactivated in the interwar years, III Corps trained US Army formations for combat before and during World War II, before itself being deployed to the European Theater where it participated in several key engagements, including the Battle of the Bulge where it relieved the surrounded 101st Airborne Division.

For the next 50 years, the corps was a key training element for the US Army as it sent troops overseas in support of the Cold War, the Korean War, and the Vietnam War. While all of the major units of III Corps were deployed for Desert Shield/Desert Storm, the corps itself saw no combat deployments, until Operation Iraqi Freedom in 2003. As of April 2019, III Corps includes some of the oldest formations of their type in the US Army: 1st Infantry Division, 1st Cavalry Division, 1st Armored Division and 1st Medical Brigade.

== History ==
=== World War I ===
III Corps was first organized on 16 May 1918 in France. It was designed as three of the four newly activated corps of the American Expeditionary Force, which at that time numbered over one million men in 23 divisions. The corps took command of US forces training with the French Seventh Army at the same time that IV Corps took command of US forces training with the French Eighth Army.

==== Aisne-Marne campaign ====
In July, the corps was rushed to the Villers-Cotterêts area in preparation for the Third Battle of the Aisne, the first major Allied counteroffensive of the year. There, it was put under the French Tenth Army and given administrative command of the 1st Division and the 2nd Division which were previously under command of the French XX Corps. However, the command group arrived in the area too late to exercise tactical command, and it was instead attached to the French XX Corps. On 18 July, the attack was launched, with the force spearheading the French Tenth Army's assault on the high ground south of Soissons. During this attack, the Corps also cut rail lines supplying the German Army.

The first day of the attack was a success, but on the second day, the Germans were reinforced with heavier weapons and were able to blunt the attack, inflicting high casualties. The force was successful despite heavy casualties, and German forces were forced to retreat. On 1 August, the corps arrived in the Vesle area near the Marne River, where it assumed command of the 3rd Division, 28th Division, and 32nd Division from the French XXXVIII Corps, placing side by side with the U.S. I Corps for a few days. Troops continued to advance until September when they withdrew to form the new First United States Army.

==== Meuse-Argonne campaign ====
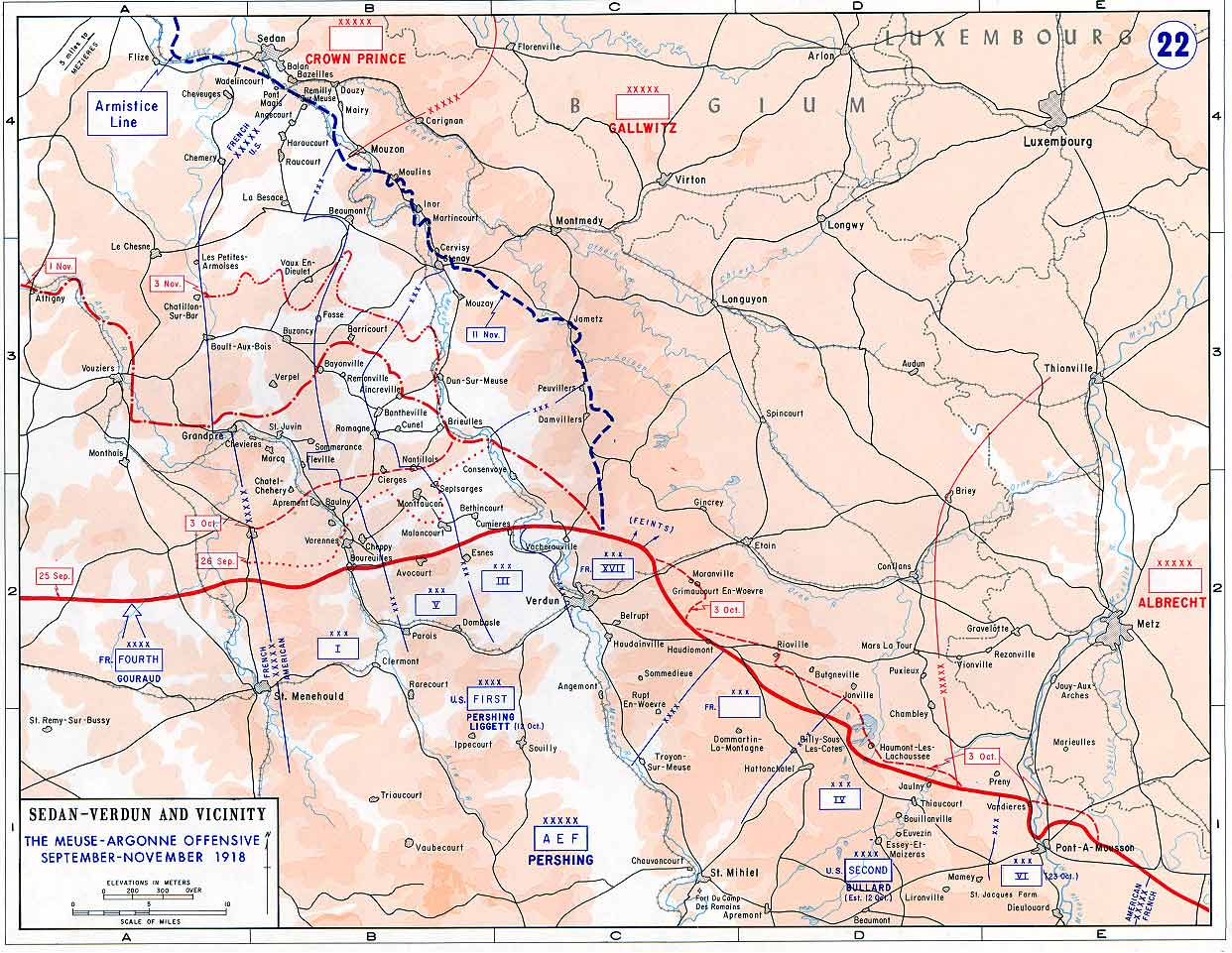
Map of the area during the Meuse-Argonne campaign

First Army formed up in preparation to advance in the Meuse-Argonne campaign. It consisted of over 600,000 men in I Corps, III Corps, and V Corps. III Corps took the Army's east flank, protecting it as the Army advanced to Montfaucon, then Cunel and Romagne-sous-Montfaucon. The offensive was slow and hampered by inexperience of many of the divisions under the Army's command, though III Corps was effective in protecting its sector. They advanced through September and October, taking a few weeks for rest after the formation of Second United States Army. On 1 November, the First Army went on a general offensive, pushing north to the Meuse River and the Barricourt Ridge. It was successful, pushing German forces back and advancing to the river until the end of the war. Around that time, III Corps received its shoulder sleeve insignia, approved it by telegram, though the insignia would not be officially authorized until 1922. The corps reached the border with Germany on 23 November.

The corps was demobilized in Neuwied, Germany at the close of hostilities. Following the end of World War I, III Corps remained in Europe for several months before it returned to the United States. It was demobilized at Camp Sherman, Ohio.

=== Interwar period ===
==== III Corps (I) ====
The first iteration of the III Corps was constituted in the Organized Reserve on 29 July 1921, allotted to the Third Corps Area, and assigned to the First Army. The corps headquarters was initiated on 15 December 1921 at Baltimore, Maryland, with Reserve personnel. The corps headquarters was activated about 10 April 1922 at the Dauphin Building, Harrisburg, Pennsylvania, with Regular Army personnel (Reserve personnel from the corps area at large remained assigned for administration, mobilization, and training purposes). The corps headquarters was responsible for providing and planning administration, organization, supply, and training for army, corps, and other nondivisional Reserve units, less field and coast artillery, in the Third Corps Area. The Headquarters Company was initiated in April 1923 with Reserve personnel at Norristown, Pennsylvania. The corps headquarters was relieved from active duty in early 1925 and all Regular Army personnel were reassigned to the Headquarters, Non-Divisional Group, Third Corps Area, which assumed the responsibilities previously held by the III Corps. Both the headquarters and the Headquarters Company remained active in the Organized Reserve.

==== Army reorganization ====
As part of an Army reorganization beginning in August 1927 that grouped the new XX, XXI, and XXII Corps, organized in the Regular Army, under the new Seventh Army, also a Regular formation and the successor of the old First Army, as a contingency force staffed by professional soldiers rather than reservists that could immediately take control of forces and respond to any emergency, the III Corps HHC were withdrawn from the Organized Reserve and demobilized on 15 August 1927. Concurrently, all Reserve personnel were relieved from assignment. Less than two months later, however, the Seventh Army was redesignated the new First Army, and the XX, XXI, and XXII Corps as the new I, II, and III Corps, respectively.

==== III Corps (II) ====
The second iteration of the III Corps was constituted in the Regular Army as HHC, XXII Corps, allotted to the Third Corps Area, and assigned to the Seventh Army. Redesignated HHC, III Corps on 13 October 1927 and concurrently assigned to the First Army. The designated headquarters location for peacetime organization purposes was Baltimore, Maryland. On 1 October 1933, the corps headquarters was partially activated at Baltimore with Regular personnel from Headquarters, Third Corps Area and Reserve personnel from the corps area at large. Though a "Regular Army Inactive" unit from 1933 to 1940, the corps headquarters was occasionally organized provisionally for short periods using its assigned Reserve officers and staff officers from Headquarters, Third Corps Area. These periods of provisional active auty were generally for CPXs and major maneuvers such as the First Army maneuvers in 1935, 1939, and 1940. The designated mobilization station for the corps headquarters was Camp George G. Meade, Maryland, where it would assume command and control of its assigned subordinate corps troops which would then be mobilizing primarily in the Third Corps Area. However, the III Corps was fully activated on 18 December 1940, less Reserve personnel, at the Presidio of Monterey, California, and concurrently relieved from the First Army and assigned to the Fourth Army. Upon activation, the 8th, 28th, and 29th Divisions were relieved from the troop list and the corps assumed command and control of the 7th and 40th Divisions. The corps Headquarters Company was activated on 10 February 1941 at Fort Ord. The corps participated in the Fourth Army maneuvers in August 1941. After the maneuver, the corps returned to Monterey where it was located on 7 December 1941.

=== World War II ===
Following the Japanese attack on Pearl Harbor bringing America into World War II, III Corps remained in the United States, where it was assigned to organize defenses of the West Coast, specifically California, against the threat of attack from Japan. During this time III Corps operated at Monterey, California.

The corps was moved to Fort McPherson, Georgia in early 1942 for training. After a short period, the corps returned to Monterey and on 19 August 1942, it was designated a separate corps, capable of deployment. During the next two years, III Corps would train thousands of troops for combat and participate in corps-level maneuvers, including the Louisiana Maneuvers.

==== Europe ====
On 23 August 1944, the corps headquarters departed California for Camp Myles Standish in Massachusetts. It deployed for the European Theater of Operations (ETO) on 5 September 1944. Upon arrival at Cherbourg, France, III Corps, under the command of Major General John Millikin, was assigned to the Ninth Army, part of Lieutenant General Omar Bradley's U.S. 12th Army Group, and given the code name "CENTURY" which it retained throughout the war. The corps headquarters was established at Carteret, in Normandy, and for six weeks, the corps received and processed all the troops of the 12th Army Group arriving over the Normandy beaches during that period. The corps also participated in the "Red Ball Express" by organizing 45 provisional truck companies to carry fuel and ammunition for the units on the front lines.

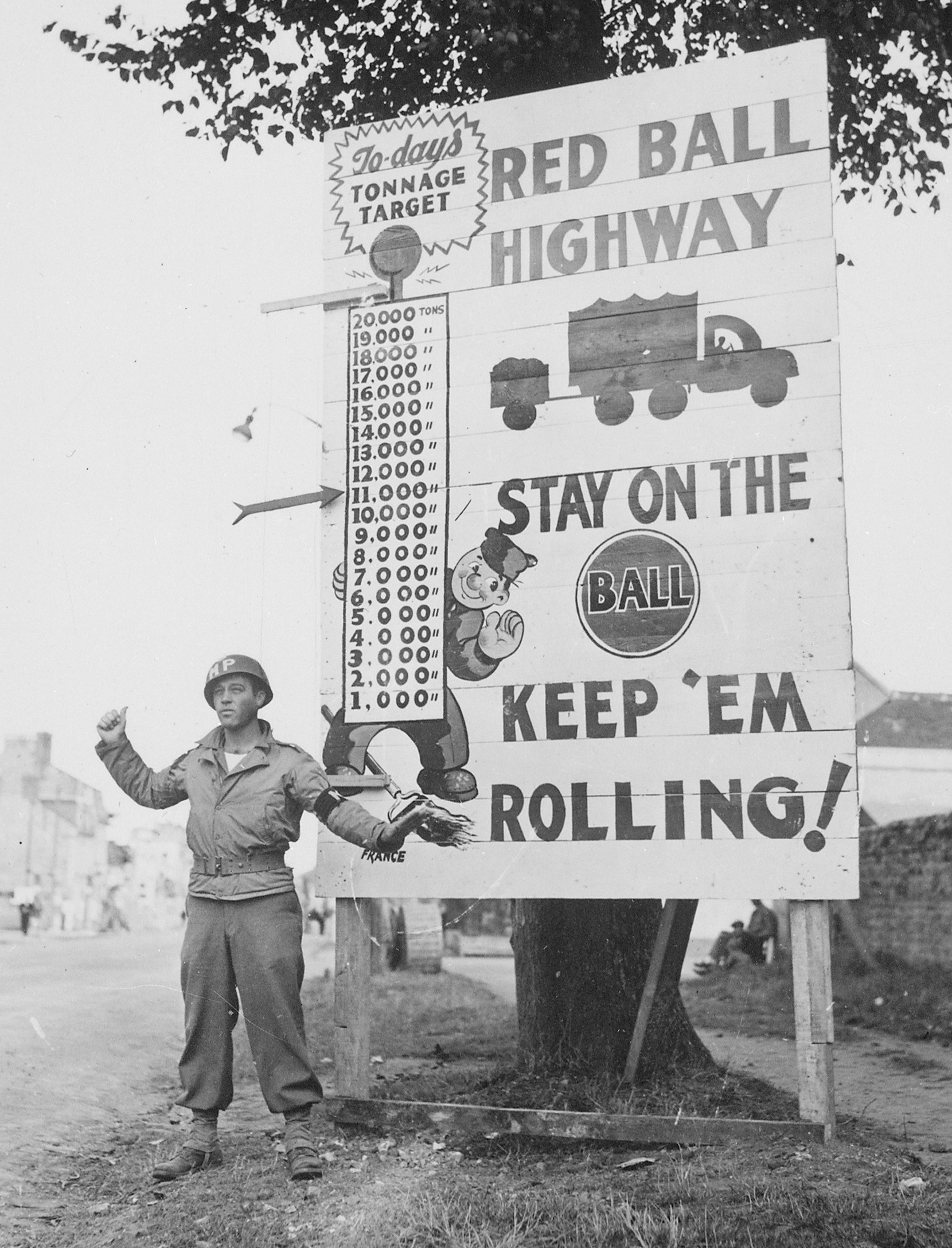
The "Red Ball Express" which III Corps helped organize.

The corps was assigned to Lieutenant General George S. Patton's Third Army on 10 October 1944, and moved to Etain, near Verdun, and into combat. The corps' first fighting was for the Metz region, as it was moved to attack Fort Jeanne d'Arc, one of the last forts holding out in the region. That fort fell on 13 December 1944.

Later that month on 16 December came the last German counteroffensive in the Battle of the Bulge, as over 250,000 German troops, supported by over 1,000 tanks and assault guns assaulted the lines of VIII Corps, some 40 miles to the north of III Corps. The next day Patton, the Third Army commander, warned III Corps that it would likely be ordered to assist. At that time the corps consisted of the 26th and 80th Infantry Divisions and the 4th Armored Division. III Corps was moved north to assist in the relief of Bastogne, Belgium, with the attack commencing at 04:00 on 22 December 1944. The corps advanced north, catching the German forces by surprise on their south flank, cutting them off. The 4th Armored Division was eventually able to reach Bastogne, where the 101st Airborne Division had been surrounded by German forces, and relieve it. During the first 10 days of this action, III Corps liberated more than 100 towns, including Bastogne. This operation was key in halting the German offensive and the eventual drive to the Rhine River.

During the first four months of 1945, III Corps moved quickly to the offensive. On 25 February, the corps, now as part of the First Army, established a bridgehead over the Roer River, which, in turn, led to the capture of the Ludendorff Bridge at Remagen, on the Rhine River, on 7 March. On 30 March, the Edersee Dam was captured intact by Task Force Wolfe of the 7th Armored Division, and the corps, now commanded by Major General James Van Fleet after Millikin's relief, continued the attack to seize the Ruhr Pocket on 5 April 1945. In late April, III Corps reformed and launched a drive through Bavaria towards Austria. On 2 May 1945, III Corps was ordered to halt at the foot of the Austrian Alps on the Austrian border, just days before V-E Day, when the German forces surrendered, bringing an end of World War II in Europe.

==== Post-war ====
At the end of the war, III Corps had added campaign streamers for Northern France, Rhineland, Ardennes-Alsace, and Central Europe. The corps had participated in most of the critical actions from Normandy to the German-Austrian border. Its wartime commanders included Major General John Millikin and Major General James A. Van Fleet. After 13 months of occupation duty in Germany, the corps returned to Camp Polk, Louisiana, where it was inactivated on 10 October 1946.

=== Cold War era ===
On 15 March 1951, during the height of the Korean War, III Corps was again called to active duty at Camp Roberts, California. In April 1954, III Corps moved to Fort Hood, Texas, where it participated in a number of important exercises, either as director headquarters or as a player unit. It took command of the 1st Armored Division and the 4th Armored Division. The main purpose of these operations was the testing of new doctrines, organizations, and equipment. On 5 May 1959, the corps was again inactivated.

The Berlin crisis brought III Corps back to active duty for the fourth time on 1 September 1961. Units participated in an intensive training program and were operationally ready by December 1961. In February 1962, the Department of the Army designated III Corps as a unit of the U.S. Strategic Army Corps and in September 1965, assigned III Corps to the U.S. Strategic Army Forces. Throughout much of the 1960s, III Corps and its subordinate units trained for rapid deployment to Europe in the event of an outbreak of war there.

During the Vietnam War era, the corps supervised the training and deployment of more than 137 units and detachments to Southeast Asia, including the I and II Field Force staffs. The corps also trained more than 40,000 individual replacements for units in Vietnam, for a total of over 100,000 soldiers trained. As the war in Southeast Asia ended, the corps received many units and individual soldiers for reassignment or inactivation. It was also during this period that III Corps units participated in a number of key tests and evaluations that would help determine Army organization and equipment for the next 30 years. During this era, the corps also received its distinctive unit insignia.

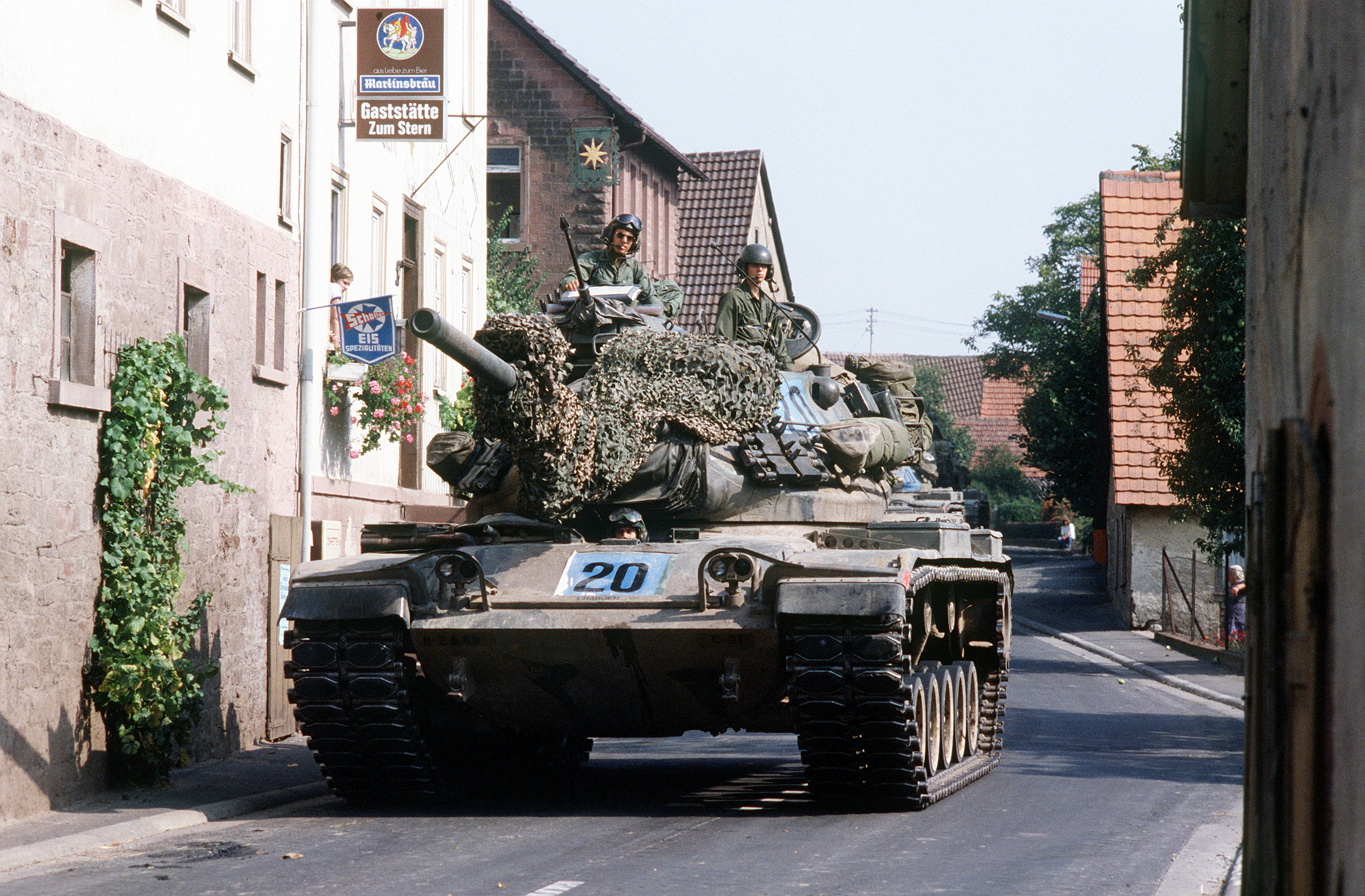
Exercise REFORGER which III Corps units participated in

In July 1973, III Corps became part of the newly established Forces Command and its training, testing, and evaluation mission began to grow. For the remainder of the decade, III Corps would take part in a number of Training and Doctrine Command tests of organizations and tactical concepts, and play a key role in the fielding of new equipment. III Corps units would also participate in major exercises such as Exercise REFORGER (Return of Forces to Germany) and disaster relief operations in the United States and Central America.

In the summer of 1974, the Army decided to implement one of the recommendations of the Howze Board and created an air cavalry combat brigade. The assets of the 2d Brigade, 1st Cavalry Division were used to create the 6th Cavalry Brigade (Air Combat). The new brigade was assigned to the III Corps as a corps asset. 1st Squadron, 6th Cavalry Regiment, was transferred to the new brigade on 21 February 1975. The brigade served as a test bed for new concepts involving the employment of attack helicopters on the modern battlefield. In 1984–85, the brigade consisted of 1st Squadron, 6th Cavalry; 4th Squadron, 9th Cavalry Regiment (4-9 CAV); and 5th and 7th Squadrons, 17th Cavalry Regiment (5-17 CAV and 7-17 CAV), all flying attack helicopters.

As part of the Army's modernization effort in the 1980s corps units introduced new organizations and equipment including the M1 Abrams tank, M2 Bradley Fighting Vehicle, AH-64 Apache helicopter, Multiple Launch Rocket System, and Mobile Subscriber Equipment. In 1985, a task force within the 6th Cavalry Brigade was elevated into the Apache Fielding Brigade, "to receive, equip and train, evaluate, and deploy all Army non-Fort Hood Apache helicopter battalions." On August 1, 1986, then-Colonel Malvin Handy was placed in command of the brigade, with the same mission, but a slightly different name: the Apache Training Brigade. Lt Gen Saint "..gave me $36 million and told me to make it happen,” Handy said. The task was daunting, even for an experienced, combat-proven attack pilot like Handy. “I thought, ‘this guy is crazy,’” he said. “I felt like Moses and some guy was handing me the Ten Commandments."

In 1987, III Corps also conducted the largest deployment of forces to Germany since the Second World War, Exercise Reforger '87. During this time, the corps began assisting in the training and support of active and reserve component units. This support involves training guidance, resources, and the maintenance of relationships that extend to wartime affiliations.

==== Formations in 1972 ====
In 1972 III Corps consisted of the following formations and units:

- III Corps, Fort Hood, Texas
  - 1st Cavalry Division, Fort Hood, Texas (Operation Reforger formation)
  - 2nd Armored Division, Fort Hood, Texas (Operation Reforger formation)
  - 5th Infantry Division (Mechanized), Fort Polk, Louisiana (Operation Reforger formation)
  - 101st Airborne Division, Fort Campbell, Kentucky
  - III Corps Artillery, Fort Sill, Oklahoma
    - 75th Field Artillery Brigade, Fort Sill, Oklahoma
    - 212th Field Artillery Brigade, Fort Sill, Oklahoma (Operation Reforger formation)
    - 214th Field Artillery Brigade, Fort Sill, Oklahoma
  - 3rd Armored Cavalry Regiment, Fort Bliss, Texas (Operation Reforger unit)
  - 6th Cavalry Brigade (Air Combat), Fort Hood, Texas
  - 31st Air Defense Artillery Brigade, Fort Hood, Texas
  - 89th Military Police Brigade, Fort Hood, Texas
  - 3rd Signal Brigade (Corps), Fort Hood, Texas
  - 504th Military Intelligence Brigade, Fort Hood, Texas
  - 13th Corps Support Command, Fort Hood, Texas

=== 1990s ===
Following the end of the Cold War, III Corps headquarters itself saw no major contingencies; however, it saw numerous units under its command deploy to contingencies around the world. III Corps units were sent to Grenada, Panama, Honduras, Saudi Arabia, Kuwait, and Iraq. In the fall of 1990, two 6th Cavalry Brigade (Air Combat) units deployed to Iraq during Operation Desert Shield. One of those units was 2nd Battalion, 158th Aviation Regiment, a Chinook battalion from Fort Hood. Other corps units also provided humanitarian support for Operation Restore Hope in Somalia. III Corps elements supported Operation Joint Endeavor in Bosnia and Herzegovina as well.

=== 21st century ===
In 2001, the corps was composed of the 1st Cavalry Division and the 4th Infantry Division as well as the 3rd Armored Cavalry Regiment and the 13th Corps Support Command. With realignment of the US Army, including several formations relocating from Europe, in 2006 the corps assumed responsibility for the 1st Infantry Division. In 2011, it took over command of the 1st Armored Division; both divisions had previously been part of V Corps in Germany.

The corps headquarters saw its first combat deployment since the Second World War in 2004, when it deployed to Iraq for Operation Iraqi Freedom. There, III Corps headquarters assumed duties as Headquarters Multi-National Corps – Iraq, relieving V Corps. III Corps served as the administrative command for 2,500 soldiers of the Multi-National Force – Iraq command element, providing operational direction into 2005, when it was returned to Fort Hood, relieved by XVIII Airborne Corps. III Corps has for many years participated in an exchange program which sees a Canadian Army officer appointed as a deputy commanding general. Notably, Peter Devlin deployed with the corps to Iraq in 2005.

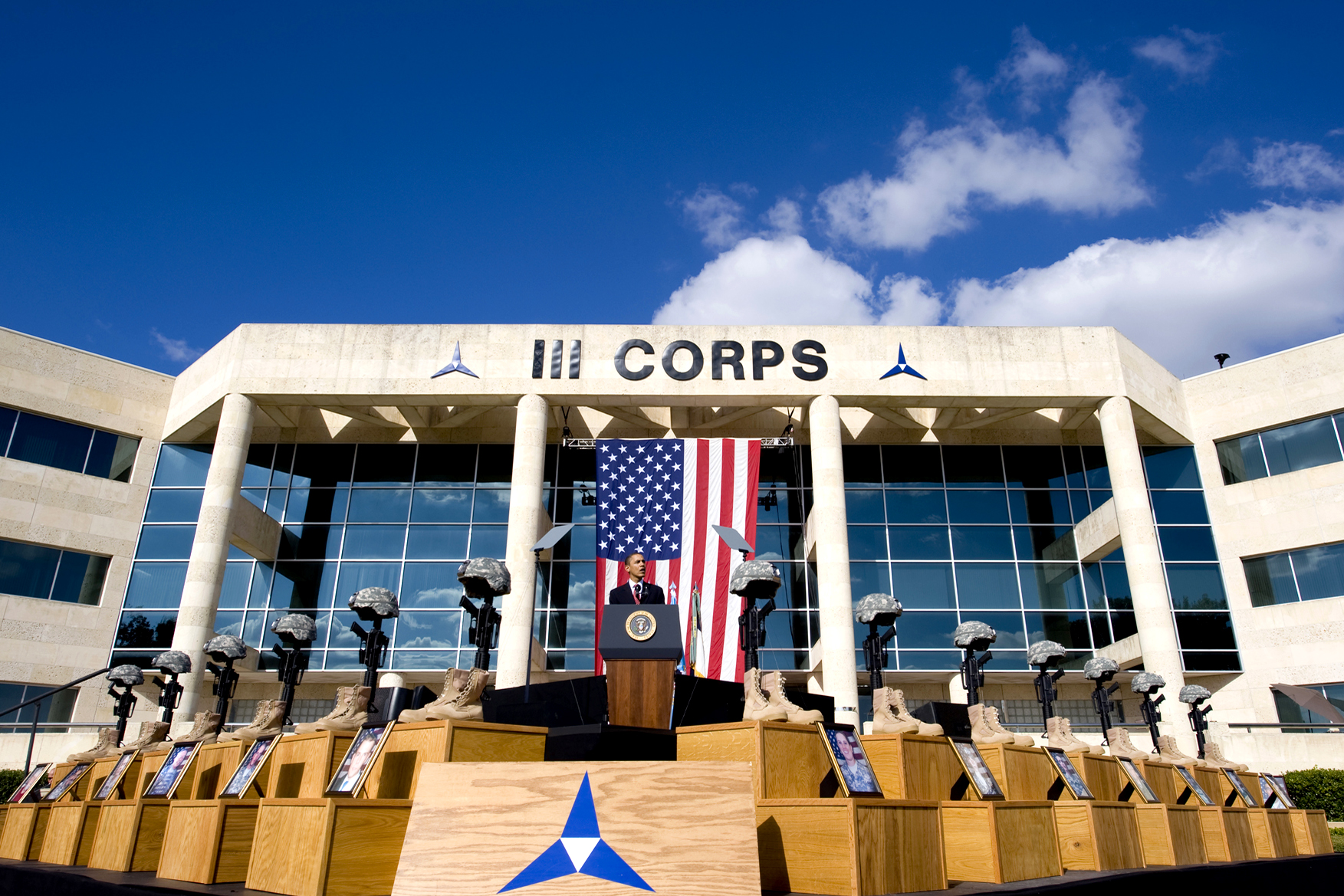
President Barack Obama speaks outside of III Corps headquarters, Fort Hood, Texas

In December 2006, the corps returned to Iraq for a second time to serve as commanding headquarters for Multi-National Corps Iraq. During this 15-month deployment, the corps took command of the force at its largest with Iraq War troop surge. The corps conducted a similar mission to its first deployment, focusing on providing personnel management, training, communications, convoy escort, and other duties to support the commanding elements of Multi-National Force Iraq. III Corps fulfilled this mission until February 2008, when it returned home, again relieved by XVIII Airborne Corps.

In 2009, the corps began a number of training initiatives with the Republic of Korea Army. These included Operation Key Resolve, a command post exercise simulating major, high intensity combat operations. The exercises were held in Yongin, South Korea. These operations were designed to keep the corps familiar with commanding during large-scale conventional warfare, as opposed to counter-insurgency tactics it employed during its two tours in Iraq. Upon return to the United States, the corps conducted similar exercises at Fort Hood.

On 5 November 2009, a gunman opened fire in the Soldier Readiness Center of Fort Hood, killing 13 people and wounding 30 others. Nidal Hasan, a Muslim U.S. Army major and psychiatrist, was alleged to be the gunman. He was shot several times and then arrested by civilian police officers Sergeants Mark Todd and Kimberly Munley. Much of the subsequent investigation was handled by III Corps, as the soldiers killed were under the corps' chain of command.

III Corps, commanded by LTG Robert W. Cone, assumed its final Iraq mission from I Corps from Joint Base Lewis–McChord, Washington in February 2010. As the core element of United States Forces – Iraq headquarters, III Corps oversaw a theater-wide transition from full-spectrum operations to stability operations. The corps changed the counterinsurgency (COIN) fight dynamic from partnered combat operations, led by brigade combat teams, to training, advising, and assisting operations, led by brigades organized as advise and assist brigades. The corps also completed the transition to complete Iraqi lead for security operations. During the deployment, III Corps reduced the amount of aviation assets in Iraq, resulting in one enhanced combat aviation brigade with six maneuver battalions having responsibility for the entire joint operations area. III Corps also oversaw the reduction of the force in Iraq from 110,000 to 50,000 U.S. personnel by 1 Sept. 2010, which established the conditions for the end of Operation Iraqi Freedom and the transition to Operation New Dawn. XVIII Airborne Corps from Fort Bragg, North Carolina, assumed the Iraq follow-on mission from III Corps in February 2011.

The corps saw its first action in Afghanistan when it deployed to Kabul in early April 2013. The corps, under the command of LTG Mark A. Milley, replaced the U.S. V Corps from Stuttgart, Germany, in May 2013 and assumed the mission of the International Security Assistance Force (ISAF) Joint Command, or IJC, which was responsible for day-to-day operations throughout Afghanistan. During the corps' deployment, IJC oversaw Milestone 13/Tranche 5 ceremony on 18 June 2013, which marked the official transition of full responsibility for nationwide security operations from ISAF to the Government of the Islamic Republic of Afghanistan. After the Milestone 13 ceremony, IJC transitioned from Coalition-led combat operations to Afghan-led combat operations and Coalition forces providing training, advice, and assistance. The ANSF, officially less than three years old, reached its peak of more than 350,000 members and conducted more than 70 major operations in more than 22 provinces. In November 2013, IJC forces provided technical support to the ANSF as it secured the Loya Jirga, a country-wide gathering of Afghan local leaders and officials, in Kabul. The Loya Jirga successfully laid the groundwork for a U.S.-Afghanistan Bilateral Security Agreement. During the deployment, III Corps also oversaw the drawdown of U.S. forces from more than 80,000 to 34,000 by 1 Feb. 2014. XVIII Airborne Corps from Fort Bragg, North Carolina, assumed the ISAF Joint Command mission from III Corps in March 2014.

On 13 October 2020, the III Corps commander launched Operation People First at Fort Hood, Fort Bliss, Fort Carson, Fort Riley, and other III Corps units.

In 2021, about 1,000 soldiers of III Corps were selected in order to assist with the processing and housing of Special Immigrant Visa applicants after the 2021 Kabul airlift, moving task forces to Fort Bliss and Fort McCoy, Wisconsin.

== Organization ==
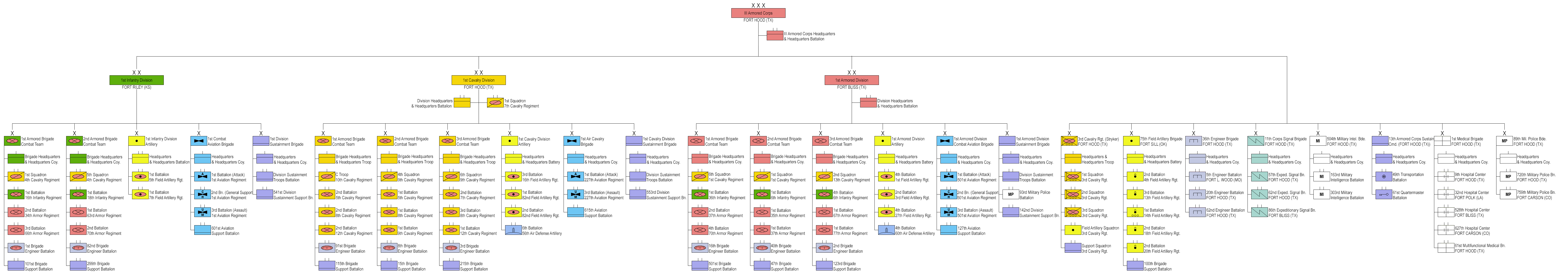
III Armored Corps organization as of October 2026 (click to enlarge)

- III Armored Corps, at Fort Hood (TX)
  - III Armored Corps Headquarters and Headquarters Battalion, at Fort Hood (TX)
  - 1st Infantry Division, at Fort Riley (KS)
  - 1st Cavalry Division, at Fort Hood (TX)
  - 1st Armored Division, at Fort Bliss (TX)
  - 1st Medical Brigade, at Fort Hood (TX)
  - 11th Corps Signal Brigade, at Fort Hood (TX)
  - 13th Armored Corps Sustainment Command, at Fort Hood (TX)
  - 75th Field Artillery Brigade, at Fort Sill (OK)
  - 89th Military Police Brigade, at Fort Hood (TX)
  - 504th Military Intelligence Brigade, at Fort Hood (TX)

== List of Commanding Generals ==
- William M. Wright June 1916 – July 1918
- Robert Lee Bullard July 1918 – October 1918
- John L. Hines October 1918 – July 1919
- Walter K. Wilson December 1940 – July 1941
- Joseph W. Stilwell July 1941 – December 1941
- Walter K. Wilson Sr. December 1941 – April 1942
- John P. Lucas April 1942 – May 1943
- Harold R. Bull June 1943 – October 1943
- John Millikin October 1943 – 17 March 1945
- James A. Van Fleet March 1945 – February 1946
- Ira T. Wyche February 1946 – May 1946
- John W. Leonard June 1946 – July 1946
- John M. Devine July 1946 – October 1946
- Leland S. Hobbs October 1946 – August 1947
- James G. Christiansen September 1947 – June 1949
- Albert C. Smith June 1949 – October 1950
- Williston B. Palmer November 1950 – December 1950
- William B. Kean March 1951 – July 1952
- Ira P. Swift August 1952 – April 1953
- William S. Biddle October 1953 – April 1954
- Hobart R. Gay April 1954 – October 1954
- Thomas L. Harrold October 1954 – June 1956
- William N. Gillmore June 1956 - August 1957
- William S. Biddle August 1957 – March 1959
- Earle G. Wheeler March 1959 – March 1960
- Edward G. Farrand April 1960 – June 1961
- John A. Beall Jr. September 1961 – April 1962
- Thomas W. Dunn April 1962 – October 1963
- Harvey J. Jablonsky November 1963 – January 1964
- Harvey H. Fischer January 1964 – February 1965
- Ralph E. Haines Jr. March 1965 – April 1967
- George R. Mather June 1967 – July 1968
- Beverley E. Powell September 1968 – July 1971
- George P. Seneff Jr. July 1971 – September 1973
- Allen M. Burdett Jr. September 1973 – March 1975
- Robert M. Shoemaker March 1975 – November 1977
- Marvin D. Fuller November 1977 – January 1980
- Richard E. Cavazos January 1980 – February 1982
- Walter F. Ulmer Jr. February 1982 – June 1985
- Crosbie E. Saint June 1985 – June 1988
- Richard G. Graves June 1988 – June 1991
- Horace G. Taylor June 1991 – October 1993
- Paul E. Funk October 1993 – December 1995
- Thomas A. Schwartz December 1995 – August 1998
- Leon J. LaPorte August 1998 – August 2001
- Burwell B. Bell III August 2001 – November 2002
- Thomas F. Metz February 2003 – May 2006
- Raymond T. Odierno May 2006 – July 2008
- Rick Lynch July 2008 – September 2009
- Robert W. Cone September 2009 – April 2011
- Donald M. Campbell Jr. April 2011 – 2012
- Mark A. Milley 2012 – 2014
- Sean B. MacFarland 2014 – 2017
- Paul E. Funk II 2017 – 2019
- Robert P. White 2019 – 2022
- Sean C. Bernabe 2022 – 2024
- Kevin Admiral 2024 – present

== Honors ==
The corps received five campaign streamers in World War I and four campaign streamers in World War II. It also received two campaign streamers and two unit awards during the War on Terrorism.

=== Unit decorations ===
Ribbon	Award	Year	Notes
	Meritorious Unit Commendation (Army)	2004–2005	for service in Central Asia
	Meritorious Unit Commendation (Army)	2007–2008	for service in Central Asia
	Meritorious Unit Commendation (Army)	2010–2011	for service in Central Asia
	Meritorious Unit Commendation (Army)	2012–2013	for service in Central Asia
	Joint Meritorious Unit Award	2019-2020	for service in Iraq / Syria

=== Campaign streamers ===
Conflict	Streamer	Year(s)
World War I	Aisne-Marne	1918
World War I	Oise-Marne	1918
World War I	Meuse-Argonne	1918
World War I	Champagne	1918
World War I	Lorraine	1918
World War II	Normandy	1944
World War II	Northern France	1944
World War II	Rhineland	1945
World War II	Central Europe	1945
Operation Iraqi Freedom	Iraq	2004–2005
Operation Iraqi Freedom	Iraq	2007–2008
Operation Iraqi Freedom	Iraq	2009–2010
Operation New Dawn	Iraq	2010–2011

== Sources ==
- Axelrod, Alan (2006), Patton: A Biography, Palgrave Macmillan, ISBN 978-1-4039-7139-5
- Neumann, Brian F. (2019), Occupation and Demobilization 1918-1923 (PDF), U.S. Army Center of Military History
- Stewart, Richard W. (2005), American military history ([Textbook version] ed.), Washington, D.C.: Center of Military History, U.S. Army, ISBN 0-16-072362-0, OCLC 60767166
- Wilson, John B. (1987), Armies, corps, divisions, and separate brigades, Center of Military History, U.S. Army, OCLC 15018137
- United States Army, Center of Military History (1992b) [1948], United States Army in the World War: 1917-1919, vol. 5, Washington, DC: U.S. Government Printing Office, OCLC 1303020
