= 75th Field Artillery Brigade =

Field artillery brigade of the III Armored Corps, US Army

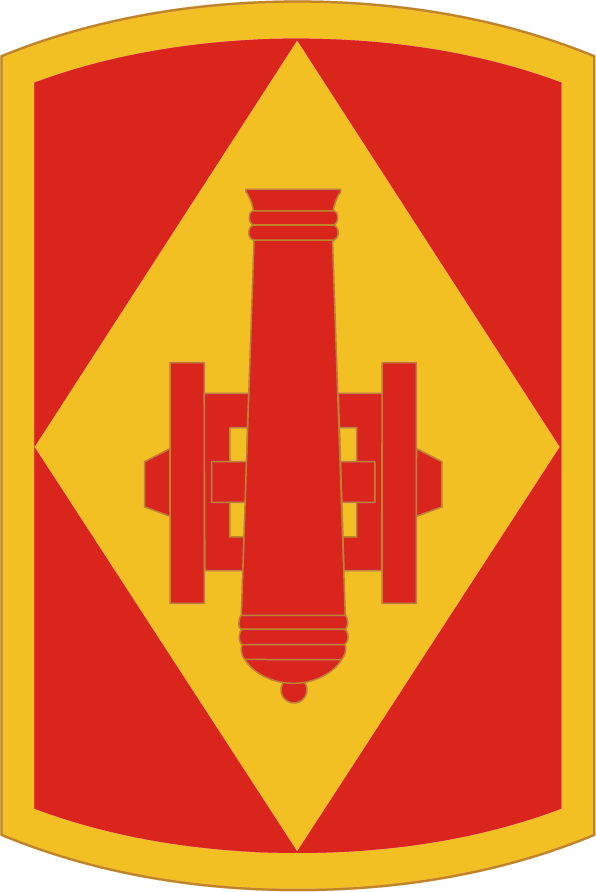
- Shoulder Sleeve Insignia
- Active: 1921
- Country: United States
- Branch: United States Army
- Type: Field artillery
- Role: Corps Force Fires Headquarters
- Part of: III Armored Corps
- Garrison/HQ: Fort Sill
- Nickname: Diamond Brigade
- Motto: Tough as Diamonds
- Battle honours: Operations Desert Shield and Desert Storm, 1990-1991

Commanders
- Current commander: COL Paul Lashley
- Command sergeant major: CSM Garry S. Pruitt
- Notable commanders: Thomas Vandal; Joseph Harrington; Michael R. Eastman; Richard McPhee

Insignia
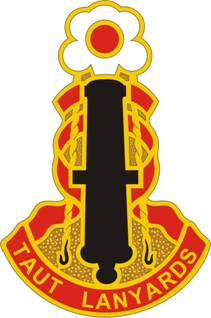
- Distinctive Unit Insignia

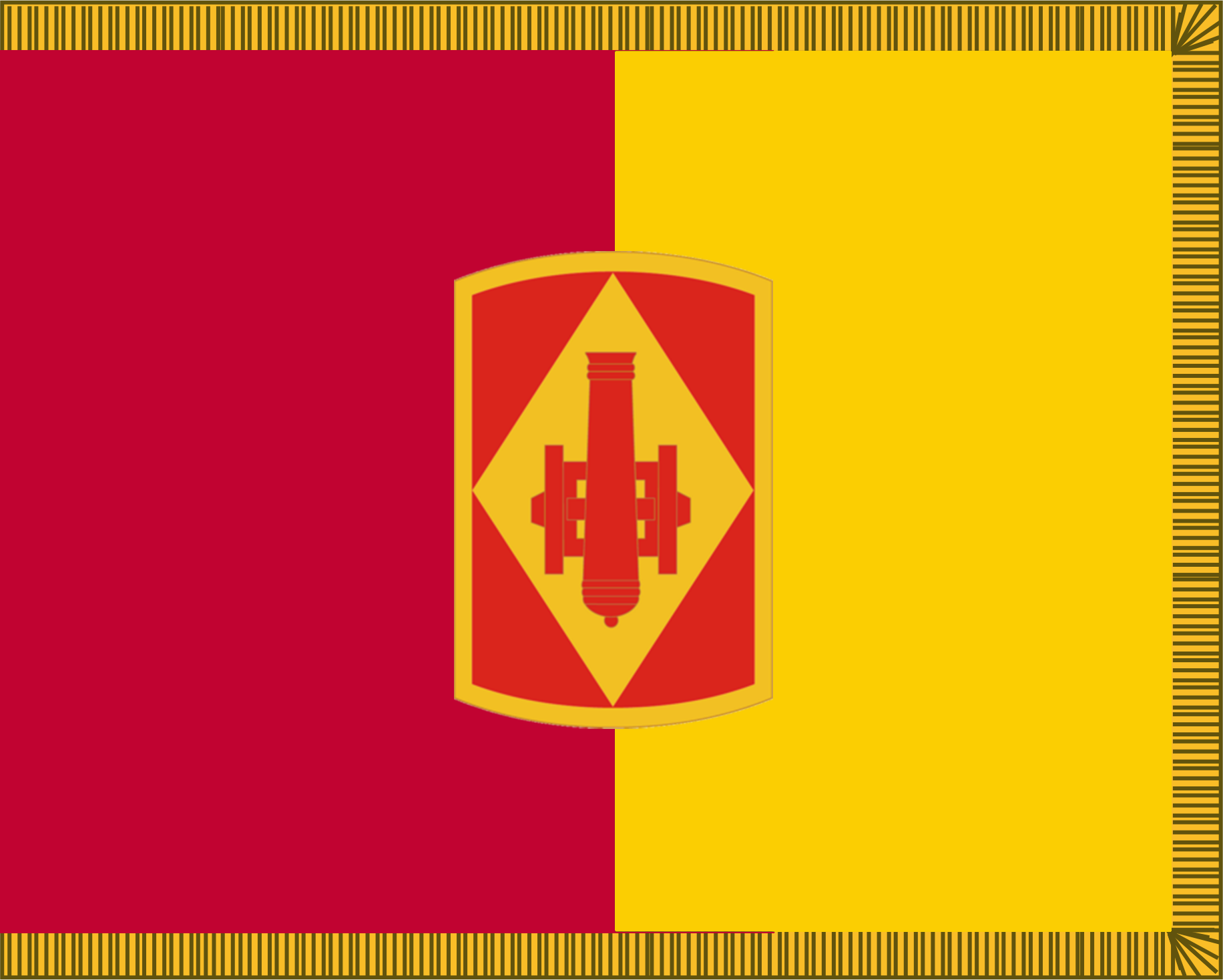
- 75th Field Artillery Brigade Flag

The 75th Field Artillery Brigade (75th FAB) is an artillery brigade in the United States Army. It is currently based in Fort Sill, Oklahoma and supports the III Armored Corps. The brigade is officially tasked to train and prepares for combat; on orders deploys to any area of operations to plan, synchronize and execute combined, and joint fires and effects. Integrate attached ground and air maneuver forces and on order function as a maneuver headquarters in support of full spectrum operations.

== History ==
=== 75th Coast Artillery Brigade (Antiaircraft) (present 75th Field Artillery Brigade) ===
Headquarters and Headquarters Battery, 75th Field Artillery Brigade was originally formed within the Organized Reserve as the 509th Coast Artillery (Antiaircraft) on 21 July 1921, at Seattle, Washington. It was inactivated on 1 October 1933 at Seattle, Washington and allotted to the Regular Army. On 1 July 1940, it was activated and re-designated as the 75th Coast Artillery (Antiaircraft) at Fort Lewis, Washington.

After reorganization on 20 February 1944, the unit became Headquarters and Headquarters Battery, 75th Antiaircraft Artillery Group. The unit was then inactivated 12 December 1944 at Camp Howze, Texas. Re-designated 10 January 1967 as Headquarters and Headquarters Battery, 75th Artillery Group, it was activated 1 February 1967 at Fort Irwin, California. The unit was re-designated 15 March 1972 as Headquarters and Headquarter Battery, 75th Artillery Group. Finally it was re-designated 16 March 1981 as Headquarters and Headquarters Battery, 75th Field Artillery Brigade.

The 75th Field Artillery Brigade deployed to Saudi Arabia in September 1990. Initially task organized under XVIII Airborne Corps Artillery, the brigade reinforced the 101st Airborne Division (Air Assault) in the covering force area during Operation Desert Shield. The brigade was task organized with four battalions: two 155 mm self-propelled, one 8-inch self-propelled and one MLRS, which had earlier detached a battery. The 101st also attached their target acquisition detachment to the brigade, to take advantage of the digital connectivity provided by the TACFIRE system. The brigade positioned its two 155mm battalions forward to support the 101st Division's aviation brigades, and established a reinforcing network to an MLRS battalion in 212th Field Artillery Brigade. The brigade was never engaged during the covering force mission.

In January 1991, the brigade was task organized under VII Corps Artillery in support of offensive operations. On 15 January 1991, the brigade moved over 100 miles west and joined the 1st Infantry Division (Mechanized) at Tactical Assembly Area Roosevelt. During the movement, Battery A, 6th Battalion, 27th Field Artillery conducted an ATACMS "hip shoot" in support of the air campaign. From 16 – 24 February 1991, the brigade's units participated in artillery raids into Kuwait. On 24 February 1991, the brigade began to move with the 1st Infantry Division into Kuwait to fire preparation fires in support of the division's breach. At 1300hrs, the division was informed of the CENTCOM commander's decision to execute early, and fired a shortened (30 minutes instead of the planned 2-1/2 hours) preparation beginning at 1430hrs. The brigade assumed control of the division's fires as the 1st DIVARTY moved through the breach, then returned control to the DIVARTY and began its own movement through the breach. Reassigned to reinforce the 1st Armored Division Artillery, which had already moved over 100 miles ahead, the brigade moved forward in the "Mother of all Road Marches" and finally caught up with the 1st Armored DIVARTY two days later, in time to provide support for the final two days of the war, including combat with two Republican Guard divisions. The brigade fired more than 6,000 howitzer rounds, 1,100 rockets and 25 ATACMS missiles. The brigade completed redeployment to Fort Sill in April 1991.

During Operation Iraqi Freedom I, the brigade's units served well. HHB, 75th Field Artillery Brigade again proved their versatility when in February 2003, deployed as the Army's first ever Exploitation Task Force. The HHB was task organized under CFLCC and searched for Weapons of Mass Destruction during Operation Enduring Freedom and Operation Iraqi Freedom. HHB, 75th Brigade returned successfully with no casualties from Operation Iraqi Freedom in June 2003.

6–27th Field Artillery Battalion organized under the 4th Infantry Division, deployed to Operation Iraqi Freedom in April 2003. 6–27th Field Artillery was then subsequently reassigned under 17th Field Artillery Brigade in support of Task Force Bullet II where the unit began missions of hauling captured enemy ammunition. In 8 months of deployment, 6–27 FA traversed over 13,000 miles hauling in excess of 1.3 million pounds of captured enemy ammunition. 6–27 redeployed from the Central Command area of responsibility in November 2003.

Charlie Battery, 3-13th Field Artillery Battalion, deployed to Operation Iraqi Freedom in April 2008. 3-13th Field Artillery conducted detainee security operations at Theater Internment Facility (TIF) Bucca for the first few months of their deployment. A shift in mission, saw the battery providing a Quick Reaction Force (QRF) of several platoons, until the batteries eventual return in July, 2009.

1–17th Field Artillery Battalion organized under 4th Infantry Division and fired in direct support of the Division's Cavalry Squadron, 1–10 CAV. 1–17 supported 1–10 CAV from the crossing of the berm until the culmination of major combat operations. 1–17 was then organized under 2nd Brigade, 4th ID, and assigned an area of operations along the Iranian border where it served in training the Iraqi Border Police, Iraqi National Guard, and standing up of three city governments. 1–17 redeployed from OIF in March 2004. In late 2005, the unit again deployed in support of Operation Iraqi Freedom, with most of the unit providing security and escort missions out of LSA Anaconda. Alpha Battery 1-17 was the final battery to return from this second tour, arriving at Fort Sill in January 2007. The unit also deployed 2010–2011 to the Afghanistan Theater of Operations, in support of Operation Enduring Freedom.

1-17th was awarded the Meritorious Unit Citation by, then Secretary of Defense, Donald Rumsfeld during their second deployment to Iraq as a result of the unit's conduct and actions during the 2005-2007 deployment.

1–77th Field Artillery Battalion served as III (US) CORPS strategic hedge, standing ready to deploy to any major contingency operations that may have arisen. In May 2004, 1–77 deployed to Fort Lewis, Washington where it served in evaluating ROTC Cadets in their summer training. They returned to Fort Sill in August 2004.

On 5 November 2004, HHB (-), 75th Field Artillery Brigade deployed to Baghdad, Iraq in order to serve as the 75th Force Field Artillery Headquarters attached to the 1st Cavalry Division (CD) in support of Operation Iraqi Freedom (OIF) II. The brigade mission was to quickly deploy, conduct RSOI, force protection, and establish Command and Control (C2) of 1st CD's counter-fire operations. The 75th Brigade provided C2, intelligence planning, fire control, and the integration of lethal and non-lethal effects to maximize intelligence based counter mortar/rocket operations.

In September 2006, the 75th Field Artillery Brigade was re-organized and renamed the 75th Fires Brigade, and assigned to habitually support the 1st Infantry Division. The fires brigade was initially organized with a headquarters and headquarters battery, two MLRS battalions, a 155 mm self-propelled Paladin battalion, a target acquisition battery and a brigade support battalion.

The brigade was awarded a Meritorious Unit Commendation for its service while attached to the 1st Armored Division from 18 March 2008 – 9 December 2008.

In 2013, the Army announced force structure decisions to execute end strength reductions. As part of these reductions, the brigade's cannon battalion was inactivated in 2014, while the target acquisition battery was reduced to a platoon assigned to the brigade HHB. Also in 2014, the brigade was redesignated once again as the 75th Field Artillery Brigade. With the inactivation of 214th Fires Brigade in June 2015, the 2nd Battalion, 4th Field Artillery Regiment and the 1st Battalion, 14th Field Artillery Regiment were assigned to the brigade.

=== Other organizations designated "75th Field Artillery Brigade" ===
Another organization designated "75th Field Artillery Brigade" existed in the Army from 1940 to 1943, but has no lineal relation to the present 75th Field Artillery Brigade. In 1940, the Army re-examined its need for horse cavalry, and cavalry divisions were disbanded and their subordinate units disbanded or converted to other types of units, including field artillery. The 75th Field Artillery Brigade was constituted in the National Guard on 30 October 1940, allotted to the state of Tennessee. and assigned to the VII Corps. The Headquarters Battery was concurrently organized at Lebanon, Tennessee. On 24 February 1941, the Group was inducted into federal service and moved to Camp Forrest, Tennessee, where the Headquarters was activated and subordinate units were assigned.

- 168th Field Artillery Regiment (155 mm) (Colorado National Guard). Previously assigned to the 24th Cavalry Division as a 75 mm gun unit until relieved on 1 November 1940 and allotment concurrently changed to 155 mm howitzers. Inducted into federal service 24 February 1941 and moved to Camp Forrest, Tennessee.
- 181st Field Artillery Regiment (155 mm) (Tennessee National Guard). Constituted in the National Guard on 1 October 1940 and concurrently organized by conversion and redesignation of the 109th Cavalry Regiment, Tennessee National Guard, previously part of the 24th Cavalry Division. Inducted into federal service 24 February 1941 and moved to Camp Forrest, Tennessee.
- 191st Field Artillery Regiment (155 mm) (Tennessee National Guard). Constituted in the National Guard on 4 December 1939, allotted to the state of Tennessee, with the 2nd Battalion concurrently organized at Maryville, Tennessee by redesignation of the 2nd Battalion, 115th Field Artillery Regiment. The 3rd Battalion was organized at Kingsport, Tennessee, on 15 February 1940. The Headquarters was organized on 20 February 1940 at Nashville, Tennessee. The 1st Battalion was organized on 24 February 1941 at Nashville. Inducted into federal service 24 February 1941 and moved to Camp Forrest, Tennessee.

On 26 December 1941, the brigade was transferred to Camp Roberts, California. On 23 July 1943, it was assigned to the IV Corps. On 6 August 1943, it was transferred to Fort Lewis, Washington, where it was redesignated as Headquarters and Headquarters Battery, IV Corps Artillery. It was inactivated at the New York Port of Embarkation on 13 October 1945 after returning from combat in the Mediterranean Theater of Operations.

== Composition ==
The 75th Field Artillery Brigade is currently composed of the following units. All the units are located at Fort Sill.

- 75th Field Artillery Brigade
  - Headquarters and Headquarters Battery (HHB), 75th Field Artillery Brigade (75th FA BDE)
  - 2nd Battalion, 4th Field Artillery Regiment (2-4th FAR "Deep Attack"), (M270A1 MLRS) Multiple Launch Rocket System
    - Headquarters and Headquarters Battery (HHB) (Headhunters)
    - A Battery (Outlaws)
    - B Battery (Bulldogs)
    - 696th Forward Support Company (696th FSC) (Darkhorse)
  - 3rd Battalion, 13th Field Artillery Regiment (3-13th FAR), (M270A1 MLRS) Multiple Launch Rocket System
    - Headquarters and Headquarters Battery (HHB)
    - A Battery (Alcatraz)
    - B Battery (Bandits)
    - 66th Forward Support Company (66th FSC) (Renegades)
  - 1st Battalion, 14th Field Artillery Regiment (1-14th FAR), (M142 HIMARS) High Mobility Artillery Rocket System
    - Headquarters and Headquarters Battery (HHB)
    - A Battery
    - B Battery
    - 578th Forward Support Company (578th FSC)
  - 2nd Battalion, 18th Field Artillery Regiment (2-18th FAR), (M270A1 MLRS) Multiple Launch Rocket System
    - Headquarters and Headquarters Battery (HHB) (Havoc)
    - A Battery (Able)
    - B Battery (Baker)
    - 69th Forward Support Company (69th FSC) (Spartan)
  - 2nd Battalion, 20th Field Artillery Regiment (2-20th FAR), (M270A1 MLRS) Multiple Launch Rocket System
    - Headquarters and Headquarters Battery (HHB)
    - A Battery
    - B Battery
    - 67th Forward Support Company (67th FSC)
  - 100th Brigade Support Battalion (100th BSB)
    - Headquarters and Service Company (HSC)
    - 15th Transportation Company (PLS)
    - 258th Network Support Company (258th NSC)
      - Retrans Platoon
      - STT/JNN Platoon

== Lineage and honors ==
=== Lineage ===
- Constituted 21 July 1921 in the Organized Reserves as the 509th Coast Artillery (Antiaircraft) and organized with headquarters at Seattle, Washington
- Inactivated 1 October 1933 at Seattle, Washington; concurrently withdrawn from the Organized Reserves and allotted to the Regular Army
- Redesignated 1 July 1940 as the 75th Coast Artillery and activated at Fort Lewis, Washington
- Headquarters and Headquarters Battery, 75th Coast Artillery, reorganized and redesignated 20 February 1944 as Headquarters and Headquarters Battery, 75th Antiaircraft Artillery Group (remainder of regiment – hereafter separate lineages)
- Headquarters and Headquarters Battery, 75th Antiaircraft Artillery Group, inactivated 12 December 1944 at Camp Howze, Texas
- Redesignated 10 January 1967 as Headquarters and Headquarters Battery, 75th Artillery Group
- Activated 1 February 1967 at Fort Irwin, California
- Redesignated 15 March 1972 as Headquarters and Headquarters Battery, 75th Field Artillery Group
- Redesignated 16 March 1981 as Headquarters and Headquarters Battery, 75th Field Artillery Brigade
- Reorganized and redesignated 18 September 2006 as Headquarters and Headquarters Battery, 75th Fires Brigade
- Redesignated 19 February 2014 as Headquarters and Headquarters Battery, 75th Field Artillery Brigade

=== Campaign participation credit ===
- Southwest Asia: Defense of Saudi Arabia; Liberation and Defense of Kuwait
- War on Terrorism: Campaigns to be determined

=== Decorations ===
- Meritorious Unit Commendation

== Gallery ==
M142 HIMARS assigned to the 1st Battalion, 14th Field Artillery Regiment in Kuwait. Jan. 27, 2021

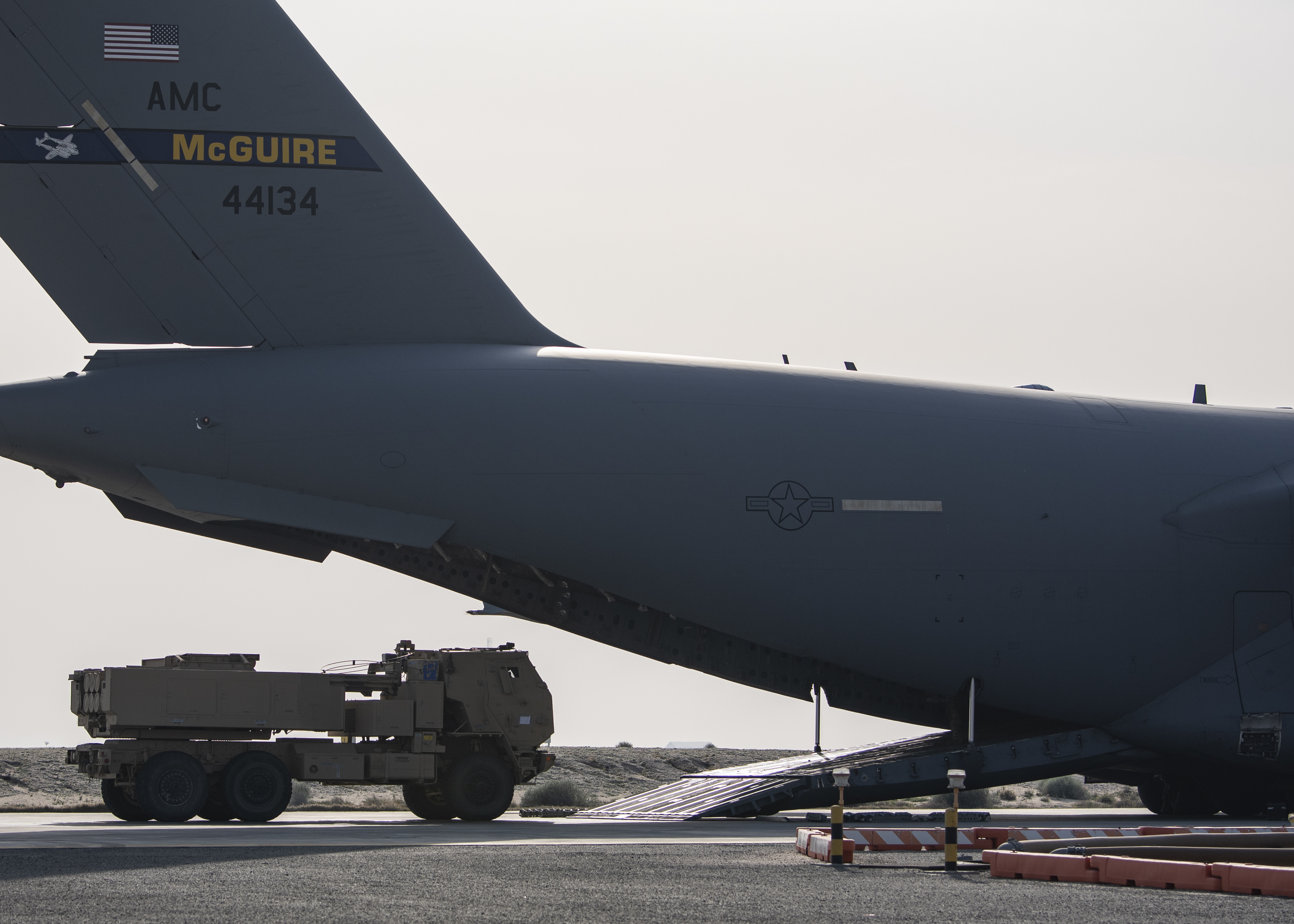

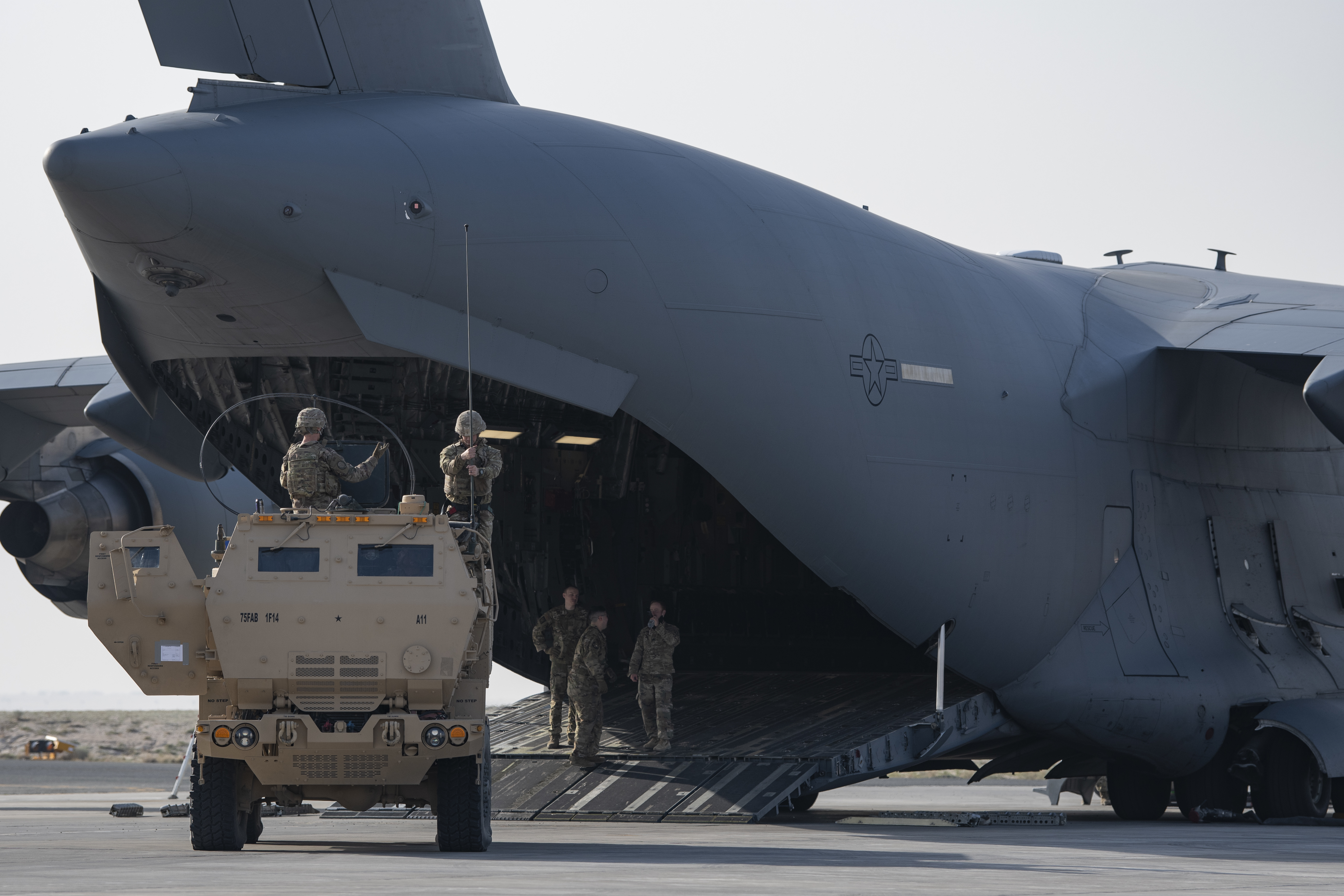

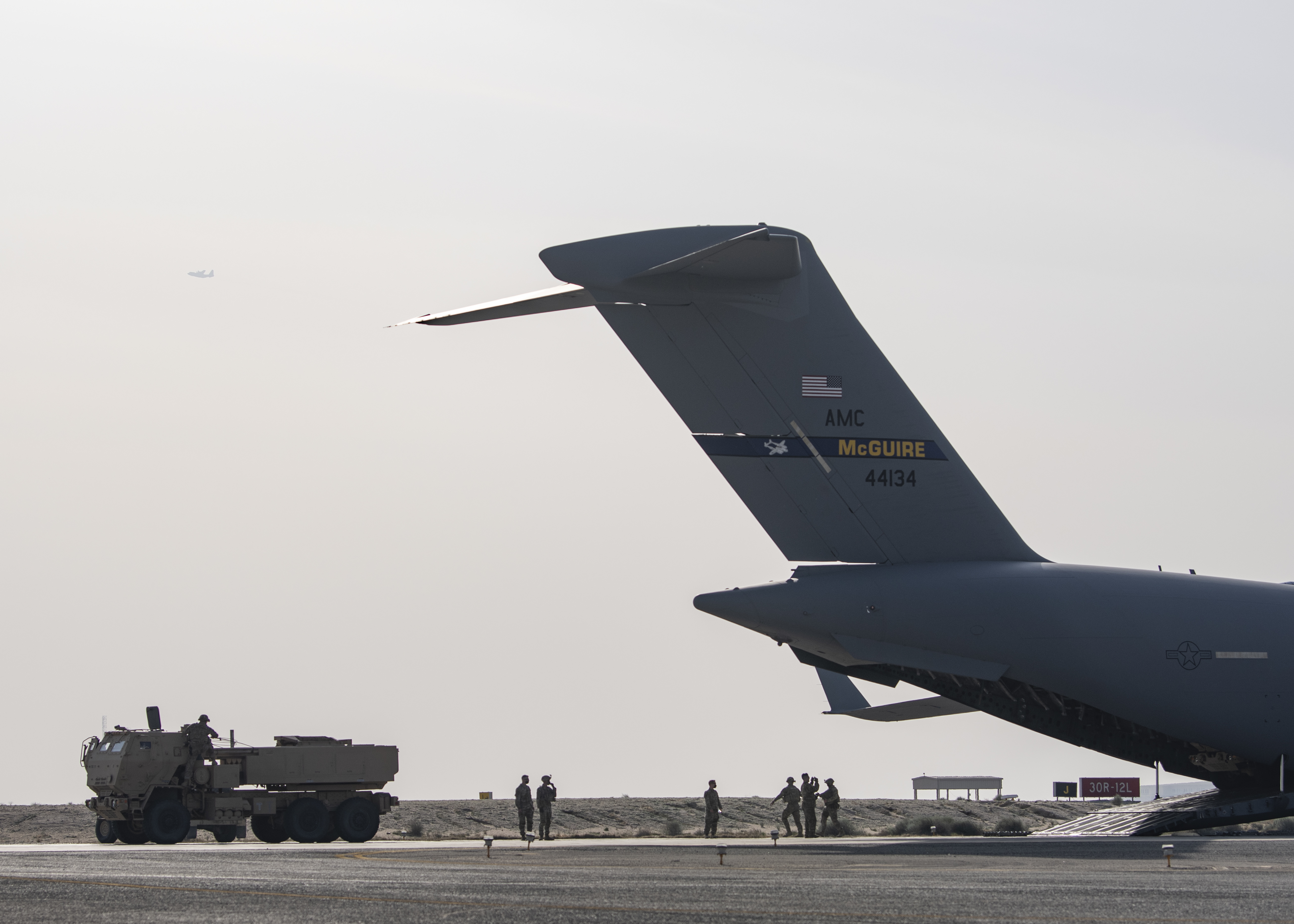

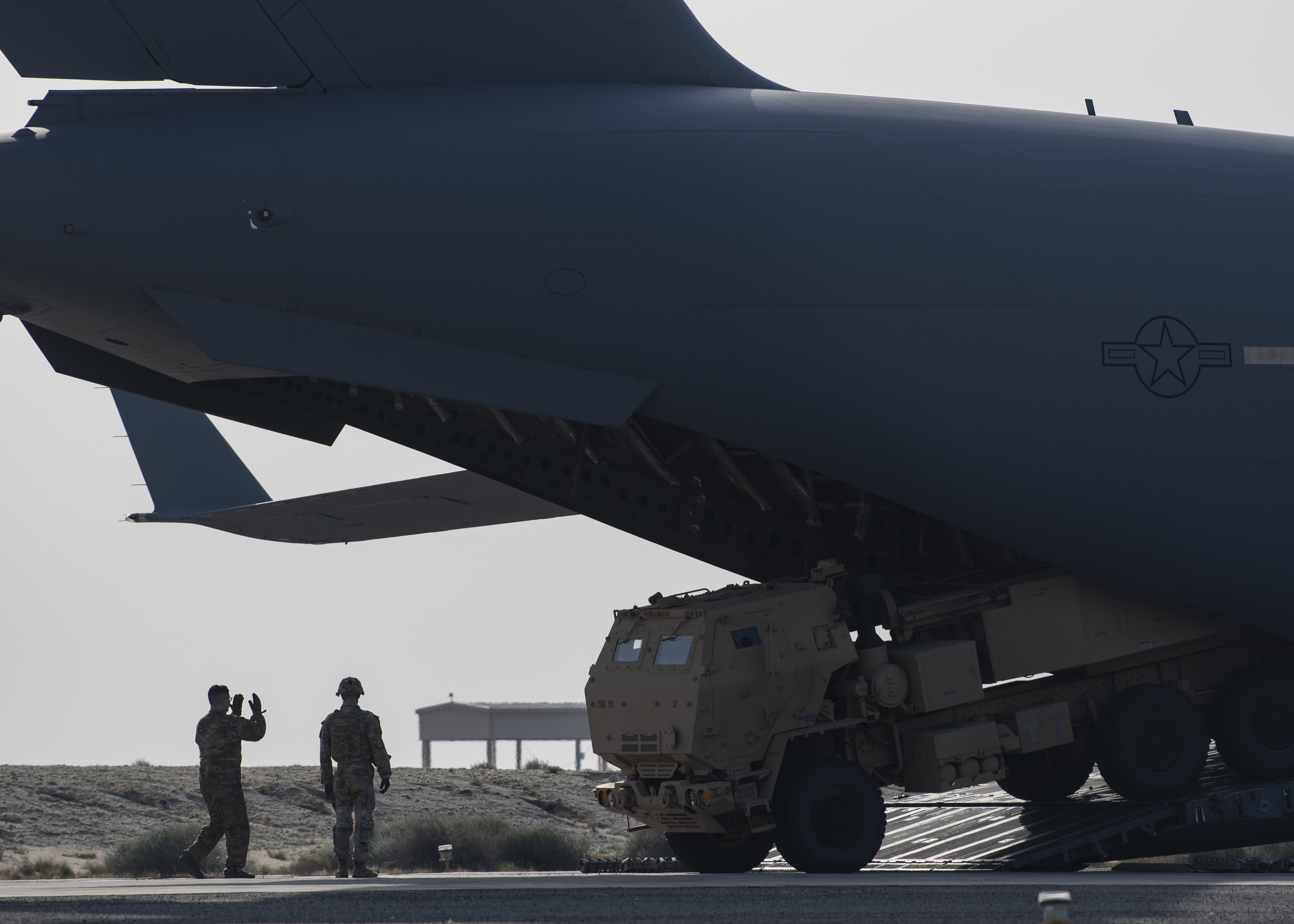

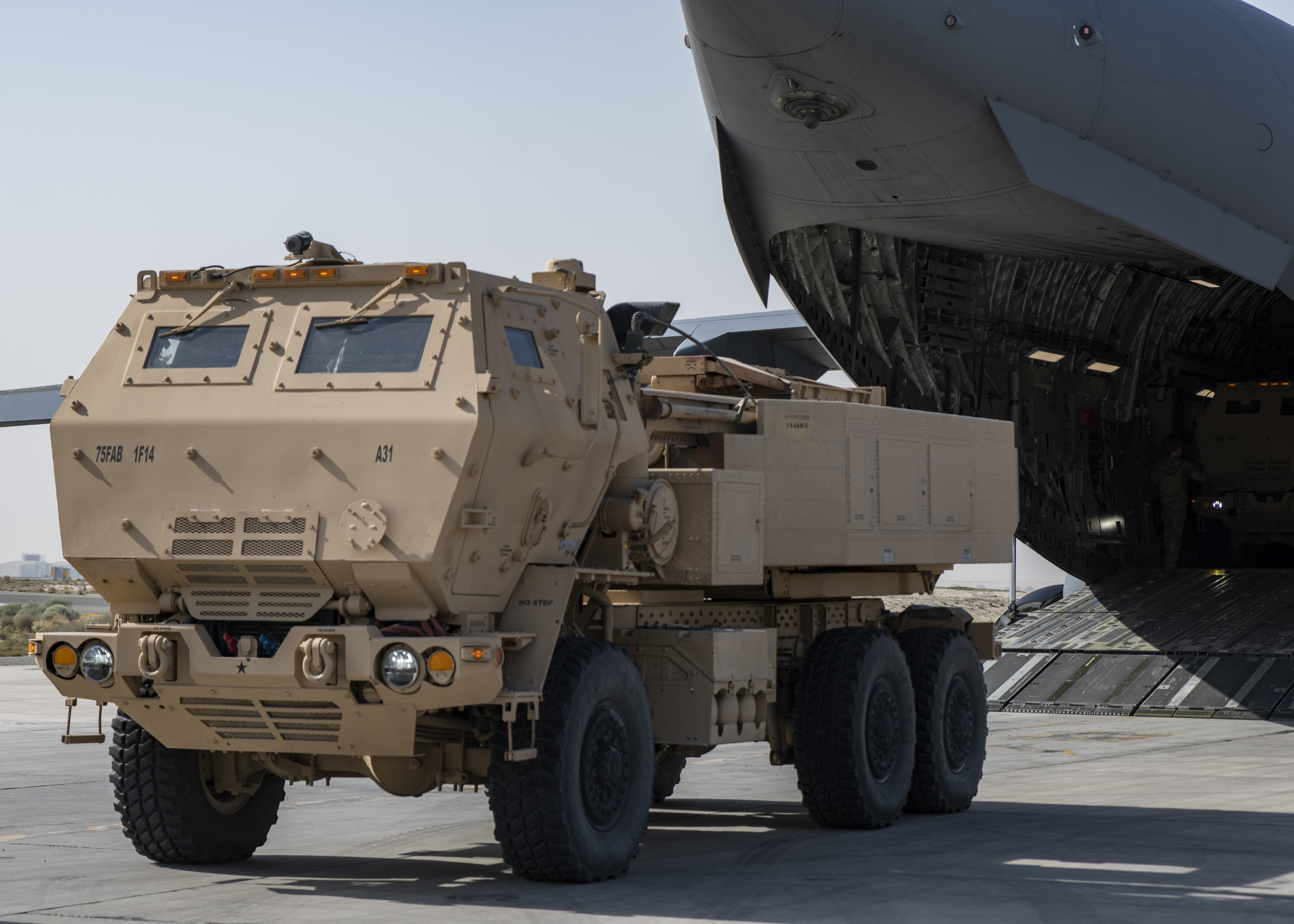

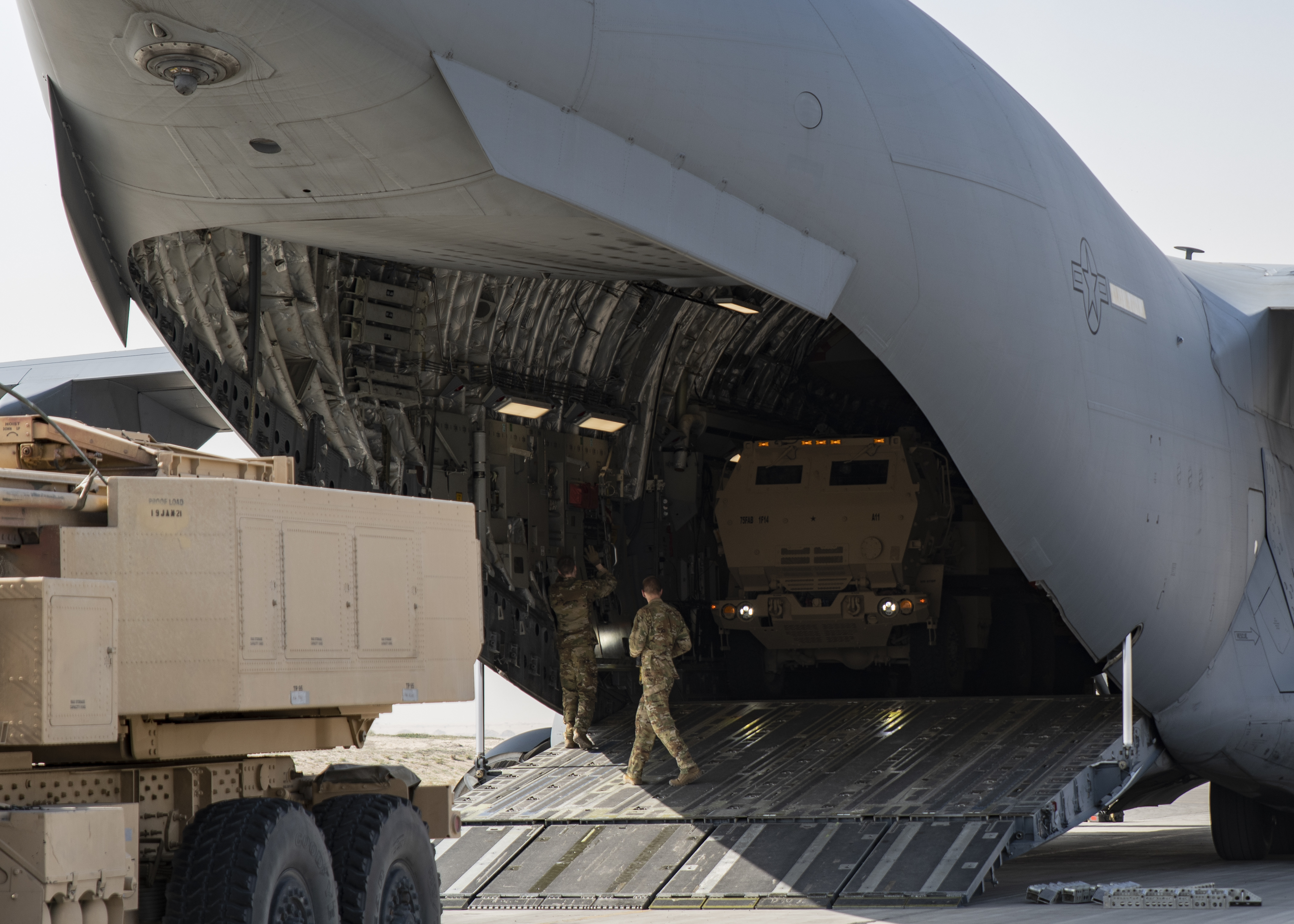

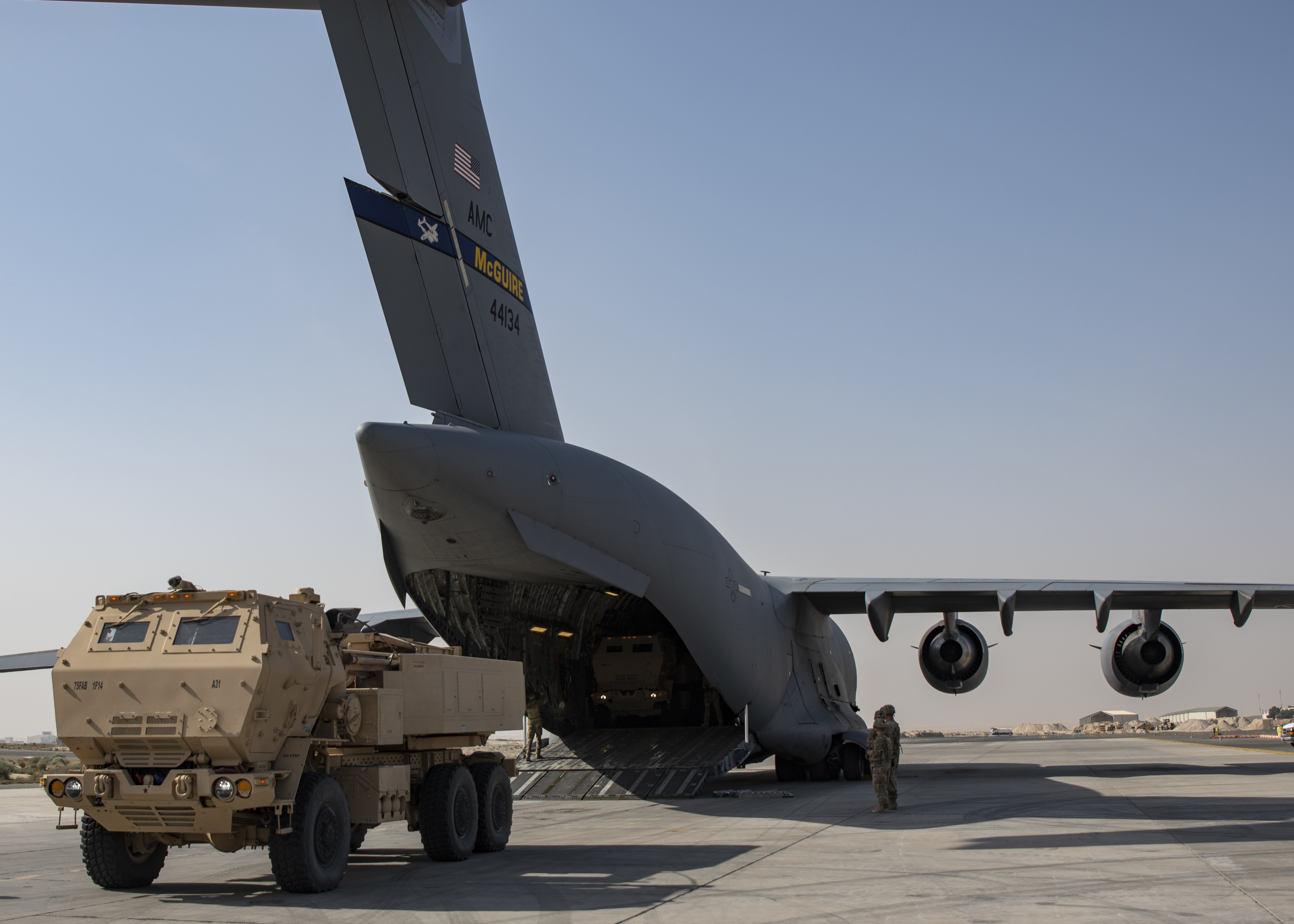

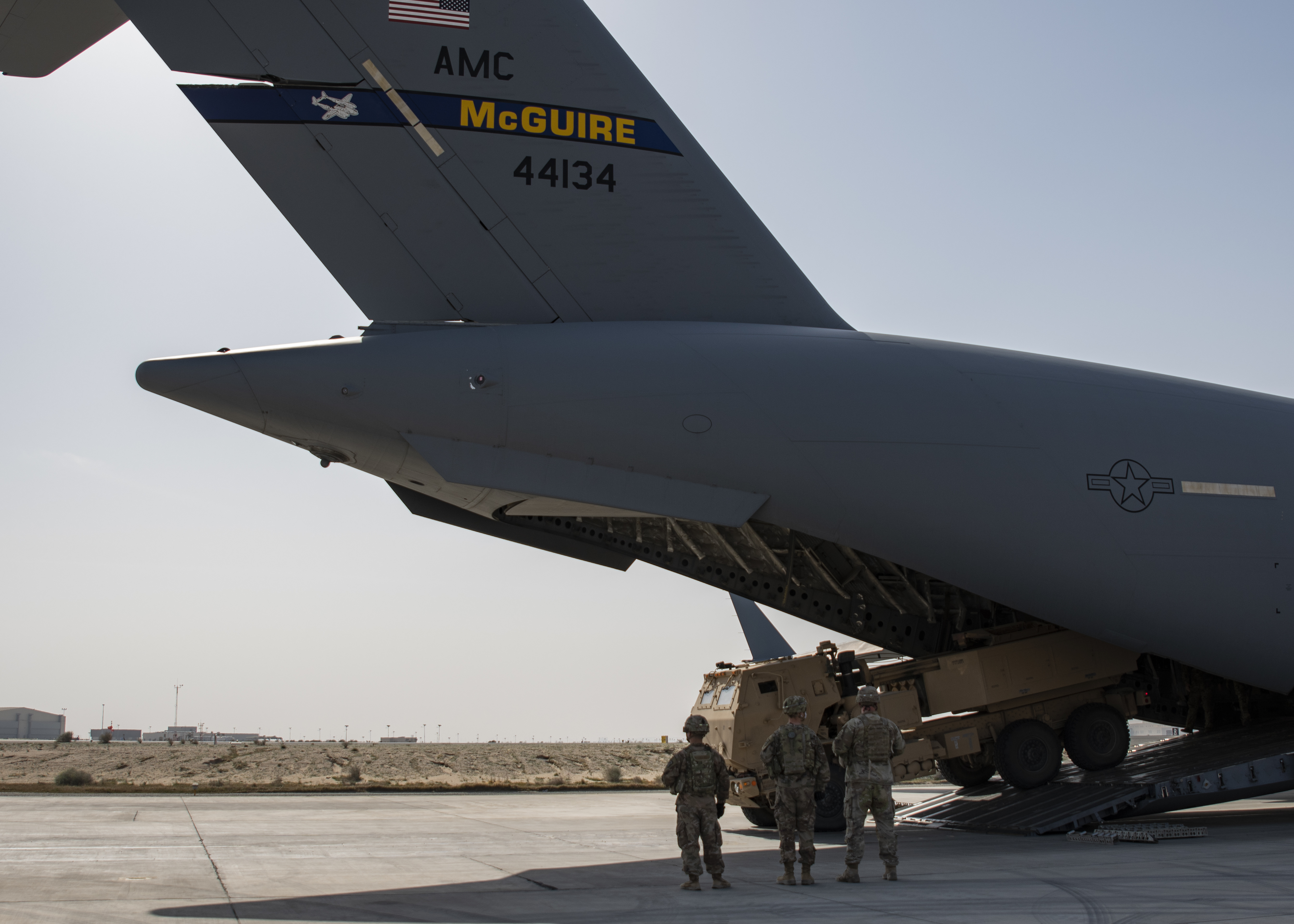

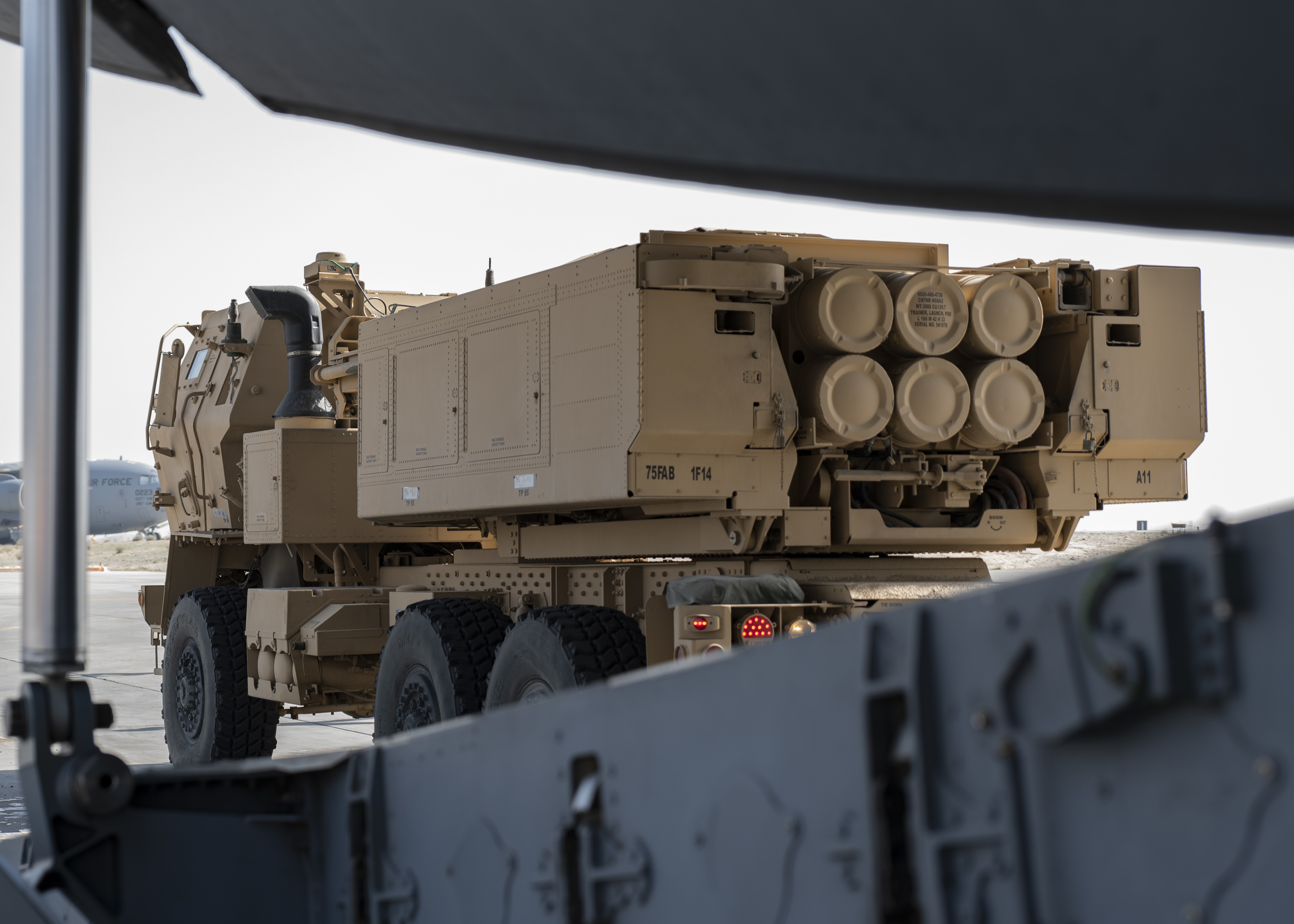
