= Walter F. Ulmer =

United States Army general

Walter F. Ulmer Jr.
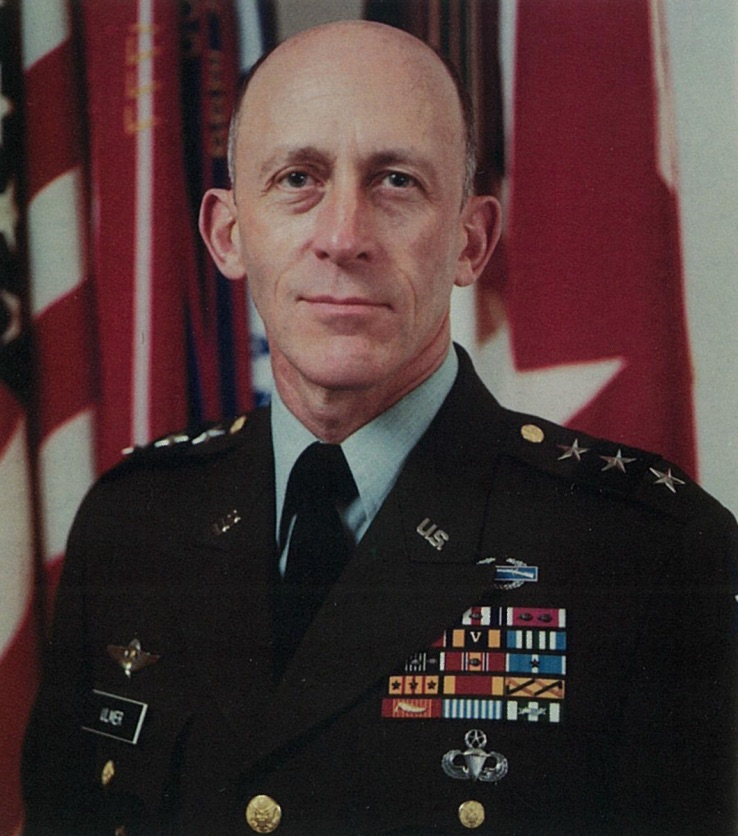
- Lieutenant General Walter F. Ulmer Jr.
- Born: April 2, 1929 (age 97); Bangor, Maine
- Military career
- Allegiance: United States of America
- Branch: United States Army
- Service years: 1952–1985
- Rank: Lieutenant General
- Commands: III Corps; 3rd Armored Division; 194th Armored Brigade
- Conflicts: Korean War; Vietnam War
- Awards: Distinguished Service Medal; Silver Star; Bronze Star Medal; Air Medal; Army Presidential Unit Citation

Walter Francis Ulmer Jr. (born April 2, 1929) is a retired lieutenant general in the United States Army.

== Military career ==
Born in Bangor, Maine, Walter Ulmer graduated from West Point in the Class of 1952. Commissioned a second lieutenant of Armor, he commanded companies in the 56th Amphibious Tank and Tractor Battalion in Korea, the 6th Tank Battalion, 24th Infantry Division in Japan, and the 325th Airborne Infantry Regiment of the 82nd Airborne Division. In 1958, he was assigned to the Department of Military Topography and Graphics at West Point, and, following that tour, he attended the Command and General Staff College. After graduation he deployed to Vietnam, serving with the U.S. Military Assistance Command and as senior advisor to a Vietnamese Infantry regiment. Upon his return to the United States, he held high-level staff positions and commanded the 1st Squadron, 17th Cavalry, 82nd Airborne Division from 1967 to 1968.

General Ulmer, as a Lt. Colonel, then attended the Army War College and was subsequently selected for duty on its faculty. There, at the direction of General William Westmoreland, in response to the My Lai Massacre by U.S. Army forces (and subsequent cover up by the Army chain of command), he was selected as a member of a three officer team that compiled a comprehensive and seminal study of leadership within the Army during the Vietnam War demonstrating a severe erosion of adherence to the Army's officer code of "Duty, Honor, Country". The report, entitled 'Study on Military Professionalism', had a profound influence on Army policies, beginning with Westmoreland's decision to end the policy that officers serving in Vietnam would be rotated into a different post after only six months.

In 1972, then-Colonel Ulmer returned to Vietnam, where he was Chief, Combat Assistance Team 70, during 62 days of intense combat in the Battle and Siege of An Loc. For its extraordinary heroism against a North Vietnamese force greatly outnumbering the Army Republic of Vietnam defenders, Combat Assistance Team 70 was awarded the Presidential Unit Citation. The citation documents the team's pivotal role in turning back the North Vietnamese Army's massive surprise offensive of 1972. In 1973, General Ulmer completed a master's degree in Regional Planning from Pennsylvania State University. Subsequently, he was commander of the 194th Armor Brigade and, then, Deputy Commander, U.S. Army Armor Center, Fort Knox. In 1975, Brigadier General Ulmer returned to West Point as the 56th Commandant of Cadets. In 1975, Ulmer served as Commandant of Cadets at the U.S. Military Academy at West Point, where he presided over the first admission of female cadets, and one of West Point's biggest embarrassments, the Class of 1977 cheating scandal involving several hundred of the junior classmen (Ulmer recommended expulsion of all cadets found guilty of cheating on an electrical engineering exam, but was overruled).

General Ulmer commanded the 3rd Armored Division in Germany and, later, during his service as Commanding General, III Corps, Fort Hood, Texas. Following promotion to lieutenant general, he commanded III Corps from 1982 to 1985 In 1985, General Ulmer retired after thirty-three years of distinguished military service. His awards and decorations include the Silver Star with Oak Leaf Cluster, the Distinguished Service Medal, the Bronze Star with Oak Leaf Cluster, the Air Medal with "V" Device, and decorations awarded by the Republic of Korea, the Republic of Vietnam, and the Federal Republic of Germany.

== Awards and decorations ==
Lieutenant General Ulmer's awards and decorations include:

- Distinguished Service Medal
- Silver Star with one oak leaf cluster
- Bronze Star with one oak leaf cluster
- Air Medal (with Valor Device)
- Army Presidential Unit Citation
- Vietnam Service Medal
- Overseas Service Ribbon

Joint Service Commendation Medal Army Commendation Medal with three oak leaf clusters Legion of Merit with three oak leaf clusters
