= 214th Fires Brigade =

- Shoulder sleeve insignia
- Active: 1944–2015
- Country: (United States)
- Branch: United States Army
- Type: Field artillery
- Role: Fire Support Coordination and Control
- Size: Brigade
- Garrison/HQ: Fort Sill

Insignia
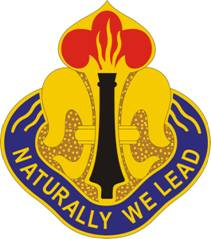
- Distinctive unit insignia

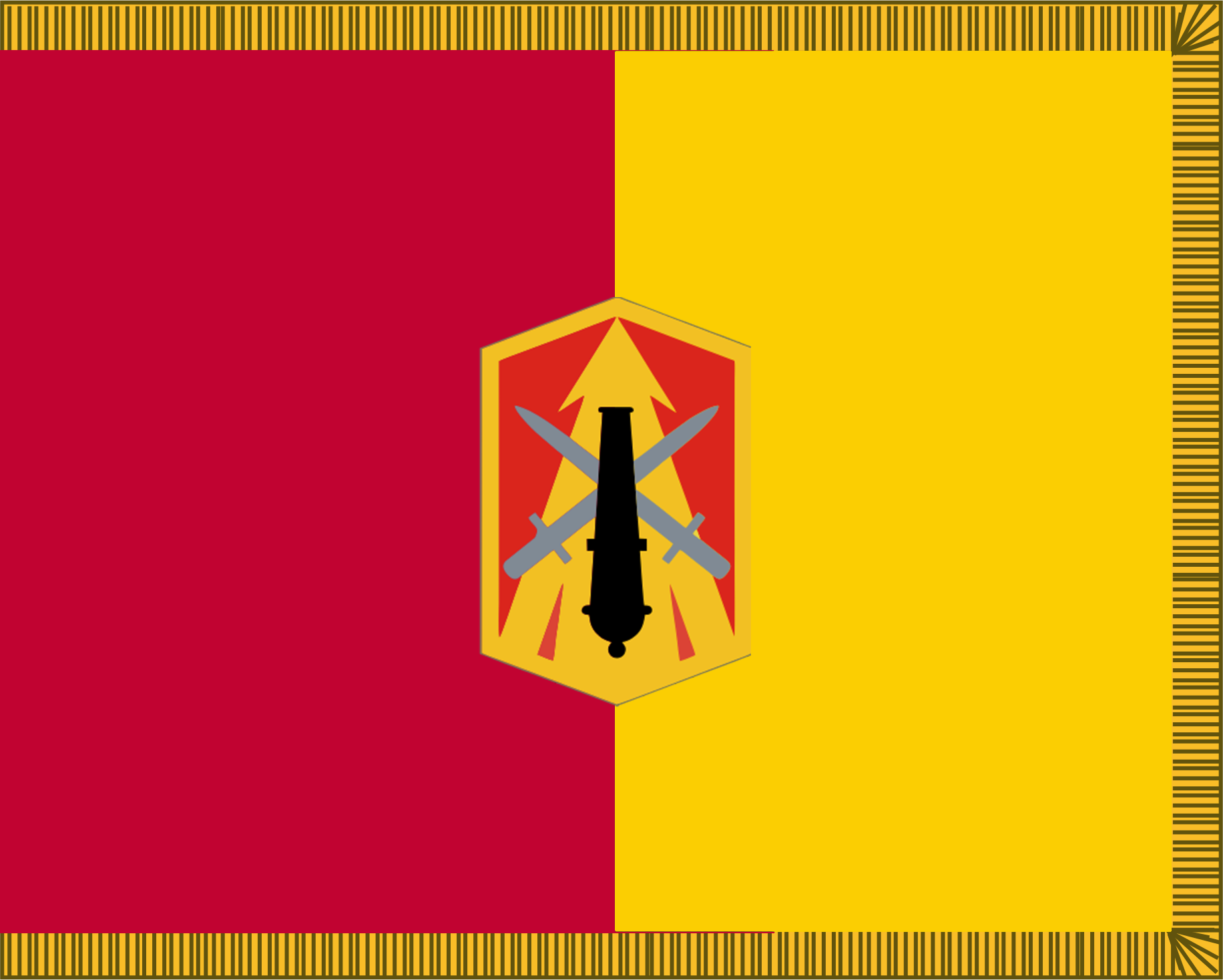
- 214th Field Artillery Brigade Flag

The 214th Fires Brigade is an inactive field artillery brigade in the United States Army. The brigade inactivated on May 21, 2015, at Fort Sill, Oklahoma.

== History ==
Following its transformation to a modular field artillery brigade in 2007, the 214th Fires Brigade consisted of 2 MLRS battalions (2-4th Field Artillery "Deep Attack" and 1-14th "Steel Warriors" Field Artillery), a 155 mm self-propelled howitzer battalion (2-5th Field Artillery), a target acquisition battery (H/26th Field Artillery), the 168th Brigade Support Battalion, and the 529th Signal Company. Prior to the modular transformation, the 214th Field Artillery Brigade consisted of 3 MLRS battalions: 2-4th Field Artillery, 3-13th Field Artillery, and 1-14th Field Artillery. The Brigade's mission was to performs a wide variety of functions ranging from the delivery of rocket artillery fires to operating a field hospital. Soldiers from the Brigade were regularly deployed worldwide and trained for many different missions. The 214th Field Artillery Brigade maintained a high state of combat readiness for priority worldwide contingency missions and supported Fort Sill with medical, personnel, transportation, aviation, engineer, maintenance, and chemical assets.

The 214th Fires Brigade was first constituted on 3 February 1944 in the Army of the United States as the Headquarters and Headquarters Battery, 214th Field Artillery Group and was assigned to XXI Corps, 4th US Army, at Fort Polk, Louisiana. The Group was activated on 17 April 1944. After activation at Camp Van Dorn, Mississippi, the Group moved to Fort Sill, Oklahoma on 18 November 1944 for training. The unit was moved to Europe, to Camp Twenty Grand, France on 21 April 1945. European assignments included Simmern, Neidormendig, Bassenheim, and Trier, Germany. After being assigned twice in France, at Camp Atlanta and Camp Lucky Strike, the unit returned to Continental United States (CONUS) at Camp Kilmer, New Jersey. On 13 November 1945, after moving to Camp Shelby, Mississippi, the 214th Artillery Group was inactivated.

The 214th Artillery Group was re-designated on 15 September 1958 as Headquarters and Headquarters Battery, 214th Artillery Group, and allotted to the Regular Army. It remained inactive until 15 October 1958, when it was reactivated and assigned to the United States Army Artillery and Missile Center at Fort Sill, Oklahoma.

On 15 March 1972, the Group was re-designated as the 214th Field Artillery Group. On 5 July 1979, the 3 missile battalions of the 9th Field Artillery Missile Group were reassigned to the 214th Field Artillery Group. On 16 September 1979, the 214th Field Artillery Group was re-designated as the 214th Field Artillery Brigade.

During 2000, the "Naturally We Lead" Brigade, the only pure MLRS brigade in the US Army, deployed elements of its 3 battalions throughout CONUS and OCONUS. The Brigade Headquarters deployed twice to Fort Hood, first for Exercise Road Runner and then the 1st Cavalry Warfighter exercise. During the exercise, the 214th FA Brigade reinforced the 4th Infantry Division Artillery (DIVARTY) and delivered devastating fires on the OPFOR, enhancing the Division's success.

In January 2003, the 214th Field Artillery Brigade deployed its Headquarters and Headquarters Battery, 2-4th Field Artillery, and 1-14th Field Artillery in support of Operation Iraqi Freedom. In June 2006, the 6-52nd Air Defense Artillery joined the 214th Field Artillery Brigade. On 18 September 2006, the Brigade was re-designated as the 214th Fires Brigade, a modular field artillery brigade as part of the transformation of the US Army to the modular force structure. In October 2006, the 2-5th Field Artillery and the 168th Brigade Support Battalion became a part of the 214th Fires Brigade. 3-13th Field Artillery was subsequently transferred to the 75th Fires Brigade, also at Fort Sill, Oklahoma. Though based at Fort Sill and assigned to III Corps, the 214th Fires Brigade had an informal relationship with the 4th Infantry Division at Fort Carson, Colorado.

In April 2007, Headquarters and Headquarters Battery, 214th Fires Brigade deployed for 15 months in support of Operation Iraqi Freedom. Elements of 2-4th Field Artillery Regiment and 2-5th Field Artillery also deployed to Iraq. As of July 2010, the 214th Fires Brigade expected to continue deploying units to provide rocket fires in support of Operation Iraqi Freedom until December 2012, and counter-fire radar missions there until July 2011.

== Lineage and honors ==
=== Lineage ===
- Constituted 3 February 1944 in the Army of the United States as Headquarters and Headquarters Battery, 214th Field Artillery Group
- Activated 17 April 1944 at Camp Van Dorn, Mississippi
- Inactivated 13 November 1945 at Camp Shelby, Mississippi
- Redesignated 15 September 1958 as Headquarters and Headquarters Battery, 214th Artillery Group, and allotted to the Regular Army
- Activated 15 October 1958 at Fort Sill, Oklahoma
- Redesignated 15 March 1972 as Headquarters and Headquarters Battery, 214th Field Artillery Group
- Redesignated 16 September 1979 as Headquarters and Headquarters Battery, 214th Field Artillery Brigade
- Reorganized and redesignated 18 September 2006 as Headquarters and Headquarters Battery, 214th Fires Brigade
- Inactivated 21 May 2015 at Fort Sill, Oklahoma

=== Campaign participation credit ===
- World War II: European-African-Middle Eastern Theater, Streamer without Inscription
- War on Terrorism: Participated in the invasion of Falluja, Iraq in May 2003

=== Decorations ===
- Meritorious Unit Commendation (Army), Streamer embroidered IRAQ 2003
