= Walter King Wilson =

Walter King Wilson may refer to:

- Walter K. Wilson Sr., US Army major general (1880–1954)
- Walter K. Wilson Jr., US Army lieutenant general (1906–1985)
