= List of commanders of 4th Infantry Division (United States) =

Shoulder sleeve insignia of the US 4th Infantry Division.

This is a list of commanders of the 4th Infantry Division of the United States Army.

== Past commanders ==
1. MG George H. Cameron 3 December 1917 – 16 August 1918
2. BG Benjamin A. Poore 16 August 1918 – 27 August 1918
3. MG John L. Hines 27 August 1918 – 11 October 1918
4. MG George H. Cameron 11 October 1918 – 22 October 1918
5. BG Benjamin A. Poore 22 October 1918 – 31 October 1918
6. MG Mark L. Hersey 31 October 1918 – 1 August 1919
7. BG Walter E. Prosser 16 June 1940 – 9 December 1940
8. MG Lloyd R. Fredendall 9 October 1940 – 18 August 1941
9. MG Oscar W. Griswold 18 August 1941 – 7 October 1941
10. MG Fred C. Wallace 7 October 1941 – 30 June 1942
11. MG Terry de la Mesa Allen December 1941 – December 1941
12. MG Raymond O. Barton 3 July 1942 – 26 December 1944
13. BG Harold W. Blakeley 18 September 1944 – 20 September 1944
14. MG Harold R. Bull 20 September 1944 – 29 September 1944
15. BG James A. Van Fleet 29 September 1944 – 4 October 1944
16. MG Harold W. Blakeley 27 December 1944 – October 1945
17. MG George Price Hays November 1945 – March 1946
18. MG Jens A. Doe 15 July 1947 – 28 February 1949
19. MG Robert T. Frederick 28 February 1949 – 10 October 1950
20. MG Harlan N. Hartness 10 October 1950 – 5 April 1953
21. MG Joseph H. Harper 6 April 1953 – 13 May 1954
22. MG Clyde D. Eddleman 13 May 1954 – 24 May 1955
23. MG Rinaldo Van Brunt 24 May 1955 – 15 May 1956
24. MG Paul L. Freeman 15 September 1956 – 20 January 1957
25. MG William W. Quinn 20 January 1957 – May 1958
26. BG John H. McGee June 1958 – 4 August 1958
27. MG Louis W. Truman 5 August 1958 – June 1960
28. MG William F. Train July 1960 – April 1962
29. MG Frederick R. Zierath April 1962 – August 1963
30. MG Claire E. Hutchin Jr. September 1963 – June 1965
31. MG Arthur S. Collins Jr. June 1965 – January 1967
32. MG William R. Peers January 1967 – January 1968
33. MG Charles P. Stone January 1968 – November 1968
34. BG Donn R. Pepke November 1968 – November 1969
35. MG Glenn D. Walker November 1969 – June 1970
36. MG William A. Burke June 1970 – 9 December 1970
37. MG John C. Bennett 10 December 1970 – 24 August 1972
38. MG James F. Hamlet 25 August 1972 – 14 October 1974
39. MG John W. Vessey Jr. 15 October 1974 – 1 August 1975
40. MG William W. Palmer 2 August 1975 – 15 October 1976
41. MG John F. Forrest 16 October 1976 – 18 September 1978
42. MG Louis C. Menetrey 19 September 1978 – 11 September 1980
43. MG John W. Hudachek 12 September 1980 – 30 July 1982
44. MG Theodore G. Jenes Jr. 6 June 1988 – 24 May 1990
45. MG G. T. Bartlett 14 April 1984 – 6 June 1986
46. MG James R. Hall 6 June 1986 – 22 June 1988
47. MG Dennis J. Reimer 22 June 1988 – 25 May 1990
48. MG Neal T. Jaco 25 May 1990 – 4 October 1991
49. MG Guy A. J. LaBoa 4 October 1991 – 22 October 1993
50. MG Thomas A. Schwartz 22 October 1993 – 29 November 1995
51. MG Robert S. Coffey May 1994 – June 1996
52. MG Paul J. Kern June 1996 – June 1997
53. MG William S. Wallace June 1997 – 29 June 1999
54. MG Benjamin S. Griffin 29 June 1999 – 24 October 2001
55. MG Raymond T. Odierno 24 October 2001 – 18 June 2004
56. MG James D. Thurman 18 June 2004 – 19 January 2007
57. MG Jeffery Hammond 19 January 2007 – 16 July 2009
58. MG David G. Perkins 16 July 2009 – 16 November 2011
59. MG Joseph Anderson 16 November 2011 – 14 March 2013
60. MG Paul LaCamera 14 March 2013 – 14 May 2015
61. MG Ryan F. Gonsalves 14 May 2015 – 24 August 2017
62. MG Randy A. George 24 August 2017 – 4 October 2019
63. MG Matthew W. McFarlane 4 October 2019 – 19 August 2021
64. MG David M. Hodne 19 August 2021 – 13 June 2023
65. MG David S. Doyle 13 June 2023 – 18 June 2025
66. MG Patrick J. Ellis 18 June 2025 – present
