= CGMA =

CGMA may refer to:

== Organizations ==
- Canadian Gospel Music Association, former name of GMA Canada
- Chartered Global Management Accountant, a professional management accounting designation
- Covent Garden Market Authority, owner of New Covent Garden Market, London
- Coast Guard Mutual Assistance, a charitable organization of US Coast Guard
- Church of God Mountain Assembly, a Pentecostal Christian body

== Other uses ==
- CGMA, a former cable television channel of the Filipino company GMA Network
