= James F. Hamlet =

United States Army general (1921–2001)

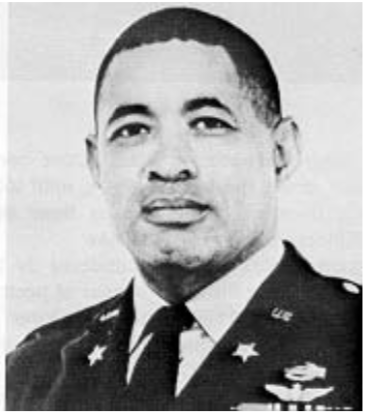
- Born: December 13, 1921; Alliance, Ohio, U.S.
- Died: January 5, 2001 (aged 79); Trenton, New Jersey, U.S.
- Military career
- Allegiance: United States of America
- Branch: United States Army
- Service years: 1942–1981
- Rank: Major General
- Commands: 11th Aviation Group; 3rd Brigade, 1st Cavalry Division; 4th Infantry Division
- Conflicts: World War II; Vietnam War
- Awards: Distinguished Service Medal; Legion of Merit (3); Distinguished Flying Cross; Bronze Star (4); Air Medal (49)

James Frank Hamlet (December 13, 1921 – January 5, 2001) was the second African American United States Army Major General and division commander. Hamlet served as commander of the 3rd Brigade, 1st Cavalry Division during the Vietnam War and later commanded the 4th Infantry Division.

== Early life and education ==
Hamlet was born in Alliance, Ohio in 1921 and attended Tuskegee University until joining the Army. Hamlet later graduated from St. Benedict's College with a degree in business administration.

== Military service ==
Hamlet left Tuskegee to enlist in the United States Army in 1942 and was commissioned as a Second lieutenant of infantry through Officer Candidate School in 1944. He served as a platoon commander in the 366th Infantry Regiment and the 370th Infantry Regiment in the segregated 92nd Infantry Division during the Italian Campaign.

After the war, Hamlet qualified first as a liaison pilot and later graduated from Army Aviation school and qualified as a helicopter pilot in 1951. He was promoted to Lt. Colonel and was assigned to Army Combat Developments Command in Fort Leavenworth in 1963 and served in that position until he deployed to Vietnam in May 1966. He began his tour in Vietnam as the operations officer for the 11th Aviation Group and later commanded the 227th Aviation Battalion. Upon his return to Fort Leavenworth he was promoted to Colonel and assigned as Chief, Air Mobility Branch, Doctrine and Systems Division, United States Army Combat Developments Command Combat Arms Group. Hamlet graduated from the United States Army War College in 1970. After completing his studies he was deployed to Vietnam for a second tour, serving first as the commander of the 11th Aviation Group. He was promoted to brigadier general in June 1971 and reassigned to serve as the assistant division commander of the 101st Airborne Division. Hamlet was reassigned again in December 1971 to command the 3rd Brigade, 1st Cavalry Division until his return to the United States in August 1972.

After his second tour ended, Hamlet was named the assistant chief of staff for force development at the Pentagon. He was nominated for promotion to major general in August 1972 and confirmed by the Senate on June 1, 1973, making him the second African American to achieve two-star rank after Frederic E. Davison. Hamlet assumed command of the Fourth Infantry Division and Fort Carson in 1972, becoming the first African American to command a division stationed in the United States. After two years at Fort Carson, Hamlet was named Deputy Inspector General of the United States Army and held that position until retiring in 1981.

Hamlet died on January 5, 2001, in Trenton, New Jersey.

Military offices
Preceded by John C. Bennett (general)	Commanding General of the 4th Infantry Division; August 25, 1972 – October 14, 1974	Succeeded by John W. Vessey Jr.
