= Dennis Reimer =

American general (born 1939)

Dennis J. Reimer
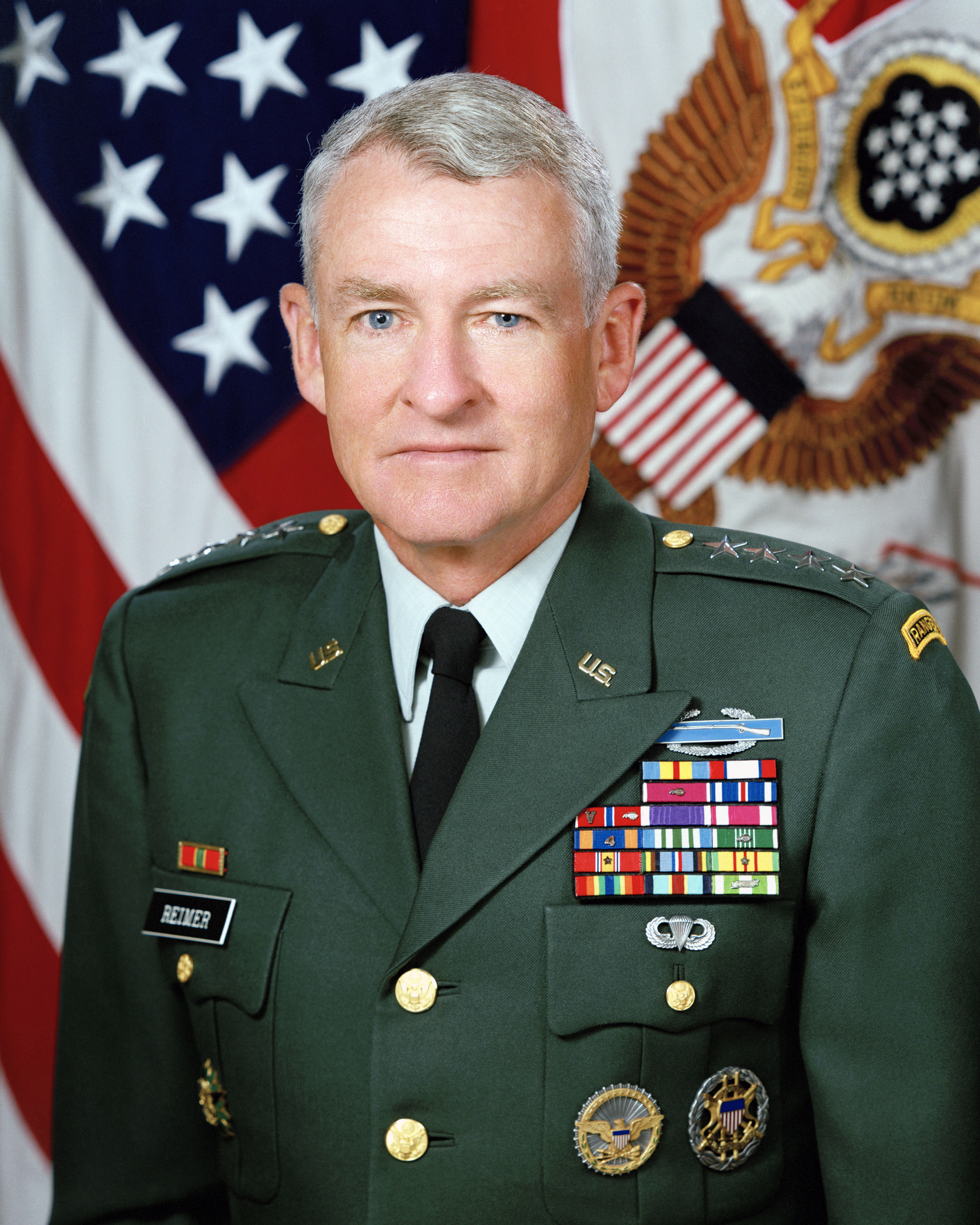
- Official portrait, 1995
- Born: 12 July 1939 (age 87); Enid, Oklahoma, U.S.
- Education: United States Military Academy (BS); Shippensburg State College (MPA)
- Spouse: Mary Jo Powers (m. 1962)
- Military career
- Allegiance: United States
- Branch: United States Army
- Service years: 1962–1999
- Rank: General
- Commands: Chief of Staff of the United States Army; United States Army Forces Command; 4th Infantry Division (Mechanized); III Corps Artillery; Division Artillery, 8th Infantry Division (Mechanized); 1st Battalion, 27th Field Artillery Regiment
- Conflicts: Vietnam War
- Awards: Defense Distinguished Service Medal; Army Distinguished Service Medal; Legion of Merit (2); Distinguished Flying Cross; Bronze Star Medal (6); Purple Heart; Order of Military Merit

Dennis Joe Reimer (born 12 July 1939) is an American retired general who last served as the 33rd chief of staff of the United States Army from 1995 to 1999. He graduated from the United States Military Academy in 1962 and became a Field Artillery Branch officer. Reimer also graduated from the Ranger and Airborne schools. He had two combat deployments during the Vietnam War. While serving as an advisor with Military Assistance Command, Vietnam, from 1964 to 1965, he was awarded two Bronze Star Medals, including one with the "V" device for valor in combat, and a Purple Heart. Reimer was deployed to Vietnam again from 1968 to 1970, where he was awarded the Distinguished Flying Cross and four Bronze Stars.

Reimer served in numerous command and staff roles throughout his career. His notable posts included as the commander of 1st Battalion, 27th Field Artillery Regiment, from 1976 to 1978; commanding general of III Corps Artillery from 1984 to 1986; and assistant chief of staff for operations, Republic of Korea/United States Combined Forces Command, from 1986 to 1988. Reimer also served as the commanding general of the 4th Infantry Division from 1988 to 1990. He helped plan operations during the Gulf War while serving as deputy chief of staff for operations and plans of the United States Army from 1990 to 1991. He also served as the 23rd vice chief of staff of the United States Army from 1991 to 1993, and as the commanding general of Army Forces Command from 1993 to 1995. During the 1990s, Reimer had a major role in the post-Cold War reform of the Army into a force focused on power projection, while undergoing budget and personnel cuts.

As the chief of staff of the Army from 1995, he presided over the deployments of troops to Europe for peacekeeping during the Bosnian War and the Kosovo War, despite being reluctant for Army ground forces to become involved. After his retirement from military service in 1999, Reimer became the director of the National Memorial Institute for the Prevention of Terrorism in Oklahoma City, Oklahoma, from 2000 to 2005. He was also the government services president of DFI International from 2005 to 2009, and president of Army Emergency Relief from 2009 to 2019. He was on the board of several companies and organizations, which includes currently serving as the chairman of the American Armed Forces Mutual Aid Association.

== Early life, family, and education ==
Dennis Joe Reimer was born in Enid, Oklahoma on 12 July 1939, and grew up in Medford, Oklahoma. He began studying at the United States Military Academy at West Point, New York, in 1958, and was commissioned into the United States Army as a second lieutenant of Field Artillery upon graduation in 1962. He also obtained a Master of Public Administration degree from Shippensburg State College in 1967. Reimer married Mary Jo (Powers), a teacher from Fargo, North Dakota, in 1962. They have two children.

Reimer's military education included the Field Artillery Officer Basic and Advanced Courses at the Army Artillery and Missile School and the Army Air Defense Artillery School, in 1962 and 1966, respectively; Ranger School and Airborne School in 1962; the Army Command and General Staff College in 1971; and the Army War College in 1979.

== Army career ==
After being commissioned, Reimer attended the Field Artillery Officer Orientation Course, Ranger School, and Airborne School. He served as assistant executive officer and executive officer, 6th Battalion, 20th Artillery, 5th Infantry Division (Mechanized) from 1963 to 1964. He was promoted to temporary first lieutenant in 1963, followed by an assignment as assistant battalion adviser, Advisory Team 60, Military Assistance Command, Vietnam from 1964 to 1965. While serving as an advisor to the Army of the Republic of Vietnam, Reimer was awarded two Bronze Star Medals, including one with valor, and a Purple Heart.

Reimer was promoted to permanent first lieutenant and temporary captain in 1965. He then returned to the United States to attend the Artillery Officer Advanced Course from 1965 to 1966. Reimer next commanded a basic training company, which was Company C, 11th Battalion, 3rd Brigade, United States Army Training Center, at Fort Benning, Georgia, from 1966 to 1967. His next assignment was as the aide-de-camp to the commandant, Armed Forces Staff College, Norfolk, Virginia, 1967 to 1968.

Reimer was promoted to temporary major in 1968, and to permanent captain in 1969. After his promotion to major, he served as executive officer and S–3 officer, 2nd Battalion, 4th Artillery, 9th Infantry Division, United States Army Vietnam from 1968 to 1970. During that deployment, Reimer was awarded the Distinguished Flying Cross and four Bronze Stars. In 1970 he briefly served as an instructor at the Army Field Artillery School at Fort Sill before attending the Army Command and General Staff College until 1971. That was followed by an assignment as personnel management officer, Assignment Section, Field Artillery Branch, Office of Personnel Operations in Washington, D.C., from 1971 to 1972.

Reimer's next duty was as assistant executive officer and aide to the Chief of Staff of the Army, General Creighton W. Abrams Jr., from 1972 to 1974. He was awarded the Legion of Merit. In 1975, he was promoted to temporary lieutenant colonel and then served as executive officer and S–3 (Operations and Training) officer, Division Artillery, 4th Infantry Division (Mechanized), Fort Carson. In 1976, he was promoted to permanent major and then became the commander of the 1st Battalion, 27th Field Artillery Regiment, also in the 4th Infantry Division, from 1976 to 1978. That was followed by an assignment as commandant, Training Command, 4th Infantry Division.

In 1979, Reimer graduated from the Army War College, and also received his Master of Arts degree from Shippensburg State College. He was promoted to temporary colonel in the same year. After completing his studies, he served as deputy commander and later special assistant to the commander, V Corps Artillery, United States Army Europe, in 1979. In 1980 Reimer was assigned to command Division Artillery, 8th Infantry Division (Mechanized), in West Germany, from 1980 to 1982 and was promoted to permanent colonel in 1982. He moved on to become the division's chief of staff before returning to the United States to serve as deputy assistant commandant, Field Artillery Center and School, until 1984.

=== General officer ===
Reimer promoted to full general, June 1991, by Gen. Gordon Sullivan

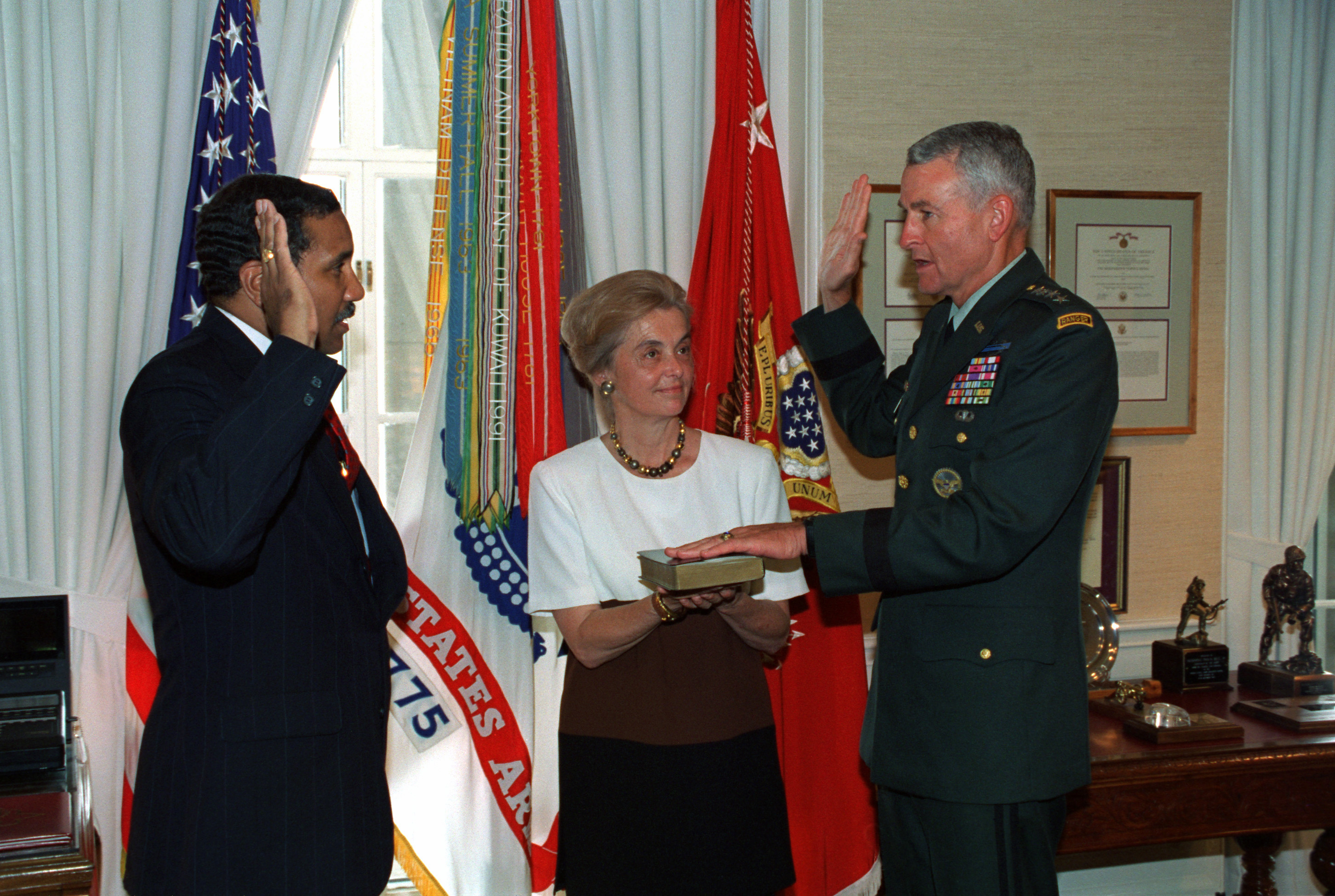
Reimer sworn in as Army chief of staff, June 1995, by Army Secretary Togo D. West Jr.

He was promoted to permanent brigadier general in 1984 and took up assignment as commanding general, III Corps Artillery, Fort Sill, from 1984 to 1986. In 1986, Reimer was assigned as chief of staff, United States Army Element, Combined Field Army in the Republic of Korea, and then as assistant chief of staff for operations, Republic of Korea/United States Combined Forces Command. He served in the latter role from 1986 to 1988. He received a promotion to major general in 1987, and commanded the 4th Infantry Division (Mechanized) at Fort Carson from 1988 to 1990.

Reimer received his third star, being promoted to permanent lieutenant general, in 1990, and subsequently served as deputy chief of staff for operations and plans of the Army. The assignment took place during the Gulf War (Operation Desert Shield/Desert Storm), and he was involved in planning the operation. Reimer received his fourth star as a full general in June 1991, after being nominated by President George H. W. Bush to serve as the 23rd vice chief of staff of the United States Army. Reimer served in that role until 1993, working with the chief of staff, General Gordon Sullivan. He presided over the Army's internal affairs, including its reduction in structure and facilities, having a key role in the post-Cold War transformation of the Army to focus on power projection.

Reimer then served as commanding general, United States Army Forces Command, Fort McPherson, Atlanta, Georgia, from 1993, where he was responsible for 60% of the Active Army, Army Reserve, and Army National Guard forces. In April 1995, Reimer was nominated to serve as the 33rd chief of staff of the United States Army by President Bill Clinton, succeeding Gordon Sullivan, at a time when the Army struggled to maintain peacekeeping operations in Somalia and in Haiti while experiencing sharp budget and personnel reductions. After being confirmed, he took office on 20 June 1995.

As the chief of staff, Reimer was very reluctant for Army troops to be deployed in interventions, due to the potential for casualties. In November 1995, he said that casualties would be inevitable if Army troops were sent into Bosnia and Herzegovina as peacekeepers after the Bosnian War. The 1st Armored Division was prepared as the main force to be deployed, and its mission was limited by the Army. In May 1996, he published an article in the journal Military Review commenting on a study that concluded that the Army officers and non-commissioned officers were too focused on their own careers compared to the welfare of soldiers. With the Army reduced from a size of 800,000 soldiers during the Gulf War to 500,000 by 1996, Reimer was concerned about indications of leadership lapses as competition for promotion in the shrinking officer corps became intense.

During meetings leading up to the start of the NATO intervention in the Kosovo War in March 1999, he expressed concern that an air campaign alone may not be enough to achieve their objectives. He later said in May 1999 that the air campaign had been "highly effective" by that point. Reimer initially rejected General Wesley Clark's request for the deployment of Army Apache helicopters, as he feared it would lead to ground forces being sent. The request was eventually authorized by Clinton. Clark wrote in his memoir that in late 1998, when he suggested to Reimer that the Army be prepared for a war in Yugoslavia, Reimer told him "but we don't want to fight there." He also wrote that in 1999, Reimer worked to prevent him from using Task Force Hawk, the Army's force of helicopters, tanks, and artillery pieces assembled in Albania, from firing on Serbian forces in Kosovo.

During Reimer's tenure, there was a perception among some officers that the senior leadership risked making the Army less relevant, with its limited roles in Bosnia and Kosovo. This view was reflected by Reimer's successor, General Eric Shinseki, who made a plan to quickly deploy Army troops to any combat zone. Reimer stepped down on 22 June 1999, being succeeded by Shinseki, and subsequently retired from the Army on 1 August 1999. During his time as chief of staff, the Army deployed troops to Bosnia, Kosovo, and Albania for peacekeeping operations, and maintained forces in the Middle East and Asia to help contain Saddam Hussein's Iraq and North Korea.

== Later life ==
Reimer in May 2023, at the 50th Vietnam War Anniversary Commemoration

After retiring from military service, Reimer became the director of the National Memorial Institute for the Prevention of Terrorism in Oklahoma City, Oklahoma, from April 2000 to May 2005. Reimer was on the board of several organizations, including the Mutual of America, the Association of the United States Army, and the Global Food Exchange. This also included the Board of Directors for the Arlington, Virginia-based consulting firm Detica, formerly DeticaDFI and DFI International. He also served as the Chairman of the Board for VirtualAgility, Inc. (VA). He was the president of DFI Government Services from September 2005 until 2008 or 2009. He was the president of Army Emergency Relief from 16 November 2009 until his retirement on 31 December 2019. He remains the chairman of the American Armed Forces Mutual Aid Association and a member of the Thayer Leadership Development Group at the United States Military Academy.

In 1997, Reimer was inducted into the Oklahoma Hall of Fame, and in 1999 he was among the first six inductees of the Oklahoma Military Hall of Fame. In 2011, Reimer received the "Distinguished Graduate Award" from the West Point Association of Graduates. Since his retirement in 1999, he has participated in the Annual Army Ten-Miler run across Washington, D.C., which is sponsored by Armed Forces Mutual.

== Awards and decorations ==
Reimer is a recipient of the Defense Distinguished Service Medal, Army Distinguished Service Medal, two Legions of Merit, Distinguished Flying Cross, six awards of the Bronze Star Medal (one with "V" Device for valor), Purple Heart, Combat Infantryman Badge, Parachutist Badge, Aircraft Crewman Badge, and Ranger tab.

Order of Military Merit (Grand Officer; Brazil)

== Bibliography ==
- Reimer, Dennis J. (29 September 1998). "Statement by General Dennis J. Reimer, Chief of Staff, United States Army, before the Committee on Armed Services". Second Session, 105th Congress, on Readiness. United States Senate. Archived from the original on 15 June 2004.
- Reimer, Dennis J. (29 April 2003). "Statement by Gen. Dennis J. Reimer (Ret.), Director, National Memorial Institute for the Prevention of Terrorism". Subcommittee on National Security, Emergency Threats and International Relations. National Memorial Institute for the Prevention of Terrorism. Archived from the original on 17 July 2011.
- Reimer, Dennis J. (19 November 2003). Statement of Dennis J. Reimer to the National Commission on Terrorist Attacks Upon The United States. GlobalSecurity. Archived from the original on 24 June 2004.

Military offices
Preceded by James R. Hall	Commanding General of the 4th Infantry Division; 1988–1990	Succeeded by Neal T. Jaco
Preceded by Gordon R. Sullivan	Deputy Chief of Staff for Operations and Plans of the United States Army; 1990–1991	Succeeded by ??
Preceded by Gordon R. Sullivan	Vice Chief of Staff of the United States Army; 1991–1993	Succeeded by J. H. Binford Peay III
Preceded by Edwin H. Burba Jr.	Commanding General of the United States Army Forces Command; 1993–1995	Succeeded by John H. Tilelli Jr.
Preceded by Gordon R. Sullivan	Chief of Staff of the United States Army; 1995–1999	Succeeded by Eric Shinseki
