= Army Emergency Relief =

Non-profit organization in the USA

Seal of the Army Emergency Relief

Army Emergency Relief (AER) is a non-profit, charitable organization independent of, but closely associated with the United States Army. AER was established on Feb. 5, 1943, in Washington, DC, by Secretary of War Henry Stinson and Army Chief of Staff Gen. George Marshall, with $1.5 million in seed money from the American Red Cross and $12 million from Irving Berlin's musical, "This is the Army." It was incorporated as a non-profit organization to meet the emergency financial needs of a rapidly expanding Army.

The first slogan of AER was "The Army Cares For Its Own." In October 1943, Cases handled by the various officers of Army Emergency Relief cover emergency operations, accidents, births, and all other problems requiring immediate attention and needing assistance. Here the wife of an Army man who expects a baby and who needs financial, medical or post-natal assistance, receives the courteous and understanding assistance from that military agency which believes in caring of its own.

AER merged with the Army Relief Society in July 1976.

It is one of the four official military service relief organizations alongside the Navy-Marine Corps Relief Society, the Air Force Aid Society, and Coast Guard Mutual Assistance.

The organization is headquartered in Arlington, VA.

AER's Board of Managers is made up of senior active duty and retired officers and noncommissioned officers, industry experts and spouses of Army leaders. Michael A. Grinston, the 16th Sergeant Major of the Army, was named CEO of AER in late 2023. He took over the non-profit in January 2024. He is the first-ever noncommissioned officer to head the relief foundation. Grinston sees his role at AER as a continuation of his commitment to Soldiers and their Families. AER's mission strongly aligns with Grinston's purpose of bringing stability to Soldiers in need. In his former leadership roles, he saw first-hand the issues that can stem from strained financial situations – suicide, domestic violence and food insecurity to name a few. Grinston wants to ensure that Soldiers do not have the burden of worrying about financial issues while they are protecting Americans around the world.

== Mission ==
The mission of the AER is to help U.S. Army soldiers, retired soldiers and their dependents by providing financial assistance in the form of grants (cash gifts not to be repaid) and interest-free loans, and by giving college scholarships to spouses and children of soldiers and retired soldiers.

== Assets, aid, and expenses ==
Grants are made to individuals based on financial need. Financial assistance grants are provided based on evidence of current or impending debt liability. Educational grants (scholarships) are paid to the school on behalf of the student and the school confirms the students' enrollment. Guidelines for issuing financial assistance in the form of a grant vice no-interest loan is provided in Army Regulation 930-4 and performance is monitored by statistical monitoring and random checks of assistance cases. Grant assistance is not issued without proper documentation.

Commanders and sergeants at the company level can approve zero-interest loans up to $2,000. AER officers at each installation approve grants and loans up to $4,000; commanders and senior non-commissioned officers at the garrison level approve grants and loans up to $5,000; and anything over $5,000 is handled by the AER Headquarters in Arlington, Virginia.

Effective September 9, 2015, junior soldiers—privates through corporals/specialists—complete Initial Entry Training and have a minimum of 12 months service or have completed Advanced Individual Training (whichever comes first) will no longer be required to request an AER loan or grant by going through their chain of command. In 2013, sergeants first class were given direct access to AER without going through their chain of command. On Jan. 1, 2014, AER extended direct access to sergeants and above.

As of November 2023, AER disburses approximately 75% of its assistance through 200 volunteer AER officers (AEROs) at 70 Army installations worldwide. The 70 officers are staffed by AEROs who are United States Department of the Army Government Services employees. Their office space and equipment are integrated into the Army Community Services sections of the installation. They implement the AER Program by disbursing financial assistance however, AER HQ does not own/lease their office space nor pay their salaries. AER maintains internal control over the AEROs through an Army regulation (AR 930-4) and written agreements with the Army Installation Management Command (IMCOM) as well as through annual audits, a 5-tiered training program, assistance visits and daily interactions between AER HQ and the individual AEROs.

AER dispersed almost $80,000 in grants following July 2024's Hurricane Beryl. In 2023, AER helped more than 2,000 Army Families with more than $1.3 million in disaster relief. AER provided $36,000 in grants to soldiers based on Guam in the wake of Super Typhoon Marwar. In 2023, the organization provided roughly $57.6 million in assistance and $5.3 million in scholarships, according to AER.

In February 2009, the Associated Press reported that the AER had, between 2003 and 2007, distributed a total of $64 million in aid, an average of $13 million per year, while adding $117 million to its reserves, and reaching total assets of $345 million. AER ended 2007 with a $296 million in its investment portfolio of stocks and bonds. During that five-year period of 2003–2007, AER's emergency assistance consisted of 91 percent repayable loans and 9 percent direct grants. In 2008, AER gave out $5.5 million in emergency grants, $65 million in loans, and $12 million in scholarships, to a total of 72,000 people. For 2009, AER plans to reduce its total scholarships to $8 million.

As of early 2009, AER was paying for a staff of 21 people, all at its headquarters at the Army Human Resources Command in Alexandria, Virginia, with the Army paying 300 or so other civilians, located at ninety Army sites worldwide, who worked full-time for the AER. The Army also provides AER its office space at no charge.

In 2024, the AER reported a total revenue of $32,975,008 with 31.8% from contributions, 17.7% in investment income and 50.5% from sales of assets.

The AER provided $13.6 million in grants and $49.7 million in zero-interest loans in 2024, as well as $357,000 as part of the Pentagon Victims Scholarship Fund.

In October 2024, the AER added a new support policy for domestic-abuse which provides up to $1,500 in immediate aid for transportation, temporary lodging, personal items, and food.

As of January 2025, the AER offers emergency-travel airfare assistance with grants up to $2000 for domestic travel and $4000 for international travel in the case of family emergency or death.

The AER offers an online portal since 2025, which allows soldiers, families and retirees that are eligible for the programs to apply for assistance and track their requests without having to visit and AER office.

== Armed Forces Relief Trust ==
In 2003, a new nonprofit organization, the Armed Forces Relief Trust, was formed with assistance from the National Association of Broadcasters. The mission of the trust is to assist the four military aid societies—AER, the Air Force Aid Society, the Navy-Marine Corps Relief Society, and the Coast Guard Mutual Assistance, by providing a single place to receive donations for the entire U.S. Armed Services.

== History of AER Leadership ==
Directors

- 2023–present: Sgt. Maj. of the Army Michael A. Grinston, U.S. Army, Retired
- 2017–2023: Lt. Gen. Raymond V. Mason, U.S. Army, Retired
- 2005–2016: Lt. Gen. Robert F. Foley, U.S. Army, Retired
- 1986–2005: Lt. Gen. Nathaniel R. Thompson Jr., U.S. Army, Retired
- 1976–1986: Maj. Gen. James J. Ursano, U.S. Army, Retired
- 1966–1976: Maj. Gen. George A. Carver, U.S. Army, Retired
- 1951–1966: Maj. Gen. Edward F. Witsell, U.S. Army, Retired
- 1944–1951: Maj. Gen. Walter K. Wilson, U.S. Army, Retired
- 1942–1944: Maj. Gen. Irving J. Phillipson, U.S. Army
- 1942: Maj. Gen. William N. Haskell, U.S. Army, Retired

Presidents

- 2020–present: Gen. John F. Campbell, U.S. Army Retired
- 2009–2019: Gen. Dennis J. Reimer, U.S. Army, Retired
- 1984–2009: Gen. Edward C. Meyer, U.S. Army, Retired
- 1975–1984: Gen. James H. Polk, U.S. Army, Retired
- 1963–1975: Gen. George H. Decker, U.S. Army, Retired
- 1950–1963: Gen. Wade H. Haislip, U.S. Army, Retired
- 1948–1950: Hon. Tracy S. Voorhees, Undersecretary of War
- 1947–1948: Hon. William H. Draper Jr., Undersecretary of War
- 1945–1947: Hon. Kenneth C. Royall, Undersecretary of War
- 1942–1945: Hon. Robert P. Patterson, Undersecretary of War
