= Matthew McFarlane =

U.S. Army general

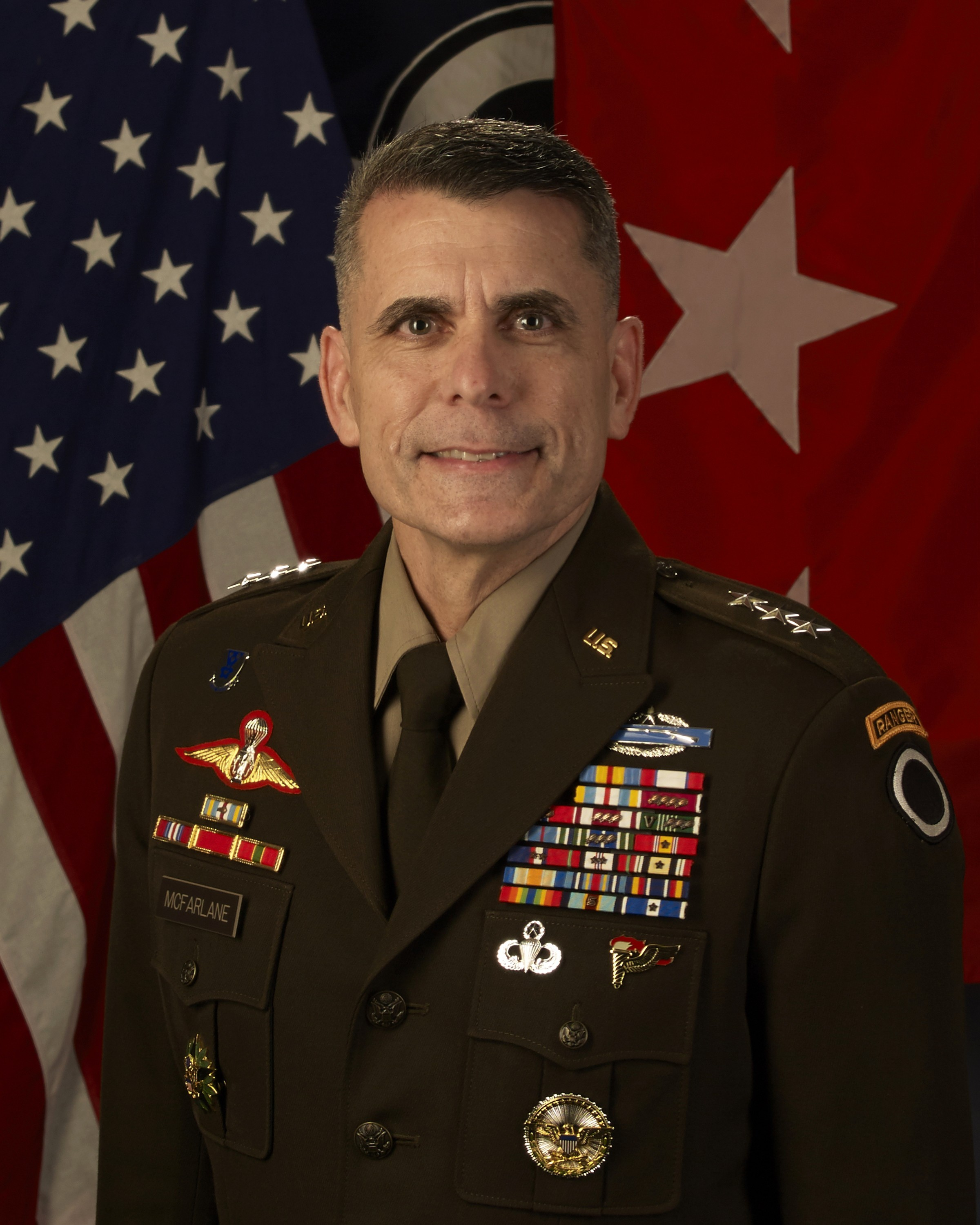
- Official portrait, 2024
- Military career
- Allegiance: United States
- Branch: United States Army
- Service years: 1992–present
- Rank: Lieutenant General
- Commands: I Corps; Combined Joint Task Force – Operation Inherent Resolve; 4th Infantry Division; 4th Brigade Combat Team (Airborne), 25th Infantry Division; 1st Battalion (Airborne), 503d Infantry Regiment
- Conflicts: War in Afghanistan; Iraq War
- Awards: Defense Distinguished Service Medal; Army Distinguished Service Medal; Legion of Merit (4); Bronze Star Medal (3)

Matthew W. McFarlane is a United States Army lieutenant general who has served as the commanding general of I Corps since 25 October 2024. He most recently served as the deputy commanding general of I Corps from 2023 to 2024. Before that assignment, he served as the commander of Combined Joint Task Force – Operation Inherent Resolve from 2022 to 2023. He also served as the deputy commanding general of United States Army Pacific from 2021 to 2022, and as the commanding general of the 4th Infantry Division from 2019 to 2021. Prior to that, he was the Senior Military Assistant to the Deputy Secretary of Defense.

In October 2024, McFarlane was promoted to lieutenant general and assumed command of I Corps.

Military offices
Preceded by Brian E. Winski	Deputy Commanding General (Operations) of the 82nd Airborne Division; 2016–2017	Succeeded by ???
Preceded by Stuart B. Munsch	Senior Military Assistant to the Deputy Secretary of Defense; 2017–2019	Succeeded by David B. Lyons
Preceded by Randy George	Commanding General of the 4th Infantry Division; 2019–2021	Succeeded by David Hodne
Preceded by Jonathan P. Braga	Deputy Commanding General (South) of United States Army Pacific; 2021–2022	Succeeded by James Jarrard
Preceded by John W. Brennan	Commander of Combined Joint Task Force – Operation Inherent Resolve; 2022–2023	Succeeded by Joel B. Vowell
Preceded by Michelle A. Schmidt	Deputy Commanding General of I Corps; 2023–2024	Succeeded by Bernard J. Harrington
Preceded by Xavier Brunson	Commanding General of I Corps; 2024–present	Incumbent
