= Armed Forces Mutual =

American not-for-profit U.S. Armed Forces support organization

- Formerly: American Armed Forces Mutual Aid Association
- Industry: Financial services Life insurance
- Genre: Not-for-profit
- Founded: 1879
- Headquarters: Fort Myer, Virginia, U.S.
- Key people: BG Michael J. Meese, PhD (USA, Ret.); President; Mark H. Matsuura; Chief Financial Officer and Treasurer; Kevin Kincaid; Chief Marketing Officer; COL Jerry Quinn (USAR, Ret.); Chief Operating Officer and Secretary; Charlene Wilde; Senior Vice President and Assistant Secretary; Jeff Havener; President, AAFMAA Mortgage Services LLC; Charles B. Betancourt; Chief Operating Officer AAFMAA Property; LTC Steve Mannell, USA, Ret. President, AAFMAA Wealth Management & Trust
- Products: Insurance, Government Benefits counseling, Wealth Management & Trust services, Mortgages
- Total assets: ▼$1.26 billion
- Number of employees: 150
- Website: aafmaa.com

Armed Forces Mutual (Formally known as American Armed Forces Mutual Aid Association) is a Virginia-based not-for-profit, tax-exempt, member-owned organization that provides life insurance and financial services, to members of the United States Armed Forces and their families. At the end of 2019, membership exceeded 85,000 Founded in 1879 following the Battle of the Little Bighorn, it is one of the oldest military-oriented financial associations in the United States.

Armed Forces Mutual operates under IRS section 501(c)(23), as a mutual aid society established prior to 1880 to support veterans through insurance benefits.

The organization has since expanded to provide wealth management, trust, and mortgage services through its wholly owned subsidiaries to past and present members of the U.S. Armed Forces.

== History ==
Armed Forces Mutual was founded on January 13, 1879, by U.S. Army officers following the 1876 Battle of Little Bighorn, which exposed the lack of financial support for soldiers’ families. Brigadier General Roger Jones led the effort to create a member- owned, nonprofit mutual aid association. Originally named the Army Mutual Aid Association, membership was initially limited to Army officers, however, the organization expanded eligibility over time.

In 1954, membership was extended to the Army National Guard and Reserve. Air Force officers were included in 1984, prompting a name change in 1987 to the Army and Air Force Mutual Aid Association (AAFMAA). In 1995, eligibility was broadened to include non-commissioned Officers and, in 2000, further opened to enlisted personnel. In September 2011, the organization began accepting service members of the Marine Corps, Navy and Coast Guard. To reflect its broader scope, the association's name was changed to American Armed Forces Mutual Aid Association on June 12, 2013. At the end of 2019, membership exceeded 85,000 By 2020, membership included all members of the United States Armed Forces who are on active duty, retired, guard, reserves, students of the service academies, contracted ROTC cadets, and honorably discharged veterans.

In 2021, membership was further extended to encompass all members of the Space Force as well as the National Oceanic and Atmospheric Administration (NOAA) and the Commissioned Corps of the U.S. Public Health Service (USPHS). As of 2024, it serves over 95,800 members, spouses, and dependents and manages approximately $1.26 billion in assets.

In April 2025, AAFMAA adopted the name Armed Forces Mutual, while retaining its legal name in formal settings.

Armed Forces Mutual is headquartered at Fort Myer, Virginia with additional offices in Reston, Virginia and Fayetteville, North Carolina.

== Services ==
Armed Forces Mutual primarily provides life insurance, including term and whole life policies tailored to military servicemembers, Veterans, and their families. It also provides financial planning, investment management, and mortgage services through its wholly owned subsidiaries. Some policies do not require a medical exam and provide coverage for life.

A core program is Survivor Assistance Services, through which staff assist families of deceased members with life insurance claims and applications for government benefits.

Armed Forces Mutual collaborated with the Veteran Saves initiative to support financial literacy and savings among Veterans. The association introduced two new life insurance products, BeyondBasic^{®}, aimed at younger active-duty servicemembers, and Simple Term, designed for current and former uniformed service members and their families.

Armed Forces Mutual offers life insurance policies without a combat exclusion.

== Membership and organization ==
Eligibility includes all active duty, reserve, and National Guard personnel from all U.S. Armed Forces branches, including the Space Force, as well as cadets, midshipmen, honorably discharged veterans in most states, and their families. Certain benefits extend to spouses and dependents.

== Governance ==
Armed Forces Mutual operates as a nonprofit mutual aid association. Members are policyholders and stakeholders. Surplus revenue is used to reduce premiums, increase benefits, or fund Member services. Donations are not accepted and are not tax-deductible due to its 501(c)(23) status, though the organization is tax-exempt. A board of directors elected from the membership oversees operations. The president, typically a retired officer, manages daily activities. Brigadier General Michael J. Meese, USA (Ret.), has served in this role since 2020.

A board of directors elected from the membership oversees operations. The president, typically a retired officer, manages daily activities. Brigadier General Michael J. Meese, USA (Ret.), has served in this role since 2020.

== Honorable board members and chairmen ==
- Dennis Joe Reimer is a retired U.S. Army four-star general who currently serves as Chair of the Armed Forces Mutual Board of Directors.
- Jack Neil Merritt was a retired U.S. Army four-star general who served on the board of directors for AAFMAA from 2000 to 2017 and was the Vice Chairman of the Board and Chairman of the Finance Committee.
- Robert W. Sennewald was a retired U.S. Army four-star general who served as chairman of the board for AAFMAA.
- Clyde D. Eddleman was a United States Army four-star general who served as chairman of the board for AAFMAA from 1962 to 1982.
- John R. Guthrie was a United States Army four-star general who served on the board of directors for AAFMAA.
- Walter T. Kerwin, Jr. was a United States Army four-star general and served as a member of the board of directors for AAFMAA from 1969, becoming its chairman in 1982 and serving until 1997.
- Michael S. Davison was a United States Army four-star general and served as the vice chairman for AAFMAA from 1982 to 1997 and chairman from 1997 to 2000.
