= Paul D. Phillips =

United States Army general (1918–2023)

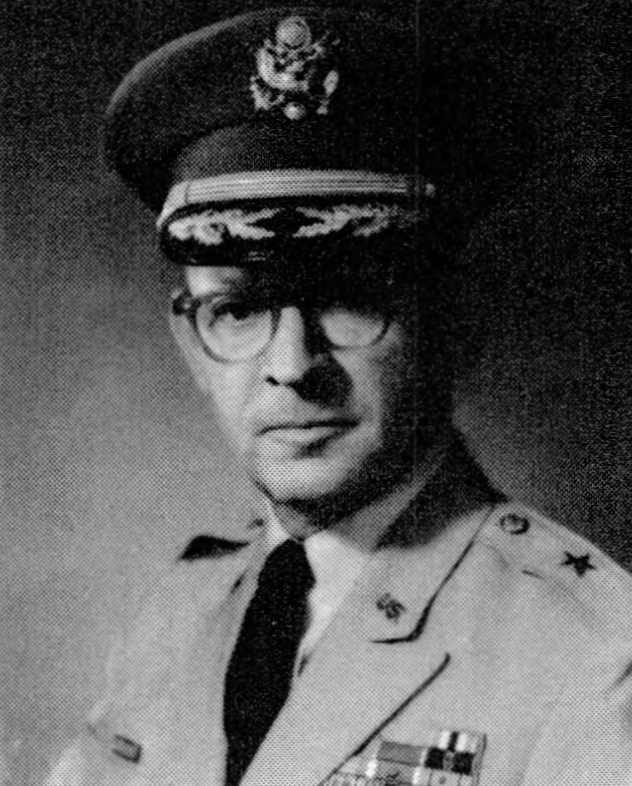
- Born: Paul David Phillips; March 9, 1918; Denver, Colorado, U.S.
- Died: August 27, 2023 (aged 105); Highlands Ranch, Colorado, U.S.
- Alma mater: United States Military Academy (BSc); Command and General Staff College; Armed Forces Staff College; National War College; George Washington University (MA)
- Military career
- Allegiance: United States
- Branch: United States Army
- Service years: 1940–1966
- Rank: Brigadier General
- Service number: O-22939
- Unit: Field Artillery
- Commands: 27th Armored Field Artillery Battalion
- Conflicts: World War II
- Awards: Army Distinguished Service Medal; Legion of Merit; Silver Star; Bronze Star Medal; Purple Heart (2); Army Commendation Medal

Paul David Phillips (March 9, 1918 – August 27, 2023) was a United States Army Brigadier General and government official.

== Early life ==
He was born in Denver, Colorado on March 9, 1918, the son of Floyd E. Phillips and Josephine Scureman. He later attended Edison Grammar School, Skinner Junior High School, and North High School. While in high school he worked for the Bureau of Biological Survey at a U.S. Customs house in downtown Denver. He then enrolled in the University of Denver on a one year scholarship and would later take the exam for West Point. He was appointed to the United States Military Academy by U.S. Senator Edward P. Costigan from Colorado on July 1, 1936.

== Further education and military service ==
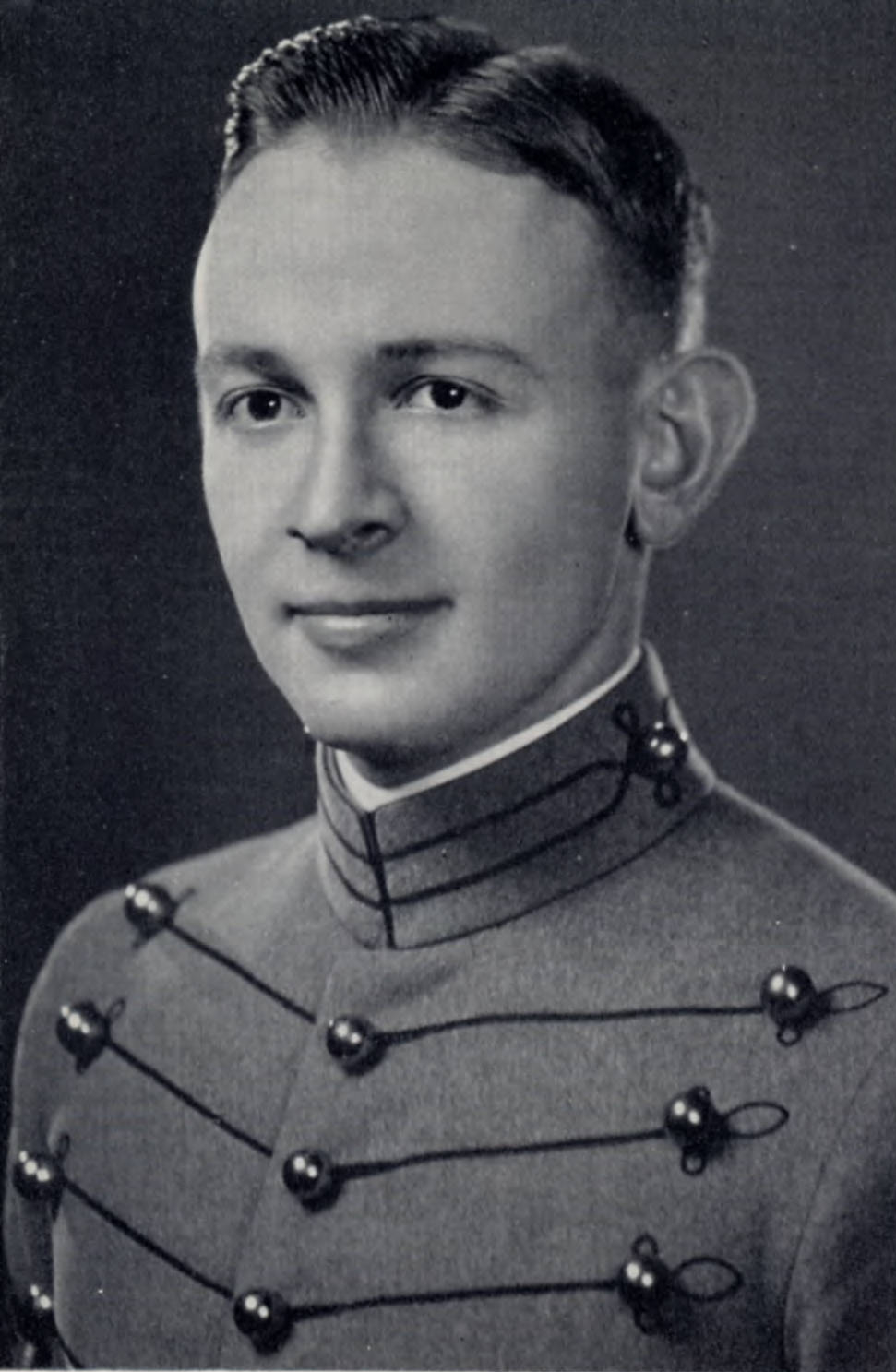
Phillips as a West Point cadet

He graduated from the academy in 1940 and was commissioned a Second Lieutenant in the Field Artillery branch of the United States Army (ASN: O-22939). After graduation he attended the United States Army Field Artillery School and later served as a battery officer for the 18th Field Artillery Regiment.

In 1941 he served as a battery officer at Fort Stotsenburg on Luzon in the Philippine Islands. From 1941 to 1942 he served as an assistant to Chief of Staff, G-2 and later G-3 for the Visayan Mindanao Force. In 1942 he served with the 24th Field Artillery Regiment and later moved up through staff and field positions while serving with the Visayan Mindanao Force.

On May 11, 1942, his unit surrendered to Japanese forces and he would spend the remainder of the war in POW camps in Mindanao, Luzon, Japan, Manchuria and Korea. As a prisoner of war he survived the sinking of two ships that were bombed by allied aircraft that were unaware that the ships were carrying prisoners. The last camp he was held in (the Hoten Camp) was liberated on August 20, 1945, by Soviet troops and a small OSS team.

He returned to the United States in 1945 and attended Officer Candidate school in Washington, D.C. He then attended the United States Army Field Artillery School for a second time joining the faculty in the gunnery department. He later attended the Command and General Staff College for three years and commanded the 27th Armored Field Artillery Battalion of the 1st Armored Division. From 1952 to 1954 he served in the civil affairs division of Headquarters, United States Army Europe. He then served as a personnel officer and plans officer (G-3) for the 2nd Armored Division and attended the Armed Forces Staff College, graduating in 1955. In the late 1950s he would serve as the action officer for the implementation of the 1958 DoD Reorganization Act, was assigned to the office of the Deputy Chief of Staff for Operations, and then as special assistant and executive to the Director of the Joint Staff. He attended and graduated from the National War College in 1960 and then served as Deputy Commander of I Corps Artillery in Korea until 1961. He then served on the staff & faculty of the Air War College and would later attend George Washington University graduating in 1963 with a master's degree in international affairs. He then served in the office of the Assistant Chief of Staff for Force Development as director of plans and programs from 1964 to 1966. He retired from the army in 1966.

=== Dates of Rank ===
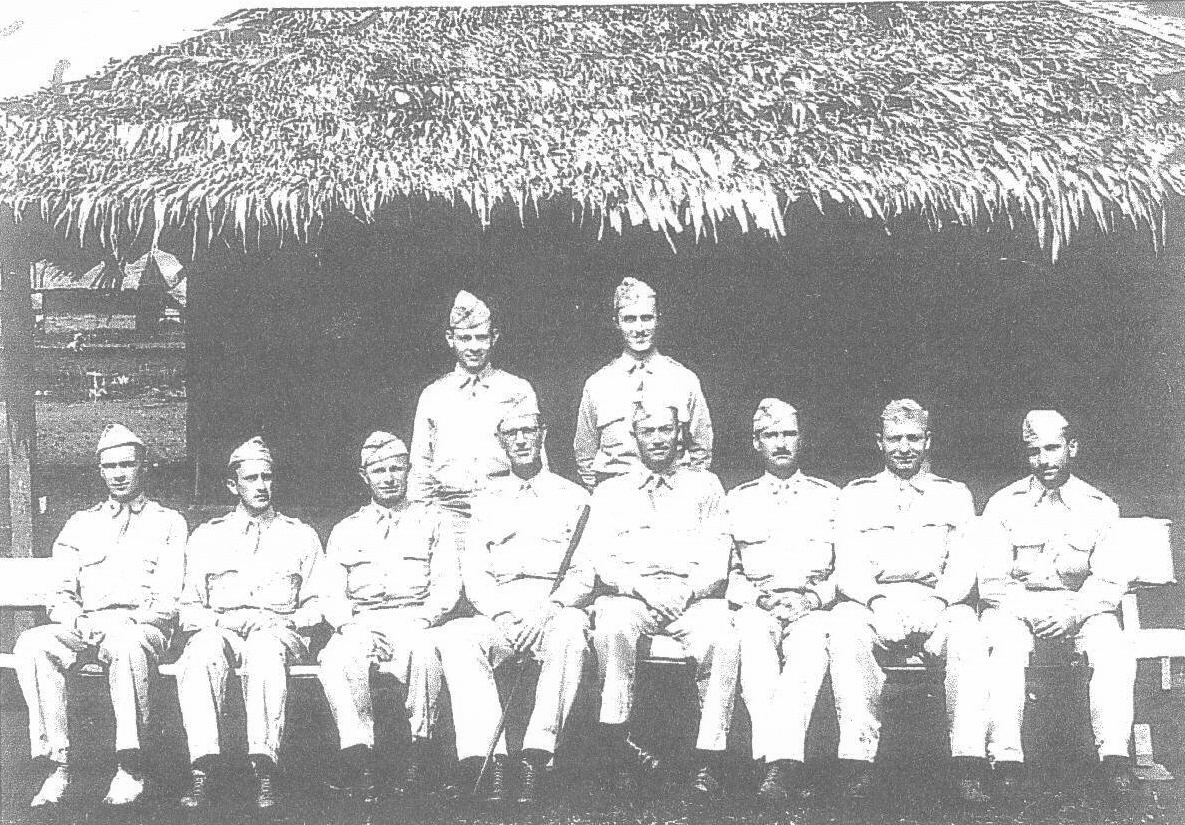
Major General William F. Sharp and his staff in 1942. Phillips is standing in the middle of the photo on the left.

- June 11, 1940: Second Lieutenant (RA)
- October 10, 1941: First Lieutenant (AUS)
- December 19, 1941: Captain (AUS)
- April 13, 1942: Major (AUS)
- June 11, 1943: First Lieutenant (RA)
- August 20, 1945: Lieutenant Colonel (AUS)
- July 15, 1948: Captain (RA)
- August 29, 1952: Major (RA)
- June 7, 1957: Colonel (AUS)
- June 11, 1960: Lieutenant Colonel (RA)
- May 30, 1964: Brigadier General (AUS)
- June 11, 1965: Colonel (RA)
- June 1966: Brigadier General (retired)

== Post military service ==
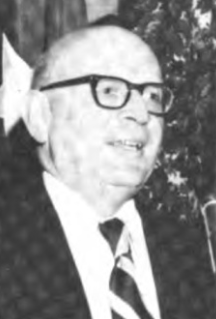
Phillips in 1975

From 1966 to 1968 and 1969 to 1971 he worked for the Research Analysis Corporation serving as a senior analyst and later assistant to the vice president of the company. From 1968 to 1969 and 1971 to 1979 he served as Deputy Assistant Secretary of the Army for Manpower and Reserve Affairs. While in this position he also served as acting Assistant Secretary of the Army for Manpower and Reserve Affairs in the years 1973, 1974, 1975 and 1977. He retired from government service in 1979. From 1979 until around the late 1980s he worked as a manpower consultant in Denver.

== Personal life and death ==
He married Rita A. Ruzicka after graduation from West Point in June 1940 and they had three children together. She died in 1991.

He died on August 27, 2023, in Highlands Ranch, Colorado at the age of 105. His remains were cremated and his ashes were buried at Saint John's Episcopal Church Columbarium in Granby, Colorado.

Until his death he was the oldest living West Point graduate.

== Awards and decorations ==
- Army Distinguished Service Medal
- Legion of Merit
- Silver Star
- Bronze Star Medal
- Purple Heart with oak leaf cluster
- Army Commendation Medal
- Army Distinguished Civilian Service Medal
- Prisoner of War Medal
