= 18th Field Artillery Regiment =

US military unit

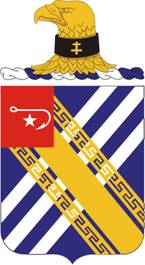
- Coat of arms
- Active: 1916
- Country: United States
- Branch: Army
- Type: Field artillery
- Motto: Per Aspera Ad Astra (Through Difficulties to the Stars)

Insignia
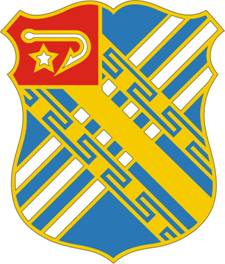
- Distinctive unit insignia

The 18th Field Artillery Regiment is a field artillery regiment of the United States Army first formed in 1916.

== History ==
The 18th Field Artillery was organized 1 June 1917 in the Regular Army.

== Distinctive unit insignia ==
- Description

A gold color metal and enamel device 1 1/16 inches (2.7 cm) in height consisting of a shield blazoned: Azure, three bendlets sinister Argent, a bend double-cottized potente counter-potente Or; on a canton Gules a mullet within a fish-hook fesswise, ring to dexter and barb to base, of the second (for the 5th Field Artillery).

- Symbolism

The shield is the shoulder patch of the 3rd Division, the bend and bendlets are from the arms of Champagne. The canton indicates the parentage of the regiment. The fishhook and Star are from the coat of arms of the 5th Field Artillery; the union battle line of Gettysburg was in the shape of a fishhook and the corps badge of Slocum's 12th Corps was a star.

- Background

The distinctive unit insignia was originally approved for the 18th Field Artillery Regiment on 2 October 1923. It was amended to correct the method of wear on 25 May 1925. It was amended to correct the blazon on 12 July 1928. It was redesignated for the 18th Field Artillery Battalion on 4 September 1943. The insignia was redesignated for the 18th Artillery Regiment on 18 November 1958. It was again redesignated for the 18th Field Artillery Regiment effective 1 September 1971.

== Coat of arms ==
- Blazon
- Shield

Azure, three bendlets sinister Argent, a bend double-cottized potente counter-potente Or; on a canton Gules a mullet within a fish-hook fesswise, ring to dexter and barb to base, of the second (for the 5th Field Artillery).

- Crest

On a wreath of the colors Argent and Azure an eagle's head erased Or gorged with a collar Sable charged with a Lorraine cross of the first.

- Symbolism
- Shield

The shield is the shoulder patch of the 3rd Division, the bend and bendlets are from the arms of Champagne. The canton indicates the parentage of the regiment. The fishhook and Star are from the coat of arms of the 5th Field Artillery; the union battle line of Gettysburg was in the shape of a fishhook and the corps badge of Slocum's 12th Corps was a star.

- Crest

The crest is from the coat of arms of St. Mihiel.

- Motto

The motto is an extract from the citation received by the 18th.

- Background

The coat of arms was originally approved for the 18th Field Artillery Regiment on 18 May 1923. It was amended to correct the blazon on 12 July 1928. It was redesignated for the 18th Field Artillery Battalion on 4 September 1943. The insignia was redesignated for the 18th Artillery Regiment on 18 November 1958. It was again redesignated for the 18th Field Artillery Regiment effective 1 September 1971.

== Current configuration ==
- 1st Battalion 18th Field Artillery Regiment (United States)
- 2nd Battalion, 18th Field Artillery Regiment 2nd Battalion, 18th Field Artillery Regiment (2-18th FAR) is a (M270A1 MLRS) Multiple Launch Rocket System unit in the 75th Field Artillery Brigade (United States), currently based at Fort Sill, Oklahoma and supports III Corps. 75th Field Artillery Brigade (United States)
- 3rd Battalion 18th Field Artillery Regiment (United States) inactive
- 4th Battalion 18th Field Artillery Regiment - Inactive since 1992. Last assigned to 41st Field Artillery Brigade, Babenhausen, Hessen, Germany.
- 5th Battalion 18th Field Artillery Regiment - Inactive since 1993. Last assigned to 75th Field Artillery Brigade, Ft. Sill, OK. was last active 8 inch unit in the United States Army.
- 6th Battalion 18th Field Artillery Regiment (United States)

== Notable personnel ==
- Paul D. Phillips, battery officer (1940-1941); former oldest living West Point graduate, retired as a Brigadier General.

== See also ==
- Field Artillery Branch (United States)
- U.S. Army Coast Artillery Corps
