= 27th Field Artillery Regiment =

US military unit

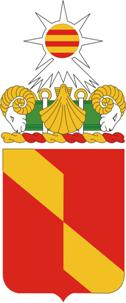
- Coat of arms
- Active: 1918
- Country: United States
- Branch: Army
- Type: Field artillery
- Motto: Conjuncti Stamus (United We Stand)

Insignia
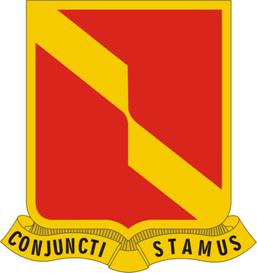
- Distinctive unit insignia

The 27th Field Artillery Regiment is a field artillery regiment of the United States Army, first Constituted in 1918 in the National Army (USA).

== History ==
The 27th Artillery was constituted on 2 August 1918, and assigned to the 9th Division at Camp McClellan, Alabama

== Lineage ==
Constituted 5 July 1918 in the National Army as Battery C, 27th Field Artillery, an element of the 9th Division

Organized 2 August 1918 at Camp McClellan, Alabama

Demobilized 8 February 1919 at Camp McClellan, Alabama

Reconstituted 24 March 1923 in the Regular Army as Battery C, 27th Field Artillery, an element of the 9th Division (27th Field Artillery relieved 1 October 1933 from assignment to the 9th Division)

Redesignated 15 July 1940 as Battery C, 27th Field Artillery Battalion, and activated at Fort Knox, Kentucky, as an element of the 1st Armored Division

Redesignated 1 January 1942 as Battery C, 27th Armored Field Artillery Battalion

Converted and redesignated 1 May 1946 as Troop C, 27th Constabulary Squadron, and relieved from assignment to the 1st Armored Division

Inactivated 20 December 1948 in Germany; concurrently, converted and redesignated as Battery C, 27th Armored Field Artillery Battalion, an element of the 1st Armored Division

Activated 7 March 1951 at Fort Hood, Texas

Inactivated 15 February 1958 at Fort Polk, Louisiana, and relieved from assignment to the 1st Armored Division; concurrently, redesignated as Headquarters and Headquarters Battery, 3d Battalion, 27th Artillery

Redesignated 17 March 1959 as Headquarters and Headquarters Battery, 3d Howitzer Battalion, 27th Artillery; concurrently, withdrawn from the Regular Army, allotted to the Army Reserve, and assigned to the 79th Infantry Division (organic elements concurrently constituted)

Battalion activated 6 April 1959 with headquarters at Pittsburgh, Pennsylvania

Inactivated 28 February 1963 at Pittsburgh, Pennsylvania, and relieved from assignment to the 79th Infantry Division

Redesignated 10 May 1967 as the 3d Battalion, 27th Artillery; concurrently, withdrawn from the Army Reserve, allotted to the Regular Army, assigned to the 198th Infantry Brigade, and activated at Fort Hood, Texas

Inactivated 12 May 1967 at Fort Hood, Texas, and relieved from assignment to the 198th Infantry Brigade

On 15 December 1970, the 1st Battalion, 27th Field Artillery, was assigned to the 4th Infantry Division at Fort Carson, Colorado, armed with M110 8" Self-Propelled Howitzers. It remained with the 4th Infantry Division until it was inactivated on 16 March 1987.

Redesignated 1 September 1971 as the 3d Battalion, 27th Field Artillery(this is an error, as the 1st Battalion 27th Artillery still existed at Fort Carson on that date and was the official custodian of the regimental lineage and honors.)

Activated 1 March 1988 at Fort Bragg, North Carolina

=== Campaign participation credit ===
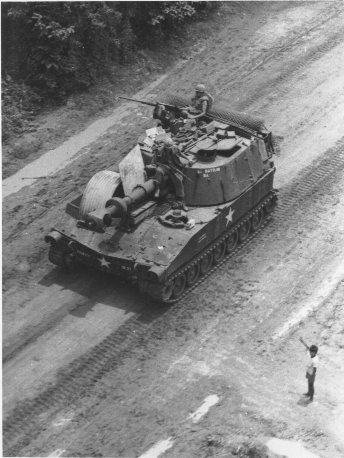
A final farewell to American troops is waved by this Cambodian youngster as a 155mm M109 howitzer self propelled howitzer of Bravo Battery, 1st Bn, 27th Arty, nears the border of South Vietnam.

World War II

- Algeria-French Morocco (with arrowhead)
- Tunisia
- Naples-Foggia
- Anzio
- Rome-Arno
- North Apennines
- Po Valley

Southwest Asia

- Defense of Saudi Arabia
- Liberation and Defense of Kuwait

War on Terrorism

- Operation Iraqi Freedom
- Operation Enduring Freedom
- Operation Freedom's Sentinel

=== Decorations ===
- Presidential Unit Citation (Army), Streamer embroidered TUNISIA
- Presidential Unit Citation (Navy), Streamer embroidered IRAQ 2003
- Valorous Unit Award, Streamer embroidered IRAQ (3d Battalion, 27th Field Artillery, cited; DA GO 14, 1993)
- Meritorious Unit Commendation (Army), Streamer embroidered AFGHANISTAN 2006-2011
- French Croix de Guerre with Palm, World War II, Streamer embroidered CENTRAL ITALY

== Distinctive unit insignia ==
Description
A Gold color metal and enamel device 1 inch (2.54 cm) in height overall consisting of a shield blazoned Gules, a bend fracted Or, and attached below the shield a Gold scroll inscribed “CONJUNCTI STAMUS” in black letters.
Symbolism
The shield is red for artillery. The bend fracted represents the break in the history of the organization between its origin as a World War I unit and its reconstitution in 1923.
Background
The distinctive unit insignia was originally approved for the 27th Field Artillery Regiment, Regular Army Inactive on 28 May 1935. It was redesignated for the 27th Field Artillery Battalion (Armored) on 11 September 1940. It was amended to correct the unit designation to the 27th Field Artillery Battalion on 7 November 1940. It was redesignated for the 27th Constabulary Squadron on 4 December 1946. The insignia was redesignated for the 27th Armored Field Artillery Battalion on 19 September 1952. It was redesignated for the 27th Artillery Regiment on 5 December 1957. It was redesignated for the 27th Field Artillery Regiment on 8 December 1971. The insignia was amended to reflect the current history on 18 July 1984.

== Coat of arms ==
=== Blazon ===
Shield
Gules, a bend fracted Or.
Crest
On a wreath of the colors Or and Gules, issuing fesswise to the dexter and sinister from an escallop of the first, two demi-battering rams Vert banded and headed Argent ringed and armed of the first ensigned with a star-shot of seven spikes of the fourth flammant of the like bearing a roundel barry of six of the first and second.
Motto
CONJUNCTI STAMUS (United We Stand)

=== Symbolism ===
Shield
The shield is red for artillery. The bend fracted represents the break in the history of the organization between its origin as a World War I unit and its reconstitution in 1923.
Crest
The star-shot is a medieval missile provided with spikes for inflicting extra damage. It simulates the blazing star on the shield of the province of Salerno in central Italy. The gold and red bars on the roundel are from the arms of the city of Salerno. The star-shot and roundel represent the unit’s outstanding role in the invasion of Salerno. The spikes are seven in number in reference to the seven World War II campaigns in which the organization participated. The escallop shell refers to the Mediterranean Sea from which the unit launched an assault landing in North Africa, which is represented by the two battering rams.
Background
The coat of arms was originally approved for the 27th Field Artillery Regiment, Regular Army Inactive on 31 May 1935. It was redesignated for the 27th Field Artillery Battalion (Armored) on 11 September 1940. It was amended to correct the unit designation to the 27th Field Artillery Battalion on 7 November 1940. It was redesignated for the 27th Constabulary Squadron on 3 December 1946. The insignia was redesignated for the 27th Armored Field Artillery Battalion on 19 September 1952. It was redesignated for the 27th Artillery Regiment on 5 December 1957. It was amended to add a crest on 9 November 1964. It was redesignated for the 27th Field Artillery Regiment on 8 December 1971. The coat of arms was amended to reflect the current history on 18 July 1984.

== Current configuration ==
- 1st Battalion 27th Field Artillery Regiment (United States)
- 2nd Battalion 27th Field Artillery Regiment (United States)
- 3rd Battalion 27th Field Artillery Regiment (United States)
- 4th Battalion 27th Field Artillery Regiment (United States)
- 5th Battalion 27th Field Artillery Regiment (United States)
- 6th Battalion 27th Field Artillery Regiment (United States)

== Notable personnel ==
- Paul D. Phillips, former Commanding Officer; former oldest living West Point graduate, retired as a Brigadier General.

== See also ==
- Field Artillery Branch (United States)
