= David Hodne =

US Army general

David M. Hodne
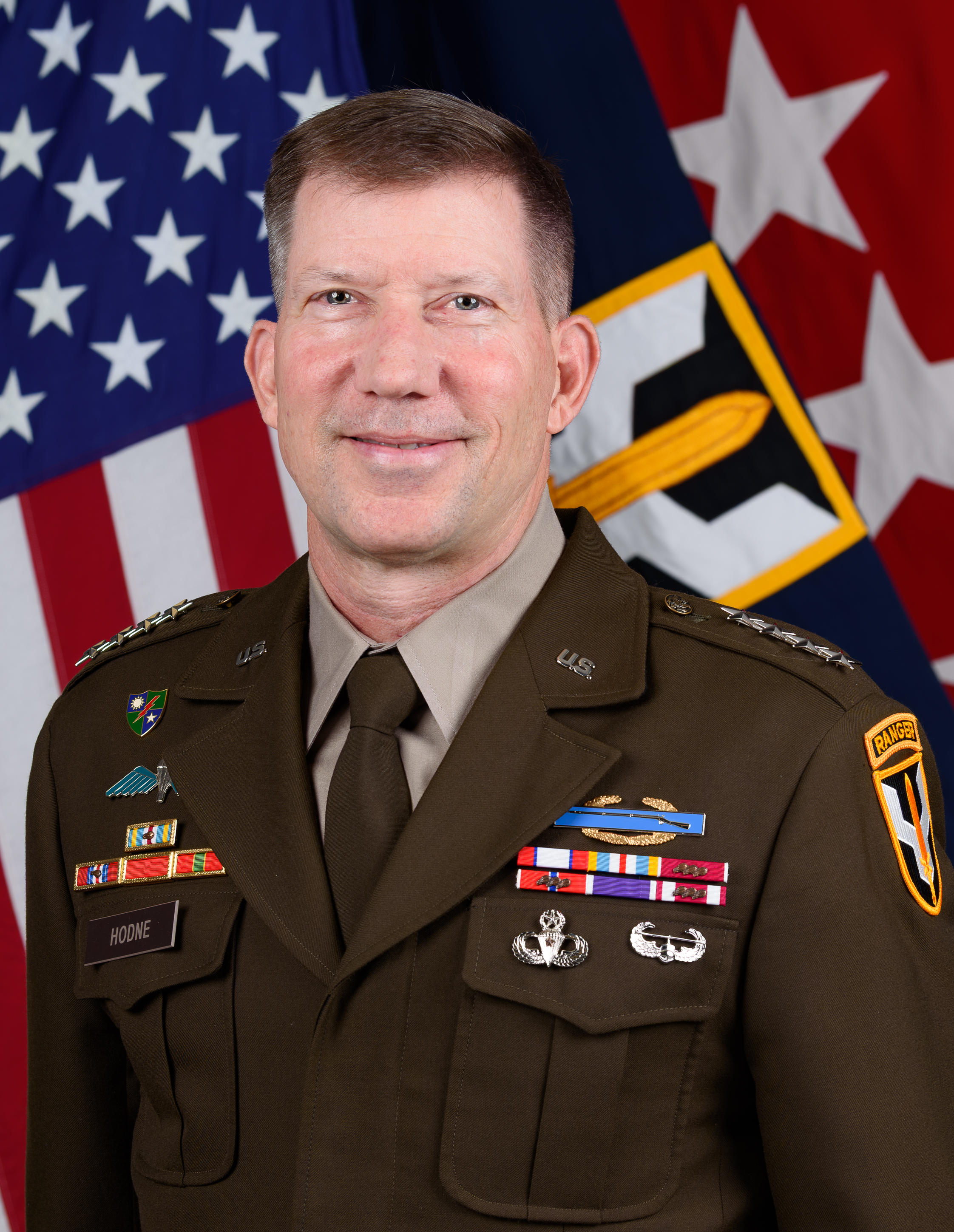
- Official portrait, 2025
- Born: 30 November 1969 (age 56); New York, U.S.
- Education: United States Military Academy (BS); American Military University (MA)
- Spouse: Shelley Hodne
- Military career
- Allegiance: United States
- Branch: United States Army
- Service years: 1991–2026
- Rank: General
- Commands: United States Army Transformation and Training Command; Futures and Concepts Center; 4th Infantry Division; United States Army Infantry School; 1st Stryker Brigade Combat Team, 4th Infantry Division; 2nd Battalion, 75th Ranger Regiment; 3rd Squadron, 4th Cavalry Regiment
- Conflicts: Gulf War; War in Afghanistan; Iraq War
- Awards: Army Distinguished Service Medal; Defense Superior Service Medal; Legion of Merit (3); Bronze Star Medal (4); Purple Heart

David Matthew Hodne (born 30 November 1969) is a retired United States Army general who last served as the commanding general of United States Army Transformation and Training Command from 2 October 2025 to 2 April 2026. He previously served as deputy commanding general for futures and concepts of United States Army Futures Command, and director of the Futures and Concepts Center since 9 January 2024 to 2 October 2025. Prior to that, he served as the commanding general of the 4th Infantry Division and Fort Carson from 2021 to 2023. He previously served as the 59th commandant of the United States Army Infantry School and chief of infantry of the Army (dual-hatted as director of the Soldier Lethality Cross-Functional Team) from 2018 to 2021. He was asked to resign on 2 April 2026 by Secretary of Defense Pete Hegseth.

== Early life ==
Hodne and his twin brother Daniel are the sons of Thomas and Ruth Hodne. Thomas is a disabled military veteran. Daniel is also a 1991 West Point graduate, who retired from the army as a colonel in 2017.

David graduated from Clarkstown High School South in 1987.

== Military career ==
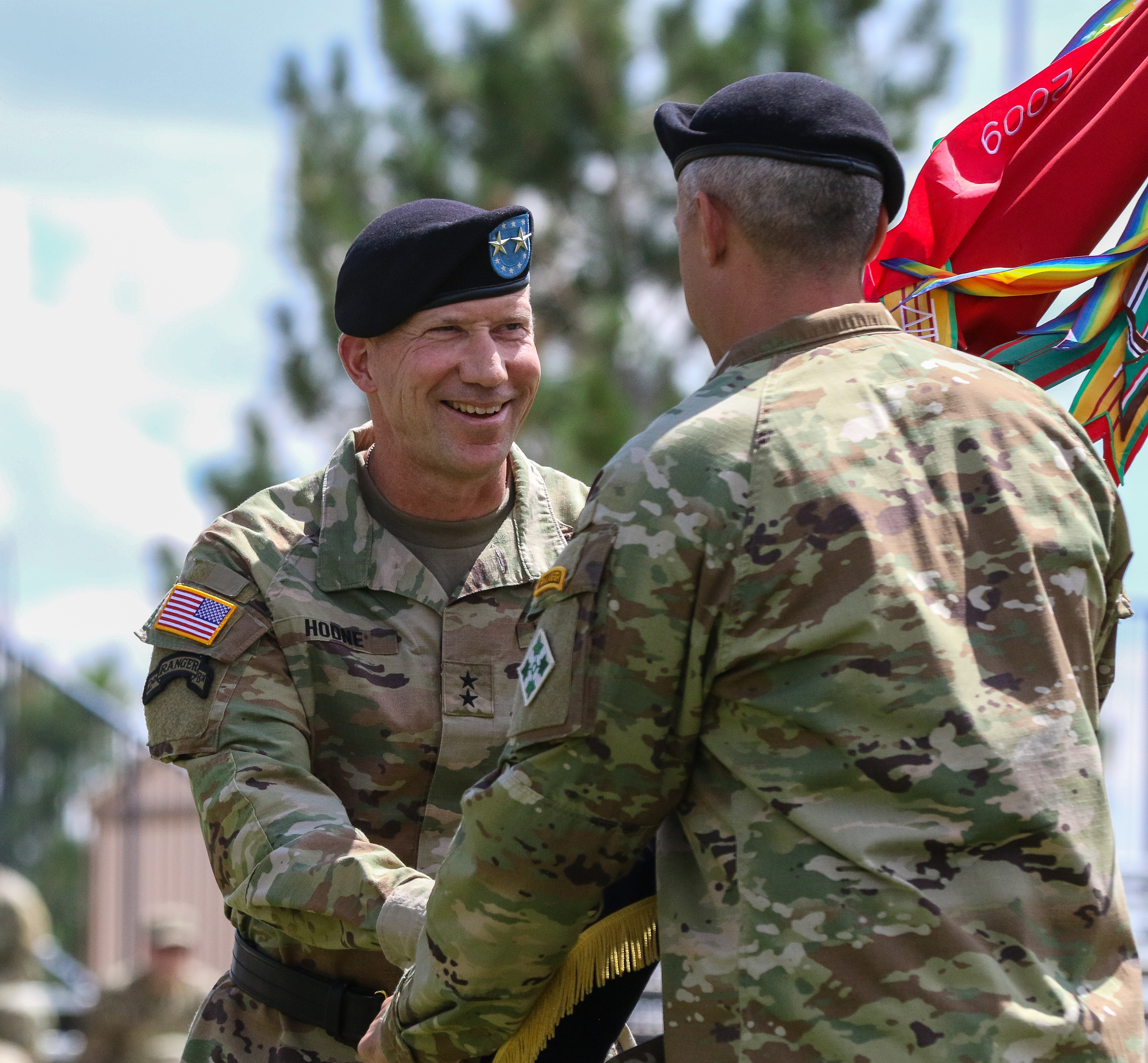
Hodne, incoming commanding general of the 4th Infantry Division, passes the unit colors to Command Sergeant Major Adam Nash during the division change of command ceremony, 19 August 2021.

Hodne attended the United States Military Academy, graduating in 1991 with a Bachelor of Science degree in aerospace engineering. He later earned a Master of Arts in military studies in unconventional warfare from the American Military University. After completing the Ranger Indoctrination Program, known today as the Ranger Assessment and Selection Program, he was assigned to the 2nd Ranger Battalion, 75th Ranger Regiment. He served multiple tours of duty to both Iraq and Afghanistan in support of the Gulf War and the war on terror. Hodne, then a Major, was the officer in charge of operations and planning of the mission during which Pat Tillman was killed.

Hodne has commanded the United States Army Infantry School. He served as the commanding general of the 4th Infantry Division in Fort Carson, Colorado, assuming command on 19 August 2021, and relinquishing it to David S. Doyle on 13 June 2023.

In April 2023, Hodne was nominated for promotion to lieutenant general with assignment as the deputy commanding general of futures and concepts of United States Army Futures Command. In July 2025, he was nominated for promotion to general.

Hodne was one of the three senior Army officers fired by Secretary of Defense Pete Hegseth on 2 April 2026, along with Chief of Staff of the United States Army General Randy George and William Green Jr., the Chief of Chaplains of the United States Army.

== Personal life ==
Hodne is married to fellow 1991 West Point graduate Shelley Ann Berry, who retired from the army as a colonel in 2012.

== Awards and decorations ==
Hodne has been awarded the following decorations during his military career:

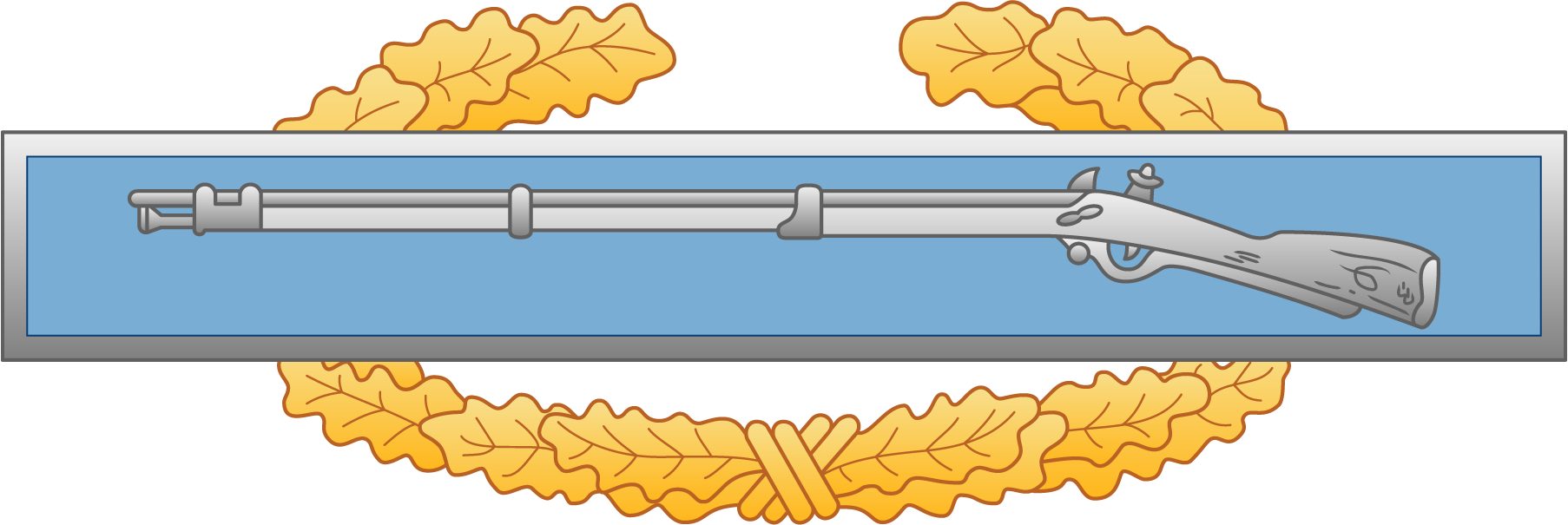

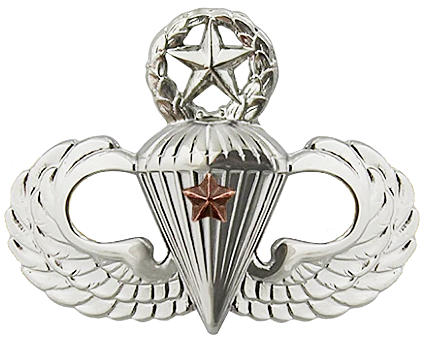

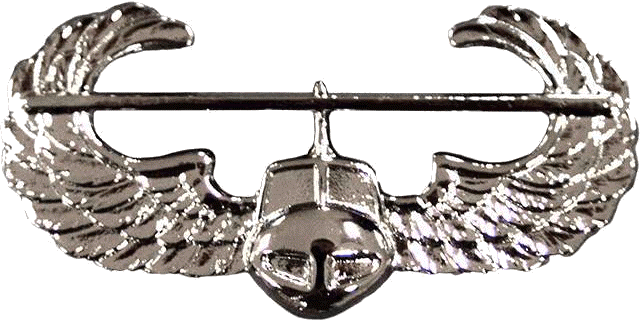

Badge	Master Combat Infantryman Badge		
1st row	Army Distinguished Service Medal	Defense Superior Service Medal	Legion of Merit with 1 Oak leaf cluster (2 awards)
2nd row	Bronze Star with 3 bronze Oak leaf clusters (4 awards)	Purple Heart	Meritorious Service Medal with 3 bronze Oak leaf clusters (4 awards)
3rd row	Joint Service Commendation Medal	Army Commendation Medal with 4 bronze Oak leaf clusters (5 awards)	Navy and Marine Corps Commendation Medal
4th row	Air Force Commendation Medal	Army Achievement Medal	National Defense Service Medal with 1 Service star
5th row	Southwest Asia Service Medal with 1 bronze Campaign star	Afghanistan Campaign Medal with 3 bronze Campaign stars	Iraq Campaign Medal with 3 bronze Campaign stars
6th row	Global War on Terrorism Expeditionary Medal with 1 bronze Campaign star	Global War on Terrorism Service Medal	Army Service Ribbon
7th row	Army Overseas Service Ribbon	NATO Medal for service with ISAF	Kuwait Liberation Medal (Kuwait)
8th row	Joint Meritorious Unit Award with 1 bronze Oak leaf cluster	Valorous Unit Award with 1 bronze Oak leaf cluster	Meritorious Unit Commendation
Badges	Ranger Tab	Master Parachutist Badge with 1 combat jump star	Air Assault Badge

Other accoutrements
Expert Infantryman Badge
2nd Ranger Battalion Combat Service Identification Badge
75th Ranger Regiment Distinctive unit insignia
United Kingdom Parachutist Badge
7 Overseas Service Bars

Military offices
Preceded by Joel Tyler	Commander of the 1st Stryker Brigade Combat Team, 4th Infantry Division; 2013–2017	Succeeded by Curtis D. Taylor
Preceded by Chris Donahue	Deputy Commanding General (Maneuver) of the 4th Infantry Division; 2017–2018	Succeeded by Kevin D. Admiral
Preceded by Townley R. Hedrick	Commandant of the United States Army Infantry School and Chief of Infantry; 2018–2021	Succeeded by Larry Q. Burris Jr.
Preceded by Matthew W. McFarlane	Commanding General of the 4th Infantry Division; 2021–2023	Succeeded by David S. Doyle
Preceded by D. Scott McKean	Deputy Commanding General for Futures and Concepts of the United States Army Futures Command; 2024–2025	Succeeded by Michael C. McCurry II
New command	Commanding General of the United States Army Transformation and Training Command; 2025–2026	Vacant
