= John C. Bennett (general) =

United States Army general and White House aide (1923–1980)

- c. 1971
- Born: 6 December 1923; Washington, D.C., United States
- Died: 4 May 1980 (aged 56); Near Anchorage, Alaska, United Srares
- Education: US Miltary Academy, BS 1945; Columbia University, MA 1951; George Washington University, MA 1964
- Spouse: Jean Hazelton MacKenzie
- Children: 4
- Military career
- Allegiance: United States
- Branch: United States Army
- Service years: 1945–1972
- Rank: Major General
- Service number: 0-27263
- Unit: Infantry Branch
- Commands: 4th Infantry Division
- Conflicts: World War II; Occupation of Germany; Korean War; Vietnam War
- Awards: Purple Heart, Legion of Merit (Oak Leaf Cluster), Bronze Star, Distinguished Service Medal, Air Medal (Oak Leaf Cluster), Army Commendation Medal (Oak Leaf Cluster), Armed Forces Honor Medal, World War II Victory Medal, American Campaign Medal, Army of Occupation Medal (Germany), European-African-Middle Eastern Campaign Medal, Combat Infantryman Badge, United Nations Service Medal, Korean Service Medal, Vietnam Service Medal, Joint Service Commendation Medal, Master Parachutist Badge

John Charles Bennett (December 6, 1923 – May 4, 1980) was a U.S. Army general, public official, and natural gas company executive.

Born in Washington, D.C., he was a graduate of the US Military Academy at West Point. After service in Korea and Vietnam, Bennett commanded the 4th Infantry Division, Ft. Carson Colorado, and served in the Nixon White House, where he had custody of the Nixon White House Tapes.

== Military career ==
Bennett attended West Point from 1942 to 1945 and was commissioned as a second lieutenant on June 5, 1945, and assigned to occupation forces in Germany guarding former Nazi leaders in support of the International Military Tribunal at Nuremberg.

In Korea, Captain Bennett was a company commander in the 7th Infantry Division (1953–54).

Lieutenant Colonel Bennett served in Vietnam from August 1965 to June 1966 as deputy commander of the 5th Special Forces Group. Among his duties was implementing the CIDG program whose goal was to help villagers defend themselves against Viet Cong attacks.

From 1967 to 1968 Colonel Bennett was chief of staff, 82nd Airborne Division, Fort Bragg.

Brigadier General Bennett was deputy commanding general of U.S. Army Alaska (USARAL) based at Fort Wainwright, Alaska (1968–69). In 1969–70 he served as chief of staff of the Alaska Air Command on Elmendorf AFB.

=== Commanding General 4th Infantry Division ===
Major General Bennett commanded the 4th Infantry Division (Mechanized) and Fort Carson, Colorado (1971–72). There he was instrumental in the implementation of Project VOLAR (Volunteer Army) at Fort Carson.

== Post-military career ==
Bennett retired to Anchorage, Alaska in August 1972 to begin his business career and worked at Alaska Pacific Bank, ERA Helicopters and El Paso Natural Gas Company. During his retirement he crusaded for two major Alaska projects, the All-Alaska Gas Pipeline project and the proposed 1984 World's Fair in Anchorage.

=== Nixon White House staff ===
Bennett served in the Nixon White House as deputy assistant to the president under Alexander Haig (1973–74). In July 1973 he was given custody of the Nixon White House Tapes, and on his own initiative started keeping a log of who accessed the tapes. Prior to Bennett's custody, no records were kept as to who accessed the tapes. On 7 November 1973 in testimony to the United States District Court for the District of Columbia, Judge John Sirica, presiding, Bennett revealed the existence of the 18 1/2-minute gap in the tape made on June 20, 1972, three days after the Watergate break-in. The gap was during a conversation between Nixon and Chief of Staff H. R. Haldeman, and it is widely assumed that the two had discussed the break-in during the erased portion. Only three people had access to the tapes, including Rose Mary Woods. The tapes were ultimately a factor in causing Nixon to resign the Presidency.

== Death ==
Bennett died in a plane crash on May 4, 1980, while piloting his Cessna float plane near Anchorage, Alaska. He was the sole occupant of the plane.

== Personal life ==
Bennett was the son of Major General Ivan L. Bennett and brother of Dr. Ivan L. Bennett Jr.

Bennett married Jean Hazelton MacKenzie on Sep. 8, 1945. They had four children.
