= Walter K. Wilson Sr. =

US Army major general (1880–1954)

Walter K. Wilson
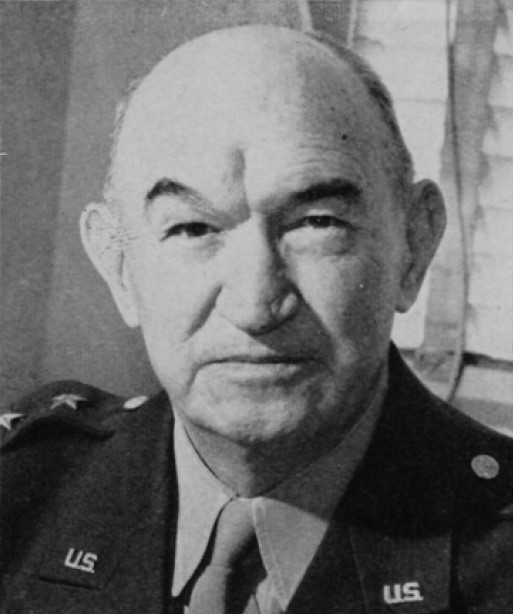
- Wilson as a major general, c. 1942
- Born: 7 October 1880; Nashville, Tennessee, US
- Died: 20 January 1954 (aged 73); Washington, DC, US
- Burial place: Arlington National Cemetery
- Alma mater: United States Military Academy; United States Army War College
- Spouse: Evangeline Taylor (m. 1904–1954)
- Children: 2 (including Walter K. Wilson Jr.)
- Military career
- Service: United States Army
- Service years: 1902–1946
- Rank: Major General
- Nickname: Windy (Note: Wilson's West Point classmates nicknamed him "Windy" after a voluble member of a previous class whose last name was also Wilson.)
- Service number: 01700
- Unit: US Army Coast Artillery Corps
- Commands: 47th Coast Artillery Company; Fort Hunt; Cablegram Section, United States Department of War; Statistics Branch, United States Department of War; Coastal Defenses of San Diego; Southern California Border District; Fort Ruger; 16th Coast Artillery Regiment; 55th Coast Artillery Regiment; War Plans and Training Branch, United States Department of War; Provisional Regiment, U.S. Military Academy; 2nd Coast Artillery District; Harbor Defenses of Manila and Subic Bay; III Corps; 9th Coast Artillery District; Northern California Sector, Western Defense Command
- Wars: World War I World War II
- Awards: Army Distinguished Service Medal (2); Legion of Merit
- Other work: Director, Army Emergency Relief

Walter K. Wilson (7 October 1880 – 20 January 1954) was a career officer in the United States Army. A veteran of World War I and World War II, he served from 1902 until 1946 and attained the rank of major general. Wilson was a specialist in Coast Artillery and his commands included the Harbor Defenses of Manila and Subic Bay, III Corps, the 9th Coast Artillery District, and the Northern California Sector of the Western Defense Command.

A native of Nashville, Tennessee, Wilson was raised and educated in Nashville before attending the United States Military Academy at West Point. He graduated in 1902 and was commissioned as a second lieutenant of Artillery. When the Artillery branch split into Field Artillery and Coast Artillery, Wilson chose to serve with the Coast Artillery. Early assignments included adjutant of the Artillery District of Pensacola, which was based at Fort Barrancas, Florida. After completion of the basic and advanced courses for Artillery officers, he served as assistant to the army's Chief of Coast Artillery and commander of the 47th Coast Artillery Company. During World War I, he was in charge of the Cablegram Section of the United States Department of War and was responsible for coordinating communications between the War Department and the American Expeditionary Forces in France.

After the First World War, Wilson graduated from the United States Army War College and commanded the army's Coastal Defenses of San Diego and Southern California Border District, as well as the post at Fort Ruger, Hawaii Territory. Senior commands during World War II included the 2nd Coast Artillery District in New York City and the 9th Coast Artillery District in San Francisco. From January 1944 through the end of the war, he served as director of Army Emergency Relief (AER); retired for disability after a heart attack in June 1944, he was immediately recalled to active duty and continued as AER director. He retired from the military in 1946 and continued as the civilian director of AER until retiring in 1951. He died in Washington, DC, on 20 January 1954 and was buried at Arlington National Cemetery.

== Early life ==
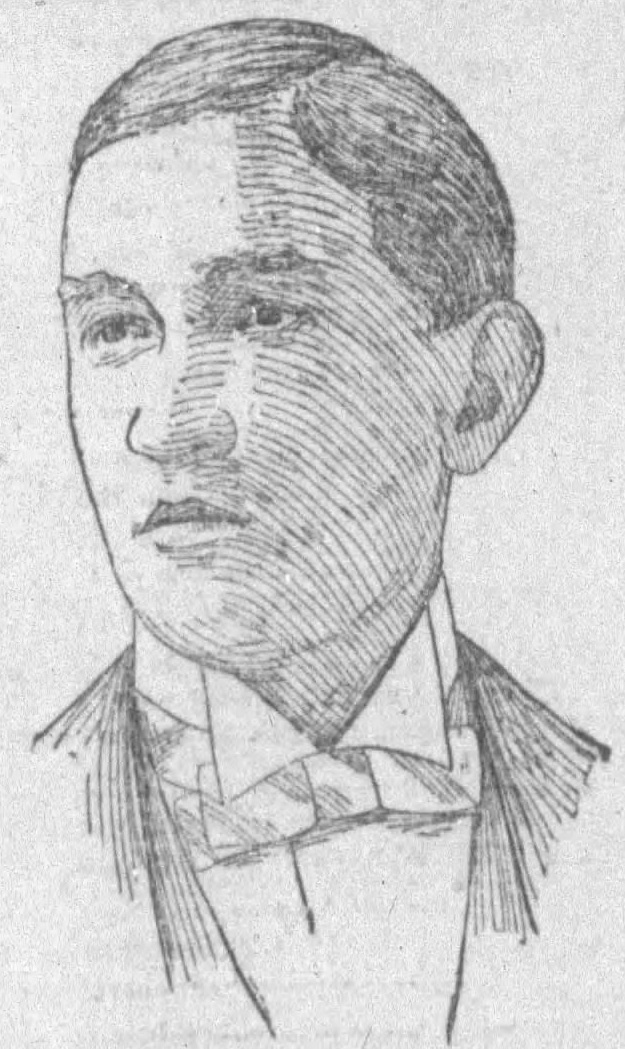
Wilson at the time of his acceptance to West Point in 1898

Walter King Wilson was born in Nashville, Tennessee on October 7, 1880, a son of James Edward Wilson and Mary E. (Williamson) Wilson. He was raised and educated in Nashville, and was an 1897 graduate of Fogg High School. Wilson completed his high school education with academic honors and was chosen as his class salutatorian. In June 1897, he applied for admission to the United States Military Academy at West Point. He finished first of 23 applicants on the competitive examination offered by US Representative John W. Gaines and was appointed in April 1898.

Wilson attended West Point from 1898 to 1902 and graduated in June 1902 ranked 27th of 54. His classmates who also became general officers included John Knowles Herr and William A. McCain. Among his prominent classmates who did not attain general officer rank were Adam Casad and Harry Nelly. At graduation, Wilson was commissioned a second lieutenant of Artillery.

=== Family ===
In May 1904, Wilson married Evangeline Taylor, whom he met while he was serving at Vancouver Barracks, and they were the parents of two sons. Walter K. Wilson Jr. (1906–1985) was a career army officer who attained the rank of lieutenant general. Lieutenant Colonel John N. Wilson (1913–1944) was a career army officer who died while commanding a Field Artillery Battalion in Europe during World War II.

== Start of career ==
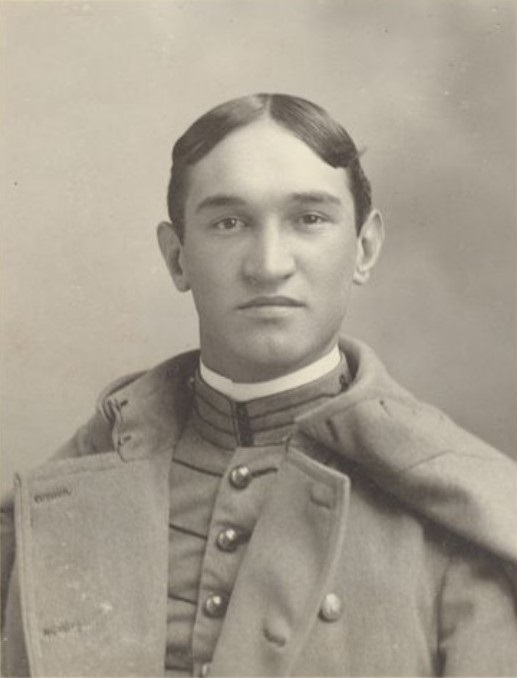
Wilson as a West Point cadet in 1902

After receiving his commission, Wilson was posted to Vancouver Barracks, Washington and assigned to the 8th Battery of Field Artillery. His unit was subsequently transferred to Fort D. A. Russell, Wyoming, and Wilson remained with his battery until July 1905. His next assignment was with the 2nd Provisional Artillery Regiment at Fort Sill, Oklahoma, where he served until November 1905. He was then transferred to the 22nd Coast Artillery Company at Fort Barrancas, Florida, where he served until August 1906. From August 1906 to August 1909, Wilson remained at Fort Barrancas as adjutant of the Artillery District of Pensacola, and he was promoted to first lieutenant in January 1907.

From August 1909 to August 1911, Wilson was a student at Fort Monroe's Artillery School; he completed the basic course for officers as an honor graduate in 1910 and graduated from the advanced course for officers in 1911. He received promotion to captain in the Coast Artillery in April 1911. After completing the Artillery School courses, Wilson remained at the school as an instructor in the Department of Engineering and Mine Defense. From March to December 1912, he was assigned to Washington, DC as assistant to the Chief of Coast Artillery. From December 1912 to January 1915, he commanded the 47th Coast Artillery Company and the post at Fort Hunt, Virginia. From February 1915 to October 1917, he served again as assistant to the Chief of Coast Artillery.

== Continued career ==
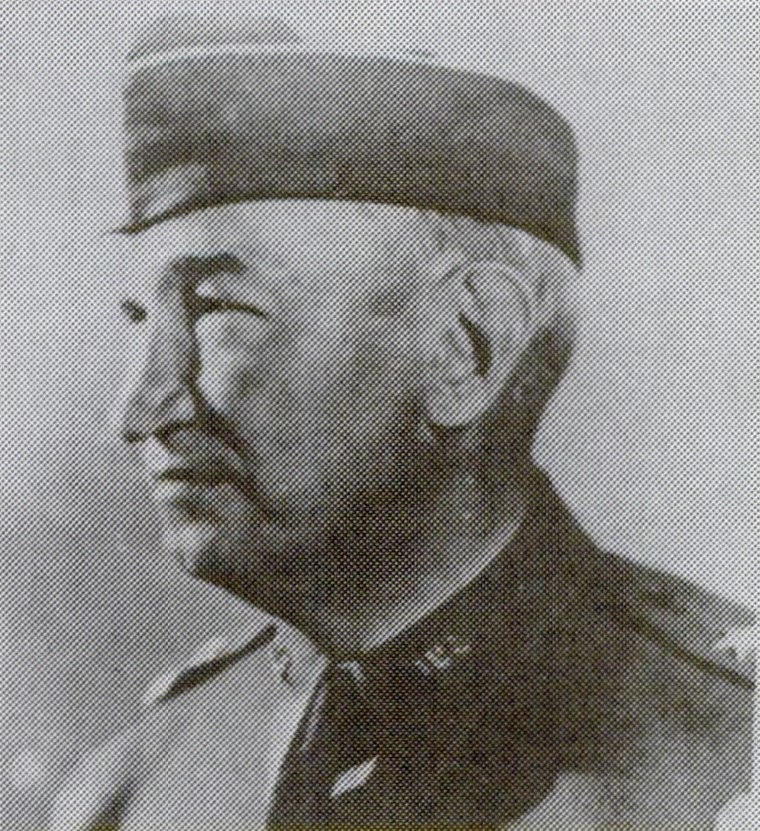
Wilson as III Corps commander in 1941

American entry into World War I occurred in April 1917, and in August Wilson was promoted to temporary major. In October 1917, Wilson was assigned to duty with the War Department General Staff. During the First World War, cablegram was the primary means of communication between the American Expeditionary Forces headquarters in France and the War Department. During the early stages of US involvement, the War Department was barraged with AEF requisitions for troops, equipment, supplies, and weapons, resulting in long delays in providing support to the AEF. Wilson was assigned as officer in charge of the War Department's Cable Section, where his successful implementation of a system to receive, route, and take action on incoming cables improved AEF readiness by significantly reducing processing time. His service at the War Department was deemed so critical that the Chief of Coast Artillery declined several by name requests from AEF commander John J. Pershing for Wilson's services. Wilson received promotion to temporary lieutenant colonel in May 1918 and advancement to temporary colonel in September 1918.

Following the Armistice of November 11, 1918, from November 1918 to January 1919, Wilson carried an observation and inspection tour of battlefields in France. From January to August 1921, he served as officer in charge of the War Department's statistics branch. Wilson attended the United States Army War College from August 1921 to July 1922. After graduating, he was posted to Fort Rosecrans, California, where he commanded the army's Coastal Defenses of San Diego and Southern California Border District. From November 1922 to May 1925, Wilson commanded Fort Ruger, Hawaii Territory, which also included periods in command of the 16th Coast Artillery Regiment and 55th Coast Artillery Regiment. He received promotion to lieutenant colonel in February 1925.

== Later career ==
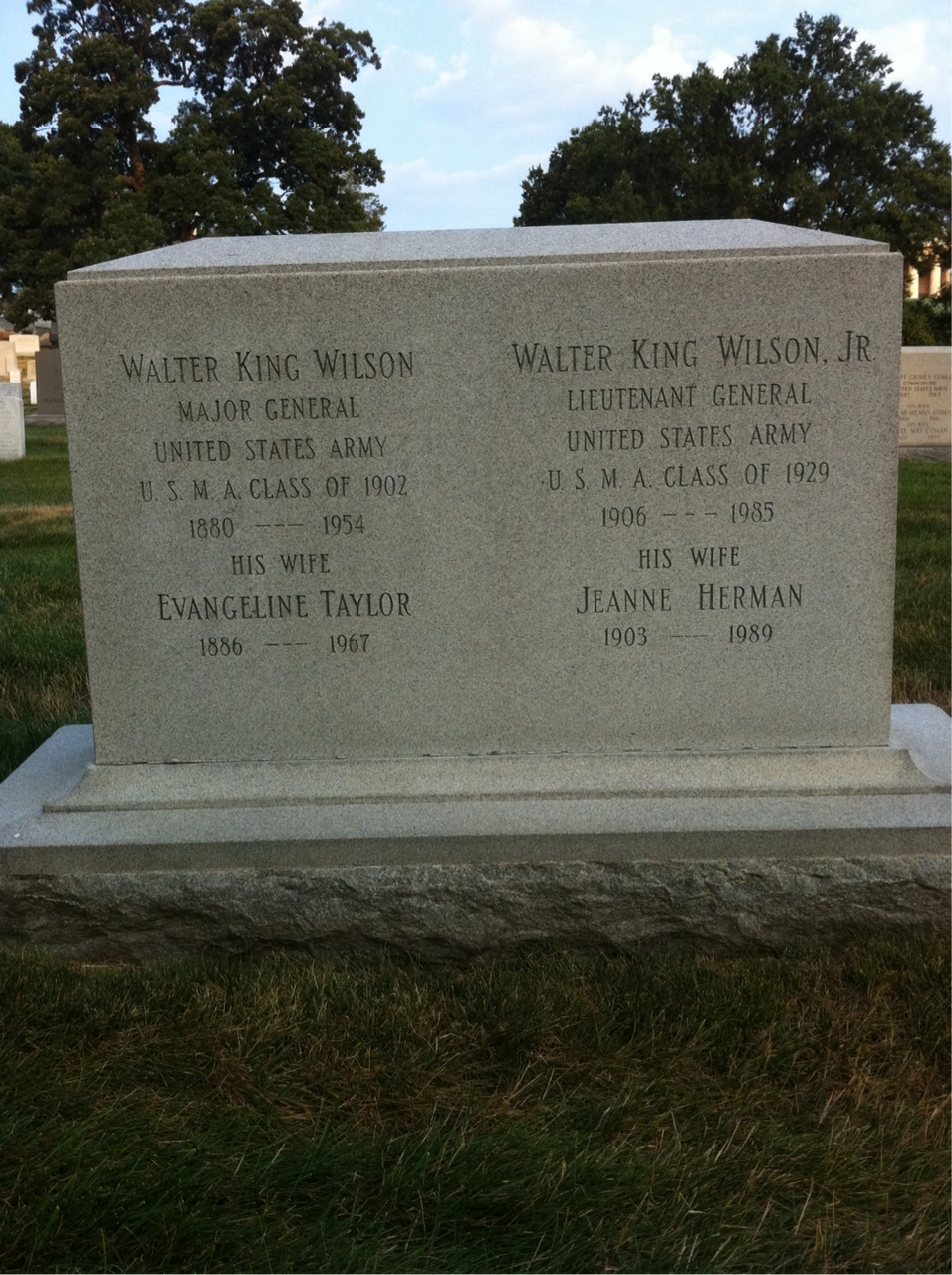
Wilson's gravestone at Arlington National Cemetery

From June 1925 to May 1929, Wilson served on the War Department staff as a member of the Military Intelligence division and later as chief of the war plans and training branch. In May 1929, he was assigned as executive officer of the U.S. Military Academy and commander of a provisional regiment. He was promoted to colonel in March 1934 and in March 1935, he was assigned to Omaha, Nebraska and appointed chief of staff of the Seventh Corps Area. He was promoted to brigadier general in May 1937 and commanded the 2nd Coast Artillery District in New York City from May 1937 to January 1938. Wilson was then posted to the Philippines, where he was assigned to command the harbor defenses of Manila and Subic Bay.

With the army expanding in anticipation of American entry into World War II, in December 1940, Wilson was assigned to lead the III Corps at the Presidio of San Francisco, which he organized and trained until July 1941. He then assumed command of the 9th Coast Artillery District with headquarters in San Francisco, and beginning in December 1941 he commanded the 9th Coast Artillery District, III Corps, and the Northern California Sector of the Western Defense Command. In January 1944, Wilson was assigned to the War Department headquarters as director of Army Emergency Relief (AER). In June 1944, he experienced a heart attack and was retired for disability four months before reaching the mandatory retirement age of 64. He was immediately recalled to active duty, and continued as director of AER through the end of the war. He retired again in November 1946.

After retiring from the army, Wilson resided in Washington, DC and continued as the civilian director of Army Emergency Relief until retiring in 1951. His civic and professional association memberships included the American Legion, Sons of the American Revolution, and the Army and Navy Club of Washington, D.C. His wife and he were members of Washington's Church of the Pilgrims, where he taught a men's Bible class. Wilson died at Walter Reed Army Hospital on 20 January 1954. He was buried at Arlington National Cemetery.

== Awards ==
Wilson's awards included the Army Distinguished Service Medal with oak leaf cluster and the Legion of Merit.

=== First Distinguished Service Medal citation ===
The President of the United States of America, authorized by Act of Congress, July 9, 1918, takes pleasure in presenting the Army Distinguished Service Medal to Colonel (Coast Artillery Corps) Walter King Wilson (ASN: 0-1700), United States Army, for exceptionally meritorious and distinguished services to the Government of the United States, in a duty of great responsibility during World War I, in the organization and administration of the Cable Service of the War Department in the United States, thereby enabling that service to meet the excessive demands made upon it during the war.

Service: United States Army Rank: Colonel (Coast Artillery Corps) Division: Cable Service Action Date: World War I Orders: War Department, General Orders No. 18 (1919)

=== Second Distinguished Service Medal citation ===
The President of the United States of America, authorized by Act of Congress, July 9, 1918, takes pleasure in presenting a Bronze Oak Leaf Cluster in lieu of a Second Award of the Army Distinguished Service Medal to Major General Walter King Wilson (ASN: 0-1700), United States Army, for exceptionally meritorious and distinguished services to the Government of the United States, in a duty of great responsibility, as Executive Director, Army Emergency Relief, from January 1944 to September 1945, and as the Secretary of War’s Liaison Officer with the American Red Cross from June 1944 to September 1945. In the latter assignment, General Wilson was responsible for scrutinizing all War Department and Army policies related to Red Cross activities, and was given the duty as representative and under the direction of the Secretary of War of resolving questions of doubt, difficulty, or conflict of mission. With keen foresight, superior judgment, initiative, diplomacy, knowledge of sound business organization and outstanding leadership, he administered Army Emergency Relief and brought about a very close relationship between the American Red Cross and the Army in rendering emergency financial assistance to hundreds of thousands of soldiers and their dependents, which aided materially in achieving high morale not only within the Army but also among the dependents of Army personnel.

Service: United States Army Rank: Major General Division: Army Emergency Relief Action Date: January 1944 – September 1945 Orders: War Department, General Orders No. 97 (1945)

=== Legion of Merit citation ===
To: Walter K. Wilson, Major General, U. S. Army.

For: Exceptionally meritorious conduct in the performance of outstanding service as commanding general, Third Army Corps and Southern California Sector, Western Defense Command, from December 22, 1941, to April 30, 1942, and as commanding general, Northern California Sector, Western Defense Command, from May 1, 1942, to January 6, 1944. With keen foresight, aggressiveness, initiative, and superior qualities of leadership, he developed the plans and the organization of his command in such an outstanding manner that his units have constantly been prepared to meet any threat from enemy action against the coast of the United States. He has at all times exhibited the utmost tact and diplomacy in meeting the problems incident to contact with the civilian population and agencies within the geographical location of his command. General Wilson, by his vigorous action and close personal supervision, aided materially in the effective evacuation of enemy aliens and persons of Japanese ancestry from the area of his command, with the result that the threat of extensive sabotage was removed before any damage could be inflicted.

Service: United States Army Rank: Major General Division: Northern California Sector Action Date: December 22, 1941 – January 6, 1944 Orders: Western Defense Command (1944)

== Effective dates of rank ==
Wilson's dates of rank were:

- Second Lieutenant, 12 June 1902
- First Lieutenant, 25 January 1907
- Captain, 4 April 1911
- Major (National Army), 5 August 1917
- Lieutenant Colonel (National Army), 17 May 1918
- Colonel (National Army), 6 September 1918
- Major, 30 June 1920
- Lieutenant Colonel, 15 February 1925
- Colonel, 26 May 1934
- Brigadier General, 7 May 1937
- Major General (Army of the United States), 25 October 1940
- Major General, 1 April 1941
- Major General (Retired), 30 June 1944
- Major General (Recalled), 1 July 1944
- Major General (Retired), 30 November 1946
