= Coast Guard Mutual Assistance =

American non-profit organization

- Founded: 1924 (As League of Coast Guard Women)
- Type: 501(c)(3) nonprofit, official relief society
- Tax ID no.: 31-1801931
- Headquarters: Arlington, VA
- Region served: United States and International
- Services: Grants and Interest-Free Loans
- Key people: Admiral Kevin Lunday (Chair); Captain Chris Hulser (President); Brooke Millard, USCG (Ret) (CEO)
- Employees: 16 FTE
- Volunteers: 600
- Website: www.mycgma.org

Coast Guard Mutual Assistance (CGMA) is a nonprofit charitable organization and the official relief society of the United States Coast Guard. Founded in 1924, CGMA provides financial support to the entire Coast Guard community-- including active duty members, civilian employees, reservists, auxiliarists, retirees, and their families--primarily through interest-free loans and personal grants. Headquartered in Arlington, Virginia, CGMA offers more than 40 programs that address emergency relief, education, family support, and day-to-day financial hardship.

CGMA is entirely funded by donations, many of which come from the Coast Guard community itself. Its motto, Helping Our Own, reflects the Coast Guard tradition of personnel looking after one another in times of need. Since its founding, CGMA has provided over $260 million in direct financial assistance to Coast Guard members and families.

The organization holds a four-star rating from Charity Navigator and has received the Platinum Seal of Transparency from Candid, the highest ratings awarded by both independent charity evaluators.

== Governance ==
CGMA is governed by a board of directors representative of the Coast Guard community it serves. The officers of the corporation include the Commandant of the Coast Guard, the Assistant Commandant for Human Resources, the Master Chief Petty Officer of the Coast Guard, and the Chief Executive Officer of CGMA.

== History ==
Founding (1924)

CGMA traces its origins to 1924, when Mrs. Clara Billard, wife of Rear Admiral Frederick C. Billard - sixth commandant of the U.S. Coast Guard- recognized the need for a formal support system to assist Coast Guard personnel and their families during financial hardship. She organized the League of Coast Guard women, a volunteer organization whose mission was to "minister to the general welfare of the commissioned officers, warrant officers, enlisted men and civilian employees of the Coast Guard and their immediate families."

The League held its First Annual Meeting on November 2, 1925, at Coast Guard Headquarters in Washington, D.C. Admiral Billard, then Commandant, gave the opening address affirming the organization's vital role. By the close of its first year, the League had 668 members organized into 28 units. Its earliest charitable acts included relief for a widow of a serviceman, Christmas assistance to service members in hospitals, and aid to an elderly couple in Maine who had been blinded during Coast Guard service. Annual dues were set at $1.00 per member.

World War II and Coast Guard Welfare (1941)

As the United States prepared to enter World War II, the League of Coast Guard Women's informal mission was insufficient to address the scale of need facing an expanding wartime service. In 1941, Coast Guard Welfare was formally established as an official organization, absorbing and assuming the League's welfare mission under a more structured framework.

The First Annual Meeting of Coast Guard Welfare was held at Coast Guard Headquarters on February 25, 1942. Vice Admiral Russell Waesche addressed the gathering, calling attention to the massive enlargement of the Service during wartime and the corresponding necessity for expanded welfare facilities. He noted that a Coast Guard member was to be treated as the exact parallel of a Navy man, with comparable access to welfare support. Delegates from district units across the country attended, representing thousands of new members and growing demand for assistance from the families of personnel deployed in wartime service.

Post-War Expansion (1940s–1970s)

Following World War II, Coast Guard Welfare expanded its reach throughout the 1940s and 1950s, formalizing its constitution and bylaws and growing its network of local unit representatives. The organization introduced the concept of interest-free emergency loans during this period, enabling Coast Guard families to access funds quickly without the burden of interest charges.

Through the 1960s and early 1970s, the organization continued to broaden its programming. Annual reports from the era document growing assistance with basic living expenses, emergency travel, medical and dental costs, and funeral expenses — categories that remain core to CGMA's mission today. Assistance reached service members across all duty stations, including those stationed overseas.

Renaming and Modernization (1979–1998)

In 1979, the organization was officially renamed Coast Guard Mutual Assistance (CGMA), a name reflecting its identity as a mutual aid society in which all members of the Coast Guard community are encouraged to both give and receive support. The CGMA preamble of this era described the organization as "a welfare fund organized exclusively for educational and charitable purposes" to assist active duty, retired, and reserve personnel and their dependents.

In 1998, CGMA was incorporated in the Commonwealth of Virginia as a 501(c)(3) nonprofit organization, while maintaining its co-location with Coast Guard Personnel Services Command. This formalized CGMA's legal structure and enabled it to expand its endowment and investment activities. During 1998, CGMA provided over $6 million in financial assistance to approximately 8,000 members of the Coast Guard community, a record at that time, including over $120,000 to those affected by Hurricane Georges.

Hurricane Responses (2005)

The 2005 Atlantic hurricane season — which included Hurricane Katrina, Hurricane Rita, and Hurricane Wilma — represented the most significant disaster response in CGMA's history up to that point. With over 28% of the Gulf Region Coast Guard workforce having lost their homes or sustained substantial property damage, CGMA initiated an unprecedented level of financial assistance.

Even before Katrina made landfall in August 2005, CGMA had begun providing financial assistance for evacuation and temporary living expenses. The Coast Guard evacuated over 33,000 hurricane victims in a ten-day period; many of the responders were themselves victims of the storms. CGMA handled approximately 850 hurricane-related cases through the end of the year. In total across 2005, CGMA distributed more than $3 million in direct aid related to the three hurricanes. The organization provided over $7 million in total financial assistance during 2005 — a 20% increase over the prior year — spanning 7,625 cases. In recognition of the scale of this response, CGMA significantly expanded its disaster preparedness infrastructure in subsequent years.

2018–2019 Government Shutdown

The partial federal government shutdown that began at the end of December 2018 and continued into January 2019 created an unprecedented financial crisis for the U.S. Coast Guard. Unlike other military branches, the Coast Guard falls under the Department of Homeland Security rather than the Department of Defense, meaning active duty members were not exempt from the pay lapse. This represented the first time in American history that active duty military personnel went without pay during a government shutdown.

CGMA rapidly mobilized, overcoming extraordinary logistical challenges to deliver financial assistance on a scale never before attempted. Donations poured in from across the country — from other military communities, the private sector, and the general public. A single donation of $15 million from USAA was among the largest in CGMA's history. Over the 35-day shutdown, CGMA ultimately provided $8.4 million in assistance to over 6,200 Coast Guard families, breaking all previous records for a single response. This effort represented the single largest relief operation in CGMA history at that time.

Comparing the typical January performance to January 2019 illustrates the scale: in an average month, CGMA distributes roughly $130,000 to approximately 510 clients. During January 2019, that figure surged to $8.46 million to 6,877 clients.

COVID-19 Pandemic (2020)

The COVID-19 pandemic imposed severe and wide-ranging financial hardships across the Coast Guard community beginning in early 2020. CGMA responded by creating six new assistance programs specifically tailored to pandemic-related needs, including assistance with childcare expenses, lost wages, and quarantine costs. Notably, CGMA's innovative Supplemental Education Grant (SEG) program, initially designed to help Coast Guard families acquire essential resources for remote and online learning, was subsequently adopted and replicated by all three of its sister military relief societies.

In 2020, CGMA provided a record $9.1 million in total assistance to 9,083 Coast Guard members across 12,900 cases. Of this, $4.5 million was specifically COVID-19 related assistance, more than all other military relief societies combined. Additionally, CGMA provided $1.4 million in hurricane assistance to 692 members impacted by the relentless 2020 Gulf Coast hurricane season, responding from within Coast Guard Personnel Support Teams deployed to affected areas.

Centennial (2024)

In 2024, CGMA celebrated its centennial anniversary — 100 years of service to the Coast Guard community. A commemorative celebration was held in November 2024 at the District Winery in Washington, D.C., attended by CGMA's Service Secretary, the Commandant, and the Master Chief Petty Officer of the Coast Guard, along with over 40 Coast Guard Flag Officers and Command Gold Badges.

The organization served over 6,000 cases during the year, delivering $8.5 million in total financial support; $2.9 million of which was in grants. Key areas of need included disaster relief following Hurricanes Beryl, Helene, and Milton, and rental assistance. CEO Rear Admiral Cari Thomas retired in July 2024 after six years of leadership, and was succeeded by Brooke Millard, CDR, USCG (Ret.).

Recent Developments (2025)

Early 2025, CGMA completed a major organizational transition, migrating from its legacy database to a modern platform, enabling online applications for assistance and real-time data monitoring. That year, CGMA delivered $12.1 million in total financial assistance to more than 4,000 Coast Guard members, the highest annual disbursement in the organization's history. This included $3.2 million in grants and $8.9 million in interest-free loans.

A 43-day government shutdown beginning October 1, 2025 — the longest in U.S. history — created severe financial hardship for the Coast Guard's approximately 8,700 civilian employees, who were either furloughed or required to work without pay. CGMA became the only military aid society to provide direct financial support to civilian workers during the shutdown, distributing $1.9 million in interest-free loans to affected civilian employees.

At year's end, CGMA converted $1.48 million in outstanding member loans into outright grants, benefiting 733 Coast Guard members across seven programs. This action increased total grant funding for 2025 to $3.2 million and demonstrated CGMA's strategy of using loans and grants in tandem to promote long-term financial stability.

Major events

- 1924 – The League of Coast Guard Women was founded.
- 1925 - First Annual Meeting Held November 2 at Coast Guard Headquarters: 668 members in 28 units
- 1941 – Coast Guard Welfare is established as U.S. enters World War II, absorbing the League's welfare mission.
- 1942 --First Annual Meeting of Coast Guard Welfare held February 25; Vice Admiral Waesche leads nationwide discussion.
- 1947 - Constitution and Bylaws formally published.
- 1960's- Coast Guard Welfare creates its disaster relief program to help Coast Guard members affected by hurricanes.
- 1979 – The name changes to Coast Guard Mutual Assistance; preamble reaffirms mutual aid mission.
- 1998 – CGMA is incorporated into the Commonwealth of Virginia but maintains co-located with Coast Guard Personnel Services Command.
- 2005 – Record Hurricane Response: CGMA distributes $3 million in direct aid to those affected by hurricanes Katrina, Rita, and Wilma.
- 2013 - Adoption Grant Program launched
- 2015 - Supplemental Education Grant enhanced; online tutoring introduced for active duty and dependents.
- 2017 – CGMA distributes $2.6 million in direct aid to those affected by Hurricanes Harvey, Irma, and Maria and provides $6.3 million to more than 5,200 Coast Guard families through interest-free loans and grants.
- 2018 – CGMA provides $5.3 million in financial aid to ~5,000 Coast Guard families.
- 2019 - CGMA delivers $8.4 million in payroll loans to support 6,200+ Coasties affected by the 35-day lapse of appropriation.
- 2020 - COVID-19 pandemic response: $4.5 million in pandemic aid
- 2022 – CGMA processes 5,408 cases serving 4,270 Coast Guard members, providing $6.7 million in total and $2.4 million in grants.
- 2024- CGMA processes 6,000 cases, delivering $8.5 million in direct support to the Coast Guard community, $2.9 million in grants.
- 2025 - Record $12.1 million in annual assistance; Coastal Grit event launched.
