= Walter K. Wilson Jr. =

United States Army general (1906–1985)

Walter King Wilson Jr.
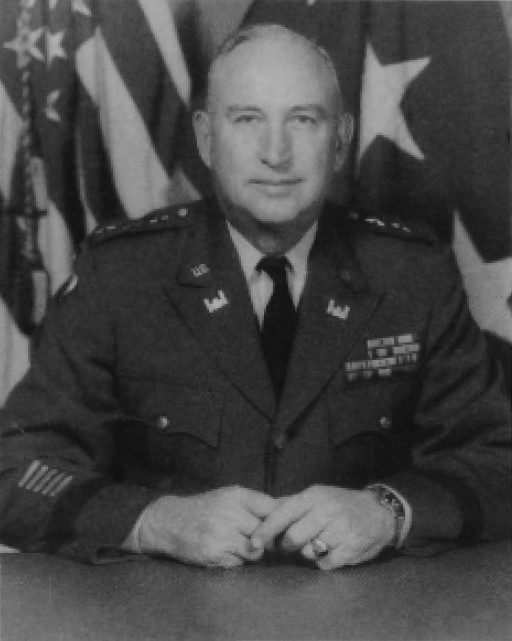
- Lieutenant General Walter K. Wilson Jr.
- Born: August 26, 1906; Fort Barrancas, Florida
- Died: December 6, 1985 (aged 79); Mobile, Alabama
- Military career
- Allegiance: United States of America
- Branch: United States Army
- Service years: 1929–1965
- Rank: Lieutenant General
- Service number: 0-17512
- Unit: United States Army Corps of Engineers
- Commands: Chief of Engineers (1961–65); Army Engineer School; 18th Engineer Brigade; 79th Engineer Combat Regiment
- Conflicts: World War II; Cold War
- Awards: Army Distinguished Service Medal; Legion of Merit (2); Soldier's Medal

Walter King Wilson Jr. (August 26, 1906 – December 6, 1985), was an officer of the United States Army with the rank of lieutenant general. He is most noted as a Chief of Engineers during 1961–65. He was the son of Major General Walter K. Wilson Sr.

== Biography ==
He was born at Fort Barrancas, Florida, the son of artillery officer and World War II Major General Walter K. Wilson Sr. (1880–1954). He graduated from West Point in 1929 and was commissioned in the United States Army Corps of Engineers.

While on maneuvers with Company A, 7th Engineers in a remote part of Fort Benning, Georgia on the night of May 9–10, 1932, Second Lieutenants Wilson and Stephen R. Hanmer (USMA Class of 1931) came to the aid of a private in their company who had been bitten in the leg by a rattlesnake. The two officers took turns drawing contaminated blood from the wound while arrangements were made to transport the injured soldier ten miles to the base hospital. Wilson and Hanmer were later awarded the Soldier's Medal in 1934 for their part in saving the private's life. Like Wilson, Hanmer also went on to become a general officer in the Corps of Engineers.

Wilson attended the University of California, Berkeley from 1932 to 1933, earning a B.S. degree in civil engineering in May 1933. He then attended the Army Engineer School at Fort Humphreys, Virginia from 1933 to 1934, completing the company officer's course in June 1934. From August 1934 to June 1938, Wilson was an instructor in the Department of Civil and Military Engineering at West Point. He then attended the Command and General Staff School at Fort Leavenworth, Kansas from 1938 to 1939, graduating in June 1939.

Promoted to captain in June 1939, Wilson commanded a company of the 3rd Engineers at Schofield Barracks, Hawaii from July 1939 to February 1941. He returned to the Command and General Staff School from 1941 to 1942, graduating in August 1942. With the onset of World War II, Wilson received temporary promotions to major, lieutenant colonel and then colonel. From December 1942 to May 1943, he commanded the 79th Engineer Combat Regiment at Camp Phillips, Kansas. In 1943, Wilson attended the Army-Navy Staff College, graduating in September 1943.

From 1943 to 1945, Wilson served as Deputy Engineer-in-Chief with the South East Asia Command at New Delhi, India, and Kandy, Ceylon. Receiving a temporary promotion to brigadier general in February 1945, he became Commanding General, Advance Section, U.S. Forces, China Burma India Theater, and Chief of Staff of the Chinese Army in India. Later, he commanded Intermediate and Base Sections and consolidated all three, commanding all ground forces remaining in the theater.

After the war, Wilson was District Engineer in St. Paul, Minnesota (1946–49), and Mobile, Alabama (1949–52), and then South Atlantic (1952–53) and Mediterranean Division Engineer (1953–55).

He assumed command of the 18th Engineer Brigade at Fort Leonard Wood, Missouri, in 1955.

He served as Deputy Chief of Engineers for Construction from 1956 to 1960. Wilson was commanding general of the Army Engineer Center and Fort Belvoir and commandant of the Army Engineer School in 1960–61.

Wilson's military honors included a Distinguished Service Medal, Legion of Merit with Oak Leaf Cluster, a Soldier's Medal and membership in the French Legion of Honor.

Wilson retired as Chief of Engineers on June 30, 1965, and died on December 6, 1985, in Mobile, Alabama. He is buried at Arlington National Cemetery beside his wife and parents.

Wilson was part of a military family. His younger brother John Newton Wilson (1913–1944) was a lieutenant colonel who was killed in the Battle of Normandy. His son Walter King Wilson III (1937–2008) also served in the Engineer Corps and reached the rank of colonel.

The General W.K. Wilson Jr. Bridge on I-65 near Mobile, Alabama was named in his honor.

== Dates of rank ==
| Image | Rank | Temporary | Permanent |
|---|---|---|---|
| | Second Lieutenant | N/A | June 13, 1929 |
| | First Lieutenant | N/A | October 1, 1934 |
| | Captain | N/A | June 13, 1939 |
| | Major | October 16, 1941 | June 19, 1946 |
| | Lieutenant Colonel | May 7, 1942 | July 15, 1948 |
| | Colonel | March 4, 1943 | N/A |
| | Brigadier General | February 13, 1945 | N/A |
| | Colonel | May 16, 1946 | April 17, 1952 |
| | Brigadier General | March 16, 1953 | April 2, 1957 |
| | Major General | March 25, 1957 | June 22, 1959 |
| | Lieutenant General | May 19, 1961 | N/A |

=== Decorations ===

| 1st Row | Army Distinguished Service Medal | | Legion of Merit w/ Oak Leaf Cluster |
| 2nd Row | Soldier's Medal | Army Commendation Medal | American Defense Service Medal with Foreign Service Clasp |
| 3rd Row | American Campaign Medal | Asiatic-Pacific Campaign Medal w/ two Service Stars | European-African-Middle Eastern Campaign Medal |
| 4th Row | World War II Victory Medal | National Defense Service Medal w/ Oak Leaf Cluster | Officer of the Legion of Honor (France) |

Military offices
| Preceded by Emerson C. Itschner | Chief of Engineers; 1961–65 | Succeeded by William F. Cassidy |
