= Harold W. Blakeley =

U.S. Army major general

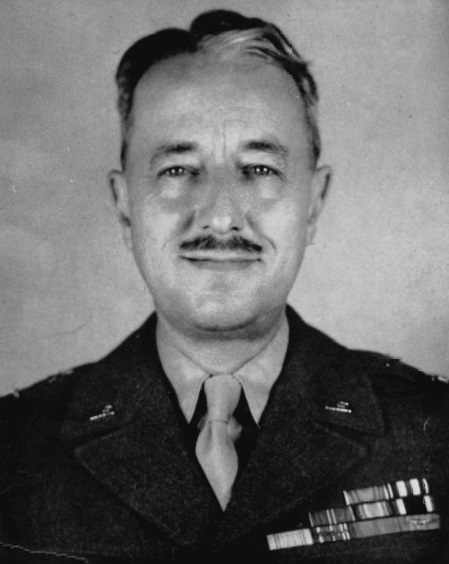
- From 1946's 4th Infantry Division Yearbook
- Born: December 29, 1893; Malden, Massachusetts, U.S.
- Died: May 10, 1966 (aged 72); Bethesda, Maryland, U.S.
- Burial place: Arlington National Cemetery
- Education: Boston University (attended); United States Army Command and General Staff College; United States Army War College
- Spouse(s): Jeanne de La Villeneuve Hyman (m. 1920–1940) Louise de La Villeneuve Hyman Bultman (m. 1941–1966)
- Military career
- Service: United States Army
- Service years: 1917–1946
- Rank: Major General
- Service number: 07237
- Unit: U.S. Army Field Artillery Branch
- Commands: Battery A, 4th Field Artillery Regiment; 6th Field Artillery Regiment; 65th Field Artillery Regiment; 5th Armored Division Artillery; Combat Command A, 5th Armored Division; 4th Infantry Division Artillery; 4th Infantry Division
- Conflicts: World War I World War II; Allied-occupied Germany
- Awards: Silver Star; Legion of Merit; Bronze Star Medal; Legion of Honor (Chevalier) (France); Croix de Guerre with palm (France)

Harold W. Blakeley (December 29, 1893 – May 10, 1966) was a career officer in the United States Army. A veteran of World War I and World War II, he attained the rank of major general. Blakeley's commands included: the 6th Field Artillery Regiment; 5th Armored Division Artillery; Combat Command A, 5th Armored Division; 4th Infantry Division Artillery; and 4th Infantry Division. His awards included the Silver Star, Legion of Merit, and Bronze Star Medal.

A native of Malden, Massachusetts, Blakeley was raised and educated in Salem, Massachusetts. After graduating from Salem High School in 1911, he worked at a bank and attended Boston University from 1915 to 1917. Blakeley attended Citizens' Military Training Camps during the expansion of the U.S. Army in anticipation of entry into World War I. In October 1917, Blakeley successfully applied for a commission as a second lieutenant of Field Artillery. During the First World War, he served with Artillery units that performed security patrols on the Texas-Mexico border.

After World War I, Blakeley continued his army career, including a posting to the Panama Canal Zone. He was a 1936 graduate of the United States Army Command and General Staff College and a 1939 graduate of the United States Army War College. During World War II, he served as commander of: the 6th Field Artillery Regiment, 65th Field Artillery Regiment; 5th Armored Division Artillery; Combat Command A, 5th Armored Division; 4th Infantry Division Artillery; and 4th Infantry Division. He took part in the Normandy landings in June 1944, and led the 4th Infantry Division during combat in Europe until the end of the war.

Blakeley retired in 1946 and resided in Washington, D.C., where he authored a history of the 32nd Infantry Division. He died in Bethesda, Maryland on May 10, 1966, and was buried at Arlington National Cemetery.

== Early life ==
Harold Whittle Blakeley was born in Malden, Massachusetts on December 29, 1893, the son of John Blakeley and Carrie Bemis (Skinner) Blakeley. He was raised and educated in Salem, Massachusetts and was a 1911 graduate of Salem High School. After graduating, Blakeley was employed at a bank in Salem. In 1914, he competed for an appointment to the United States Military Academy from U.S. Representative Augustus P. Gardner and finished third on the competitive examination. From 1915 to 1917, he was a student at Boston University.

In the summers of 1916 and 1917, Blakeley attended the Citizens' Military Training Camps which were held at Plattsburgh Barracks, New York. (Note: Plattsburgh Camps were held as part of the Preparedness Movement which was organized in anticipation of U.S. entry into World War I.) With the army expanding for U.S. entry into World War I, in October 1917, Blakeley's application for a commission was approved, and he was appointed a second lieutenant of Field Artillery.

== Start of career ==
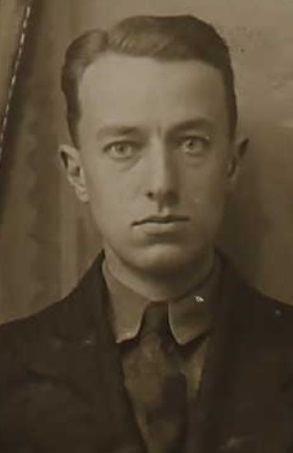
Blakeley's 1919 passport photo

After receiving his commission, Blakeley was assigned to the 77th Field Artillery Regiment. In December 1917, he was transferred to the 4th Field Artillery Regiment, which performed security patrols on the Texas-Mexico border during the First World War. He was promoted to temporary first lieutenant in July 1918 and in August he was assigned to the 1st Field Artillery Regiment at Fort Sill, Oklahoma. In December 1918 he was appointed aide-de-camp to Brigadier General Laurin Leonard Lawson, commander of the 15th Field Artillery Brigade at Camp Stanley, Texas.

In February 1919, he rejoined the 4th Field Artillery at Fort Ethan Allen, Vermont. He was promoted to permanent first lieutenant in July 1919 and captain in July 1920. During 1919 and 1920, he toured First World War battlefields and was assigned as a courier between several European countries, including France, Belgium, Holland, Switzerland, Czechoslovakia, Austria, and Poland. In 1921, Blakeley was posted to Camp Stanley with the 4th Field Artillery when the regiment was transferred from Fort Ethan Allen. When the 4th Field Artillery was assigned to the Panama Canal Zone in the early 1920s, he was appointed to command the regiment's Battery A in Gatún. In 1926, Blakeley graduated from the Battery Officers' Course at the Fort Sill Field Artillery School, after which he remained at the school as an instructor. In 1930, he was assigned to duty with the 16th Field Artillery Regiment at Fort Myer, Virginia.

== Continued career ==
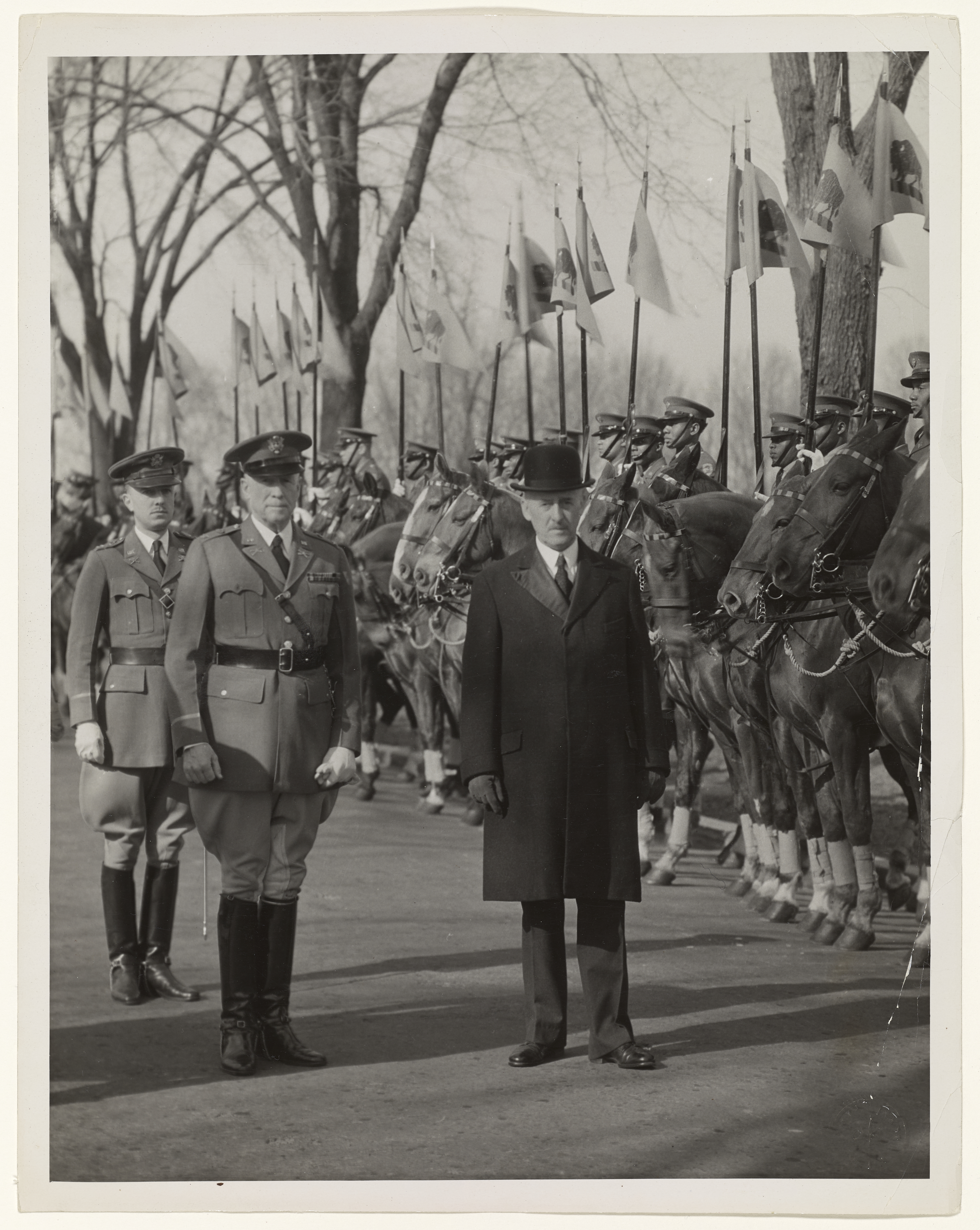
Secretary of State Henry L. Stimson and Colonel Harry N. Cootes review troops at Fort Myer in 1933, Blakeley is behind Cootes and to his right.

A noted horseman, in the 1920s and 1930s he took part in shows and other competitions, and won prizes in the road hack category. In 1934, Blakeley was the army's technical advisor on the film Keep 'Em Rolling, the plot of which revolves around a World War I Field Artillery horse and soldier. In January 1935, Blakeley was selected to attend the United States Army Command and General Staff College, and he was promoted to major in August 1935. He graduated in February 1936 and was assigned to the faculty at the Field Artillery School.

In February 1938, Blakeley was assigned as a student at the United States Army War College. He graduated in April 1939, after which he was assigned to the Command and General Staff College faculty. In June 1940, Blakeley was assigned to Fort Hoyle, Maryland as executive officer of the 6th Field Artillery Regiment. He was promoted to lieutenant colonel in August 1940 and assigned to command of the 6th Field Artillery at Fort Bragg.

== Later career ==
In September 1941, Blakeley was assigned to command of the 65th Field Artillery Regiment at Fort Knox, Kentucky. In December 1941 he was promoted to temporary colonel and assigned to command the 5th Armored Division Artillery during the division's organization and training at Camp Cooke, California. He was promoted to temporary brigadier general in June 1942, and subsequently commanded the 5th Armored Division's Combat Command A.

In August 1943, Blakeley was assigned to command the 4th Infantry Division Artillery, which he led during the division's combat in France. In December 1944, Blakeley was assigned to command the 4th Infantry Division, which he led until the end of the war. In March 1945, he was promoted to temporary major general. He remained in command after the war as the 4th Infantry Division performed duty during Allied-occupied Germany. In the summer of 1945, the 4th Infantry Division returned to the United States to reorganize for combat in the Pacific theater, but the surrender of Japan in September ended the requirement. Blakeley retired in April 1946.

=== Awards ===
Blakeley's U.S. military awards included the Silver Star, Legion of Merit, and Bronze Star Medal. In addition, his foreign awards included the French Legion of Honor (Chevalier) and Croix de Guerre with palm. According to a synopsis of his Silver Citation, Blakeley was recognized for heroism on Utah Beach during the Normandy landings in June 1944: "He landed at Utah Beach on D-Day during a period of intense enemy shell fire ... He proceeded along the shell-swept road at great personal risk ... By his courageous action ... he was materially responsible for the success of the operations."

== Retirement and death ==
In retirement, Blakeley was a resident of Washington, D.C. and contributed several book reviews to the New York Times. He also authored a book, 1957's 32d Infantry Division: World War II. He died in Bethesda, Maryland on May 10, 1966, after he experienced a heart attack while playing at the Kenwood Golf & Country Club. Blakeley was buried at Arlington National Cemetery.

== Family ==
In August 1920, Blakeley married Jeanne de La Villeneuve Hyman of New Orleans. She died in May 1940, and in 1941 he married Louise de La Villeneuve Hyman Bultman, the sister of his first wife. Blakeley had no children with either wife.

== Works by ==
(Partial list)

- "We Must See With Our Own Eyes" (PDF). The Field Artillery Journal. Washington, DC: United States Field Artillery Association. May–June 1939. pp. 215–218.
- "When the Army was Smeared". Combat Forces Journal. Washington, DC: Association of the United States Army. February 1952. pp. 26–29 – via Google Books.
- "Shrapnel, Semantics and Such". Combat Forces Journal. Washington, DC: Association of the United States Army. March 1952. pp. 29–30 – via Google Books.
- Clifton, C. V. Jr.; Blakeley, Harold W. (May 1952). "A Pointer looks at the WPPA and so does a Setter". Combat Forces Journal. Washington, DC: Association of the United States Army. pp. 32–34 – via Google Books.
- "The Guided Mrs". Combat Forces Journal. Washington, DC: Association of the United States Army. April 1953. pp. 26–28 – via Google Books.
- "The Soldier Pays". Combat Forces Journal. Washington, DC: Association of the United States Army. July 1953. pp. 34–35 – via Google Books.
- "D Plus Ten Years". Combat Forces Journal. Washington, DC: Association of the United States Army. July 1954. pp. 23–27 – via Google Books.
- "Esprit De What? Our Army and Morale". Military Review. Fort Leavenworth, KS: United States Army Command and General Staff College. September 1955. pp. 3–7.
- The 32d Infantry Division in World War II. Madison, WI: Thirty Second Infantry Division History Commission. 1957 – via Internet Archive.

== Notes ==
Military offices
Preceded by Raymond O. Barton	Commanding General 4th Infantry Division; 1944–1945	Succeeded by George P. Hays
