= Charles E. Hart =

United States Army general (1900–1991)

Charles Edward Hart
- Circa 1956-1960
- Born: June 17, 1900; Fort Washington, Maryland
- Died: December 9, 1991 (aged 91); Fort Belvoir, Virginia
- Burial place: Arlington National Cemetery
- Military career
- Allegiance: United States
- Branch: United States Army
- Service years: 1924–1960
- Rank: Lieutenant General
- Commands: 1st Infantry Division Artillery; 7th Army Artillery; US Military Assistance Group, Greece; V Corps; United States Army Field Artillery School; Second United States Army; Army Air Defense Command
- Conflicts: World War II
- Awards: Army Distinguished Service Medal (2); Legion of Merit (2)

Charles Edward Hart (June 17, 1900 – December 9, 1991) was an American military officer who served as Commanding General of the V Corps (1954–1956) and Commanding General of the Army Air Defense Command (1957–1960).

== Early life ==
Charles Edward Hart was born in Fort Washington, Maryland, the son of Dr. (Colonel) James William Hart and Grace Duncan Hart. Hart was a descendant of Private Joseph Hart, a member of the 4th Virginia Regiment during the Revolutionary War. By 1910 the family had moved to Washington, D.C. where Hart's father had a general practice and served on the staff of the Veteran's Hospital. Eventually residing in Fort Hunt, Virginia, Hart would attend military drills with his father. After graduating from Western High School in Washington, D.C., Hart began working at a bank while seeking an appointment as a cadet at United States Military Academy.

== Early career ==
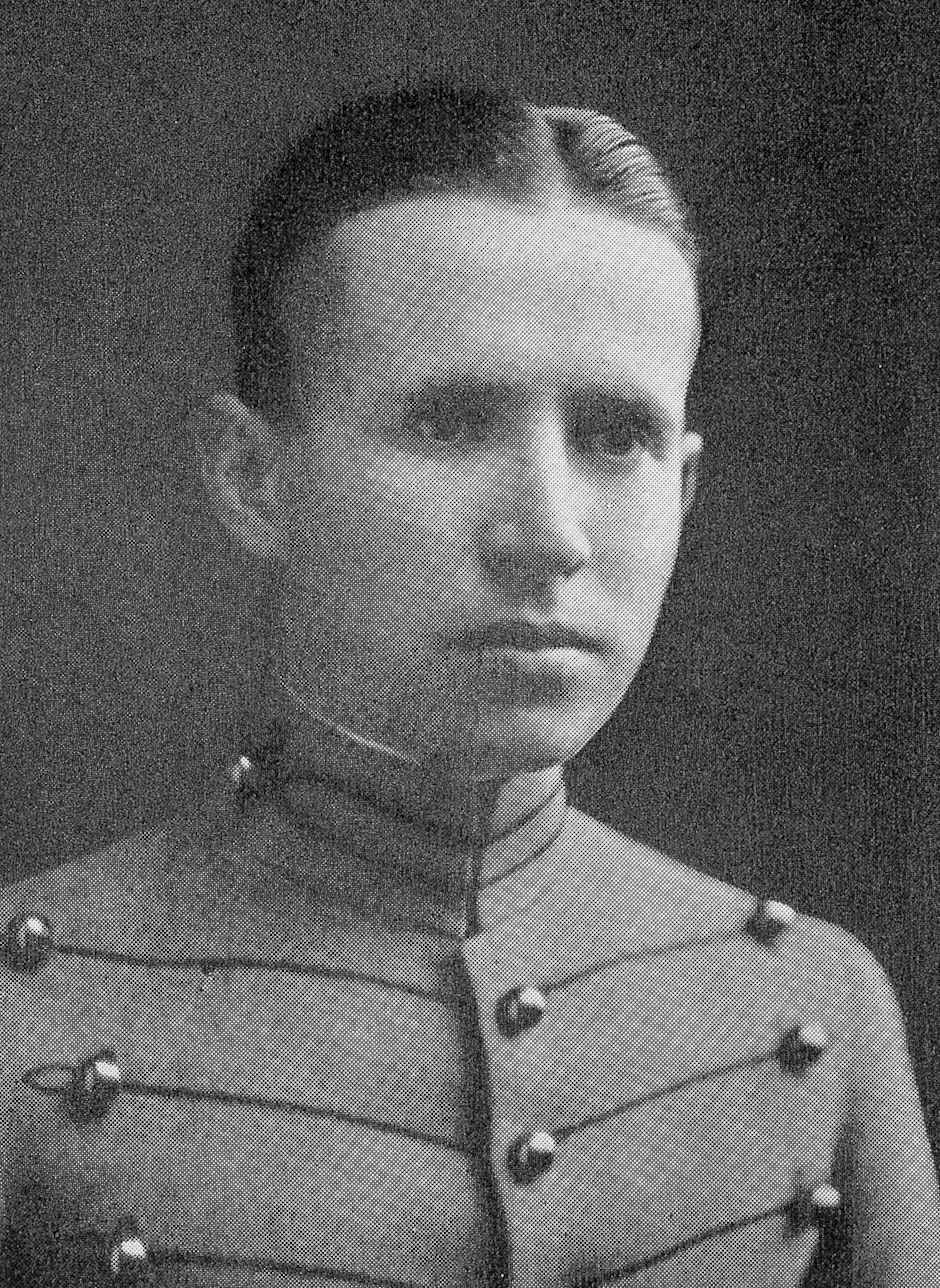
At West Point in 1924

Hart entered the United States Military Academy at West Point on July 1, 1920, during the tenure of Douglas MacArthur as superintendent. He would graduate 298th out of 405 cadets in 1924. While at the Academy Hart was known to be an avid horseman.

Following graduation in 1924, Hart was commissioned a second lieutenant in the Field Artillery, and assigned to the 4th Field Artillery Regiment located at Fort Sam Houston, Texas. Shortly after his arrival in Texas he would be transferred to Fort McIntosh, Texas along the US-Mexican border where he would remain until being transferred to Fort Knox, Kentucky in 1928. During his tenure in Texas he would serve as adjutant for the 4th Field Artillery Regiment before transferring to the 3rd Field Artillery Regiment also based at Fort McIntosh, Texas. Upon transfer he would continue as an adjutant and serve as Commanding Officer of the Service Battery, 3rd Field Artillery Regiment from 1927 until his transfer in 1928.

Hart would serve one year at Fort Knox, Kentucky before receiving a promotion to 1st lieutenant and a transfer to Fort Myer, Virginia to serve with the 16th Field Artillery Regiment. He would remain there for approximately one year before being sent to the United States Army Field Artillery School located in Fort Sill, Oklahoma. After a year as a student, Hart graduated in 1931 and went to the 8th Field Artillery Regiment. In 1932 Hart would serve the 11th Artillery Brigade (1932–1933) until followed by the 8th Artillery Regiment (1933–1934) and 18th Artillery Regiment (1934–1935).

In 1935 Hart would be transferred to the United States Military Academy and receive a promotion to captain. At the academy Hart would command Battery "A" and serve as an artillery instructor. Following his service at the academy he would be transferred to United States Field Artillery School located in Fort Sill, Oklahoma as an instructor in 1940. He would remain at the school until 1942 after the outbreak of World War II.

== World War II ==
On January 31, 1941, Hart received a temporary promotion to the rank of major. Later that year, while serving as an instructor in the Department of Gunnery at the United States Army Field Artillery School, Hart received a permanent promotion to Major on June 12, 1941. He was then sent to Fort Leavenworth, Kansas to attend the Command and General Staff School. Upon completing the course, he was again assigned to the Artillery School, this time as an instructor in the Department of Tactics.

With America's entry into World War II in 1941, the military suffered from a lack of qualified officers to take command positions. It was under these circumstances in 1941 that Hart received a promotion to the temporary rank of Lieutenant Colonel on December 24, 1941. He would then be transferred to the II Corps during the planning for the invasion of North Africa where he would initially serve as the Assistant Commander of the II Corps Artillery. With the commencement of Operation Torch and the invasion of Algiers the II Corps under Major General Lloyd Fredendall would be designated the Central Task Force for the invasion. It was during the operations in North Africa that Hart was elevated to the position of commander of the II Corps Artillery.

On January 12, 1943, Hart was given a temporary commission of colonel and continued in command of the II Corps Artillery. As the II Corps’ Artillery Officer he was involved with the operations of the II Corps during the drive towards Tunis, including the U.S. defeats at the Battle of Sidi Bou Zid on February 14–17, 1943 and Kasserine Pass on February 19–22, 1943. Following the Allied defeats in February, Major General Lloyd Fredendall was transferred from command of the II Corps and replaced by Major General George S. Patton on March 6, 1943.

With Patton in command, Hart moved to improve artillery operations. Concerned with his artillery air observation posts, he requested and received permission to add an air artillery officer to his staff. On March 8, 1943, Lieutenant Delbert L. Bristol was assigned on temporary duty. Under Hart's direction and with the blessing of Patton, Bristol developed the first Corps Air Artillery section in the entire U.S. Army.

Assigned as Artillery Officer for First Army, Hart would be decorated with the Order of Suvorov Second Class at war's end when the U.S. Army linked up with the Red Army on the Elbe River.

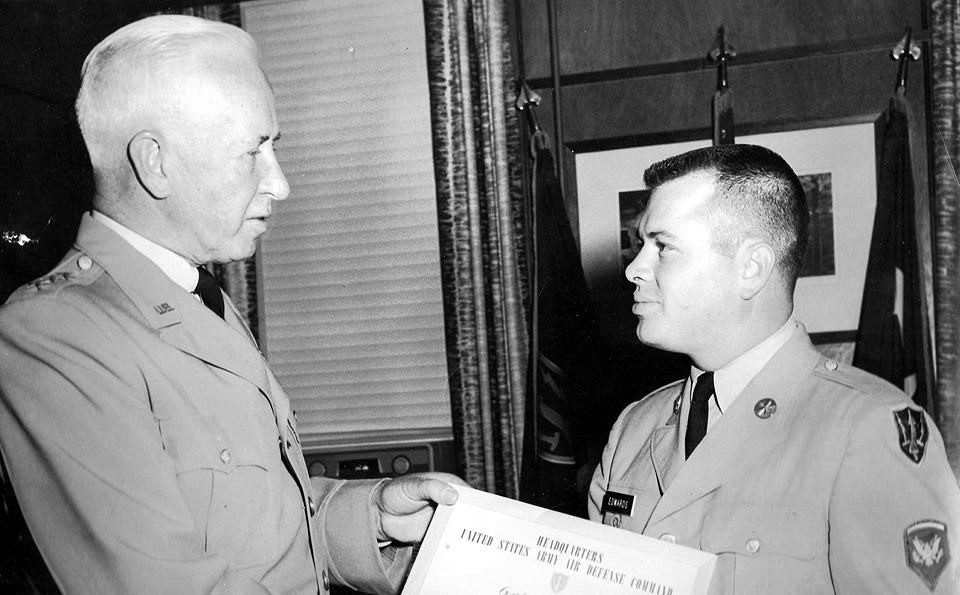
Lt. General Hart (left) presenting award to Specialist Donald B. Edwards at Army Air Defense Command HQ, Ent Air Force Base, Colorado Springs, Colorado, 1960

== Later life ==
Hart retired from active duty on August 1, 1960, and was awarded an oak leaf cluster to the Distinguished Service Medal that he had received after his World War II service.

Hart died at Fort Belvoir, Virginia at the age of 91, and was buried at Arlington National Cemetery.

Military offices
Preceded by Arthur M. Harper	Commandant of the United States Army Field Artillery School; 1953–1954	Succeeded by Edward Thomas Williams
