= Stellato =

Stellato (Italian: starry) is an Italian surname that may refer to:

- Deanna Stellato (born 1983), American figure skater
- Marcello Palingenio Stellato, 16th century Italian author
- Sean P. Stellato (born 1977), American sports agent

== See also ==
- Starry
