= Clift Andrus =

United States Army general

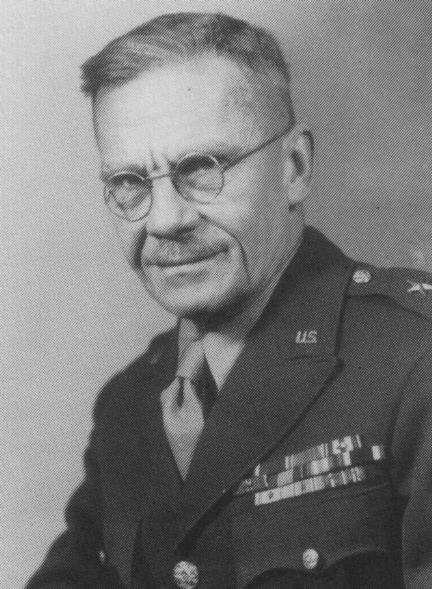
- Major General Clift Andrus during World War II.
- Born: October 12, 1890; Fort Leavenworth, Kansas, U.S.
- Died: September 29, 1968 (aged 77); Washington, D.C., U.S.
- Burial place: Arlington National Cemetery, Virginia, United States
- Military career
- Allegiance: United States
- Branch: United States Army
- Service years: 1912-1952
- Rank: Major General
- Nickname: "Mr Chips"
- Service number: O-3266
- Unit: Field Artillery Branch
- Commands: 1st Infantry Division; United States Army Field Artillery School
- Conflicts: World War I World War II
- Awards: Distinguished Service Cross; Army Distinguished Service Medal; Silver Star (2); Legion of Merit (2); Bronze Star Medal (2)

Major General Clift Andrus (October 12, 1890 – September 29, 1968) was a highly decorated senior officer of the United States Army. He is most noted for his service as a commander of 1st Infantry Division at the end of World War II.

In military circles, Andrus was widely known by his nickname, "Mr. Chips".

== Early years ==
Clift Andrus was born on October 12, 1890, at Fort Leavenworth, Kansas as a son of army colonel, Edwin Proctor Andrus and his wife Marie Josephine (née Birdwell). After attending a Shattuck-Saint Mary's in Faribault, Minnesota, Andrus began to study Civil Engineering at Cornell University as a member of the class of 1912. He left college before graduating, and entered the army in spring of 1912 with a commission as a second lieutenant in the 4th Field Artillery Regiment.

Andrus served at Fort Leavenworth, Kansas and after three months was transferred to Fort Russell in Wyoming.

In 1914 and 1915, Andrus was assigned to the U.S.-Mexico border as part of the patrolling and security activities that preceded the Pancho Villa Expedition.

In 1915, Andrus was assigned to the Army Field Artillery School at Fort Sill for additional training. He remained at Fort Sill as an instructor throughout World War I.

His post-war assignments included service in Trier with the Army of Occupation stationed in Germany following the Armistice, staff duty with the office of the Chief of Field Artillery, and observer and instructor with several units of the National Guard.

Andrus graduated from the Field Artillery Advanced Course in 1928, the United States Army Command and General Staff College in 1930, the United States Army War College in 1934, and the Naval War College in 1935.

== Second World War ==
At the beginning of the World War II, Colonel Andrus was commander of the 24th Infantry Division Artillery at Schofield Barracks, Hawaii. In May 1942 he was promoted to brigadier general. Subsequently, he was transferred to the 1st Infantry Division under command of Terry de la Mesa Allen Sr., as commander of the Division Artillery.

Andrus participated with the 1st Infantry Division in several battles of the North African Campaign and was subsequently awarded the Distinguished Service Cross, Silver Star and other awards.

== Life after War ==
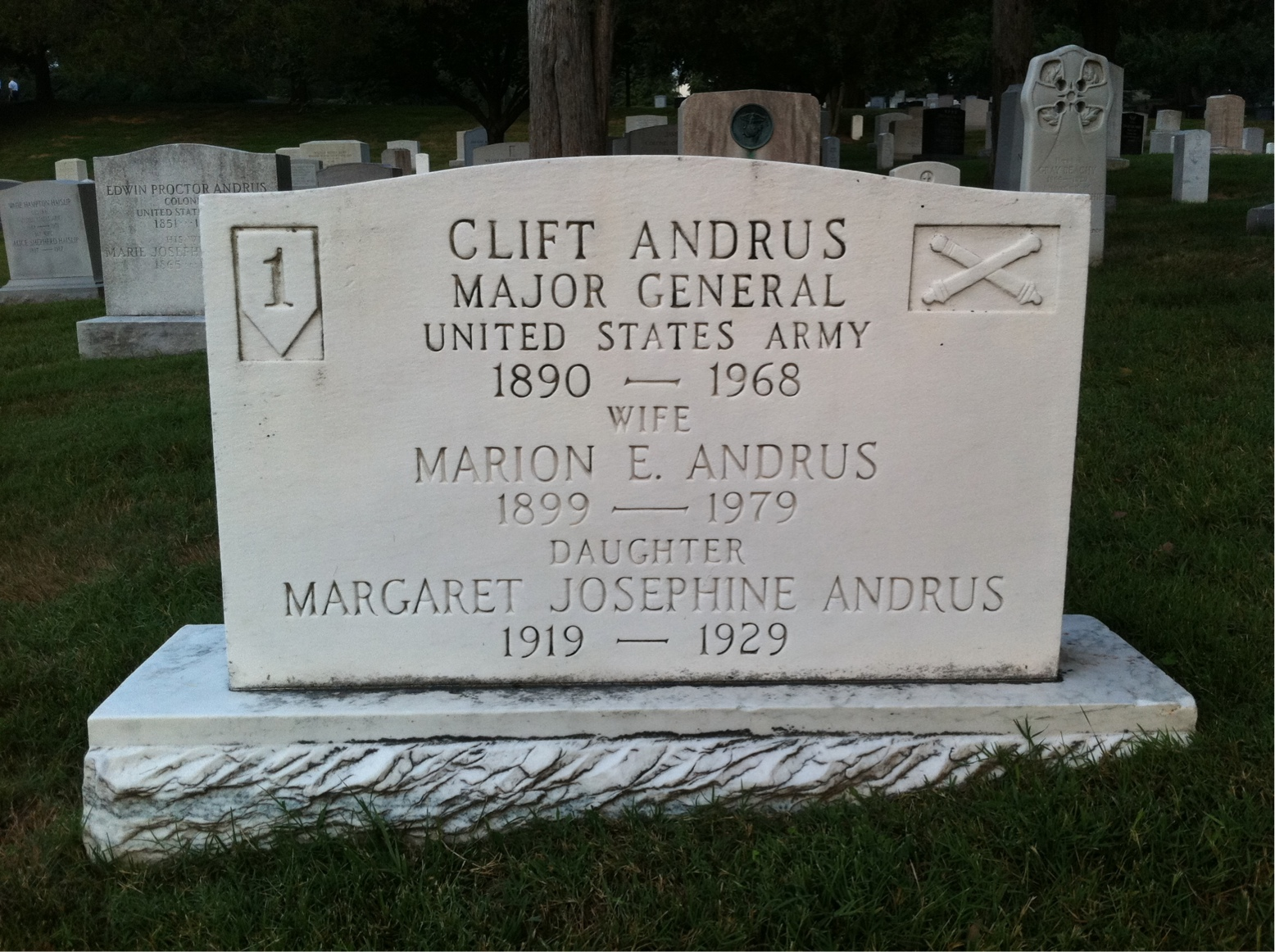
The grave of Major General Clift Andrus at Arlington National Cemetery.

In June 1946, Andrus was transferred to Fort Sill, Oklahoma, where he was appointed commander of the Field Artillery School. Andrus served until April 1949, when he was transferred to the General Staff in Washington, D.C., where he became Director of the Organization & Training Division.

His last assignment was at Fort Meade, Maryland, where he was appointed deputy commander of the Second United States Army under command of Edward H. Brooks.

In 1951, Andrus received the honorary degree of Doctor of Science from Drexel University in 1951. Andrus retired from the Army on October 31, 1952.

Andrus died in Washington, D.C., on September 29, 1968, at the age of 77. He was buried at Arlington National Cemetery.

== Family ==
He married Marion Eleanor Lightfoot on February 15, 1918. They had two daughters: Margaret Josephine and Marion.

== Summary of Military Career ==
=== Decorations ===
Major General Clift Andrus received numerous military decorations for bravery or distinguished service. Here is his ribbon bar:

1st Row	Distinguished Service Cross			
2nd Row	Army Distinguished Service Medal	Silver Star with Oak Leaf Cluster	Legion of Merit with Oak Leaf Cluster	Soldier's Medal
3rd Row	Bronze Star Medal with Oak Leaf Cluster	World War I Victory Medal	Army of Occupation of Germany Medal	American Defense Service Medal with Base Clasp
4th Row	American Campaign Medal	Asiatic-Pacific Campaign Medal with one service star	European-African-Middle Eastern Campaign Medal with eight service stars and Arrowhead device	World War II Victory Medal
5th Row	Army of Occupation Medal	National Defense Service Medal	Chevalier of the Legion of Honor (France)	French Croix de guerre 1939-1945 with Palm
6th Row	Belgian Croix de Guerre with Palm	Czechoslovak Order of the White Lion, 3rd Class	Czechoslovak War Cross 1939-1945	Order of the Patriotic War Second Class (Union of Soviet Socialist Republics)

=== Distinguished Service Cross Citation ===
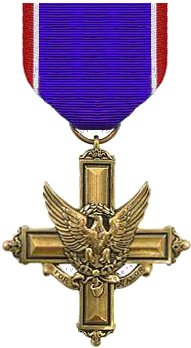

The President of the United States of America, authorized by Act of Congress July 9, 1918, takes pleasure in presenting the Distinguished Service Cross to Brigadier General Clift Andrus (ASN: 0-3266), United States Army, for extraordinary heroism in connection with military operations against an armed enemy while serving with an Artillery Battalion of the 1st Infantry Division, in action against enemy forces in July 1943. Brigadier General Andrus' intrepid actions, personal bravery and zealous devotion to duty exemplify the highest traditions of the military forces of the United States and reflect great credit upon himself, the 1st Infantry Division, and the United States Army.

=== Army Distinguished Service Medal Citation ===
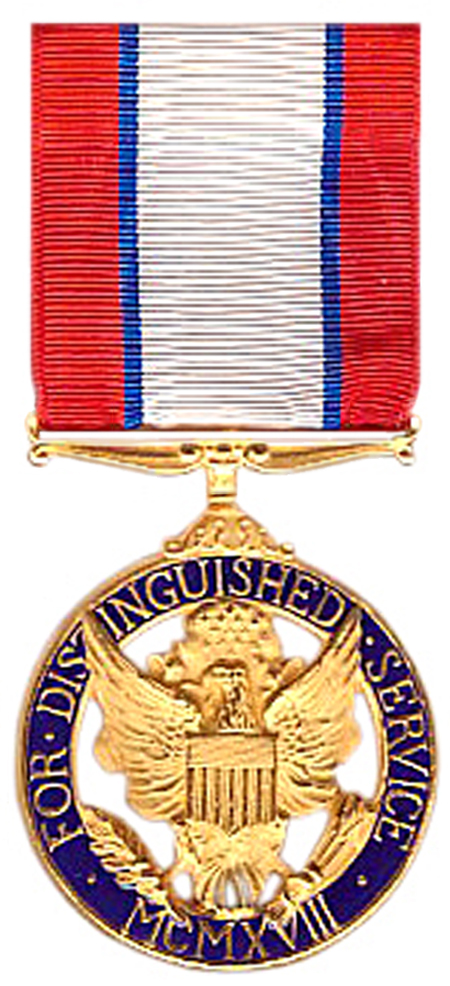

The President of the United States of America, authorized by Act of Congress July 9, 1918, takes pleasure in presenting the Army Distinguished Service Medal to Major General Clift Andrus (ASN: 0-3266), United States Army, for exceptionally meritorious and distinguished services to the Government of the United States, in a duty of great responsibility, during the period from 8 March to 27 April 1945.

=== Silver Star Citation ===
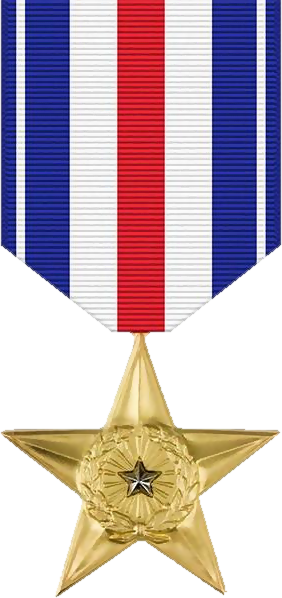

The President of the United States of America, authorized by Act of Congress July 9, 1918, takes pleasure in presenting the Silver Star to Brigadier General Clift Andrus (ASN: 0-3266), United States Army, for gallantry in action while serving with the 1st Infantry Division. An enemy breakthrough occurred where units, prepared to defend and counterattack in force, had been placed. When the breakthrough occurred, enemy infantry elements overran two batteries of an artillery battalion. General Andrus, at grave danger to his life, personally assisted in reorganization of various elements of his artillery battalion and so skillfully disposed adjoining artillery elements that this enemy attack was completely broken down.

=== Soldier's Medal Citation ===
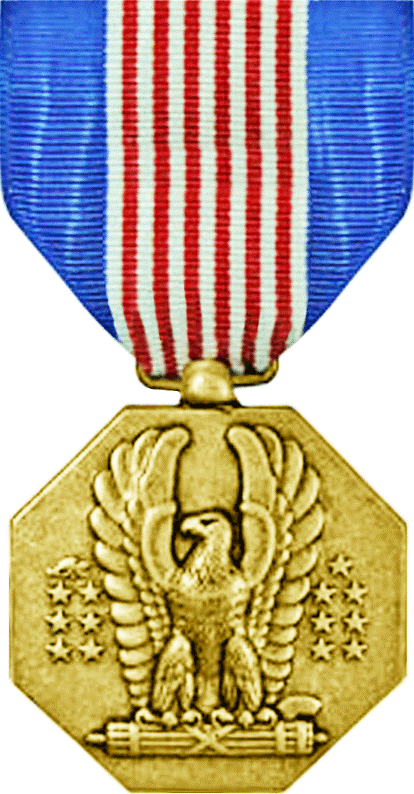

The President of the United States of America, authorized by Act of Congress, July 2, 1926, takes pleasure in presenting the Soldier's Medal to Major (Field Artillery) Clift Andrus (ASN: 0-3266), United States Army, for heroism, not involving actual conflict with an enemy, displayed while serving with the 13th Field Artillery, in rescuing Private First Class Alexander J. Kaye, Service Battery, from drowning at Mokuleia, Oahu Territory of Hawaii on the evening of 21 April 1933. When the boat in which they were riding capsized on a surf-swept coral reef, Private Kaye who was unable to swim ashore clung to the overturned boat while his companion swam ashore to summon aid. In response to the call for help Major Andrus and three companions, at great risk of their lives, went to the rescue in two small rowboats. In the darkness and heavy surf both boats were swamped and the rescue party swept out to sea making their way back with difficulty. Nevertheless, they persisted in their efforts of rescue and, after several hours of perilous effort working in darkness and rough sea, succeeded in getting a line to the capsized boat and bringing Private Kaye safely to shore.

=== Dates of rank ===
Second lieutenant, Regular Army: April 24, 1912
First lieutenant, Regular Army: July 1, 1916
Captain, Regular Army: May 15, 1917
Major, National Army: July 3, 1918
Lieutenant colonel, National Army: October 24, 1918
Major, Regular Army: July 1, 1920
Lieutenant colonel, Regular Army: August 1, 1935
Colonel, National Army: October 16, 1940
Colonel, Regular Army: September 1, 1941
Brigadier general, Army of the United States: May 22, 1942
Major general, Army of the United States: March 17, 1945
Major general, Regular Army: January 24, 1948

Military offices
Preceded by Clarence R. Huebner	Commanding General 1st Infantry Division; 1944–1946	Succeeded by Frank W. Milburn
Preceded by Louis E. Hibbs	Commandant of the United States Army Field Artillery School; 1946–1949	Succeeded by Joseph M. Swing
