= Donald Keith =

Donald Keith may refer to:

- Donald Keith (author), a pseudonym for authors Donald and Keith Monroe
- Donald Keith (actor) (1903–1969), American silent film actor
- Donald R. Keith (1927–2004), American Army general
