= Joseph May Swing =

US Army general (1894–1984)

Joe Swing
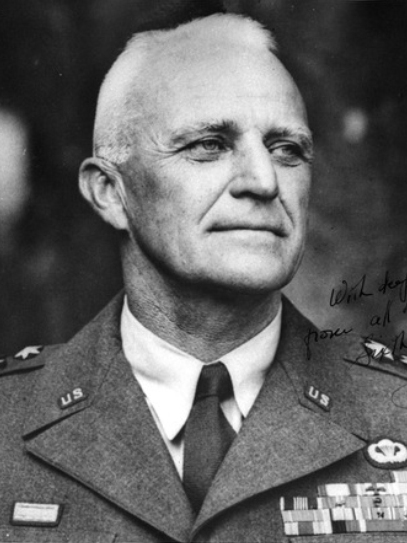

Commissioner of the Immigration and Naturalization Service
- In office May 24, 1954 – January 5, 1962
- President: Dwight Eisenhower; John F. Kennedy
- Preceded by: Argyle Mackey
- Succeeded by: Raymond Farrell

Personal details
- Born: Joseph May Swing; February 28, 1894 Jersey City, New Jersey, U.S.
- Died: December 9, 1984 (aged 90) San Francisco, California, U.S.
- Resting place: Arlington National Cemetery
- Education: United States Military Academy (BS)
- Nickname: "Jumpin' Joe"

Military service
- Allegiance: United States
- Branch/service: United States Army
- Years of service: 1915–1954
- Rank: Lieutenant General
- Unit: Field Artillery Branch
- Commands: Sixth United States Army; United States Army War College; United States Army Field Artillery School; I Corps; 11th Airborne Division
- Battles/wars: Border War; World War I; World War II; Italian campaign; Philippines campaign; Occupation of Japan; Korean War
- Awards: Distinguished Service Cross; Army Distinguished Service Medal; Silver Star (3); Legion of Merit; Bronze Star Medal (3); Air Medal (2)

Joseph May Swing (February 28, 1894 – December 9, 1984) was a senior United States Army officer, who fought in World War I and commanded the 11th Airborne Division during the campaign to liberate the Philippines in World War II.

== Early life and military career ==
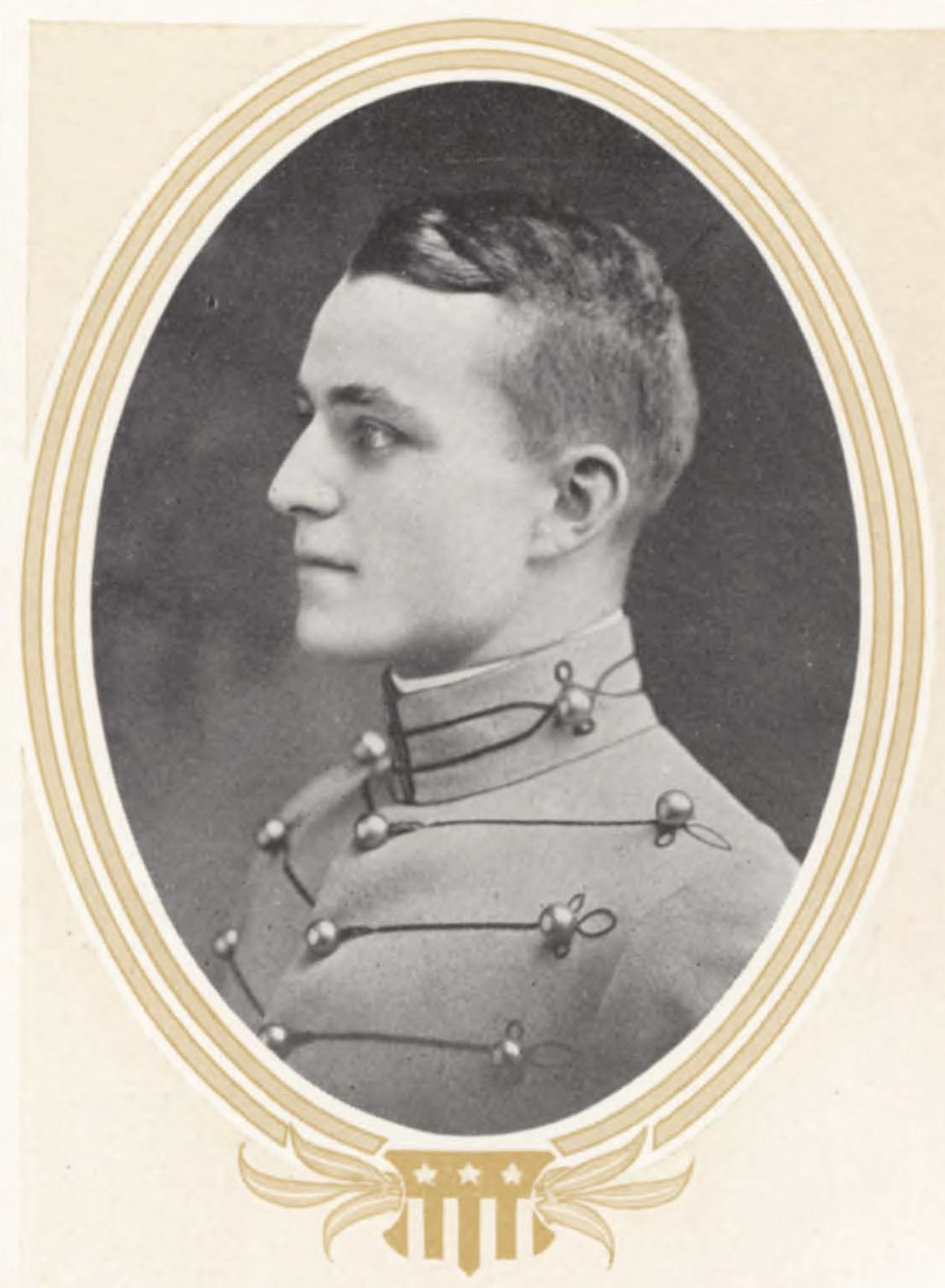
At West Point in 1915

Joseph May Swing was born in Jersey City, New Jersey, on February 28, 1894, the son of Mary Ann (née Snellgrove) and Joseph Swing. He attended the United States Military Academy (USMA) at West Point, New York and was commissioned as an additional second lieutenant upon graduation in June 1915 (see the class the stars fell on). Having been assigned to the Field Artillery Branch of the United States Army, from September 1915 onwards he served with the 4th Field Artillery Regiment at Texas City, Texas, which soon moved to El Paso, later moving to Columbus, New Mexico in March 1916. Swing served with Brigadier General John J. Pershing's Punitive Expedition in the hunt for Pancho Villa, during which he was promoted to second lieutenant on May 8 and then promoted again to first lieutenant on July 1, until July when he moved with his regiment to Fort Bliss, Texas. He remained here until October when he was transferred to the 8th Field Artillery Regiment at Fort Myer, Virginia, with whom he served until May 1917, a month after the American entry into World War I.

He was promoted to captain on the 15th of that month and, in June, after being assigned as aide-de-camp to Brigadier General Peyton C. March, a position he would hold for the rest of the war, both men embarked for service in France. Swing, promoted to the temporary rank of major on March 5, 1918, was to serve in France until later in the month when March, now a major general, was recalled to Washington, D.C. to become the new army chief of staff.

He married General March's daughter, Josephine, on July 8, 1918.

== Between the wars ==
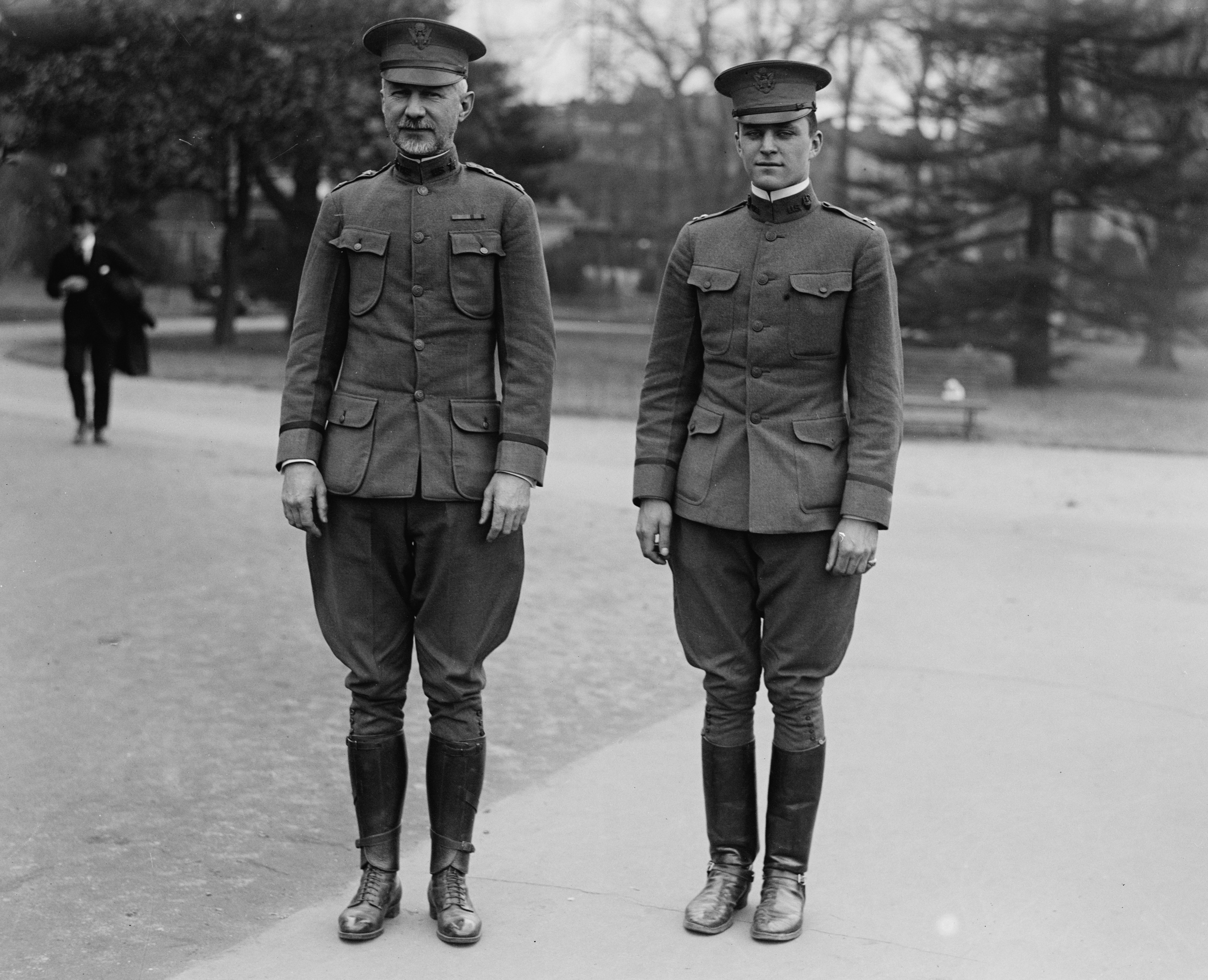
General Peyton C. March, Chief of Staff of the U.S. Army, and his aide-de-camp, Joseph M. Swing.

After the war, Swing continued his career in the artillery, graduating with honors from the United States Army Field Artillery School at Fort Sill, Oklahoma. In 1927 he graduated from the Command and General Staff School at Fort Leavenworth, Kansas, and in 1935 he graduated from the United States Army War College in Washington D.C. On June 24, 1936 he was promoted to lieutenant colonel. From 1938 to 1940 he served as chief of staff for the 2nd Infantry Division, then as commander of artillery for the 1st Cavalry Division. On June 26, 1941 he was promoted to colonel in the Army of the United States (AUS).

== World War II ==
Swing was promoted to brigadier general (AUS) on February 16, 1942 and organized the division artillery of the 82nd Infantry Division, shortly before their conversion to an airborne division.

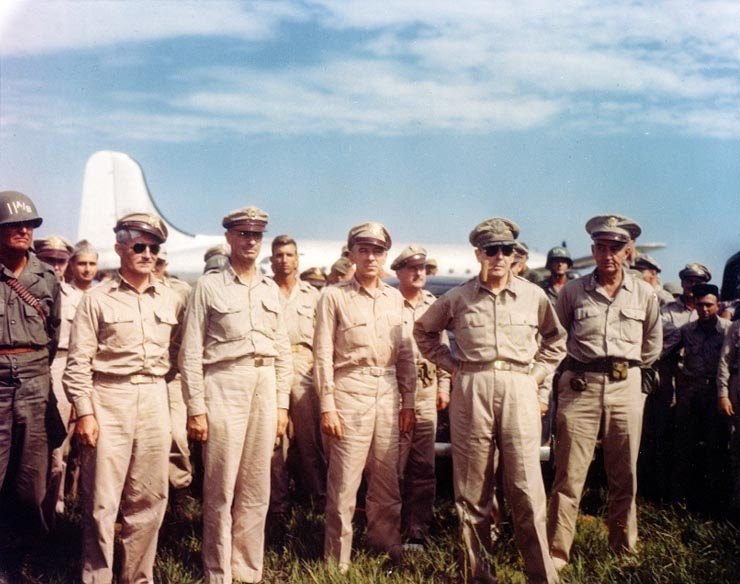
General Douglas MacArthur, (second from the right), upon his arrival at Atsugi airdrome, near Tokyo, Japan, 30 August 1945. General Robert L. Eichelberger (right); Major General Joseph Swing (far left, wearing helmet).

After being promoted to the temporary rank of major general, on February 15, 1943 Swing activated the newly formed 11th Airborne Division at Camp Mackall, North Carolina. He was then sent to the Mediterranean Theater of Operations (MTO) to assist with planning the airborne operations conducted during Operation Husky, the invasion of Sicily. His permanent rank was upgraded from lieutenant colonel to colonel on August 1, 1943.

After returning to the United States, he continued to oversee the training of the 11th Airborne Division, leading them to a successful victory in the Knollwood training maneuver on December 7, 1943. The performance of Swing and the 11th Airborne is credited with saving the concept of the airborne division.

Swing and the officers and men of the 11th Airborne Division shipped out for the Southwest Pacific in May 1944. He would lead the division for the duration of the war, from the invasion of the Philippines to the occupation of Japan. Swing and the 11th Airborne Division greeted General Douglas MacArthur upon his arrival in Japan at Atsugi Airdrome on August 30, 1945.

Swing emerged from the war with several decorations, the highest of which was the Distinguished Service Cross, awarded for his outstanding bravery in mid-April 1945. The citation for the medal reads:

The President of the United States of America, authorized by Act of Congress, July 9, 1918, takes pleasure in presenting the Distinguished Service Cross to Major General Joseph May Swing (ASN: 0-3801), United States Army, for extraordinary heroism in connection with military operations against an armed enemy while serving as Commanding General, 11th Airborne Division, in action against enemy forces from 15 to 17 April 1945, at Luzon, Philippine Islands. Major General Swing displayed superior tactical knowledge and inspiring leadership while personally leading repeated attacks against the strong Japanese defense position at Mt. Macolod, Batangas, Luzon. He flew many dangerous flights in liaison airplanes at low altitudes over the heavily defended ridges in order to make a thorough estimate of the enemy positions and of the terrain. Despite the protest of subordinates, he personally, and on foot, led tank destroyers forward through intense enemy machine-gun and mortar fire to place them in more advantageous positions, and directed their fire so effectively that the enemy-held ridge was taken without further delay. He then moved to the south flank where he found the front lines stalemated and weapons unmanned because of heavy enemy fire. With heroic disregard for his personal safety, General Swing strode fearlessly between tanks and machine guns, calling upon his troops to man their weapons and attack. Inspired by his fearlessness and heroic action, the troops attacked, silenced the Japanese fire, and seized and held the main enemy positions. Through his inspiring courage and valiant leadership, General Swing made a distinguished contribution to the liberation of the Philippine Islands. His gallant leadership, personal bravery and zealous devotion to duty exemplify the highest traditions of the military forces of the United States and reflect great credit upon himself, the 11th Airborne Division, and the United States Army.

== Postwar ==
Swing commanded the 11th Airborne Division, during which time his permanent rank became brigadier general on June 16, 1947, until 1948 when he was assigned command of I Corps in Kyoto, Japan. On January 24, 1948 his permanent rank was upgraded to major general. This was followed by a stint as commandant of the Field Artillery School at Fort Sill, then as commandant of the Army War College at Carlisle Barracks, Pennsylvania. His final posting was as commander of the Sixth Army in San Francisco in 1951. Swing retired from active duty on February 28, 1954, retiring with the rank of lieutenant general.

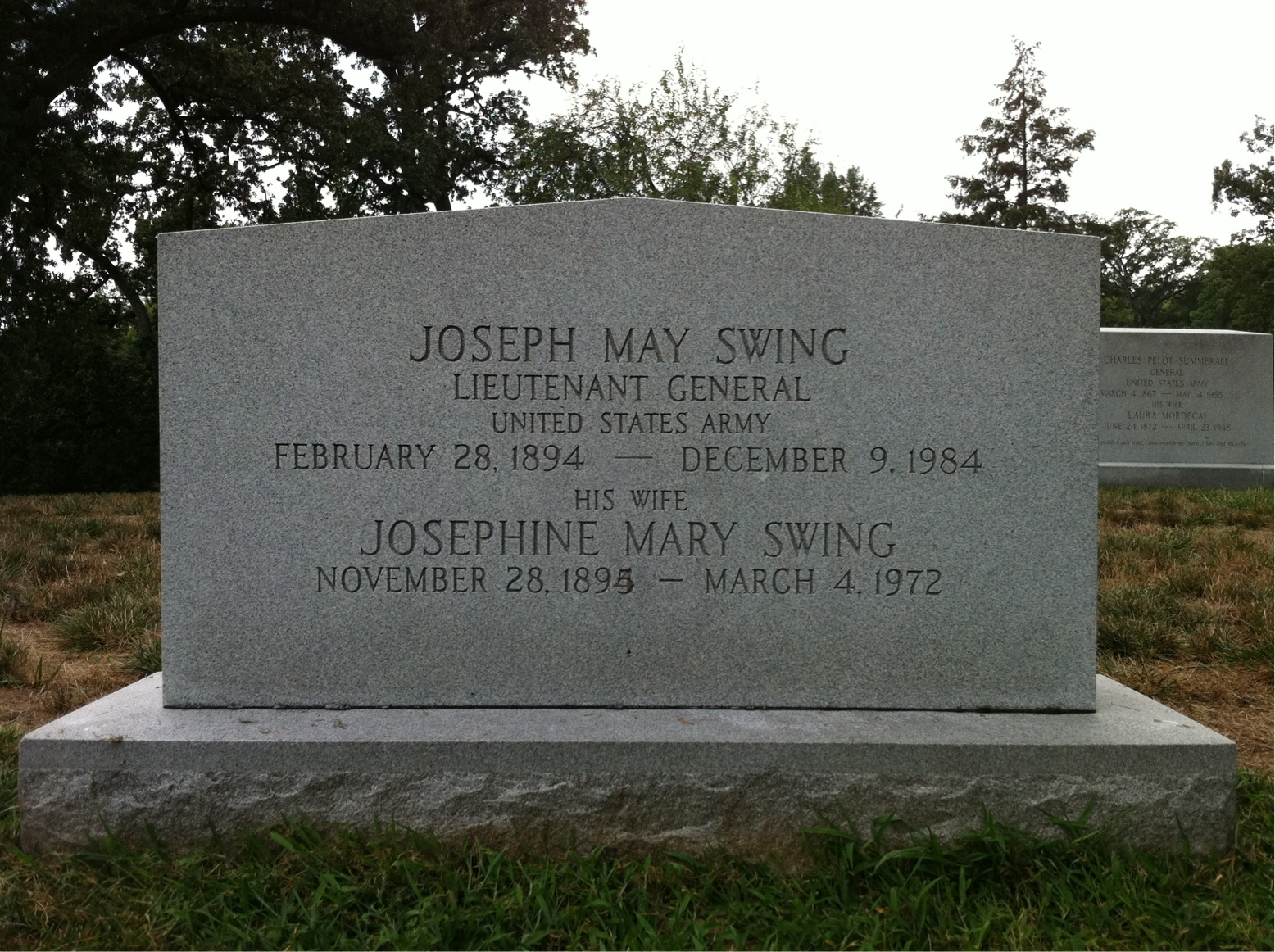
The grave of Lieutenant General Joseph May Swing at Arlington National Cemetery

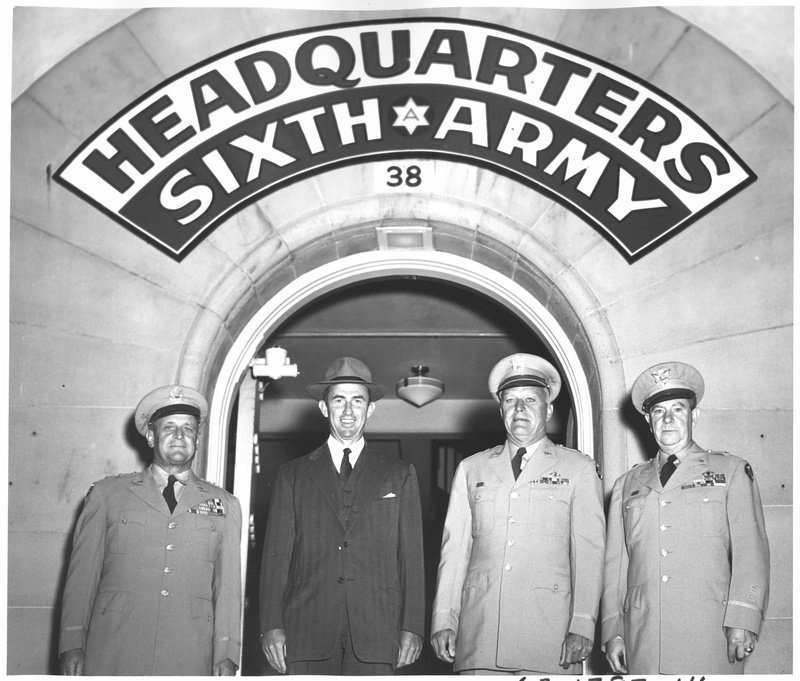
(Left to right): General Milton B. Halsey, Secretary of Army Frank Pace, Lieutenant General Joseph M. Swing, and Brigadier General William T. Sexton stand in front of the Sixth Army Headquarters on September 16, 1952.

After leaving the army, his friend and West Point classmate President Dwight D. Eisenhower nominated him as the Commissioner of Immigration and Naturalization. Following confirmation, Swing served as the head of the INS from 1954 to 1962. Among the programs he implemented was the controversial Operation Wetback (1954), designed to slow the number of illegal border crossings from Mexico.

Swing died in San Francisco at the age of 90 on December 9, 1984, and is buried at Arlington National Cemetery, in Arlington, Virginia, together with his wife, Josephine Mary Swing (1895–1972).

== Decorations ==
- Parachutist Badge
- Distinguished Service Cross
- Army Distinguished Service Medal
- Silver Star with two oak leaf clusters
- Legion of Merit
- Bronze Star Medal with two oak leaf clusters
- Air Medal with oak leaf cluster

== Bibliography ==
- Huston, James A. (1998). Out Of The Blue: U.S Army Airborne Operations In World War II. Purdue University Press. ISBN 1-55753-148-X.

Military offices
New office	Commanding General of the 11th Airborne Division; 1943–1946	Succeeded by William M. Miley
Preceded by Roscoe B. Woodruff	Commanding General of the I Corps; 1948–1949	Succeeded by John B. Coulter
Preceded by Clift Andrus	Commandant of the Army Field Artillery School; 1949–1950	Succeeded by Arthur M. Harper
Vacant Title last held by Philip B. Peyton; 1940	Commandant of the Army War College; 1950–1951	Succeeded by Edward Almond
Preceded by Albert Wedemeyer	Commanding General Sixth Army; 1951–1954	Succeeded by Willard G. Wyman
Political offices
Preceded by Argyle Mackey	Commissioner of the Immigration and Naturalization Service; 1954–1962	Succeeded by Raymond Farrell
