= Salem High School (Massachusetts) =

Location
- 77 Willson Street; Salem, Massachusetts 01970; United States; 42°30′22.9″N 70°54′42.1″W

Information
- Type: Public high school
- School district: Salem Public Schools
- Superintendent: Stephen Zrike
- Principal: Glenn Burns
- Staff: 100.31 (FTE)
- Grades: 9–12
- Student to teacher ratio: 9.45
- Hours in school day: 7:45 AM – 2:35 PM (EDT)
- Campus: Urban
- Colors: Red, white & black
- Song: "To Salem High"
- Athletics conference: Northeastern Conference (NEC)
- Mascot: Witch
- Rival: Beverly, Swampscott, Marblehead, Gloucester, and Danvers
- Newspaper: Witches' Brew
- Website: Homepage

Student demographics (2023–24)
1. Hispanic (49.7%)
2. White (34.7%)
3. African American (8.20%)
4. Multi-race, non-Hispanic (4.00%)
5. Asian (3.10%)
6. Native Hawaiian, Pacific Islander (0.20%)
7. Native American (0.10%)

Salem High School is a four-year public high school in Salem, Massachusetts, United States. It had an enrollment of approximately 900 students (as of 2016), and is accredited by the Massachusetts Department of Education and the New England Association of Schools and Colleges.

== Student life and demographics ==
The Student Council is made up of students and two faculty advisers who work with the administration to solve students' issues.

In addition to academics, students have access to a variety of clubs and organizations. These include the National Honor Society and the Tri-M Music Honor Society, to which students can apply during their junior or senior year, along with the National Art Honor Society and Spanish Honor Society, to which students can apply during their sophomore year.

The school also offers a music department, with programs such as marching band, which is commonly known as "The Pride Of The North Shore", and "Witch Pitch?", an a capella group that has been active for over a decade.

Salem High School is a member of the Junior Reserve Officers' Training Corps (JROTC). "The effects of a Marine Corps JROTC unit extend far beyond the classroom and into the community in developing character, leadership, and civic responsibility. The program makes a difference by keeping kids in school, providing an environment conducive to their personal development and growth, and helping them become productive members of the community."

As of 2016, Mandarin and Arabic were removed from the school's curriculum, although Spanish, French and Latin are still available as language courses.

== Athletics ==
Salem High School is a member of the Massachusetts Interscholastic Athletic Association (District A), in which it is part of the Northeastern Conference. Athletics are open to all students during fall, winter, and spring seasons.

- Fall sports
  - Cross country
  - Football
  - Girls' volleyball
  - Girls' field hockey
  - Boys' soccer
  - Girls' soccer
  - Golf
  - Football cheerleading
  - Unified basketball
- Winter sports
  - Boys' basketball
  - Girls' basketball
  - Boys' indoor track
  - Girls' indoor track
  - Swimming
  - Gymnastics
  - Hockey
  - Wrestling
  - Hockey cheerleading
  - Basketball cheerleading
  - Unified strength and conditioning
- Spring sports
  - Baseball
  - Softball
  - Boys' lacrosse
  - Girls' lacrosse
  - Boys' spring track
  - Girls' spring track
  - Boys' tennis
  - Girls' tennis
  - Boys' volleyball
  - Unified track and field

== 2013 renovation of Bertram Field ==
Bertram Field stands in 1988, condemned as unsafe

The city council in Salem approved a $1,900,000 renovation of the existing Bertram Field, which is named after Salem Hospital captain John Bertram.

Over the summer of 2013, there was a complete renovation of the entire Bertram Field complex. Construction crews installed a new artificial turf field, a track for running, a scoreboard, and a flagpole. This was an important investment because the field is used by the Salem High School athletics program, in addition to various youth sports programs across from the City of Salem.

== Notable graduates ==
- Harold W. Blakeley (1893–1966), U.S. Army major general
- Rick Brunson (born 1972), New York Knicks assistant coach and nine-year NBA veteran
- Cheryl Cohen-Greene (born 1944), sex surrogate, subject of the film The Sessions
- Gardner Dozois (1947–2018), writer
- Jeff Juden (born 1971), Major League Baseball pitcher for the Astros and Indians
- John D. Keenan (born 1965), U.S. state representative for the 7th Essex District in Massachusetts and president of Salem State University
- Eugene Lacritz (1929–2012), conductor, clarinetist, and specialty retail executive in Texas
- Wayne Millner (1913–1976), NFL player
- Scoonie Penn (born 1977), college basketball player at Boston College and Ohio State University, drafted 57th overall by the Atlanta Hawks in the 2000 NBA draft
- Al Ruscio (1924–2013), actor
- Sean P. Stellato (born 1978), AF2 player with the Florida Firecats, Louisville Fire, and Memphis Xplorers; author, motivational speaker, and sports agent representing several NFL players
- John F. Tierney (born 1951), U.S. state representative for the 6th Essex District in Massachusetts
- Jack Welch (1935–2020), chairman and CEO of General Electric
- Cy Wentworth (1904–1986), NFL player
- Ed Wineapple (1905–1996), professional baseball player
- Samuel Zoll (1934–2011), mayor of Salem and chief justice of Massachusetts District Court
