= Arthur M. Harper =

United States Army general (1893–1972)

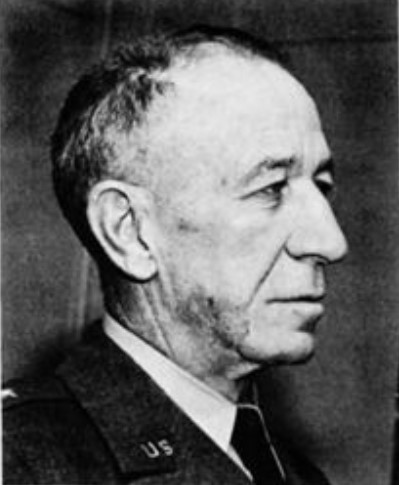
- Born: 23 December 1893; Minneapolis, Minnesota
- Died: 23 February 1972 (aged 78); Saint Petersburg, Florida
- Burial place: Enderlin, North Dakota
- Military career
- Allegiance: United States
- Branch: Cavalry Branch; Field Artillery
- Service years: 1917–1953
- Rank: Major General
- Commands: 60th Field Artillery Battalion; I Corps Artillery; 30th Infantry Division Artillery; III Corps Artillery; XXIV Corps Artillery; 98th Infantry Division; Field Artillery School
- Conflicts: Mexican Border War; World War II; Mariana Islands campaign; Battle of Saipan; Battle of Tinian; Occupation of Japan; Greek Civil War
- Awards: Legion of Merit (3); Bronze Star; Commendation Ribbon; Grand Commander of the Order of the Phoenix (Greece)

Arthur McKinley Harper (23 December 1893 – 23 February 1972) was a United States Army general. During World War II he commanded the XXIV Corps Artillery in the Battle of Saipan and Battle of Tinian during the Mariana Islands campaign. After the war he served as deputy commander of the American Mission to Greece during the Greek Civil War and as commandant of the United States Army Field Artillery School at Fort Sill.

== Early life and career ==
Arthur McKinley Harper was born in Minneapolis, Minnesota, on 23 December 1893, the sixth and youngest son of Christopher and Jane Harper. He entered the United States Military Academy (USMA) at West Point, New York, on 14 June 1913. Due to the American entry into World War I in April 1917, his class graduated early on 20 April. Harper was ranked 83rd in his class of 139, which included future four-star generals J. Lawton Collins, Matthew Ridgway, and Mark W. Clark, along with future lieutenant generals Daniel Noce and William Kelly Harrison Jr..

Harper was commissioned as a second lieutenant in the Cavalry Branch of the United States Army. His first assignment was with the 5th Cavalry Regiment, which was stationed at Camp Stewart, Texas, guarding the border with Mexico. He was promoted to first lieutenant on 15 May 1917 and temporary captain on 5 August. The 5th Cavalry moved to Fort Bliss, Texas, in September 1917, and then Fort Hancock, Texas, in April 1919, by which time the war was over, without Harper's having gotten overseas. He was promoted to the substantive rank of captain on 5 May 1920.

== Between the wars ==
On 1 July 1920, Harper transferred to the Field Artillery Branch. He served with the 82nd Field Artillery at Fort Bliss until 1 June 1921, and then with the 4th Field Artillery Battalion Camp Gatun in the Panama Canal Zone from until 1 June 1924. He attended the Field Artillery School at Fort Sill, Oklahoma, from 10 September 1924 to 10 June 1925. He then served with the Reserve Officers Training Corps (ROTC) in Ames, Iowa, from 12 June 1925 until 1 September 1929, when he returned to troop duty with the 15th Field Artillery at Fort Sam Houston, Texas.

He was promoted to major on 1 November 1932, and attended the United States Army Command and General Staff College at Fort Leavenworth, Kansas, from 1 September 1934 to 10 June 1936. He then served with the ROTC at Xavier University in Cincinnati, Ohio, where he was promoted to lieutenant colonel on 1 July 1940.

== World War II ==
Harper assumed command of the newly-formed 60th Field Artillery at Fort Bragg, North Carolina, on 6 September 1940, and it participated in the Carolina Maneuvers as part of the 9th Infantry Division. On 11 December 1941, shortly after the United States entered World War II, he became the commander of the I Corps Artillery at Fort Jackson, South Carolina, with the wartime rank of colonel. In April 1942, he assumed command of the 30th Infantry Division Artillery at Camp Blanding, Florida, with the temporary rank of brigadier general from 28 May 1942. On 1 September 1943 he became commanding general of the III Corps Artillery at Camp Gordon, Georgia. For his service as commanding general, Harper was awarded the Legion of Merit.

On 8 April 1944, he assumed command of the XXIV Corps Artillery in Hawaii. The organization had been activated on 25 March and consisted of two battalions of 155 mm guns and two of 155 mm howitzers formed from field artillery and coast artillery units originally assigned to the defense of Oahu. Its 145th Field Artillery Battalion had seen service in the Battle of Kwajalein but the rest were new to combat. The XXIV Corps Artillery was assigned to the V Amphibious Corps for Operation Forager, the seizure of the Mariana Islands. It provided the US Marines with heavier artillery weapons than they had in previous operations in the Central Pacific Area.

The XXIV Corps Artillery, under Harper's command, participated in the Battle of Saipan, where it fired 37,730 rounds. In the subsequent Battle of Tinian, Harper also commanded the four battalions of the 27th Infantry Division Artillery and five Marine Corps 105 mm howitzer battalions, two each from the 2nd Marine Division and the 4th Marine Division, and one from the V Amphibious Corps, for a total of thirteen battalions. For his service in the Mariana Islands, Harper was awarded an oak leaf cluster to his Legion of Merit and the Bronze Star Medal.

Harper then assumed command of the 98th Infantry Division in Hawaii on 22 October 1944, with the temporary rank of major general from 6 February 1945. The division did not see combat, but participated in the occupation of Japan after the war ended. For his service commanding the 98th Infantry Division, he was awarded a second oak leaf cluster to his Legion of Merit.

== Post-war ==
The 98th Infantry Division was inactivated in Japan on 16 February 1946, and Harper reverted to his substantive rank of colonel on 30 June. He served as assistant chief of staff (G-4) of the Second United States Army at Fort Meade, Maryland, from 1 July 1946 to 16 Nov 1947. He then served under Major General James Van Fleet as deputy commander of the American Mission to Greece during the Greek Civil War. Harper was restored to the rank of major general on 24 January 1948. On 1 December he joined the staff of Commander-in-Chief, United States Naval Forces Eastern Atlantic and Mediterranean, based in London. His final assignment, on 28 March 1950, was as commanding general of the Artillery Center and commandant of the United States Army Field Artillery School at Fort Sill. He led a successful campaign to keep the Field Artillery School there. He retired in December 1953. He was awarded a Commendation Ribbon.

Harper died at the age of 78 in Saint Petersburg, Florida, on 23 February 1972 and was buried in Enderlin, North Dakota.

== Dates of rank ==
Insignia	Rank	Component	Date	Reference
No insignia at the time	Second Lieutenant	Cavalry	20 April 1917	
	First Lieutenant	Cavalry	15 May 1917	
	Captain (temporary)	Cavalry	5 August 1917	
	Captain	Cavalry	5 May 1920	
	Captain	Field Artillery	1 July 1920	
	Major	Field Artillery	1 November 1932	
	Lieutenant Colonel	Field Artillery	1 July 1940	
	Colonel	Army of the United States	11 December 1941	
	Brigadier General	Army of the United States	28 May 1942	
	Major General	Army of the United States	6 February 1945	
	Colonel	Field Artillery	28 December 1945	
	Colonel (reverted)	Field Artillery	30 January 1946	
	Major General	Regular Army	24 January 1948	

== Notes ==
Military offices
Preceded by Joseph M. Swing	Commandant of the United States Army Field Artillery School; 1950–1953	Succeeded by Charles E. Hart
