= Dennis Hadley Currie =

United States military officer

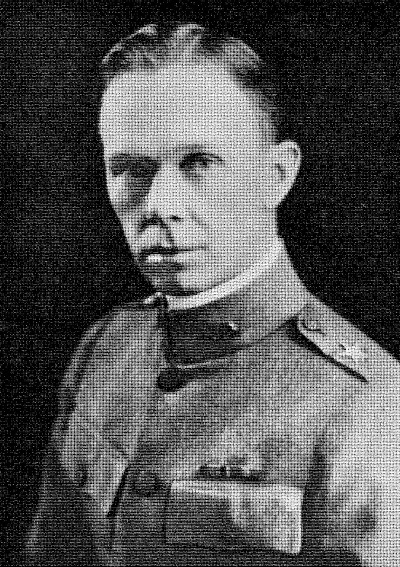
- Born: 22 July 1874; Glen Rose, Texas
- Died: 26 March 1928 (aged 53); Piedmont, California
- Military career
- Allegiance: United States of America
- Branch: United States Army
- Rank: Brigadier General
- Service number: 0-1338
- Conflicts: Occupation of Vera Cruz; World War I

Dennis Hadley Currie (22 July 1874 – 26 March 1928) was a United States military officer. He was mainly involved with the United States Artillery and served in various parts of the country, as well as during the U.S. occupation of Veracruz (1914).

== Early life and education ==
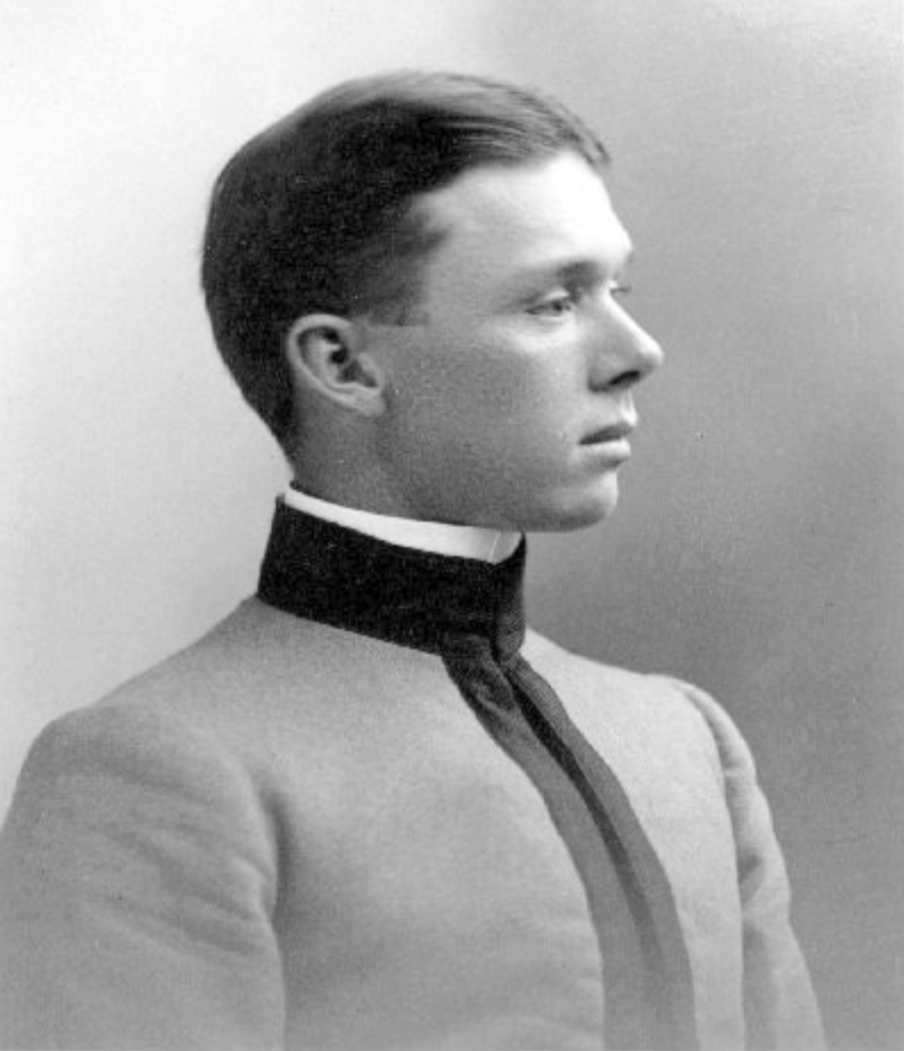
At West Point in 1901

Currie was born on 22 July 1874 to Angus Currie and his wife in Glen Rose, Texas. He attended Glen Rose High School and later a nearby small college. In 1901, he graduated from the United States Military Academy at West Point. Currie was also a graduate of the Infantry and Cavalry School (1907) and Army Staff College (1908) at Fort Leavenworth, Kansas.

== Military career ==
After graduating from West Point, Currie was commissioned as a second lieutenant in the Artillery Corps (later known as the Field Artillery) on 2 February 1901. A few years later, he advanced to first lieutenant in 1905 and then captain of the 3rd Field Artillery in 1911. Most of Currie's career was spent within the artillery and he was posted at various military posts during 1908–1917, including: Fort Sheridan in Illinois, Fort Sam Houston in Texas, Fort Sill in Oklahoma and the Schofield Barracks in Hawaii. Between 1911 and 1912, Currie served as inspector-instructor of the Militia in Colorado, Utah, California and Oregon. On 23 December 1913 he joined the Signal Corps, serving as a commander from 1914 to 1915 in Texas City, Texas, and Vera Cruz, Mexico. Later on 3 October 1917, Currie became part of the General Staff and was stationed in both Washington, D.C., and France until 15 May 1918, when he was promoted to colonel of field artillery of the National Army. A few months later, Currie was promoted to brigadier general on 1 October 1918. He retired due to a disability on 31 December 1922. Towards the end of his career Currie returned to Fort Sill, where he was commandant of the Field Artillery School, which he also helped organize and initiate.

== Personal life and death ==
Currie was married and had two children, son William Ross Curie and daughter Annie Virginia Currie. He suffered from an illness throughout his life, which delayed his graduation from West Point. This illness also caused his early retirement and eventually contributed to Currie's early death at the age of 53 in Piedmont, California, on 26 March 1928. He was buried at the San Francisco National Cemetery three days later. Though a lieutenant colonel at the time of his military retirement, he was posthumously advanced to brigadier general in June 1930 having served temporarily at that rank from October 1918 to June 1919 during World War I.
