= Keep 'Em Rolling =

1934 film by George Archainbaud

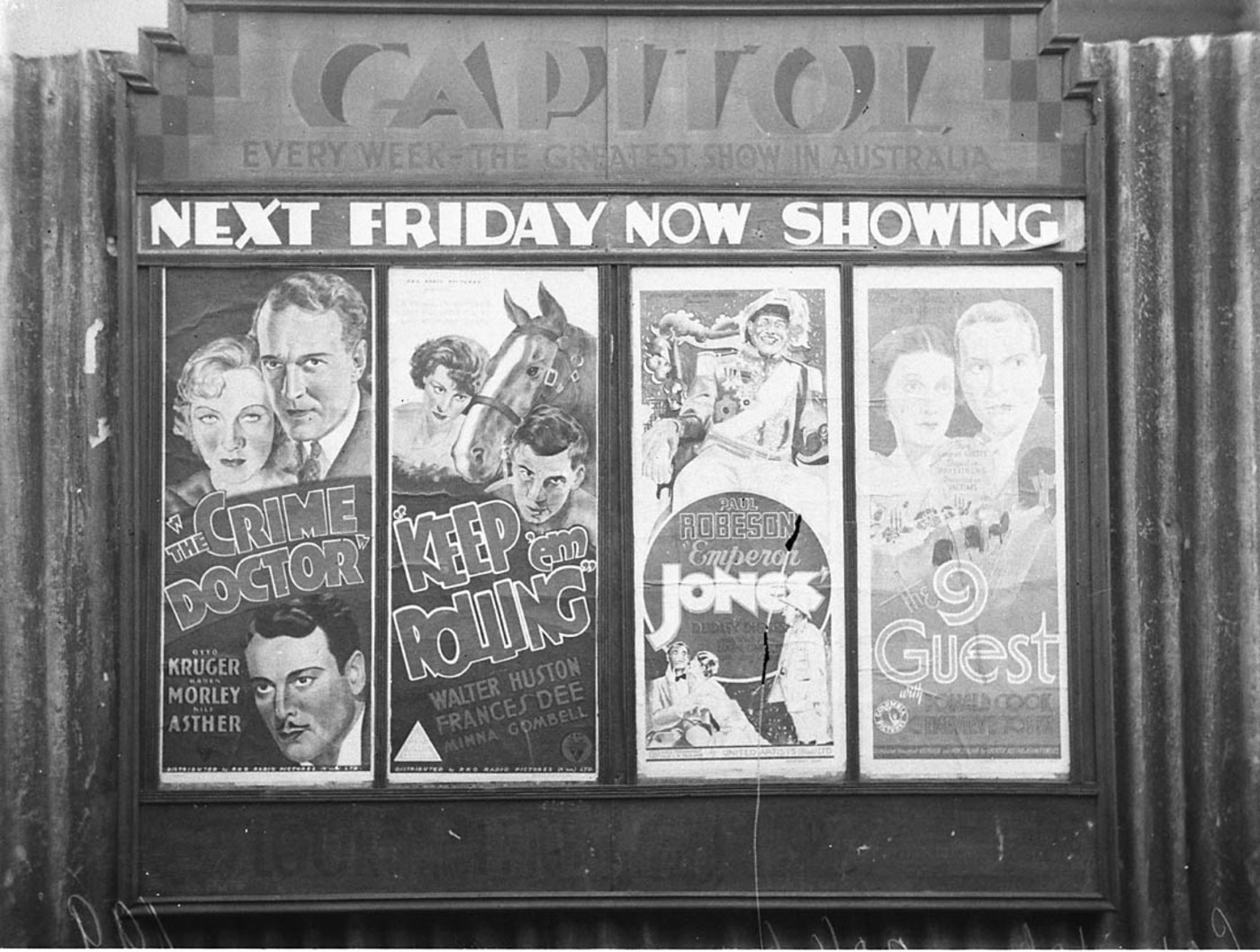
- Poster for the film at a theater in Australia
- Directed by: George Archainbaud; Argyle Nelson (assistant)
- Written by: Albert Shelby Le Vino; F. McGrew Willis
- Based on: Rodney by Leonard Hastings Nason
- Produced by: Merian C. Cooper; William Sistrom (associate)
- Starring: Walter Huston; Frances Dee
- Cinematography: Harold Wenstrom; William Casel
- Edited by: William Hamilton
- Music by: Max Steiner
- Production company: RKO Radio Pictures
- Release date: March 2, 1934 (US)
- Running time: 72 minutes
- Country: United States
- Language: English

Keep 'Em Rolling is a 1934 American drama film, directed by George Archainbaud from a screenplay by Albert Shelby Le Vino and F. McGrew Willis. It starred Walter Huston and Frances Dee and the men of the U.S. Army's 16th Field Artillery Regiment. Filmed partially at Fort Myer, Virginia, with then-Captain Harold W. Blakeley as technical advisor, the story revolves around a World War I field artillery horse named Rodney and his soldier, Benny Walsh (played by Walter Huston). The movie is based on the short story "Rodney" written by Leonard Hastings Nason that appeared on January 21, 1933, issue of the Saturday Evening Post magazine.

== See also ==
- List of films about horses
