= John S. Crosby (general) =

United States Army general (1932–2022)

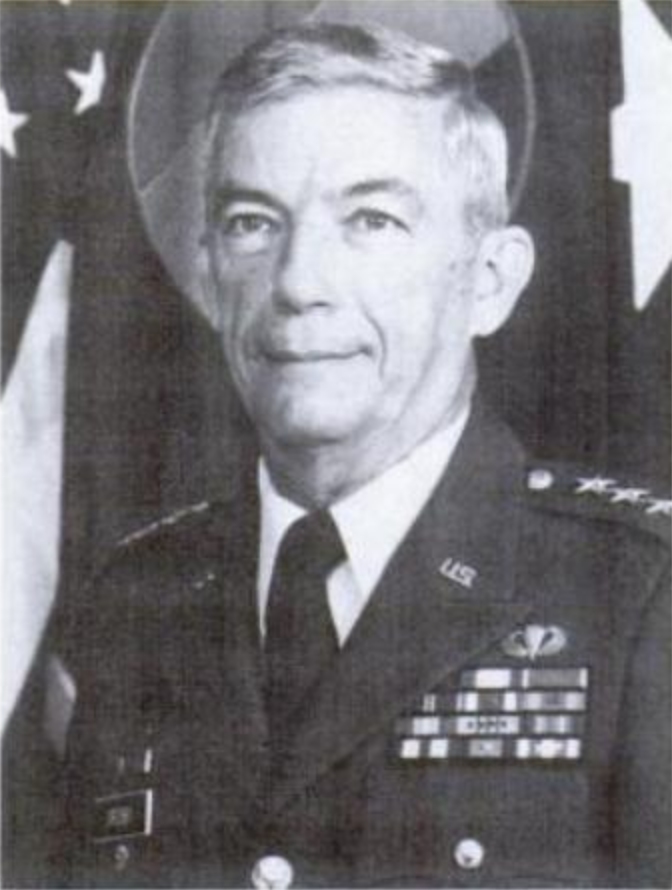
- Born: October 16, 1932; Jefferson Barracks, Missouri, U.S.
- Died: March 2, 2022 (aged 89); Highlands Ranch, Colorado, U.S.
- Military career
- Allegiance: United States
- Branch: United States Army
- Service years: early 1950s–1989
- Rank: Lieutenant general
- Commands: United States Army Field Artillery School

John S. Crosby (October 16, 1932 – March 2, 2022) was a lieutenant general in the United States Army. He was commissioned through ROTC at North Carolina State University. From 1987 to 1989, he served as Deputy Commanding General for Training of the United States Army Training and Doctrine Command (TRADOC). Crosby died at the age of 89 in 2022.
