= Edward Thomas Williams =

United States Army general

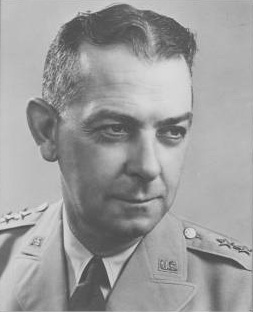
- General Williams as commander of the Field Artillery Center
- Born: 6 February 1901; Detroit, Michigan
- Died: 14 October 1973 (aged 72) San Antonio, Texas
- Buried: Fort Sam Houston National Cemetery
- Allegiance: United States
- Branch: United States Army
- Service years: 1918–1961
- Rank: Lieutenant general
- Commands: Third United States Army Artillery; United States Army Field Artillery Center; Fourth United States Army
- Conflicts: World War II
- Awards: Distinguished Service Medal; Legion of Merit; Bronze Star

Edward Thomas Williams (1901–1973) was a lieutenant general in the United States Army. He gained prominence as chief of artillery for the Third United States Army in Europe during World War II, commander of the United States Army Field Artillery Center, and commander of the Fourth United States Army.

== Early life ==
Williams was born in Detroit, Michigan, on 6 February 1901. He graduated from the United States Military Academy at West Point in 1920.

== Early career ==
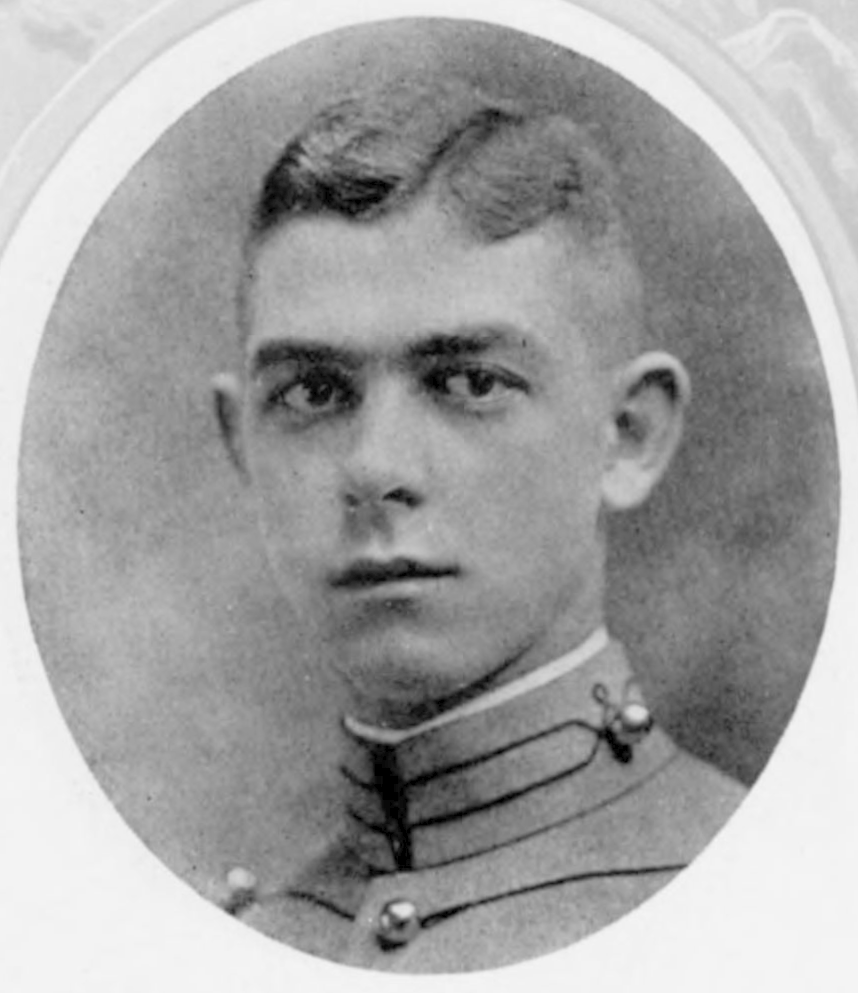
At West Point in 1920

In 1921 Williams graduated from the Field Artillery Basic Course.

Williams served in artillery assignments of increasing rank and responsibility throughout the 1920s and 1930s, including a posting to Schofield Barracks, Hawaii, as a member of the 13th Field Artillery Regiment, assignment to Aberdeen Proving Ground, Maryland, and a position as an instructor at Fort Sill, Oklahoma.

In 1939 Williams graduated from the Command and General Staff College.

== World War II ==
Williams served as commander of the Third United States Army Artillery during World War II, taking part in operations throughout Europe after the D-Day invasion and earning the Distinguished Service Medal.

== Post World War II ==
From 1950 to 1952 Williams was assigned as deputy chief of staff for operations at the U.S. Army European Command.

Williams served as chief of staff for U.S. Army, Europe from 1952 to 1953.

In 1953 Williams was appointed deputy commander of the Third United States Army, serving until 1954.

Williams was then named commander of the United States Army Field Artillery Center, serving from 1954 to 1956.

In 1956 Williams was named deputy commander of the Continental Army Command, a position he held until 1959.

In 1958 he chaired the Williams Board, which reviewed and recommended changes to the Army's professional education system for officers.

Williams was selected to command the Fourth United States Army in 1959, and he served in this post until his retirement.

While commanding the Fourth Army Williams represented the United States at the funeral of Walter Williams of Texas, who claimed to have been a Confederate soldier and the last living American Civil War veteran.

== Retirement and awards ==
General Williams retired in 1961. His awards and decorations included two Distinguished Service Medals, the Legion of Merit, Bronze Star Medal and the Order of the Patriotic War First Class (Union of Soviet Socialist Republics).

== Death and burial ==
Williams died on 14 October 1973, in San Antonio, Texas. He was buried at Fort Sam Houston National Cemetery, Section PA, Site 249-C.
