= Sean P. Stellato =

American sports agent (born 1978)

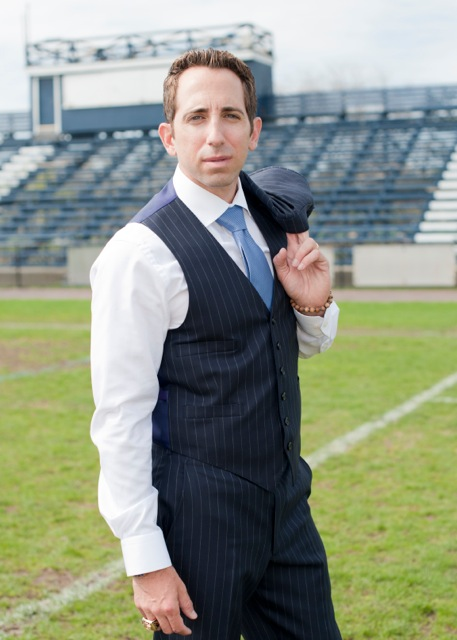
Stellato

Sean P. Stellato (born April 12, 1978) is an American sports agent, motivational speaker, and author. A native of Salem, Massachusetts who lives in the Boston area, he became nationally known after one of his clients, Tommy DeVito, an undrafted rookie, made his NFL debut in Week 8 of the National Football League season at quarterback and led the New York Giants to a victory against the Green Bay Packers.

After a Giants touchdown, television cameras cut to Stellato, clad in a black suit, gold chain and fedora. He was pinching his fingers as DeVito’s father, Tom, planted a kiss on his cheek. Commentator Peyton Manning referred to Stellato’s pinstriped suit and matching fedora, which brought him attention from the media nationwide.

Soon after that game, Stellato appeared on The Pat McAfee Show. He said he was "just very excited for the moment right now." He told McAfee during the interview that he became an agent to stay "as close to the game (of football) as possible."

At 5-foot-10, Stellato played wide receiver at Marist College and is known for his zeal for his Italian heritage and fashion flair. He transitioned to finance and became an agent in 2013.

== The "Italian Stallion" of sports agents ==
In an interview with The Salem News (Massachusetts), DeVito called Stellato "the Italian Stallion" of sports agents. "Sean is always in my corner and will do whatever it takes to help me with my career, on and off the field."

Steven Van Zandt, who plays Silvio on the Sopranos, tweeted that Stellato was "the Silvio of the Family," meaning the consigliere, or right-hand. With his help, DeVito landed a deal with Rao’s Homemade Pasta Sauce.

On The Tonight Show, host Jimmy Fallon, dressed as Stellato, sang Dean Martin's "That's Amore" about DeVito while holding an Italian sub.

Within hours of the Giants again naming DeVito as their starter against Tampa Bay for a game on Nov. 24, Stellato was taking calls from and making appearances on podcasts and talk shows.

Stellato carries football trading cards to give to children. In 2024, he began a partnership with Hyatt hotels and hopes to leverage his visibility to find opportunities for his clients.

=== Players Stellato represents ===
Stellato claims to have represented nearly 20 Super Bowl winners in a long career as an agent. After gaining national attention, four clients signed up with him. Stellato is uncertain if his celebrity influenced their decision. "The Rolodex got enhanced," he said, "both on and off the field."

==== Chris Manhertz, New York Giants ====
Sean Stellato has represented New York Giants tight end Chris Manhertz for all nine years of his NFL career.

"When I first met him, he had a three-piece suit on, and that was at a diner in the Bronx," Manhertz told NorthJersey.com. Manhertz, who played basketball at Canisius College, wanted to try for a pro football career.

"We sat down and gave me his value proposition if you will, and I bought in," Manhertz told NorthJersey.com. "Over time, he earned my trust. He's as authentic as they come. He leans into it, and many more people know who he is now, but that's always been the Sean I know."

"Have you ever bought a stock when it was low, and you just held onto it for a few years, waiting for that stock to pop, and now it's having a good year, and you've had it the whole time - that's him, that's Sean," Manhertz told NewJersey.com.

"He works hard for us, and he's real. He's a little bit of a celebrity now, but he's the same guy he's always been. That underdog mentality appealed to me, and it's never changed. To me, for me, he's earned it."

== SES Sports ==
Stellato founded SES Sports in 2013. He is president and sole agent.

“There’s a lot of great football players that go undrafted, that are underdogs, that never get the exposure,” Stellato told the New York Times. "My goal has been to service my clients, to build it brick by brick. At Stellato Sports, we've been able to do that, and you never know when that moment is going to come. In martial arts, my instructor always used to tell me, 'Expect the unexpected.'"

Stellato said he wants to be an inspiration for the underdog.

In an interview with The New York Times, he said that he felt very fortunate, very blessed, and very grateful to represent talented young athletes and valued the opportunity to contribute to their careers.

== Athletics ==
Stellato attended Salem High School, where he played on the football and basketball teams. Stellato led the Witches to a Super Bowl appearance in 1994 and the basketball team to a state title in 1995.

At Gunnery Prep, he was named MVP in football and basketball and was named All-New England in both sports after scoring 30 touchdowns and averaging 30 points per game. Gunnery Prep, a private boarding school in Connecticut, inducted him into its athletics hall of fame in 2018 and retired his No. 14 football jersey on April 27, 2024. He played at the school in 1996-97 and was the first player there to have his jersey number retired.

"It was the most influential year of my life," Stellato told the Marblehead (Massachusetts) Weekly News. "It's almost hard to put into words what that year did for me." Stellato told Item Live that he "left there as a lifelong learner. I learned core values."

During his induction speech, Stellato said he "wanted to hone in [sic] on the people that have supported and influenced me. A lot of time, you don’t have the chance to look people in the eye with gratitude."

He said if he hadn't gone to Gunnery, he "would've gone another route and lived a completely different life. I’ve sent four kids to Gunnery over the years, and they've done well. I'm hoping to extend that pipeline a little bit."

At Marist College, Stellato played receiver on the football team. Stellato played football on scholarship and basketball at Marist. In the 2000 and 2001 seasons, he led the Red Foxes in touchdown receptions.

=== Football career ===
Stellato played two seasons in the AF2 (AF2), signing his first contract with the Florida Firecats in 2002. He also played with the Louisville Fire and the Memphis Xplorers. He went to Mini Camp with the New York Dragons.

He coached defensive backs for the Ipswich High School Tigers during the 2003 season. Stellato also coached at Peabody Veterans Memorial High School as a quarterbacks coach in 2004. He became a member of the St. John's Prep football coaching staff in 2006.

=== Stellato's fashion ===
"My late grandfather wore a fedora, and I always loved Sinatra and Stallone, or Rocky Balboa," Stellato told Shop Rat.

His grandmother, Littizza Lillian Stellato, who immigrated from Calabria to Boston and lived with his family growing up, worked in the men’s department at Filene's Basement until she was 86 and bought him his first suit. "She always said that you must dress for success and visualize yourself in those moments," Stellato said.

"Fashion is something I’m passionate about," Stellato said. "It's how I express myself, and it gives me confidence. It's almost like my Superman cape."

"It's a way to get me in the zone," he continued. "If you look good, you perform well. My guys take a lot of pride in how they present themselves when they run through the tunnel onto the field, and I feel the same way when I walk into an NFL stadium."

Sean primarily wears fedoras from Bellissimo Hats in Brooklyn and Borsalino in Italy, as per a New York Times interview.

== Books ==
Stellato is the author of two books: 4th and Long The Odds: My Journey and No Backing Down, both about his life and sports. No Backing Down was featured in the Patriots Hall of Fame in 2015.

== Honors and awards ==
In 2013, Stellato was inducted into the Massachusetts Italian American Sports Hall of Fame. That same year he was inducted into the Salem High School Hall of Fame. In 2014, he was honored with the Moynihan Lumber Post Graduate Achievement Award.

In 2016, he was featured on the October cover of Northshore magazine as one of their "Movers and Shakers". In August 2016, Stellato was selected as one of the Boston Business Journal's "40 Under 40".

In December 2023, he was inducted into the National Italian American Sports Hall of Fame in Chicago as part of their 44th annual class.

=== Sean Stellato Day ===
Marist College declared October 26 as Sean Stellato Day.

Stellato graduated in 2002 and played basketball and football there. He led the Red Foxes in touchdown catches in 2000 and 2001. At halftime of its homecoming game in 2024, Marist presented Stellato with a framed replica of his football jersey.

The school handed out a limited number of Marist-branded fedoras, Stellato's signature headwear.

=== Meeting Pope Francis ===
On June 26, 2024, Stellato met Pope Francis in Vatican City and gave him a custom football with the Pope's coat of arms emblem. Stellato was in Rome on business when the Vatican granted him a meeting with the Pope.

Stellato said the invitation happened after an interview with social media personality Taylen Biggs in Las Vegas during the leadup to Super Bowl LVIII. Stellato, in a conversation about his clothing that day, which included Gucci python loafers, told Biggs he admired the Pope.

“I got to sit in the presence of Your Holiness and have a conversation with him in basic Italian," Stellato told the New York Times. "I told him, 'Sono un agente sportivo' — I am a sports agent, and this is a regalo, a gift for you. And he passed a little wisdom on. 'You’re glorifying God with your work.' When we locked eyes, it was almost like a sense of blessings ran through my DNA."

==== Bobblehead reveal ====
On December 11, 2024, the National Bobblehead Hall of Fame and Museum introduced Stellato's first bobblehead figurine. It features Stellato in a black pinstripe suit, matching fedora, and a gold chain, the same outfit he wore when he became an internet sensation on Monday Night Football in 2023.

Stellato said he would donate some proceeds from bobblehead sales to the Arthritis Foundation in honor of his daughter, Gianna, who battles juvenile arthritis.

== Family ==
Originally from Boston, Stellato lives in Massachusetts with his wife, Krista, and their four daughters, Gianna, Giulietta, Sophia Belle, and Siena Sicily.

In his speech at his induction into the Salem High School Athletics Hall of Fame, Stellato expressed his appreciation for his family. "I carry my name with such pride. I think of everyone that’s come before me. My kids can see firsthand that through hard work, grit, and tenacity, you can do anything you want. Using athletics as that platform can differentiate you."
