= Laurin Leonard Lawson =

American general

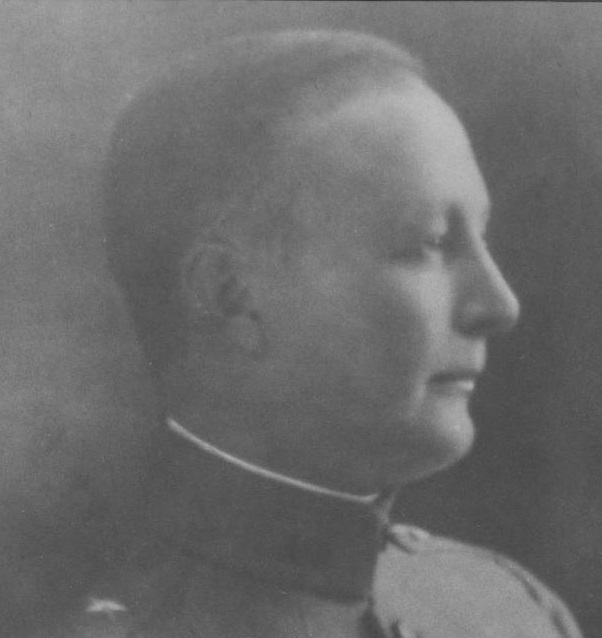
- Lawson as commandant of the Field Artillery School in 1918
- Born: March 11, 1876; St Peter, Minnesota
- Died: January 28, 1938 (aged 61); Washington, DC
- Military career
- Allegiance: United States of America
- Branch: United States Army
- Service years: 1899–1938
- Rank: Brigadier General
- Service number: 0-1258
- Wars: Spanish–American War; Philippine–American War; United States occupation of Veracruz; Pancho Villa Expedition; World War I

Laurin Leonard Lawson (March 11, 1876 – January 28, 1938) was an American brigadier general.

== Early life and education ==
Laurin Leonard Lawson was born to Magne Lawson and Hannah Lawson on March 11, 1876, in St Peter, Minnesota. He went to public school in LaCrosse, Wisconsin. After completing his education, Lawson worked as the shipping clerk for the Washington Shoe Manufacturing Company of Seattle.

== Military career ==
Lawson enlisted in the 1st Washington Infantry and served between 1898 and 1899. In 1899, he commissioned as a first lieutenant in the 39th U.S. Volunteer Infantry. He was honorably mustered out in 1901, but returned to service as a second lieutenant in the artillery branch. He was promoted to first lieutenant again in 1903, and was transferred to the 3rd Field Artillery in 1907. Later that year, he was transferred to the 4th Field Artillery and was promoted to captain. During this time, he was deployed three times to the Philippines.

Lawson also participated in the United States occupation of Veracruz in 1914 and the Punitive Expedition in 1916 and 1917.

Lawson made colonel on February 6, 1918, and in May that year he became commandant of the Artillery School at Fort Sill, Oklahoma. On October 1, 1918, he was promoted to brigadier general. He left the Artillery School in December of that year, and went on to command the 15th Field Artillery Brigade at Camp Stanley, Texas.

At the time of his death, Lawson was on active duty with the organized Reserve at Fort Bragg, North Carolina.

== Death ==
Lawson died on January 28, 1938, in Washington, D.C. He was buried at Arlington National Cemetery.
