= Delbert L. Bristol =

United States Army officer

- Born: September 20, 1918; Nebraska
- Died: April 3, 1980 (aged 61); Florissant, Missouri
- Burial place: Jefferson Barracks National Cemetery
- Military career
- Allegiance: United States
- Branch: United States Army
- Rank: Colonel
- Commands: 10th Air Transport Brigade, 11th Air Assault Division
- Conflicts: World War II; Korean War; Vietnam War
- Awards: Legion of Merit; Bronze Star; Air Medal; Army Commendation Medal; European-African-Middle Eastern Campaign Medal; World War II Victory Medal

Delbert L. Bristol (September 20, 1918 – April 3, 1980) served as an Aviation Artillery Officer attached to the II Corps during World War II and was the first such officer to create a Corps level Air Artillery staff. His negotiations during the transition of the Army Air Corps into the United States Air Force assisted in the establishment of the Army's organic aviation efforts following the separation. He was inducted in the Army Aviation Hall of Fame in 1976.
