= United States Army Field Artillery School =

U.S. Army school for training in field artillery tactics and procedures

Coordinates: 34.6511°N 98.4089°W

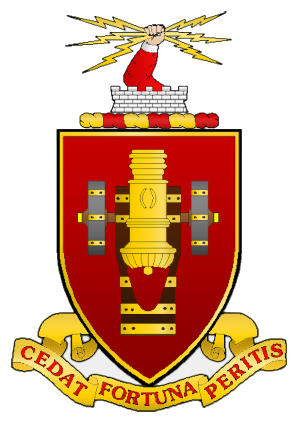
- Device of the United States Army Field Artillery School
- Founded: 1911
- Country: United States
- Allegiance: United States Army Transformation and Training Command
- Branch: United States Army
- Type: Field Artillery
- Part of: Fires Center of Excellence
- Garrison/HQ: Fort Sill, Oklahoma
- Mottos: Cedat Fortuna Peritis (Let Fortune Yield to Experience, or Skill is Better than Luck)
- Website: Official website

Insignia
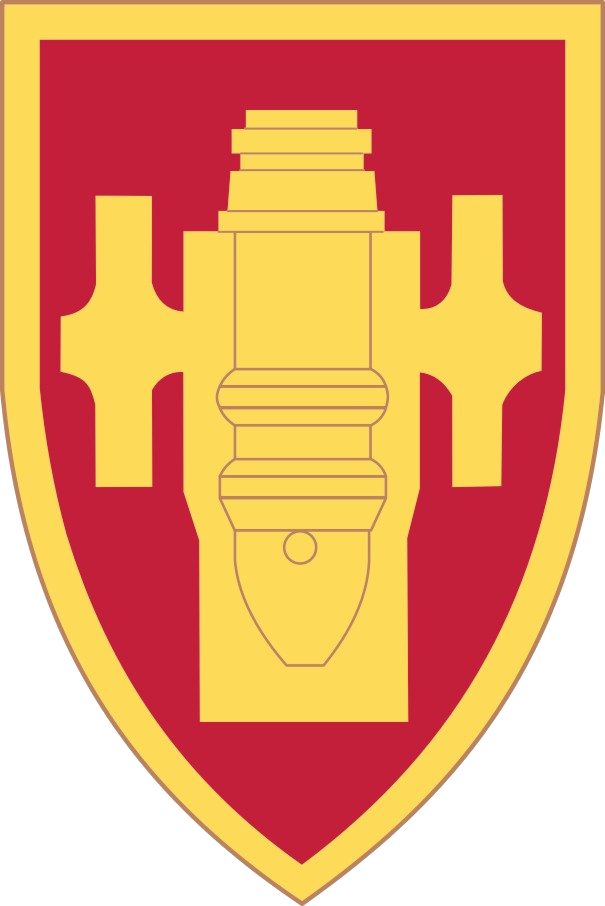
- Shoulder sleeve insignia

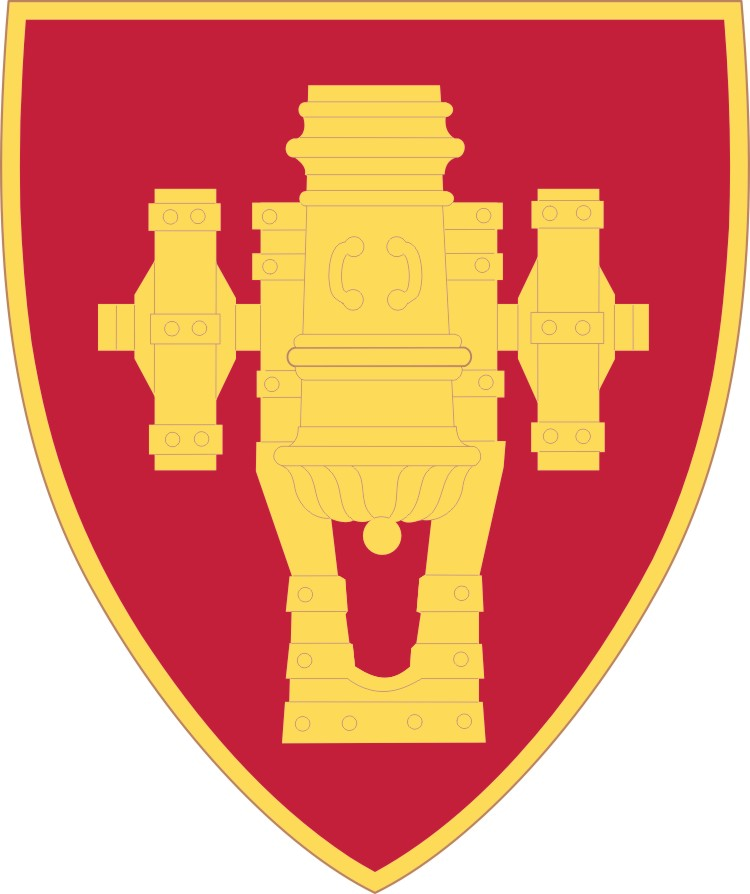
- Distinctive unit insignia

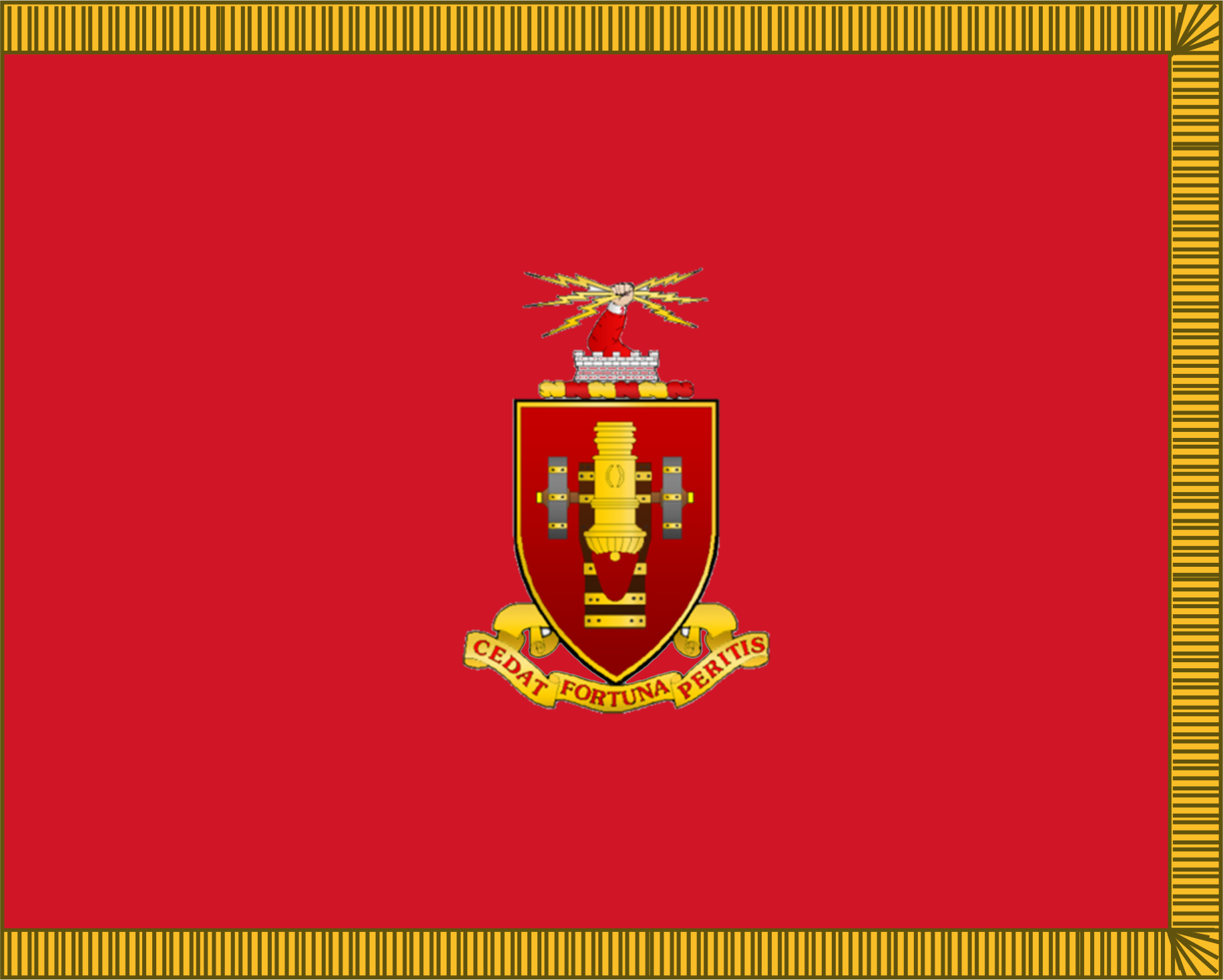
- US Army Field Artillery School Flag

The United States Army Field Artillery School (USAFAS) trains Field Artillery Soldiers and Marines in tactics, techniques, and procedures for the employment of fire support systems in support of the maneuver commander. The school trains soldiers and leaders alongside developing and disseminating field artillery doctrine. The school is currently located at Fort Sill, Oklahoma.

== Mission ==
The mission of the Field Artillery School: The U.S. Army Field Artillery School trains and educates soldiers and leaders; engages, collaborates and partners with other branches, sister-services and other fires warfighting function proponents; and serves as the lead agent for the development of Field Artillery doctrine, concepts and dissemination of that knowledge to the Field Artillery force in support of commanders operating across the full spectrum of conflict and in the joint, inter-organizational and multinational (JIM) environment.

== Endstate ==
The U.S. Army Field Artillery enables maneuver commanders to dominate in Unified Land Operations through effective targeting, integration and delivery of fires.

== Heraldry ==
=== Device ===
Shield: Gules, a field piece of the 16th century paleways in plan Or.

Crest: On a wreath of the colors (Or and Gules) the arm of Saint Barbara embowed clothed of the second, issuing from the upper portion of an embattled tower Argent, and grasping flashes of lightning Proper.

Motto: CEDAT FORTUNA PERITIS (Let Fortune Yield to Experience, or Skill is Better than Luck).

Symbolism:The shield is red for Artillery; the field piece depicted, having been used in the 16th century, is the forerunner of the modern artillery. The crest is the arm of Saint Barbara, the patron saint of Artillery, holding flashes of lightning alluding to the pagan idea of Jove's ability to destroy with his bolts that which offended him.

Background: The device was originally approved for The Field Artillery School on 8 April 1926. It was redesignated for The Artillery School on 19 May 1954. On 11 September 1957 the device was redesignated for the U.S. Artillery and Missile School. On 13 February 1969 it was redesignated for the U.S. Field Artillery School.

=== Shoulder sleeve insignia ===
Description/Blazon: On a scarlet shield edged with a 1/8 inch (0.32 cm) yellow border, 3 inches (7.6 cm) in height and 2 inches (5.1 cm) in width overall, a yellow field piece.

Symbolism: The ancient field piece is taken from the device of the Field Artillery School, as well as the colors scarlet and yellow which are for Artillery.

Background: The shoulder sleeve insignia was originally approved on 17 July 1970 for the U.S. Army Field Artillery School. It was amended on 9 June 1981 to extend authorization for wear to include personnel assigned to the U.S. Army Field Artillery Center. (TIOH Dwg. No. A-1-188)

=== Distinctive unit insignia ===
Description/Blazon: A gold color metal and enamel device 1 inch (2.5 cm) in height overall on a shield Gules, a field piece of the 16th century paleways in plan Or.

Symbolism: The shield is red for Artillery; the field piece depicted, having been used in the 16th century, is the forerunner of the modern artillery.

Background: The distinctive unit insignia was originally approved for the Field Artillery School on 29 March 1930. It was redesignated for the Artillery School on 19 May 1954. On 11 September 1957 the insignia was redesignated for the U.S. Army Artillery and Missile School. The distinctive unit insignia was redesignated for the U.S. Field Army Artillery School on 13 February 1969. It was amended on 9 June 1981 to extend authorization for wear to personnel assigned to the U.S. Army Field Artillery Center.

== History ==
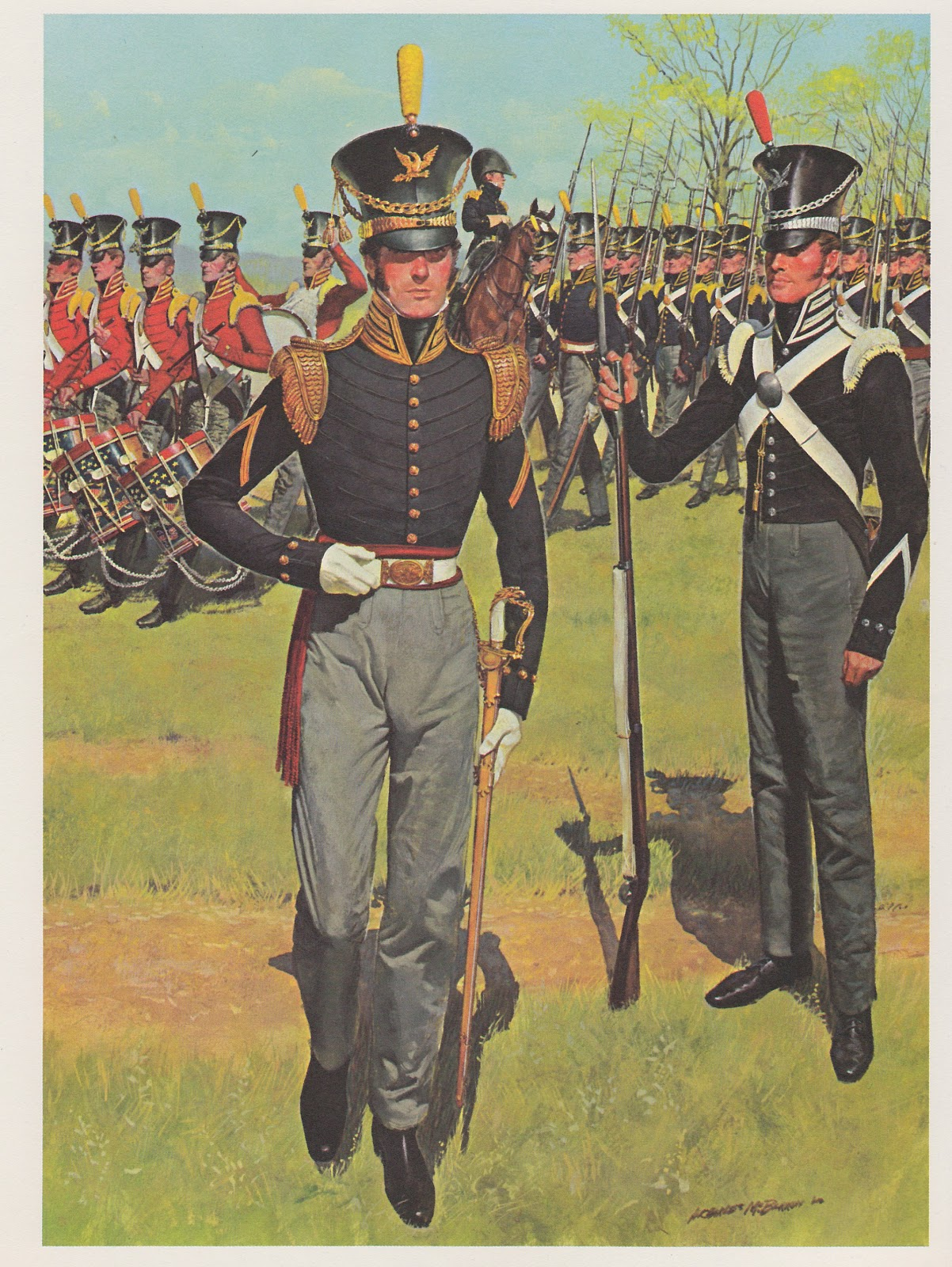
The Artillery School of Practice, a predecessor of USAFAS, was founded in 1824.

The origin of USAFAS can be traced back to the 1907 reorganization of the Artillery Corps and to the character of Fort Sill at that time. The 1907 reorganization created Coast and Field Artillery Branches. In the process of this reorganization, the Field Artillery was deprived of its former home at Fort Monroe, Virginia. Fort Sill was considered the best location for a Field Artillery school, since its 15,000-acre (61 km^{2}) reservation allowed ample room for target practice and its great variety of terrain offered an excellent area for different types of tactical training. In addition, the post had already assumed the character of the home of artillery with a large number of artillery units assigned.

The first artillery school, the US Army School of Fire, was organized in 1911 by Captain Dan Tyler Moore. With the exception of a brief period in 1916 when school troops were used as frontier security guards during the Mexican Revolution, the School has operated and expanded continuously. Hundreds of thousands of artillerymen have been trained at Fort Sill since the inception of the School.

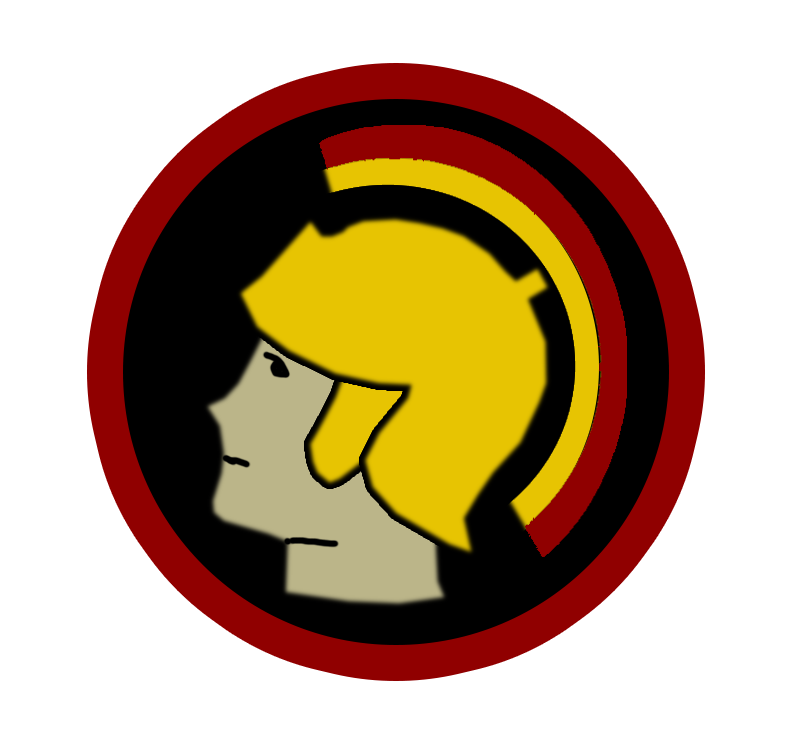
World War I Artillery School Insignia

After the United States entered World War I, the school reopened in 1917 with Col. William J. Snow as commandant. The Field Artillery School, as it was now known, added more courses. After the war, school commandants began a long-range program to improve field artillery mobility, gunnery and equipment. Budget cuts during the 1920s hampered their efforts, but innovative directors of the Gunnery Department, with support from school commandants, helped modernize the field artillery in the 1930s. Maj. Carlos Brewer, director of the Gunnery Department in the late 1920s and early 1930s, introduced new fire direction techniques so fire support would be more responsive. Maj. Orlando Ward, the next department director, developed the fire direction center to centralize command and control and to facilitate massing fire. Brewer, Ward, and Lt. Col. H.L.C. Jones encouraged replacing horses with motor vehicles for moving field artillery guns.

During World War II, to best use new long-range guns and better response times, the Field Artillery School championed the use of air observation to control artillery fires. The War Department approved organic field artillery air observation in 1942. The artillery air observers adjusted massed fire and performed liaison, reconnaissance, and other missions during the war. Following the war, the school adapted to the atomic age and the Cold War. The War Department consolidated all artillery training and developments under the U.S. Army Artillery Center at Fort Sill in 1946. At that time, the center included the Artillery School, the Antiaircraft and Guided Missile School at Fort Bliss, Texas, and the Coast Artillery School at Fort Scott, Calif. The air defense artillery became its own branch in 1968. In 1953, school personnel fired the first nuclear-capable fieldartillery gun (the 280mm gun known as Atomic Annie) at Frenchman's Flat, Nevada. During the 1950s, school personnel also helped develop rocket and missile warfare (The U.S. arsenal included the Honest John rocket, Corporal missile and Redstone missile) that could carry a nuclear warhead.

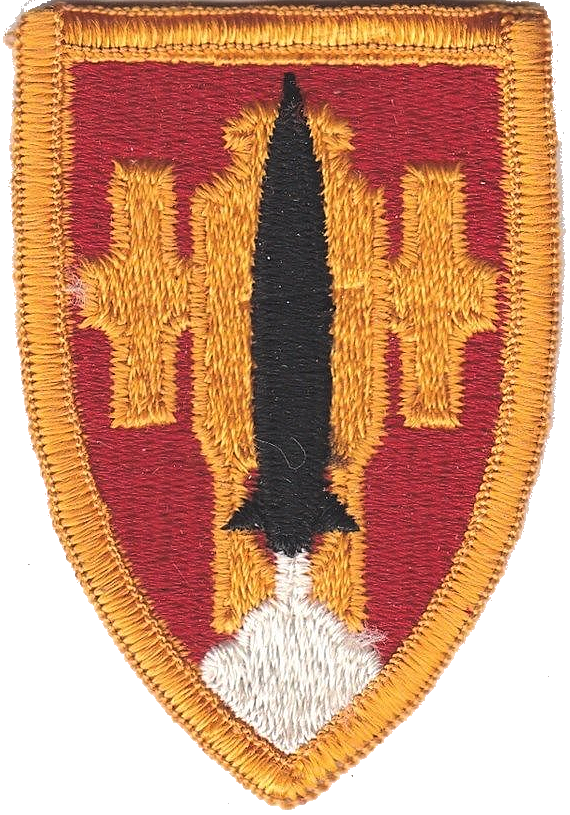
US Army Artillery and Missile School 1956-1968

From 1956-1968, the school was known as the US Army Artillery and Missile School (USAAMS) until Air Defense Artillery and Field Artillery became separate army branches in 1968.

In 1963, the school tested aerial rocket artillery, which equipped helicopters with rockets. As demonstrated in the Vietnam War, aerial rocket artillery was effective. The school cooperated in the development of the Field Artillery Digital Automated Computer, commonly called FADAC, to compute fire direction data. Introduced in 1966–67, FADAC made the field artillery a leader in computer developments for the Army. After the Vietnam War, the school participated in the introduction of the Multiple-Launch Rocket System, the Army Tactical Missile System, the Paladin 155-mm. self-propelled howitzer, and other field artillery systems.

The field artillery's performance in military operations in Operation Desert Storm in 1990-91 and Iraq and Afghanistan from 2001 to today validated the school's modernization efforts. Field artillery officers and soldiers can do complicated logarithmic calculations to fire a mission in one moment or they can escort a supply convoy, secure prisoners, patrol a village or any other mission the next.

=== Commandants ===
Commandants of the Artillery School include John Patten Story, who commanded from 1902 to 1904.

Other commandants have included:

1. Capt. Dan Tyler Moore, 1911–1914
2. Lt. Col. Edward F. McGlachlin Jr., 1914–1916
3. Col. William J. Snow, 1917
4. Brig. Gen. Adrian S. Fleming, 1917–1918
5. Brig. Gen. Laurin L. Lawson, 1918
6. Brig. Gen. Dennis H. Currie, 1918–1919
7. Brig. Gen. Edward T. Donnelly, 1919
8. Maj. Gen. Ernest Hinds, 1919–1923
9. Maj. Gen. George LeRoy Irwin, 1923–1928
10. Brig. Gen. Dwight E. Aultman, 1928–1929
11. Brig. Gen. William M. Cruikshank, 1930–1934
12. Maj. Gen. Henry W. Butner, 1934–1936
13. Brig. Gen. Augustine McIntyre Jr., 1936–1940
14. Brig. Gen. Donald C. Cubbison, 1940–1941
15. Brig. Gen. George R. Allin, 1941–1942
16. Brig. Gen. Jesmond D. Balmer, 1942–1944
17. Maj. Gen. Orlando Ward, 1944
18. Maj. Gen. Ralph McT. Pennell, 1944–1945
19. Maj. Gen. Louis E. Hibbs, 1945–1946
20. Maj. Gen. Clift Andrus, 1946–1949
21. Maj. Gen. Joseph M. Swing, 1949–1950
22. Maj. Gen. Arthur M. Harper, 1950–1953
23. Maj. Gen. Charles E. Hart, 1953–1954
24. Maj. Gen. Edward T. Williams, 1954–1956
25. Maj. Gen. Thomas E. deShazo, 1956–1959
26. Maj. Gen. Verdi B. Barnes, 1959–1961
27. Maj. Gen. Lewis S. Griffing, 1961–1964
28. Maj. Gen. Harry H. Critz, 1964–1967
29. Maj. Gen. Charles P. Brown, 1967–1970
30. Maj. Gen. Roderick Wetherill, 1970–1973
31. Maj. Gen. David E. Ott, 1973–1976
32. Maj. Gen. Donald R. Keith, 1976–1977
33. Maj. Gen. Jack N. Merritt, 1977–1980
34. Maj. Gen. Edward A. Dinges, 1980–1982
35. Maj. Gen. John S. Crosby, 1982–1985
36. Maj. Gen. Eugene S. Korpal, 1985–1987
37. Maj. Gen. Raphael J. Hallada, 1987–1991
38. Maj. Gen. Fred F. Marty, 1991–1993
39. Maj. Gen. John A. Dubia, 1993–1995
40. Maj. Gen. Randall L. Rigby, 1995–1997
41. Maj. Gen. Leo J. Baxter, 1997–1999
42. Maj. Gen. Toney Stricklin, 1999–2001
43. Maj. Gen. Michael D. Maples, 2001–2003
44. Maj. Gen. David P. Valcourt, 2003–2005
45. Maj. Gen. David C. Ralston, 2005–2007
46. Maj. Gen. Peter M. Vangjel, 2007–2009
47. Brig. Gen. Ross E. Ridge, 2009–2010
48. Brig. Gen. Thomas S. Vandal, 2011–2012
49. Brig. Gen. Brian J. McKiernan, 2012–2013
50. Brig. Gen. Christopher F. Bentley, 2013–2014
51. Brig. Gen. William A. Turner, 2014–2016
52. Brig. Gen. Stephen J. Maranian, 2016–2018
53. Brig. Gen. Stephen G. Smith 2018–2020
54. Brig. Gen. Winston P. "Phil" Brooks 2020–2021
55. Brig. Gen. Andrew D. Preston, 2021–2022
56. Col. Shane Morgan (Acting) 2022-2024
57. Brig. Gen. Alric “Ric” Francis, 2024-2025
58. Brig. Gen. Jason T. Williams, 2025-present

== See also ==
- Field Artillery Branch (United States)
- Field Artillery
- Ground combat element
