= Donald R. Keith =

United States Army general

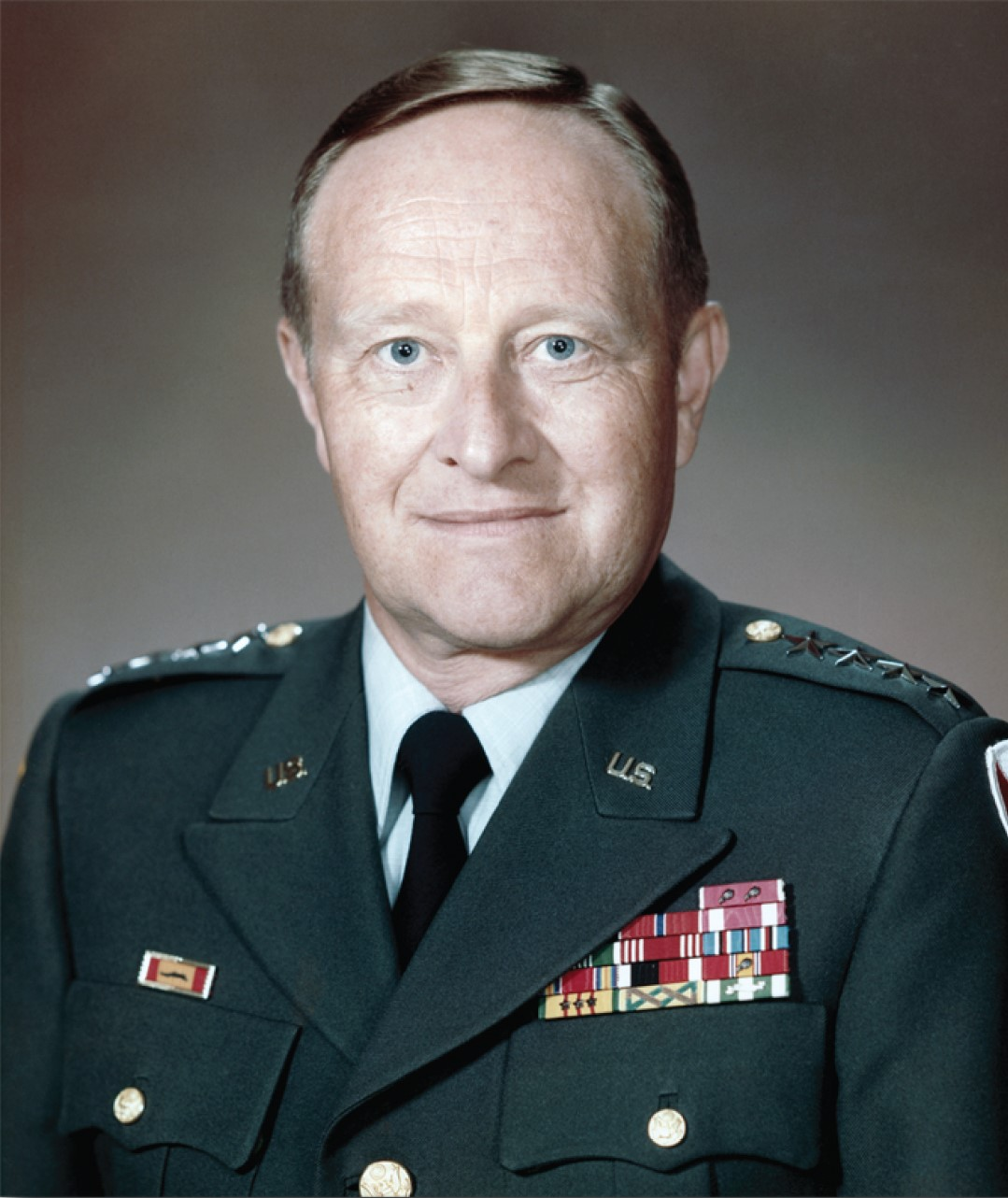
- General Donald R. Keith
- Born: 31 January 1927; Ludington, Michigan, US
- Died: 9 September 2004 (aged 77); Bristow, Virginia, US
- Burial place: Arlington National Cemetery
- Military career
- Allegiance: United States
- Branch: United States Army
- Service years: 1949–1984
- Rank: General
- Commands: United States Army Materiel Command; United States Army Field Artillery School
- Conflicts: World War II; Vietnam War
- Awards: Army Distinguished Service Medal (2); Legion of Merit (3); Bronze Star Medal
- Other work: Chairman, United States Field Artillery Association

General Donald Raymond Keith (31 January 1927 – 9 September 2004) was a United States Army general.

== Early life and education ==
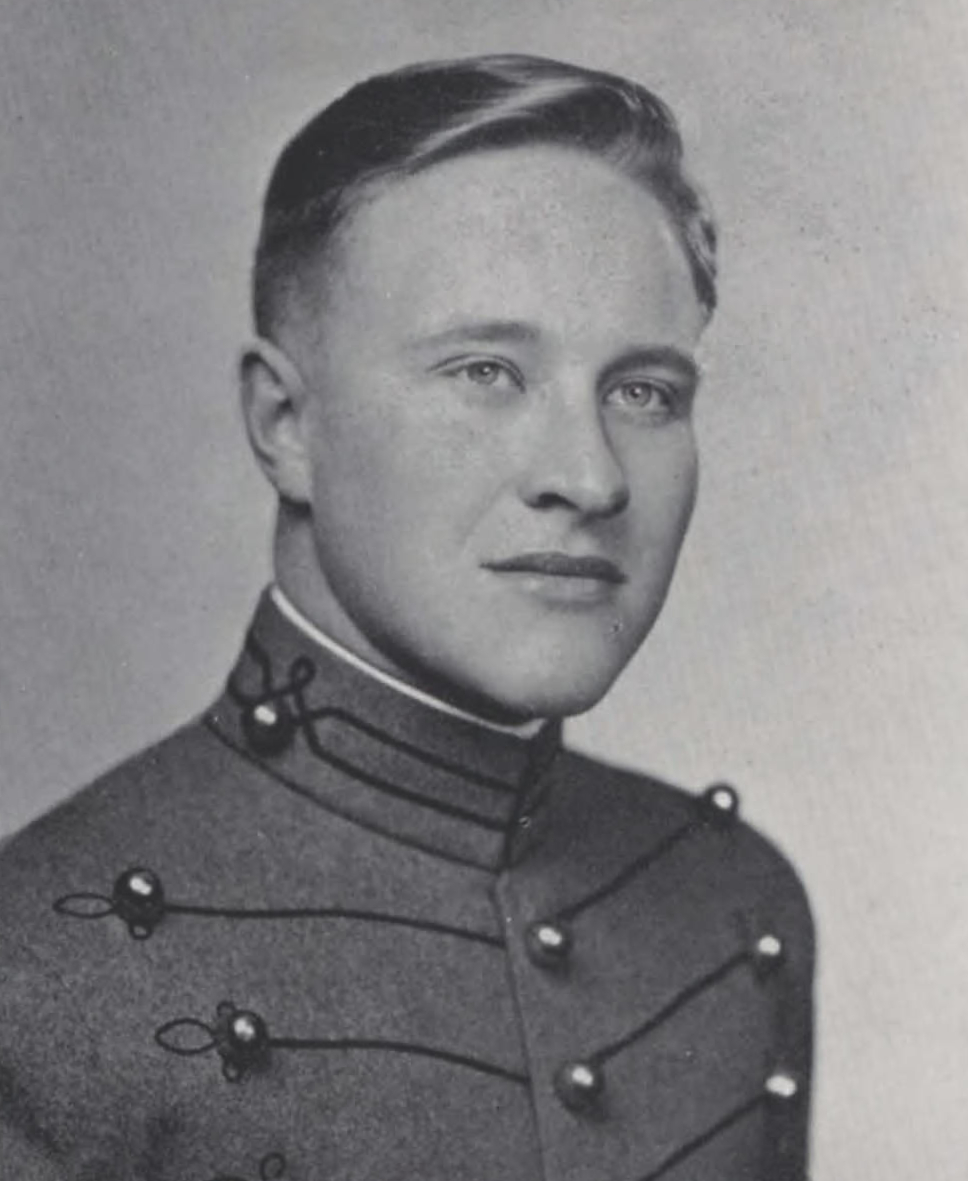
Keith as a United States Military Academy cadet c. 1949

Keith was born in Ludington, Michigan. During World War II, he served in the United States Army as an enlisted soldier. He graduated from the United States Military Academy at West Point in 1949 and was commissioned a field artillery second lieutenant. He received his bachelor's degree from the academy and a master's degree from Columbia University in 1958, preceding a faculty assignment at West Point. He received an honorary Doctor of Laws Degree from the University of Akron in 1982.

== Military career ==
Some of Keith's key duty assignments in his active military service were:

- January 1969 to July 1970 – Commander, 36th Artillery Group, United States Army, Europe
- July 1970 to June 1971 – Executive Officer, Office of the Chief of Research and Development, United States Army, Washington, D.C.
- August 1971 to August 1972 – Director, Research and Analysis Directorate, Civil Operations and Revolutionary Development Support, United States Military Assistance Command, Vietnam
- September 1972 to May 1974 – Director of Developments, Office, Chief of Research and Development, United States Army, Washington, D.C.
- May 1974 to October 1976 – Director of Weapon Systems, Office, Deputy Chief of Staff for Research, Development and Acquisition, United States Army, Washington, D.C.
- October 1976 to October 1977 – Commanding General, United States Army Field Artillery School, Fort Sill, Oklahoma
- October 1977 to December 1977 – Acting Deputy Chief of Staff for Research, Development and Acquisition, United States Army, Washington, D.C.
- December 1977 to August 1981 – Deputy Chief of Staff for Research, Development and Acquisition, United States Army, Washington, D.C.
- August 1981 to June 1984 – Commanding General, United States Army Materiel Development and Readiness Command, Alexandria, Virginia

Keith attended the Ground General School, Field Artillery School, Command and General Staff College, Armed Forces Staff College, and Industrial College of the Armed Forces. He was awarded the Army Distinguished Service Medal, the Legion of Merit with two Oak Leaf Clusters, the Bronze Star Medal, the Army Commendation Medal with Oak Leaf Cluster and numerous foreign awards and service ribbons. He retired from military service on 28 June 1984.

== Later life ==
In retirement Keith served as Chairman of the United States Field Artillery Association, from 2002 until shortly before his death, and was succeeded by Jack N. Merritt. He died 9 September 2004. He is buried at Arlington National Cemetery.
