= 4th Field Artillery Regiment =

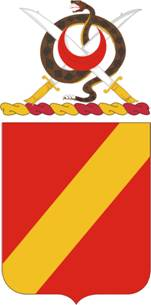
- Coat of arms
- Active: 1907
- Country: United States
- Branch: Army
- Type: Field artillery
- Motto(s): "Nulla Vestigia Retrorsum" (No Step Backward)

Insignia
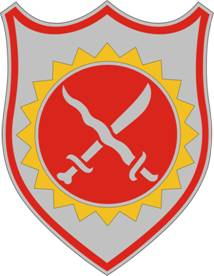
- Distinctive unit insignia

The 4th Field Artillery Regiment is a Field Artillery Branch regiment of the United States Army first formed in 1907.

== History ==
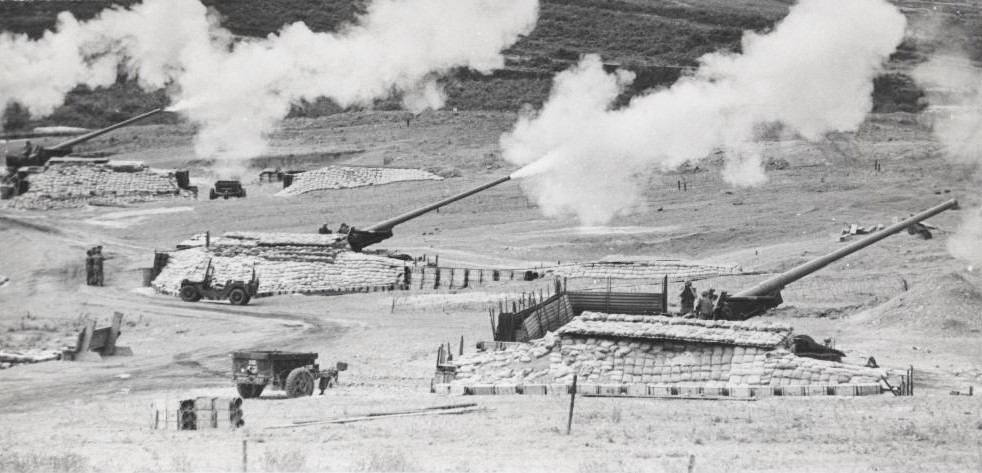
175mm guns of Battery B, 8th Battalion, 4th Artillery Regiment fire in support of Marines near Da Nang in 1968

The 4th Field Artillery Regiment was first activated in 1907 from numbered companies of artillery. It was first organized with two battalions.

== Distinctive unit insignia ==
- Description

A silver color metal and shield device 1 1/4 inches (3.2 cm) in height on which is the Aztec symbol of a red sun surmounted by a silver kris and kampilan saltirewise, the red sun within yellow rays, the shield edged with a red border.

- Symbolism

The crossed kris and kampilan are significant of the service of batteries of the regiment in the Philippines. The Aztec symbol of the sun refers to the service of batteries of the regiment with the Punitive Expeditions in Mexico.

- Background

The distinctive unit insignia was originally approved for the 4th Field Artillery Regiment on 29 September 1923. It was redesignated for the 4th Field Artillery Battalion on 9 August 1941. It was canceled on 21 April 1959. The insignia was reinstated and redesignated for the 4th Field Artillery Regiment effective 1 September 1971.

== Coat of arms ==
- Blazon
  - Shield: Gules, a bend sinister Or.
  - Crest: On a wreath of the colors Or and Gules two kampilans in saltire Argent, hilted Or charged with a crescent Gules a rattlesnake with four rattles entwined with the weapons Proper.
  - Motto: The motto translated "No Step Backward" alludes to the sure-footedness of the mule in mountains, as well as being a good maxim for soldiers.
- Symbolism
  - Shield: The shield is scarlet for Artillery. The bend sinister, an allusion to the hybrid mule, is indicative of the regiment's former service as pack artillery.
  - Crest: The rattlesnake, a device on the arms of Mexico, refers to the Punitive Expeditions into Mexico. The kampilan and crescent commemorate the services of the regiment against the Moros and in Vera Cruz.
- Background: The coat of arms was originally approved for the 4th Field Artillery Regiment on 29 January 1921. It was redesignated for the 4th Field Artillery Battalion on 22 August 1941. It was cancelled on 21 April 1959. The insignia was reinstated and redesignated for the 4th Field Artillery Regiment effective 1 September 1971.

== See also ==
- 4th Air Defense Artillery Regiment - had shared lineage 1 September 1958 – 1 September 1971
