= John E. Sterling Jr. =

United States Army lieutenant general

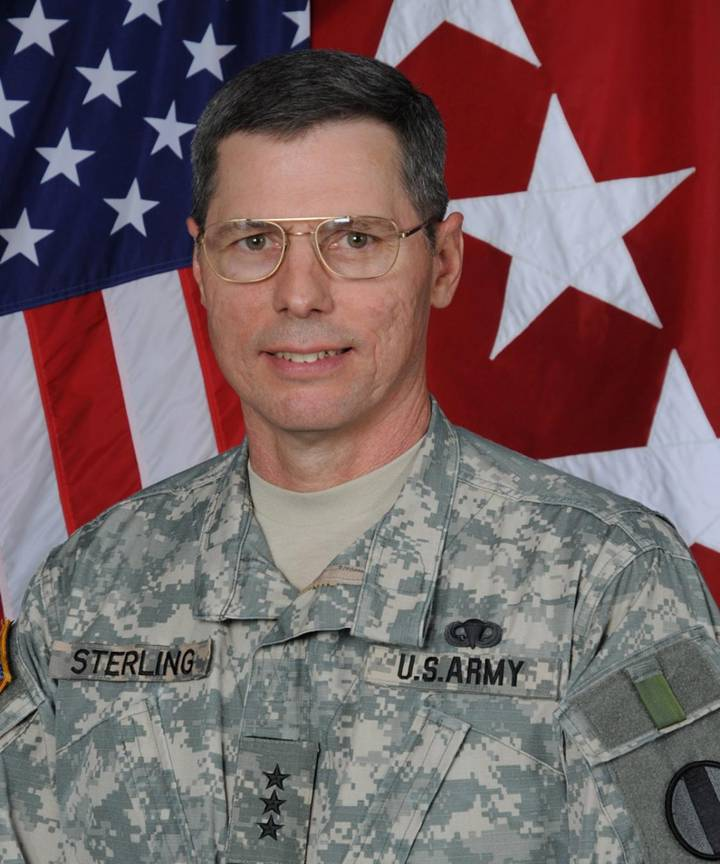
- Lieutenant General Sterling as Deputy TRADOC commander
- Born: December 26, 1953 (age 72); Virginia, United States
- Military career
- Allegiance: United States
- Branch: United States Army
- Service years: 1976–2012
- Rank: Lieutenant General
- Nickname: Jack
- Commands: 18th Theater Army Engineer Brigade
- Conflicts: Iraq War; War in Afghanistan
- Awards: Defense Superior Service Medal; Legion of Merit (4); Bronze Star Medal

John Ember "Jack" Sterling Jr. (born December 26, 1953) is a retired United States Army lieutenant general. He served as Deputy Commander and Chief of Staff for United States Army Training and Doctrine Command (TRADOC) from 2010 to 2012, and was acting commander in 2011. He retired in June 2012.

== Military career ==
Sterling graduated from the United States Military Academy in 1976 and received his commission as a second lieutenant in the Engineer branch. He served in engineer assignments from platoon leader to brigade commander, primarily in the 1st Armored Division, the 5th Infantry Division, and the 3rd Infantry Division.

Other assignments included service as a project officer for Corps of Engineers Baltimore District, working on the Alternate National Military Command and Control Center; Chief of Plans in the G-3 (Operations section), V Corps, in Frankfurt, Germany; and Deputy Chief of the War Plans Division in the Strategy, Plans and Policy Directorate of the Army G-3.

From 2001 to 2003 Sterling served as the Chief of Staff of the 3rd Infantry Division, including the start of combat for Operation Iraqi Freedom. From 2005 to 2006 he served as Deputy Chief of Staff, United States Army Europe and Commander of the 18th Theater Army Engineer Brigade, during which he was reassigned as Deputy Commanding General, Combined Joint Task Force-76 for Operation Enduring Freedom. From 2006 to 2007 Sterling was Assistant Commandant of the United States Army Engineer School at Fort Leonard Wood, Missouri.

Before his assignment as TRADOC's Deputy Commander, Sterling was Assistant Chief of Staff for Operations, (U-3/C-3/J-3) in South Korea, which included providing operational direction for the United Nations Command, Combined Forces Command, United States Forces Korea, and Republic of Korea on the Korean Peninsula. Sterling retired in June 2012.

== Military and civilian education ==
In addition to his Bachelor of Science degree from the United States Military Academy, Sterling holds a master's degree in Civil engineering from the University of Illinois. Sterling is a graduate of the Army Command and General Staff College, the School of Advanced Military Studies (Master in Military Arts and Sciences), and the National War College (Master in National Security Studies).

Sterling is a Registered Professional Engineer in the state of Virginia.

== Awards and decorations ==
Sterling's awards and decorations include the Defense Superior Service Medal; the Legion of Merit (4); Bronze Star Medal; Defense Meritorious Service Medal; Meritorious Service Medal (2); Army Commendation Medal (2); Global War on Terrorism Service Medal; Armed Forces Expeditionary Medal; Armed Forces Service Medal; Iraq Campaign Medal; Afghanistan Campaign Medal; NATO Medal; Parachutist Badge; and Army Staff Badge.

Military offices
Preceded by Martin E. Dempsey	Commanding General, United States Army Training and Doctrine Command; 2011–2011	Succeeded by Robert W. Cone
