= William W. Hartzog =

US Army general

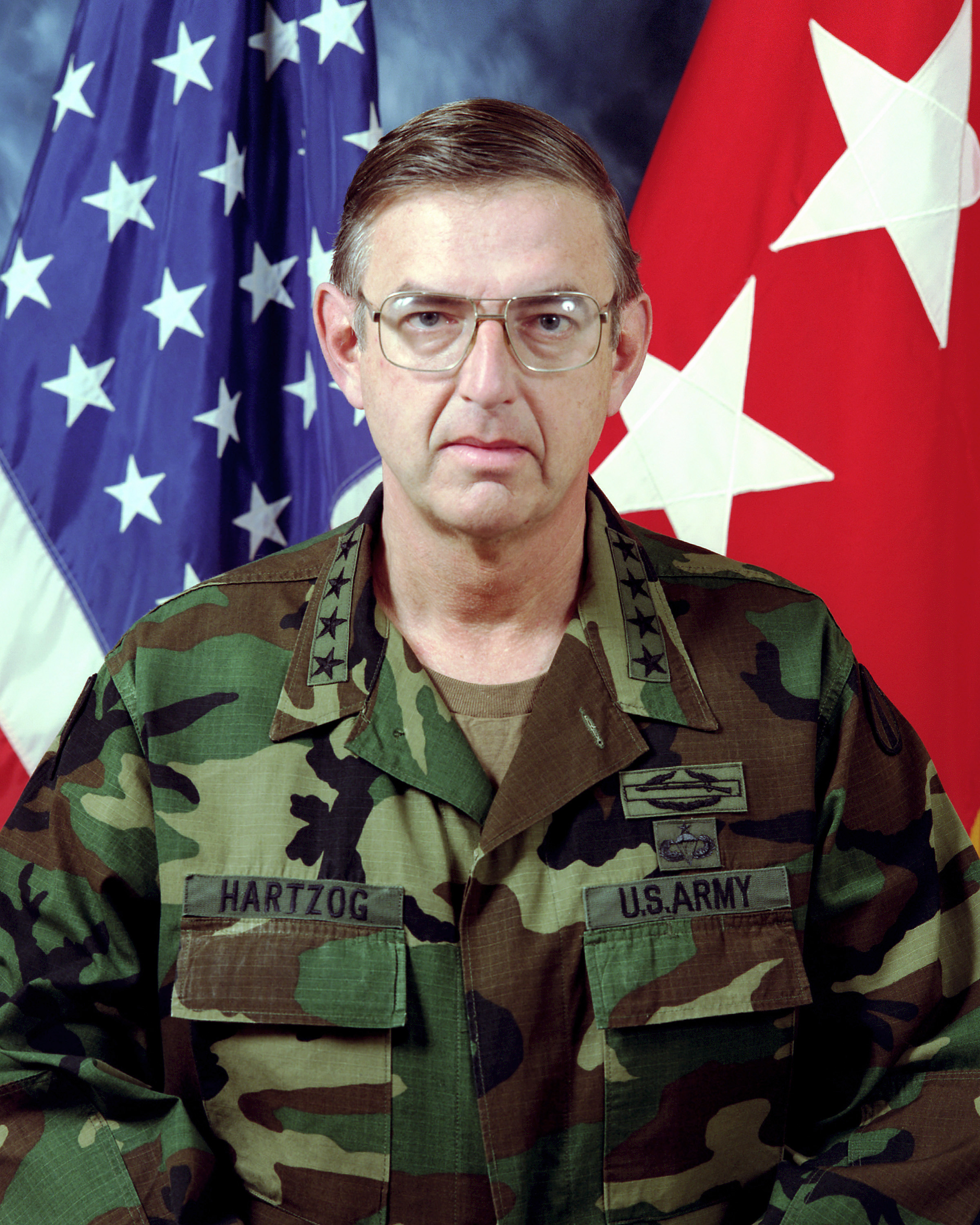
- General William W. Hartzog
- Born: 21 September 1941; Wilmington, North Carolina, U.S.
- Died: 15 October 2020 (aged 79); Potomac, Maryland, U.S.
- Burial place: Arlington National Cemetery
- Military career
- Allegiance: United States
- Branch: United States Army
- Service years: 1963–1998
- Rank: General
- Commands: United States Army Training and Doctrine Command; 1st Infantry Division; United States Army South; 197th Infantry Brigade
- Conflicts: Vietnam War; Operation Just Cause
- Awards: Defense Distinguished Service Medal (2); Army Distinguished Service Medal (2); Legion of Merit (5); Soldier's Medal; Bronze Star Medal (2); Purple Heart
- Other work: CEO, Burdeshaw Associates

William White Hartzog (21 September 1941 – 15 October 2020) was a United States Army General whose commands during his 35-year career include the United States Army Training and Doctrine Command, the 1st Infantry Division, and United States Army South. He was born in Wilmington, North Carolina.

== Military career ==
After graduating from The Citadel in 1963, where he received a degree in English, Hartzog was commissioned in the Infantry. His first assignment after the Infantry Officer Basic Course was as Executive Officer of an Officer Candidate School company at Fort Benning, Georgia In 1965 he was assigned to Fort Kobbe, Panama. He deployed to South Vietnam in 1967, eventually commanding a company, and upon return to the United States he attended the Infantry Officer Advanced Course. After graduation, he was assigned as a tactics instructor at the United States Military Academy, then returned to Vietnam in 1972 as a Plans Officer for Military Assistance Command, Vietnam.

Hartzog attended the United States Marine Corps Command and Staff College from 1973 to 1974, then proceeded to Fort Riley, Kansas where he served in various staff positions with the 1st Infantry Division. In April 1978, he was given command of the 3rd battalion, 5th Infantry, 193rd Infantry Brigade. Following his assignment in Panama, he attended the United States Army War College at Carlisle Barracks, Pennsylvania, and then served at the War Plans Division in Washington D.C., where he eventually became Chief. He was next assigned as Executive Officer at the United States Army Training and Doctrine Command, before taking command of another brigade, the 197th Infantry Brigade at Fort Benning.

Following promotion to brigadier general, Hartzog served from 1987 to 1989 as the Assistant Commandant of the United States Army Infantry School, then returned to Panama for a third time as the J-3, United States Southern Command, a position he held during Operation Just Cause. He took command of United States Army South in 1990, and followed that command in 1991 with command of the 1st Infantry Division. He served as Deputy Commander in Chief/Chief of Staff, United States Atlantic Command from 1993 to 1994 before taking command of United States Army Training and Doctrine Command at Fort Monroe, Virginia from which he retired in 1998.

== Post-military ==
After retiring from the army, Hartzog became CEO of Burdeshaw Associates, a defense consulting firm, sat on the board of directors of the Army Historical Foundation, and was a member of the Defense Science Board. He was given the Appalachian State University Distinguished Alumni Award in 1996. He died in Potomac, Maryland on 15 October 2020.

== Awards and decorations ==
Combat Infantryman Badge
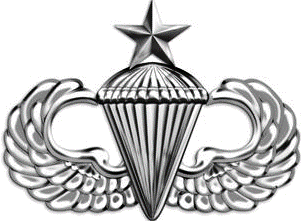
Senior Parachutist Badge
Army Staff Identification Badge

| Defense Distinguished Service Medal with oak leaf cluster |
| Army Distinguished Service Medal with oak leaf cluster |
| Legion of Merit with four oak leaf clusters |
| Soldier's Medal |
| Bronze Star Medal with V Device and oak leaf cluster |
| Purple Heart |
| Meritorious Service Medal with oak leaf cluster |
| Air Medal |
| Joint Service Commendation Medal |
| Army Commendation Medal with three oak leaf clusters |

Military offices
| Preceded by Frederick M. Franks Jr. | Commanding General, United States Army Training and Doctrine Command; 1994–1998 | Succeeded by John N. Abrams |
