= TRADOC Band =

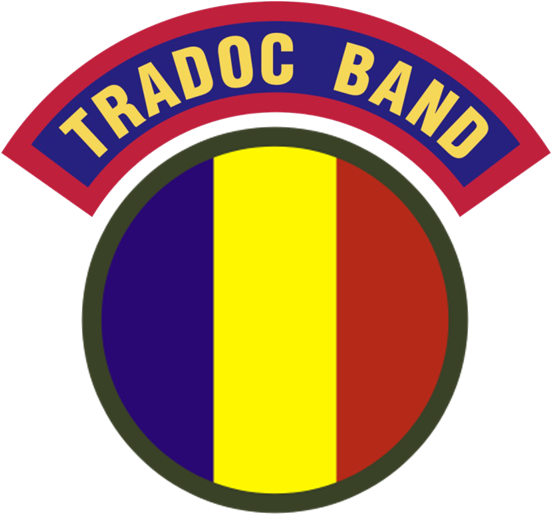
The official band Shoulder Sleeve Insignia and tab.

The Army Training and Doctrine Command Band, also known as the TRADOC Band, was a military band of the United States Army posted at Joint Base Langley–Eustis (located in Newport News, Virginia) and assigned to the United States Army Training and Doctrine Command. It provided official support to the Commanding General, TRADOC. The band was inactivated on June 27th, 2025.

== History ==
The band traces its roots to the Band of 2nd Coast Artillery, which was organized on 30 April 1931 at the Panama Canal Zone. It was later moved to Fort Monroe. Following the Second World War, the Coast Artillery was abolished and the band was re-designated as the 69th Army Ground Forces Band in 1944, being moved to California in May 1946. The 50th Army Ground Forces band was constituted on 18 October 1945 at Fort Meade, Florida. It moved again to Fort Monroe on 14 November 1946, being re-designated as the 50th Army Band a year later. On 24 June 1972, the band was re-designated as the United States Continental Army Band and served under Continental Army Command (CONARC). On 15 February 2006, it was re-designated as the TRADOC Band. Since its transfer in 1946, the band remained on Fort Monroe until June 2011, when it was transferred to Fort Eustis. In 2017, it was reported that the band would be among 6 units to be inactivated within the following two years. After Fort Lee's 392nd Army Band was dissolved in 2019, the remaining soldiers became a separate detachment for the TRADOC Band. On 27 June 2025, the band was inactivated.

== Characteristics ==
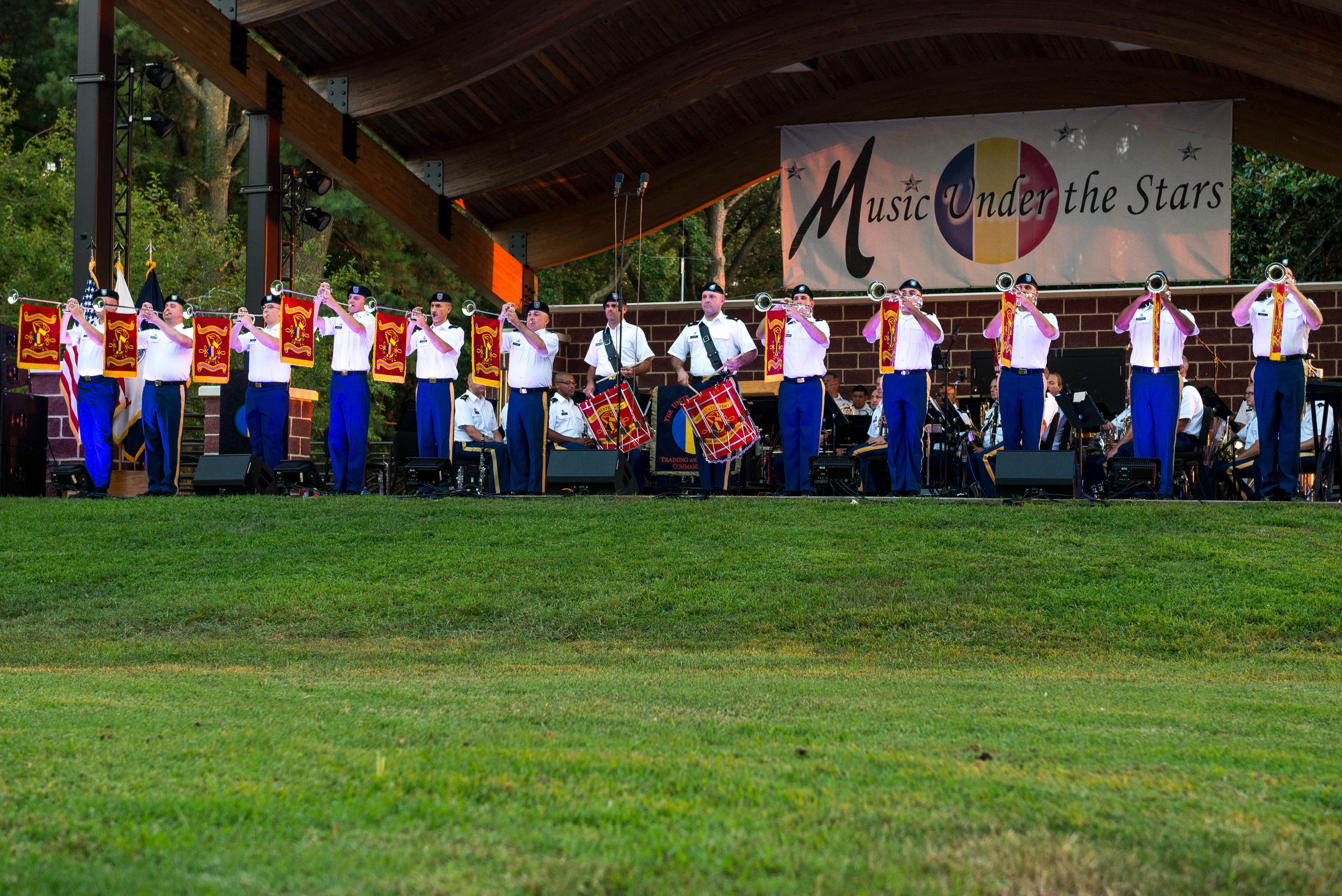
Fanfarists of the TRADOC Band.

=== Decorations ===
- Army Superior Unit Award for 1995-1996
- Army Superior Unit Award for 2011-2012

=== Unit Ensembles ===
- Marching band
- Concert band
- Woodwind Quintet
- Brass Quintet
- Jazz Combo
- Rock Band
