= General Abrams =

General Abrams may refer to:

- Creighton Abrams (1914–1974), U.S. Army four-star general
- John N. Abrams (1946–2018), U.S. Army four-star general
- Robert B. Abrams (born 1960), U.S. Army four-star general
