= John W. Foss =

United States Army general (1933–2020)

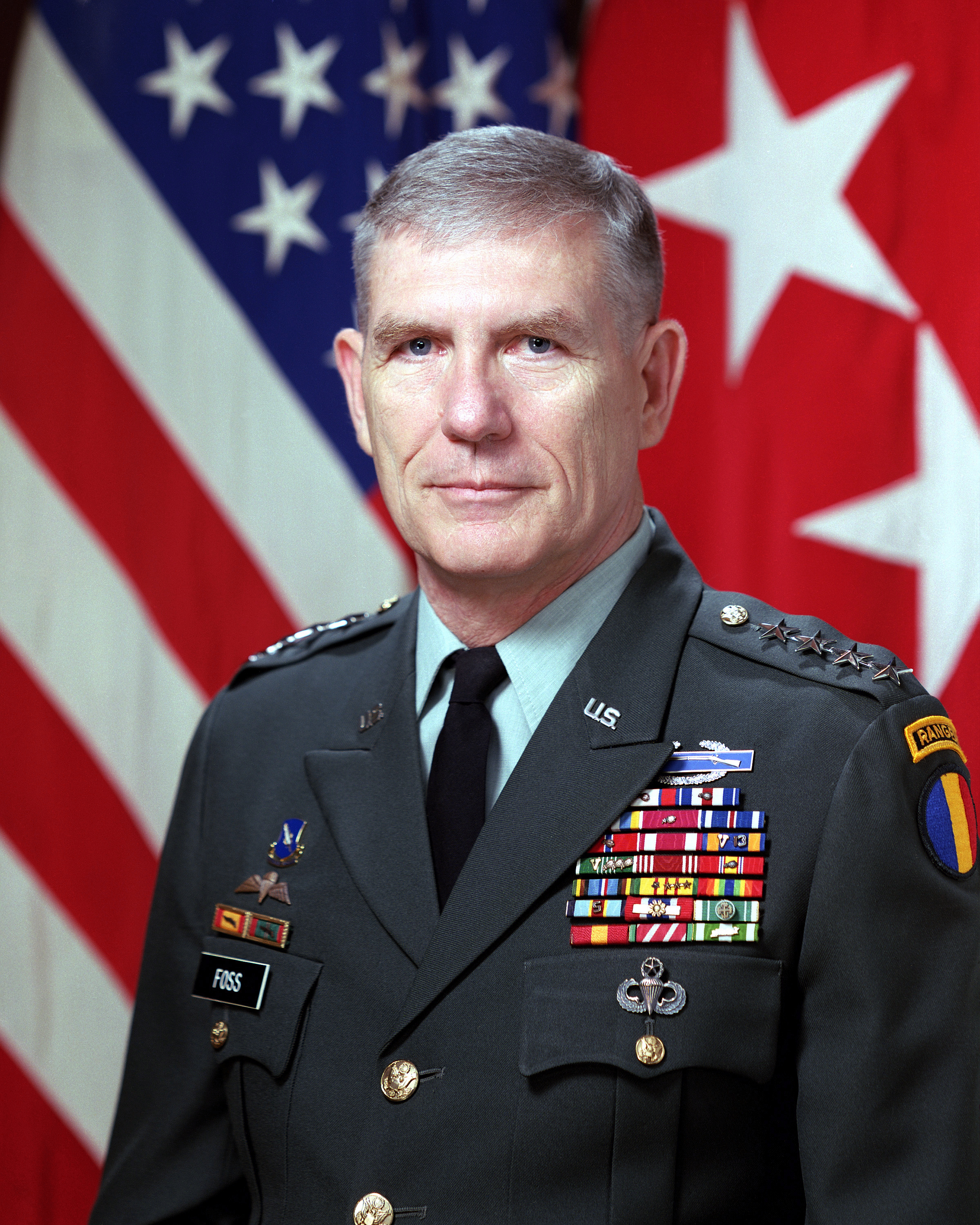
- General John W. Foss
- Born: 13 February 1933; Hutchinson, Minnesota, US
- Died: 25 April 2020 (aged 87); Williamsburg, Virginia, US
- Military career
- Allegiance: United States
- Branch: United States Army
- Service years: 1950–1991
- Rank: General
- Commands: United States Army Training and Doctrine Command; XVIII Airborne Corps; United States Army Infantry School; 82nd Airborne Division; 3d Brigade, 1st Cavalry Division; 3rd Battalion, 12th Infantry Regiment
- Conflicts: Vietnam War
- Awards: Army Distinguished Service Medal (3); Air Force Distinguished Service Medal; Silver Star (2); Defense Superior Service Medal; Legion of Merit (2); Distinguished Flying Cross; Bronze Star Medal (2)

John William Foss (13 February 1933 – 25 April 2020) was a United States Army general, and commander of the United States Army Training and Doctrine Command.

== Military career ==
Foss was born in Hutchinson, Minnesota, on 13 February 1933. He began his military career when he enlisted in the Minnesota National Guard's 136th Infantry Regiment in April 1950. He transferred to active duty as an infantryman in 1951, received an appointment to the United States Military Academy, and was commissioned in the infantry in 1956.

Foss held a variety of command and staff positions. His overseas tours include four in Europe and four in Asia. Foss served as a platoon leader in the 504th and 187th Infantry Regiments in both Germany and Lebanon and commanded a rifle company in the 3rd Battalion, 32nd Infantry in Korea. He also served two combat tours in Vietnam with the 4th Infantry Division as the Operations Officer, 2nd Brigade and as the commander of the 3rd Battalion, 12th Infantry.

Foss' commands include the 3d Brigade, 1st Cavalry Division; the United States Army Infantry School and Fort Benning; the 82nd Airborne Division; the XVIII Airborne Corps and Fort Bragg; and Commanding General, United States Army Training and Doctrine Command (TRADOC).

Foss also served as an instructor at the United States Military Academy; the first exchange instructor at the Royal Military Academy Sandhurst; the G-3 of III Corps; Chief of the Joint Military Advisory Group, Manila, Philippines; Commanding General, Seventh Army Training Command in Germany; the United States Army Chief of Infantry; and the Deputy Chief of Staff for Operations and Plans, Department of the Army.

In addition to a Bachelor of Science degree in engineering, Foss received a Master of Science degree in Public Administration from Shippensburg State College. His awards include the Army Distinguished Service Medal with two Oak Leaf Clusters, the Air Force Distinguished Service Medal, Silver Star with Oak Leaf Cluster, Defense Superior Service Medal, Legion of Merit with Oak Leaf Cluster, and the Distinguished Flying Cross. He also earned the Ranger Tab, Expert Infantryman Badge, Combat Infantryman Badge, the Master Parachutist Badge with over 300 jumps, and the Army Staff Identification and Joint Chiefs of Staff Identification Badges. He was awarded parachute badges from the United Kingdom, Philippines, Honduras, and Egypt. Foss was inducted into the Ranger Hall of Fame in 1995.

=== Awards and decorations ===
U.S. military individual decorations
Army Distinguished Service Medal (with two oak leaf clusters)
Air Force Distinguished Service Medal
Silver Star (with one oak leaf cluster)
Defense Superior Service Medal
Legion of Merit (with one oak leaf cluster)
Distinguished Flying Cross
Bronze Star (with one oak leaf cluster)
Meritorious Service Medal
Air Medal (with V Device and award numeral 13)
Army Commendation Medal (with "V" Device and three oak leaf clusters)
Army Good Conduct Medal
U.S. campaign and service decorations
National Defense Service Medal (with oak leaf cluster)
Armed Forces Expeditionary Medal
Vietnam Service Medal (with four service stars)
Army Service Ribbon
Overseas Service Ribbon (with award numeral 5)
Foreign individual decorations
Philippine Legion of Honor, Chief Commander
Outstanding Achievement Medal, Philippines
Order of Military Merit (Brazil), Grand Cross
Republic of Vietnam Staff Service Medal First Class
Republic of Vietnam Campaign Medal
Foreign unit awards
Republic of Vietnam Gallantry Cross Unit Citation
Republic of Vietnam Civil Actions Medal Unit Citation

U.S. badges, patches and tabs
Combat Infantry Badge
Expert Infantryman Badge
Master Master Parachutist Badge
Army Staff Identification Badge
Office of the Joint Chiefs of Staff Identification Badge
504th Infantry Regiment Distinctive Unit Insignia
Ranger tab
Foreign badges
British Army Parachutist Badge
Armed Forces of the Philippines Parachutist Badge
Honduran Parachutist Badge
Egypt Parachutist Badge

== Post military ==
Foss retired from the army on 1 September 1991, and lived in Williamsburg, Virginia. In retirement Foss had been Chairman of the Commission on the United States Army Reserve Command, served as a consultant to various defense industries, been on the Board of Advisors to both the Jewish Institute for National Security Affairs and the National Infantry Foundation, Senior Mentor to Senior Joint Warfighting Course, Armed Forces Staff College and was a Senior Fellow of the Institute of Land Warfare of the Association of the United States Army. In 1995 he was inducted to the US Army Ranger Hall of Fame. In September 2009, Foss was awarded the Doughboy Award by the National Infantry Association. In May 2013, Foss was selected and awarded as a Distinguished Graduate at West Point.

== Personal ==
Last resided in Williamsburg, Virginia. His wife Gloria died of cancer 26 June 2014, and was interred at Arlington National Cemetery on 12 August 2014. He had three children, John W. Foss Jr., Kevin Mark Foss and Julia M. Foss Dunn. Through their daughter Julia, Foss has three grandchildren: Bryana, Kyla and Brady Dunn.

Foss died on 25 April 2020, at the age of 87. He was interred with his wife at Arlington National Cemetery on 22 October 2020.

Military offices
Preceded by Maxwell R. Thurman	Commanding General, United States Army Training and Doctrine Command; 1989—1991	Succeeded by Frederick M. Franks, Jr.
