= Anthony R. Jones =

US Army general

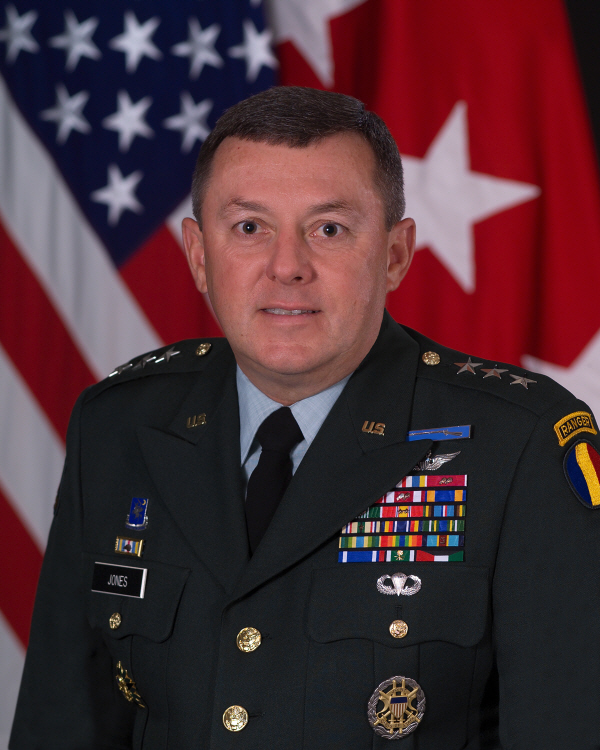
- Born: July 10, 1948 (age 78)
- Military career
- Allegiance: United States
- Branch: United States Army
- Service years: 1970–2005
- Rank: Lieutenant General
- Commands: United States Army Aviation Center; Fort Rucker; Combat Aviation Brigade, 24th Infantry Division; 3rd Battalion, 227th Aviation Regiment
- Conflicts: Gulf War
- Awards: Army Distinguished Service Medal; Defense Superior Service Medal; Legion of Merit (3); Bronze Star Medal

Anthony Ray Jones (born July 10, 1948) is a retired United States Army lieutenant general who served as acting commander of the United States Army Training and Doctrine Command.

== Early life ==
A native of Washington, Indiana, Jones graduated from Indiana University Bloomington in June 1970 and was a Reserve Officer Training Corps Distinguished Military Graduate.

== Military career ==
Commissioned a second lieutenant of Infantry, Jones later became qualified in the Aviation branch. His early assignments included: Task Force Executive Officer and Company Commander, 160th Aviation Group (Airborne), 1st Special Operations Command; Commander, 3rd Battalion, 227th Aviation Regiment, 3rd Armored Division; Commander, Combat Aviation Brigade, 24th Infantry Division; Chief of Staff, 24th Infantry Division (Mechanized); and deputy director for Operations, National Military Command Center, J-3, The Joint Staff. Jones's overseas experience included Operation Desert Shield and Operation Desert Storm in Saudi Arabia, as well as Operation Joint Guard in Bosnia.

Jones's later assignments included: Assistant Division Commander (Forward), 1st Armored Division; Commanding General, United States Army Aviation Center and Fort Rucker; and Chief of Staff, United States Army Europe and Seventh Army.

Jones's final assignment was as Deputy Commander of United States Army Training and Doctrine Command. In 2004 Jones co-led an inquiry into alleged detainee abuse in Iraq by members of United States military intelligence. He served as acting TRADOC commander after General Kevin P. Byrnes was relieved of duty in 2005.

== Education ==
Jones graduated from the Infantry Officer Basic and Advanced Courses, the United States Army Command and General Staff College, and the United States Army War College. He holds a master's degree in Systems Management from the University of Southern California.

== Post-military career ==
After leaving the army, Jones worked as Vice President of Training Systems and Services for the Boeing Company.

In 2011 Jones was inducted into the Army Aviation Hall of Fame.

== Awards and decorations ==
Jones's awards and decorations include the following:

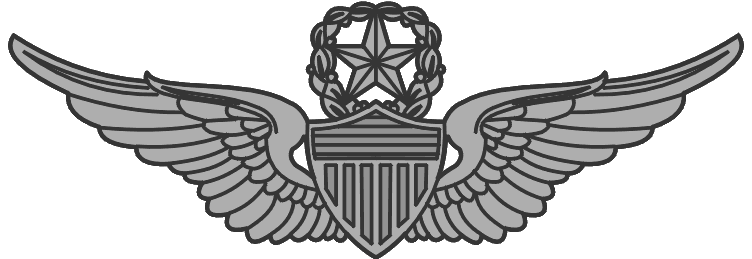

| Badge | Expert Infantryman Badge | | |
| Badge | U.S. Army Master Aviator Badge | | |
| 1st row | Army Distinguished Service Medal | Defense Superior Service Medal | Legion of Merit with 2 Oak leaf clusters (3 awards) |
| 2nd row | Bronze Star | Meritorious Service Medal with 1 silver and 1 bronze Oak leaf clusters (7 awards) | Air Medal |
| 3rd row | Army Commendation Medal with 1 bronze Oak leaf cluster (2 awards) | National Defense Service Medal with 2 Service stars | Armed Forces Expeditionary Medal |
| 4th row | Southwest Asia Service Medal with 1 Campaign star | Global War on Terrorism Service Medal | Korea Defense Service Medal |
| 5th row | Armed Forces Service Medal | Army Service Ribbon | Army Overseas Service Ribbon |
| 6th row | NATO Medal for ex-Yugoslavia | Kuwait Liberation Medal (Saudi Arabia) | Kuwait Liberation Medal (Kuwait) |
| Badges | Army Staff Identification Badge | Parachutist Badge | Ranger Tab |

Military offices
| Preceded by Kevin P. Byrnes | Commanding General, United States Army Training and Doctrine Command; 2005 | Succeeded by William S. Wallace |
