= Robert Brooks Brown =

U.S. army general (born 1959)

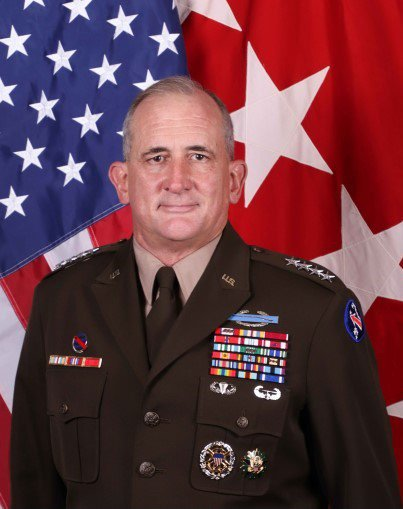
- Official portrait, 2019
- Born: 14 April 1959 (age 67); Pennsylvania, U.S.
- Military career
- Allegiance: United States
- Branch: United States Army
- Service years: 1981–2019
- Rank: General
- Commands: United States Army Pacific; United States Army Combined Arms Center; I Corps; 1st Brigade Combat Team, 25th Infantry Division
- Conflicts: Iraq War
- Awards: Army Distinguished Service Medal (4); Defense Superior Service Medal; Legion of Merit; Bronze Star Medal (2)

Robert Brooks Brown (born 14 April 1959) is a retired United States Army general who served as commander of the United States Army Pacific. He now serves as president of the Association of the United States Army since 30 September 2021, having joined the organization as executive vice president in January 2021.

== Early life and education ==
Brown was born on 14 April 1959 in Pennsylvania. He graduated from Grosse Pointe North High School in Grosse Pointe, Michigan in 1977. He was commissioned into the United States Army as an Infantry Officer, upon graduating from the United States Military Academy in May 1981. While at West Point, he played for the Army Black Knights men's basketball team under coach Mike Krzyzewski and was a 1,000-point scorer for the Black Knights. Brown remains close to the coach and even spoke at a USA Basketball camp in Las Vegas, Nevada prior to the 2008 Olympics.

Brown received a Master of Education degree at the University of Virginia and a Master of Science in National Security and Strategic Studies from the National Defense University.

== Military career ==
From June 2003 to December 2005, Brown commanded the 1st Brigade Combat Team (BCT), 25th Infantry Division at Joint Base Lewis–McChord. The 1st BCT, 25th Infantry Division, a Stryker unit, was deployed to Mosul, Iraq from September 2004 to September 2005. Brown led the unit through combat operations and the first elections in a post-Saddam Hussein Iraq.

From February 2014 to April 2016, Brown was the commanding general United States Army Combined Arms Center headquartered at Fort Leavenworth.

From 2012 to 2014, Brown was the commanding general of the I Corps headquartered at Joint Base Lewis–McChord.

Brown was serving as commander of the United States Army Pacific until his retirement was announced in September 2019, United States Indo-Pacific Command (USINDOPACOM) bid farewell to him on 9 October, and the general officially retired on 1 November 2019.

== Awards and decorations ==
Combat Infantryman Badge
Expert Infantryman Badge
Basic Parachutist Badge
Air Assault Badge
Joint Chiefs of Staff Identification Badge
Army Staff Identification Badge
25th Infantry Division Combat Service Identification Badge
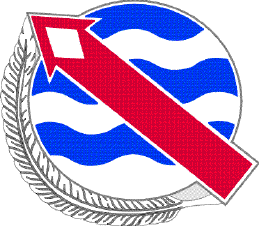
United States Army Pacific Distinctive Unit Insignia
4 Overseas Service Bars

Army Distinguished Service Medal with three bronze oak leaf clusters
Defense Superior Service Medal
Legion of Merit
Bronze Star Medal with oak leaf cluster
Defense Meritorious Service Medal
Meritorious Service Medal with oak leaf cluster
Joint Service Commendation Medal
Army Commendation Medal with three oak leaf clusters
Army Achievement Medal
Joint Meritorious Unit Award
Valorous Unit Award
Meritorious Unit Commendation
National Defense Service Medal with one bronze service star
Armed Forces Expeditionary Medal with one service star
Iraq Campaign Medal with three service stars
Global War on Terrorism Expeditionary Medal
Global War on Terrorism Service Medal
Humanitarian Service Medal
Army Service Ribbon
Army Overseas Service Ribbon
NATO Medal for Former Yugoslavia

Military offices
Preceded by David G. Perkins	Commandant of the United States Army Command and General Staff College; 2014–2016	Succeeded by Michael D. Lundy
Preceded by Vincent K. Brooks	Commander of the United States Army Pacific; 2016–2019	Succeeded by Paul LaCamera
