= Martin Dempsey =

18th Chairman of the Joint Chiefs of Staff and 37th Chief of Staff of the Army

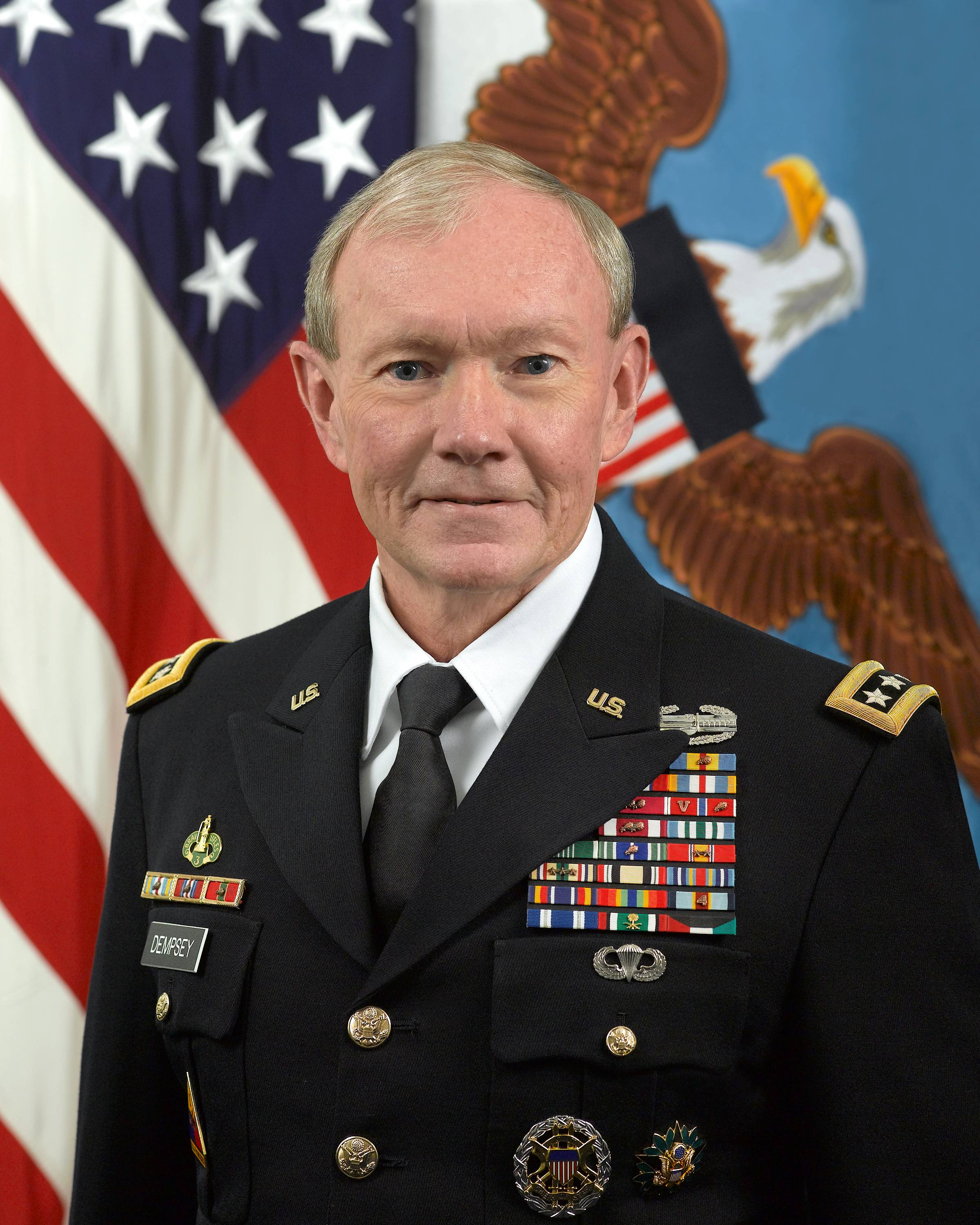
- Official portrait, 2012
- Born: Martin Edward Dempsey; 14 March 1952 (age 74); Jersey City, New Jersey, U.S.
- Education: United States Military Academy (BS); Duke University (MA); United States Army Command and General Staff College (MMAS); Naval War College (MS)
- Military career
- Allegiance: United States
- Branch: United States Army
- Service years: 1974–2015
- Rank: General
- Nickname: Marty
- Commands: Chairman of the Joint Chiefs of Staff; Chief of Staff of the United States Army; United States Army Training and Doctrine Command; United States Central Command; Multi-National Security Transition Command – Iraq; 1st Armored Division; 3rd Armored Cavalry Regiment
- Conflicts: Gulf War; Iraq War
- Awards: Defense Distinguished Service Medal (3); Army Distinguished Service Medal (6); Navy Distinguished Service Medal; Air Force Distinguished Service Medal; Coast Guard Distinguished Service Medal; Defense Superior Service Medal; Legion of Merit (3); Bronze Star Medal (2) with valor
- Dempsey's voice Dempsey on the differences between Syria and Libya at a Senate Armed Services Committee hearing on the Syrian civil war. Recorded March 7, 2012
- Website: Official website

Martin Edward Dempsey (born 14 March 1952) is an American retired military officer who served as the 18th chairman of the Joint Chiefs of Staff from October 2011 to September 2015. He previously served as the 37th chief of Staff of the Army from April to September 2011. Before that, he served as Commanding General, U.S. Army Training and Doctrine Command, from December 2008 to April 2011, as acting commander, U.S. Central Command, from March to October 2008, as deputy commander, U.S. Central Command, from August 2007 to March 2008, and as commanding general, Multi-National Security Transition Command – Iraq (MNSTC-I), from August 2005 to August 2007.

Dempsey assumed his assignment as Chairman of the Joint Chiefs of Staff in October 2011, and stepped down from the chairmanship in September 2015. He has served as a professor at Duke University and as chairman of USA Basketball.

== Early life ==
Dempsey was born on 14 March 1952, in Jersey City, New Jersey, and grew up in nearby Bayonne. He attended John S. Burke Catholic High School in Goshen, New York. Dempsey is Irish American. Following high school, Dempsey attended the United States Military Academy at West Point and graduated with the Class of 1974. Dempsey's four grandparents were born in the counties of Sligo, Donegal, Mayo and Roscommon in Ireland. He learned a small amount of the Irish language while spending his summers in Ireland as a child.

== Career ==
Dempsey received a commission as an Armor officer upon graduation from the United States Military Academy in 1974. As a company-grade officer, he served in 1st Squadron, 2nd Armored Cavalry Regiment as a platoon leader in B Troop, support platoon, S4 and the officer in charge for personnel. As a captain, Dempsey was the commanding officer of Alpha Troop, 1/10 Armored Cavalry at Ft. Carson, Colorado. He went on to be the executive officer of the 3rd Brigade 3rd Armored Division during Operation Desert Shield/Storm. As a lieutenant colonel he commanded the 4th Battalion of the 67th Armored Regiment "Bandits" from 1992 to 1995 in the 1st Armored Division in Friedberg, Hesse, Germany.

In 1996 he took command of the 3rd Armored Cavalry Regiment. Following that assignment as the Army's “senior scout,” he served as an assistant deputy director for strategic plans and policy (J-5) on the Joint Staff, and as special assistant to the chairman of the Joint Chiefs of Staff, General Henry H. Shelton, USA. During this period of his career, he attended both the Army Command and General Staff College and the National War College, earning master's degrees in military art and national strategic studies.

Promoted to brigadier general in August 2001, Dempsey first served in the Kingdom of Saudi Arabia training and advising the Saudi Arabian National Guard.

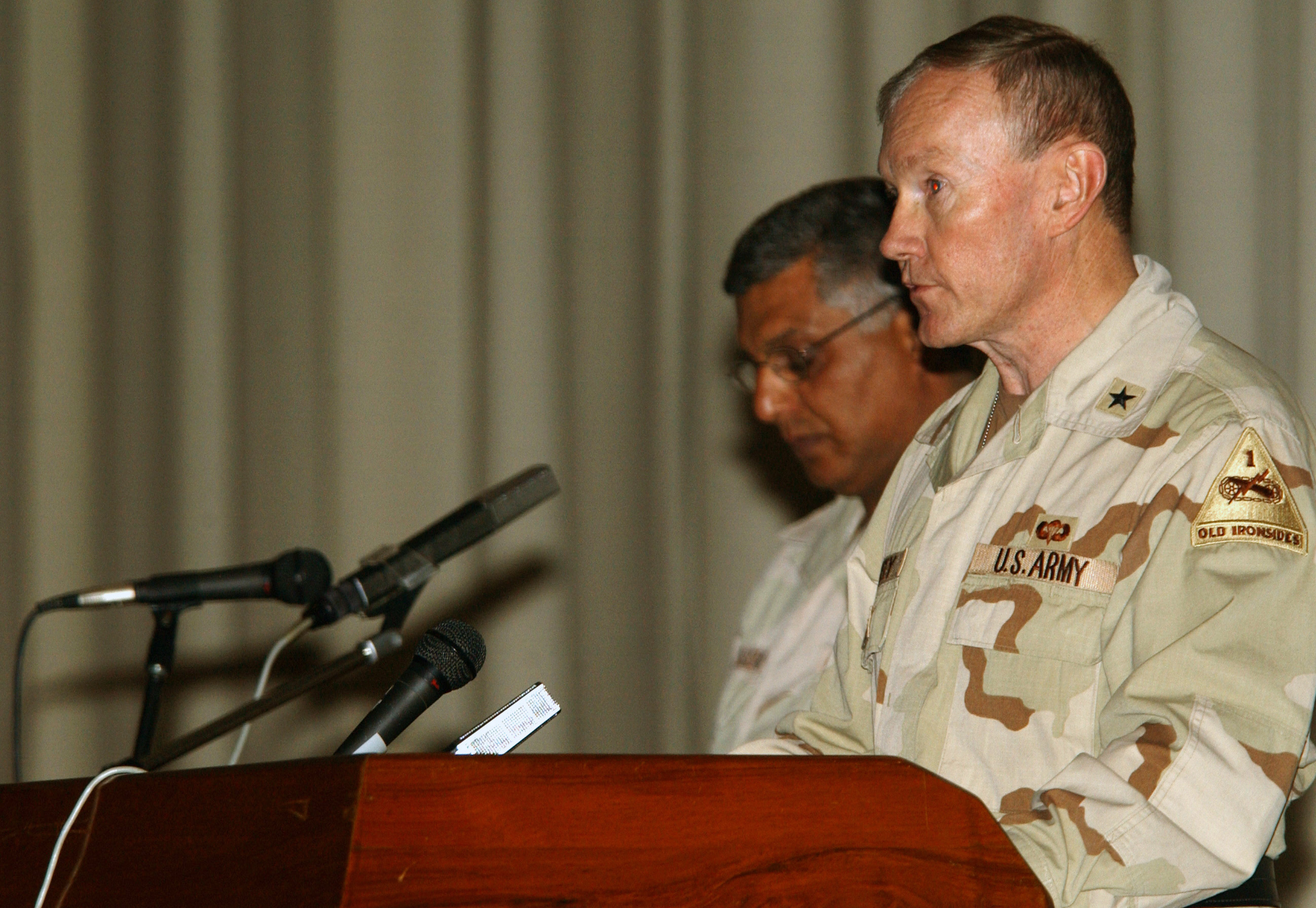
Brigadier General Dempsey, commander, 1st Armored Division, gives a few remarks to the Iraqis who served during previous wars in Iraq at a recognition ceremony held in the Convention Center in Baghdad, Iraq, during Operation Iraqi Freedom in 2004

In June 2003, then Major General Dempsey assumed command of the 1st Armored Division. He succeeded Ricardo S. Sanchez who was promoted to lieutenant general, as commander of V Corps. Dempsey's command of the 1st Armored Division lasted until July 2005 and included 13 months in Iraq, from June 2003 to July 2004. While in Iraq, 1st Armored Division, in addition to its own brigades, had operational command over the 2nd Armored Cavalry Regiment and a brigade of the 82nd Airborne Division; the command, called "Task Force Iron" in recognition of the Division's nickname, "Old Ironsides", was the largest division-level command in the history of the United States Army.

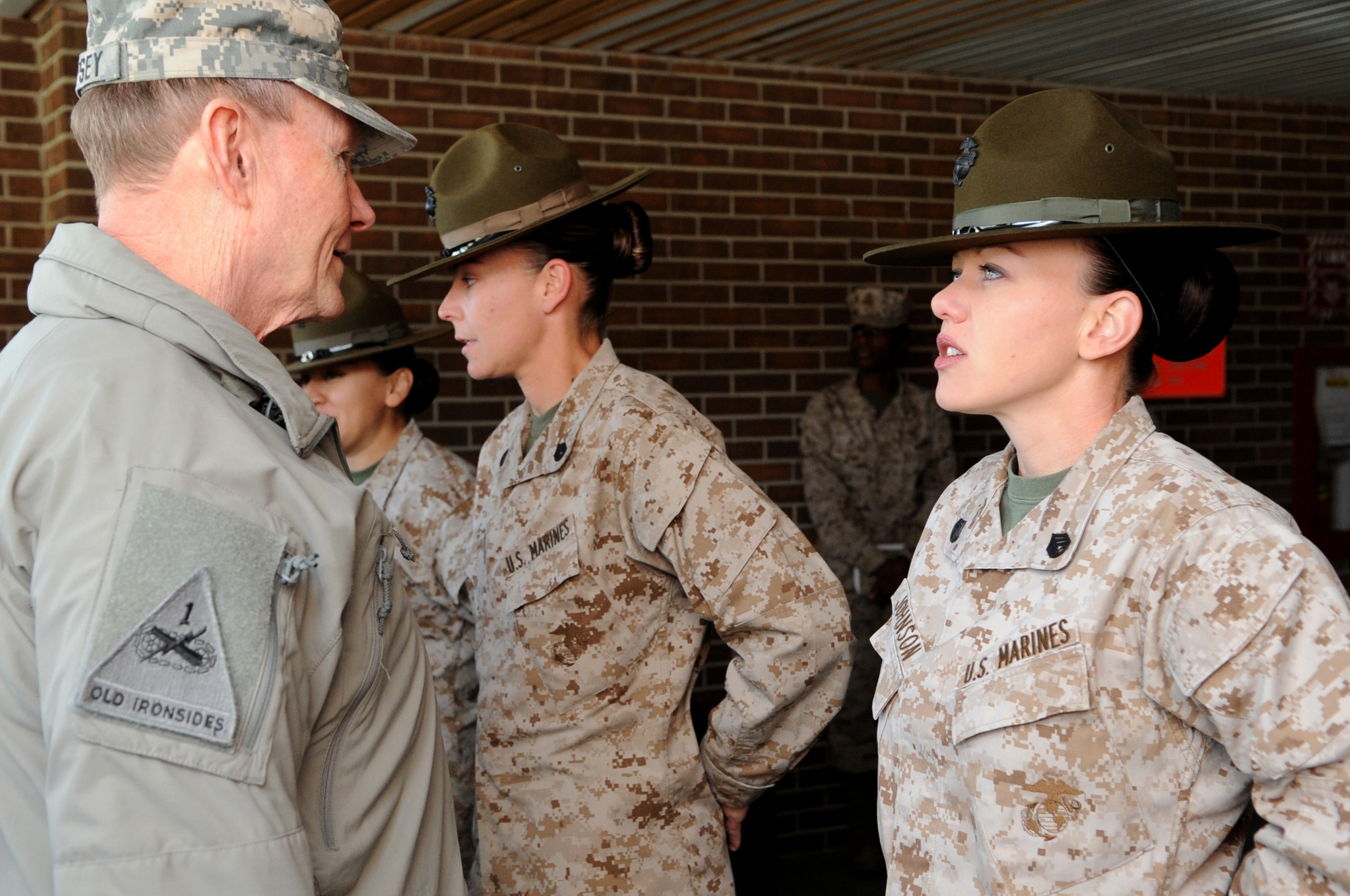
Dempsey talks with U.S. Marine Corps drill instructors in March 2013

It was during this time that the U.S. intervention in Iraq changed dramatically as Fallujah fell to Sunni extremists and supporters of Muqtada al-Sadr built their strength and rose against American forces. Then Major General Dempsey and his command assumed responsibility for the area of operations in Baghdad as the insurgency incubated, grew, and exploded. General Dempsey has been described by Thomas Ricks in his book "Fiasco": "In the capital itself, the 1st Armored Division, after Sanchez assumed control of V Corps, was led by Maj. Gen. Martin Dempsey, was generally seen as handling a difficult (and inherited) job well, under the global spotlight of Baghdad."

On 27 March 2007, Lieutenant General Dempsey was transferred from commander of Multi-National Security Transition Command-Iraq, and reassigned as deputy commander of U.S. Central Command at MacDill Air Force Base, Florida.

On 5 February 2008, Dempsey was nominated to head the U.S. Army, Europe/Seventh Army, and was nominated for promotion to four-star general upon Senate approval.

On 11 March 2008, Dempsey's commander, Admiral William J. Fallon, resigned from his post as commander of Central Command. U.S. Secretary of Defense Robert Gates accepted this as effective on March 31. Dempsey temporarily took over as acting commander.

On 13 March 2008, Dempsey was confirmed by the United States Senate as commander, U.S. Army, Europe/Seventh Army. However, due, to Admiral Fallon's unexpected retirement, Dempsey never took command of U.S. Army, Europe/Seventh Army.

On 11 July 2008, Dempsey was nominated to take command of U.S. Army Training and Doctrine Command while Lieutenant General Carter F. Ham replaced his nomination to command the U.S. Army, Europe/Seventh Army.

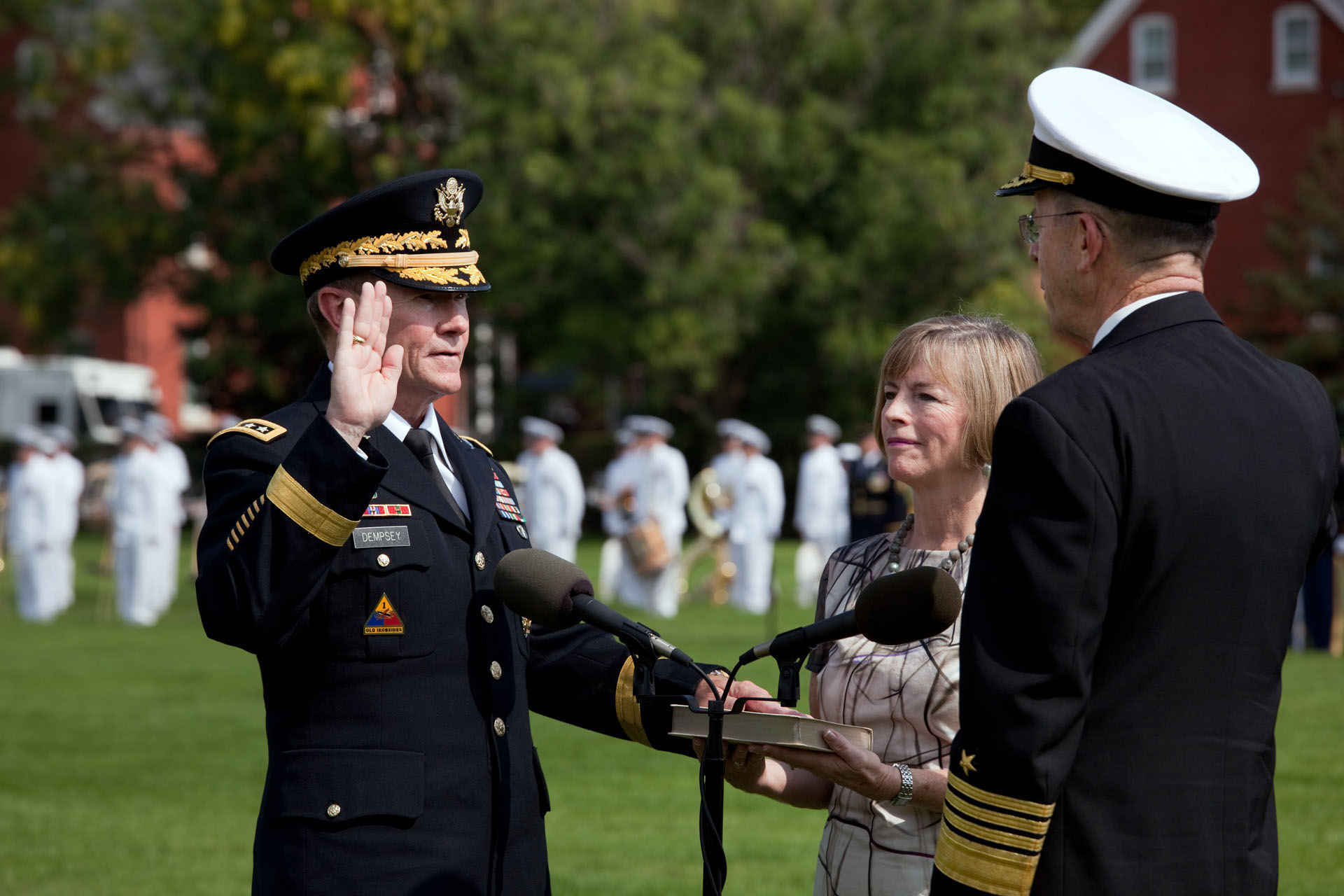
Retiring Chairman of the Joint Chiefs of Staff Admiral Mike Mullen, right, administers the oath of office to his successor, General Dempsey, left, during the change of office and swearing-in ceremony at Joint Base Myer-Henderson Hall in Arlington, Virginia, 30 September 2011

On 8 December 2008, Dempsey assumed command of United States Army Training and Doctrine Command.

On 6 January 2011, Defense Secretary Robert Gates announced that he would recommend that the president nominate General Dempsey to succeed General George Casey as the Army Chief of Staff. On 8 February 2011, Gates announced that President Barack Obama nominated Dempsey to be the 37th chief of Staff of the United States Army. On 3 March 2011, Dempsey testified before the United States Senate Committee on Armed Services, and on 15 March 2011, the committee affirmatively reported Dempsey's nomination. On 16 March 2011, the Senate confirmed Dempsey's nomination by unanimous consent. On 11 April 2011, Dempsey was sworn in as Chief of Staff of the United States Army at a ceremony at Fort Myer.

With Admiral Michael Mullen set to retire as Chairman of the Joint Chiefs of Staff in September 2011, U.S. President Obama needed to select his replacement. The vice-chairman, Marine General James Cartwright, who was initially believed to be the front runner for the job, had fallen out of favor among senior officials in the Defense Department. Obama administration officials revealed on 26 May 2011, that Obama would nominate Dempsey to the post of chairman. In August 2011, General Dempsey was confirmed by unanimous consent to succeed Admiral Mike Mullen as the next chairman of the Joint Chiefs of Staff. He was sworn in as 18th chairman of the Joint Chiefs of Staff on 1 October 2011. On 26 June 2013, Obama re-nominated General Dempsey to serve a second two-year term as chairman. Dempsey stepped down on 25 September 2015, and was replaced by General Joseph Dunford, USMC.

Dempsey was appointed as the chairman of USA Basketball in 2016. After eight years in the position, he was re-elected as chair in October 2024 through to the 2028 Los Angeles Olympics.

On 18 October 2020, Dempsey was inducted into the New Jersey Hall of Fame, in the Public Service category.

== Personal life ==
Dempsey is married to his high school sweetheart, Deanie. They have three children: Chris, Megan, and Caitlin. Each has served in the United States Army and is married with three children. Chris remains on active duty as a cavalry colonel. Martin and Deanie have nine grandchildren.

== Education ==
- 1974 Bachelor of Science degree, U.S. Military Academy, West Point, New York
- 1984 Master of Arts degree in English, Duke University, Durham, North Carolina
- 1988 Master of Military Art and Science degree, United States Army Command and General Staff College
- 1995 Master of Science degree in national security and strategic studies, National War College

== Dates of rank ==
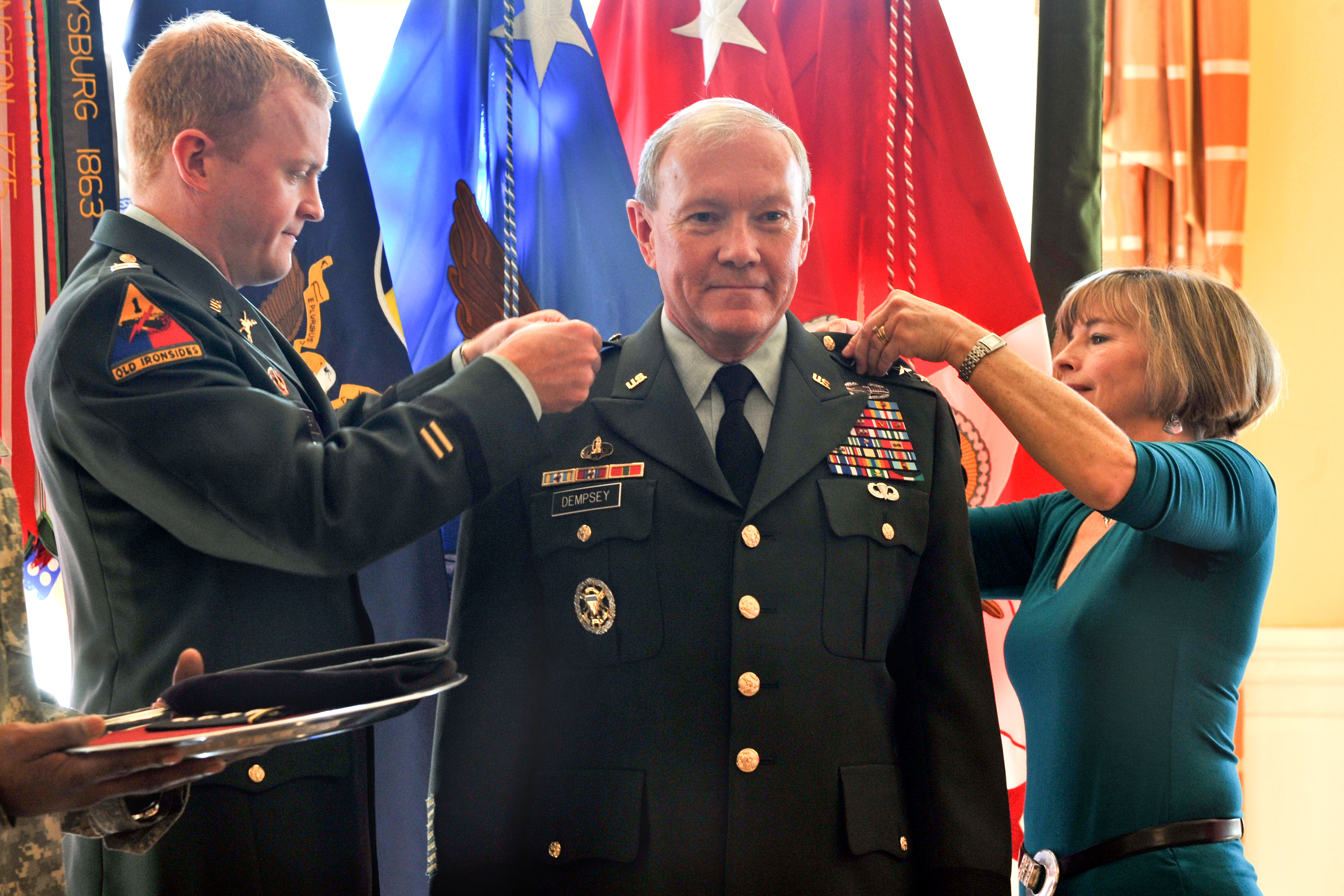
Martin Dempsey's wife Deanie, right, and son, Captain Chris Dempsey, add the new four-star rank insignia to his uniform during his promotion ceremony on Fort Monroe, Virginia, 8 December 2008

Rank	Date
Second lieutenant	5 June 1974
First lieutenant	5 June 1976
Captain	8 August 1978
Major	1 September 1985
Lieutenant colonel	1 April 1991
Colonel	1 September 1996
Brigadier general	1 August 2001
Major general	1 September 2004
Lieutenant general	8 September 2005
General	8 December 2008

== Awards and decorations ==
On 7 December 2011, Dempsey received the USO's Distinguished Service Award on behalf of all military members. In October 2016, he was made an honorary Knight Commander of the Order of the British Empire by Queen Elizabeth II, for commitment to British-American defense cooperation. Also, the Association of the United States Army, on 17 October 2019, awarded Dempsey the George Catlett Marshall Medal for distinguished public service, that organization's highest award.

=== Medals and ribbons ===
U.S. military decorations
Defense Distinguished Service Medal (with two bronze oak leaf clusters)
Army Distinguished Service Medal (with one silver oak leaf cluster)
Navy Distinguished Service Medal
Air Force Distinguished Service Medal
Coast Guard Distinguished Service Medal
Defense Superior Service Medal
Legion of Merit (with two bronze oak leaf clusters)
Bronze Star (with Valor device and bronze oak leaf cluster)
Meritorious Service Medal (with two bronze oak leaf clusters)
Joint Service Commendation Medal
Army Commendation Medal
Army Achievement Medal (with bronze oak leaf cluster)
U.S. unit awards
Joint Meritorious Unit Award (with three bronze oak leaf clusters)
Valorous Unit Award (with bronze oak leaf cluster)
Army Superior Unit Award (with bronze oak leaf cluster)
U.S. service (and campaign) medals and service and training ribbons
National Defense Service Medal (with two bronze service stars)
Southwest Asia Service Medal (with three bronze service stars)
Iraq Campaign Medal (with three bronze service stars)
Global War on Terrorism Expeditionary Medal
Global War on Terrorism Service Medal
Army Service Ribbon
Army Overseas Service Ribbon (with award numeral "4")
Foreign awards
NATO Medal for the former Yugoslavia
Croatian Order of Duke Trpimir
Commander of the French Légion d'honneur
Order of Merit of the Federal Republic of Germany Knight Commander's Cross
Israeli Defense Forces' Chief of Staff Medal of Appreciation
Order of National Security Merit, Tong-il Medal (Republic of Korea)
Knight Grand Cross of the Order of the Crown of Thailand (Thailand)
Knight Commander of the Order of the British Empire (KBE) (Military Division)
Kuwait Liberation Medal (Saudi Arabia)
Kuwait Liberation Medal (Kuwait)
Grand Cordon of the Order of the Rising Sun （Japan）

Other accoutrements
Combat Action Badge
Basic Parachutist Badge
Office of the Joint Chiefs of Staff Identification Badge
Army Staff Identification Badge
1st Armored Division Combat Service Identification Badge
3rd Armored Cavalry Regiment Distinctive Unit Insignia
7 Overseas Service Bars

== Bibliography ==
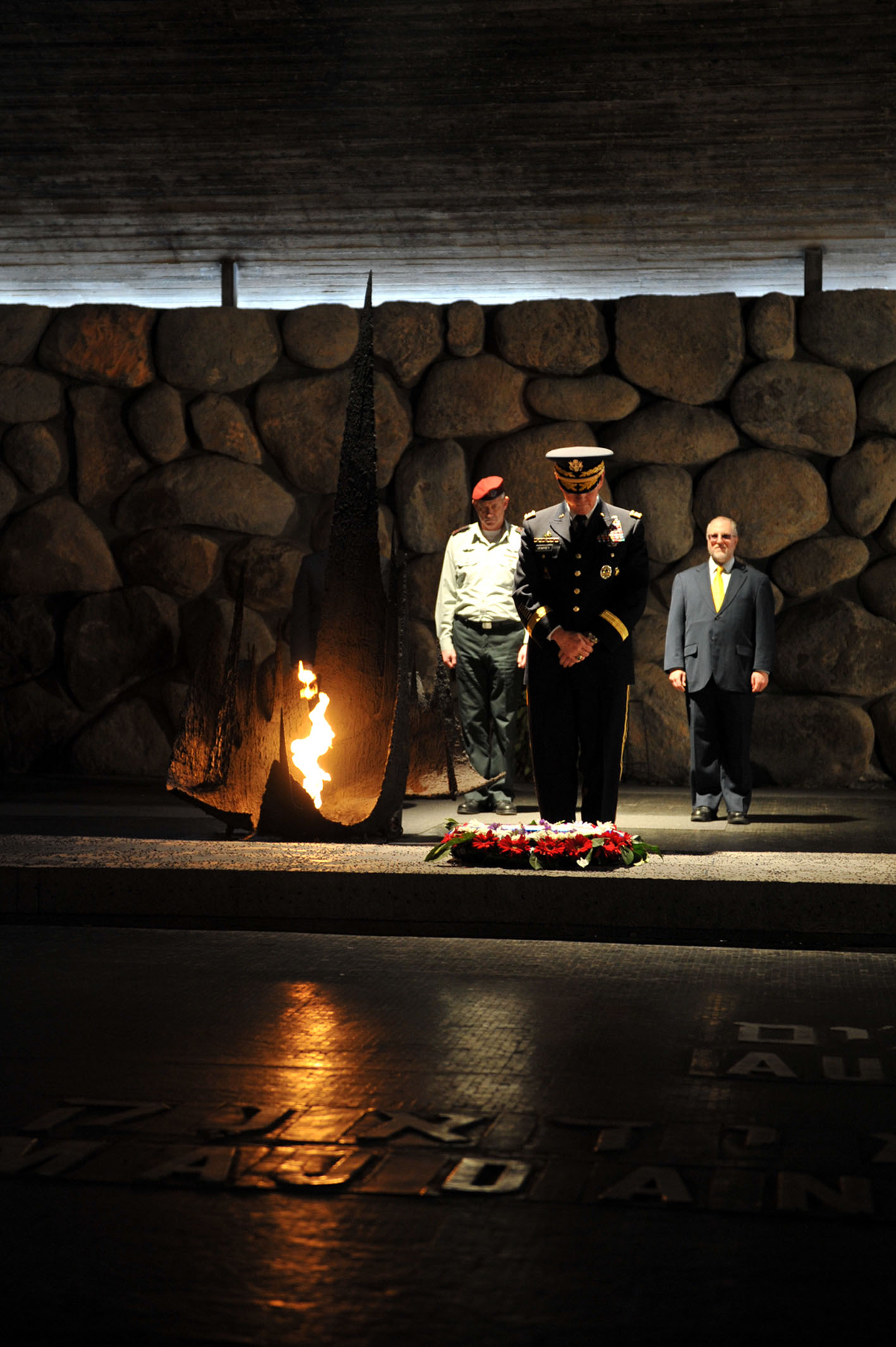
Dempsey and Lt. General Benny Gantz, Chief of General Staff of the Israel Defense Forces visiting the Yad VaShem Holocaust Memorial Museum in Jerusalem, Israel, where Dempsey paid respect to the memory of Holocaust victims on 20 January 2012

1. Win, Learn, Focus, Adapt, Win Again – Article series for Army Magazine (AUSA). October 2010 – February 2011
2. Inspired and humbled by the sacrifice of our troops – The Hill, 24 May 2011
3. From the Chairman – Joint Force Quarterly no. 64. January 2012
4. From the Chairman – Joint Force Quarterly no. 65. April 2012
5. Preserving the bonds of trust – The Hill, 22 May 2012
6. From the Chairman – Joint Force Quarterly no. 66. July 2012
7. From the Chairman: Building Tomorrow's Leaders – Joint Force Quarterly no. 67. October 2012
8. From the Chairman: Sustaining our Edge – Joint Force Quarterly no. 68. January 2013
9. From the Chairman: Risky Business – Joint Force Quarterly no. 69. April 2013
10. Remember and uphold tradition – The Hill, 21 May 2013
11. From the Chairman: Why We Serve – Joint Force Quarterly no. 70. July 2013
12. From the Chairman: Leadership in Historic Times – Joint Force Quarterly no. 71. October 2013
13. From the Chairman: Mount Up and Move Out – Joint Force Quarterly no. 72. January 2014

== Interviews ==
1. Dempsey Muses on Challenges as New Head of Joint Chiefs – Thom Shanker. New York Times. 3 October 2011.
2. The New Chairman of the Joint Chiefs of Staff on "Getting to the Truth" – Karl Moore. Forbes Magazine. 20 October 2011.
3. Gen. Martin Dempsey's Interview with Jeremy Paxman – Jeremy Paxman, BBC. 28 November 2011.
4. Transcript: Gen. Martin Dempsey's Interview with Fareed Zakaria – Fareed Zakaria. CNN. 19 February 2012.
5. Video: Gen. Martin Dempsey's Interview with Charlie Rose – Charlie Rose. 16 March 2012.
6. Video: Gen. Martin Dempsey's Interview on Leadership – The Pentagon Channel. October 2012.
7. Video: Gen. Martin Dempsey at the National Press Club – National Press Club. 10 October 2012.
8. Transcript: Gen. Martin Dempsey talks to Dan Rather – Dan Rather Reports. AXS.tv. 13 November 2012.
9. Transcript: Gen. Martin Dempsey talks to Ted Koppel – Rock Center with Brian Williams. NBC. 24 January 2013.
10. Transcript: Sec. Panetta & Gen. Dempsey's Interview with Candy Crowley – State of the Union. CNN. 3 February 2013.
11. Transcript: Sec. Panetta & Gen. Dempsey's Interview with Chuck Todd – Meet the Press. NBC. 3 February 2013.
12. Transcript: Gen. Martin Dempsey talks to Rachel Martin – Weekend Edition. NPR. 17 February 2013.
13. Transcript: Gen. Martin Dempsey talks to Candy Crowley – State of the Union. CNN. 7 July 2013.
14. Transcript: Gen. Martin Dempsey talks to Martha Raddatz – This Week. ABC. 4 August 2013.
15. Transcript: Gen. Martin Dempsey talks to Steve Inskeep - NPR. Morning Edition. 4 June 2020.

== Speeches ==
1. Gen. Dempsey Becomes the 18th Chairman of the Joint Chiefs of Staff – 30 September 2011
2. The Atlantic Council of the United States: Security and Partnership in an Age of Austerity – 9 December 2011.
3. End of Mission Ceremony in Baghdad, Iraq – 15 December 2011.
4. Duke University's Ambassador S. Davis Phillips Family International Lecture Series: A New Vision for the US Military – 12 January 2012.
5. West Point Class of 2013 500th Night – 21 January 2012.
6. Harvard University's John F. Kennedy Jr. Forum: Security Paradox – 12 April 2012.
7. The Carnegie Endowment for International Peace: A Conversation with General Martin Dempsey – 1 May 2012.
8. Kansas State University's 161st Landon Lecture – 1 October 2012

Military offices
Preceded by Ricardo S. Sanchez	Commanding General of the 1st Armored Division; 2003–2004	Succeeded by Fred D. Robinson Jr.
Preceded by David Petraeus	Commander of the Multi-National Security Transition Command – Iraq; 2005–2007	Succeeded by James Dubik
Preceded by David C. Nichols	Deputy Commander of United States Central Command; 2007–2008	Succeeded by John R. Allen
Preceded by William Fallon	Commander of United States Central Command; Acting; 2008	Succeeded by David Petraeus
Preceded by William Wallace	Commanding General of the Army Training and Doctrine Command; 2008–2011	Succeeded by John Sterling; Acting
Preceded by George Casey	Chief of Staff of the Army; 2011	Succeeded by Raymond Odierno
Preceded by Michael Mullen	Chairman of the Joint Chiefs of Staff; 2011–2015	Succeeded by Joseph Dunford
U.S. order of precedence (ceremonial)
Preceded by Michael Mullen as former Chair of the Joint Chiefs of Staff	Order of precedence of the United States as former Chair of the Joint Chiefs of Staff	Succeeded by Joseph Dunford as former Chair of the Joint Chiefs of Staff
