= Commanding General, United States Army Training and Doctrine Command =

Senior appointment in the U.S. Army

Commanding General of United States Army Training and Doctrine Command
- Shoulder sleeve insignia of TRADOC

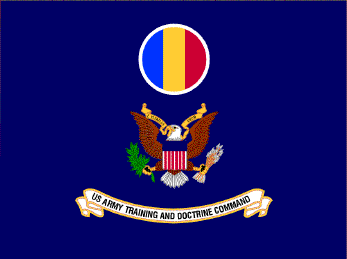
- Flag of TRADOC
- Department of the Army; United States Army
- Status: Abolished
- Abbreviation: CG TRADOC
- Reports to: Secretary of the Army; Chief of Staff of the United States Army
- Seat: Fort Eustis, Virginia, U.S.
- Appointer: The president with Senate advice and consent
- Term length: 2–3 years (approx.)
- Precursor: Commanding General, Continental Army Command
- Inaugural holder: GEN William E. DePuy
- Formation: 1 July 1973
- Final holder: General Gary M. Brito
- Abolished: 2 October 2025
- Superseded by: Commanding General, U.S. Army Transformation and Training Command
- Deputy: Deputy Commanding General and Chief of Staff, U.S. Army Training and Doctrine Command
- Website: Official Website

The commanding general of United States Army Training and Doctrine Command (CG TRADOC) was the head of United States Army Training and Doctrine Command (TRADOC). They headed approximately 27,000 soldiers and 11,000 civilians who worked at 21 installations across the continental United States. As commander, one of their main duties was to study a number of ideas and initiatives as outlined in previous TRADOC Campaign Plans and create a plan of action for the future. Implementations made affected TRADOC's 32 schools as well as other training throughout the United States Army. The last commanding general was General Gary M. Brito.

== List of TRADOC commanding generals ==
No.	Commander		Term		
No.	Portrait	Name	Took office	Left office	Term length
1	William E. DePuy	General; William E. DePuy (1919–1992)	1 July 1973	30 June 1977	3 years, 364 days
2	Donn A. Starry	General; Donn A. Starry (1925–2011)	1 July 1977	31 July 1981	4 years, 30 days
3	Glenn K. Otis	General; Glenn K. Otis (1929–2013)	1 August 1981	10 March 1983	1 year, 221 days
4	William R. Richardson	General; William R. Richardson (1929–2023)	11 March 1983	29 June 1986	3 years, 110 days
5	Carl E. Vuono	General; Carl E. Vuono (born 1934)	30 June 1986	11 June 1987	346 days
6	Maxwell R. Thurman	General; Maxwell R. Thurman (1931–1995)	29 June 1987	1 August 1989	2 years, 33 days
7	John W. Foss	General; John W. Foss (1933–2020)	2 August 1989	22 August 1991	2 years, 20 days
8	Frederick M. Franks Jr.	General; Frederick M. Franks Jr. (born 1936)	23 August 1991	26 October 1994	3 years, 64 days
9	William W. Hartzog	General; William W. Hartzog (1941–2020)	27 October 1994	13 September 1998	3 years, 321 days
10	John N. Abrams	General; John N. Abrams (1946–2018)	14 September 1998	6 November 2002	4 years, 53 days
11	Kevin P. Byrnes	General; Kevin P. Byrnes (born 1950)	7 November 2002	8 August 2005	2 years, 274 days
-	Anthony R. Jones	Lieutenant General; Anthony R. Jones (born 1948); Acting	9 August 2005	12 October 2005	64 days
12	William S. Wallace	General; William S. Wallace (born 1946)	13 October 2005	7 December 2008	3 years, 55 days
13	Martin E. Dempsey	General; Martin E. Dempsey (born 1952)	8 December 2008	11 April 2011	2 years, 124 days
-	John E. Sterling Jr.	Lieutenant General; John E. Sterling Jr. (born 1953); Acting	11 April 2011	29 April 2011	18 days
14	Robert W. Cone	General; Robert W. Cone (1957–2016)	29 April 2011	14 March 2014	2 years, 319 days
15	David G. Perkins	General; David G. Perkins (born 1957)	14 March 2014	2 March 2018	3 years, 353 days
16	Stephen J. Townsend	General; Stephen J. Townsend (born 1959)	2 March 2018	21 June 2019	1 year, 111 days
17	Paul E. Funk II	General; Paul E. Funk II (born 1962)	21 June 2019	8 September 2022	3 years, 79 days
18	Gary M. Brito	General; Gary M. Brito (born 1963/1964)	8 September 2022	1 October 2025	3 years, 23 days

== See also ==
- United States Army Training and Doctrine Command
