= David G. Perkins =

US Army general

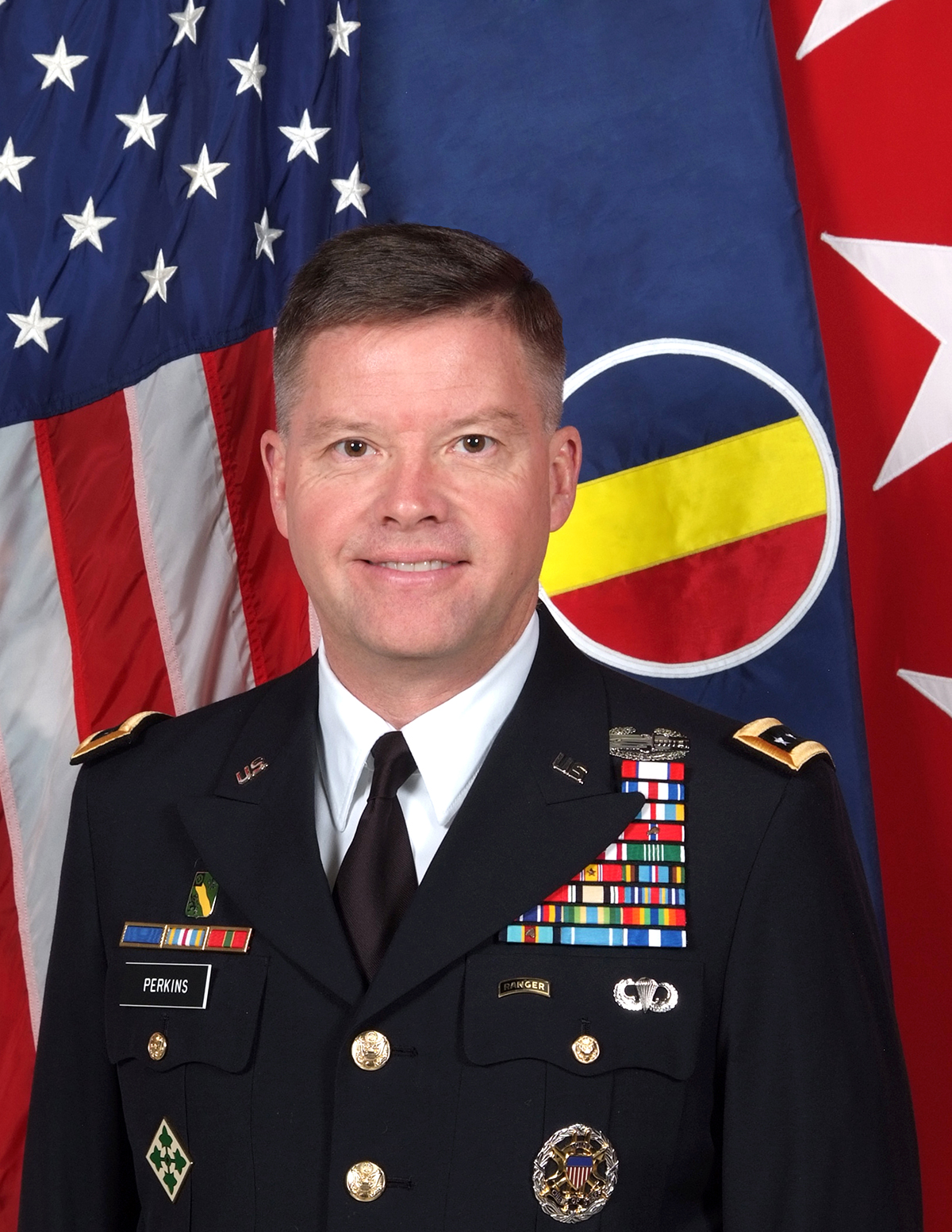
- Official portrait, 2015
- Born: 12 November 1957 (age 68); Goffstown, New Hampshire, U.S.
- Military career
- Allegiance: United States
- Branch: United States Army
- Service years: 1980–2018
- Rank: General
- Commands: United States Army Training and Doctrine Command; United States Army Combined Arms Center; 4th Infantry Division; Joint Multinational Training Command, Germany; 2nd Brigade, 3rd Infantry Division; 1st Battalion, 63rd Armor Regiment
- Conflicts: Iraq War: Operation Iraqi Freedom; Operation New Dawn
- Awards: Army Distinguished Service Medal (3); Silver Star; Defense Superior Service Medal; Legion of Merit (2); Bronze Star Medal (2)

David Gerard Perkins (born 12 November 1957) is a retired United States Army four-star general. His last assignment before retiring was commanding general of the United States Army Training and Doctrine Command.

== Early life ==
Perkins was born in Goffstown, New Hampshire, on 12 November 1957, and was raised in Keene, New Hampshire; Rochester, New York; and Fairport, New York. Perkins earned his Boy Scouts of America Eagle Scout award in 1974, and graduated from Fairport High School in 1976.

== Military career ==
Perkins graduated from the United States Military Academy at West Point in 1980 and was commissioned as a second lieutenant of Armor. In 1988, he received a Master of Science degree in mechanical engineering from the University of Michigan. He completed both Ranger and Airborne Schools. He then served in armor assignments from platoon leader to battalion and brigade staff positions.

Perkins commanded the 1st Battalion, 63rd Armor Regiment from 1996 to 1998. The battalion served in Macedonia and took part in a United Nations mission to monitor Macedonia's borders with Albania, Kosovo, and Serbia. In 1999, Perkins received a master's degree from the Naval War College.

In 2003, Perkins commanded the 2nd Brigade, 3rd Infantry Division during the invasion of Iraq. His unit was the first across the border, and first to enter the downtown government areas of Baghdad. Perkins is featured prominently in the book Thunder Run: The Armored Strike to Capture Baghdad, and received the Silver Star for his part in the invasion.

In 2004 and 2005, Perkins was executive assistant to the Vice Chairman of the Joint Chiefs of Staff. From 2005 to 2007, he commanded the Joint Multinational Training Command in Germany. From 2007 to 2008, Perkins was the G-3 (Plans, Operations, and Training staff officer) for United States Army Europe and Seventh United States Army.

In 2008, Perkins became the director for strategic effects (CJ-9) for Multi-National Force-Iraq. In this capacity, he coordinated and implemented political, economic, and communications activities on behalf of MNF-I, and served as the organization's spokesman. From 2009 to 2011, he commanded the 4th Infantry Division at Fort Carson. From 2011 to 2014, Perkins was commander of the Combined Arms Center and commandant of the United States Army Command and General Staff College at Fort Leavenworth.

On 14 March 2014, Perkins assumed command of the United States Army Training and Doctrine Command (TRADOC) from Robert W. Cone. On 2 March 2018, Perkins was succeeded at TRADOC by Stephen J. Townsend and he retired one week later.

== Awards and decorations ==
Combat Action Badge
Ranger tab
Basic Parachutist Badge
Joint Chiefs of Staff Identification Badge
4th Infantry Division Patch worn as his Combat Service Identification Badge
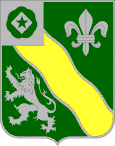
63rd Armor Regiment Distinctive Unit Insignia
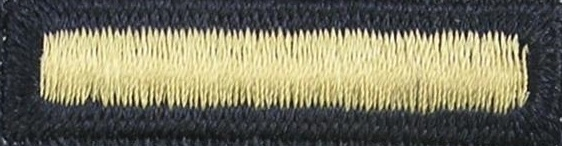
6 Overseas Service Bars

Army Distinguished Service Medal with two bronze oak leaf clusters
Silver Star
Defense Superior Service Medal
Legion of Merit with oak leaf cluster
Bronze Star Medal with one bronze oak leaf cluster
Meritorious Service Medal with one bronze oak leaf cluster
Army Commendation Medal
Army Achievement Medal with two bronze oak leaf clusters
Army Presidential Unit Citation
Joint Meritorious Unit Award
Superior Unit Award
National Defense Service Medal with one bronze service star
Armed Forces Expeditionary Medal
Kosovo Campaign Medal
Iraq Campaign Medal
Global War on Terrorism Expeditionary Medal
Global War on Terrorism Service Medal
Armed Forces Service Medal
Army Service Ribbon
Army Overseas Service Ribbon with bronze award numeral 4
United Nations Medal
NATO Medal for Kosovo

== Family ==
Perkins and his wife Ginger are the parents of two children, Cassandra and Chad, both of whom are captains in the United States Army as of March 2018.

Military offices
Preceded by Robert L. Caslen	Commandant of the Command and General Staff College; 2011–2014	Succeeded by Robert Brooks Brown
Preceded by Robert W. Cone	Commanding General, United States Army Training and Doctrine Command; 2014–2018	Succeeded by Stephen J. Townsend
