= Robert W. Cone =

US Army general

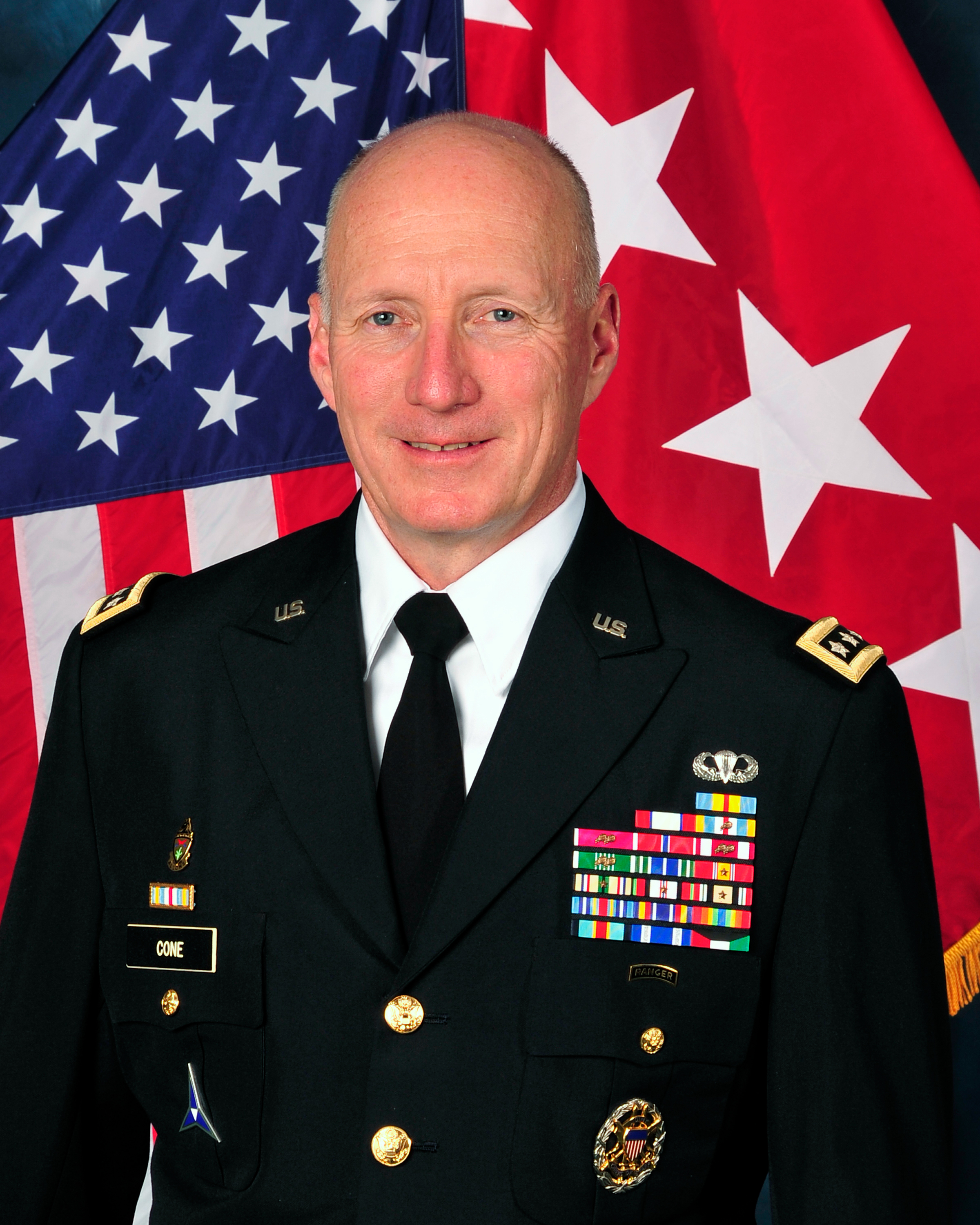
- Official portrait, 2011
- Born: 19 March 1957; Manchester, New Hampshire, U.S.
- Died: September 19, 2016 (aged 59); Green Bay, Wisconsin, U.S.
- Burial place: Arlington National Cemetery
- Military career
- Allegiance: United States
- Branch: United States Army
- Service years: 1979–2014
- Rank: General
- Commands: United States Army Training and Doctrine Command; III Corps; Fort Hood; Fort Irwin National Training Center; Combined Security Transition Command – Afghanistan; 2nd Brigade, 4th Infantry Division; 1st Squadron, 3rd Armored Cavalry Regiment
- Conflicts: Gulf War; War in Afghanistan; Iraq War: Operation Iraqi Freedom; Operation New Dawn
- Awards: Defense Distinguished Service Medal; Army Distinguished Service Medal (2); Defense Superior Service Medal (2); Legion of Merit (3); Bronze Star Medal

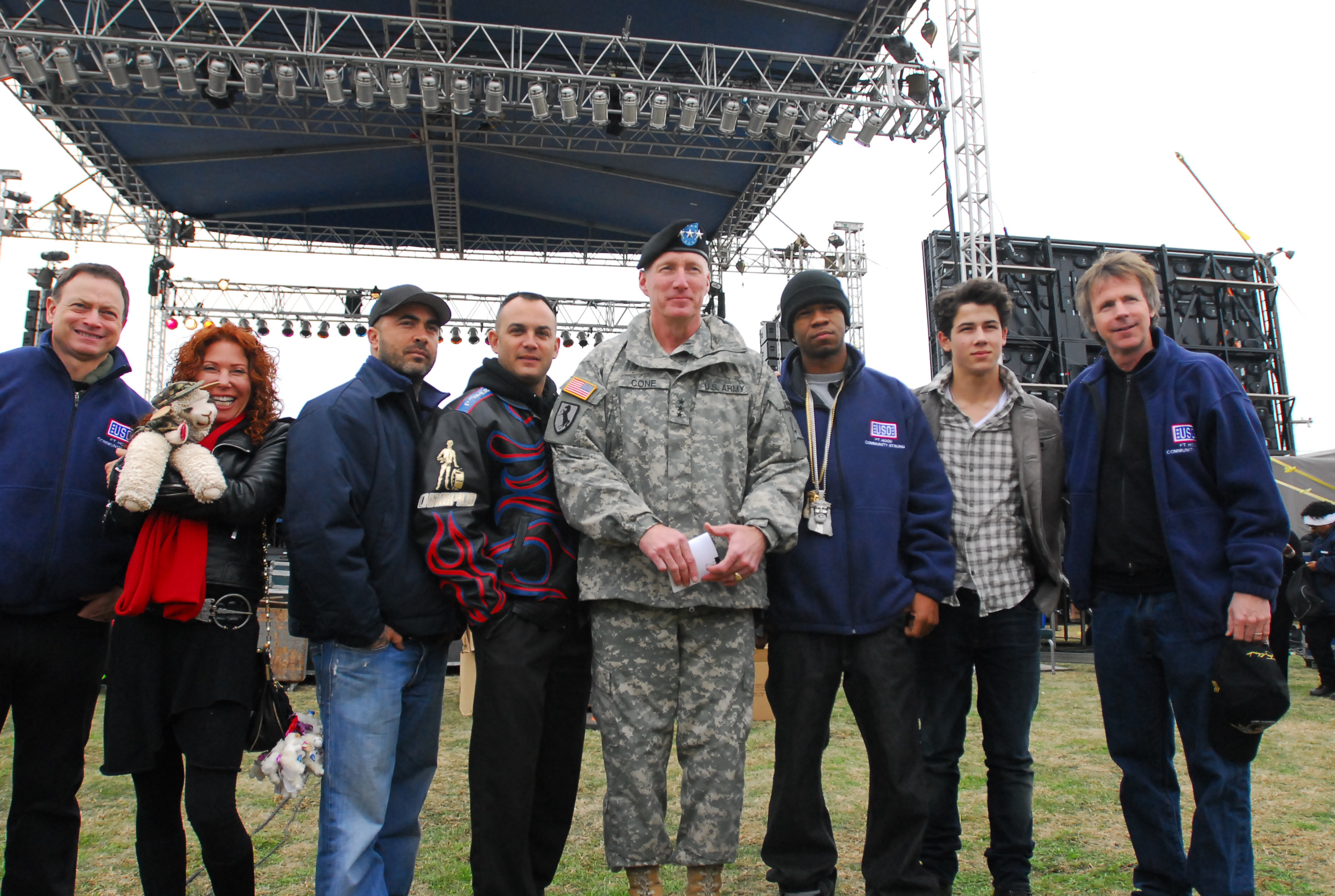
Cone, USO, 2009

Robert William Cone (19 March 1957 – 19 September 2016) was a United States Army four-star general who last served as the commanding general of United States Army Training and Doctrine Command (TRADOC). He assumed command of TRADOC on 29 April 2011. He previously served as the commander of Fort Hood and III Corps on 22 September 2009, with which he deployed to Iraq in February 2010, and served as the deputy commanding general for operations, United States Forces – Iraq, until February 2011. Prior to that, he served as the special assistant to the commanding general of TRADOC. He retired in 2014.

== Personal life and education ==
Cone was born on March 19, 1957, and grew up in Manchester, New Hampshire, graduating from the city's Memorial High School in 1975. He entered the United States Military Academy that fall and graduated with a Bachelor of Science degree in 1979, receiving his commission as a second lieutenant in the Armor Branch.

Cone later earned a Master of Arts degree in sociology from the University of Texas at Austin and completed military education at the Naval War College, the United States Army Command and General Staff College, the Infantry Officer Advanced Course, and the Armor Officer Basic Course.

Cone was diagnosed with stage four metastatic prostate cancer in 2011, four months following his promotion to four-star general and underwent clinical trial therapy. Cone and his wife Jill moved to Shawano, Wisconsin, upon his 2014 retirement. Cone died on 19 September 2016, at a hospital in Green Bay, Wisconsin, and was buried at Arlington National Cemetery on 9 December 2016.

The General Robert W. Cone Heritage Center in Fort Irwin, California, opened on 28 August 2021, named after him. The museum part of the Heritage Center is dedicated to the history of the 11th Armored Calvary Regiment (Black Horse) and the 916th support Birgade (NTC Operations) in addition to other former units who were based in Fort Irwin; the main room where functions are held is dedicated entirely to General Robert W. Cone. Along the walls of the room are pictures and mementos from his career donated by General Cone's wife.

== Military career ==
Cone served in a variety of command, staff, and operational assignments in the United States, Germany, and Southwest Asia.

His first duty assignment was with the 2nd Armored Division at Fort Hood, Texas, where he served as a platoon leader and troop executive officer in the 2nd Squadron, 1st Cavalry Regiment.

In October 1981, Cone became the aide-de-camp to the assistant division commander, 2nd Armored Division. He then served as the battalion maintenance officer, combat service support company commander, and tank company commander in the 1st Battalion, 67th Armored Regiment (1-67 AR). He attended the Infantry Advanced Course in 1985, followed by graduate school at the University of Texas at Austin. Next, Cone served as an instructor and assistant professor in the Department of Behavioral Sciences and Leadership at the United States Military Academy at West Point, New York. After selection and completion of United States Army Command and General Staff College at Fort Leavenworth, Kansas, Cone reported to the 11th Armored Cavalry Regiment (Blackhorse Regiment) in Fulda, Germany.

Cone served as the 2nd Squadron Operations Officer (S-3) during Operation Desert Storm, became the regimental operations officer (S-3) in November 1991, then the regimental executive officer in March 1993. He left the 11th Armored Cavalry Regiment in the spring of 1994. In his next assignment, Cone moved to Fort Bliss, Texas, and became the regimental executive officer of the 3rd Armored Cavalry Regiment (Brave Rifles). He assumed command of the 1st Squadron, 3rd Armored Cavalry Regiment in October 1994. After squadron command, he served as the special assistant to the commanding general, Fort Carson, Colorado, then reported to the Naval War College in Newport, Rhode Island, in 1997.

Cone became the division operations officer (G-3) of the 4th Infantry Division (Mechanized), Fort Hood, Texas, in July 1998. He assumed command of the 2d Brigade, 4th Infantry Division, the following year. His brigade deployed to South Korea as part of Exercise Foal Eagle. He led his brigade in the army's Division Capstone Exercise in April 2001 as the culminating event in the development of the heavy digital force.

Following brigade command, Cone served as the director of the Joint Advanced Warfighting Program, Institute for Defense Analyses located in Alexandria, Virginia, where he was responsible for developing joint force concepts and experiments. He participated in Operation Iraqi Freedom in 2003 as the director of the United States Joint Forces Command (JFCOM) Joint Lessons Learned Collection Team. Cone was tasked to capture, document, and report real-time lessons learned from combat operations in Iraq and Afghanistan. His work led to the establishment of the Joint Center for Operational Analysis at JFCOM. After returning from the Middle East, Cone served as the director of the JFCOM Joint Center for Operational Analysis in Suffolk, Virginia.

=== Senior command ===
In September 2004, Cone became the commanding general of the United States Army's National Training Center (NTC) at Fort Irwin, California. During his 33-month command, Cone implemented a broad array of changes reorienting training on counterinsurgency operations. In conjunction with the Joint IED Defeat Organization (JIEDDO), Cone established the Joint Center of Operational Excellence in training for the defeat of improvised explosive devices (IED) at the NTC.

Cone deployed to Afghanistan in June 2007 as part of Operation Enduring Freedom and assumed command of the Combined Security Transition Command - Afghanistan. His 18-month command focused on developing the Afghan National Army and police. During his tenure, the Afghan National Army expanded from 50,000 troops to close to 80,000 and a broad array of reforms were implemented to address corruption and training in the Afghan National Police.

After returning from Afghanistan, Cone served as the special assistant to the Army Chief of Staff then became the special assistant to the commanding general of the United States Army Training and Doctrine Command, where he was responsible for officer and enlisted soldier Initial Entry Training.

In September 2009, Cone assumed command of III Corps and Fort Hood, Texas. In March 2010, he deployed to Iraq with III Corps Headquarters and became the deputy commanding general for operations, the second highest-ranking military officer in United States Forces – Iraq until 8 February 2011. He had responsibility for operations throughout the entire country, including the development and training of fielded Iraqi Security Forces. He oversaw the transition from Operation Iraqi Freedom and counterinsurgency operations to Operation New Dawn and stability operations. This transition included the drawdown of service members from roughly 100,000 to less than 50,000 and the transfer of more than 120 bases, the largest single movement of military personnel and equipment since World War II. Cone returned to Fort Hood on 9 February 2011. He then was promoted to the four-star rank of general and took command of United States Army Training and Doctrine Command in April 2011.

== Awards and decorations ==
Basic Parachutist Badge
Ranger Tab
Office of the Joint Chiefs of Staff Identification Badge
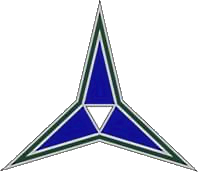
III Corps Combat Service Identification Badge
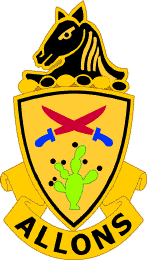
11th Armored Cavalry Regiment Distinctive Unit Insignia
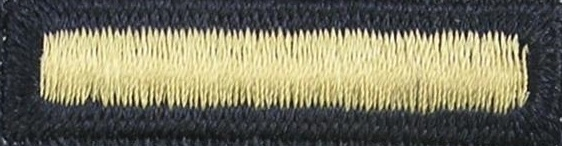
6 Overseas Service Bars

Defense Distinguished Service Medal
Army Distinguished Service Medal with one bronze oak leaf cluster
Defense Superior Service Medal with oak leaf cluster
Legion of Merit with two Oak Leaf Clusters
Bronze Star Medal
Meritorious Service Medal with two Oak Leaf Clusters
Army Commendation Medal with two Oak Leaf Clusters
Army Achievement Medal
Joint Meritorious Unit Award
Meritorious Unit Commendation
Superior Unit Award
National Defense Service Medal with one bronze Service Star
Southwest Asia Service Medal with bronze Service Star
Afghanistan Campaign Medal with one service star
Iraq Campaign Medal with one service star
Global War on Terrorism Expeditionary Medal
Global War on Terrorism Service Medal
Army Service Ribbon
Army Overseas Service Ribbon
NATO Medal for service with ISAF
Ghazi Wazir Mohammad Akbar Kahn State Medal (Islamic Republic of Afghanistan)
Kuwait Liberation Medal (Kuwait)

Military offices
Preceded by Robert Durbin	Commander of Combined Security Transition Command — Afghanistan; 2007–2008	Succeeded by Richard Formica
Preceded by Charles H. Jacoby Jr.	Deputy Commanding General for Operations, United States Forces — Iraq; 2010–2011	Succeeded by Frank G. Helmick
Preceded by Rick Lynch	Commanding General of III Corps and Fort Hood; 2009–2011	Succeeded by Donald M. Campbell, Jr.
Preceded by Martin E. Dempsey	Commanding General, United States Army Training and Doctrine Command; 2011–2014	Succeeded by David G. Perkins
