= William S. Wallace =

US Army general

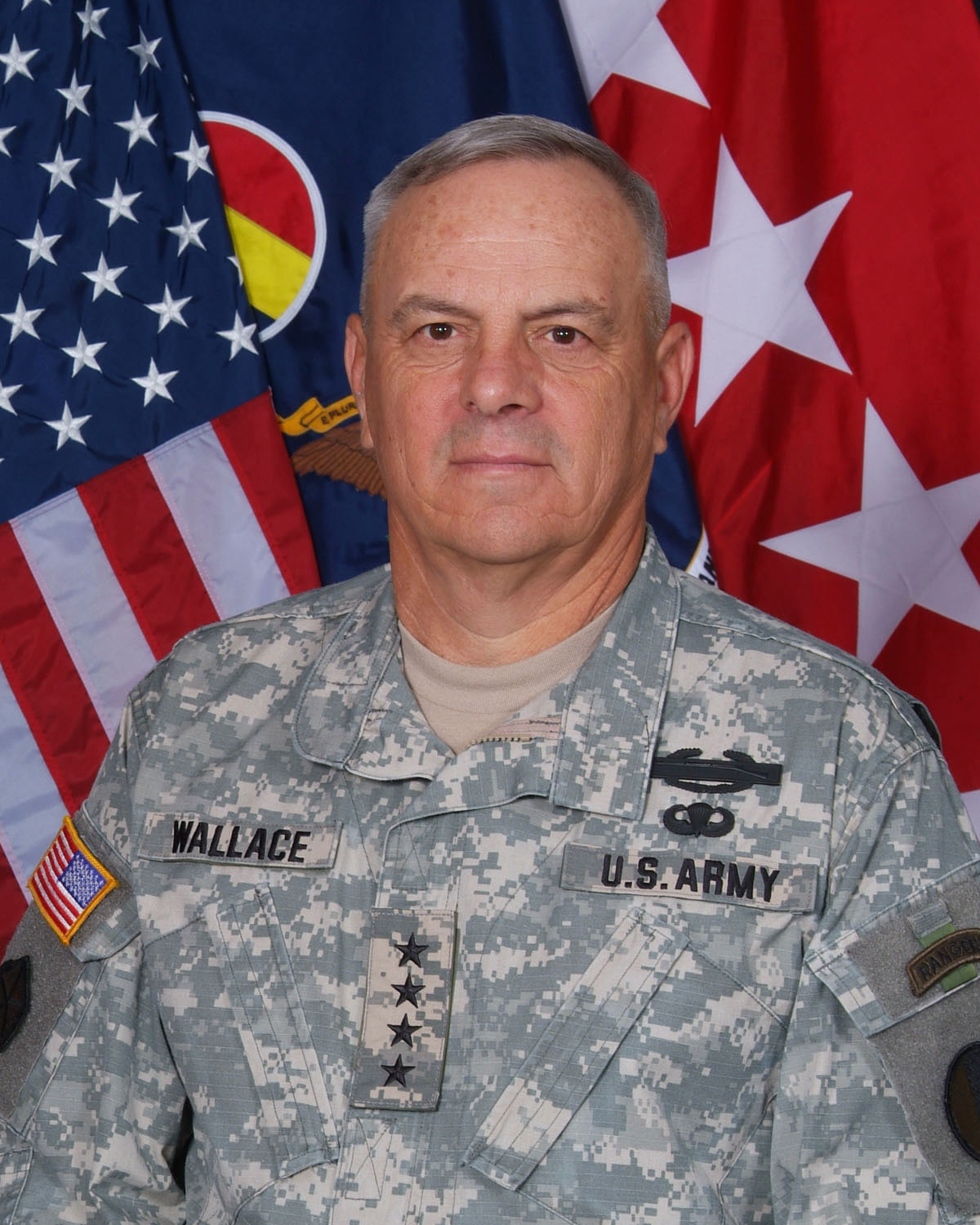
- General William S. Wallace
- Born: 31 December 1946 (age 79); Chicago, Illinois, U.S.
- Military career
- Allegiance: United States
- Branch: United States Army
- Service years: 1969–2008
- Rank: General
- Commands: United States Army Training and Doctrine Command; United States Army Command and General Staff College; United States Army Combined Arms Center; V Corps; Joint Warfighting Center; 4th Infantry Division; 11th Armored Cavalry Regiment
- Conflicts: Vietnam War; Iraq War
- Awards: Defense Distinguished Service Medal; Army Distinguished Service Medal (2); Legion of Merit (5); Bronze Star Medal

William Scott Wallace (born 31 December 1946) is a retired four-star general in the United States Army. He served as Commanding General, United States Army Training and Doctrine Command (TRADOC) at Fort Monroe, Virginia from 13 October 2005 to 8 December 2008. He retired from the army on 8 December 2008.

== Early life ==
Wallace was born on 31 December 1946, in Chicago, Illinois. He attended Louisville Eastern High School in Louisville, Kentucky, graduating in 1965.

== Military career ==
Wallace was commissioned in 1969 after graduating from the United States Military Academy at West Point, then qualified as an armor officer before serving in the Vietnam War. His advisory experience as a member of a "two-man district advisory team that worked with Vietnamese troops in Bac Lieu Province.. I'll tell you quite frankly, wasn't nearly as professionally satisfying as being a battalion, regimental, division, or corps commander." After serving in Vietnam, Wallace became a company commander, battalion S-1 (adjutant), and battalion S-3 operations officer with the 82nd Airborne Division.

In 1977, Wallace attended the Armor Officer Advanced Course at Fort Knox, Kentucky, and the Naval Postgraduate School in Monterey, California. In 1983, he joined the 2d Armored Cavalry Regiment in Germany in 1983 and, in 1991, assumed command of the 11th Armored Cavalry Regiment in Fulda, Germany.

As a general officer, Wallace commanded the 4th Infantry Division (Mechanized) and then the Joint Warfighting Center and Director of Joint Training at the United States Joint Forces Command in Suffolk, Virginia.

Wallace assumed command of V Corps on 18 July 2001. He commanded the corps during the 2003 invasion of Iraq until 14 June 2003, when he left to become the commanding general of the United States Army Combined Arms Center at Fort Leavenworth, Kansas. His replacement in Iraq was Lieutenant General Ricardo S. Sanchez.

Wallace assumed command of the United States Army Training and Doctrine Command (TRADOC) at Fort Monroe, Virginia, on 13 October 2005. He was interviewed by Jane's Defence Weekly, published 4 October 2006. He said that "routine, traditional requirement process needs to be more responsive to urgent needs on the battlefield" - is there something out there, looking through the "entire Rolodex, if you will, of developing capabilities," "that meets that immediate need[?]" He relinquished command of TRADOC, and retired from the United States Army, on 8 December 2008.

== Awards and decorations ==
Among his awards and decorations are:

Defense Distinguished Service Medal
Army Distinguished Service Medal with oak leaf cluster
Legion of Merit with four oak leaf clusters
Bronze Star Medal
Meritorious Service Medal with oak leaf cluster
Army Commendation Medal with valor device and two oak leaf clusters
Army Achievement Medal
Vietnamese Cross of Gallantry

Combat Infantryman Badge
Parachutist Badge
Ranger Tab

Military offices
Preceded by James C. Riley	Commandant of the United States Army Command and General Staff College; 2003–2005	Succeeded by David H. Petraeus
Preceded by Anthony R. Jones (Acting)	Commanding General, United States Army Training and Doctrine Command; 2005–2008	Succeeded by Martin E. Dempsey
