= Kevin P. Byrnes =

US Army general

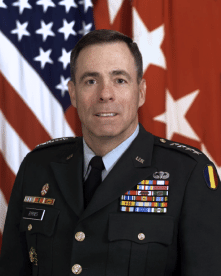
- General Kevin P. Byrnes
- Born: 12 March 1950 (age 76); New York City, New York, U.S.
- Education: Park College; Webster University
- Spouse(s): Carol Groene (div. 2005); Paula Payton
- Children: Patrick; Joseph; Elizabeth; Grace
- Military career
- Allegiance: United States
- Branch: United States Army
- Service years: 1969–2005
- Rank: General (retired as Lieutenant General)
- Commands: United States Army Training and Doctrine Command; Multinational Division (North); 1st Cavalry Division; Joint Task Force Six; 1st Cavalry Division Artillery; 4th Battalion, 3rd Field Artillery Regiment
- Conflicts: Vietnam War
- Awards: Defense Distinguished Service Medal; Army Distinguished Service Medal; Defense Superior Service Medal; Legion of Merit; Bronze Star Medal
- Other work: Vice President and Center Executive Raytheon Huntsville, Alabama

Kevin P. Byrnes (born 12 March 1950) is a retired United States Army general who was officially relieved of command in August 2005 after 36 years of military service for disobeying a lawful order from Army Chief of Staff Peter Schoomaker. In a rare disciplinary act against a four-star general, the Army announced on 9 August 2005, that it had relieved General Byrnes, who was nearing retirement, of his command. The Associated Press reported that although the Army announced no specific allegations against Byrnes, a senior Pentagon official said it involved unspecified sexual misconduct by Byrnes. A lawyer for General Byrnes, Lt. Col. David H. Robertson, stated that the general had been relieved because of an accusation about "a consensual, adult relationship."

== Early life ==
Byrnes was born in New York City on March 12, 1950, one of 8 children of a New York City police officer. Byrnes worked for three years at a gas station while in high school and in 1968 took the advice of a fellow gas station attendant and joined the Army. He did well on aptitude tests and was commissioned through the Officer Candidate School program in 1969. In June 1969 he deployed to Vietnam as a 19-year-old second lieutenant in field artillery. He served there for a year as a forward observer, aerial observer and as a fire direction officer for an eight-inch cannon artillery unit. After returning from Vietnam in 1970, Byrnes used the GI Bill to attend college, earning his Bachelor of Arts in Economics from Park College in 1975. He earned a Master of Arts in Management from Webster University in 1985.

== Military career ==
Byrnes assumed the duties of Commander, United States Army Training and Doctrine Command (TRADOC) on November 7, 2002, after serving as the Director, Army Staff in the Pentagon.

Before he assumed his TRADOC duties, Byrnes served as Director, Army Staff, the Deputy Chief of Staff for Programs and as the Assistant Vice Chief of Staff. Byrnes' other key assignments include: Commanding General, 1st Cavalry Division, Fort Hood, Texas; while deployed in that capacity, he simultaneously served as the Commanding General of the Multinational Division (North) in Tuzla, Bosnia, from October 1998 to August 1999; Director, Force Programs, Office of the Deputy Chief of Staff for Operations and Plans, Washington, D.C.; Assistant Division Commander (Maneuver), 1st Cavalry Division; Commanding General, Joint Task Force Six, Fort Bliss, Texas; Commander, 1st Cavalry Division Artillery, and later Chief of Staff, 1st Cavalry Division; Director of Political and Economic Studies and Director of the Strategic Outreach Initiative for the United States Army War College, Carlisle Barracks, Pennsylvania; Commander, 4th Battalion, 3rd Field Artillery Regiment in 2nd Armored Division (Forward) in Germany; and Commander, Battery C, 1st Battalion, 39th Field Artillery, Fort Bragg, North Carolina. His overseas tours include Vietnam, Germany and Bosnia.

Byrnes was relieved of command in August 2005 following revelations that he had engaged in an extramarital relationship with a married female civilian. An investigation into the alleged misconduct by the Department of Defense Inspector General had concluded that Byrnes, who was separated from his wife, had conducted an adulterous affair with a married women for approximately a year and a half; continued the affair after being ordered by Army Chief of Staff, Peter Shoomaker, to cease contact with the woman; had repeatedly used government funded hotel rooms for adulterous trysts; and had violated U.S. Army financial management regulations by using his personal credit card rather than a government travel card to pay for expenses arising from official government travel.

== Personal life ==
After retiring from the Army Byrnes joined Raytheon as an executive in Huntsville, Alabama. He and his wife, Paula Payton, have a daughter, Grace. He also has a daughter and two sons from a previous marriage: Patrick, an architect and Joseph, an Army officer. His daughter Elizabeth died in 2014.

Military offices
Preceded by John N. Abrams	Commanding General, United States Army Training and Doctrine Command; 2002–2005	Succeeded by Anthony R. Jones (Acting)
