= 1st Cavalry Division Artillery (United States) =

Divisional artillery command of the 1st Cavalry Division, US Army

- Shoulder sleeve insignia of the 1st Cavalry Division
- Active: 1941 - 2005; 2016 - present
- Country: United States of America
- Branch: United States Army
- Type: Field artillery
- Role: Division Force Field Artillery HQ
- Size: Brigade
- Nickname: Red Team
- Equipment: M109A7
- Engagements: World War II; Korean War; Vietnam War; Operations Desert Shield and Desert Storm; Operation Iraqi Freedom
- Decorations: Presidential Unit Citation; Valorous Unit Award; Meritorious Unit Commendation; Philippine Presidential Unit Citation; Republic of Korea Presidential Unit Citation; Chryssoun Aristion Andrias; Republic of Vietnam Cross of Gallantry, with Palm; Republic of Vietnam Civil Action Honor Medal, First Class

Commanders
- Current commander: COL
- Command Sergeant Major: CSM Clayton Vaughn
- Notable commanders: GEN Jack N. Merritt, 1972-74; GEN Tommy Franks, 1987-89; GEN Raymond T. Odierno, 1995-97; LTG Kevin P. Byrnes, 1991-93; LTG Stephen R. Lanza, 2003-05 COL Kelly Webster, 2016-2018; COL Brett Forbes, 2018-2020; COL Neil Snyder, 2020-2022; COL Timothy Gatlin, 2022-2024 COL Nicholas Dvonch, 2024-2026

Insignia
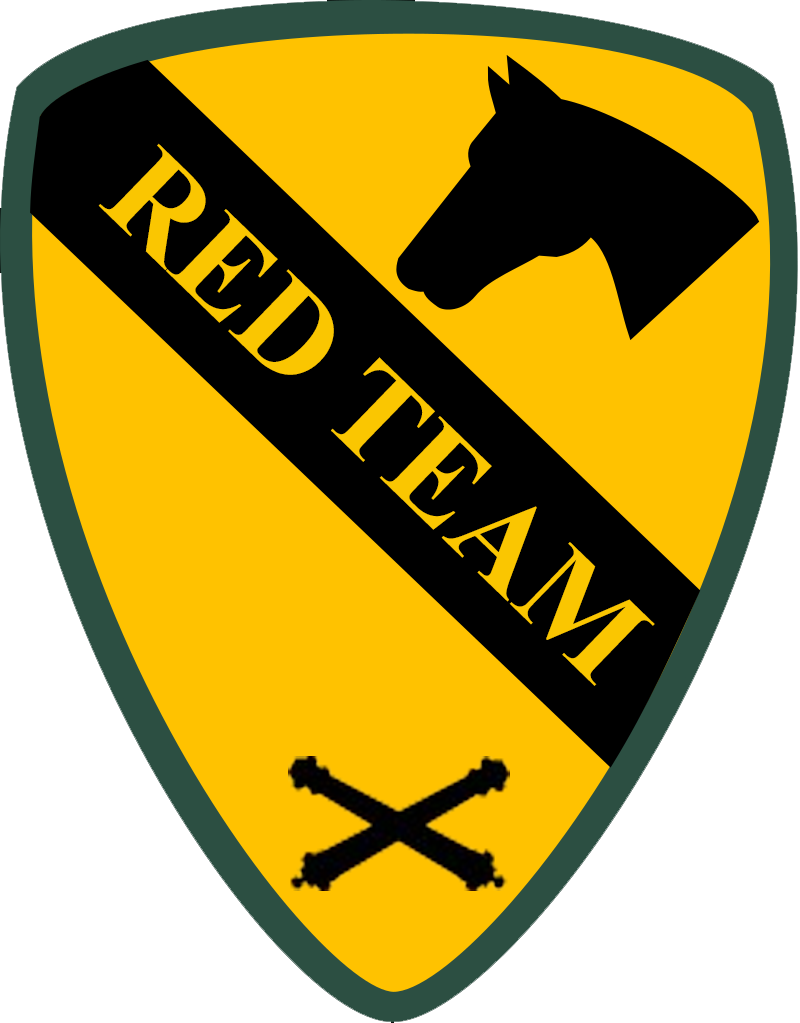
- Combat Service Identification Badge

The 1st Cavalry Division Artillery (DIVARTY) or "Red Team" is the Force Field Artillery Headquarters for the 1st Cavalry Division. The DIVARTY served with the division from 1941 to 2005, including combat service in World War II, the Korean War, the Vietnam War, Operations Desert Shield and Desert Storm, and Operation Iraqi Freedom and in peacetime in Japan, Korea, and Fort Cavazos (Fort Hood), Texas. As the Force Fires Headquarters, the DIVARTY provides fire support coordination and mission command for the training and readiness of field artillery units across the division.

== History ==
=== World War II ===
When first organized in July 1941, the 1st Cavalry Division Artillery consisted of Headquarters and Headquarters Battery, two horse-drawn 75mm battalions (the 82nd Field Artillery Battalion and the 61st Field Artillery Battalion), and a newly organized 105 mm howitzer battalion (the 62nd Field Artillery Battalion) towed by trucks. The 62nd Field Artillery was removed from the division for deployment to Europe in 1942, and replaced by the 99th Field Artillery Battalion. Before deploying to Australia, the two horse-drawn battalions fielded jeeps to replace their horses in order to save shipping space. From June - July, 1943, the DIVARTY deployed from Texas to California, and then on to Australia. In October 1943, another 105mm battalion, the 271st Field Artillery Battalion, was added to the division. In February - March, 1944, the Division Artillery participated in the Admiralty Islands campaign, with the 99th FAB landing with the 5th Cavalry Regiment, the 271st FAB landing with the 12th Cavalry Regiment, and 61st FAB landing with the 7th Cavalry Regiment

=== Korean War ===
In late 1957, as part of the Army's reorganization under the Pentomic structure, the DIVARTY returned to Korea, replacing the 24th Infantry Division. The headquarters was stationed Tonggu and later at Kaya Ri, a five-battery 105mm battalion (2nd Bn, 19th Arty) at Tonggu and later Ichon Ni, and a composite battalion of 155 mm howitzers (twelve howitzers in two batteries), 8-in howitzers (a single four-gun battery) and Honest John rockets (a battery of two launchers) stationed at Tonggu and later at Pobwon-Ni.

Under a modified Pentomic structure from 1960 to 1963, the DIVARTY consisted of 5 direct support battalions armed with 105 mm howitzers (3 towed and 2 self-propelled), and a composite battalion of 8-in howitzers and Honest John rockets.

=== Vietnam ===
On 1 July 1965, the Division Artillery, less personnel and equipment, returned to the United States, and reflagged elements of the 11th Air Assault Division (Test) and the 2nd Infantry Division at Fort Benning, Georgia.

Three battalions (2nd Bn, 19th Arty; 1st Bn, 21st Arty; and 1st Bn, 77th Arty) were 105 mm towed battalions armed with the new M102 howitzer. The 2nd Bn, 20th Arty was an aerial rocket artillery (ARA) battalion, consisting of three batteries, each with twelve UH-1B helicopters firing 2.75-inch rockets, while Btry E, 82nd Arty was an aviation battery with 20 helicopters for observation and other aviation support. Between July and September 1965, the newly organized 1st Cavalry Division Artillery departed Fort Benning for combat in Vietnam

=== Global war on terror ===
In preparation for deployment to Iraq, the division provisionally reorganized DIVARTY as a brigade combat team (BCT). On 6 April 2004, the DIVARTY assumed control of Al-Rashid district in Baghdad from the 1st Armored Division Artillery Combat Team. Operating as a provisional BCT, the DIVARTY's task organization included the 1st Battalion, 8th Cavalry Regiment; the 1st Squadron, 7th Cavalry Regiment; the 1st Battalion, 21st Field Artillery Regiment; Company B, 8th Engineer Battalion; the 515th Forward Support Battalion (Provisional); and the 2nd Battalion, 24th Marines. For a year, the "Red Team" conducted stability operations before returning to Fort Hood.

As part of the division's conversion to modular brigade combat teams, the DIVARTY was inactivated on 26 June 2005. On 2 April 2015, the DIVARTY was activated by reflagging the 41st Field Artillery Brigade.

== Lineage and honors ==
=== Lineage ===
- Constituted 1 November 1940 in the Regular Army as Headquarters and Headquarters Battery, 1st Cavalry Division Artillery
- Activated 3 January 1941 at Fort Bliss, Texas
- Reorganized and redesignated 4 December 1943 as Headquarters and Headquarters Battery, 1st Cavalry Division Artillery (Special)
- Reorganizedand redesignated 25 March 1949 as Headquarters and Headquarters Battery, 1st Cavalry Division Artillery
- Inactivated 26 June 2005 at Fort Hood, Texas
- Activated 2 April 2015 at Fort Hood, Texas

=== Campaign credit ===
Conflict	Streamer	Year(s)
World War II	New Guinea	1943
World War II	Bismarck Archipelago	1943
World War II	Leyte with Arrowhead	1944
World War II	Luzon	1944
Korean War	UN Defensive	1950
Korean War	UN Offensive	1950
Korean War	CCF Intervention	1950–1951
Korean War	First UN Counteroffensive	1951
Korean War	CCF Spring Offensive	1951
Korean War	UN Summer–Fall Offensive	1951
Korean War	Second Korean Winter	1951–1952
Vietnam War	Defense	1965
Vietnam War	Counteroffensive	1965–1966
Vietnam War	Counteroffensive, Phase II	1966–1967
Vietnam War	Counteroffensive, Phase III	1967–1968
Vietnam War	Tet Counteroffensive	1968
Vietnam War	Counteroffensive, Phase IV	1968
Vietnam War	Counteroffensive, Phase V	1968
Vietnam War	Counteroffensive, Phase VI	1968–1969
Vietnam War	Tet 69/Counteroffensive	1969
Vietnam War	Summer–Fall 1969	1969
Vietnam War	Winter–Spring 1970	1969–1970
Vietnam War	Sanctuary Counteroffensive	1970
Vietnam War	Counteroffensive, Phase VII	1970–1971
Gulf War	Defense of Saudi Arabia	1991
Gulf War	Liberation and Defense of Kuwait	1991
Iraq	Iraqi Governance	2004
Iraq	National Resolution	2005

=== Decorations ===
- Presidential Unit Citation (Army), Streamer embroidered PLEIKU PROVINCE (Headquarters and Headquarters Battery, 1st Cavalry Division Artillery, cited; DA GO 40, 1967)
- Valorous Unit Award, Streamer embroidered FISH HOOK (Headquarters and Headquarters Battery, 1st Cavalry Division Artillery, cited; DA GO 43, 1972)
- Meritorious Unit Commendation (Army), Streamer embroidered VIETNAM 1966–1967 (Headquarters and Headquarters Battery, 1st Cavalry Division Artillery, cited; DA GO 17, 1968)
- Meritorious Unit Commendation (Army), Streamer embroidered VIETNAM 1967–1969 (Headquarters and Headquarters Battery, 1st Cavalry Division Artillery, cited; DA GO 36, 1970)
- Meritorious Unit Commendation (Army), Streamer embroidered SOUTHWEST ASIA (Headquarters and Headquarters Battery, 1st Cavalry Division Artillery, cited; DA GO 27, 1994)
- Philippine Presidential Unit Citation, Streamer embroidered 17 OCTOBER 1941 TO 4 JULY 1945 (1st Cavalry Division cited; DA GO 47, 1950)
- Republic of Korea Presidential Unit Citation, Streamer embroidered WAEGWAN-TAEGU (Headquarters and Headquarters Battery, 1st Cavalry Division Artillery, cited; DA GO 35, 1951)
- Chryssoun Aristion Andrias (Bravery Gold Medal of Greece), Streamer embroidered KOREA (Headquarters and Headquarters Battery, 1st Cavalry Division Artillery, cited; DA GO 2, 1956)
- Republic of Vietnam Cross of Gallantry, with Palm, Streamer embroidered VIETNAM 1965–1969 (Headquarters and Headquarters Battery, 1st Cavalry Division Artillery, cited; DA GO 59, 1969)
- Republic of Vietnam Cross of Gallantry, with Palm, Streamer embroidered VIETNAM 1969–1970 (Headquarters and Headquarters Battery, 1st Cavalry Division, Artillery, cited; DA GO 42, 1972, as amended by DA GO 11, 1973)
- Republic of Vietnam Cross of Gallantry, with Palm, Streamer embroidered VIETNAM 1970–1971 (Headquarters and Headquarters Battery, 1st Cavalry Division, Artillery, cited; DA GO 42, 1972)
- Republic of Vietnam Civil Action Honor Medal, First Class, Streamer embroidered VIETNAM 1969–1970 (Headquarters and Headquarters Battery, 1st Cavalry Division Artillery, cited; DA GO 42, 1972)

== See also ==
- Korean War
  - Battle of Inchon
- Vietnam War
  - Battle of Ia Drang
- Airmobile
- Field Artillery Branch (United States)
- Field artillery
- 1st Cavalry Division (United States)
  - 82nd Field Artillery Regiment
