= John N. Abrams =

United States Army general

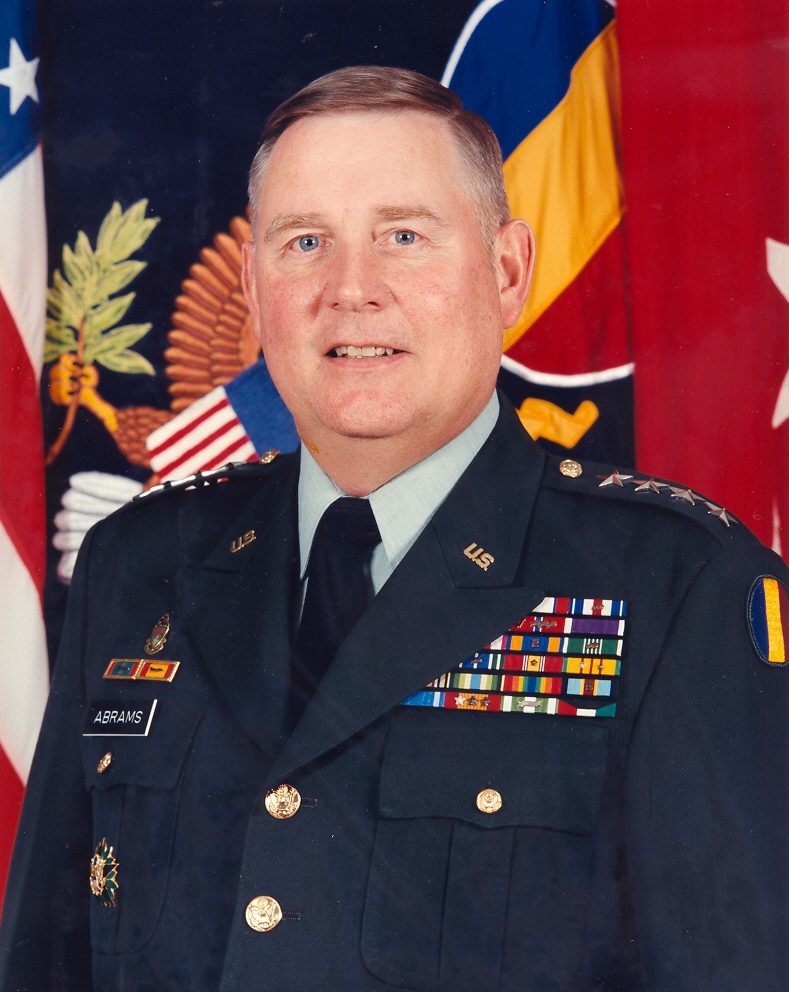
- Official portrait, 1998
- Born: 3 September 1946; Fort Knox, Kentucky, U.S.
- Died: 20 August 2018 (aged 71); Walter Reed National Military Medical Center, Washington, D.C., U.S.
- Burial place: Arlington National Cemetery
- Spouse: Cecilia Bosico (m. 1969)
- Relatives: General Creighton Abrams (father); Brigadier General Creighton W. Abrams III (brother); General Robert B. Abrams (brother)
- Military career
- Allegiance: United States
- Branch: United States Army
- Service years: 1966–2002
- Rank: General
- Commands: Training and Doctrine Command; V Corps; 2nd Infantry Division; Joint Task Force Kuwait; 11th Armored Cavalry Regiment
- Conflicts: Vietnam War; Gulf War; Operation Joint Endeavor
- Awards: Army Distinguished Service Medal (2); Silver Star (2); Legion of Merit (3); Bronze Star Medal (4); Purple Heart
- Other work: Military analyst, Associated Press

General John Nelson Abrams (3 September 1946 – 20 August 2018) was a United States Army four-star general who commanded the United States Army Training and Doctrine Command from 1998 to 2002.

== Early life and career ==
Abrams was born at Fort Knox, Kentucky, on 3 September 1946, the son of General Creighton Abrams and Julia (Harvey) Abrams. He graduated from Frankfurt American High School in 1964, and attended Bowling Green University before deciding to enlist in the United States Army.

Abrams enlisted in the United States Army on 16 January 1966, and after completion of his initial training, he attended Officer Candidate School. He graduated on 3 February 1967, with a commission as a second lieutenant of Armor. Abrams was assigned to 2nd Squadron, 1st Cavalry Regiment at Fort Hood during its training prior to deploying to Vietnam. His Vietnam War combat assignments with the squadron from 1967 to 1969 included platoon leader for B Troop, executive officer for A Troop, commander of A Troop, commander of C Troop, and commander of the squadron's Provisional Rifle Company.

== Education ==
Abrams received his Bachelor of Science degree in business administration from Bowling Green University in 1972. He received a Master of Science degree in public administration from Shippensburg University in 1986 as part of his completion of the United States Army War College. In 2002, he received the honorary degree of Doctor of Philosophy in Military Education and Training from Norwich University.

== Continued career ==
Abrams' post-Vietnam assignments included instructor in military science at the United States Military Academy beginning in 1972. In 1976, he graduated from the United States Army Command and General Staff College at Fort Leavenworth. He commanded 1st Squadron, 11th Armored Cavalry Regiment from 1983 to 1985. Abrams graduated from the United States Army War College in 1986, and then served as assistant chief staff for plans and operations G-3 for the 3rd Armored Division, followed by promotion to colonel and assignment as division chief staff from 1986 to 1988. From 1988 to 1990, Abrams commanded the 11th Armored Cavalry Regiment. From 1990 to 1991 he was deputy director for operations, readiness and modernization in the Army's Office of the Deputy Chief Staff for Operations and Plans.

== General officer ==
After promotion to brigadier general, Abrams served as assistant division commander for the 1st Cavalry Division from 1991 to 1993. From 1993 to 1995, he was commander of the 2nd Infantry Division as a major general. Abrams was promoted to lieutenant general in 1995 and assigned as commander of V Corps, which included participation in Operation Joint Endeavor.

He was deputy commander of the Army's Training and Doctrine Command from 1997 to 1998, and received promotion to general and assignment as TRADOC's commander in 1998. He served until retiring in 2002.

== Awards and decorations ==
Abrams' awards and decorations included: He was inducted into the U.S. Army Officer Candidate School Hall of Fame in 2001.

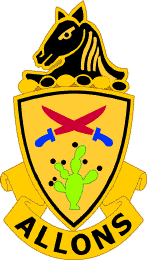
Army Staff Identification Badge
11th Armored Cavalry Regiment Distinctive Unit Insignia

Army Distinguished Service Medal with oak leaf cluster
Silver Star with oak leaf cluster
Legion of Merit with two oak leaf clusters
Bronze Star with Valor Device and three oak leaf clusters
Purple Heart
Meritorious Service Medal
Air Medal with award numeral 2
Army Commendation Medal with oak leaf cluster
Army Achievement Medal with oak leaf cluster
National Defense Service Medal with two bronze service stars
Vietnam Service Medal with one silver and one bronze service star
Southwest Asia Service Medal with 1 bronze service star
Armed Forces Service Medal
Army Service Ribbon
Overseas Service Ribbon with Award numeral 5
NATO Medal for Former Yugoslavia
Vietnam Gallantry Cross with silver star and two bronze stars
Order of Merit of the Federal Republic of Germany, Knight Commander's Cross
Gallantry Cross Unit Citation Ribbon
Civil Actions Unit Citation Ribbon
Vietnam Campaign Medal
Kuwait Liberation Medal (Kuwait)

== Post-military ==
After retiring, Abrams became a military analyst for the Associated Press. He was the president and chief executive officer of John Abrams Learning & Information Systems, Inc., a consulting and technology firm.

Abrams died at Walter Reed National Military Medical Center in Bethesda, Maryland, on 20 August 2018. He was buried at Arlington National Cemetery.

== Family ==
Abrams was the son of Julia Berthe Harvey (1915–2003) and General Creighton W. Abrams Jr. His brothers Creighton III and Robert were also army general officers.

He married Cecilia Bosico in 1969. They were the parents of two daughters.

== Images gallery ==
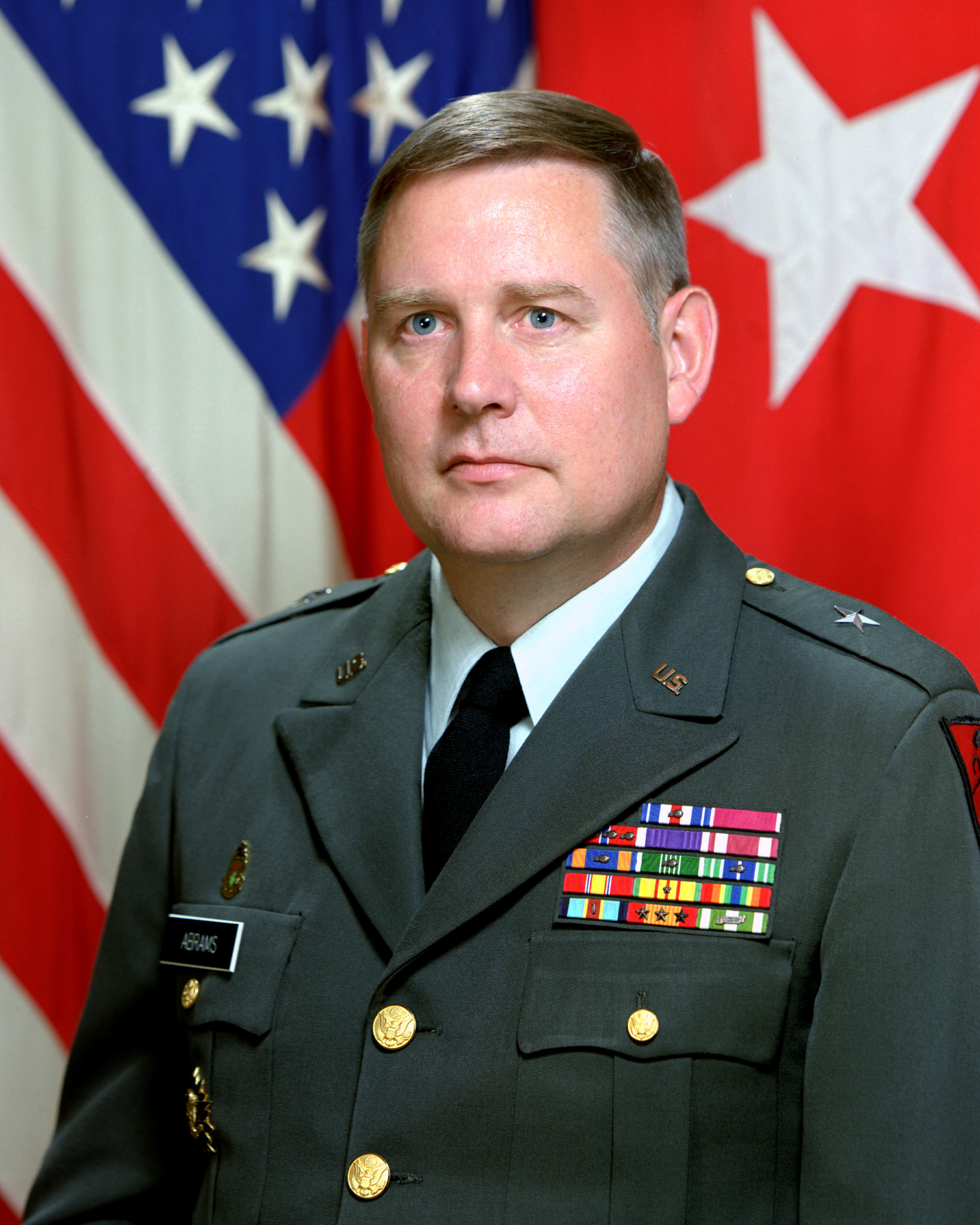
Abrams as a brigadier general in 1990 while serving in the Army's Office of the Deputy Chief Staff for Operations and Plans

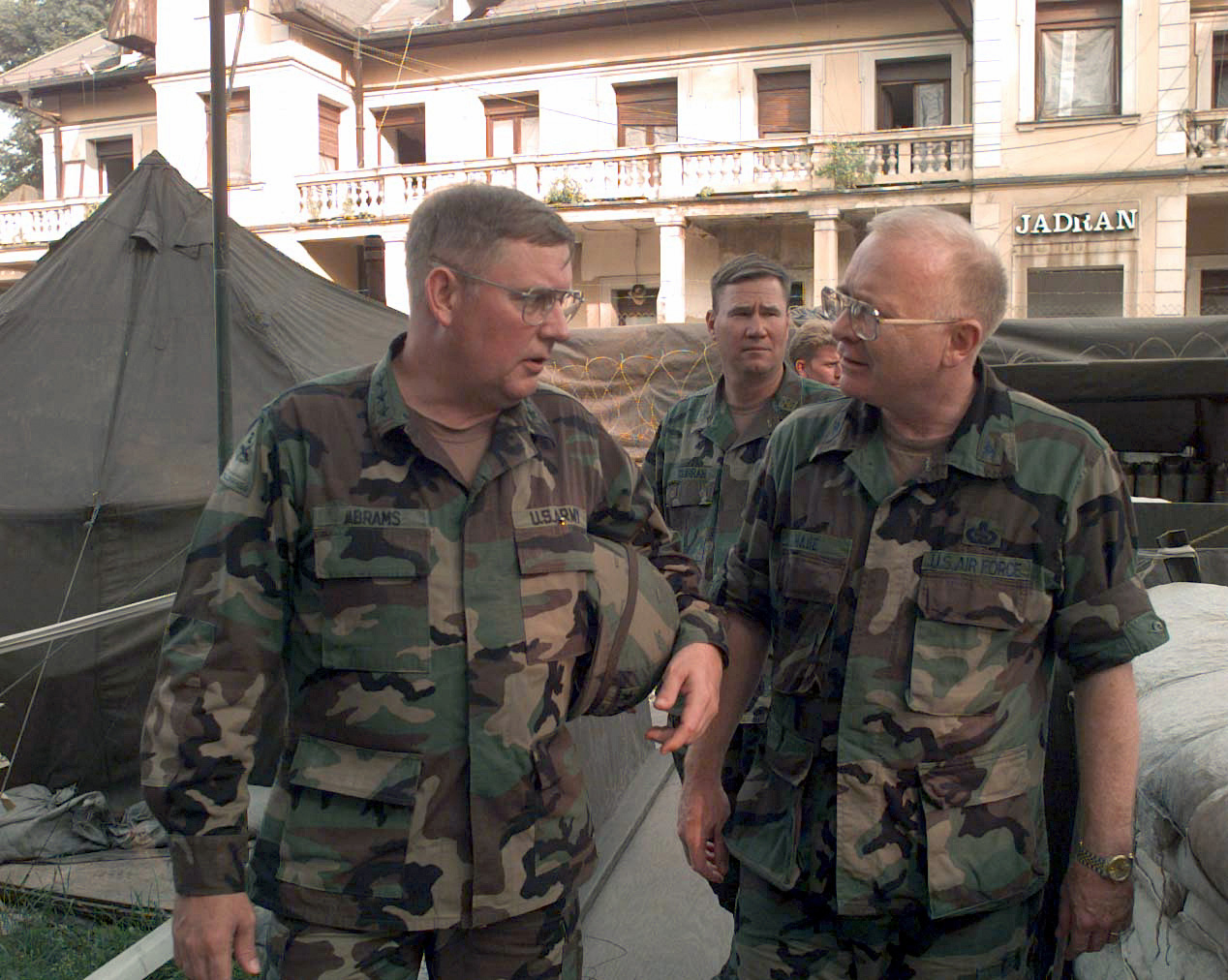
Colonel Jeffrey Hage of the United States National Intelligence Center (USNIC) in Bosnia escorts Abrams through the center during Operation Joint Endeavor in 1996

Military offices
Preceded by William W. Hartzog	Commander, U.S. Army Training and Doctrine Command; 1998—2002	Succeeded by Kevin P. Byrnes
