= Army Staff Identification Badge =

United States Army identification badge

- Type: Identification badge
- Awarded for: One year of service while assigned to the Army Staff.
- Description: The Arms of the United States in gold with the stripes of the shield to be enameled white and red and chief of the shield and the sky of the glory to be enameled blue, superimposed on a five-pointed black enameled star; in each reentrant angle of the star are three green enameled laurel leaves.
- Presented by: Chief of Staff of the Army
- Eligibility: officers and sergeants major assigned to authorized positions at Headquarters, Department of the Army.
- Formerly called: Army General Staff Identification Badge
- Status: Currently awarded
- Established: July 28, 1933
- Related: Headquarters Air Force Badge and Commandant Staff Badge

The Army Staff Identification Badge is an identification badge awarded by the Chief of Staff of the Army to officers, warrant officers, and enlisted soldiers assigned to authorized positions at Headquarters, Department of the Army.

== History ==
General Douglas MacArthur first proposed an Army General Staff Badge in 1931, but it was not until 1933 that the War Department authorized it. The badge has remained unchanged in appearance since it was first created, but the name was changed in 1982 from the Army General Staff Identification Badge to the Army Staff Identification Badge, and the eligibility criteria have evolved.

On a United States Army uniform, the Army Staff Identification Badge is worn centered on the right breast pocket; however, per ALARACT 203/2010 wear of the Army Staff Identification Badge is authorized on the left breast pocket when worn in conjunction with a deployment CSIB (Combat Service Identification Badge)

A similar Army Staff Lapel Pin is authorized for civilian employees of the Department of the Army, regardless of grade, who fill an eligible position in an HQDA agency for no less than one year.
