= William R. Richardson =

American Army general (1929–2023)

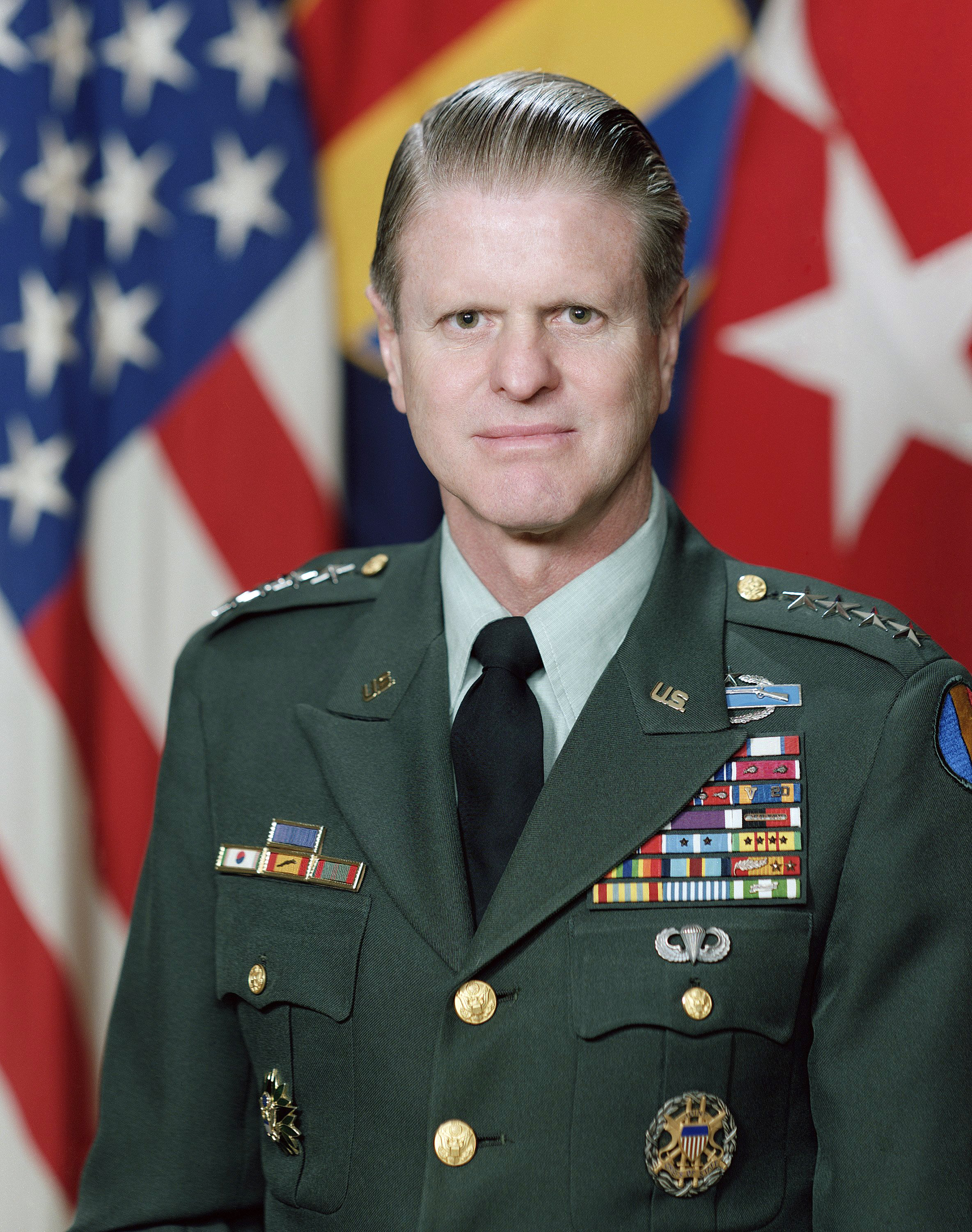
- Richardson in 1984
- Born: 25 March 1929; Taizhou, Jiangsu, China
- Died: 15 November 2023 (aged 94); McLean, Virginia, U.S.
- Burial place: Arlington National Cemetery
- Military career
- Allegiance: United States
- Branch: United States Army
- Service years: 1951–1986
- Rank: General
- Commands: United States Army Training and Doctrine Command; United States Army Combined Arms Center; 193rd Infantry Brigade; 198th Infantry Brigade; 3rd Battalion, 39th Infantry Regiment
- Conflicts: Korean War; Vietnam War
- Awards: Army Distinguished Service Medal (2); Air Force Distinguished Service Medal; Silver Star (2); Legion of Merit (3); Distinguished Flying Cross; Bronze Star Medal with "V" (4); Purple Heart
- Other work: Vice President, Burdeshaw Associates, Ltd. Board of Advisors, National Infantry Foundation

General William Rowland Richardson (25 March 1929 – 15 November 2023) was a United States Army four-star general and former commander of the United States Army Training and Doctrine Command.

== Early life ==
William Rowland Richardson was born in Taizhou, Jiangsu, China, on 25 March 1929, to missionary parents. Richardson graduated from the United States Military Academy in 1951 and was commissioned in the Infantry. His initial assignment was with the 24th Infantry Division on occupation duty in Japan.

== Military career ==
Richardson was deployed to Korea in 1953 with the 7th Infantry Division. After the end of the Korean War, he subsequently served in various staff positions before taking command of the 3rd Battalion, 39th Infantry Regiment, 9th Infantry Division in 1966. He deployed with his battalion to Vietnam, and later was assigned as the assistant chief of staff, G-3, of the 9th Infantry Division. He returned to Vietnam in June 1971 as the commander of the 198th Infantry Brigade, Americal Division, and later became the Division Chief of Staff. In 1972 he became the Assistant Commandant of the Infantry School at Ft Benning, Georgia. In 1974 he served as commander of the 193rd Infantry Brigade in the Panama Canal Zone from December 1974 to June 1977. He followed his second brigade command as the director of requirements on the Army Staff from 1977 to 1979.

As commander of 3rd Battalion, 39th Infantry, touring the village of Rach Kien, Vietnam, with United States Ambassador to the United Nations Arthur Goldberg, 1967

Richardson served as commander of the Combined Arms Center and commandant of the Command and General Staff College at Fort Leavenworth from 1979 to 1981. He was the deputy chief of staff for operations and plans from 1981 to 1983, and in 1983, he became commander of the United States Army Training and Doctrine Command, retiring from this position in 1986.

Richardson's education includes the Canadian Army Staff College, the Armed Forces Staff College, the Industrial College of the Armed Forces, and a master's degree from the George Washington University. His awards and decorations include the Army Distinguished Service Medal with one Oak Leaf Cluster, the Air Force Distinguished Service Medal, the Silver Star with Oak Leaf Cluster, the Legion of Merit with two Oak Leaf Clusters, the Distinguished Flying Cross, the Bronze Star Medal with "V" device and three Oak Leaf Clusters, the Purple Heart, the Combat Infantryman Badge, and the Republic of Korea Order of National Security Merit, Tong II Medal.

== Later life ==
After retirement, Richardson became executive vice president, army programs at Burdeshaw Associates, Ltd., a position he filled until 1995, when he became a BAL Senior Associate. He serves on the board of advisors of the National Infantry Foundation. He is a senior associate and on the board of directors of O'Connell and Associates, a defense consulting firm. In February 2007 he was named to the board of trustees of the Command and General Staff College Foundation. He also serves on the board of advisors of the Code of Support Foundation, a nonprofit military services organization.

Richardson was awarded the Doughboy Award in 1999 by the Infantry Center and was inducted into the Fort Leavenworth Hall of Fame in 2008.

Richardson died from complications of Alzheimer's disease in McLean, Virginia, on 15 November 2023. He was 94.

Military offices
Preceded by John R. Thurman III	Commandants of the United States Army Command and General Staff College; 1979–1981	Succeeded by Howard F. Stone
Preceded by Glenn K. Otis	Commanding General, United States Army Training and Doctrine Command; 1983—1986	Succeeded by Carl E. Vuono
