= Jack N. Merritt =

United States general (1930–2018)

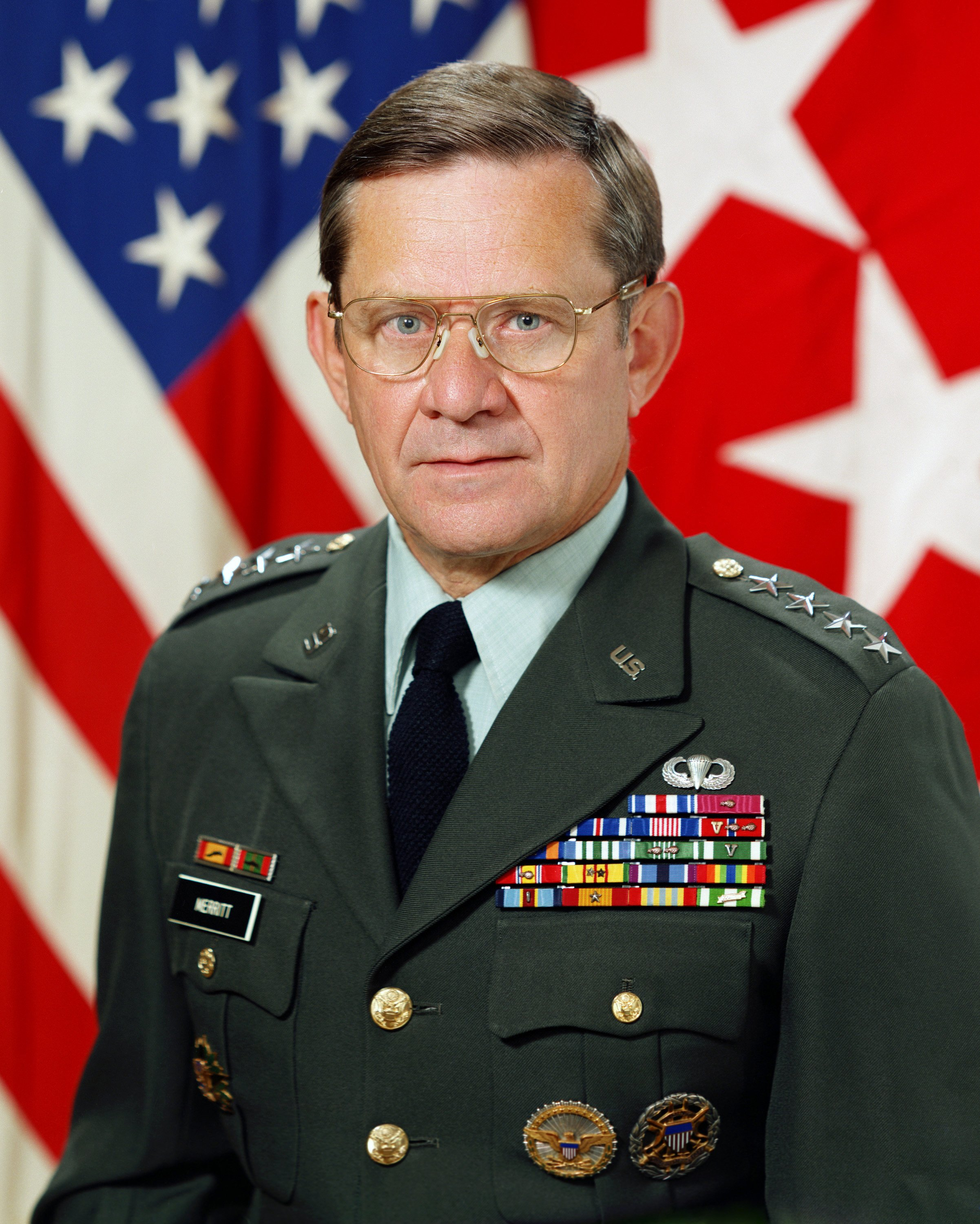
- General Jack N. Merritt
- Born: 23 October 1930; Lawton, Oklahoma, U.S.
- Died: 3 January 2018 (aged 87); Fort Belvoir, Virginia, U.S.
- Military career
- Allegiance: United States of America
- Branch: United States Army
- Service years: 1952–1987
- Rank: General
- Commands: Artillery Center and School; Army War College; Combined Arms Center
- Conflicts: Korean War; Vietnam War
- Awards: Army Distinguished Service Medal; Defense Distinguished Service Medal; Silver Star; Legion of Merit (2)
- Other work: President, Association of the United States Army; Chairman, United States Field Artillery Association

Jack Neil Merritt (23 October 1930 – 3 January 2018) was a United States Army four-star general who served as U.S. Military Representative, NATO Military Committee (USMILREP) from 1985 to 1987.

== Military career ==
Merritt was born in Lawton, Oklahoma and entered the Army as a private in 1952 at the height of the Korean War and over the next thirty-five years rose to 4-star rank. From battery command in Korea to the 1st Cavalry Division Artillery at Fort Hood, Texas, he commanded at every level in the Field Artillery. His final assignment was as United States Military Representative to the NATO Military Committee from 1985 to 1987.

Merritt was the Honor Graduate of his Officer Candidate School class in 1953. He later earned a Bachelor of General Education degree in military science from the University of Nebraska at Omaha and a Master of Science degree in business administration from George Washington University. Merritt was also top graduate of his Artillery Advance Course, Distinguished Graduate of the Air Command and Staff College and Distinguished Graduate of the Industrial College of the Armed Forces. Moreover, his career touched the entire Army school system. In 1977 he served on the general officer study group that reviewed the West Point honor code and he commanded the Artillery Center and School (1977–80), the Army War College (1980–82) and the Combined Arms Center including the Command and General Staff College (1983).

He also served on the National Security Council staff and had additional assignments on Joint Staff and was the U.S. Military Representative to the NATO Military Committee.

His decorations include the Defense Distinguished Service Medal (one oak leaf cluster), Army Distinguished Service Medal (one oak leaf cluster), Silver Star and Legion of Merit (one oak leaf cluster).

- Defense Distinguished Service Medal
- Army Distinguished Service Medal
- Silver Star
- Legion of Merit
- Distinguished Flying Cross
- Soldier's Medal
- Bronze Star with V Device and two oak leaf clusters
- Air Medal
- Joint Service Commendation Medal
- Army Commendation Ribbon
- Navy and Marine Corps Commendation Medal with V Device

== Post military career ==
After retirement, he served as president of the Association of the United States Army and chairman of the United States Field Artillery Association. He has also served on the board of directors of the Army and Air Force Mutual Aid Association, the Honorary Board of the National World War II Museum, and secretary to the board of directors of the Marshall Legacy Institute.

== Personal ==
Merritt married Rosemary Ralston (18 December 1928 – 1 February 2019) on 31 October 1953, at Fort Sill, Oklahoma. The couple had three sons, six grandchildren, and, as of 2019, three great-grandchildren.

Merritt died on 4 January 2018, at the age of 87 at his home in Fort Belvoir, Virginia. He was interred at Arlington National Cemetery on 18 May 2018 and his wife was buried beside him on 17 April 2019.

Military offices
Preceded by Howard F. Stone	Commandant of the United States Army Command and General Staff College; June 26, 1982 - June 6, 1983	Succeeded by Carl E. Vuono
