= Gordon R. Sullivan =

American general (1937–2024)

Gordon Sullivan
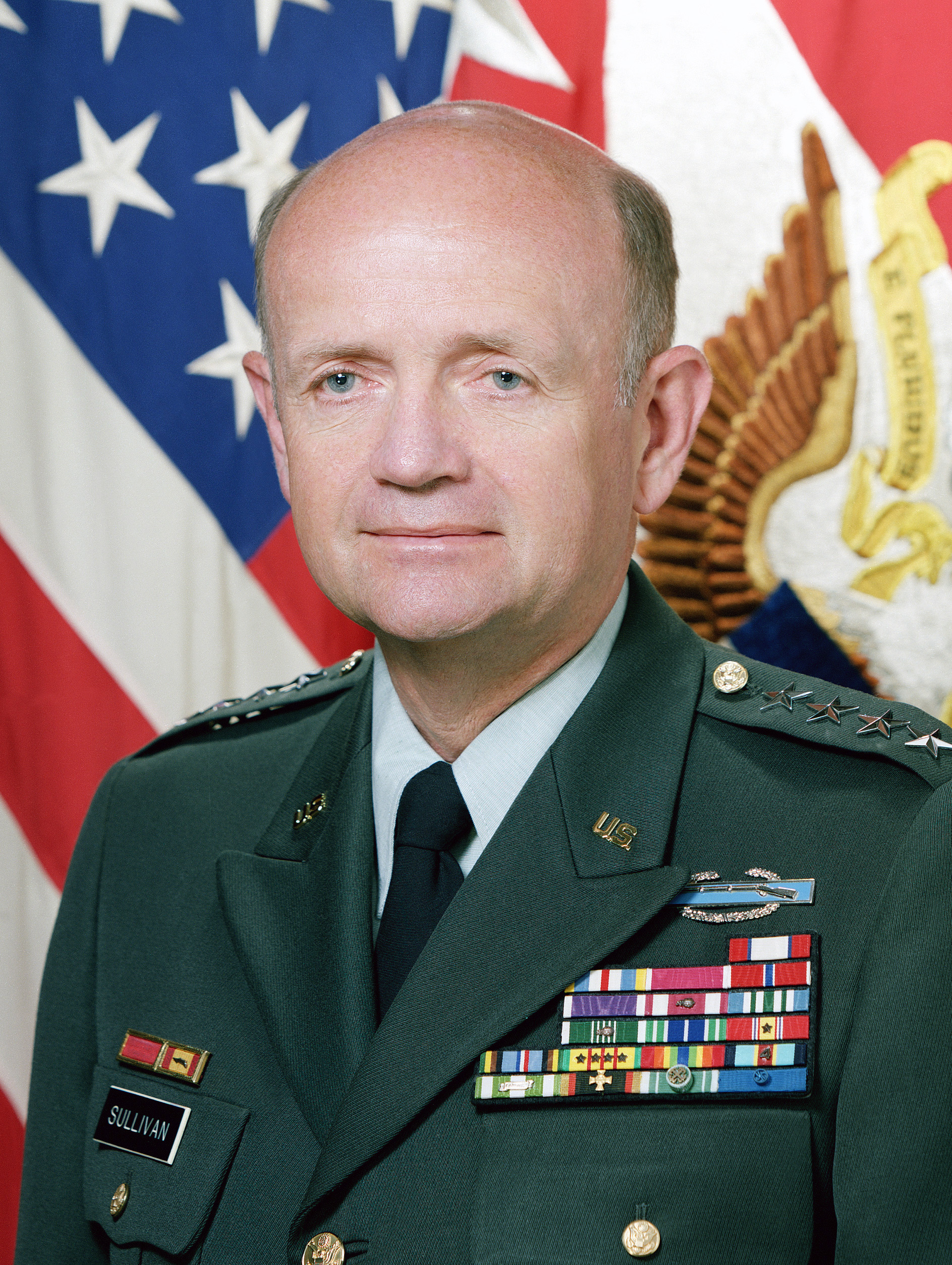
- Official portrait, 1992
- Born: 25 September 1937; Boston, Massachusetts, U.S.
- Died: 2 January 2024 (aged 86)
- Burial place: Arlington National Cemetery
- Military career
- Allegiance: United States
- Branch: United States Army
- Service years: 1959–1995
- Rank: General
- Commands: Chief of Staff of the United States Army; Vice Chief of Staff of the United States Army; 1st Infantry Division (Mechanized); 1st Brigade, 3rd Armored Division; 4th Battalion, 73rd Armor Regiment
- Conflicts: Vietnam War
- Awards: Defense Distinguished Service Medal; Army Distinguished Service Medal (2); Defense Superior Service Medal; Legion of Merit; Bronze Star Medal; Purple Heart
- Other work: President, Association of the United States Army

Gordon Russell Sullivan (25 September 1937 – 2 January 2024) was an American general who served as the 32nd chief of staff of the United States Army from 1991 to 1995, and as the acting United States secretary of the Army in 1993. Sullivan was commissioned into the Armor Branch in 1959 through Norwich University's Army Reserve Officers' Training Corps. Early in his career, he served a tour in South Korea and two tours during the Vietnam War. He was a military advisor to South Vietnam during his first combat tour, from 1963 to 1964. He was later a staff officer there in the late 1960s. Sullivan also served four tours in West Germany, where he was a staff officer and a company, battalion, and brigade commander.

As a general officer, Sullivan was the deputy commander of the United States Army Armor School from 1983 to 1985 and of the Army Command and General Staff College from 1987 to 1988. He was also the commanding general of the 1st Infantry Division from 1988 to 1989, and then served as deputy chief of staff for operations and plans of the United States Army from 1989 to 1990. He then became the 22nd vice chief of staff of the United States Army. As the chief of staff from 1991, Sullivan presided over one of the largest force reductions in Army history, in terms of soldiers, bases, and posts. He oversaw the restructuring of the Army as it shifted from its Cold War focus on a land war in Europe or Asia to interventions in other parts of the world. Also during his tenure, Army troops were deployed for peacekeeping missions in several areas, including Somalia and Haiti.

After retiring from the Army in 1995, Sullivan worked in several organizations. He served as the president and chief executive of the Association of the United States Army from 1998 to 2016. He had also been the chairman of the boards of the Army Historical Foundation and the Marshall Legacy Institute. Sullivan died in 2024 at the age of 86.

== Early life and education ==
Sullivan was born in Boston, Massachusetts on 25 September 1937, the son of Russell E. Sullivan and Penuel E. (Gordon) Sullivan. He was raised in nearby Quincy, and he graduated from Braintree's Thayer Academy in 1955. He received a Bachelor of Arts degree in history from Norwich University in 1959. Sullivan took part in the Army Reserve Officers' Training Corps while at Norwich and at graduation he received his commission as a second lieutenant of Armor.

Sullivan held a Master of Arts degree in political science from the University of New Hampshire. His professional military education included the United States Army Armor School Officer Basic and Advanced Courses, the United States Army Command and General Staff College, and the United States Army War College.

== Army career ==
After commissioning, Sullivan attended the Armor Officer Basic Course at Fort Knox, Kentucky, before he was assigned to 1st Battalion, 66th Armor Regiment, 2nd Armored Division, at Fort Hood, Texas. He oversaw the advanced individual training of soldiers in his battalion on the M48 tank, and also in other areas. In February 1960 he returned to Fort Knox to attend the communications school. Sullivan was deployed to South Korea in 1961 at a time of ongoing tensions with North Korea and internally due to the possibility of coup attempts. He served in 3rd Battalion, 40th Armor Regiment, 1st Cavalry Division. After his tour there from June 1961 to August 1962, he responded to a call for volunteers for the Vietnam War by chairman of the Joint Chiefs of Staff, General Maxwell Taylor. After a six-week course of Military Advisor Training and Assistance (MATA) course at Fort Bragg, North Carolina, he was sent to Vietnamese language training at Defense Language Institute, Presidio of Monterey, California. In January 1963, he arrived for his first tour in South Vietnam.

As a first lieutenant, Sullivan initially served as an advisor to the 21st Division of the Army of the Republic of Vietnam, and was injured in combat with Viet Cong fighters. He later served as the executive officer to the assistant chief of staff for intelligence (J-2) of the Military Assistance Command, Vietnam (MACV). Sullivan also witnessed the 1963 Vietnamese coup against Ngo Dinh Diem, and worked as an advisor to the South Vietnamese Civil Guard. He returned to the United States in 1964, and as a captain attended the Armor Officer Advanced Course at Fort Knox. After that, he was sent to West Germany, where he served with the 3rd Battalion, 32nd Armor Regiment, 3rd Armored Division. Sullivan was a company commander before becoming as a combat arms assignment officer in October 1966. He sent soldiers to Vietnam as the war there expanded.

Promoted to major in September 1967, he returned to the United States in June 1968 to attend the Army Command and Staff College at Fort Leavenworth, which he graduated in June 1969. Sullivan then served as a staff officer in I Field Force, Vietnam, before being assigned to the Office of Personnel Operations, Actions Section, Armor Branch, at the Pentagon. While there, he was promoted to lieutenant colonel in May 1974. He returned to Europe in January 1975 as commander of the 4th Battalion, 73rd Armor, 1st Infantry Division (Forward). Sullivan was the division chief of staff from August 1976 to June 1977. He then attended the Army War College, graduating in 1978. Promoted to colonel on 1 June 1980, Sullivan became the assistant chief of staff for operations (G-3) of VII Corps in West Germany, until May 1981. He then served as commander of the 1st Brigade, 3rd Armored Division, until 1983, when he became the division's chief of staff. His overseas assignments included four tours in Europe, two in Vietnam and one in Korea.

=== General officer ===
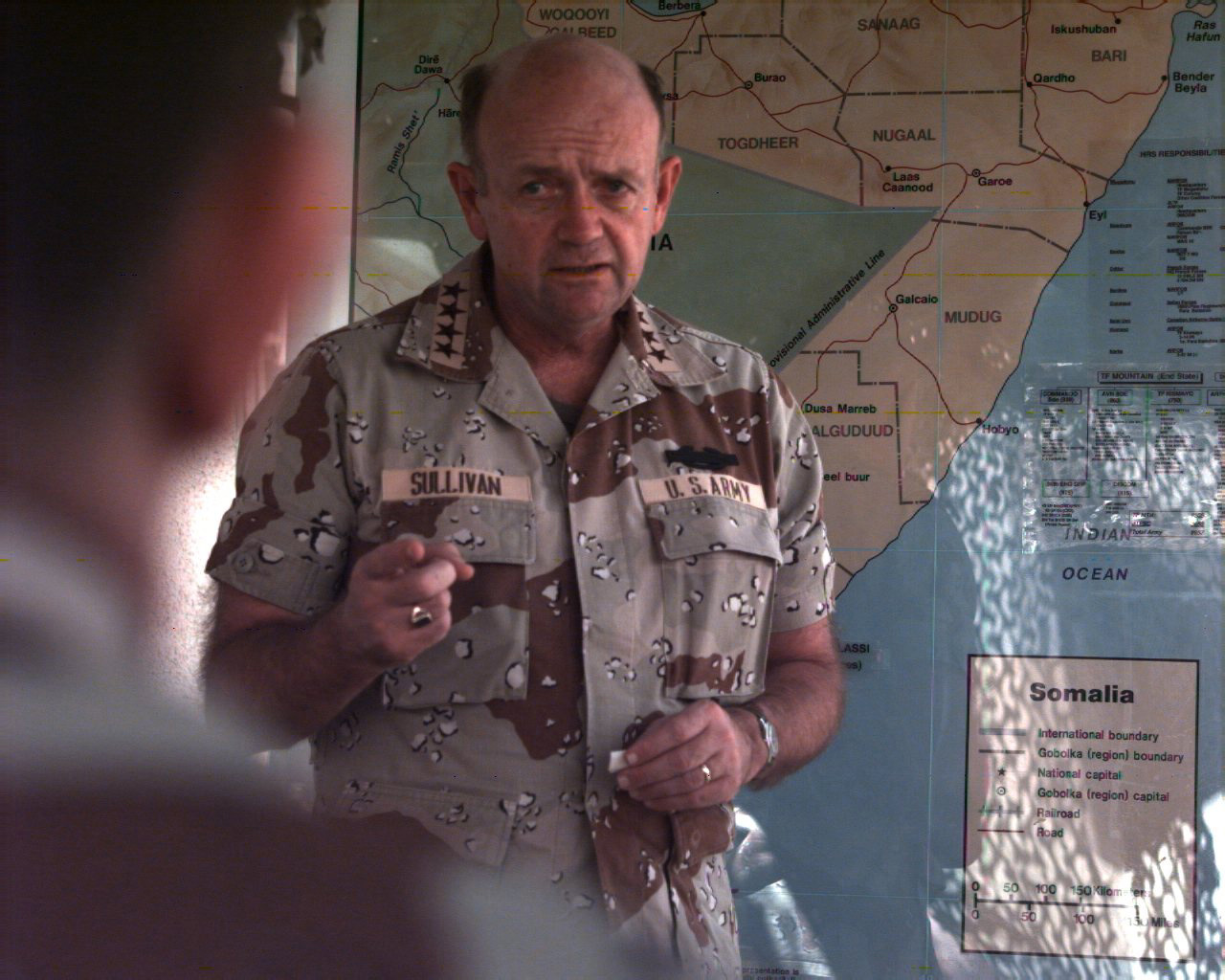
Sullivan at the US Embassy in Mogadishu, Somalia, January 1993

Sullivan was promoted to brigadier general on 1 October 1984. During his career as a general officer, Sullivan served as: assistant commandant, United States Army Armor School at Fort Knox, Kentucky from November 1983 to July 1985; deputy commandant, United States Army Command and General Staff College at Fort Leavenworth, Kansas from March 1987 to June 1988; commanding general, 1st Infantry Division (Mechanized) at Fort Riley, Kansas from June 1988 to July 1989; deputy chief of staff for operations and plans; and 22nd vice chief of staff of the United States Army from 1990 to 1991. He was promoted to major general in October 1987, to lieutenant general in July 1989, and to general in June 1990. The latter promotion came with his appointment to vice chief of staff of the Army.

Sullivan culminated his service in uniform as the 32nd chief of staff of the United States Army. He was nominated in April 1991 by President George H. W. Bush as the successor to General Carl Vuono, and took office on 21 June 1991. He oversaw the restructuring and downsizing of the service after its Cold War and Gulf War years, having created the vision and led the team that transitioned the Army. He presided over one of the largest force reductions in the history of the Army, not only in terms of personnel, but also in posts and bases.

The reduction, as ordered by Defense Secretary Dick Cheney, included a downsizing of 250,000 troops, bringing the Army down to 535,000 in total; cutting active divisions from 18 to 12, and reserve divisions from 10 to 6; and putting off the development of new tanks and helicopters. Instead of focusing on a potential land war in Europe or Asia, the Army planned to maintain a mix of units that could respond to such a conflict but also intervene in other locations around the world. The smaller future Army would be based largely in the United States, and the Army Reserve would be nearly equal in size to the Active Army. Amidst this process, Sullivan worked with the commandant of the United States Marine Corps, General Carl Mundy, to keep the roles of the Army and Marine Corps distinct.

Sullivan with the Army Staff in January 1994

Sullivan also oversaw the implementation of the "Don't ask, don't tell" policy and the expansion of recruitment efforts towards women and minorities. He also authorized the creation of the Battle Staff NCO Course in 1991, took the Sergeants Major Course from six months to nine months, and had a permanent artist start working at the United States Army Center of Military History. Also during his tenure, the Army experienced a significant increase in digital information being used in military technology.

He presided over the deployment of soldiers for peacekeeping missions in Somalia, Haiti, Rwanda, and the Balkans. The shift from Cold War priorities to peacekeeping began a discussion about Army doctrine. In June 1993, amidst ongoing operations in Somalia, Sullivan said that Army leaders were beginning to "wrestle with some of these issues" and "think our way through some of them." That month he revealed the Army's new doctrine to address post-Cold War challenges. Known as Force XXI, the initiative was an effort by Sullivan to start a debate in the Army about its future. Its broad objectives were to develop an organizationally flexible, lighter, and digitized force, which would be capable of launching interventions from bases in the United States and would have total awareness of the battlefield. Launched over half way through Sullivan's term, Force XXI did begin a debate in the Army, but for the remainder of his term there was "no substantial effort to adapt to the chaotic nonstate warfare [the Army] had encountered in Somalia and would encounter again in the Balkans and postinvasion Iraq."

In August 1993, President Bill Clinton assigned the duties and responsibility of acting United States secretary of the Army to Sullivan, who continued to serve as chief of staff, after John W. Shannon was removed. He remained as the acting secretary for three months, until November 1993, when Togo D. West Jr. was confirmed. In July 1994, Sullivan agreed to let women soldiers pilot Army helicopters after pressure from West, as the Clinton administration wanted to open more combat roles to women, in return for keeping them from being in most other front-line combat units.

Sullivan retired from the Army on 31 July 1995, stepping down and being succeeded as chief of staff by General Dennis Reimer, his former vice chief. The military march "Architect of Victory" was dedicated to Sullivan on the occasion of his retirement.

== Later work ==
Sullivan speaking at Joint Base Myer–Henderson Hall in January 2014

Sullivan was the co-author, with Michael V. Harper, of Hope Is Not a Method (Random House, 1996), which chronicles the enormous challenges encountered in downsizing and transforming the post-Cold War army.

Sullivan served as the chairman of the board of trustees of Norwich University, the Army Historical Foundation, and the Marshall Legacy Institute, as well as a member of the MITRE Army Advisory Board, the MIT Lincoln Laboratory Advisory Board, and a Life Trustee of the Woods Hole Oceanographic Institute. He was also the President and chief executive officer of the Association of the United States Army, headquartered in Arlington, Virginia from February 1998 through June 2016. Sullivan was an Advisory Board Member of Spirit of America, a 501(c)(3) organization that supports the safety and success of Americans serving abroad and the local people and partners they seek to help.

In recognition of his military career and his work with AUSA, Sullivan was awarded the prestigious Sylvanus Thayer Award by the United States Military Academy in 2003, and the AUSA General George Catlett Marshall Medal, the Association's highest honor, in October 2016. In April 2016, Sullivan was the first person to be awarded the title of honorary sergeant major of the Army, in recognition of his contributions to the NCO corps. The award was presented by Sergeant Major of the Army Dan Dailey.

=== CNA Military Advisory Board ===
Sullivan served as the first Chairman of the CNA Military Advisory Board, the first group of retired generals and admirals to examine the national security implications of climate change. Founded in 2006 by Sherri Goodman, the CNA Military Advisory board brought together military leaders from the United States Army, Navy, Air Force, and Marine Corps. The landmark report of the CNA Military Advisory Board, National Security and the Threat of Climate Change, established the concept of climate change as a “threat multiplier.” General Sullivan stated in 2007 that the time had arrived to end the debate about climate and take action. When asked about the risk he remarked, “We never have 100 percent certainty. We never have it. If you wait until you have 100 percent certainty, something bad is going to happen on the battlefield.” General Sullivan compared the climate and nuclear threats, stating, “Climate change is exactly the opposite. We have a catastrophic event that appears to be inevitable. And the challenge is to stabilize things—to stabilize carbon in the atmosphere. Back then, the challenge was to stop a particular action. Now, the challenge is to inspire a particular action. We have to act if we’re to avoid the worst effects.”

== Personal life ==
Sullivan was married to Miriam Gay Loftus from 1965 until her death in 2014. He subsequently married Lori Boyle and lived in Falmouth, Massachusetts. Sullivan had three children and three grandchildren. He was an avid reader, historian, sport fisherman, and sailor.

Sullivan died on 2 January 2024, at the age of 86. He was buried at Arlington National Cemetery with military funeral honors on 10 May 2024.

== Awards and decorations ==
Sullivan's awards and decorations included:

Personal decorations
Defense Distinguished Service Medal
Army Distinguished Service Medal with oak leaf cluster
Navy Distinguished Service Medal
Coast Guard Distinguished Service Medal
Defense Superior Service Medal
Legion of Merit
Bronze Star
Purple Heart
Meritorious Service Medal with oak leaf cluster
Joint Service Commendation Medal
Army Commendation Medal with oak leaf cluster
Army Achievement Medal
Unit awards
Meritorious Unit Commendation
Campaign and service medals
National Defense Service Medal with service star
Armed Forces Expeditionary Medal
Vietnam Service Medal with four service stars
Service, training, and marksmanship awards
Army Service Ribbon
Overseas Service Ribbon with award numeral 4
Vietnam Campaign Medal
Foreign awards
Order of Military Merit (Grand Cross) (Brazil)
Officer of the Ordre national du Mérite (France)
Badge of Honour of the Bundeswehr in gold (Germany)
Vietnam Gallantry Cross Unit Citation

Other accoutrements
Combat Infantryman Badge
Office of the Secretary of Defense Identification Badge
Joint Chiefs of Staff Identification Badge
Army Staff Identification Badge

Military offices
Preceded by Leonard P. Wishart III	Commanding General of the 1st Infantry Division; 1988–1989	Succeeded by Thomas Rhame
Preceded by ?	Deputy Chief of Staff for Operations and Plans of the United States Army; 1989–1990	Succeeded by Dennis Reimer
Preceded by Robert W. RisCassi	Vice Chief of Staff of the United States Army; 1990–1991	Succeeded by Dennis Reimer
Preceded by Carl E. Vuono	Chief of Staff of the United States Army; 1991–1995	Succeeded by Dennis Reimer
Preceded by John W. Shannon; Acting	United States Secretary of the Army; Acting; 1993	Succeeded by Togo D. West Jr.
