= Robert W. RisCassi =

American general (born 1936)

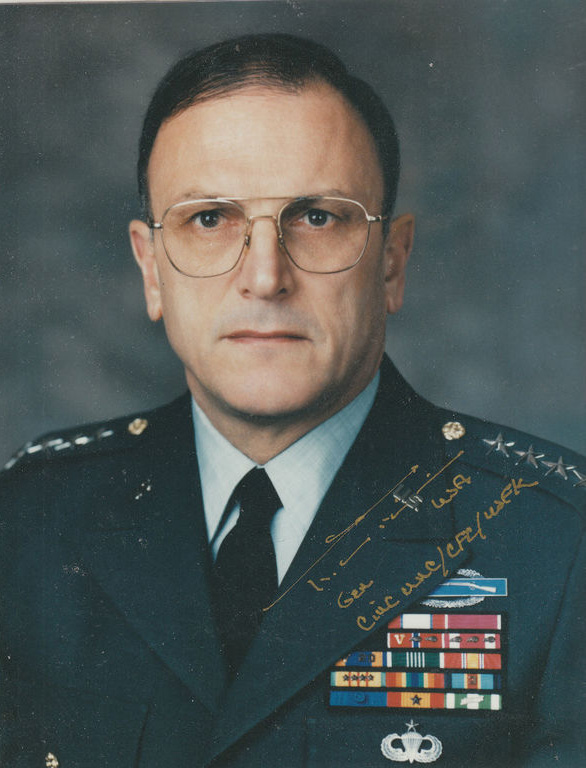
- Robert W. RisCassi as General
- Born: 18 January 1936 (age 90); Hartford, Connecticut, U.S.
- Education: University of Connecticut (BA); Auburn University (MA)
- Military career
- Allegiance: United States
- Branch: United States Army
- Service years: 1958–1993
- Rank: General
- Commands: Vice Chief of Staff of the United States Army; United States Forces Korea; Eighth Army; 9th Infantry Division
- Conflicts: Vietnam War
- Awards: Army Distinguished Service Medal; Defense Distinguished Service Medal; Legion of Merit; Bronze Star (3)

Robert William RisCassi (born 18 January 1936) is an American retired general who served as the 21st vice chief of staff of the United States Army from 1989 to 1990. His previous assignments were as commander of United Nations Command, ROK/US Combined Forces Command, and United States Forces Korea from 1990 to 1993, and concurrently as the commanding general of the US Eighth Army from 1990 to 1992. He also served as director of the Joint Staff from 1987 to 1988, and as deputy chief of staff for operations and plans of the United States Army from 1986 to 1988. RisCassi was born in Hartford, Connecticut, and was commissioned in 1958 through the University of Connecticut Army Reserve Officers' Training Corps. He was deployed during the Vietnam War, and his awards include the Bronze Star with valor.

== Early life and education ==
RisCassi was born on January 18, 1936, in Hartford, Connecticut, and is a 1958 graduate of the University of Connecticut with a Bachelor of Arts degree in history and holds a Master of Arts degree from Auburn University in Political Science. His military education includes the Infantry Officer Basic and Advanced Courses, the Army Command and General Staff College, and the Army War College.

== Army career ==
He received his commission as a second lieutenant in the United States Army in 1958 from the University of Connecticut Army Reserve Officers' Training Corps program. He served in the Vietnam War as chief of plans for the 1st Field Force (G3) before commanding the 4th Battalion, 503rd Infantry Regiment, 173rd Airborne Brigade. After returning to the United States, he served as an Infantry Branch Personnel Management Officer, and then as Military Assistant to the Assistant Secretary of the Army (Financial Management). RisCassi was then sent to Europe, where he commanded the 4th Brigade, 4th Infantry Division; and served as assistant commander of the 8th Infantry Division (Mechanized).

His other assignments include Director of the Joint Staff and Deputy Chief of Staff for Operations and Plans, all in Washington, D.C.; Deputy Commanding General of the United States Army Training and Doctrine Command and Commanding General of the Combined Arms Center at Fort Leavenworth, Kansas; Commander of the 9th Infantry Division (Motorized), Fort Lewis, Washington; Assistant Division Commander of the 8th Infantry Division (Mechanized) in Germany; and Assistant Commandant of the United States Army Infantry School at Fort Benning, Georgia. He was awarded the University of Connecticut Distinguished Alumni Award in 1989.

== Awards and decorations ==
Combat Infantryman Badge
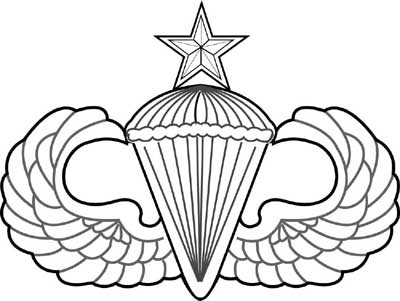
Senior Parachutist Badge
Office of the Secretary of Defense Identification Badge
Joint Chiefs of Staff Identification Badge
Army Staff Identification Badge

Defense Distinguished Service Medal
Distinguished Service Medal with two oak leaf clusters
Legion of Merit
Bronze Star with "V" Device and two oak leaf clusters
Meritorious Service Medal with three oak leaf clusters
Air Medal with V device and numeral 20
Army Commendation Medal
National Defense Service Medal with service star
Vietnam Service Medal with four service stars
Army Service Ribbon
Overseas Service Ribbon with award numeral 3
Officer of the Ordre national du Mérite (France)
Gallantry Cross (Vietnam) with bronze star
Vietnam Campaign Medal

== Post-Army career ==
RisCassi is Vice-President of L-3 Communications Corporation. He served on the Commission on Roles and Missions in 1995, and has been employed as an executive with Loral Corporation and Lockheed Martin. He sits on the boards of Alliant Techsystems, Korea Society, National Intelligence Council, is a member of the SPECTRUM Group's Senior Advisory Group and was a member of the Department of Defense 2001 investigation into the No Gun Ri allegations, and sat on the National Defense Panel in 1997.

== Personal life ==
He is married to Virginia (Dubicki) Riscassi, and they have five children.

Military offices
Preceded by Carl E. Vuono	Commandant of the United States Army Command and General Staff College; 1985–1986	Succeeded by Gerald T. Bartlett
Preceded by Carl E. Vuono	Deputy Chief of Staff for Operations and Plans of the United States Army; 1986–1987	Succeeded by ??
Preceded by Powell F. Carter Jr.	Director of the Joint Staff; 1987–1988	Succeeded by Hansford T. Johnson
Preceded by Arthur E. Brown, Jr.	Vice Chief of Staff of the United States Army; 1989–1990	Succeeded by Gordon R. Sullivan
Preceded by Louis C. Menetrey	Commanding General of the United States Eighth Army; 1990–1992	Succeeded by William W. Crouch
Preceded by Louis C. Menetrey	Commander of United Nations Command; Commander of United States Forces Korea; Commander of ROK/US Combined Forces Command; 1990–1993	Succeeded by Gary E. Luck
