= 9th Infantry Division (United States) =

United States Army unit

- 9th Infantry Division shoulder sleeve insignia
- Active: 8 July 1918–15 February 1919; 24 March 1923–15 January 1947; 15 July 1947–31 January 1962; 1 February 1966–25 September 1969; 21 April 1972–15 December 1991
- Country: United States
- Branch: United States Army
- Type: Infantry
- Size: Division
- Nicknames: Old Reliables; Varsity
- Engagements: World War II; Algeria-French Morocco; Tunisia; Sicily; Normandy; Northern France; Rhineland; Ardennes-Alsace; Central Europe; Vietnam War

Commanders
- Notable commanders: Manton Eddy; Jacob L. Devers; Donald Prentice Booth; Julian Ewell; John Shalikashvili

Insignia
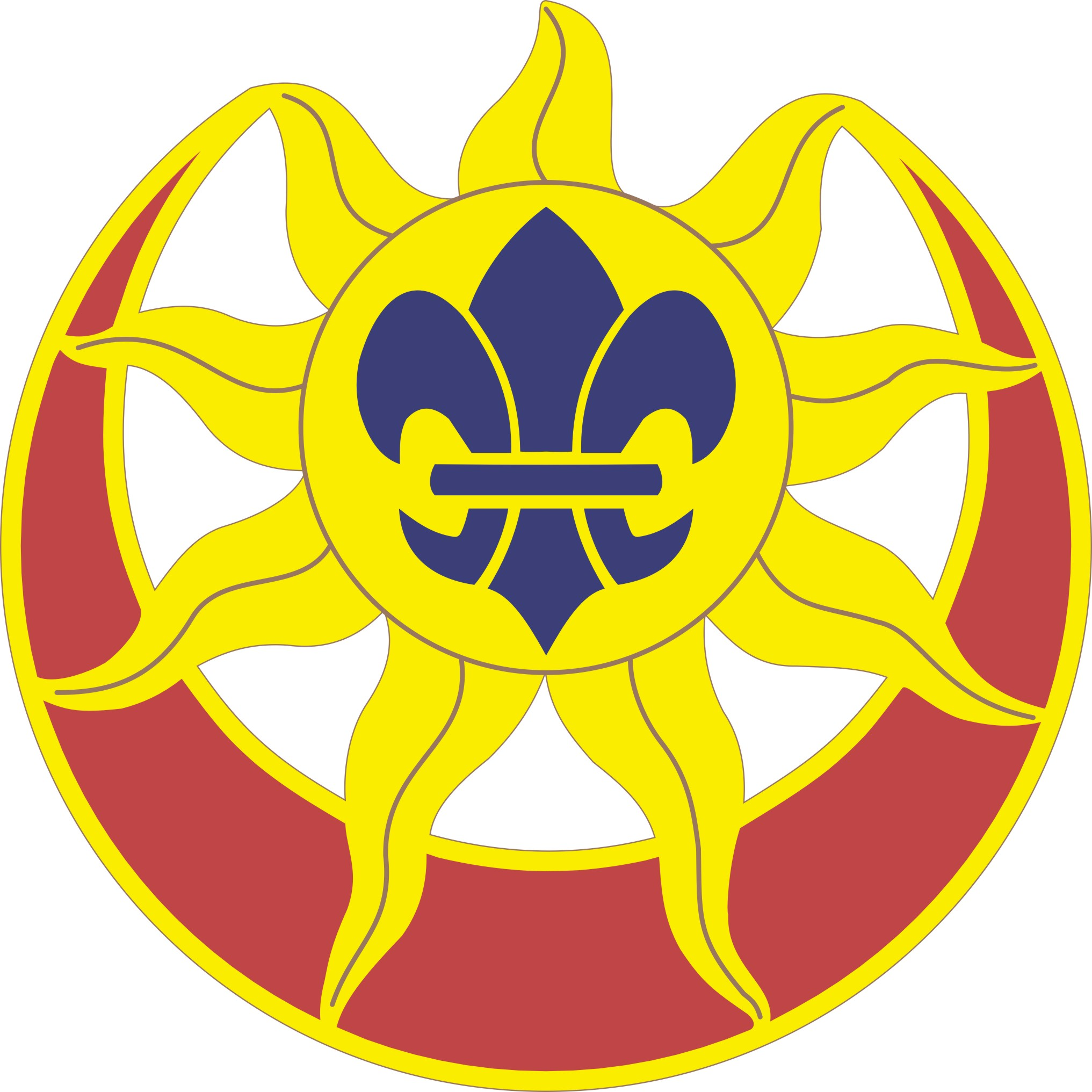
- Distinctive Unit Insignia

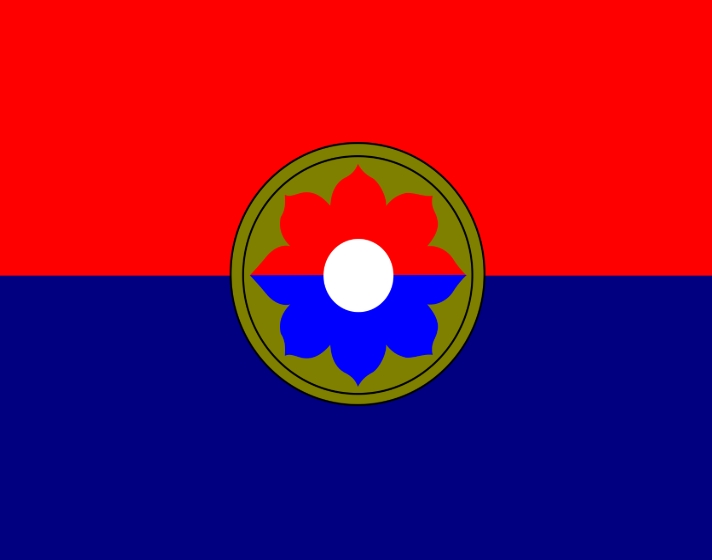
- Flag

The 9th Infantry Division (nicknamed "Old Reliables") is an inactive infantry division of the United States Army. It was formed as the 9th Division during World War I, but never deployed overseas. In later years it was an important unit of the U.S. Army during World War II and the Vietnam War. It was also activated as a peacetime readiness unit from 1947 to 1962 at Fort Dix, New Jersey, as a Training Division, West Germany, and Fort Carson, Colorado, as a Full Combat Status Division, and from 1972 to 1991 as an active-duty infantry division at Fort Lewis, Washington. The division was inactivated in December 1991.

== History ==
=== World War I ===
The 9th Division was part of a group of six divisions (9th-14th) that the War Department directed to be formed in mid-1918 from Regular Army troops augmented by draftees. It was anticipated that the divisions' training would take four months, to be completed by the end of November 1918.

The 9th Division was organized from July to September 1918 at Camp Sheridan, near Montgomery, Alabama. At the end of July, the strength of the division was approximately 8,000 officers and men, while during August, draftees sent from Camp Hancock, Georgia, Camp Meade, Maryland, Camp Zachary Taylor and Fort Thomas, Kentucky, Camp Upton and Fort Slocum, New York, Camp Travis, Texas, and other stations brought the strength to about 22,000. Peak strength was reached during September, with 25,000 officers and men. Systematic training began during August. On 28 October 1918, the division's advance detachment moved to Camp Mills, New York, preparatory to movement overseas. After the signing of the Armistice of 11 November 1918, all training was suspended and the advance detachment returned to Camp Sheridan. Demobilization of all emergency period personnel and units except the 45th and 46th infantry regiments was ordered on 17 January 1919. Demobilization was completed on 15 February 1919.

==== Order of battle ====
- Headquarters, 9th Division
- 17th Infantry Brigade (organized December 1917 at Camp Taylor)
  - 45th Infantry Regiment (organized May 1917 at Fort Benjamin Harrison, Indiana, with cadre from the 10th Infantry)
  - 67th Infantry Regiment (organized July 1918 at Camp Sheridan with cadre from the 45th Infantry)
  - 26th Machine Gun Battalion (organized December 1917 as 23rd Machine Gun Battalion at Camp Taylor with cadres from 45th and 46th Infantry; designation changed same month)
- 18th Infantry Brigade (organized July 1918 at Camp Sheridan)
  - 46th Infantry Regiment (organized June 1917 at Fort Benjamin Harrison with cadre from 10th Infantry as part of 17th Brigade; transferred to 18th Brigade July 1918)
  - 68th Infantry Regiment (organized July 1918 at Camp Sheridan with cadre from 46th Infantry)
  - 27th Machine Gun Battalion (organized July 1918 at Camp Sheridan with cadre from 26th Machine Gun Battalion)
- 9th Field Artillery Brigade (organized August 1918 at Camp McClellan, Alabama)
  - 25th Field Artillery (75 mm gun)
  - 26th Field Artillery (75 mm gun)
  - 27th Field Artillery (155 mm howitzer)
  - 9th Trench Mortar Battery
- 25th Machine Gun Battalion (organized August 1918 at Camp Sheridan)
- 209th Engineer Regiment (organized August 1918 at Camp Forrest, Georgia)
- 209th Field Signal Battalion (organized July 1918 at Camp Sheridan)
- Headquarters Troop, 9th Division (organized July 1918 at Camp Sheridan)
- 9th Train Headquarters and Military Police (organized July 1918 at Camp Sheridan)
  - 9th Ammunition Train (organized August 1918 at Camp McClellan)
  - 9th Engineer Train (organized August 1918 at Camp McClellan)
  - 9th Supply Train (organized September 1918 at Camp Sheridan)
  - 9th Sanitary Train (organized August 1918 at Camp McClellan)
    - 233rd-236th Ambulance Companies and Field Hospitals

=== Interwar period ===
The 9th Division was reconstituted on 24 March 1923, allotted to the First Corps Area for mobilization responsibility, and assigned to the I Corps. Camp Devens, Massachusetts, was designated as the mobilization and training station for the division upon reactivation. The 18th Infantry Brigade and additional active and inactive elements were assigned to the division on 24 March 1923. The division's inactive units were assigned to active associate units for mobilization purposes. During the period 1923–39, the 9th Division was represented in the active Army by the 18th Infantry Brigade and other assorted divisional elements that formed the base force from which the remainder of the division would be reactivated in the event of war. The division headquarters was organized on 28 July 1926 as a Regular Army Inactive (RAI) unit with Organized Reserve personnel at the Army Base, Boston, Massachusetts. In 1926-27, the active associate concept was abandoned and many of the division's inactive elements were organized as RAI units by mid-1927 in the First and Second Corps Areas. The active elements of the division maintained habitual training relationships with divisional RAI units, as well as those of the I Corps, XI Corps, and the 76th, 94th, and 97th Divisions. The RAI and Reserve units often trained with the active elements of the division during summer training camps usually conducted at Camp Devens and Fort McKinley, Maine.

The 18th Infantry Brigade's 5th and 13th Infantry Regiments additionally supported the Reserve units' conduct of the Citizens Military Training Camps also held at Camp Devens and Fort McKinley. When funds were available, the 18th Infantry Brigade and the division's other active elements, which included the 9th Tank Company, 9th Ordnance Company, 9th Quartermaster Regiment, and 25th Field Artillery Regiment, held maneuvers and command post exercises at Camp Devens, during which the division headquarters was occasionally formed in a provisional status. The division headquarters was also provisionally formed in 1939 for the First Army maneuvers in upstate New York. Under the new "triangular" tables of organization, the 9th Division was reactivated, less Reserve personnel, on 1 August 1940 at Fort Bragg, North Carolina, and assigned to the I Corps. Between August and November, the division was increased to a strength of 6,000, and to 8,000 men by January 1941. During January, around 4,500 selectees also arrived, chiefly coming from Camp Upton and Fort Dix. Over the next three months, a further 2,000 were assigned, chiefly from Fort Devens and Fort Dix, allowing the division to reach its war strength of 14,000. The division participated in the Carolina Maneuvers from September–November 1941.

==== Order of battle, 1939 ====
One asterisk following the unit name indicates it was partially active and the headquarters location shown was the mobilization post. Two asterisks following the unit name indicates it was organized with Reserve personnel as an RAI unit. Three asterisks following the unit name indicates it was wholly inactive or not organized and the headquarters location shown was the mobilization post.

- Headquarters** (Army Base, Boston, MA)
- Headquarters, Special Troops** (Boston, MA)
  - Headquarters and Military Police Company** (Boston, MA)
  - 9th Signal Company** (Concord, NH)
  - 5th Ordnance Company (Medium)*** (Fort Devens, MA)
  - 9th Tank Company (Light)** (Fort Devens, MA)
- 17th Infantry Brigade** (Syracuse, NY)
  - 36th Infantry Regiment** (New York City, NY)
  - 37th Infantry Regiment** (Brunswick, NJ)
- 18th Infantry Brigade (Army Base, Boston, MA)
  - 5th Infantry Regiment (Fort Williams, ME)
  - 13th Infantry Regiment (Fort Devens, MA)
- 9th Field Artillery Brigade** (Lawrence, MA)
  - 25th Field Artillery Regiment* (Madison Barracks, NY)
  - 26th Field Artillery Regiment** (Lawrence, MA)
  - 34th Field Artillery Regiment** (Providence, RI)
  - 9th Ammunition Train** (Pittsfield, MA)
- 15th Engineer Regiment** (Fort Devens, MA)
- 9th Medical Regiment** (Ithaca, NY)
- 9th Quartermaster Regiment** (Providence, RI)

=== World War II ===
- Activated: 1 August 1940 at Fort Bragg, North Carolina.
- Overseas: 11 December 1942 (Three organic combat teams participated in North African landings 8 November 1942)
- Campaigns: Algeria-French Morocco, Tunisia, Sicily, Normandy, North France, Rhineland Campaign, Ardennes-Alsace, Central Europe
- Days of combat: 304
- Distinguished Unit Citations: 24
- Awards: Medal of Honor – 5; Distinguished Service Cross – 104; Distinguished Service Medal – 3; Silver Star – 2,282; Legion of Merit – 19; DFC – 2; Soldier's Medal – 100; Bronze Star –6,593; Air Medal – 129

==== Division organization ====
The 9th Infantry Division consisted of the following units:

9th Infantry Division organization (click to enlarge)

- 9th Infantry Division
  - 9th Infantry Division Headquarters
  - 9th Cavalry Reconnaissance Troop (Mechanized) (M3 scout cars and then M8 Greyhound armored cars)
  - 39th Infantry Regiment
    - Headquarters and Headquarters Company
    - 3× Infantry battalions
      - each battalion consists of: 1× Headquarters and Headquarters Company, 3× Rifle companies, 1× Heavy Weapons Company
    - Cannon Company (T12 Gun Motor Carriages and T19 Howitzer Motor Carriages, later replaced by either M3 105mm towed howitzers or M7 Priest self propelled howitzers)
    - Anti-Tank Company (M3 37mm anti-tank guns, which were replaced by 1944 with M1 57mm anti-tank guns)
    - Service Company
  - 47th Infantry Regiment
    - same organization as 39th Infantry Regiment
  - 60th Infantry Regiment
    - same organization as 39th Infantry Regiment
  - 9th Infantry Division Artillery
    - Headquarters and Headquarters Battery
    - 26th Field Artillery Battalion
      - Headquarters and Headquarters Battery
      - 3× Batteries (M2 105mm towed howitzers)
      - Service Battery
    - 34th Field Artillery Battalion
      - Headquarters and Headquarters Battery
      - 3× Batteries (M1 155mm towed howitzers)
      - Service Battery
    - 60th Field Artillery Battalion
      - same organization as 26th Field Artillery Battalion
    - 84th Field Artillery Battalion
      - same organization as 26th Field Artillery Battalion
  - Headquarters Special Troops
    - Headquarters Company, 9th Infantry Division
    - 9th Signal Company
    - 9th Quartermaster Company
    - 709th Ordnance Light Maintenance Company
    - 9th Military Police Platoon
    - 9th Infantry Division Band (attached)
  - 15th Engineer Combat Battalion
    - Headquarters and Headquarters and Service Company
    - 3× Engineer combat companies
  - 9th Medical Battalion
    - Headquarters and Headquarters Detachment
    - 3× Collecting companies
    - Clearing Company

==== Combat chronicle ====
The 9th Infantry Division was among the first U.S. combat units to engage in offensive ground operations during World War II. (The others were the 32nd and the 41st in the Pacific on New Guinea, Carlson's Raiders on Makin Island, the 1st Marine, and the Americal on Guadalcanal, and, alongside the 9th in North Africa, were the 1st Infantry, 3rd Infantry, 34th Infantry and the 2nd Armored Divisions.) The 9th saw its first combat on 8 November 1942, when its elements landed at Algiers, Safi, and Port Lyautey, with the taking of Safi by the 3rd Battalion of the 47th Infantry Regiment standing as the first liberation of a city from Axis control in World War II.

With the collapse of French resistance on 11 November 1942, the division patrolled the Spanish Moroccan border. The 9th returned to Tunisia in February and engaged in small defensive actions and patrol activity. On 28 March 1943 it launched an attack in southern Tunisia and fought its way north into Bizerte, 7 May. In August, the 9th landed at Palermo, Sicily, and took part in the capture of Randazzo and Messina.

Sent to England for further training, the division landed on Utah Beach on 10 June 1944 (D-day plus 4), cut off the Cotentin Peninsula, drove on to Cherbourg Harbour and penetrated the port's heavy defenses.

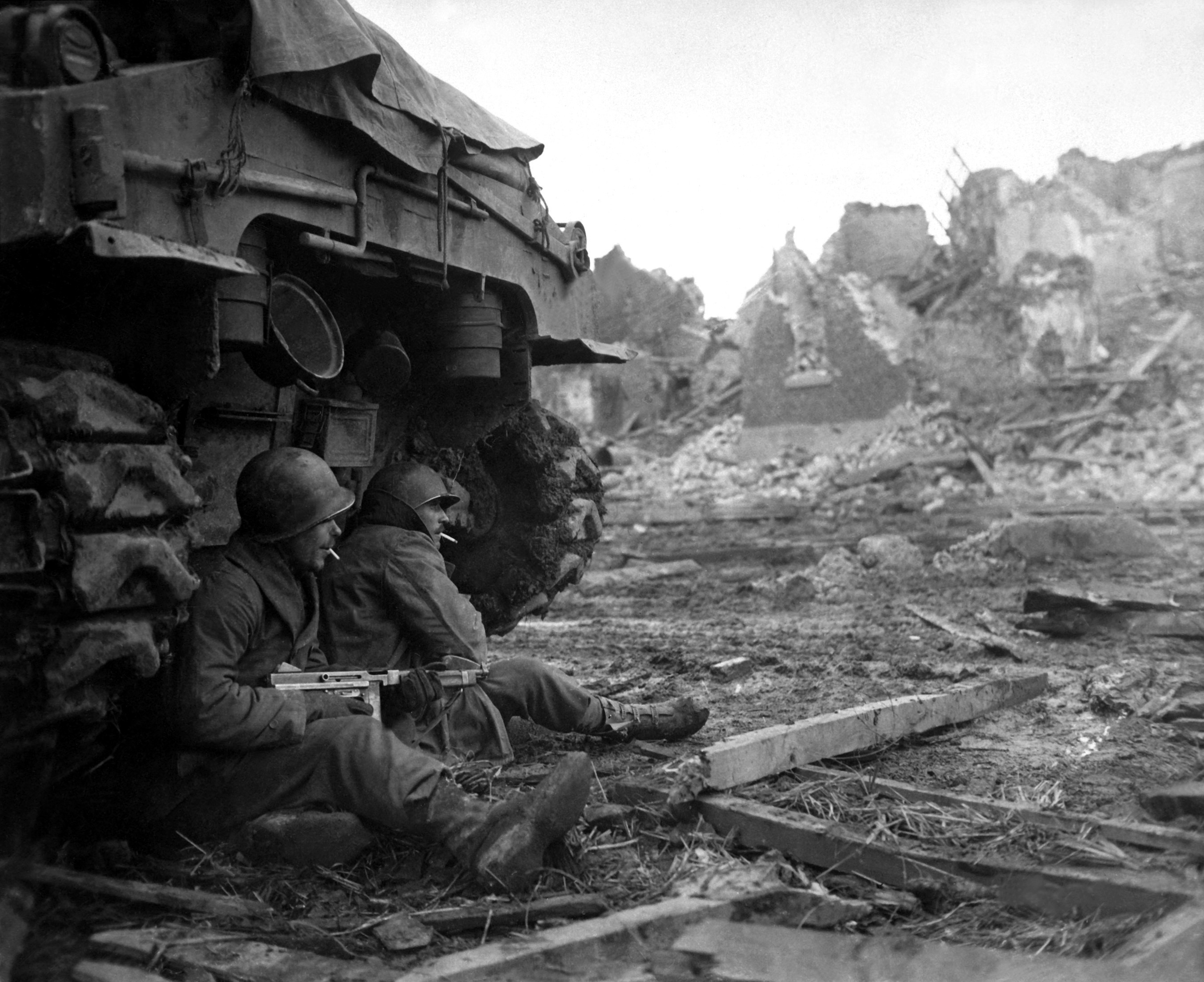
GIs of C Company, 36th Armored Infantry Regiment, 9th Infantry Division at Geich, Germany, 11 December 1944.

Following a brief rest in July, the division took part in the St. Lo break-through and in August helped close the Falaise Gap. Turning east, the 9th crossed the Marne, 28 August, swept through Saarlautern, and in November and December held defensive positions from Monschau to Losheim.

Moving north to Bergrath, Germany, it launched an attack toward the Roer river, 10 December, taking Echtz and Schlich. From mid-December through January 1945, the division held defensive positions from Kalterherberg to Elsenborn. On 30 January the division jumped off from Monschau in a drive across the Roer and to the Rhine, crossing at Remagen, 7 March.

After breaking out of the Remagen bridgehead, the 9th assisted in the sealing and clearing of the Ruhr Pocket, then moved 150 miles (240 km) east to Nordhausen, where it assisted in the liberation of the Mittelbau-Dora concentration camp, and attacked in the Harz Mountains, 14–20 April. On 21 April the Division relieved the 3d Armored Division along the Mulde River, near Dessau, and held that line until VE-day.

After the war, the Division moved south to Ingolstadt. The Division assumed control of the Dachau Concentration Camp in early July.

==== Assignments ====
===== Mediterranean theater of operations =====
- previous: II Corps
- May 1943: I Armored Corps

===== European theater of operations =====
- 20 November 1943: First Army
- 25 November 1943: VII Corps
- 1 August 1944: VII Corps, First Army, 12th Army Group
- 26 October 1944: V Corps
- 6 December 1944: VII Corps
- 18 December 1944: V Corps
- 20 December 1944: Attached, with the entire First Army, to the British 21st Army Group
- 18 January 1945: V Corps, First Army, 12th Army Group
- 17 February 1945: III Corps
- 31 March 1945: VII Corps
- 4 April 1945: III Corps
- 14 April 1945: VII Corps

==== Statistics ====
===== Chronology =====
- Activated 1 August 1940
- Arrived UK 27 November 1943
- Arrived Continent (D+4) 10 June 1944
- Entered Combat 14 June 1944 (First elements in combat in North Africa 8 November 1942; entire division entered combat 26 March 1943)
- Days in Combat 264

===== Casualties =====
- Total battle casualties: 23,277
  - European Theater: 19,719
  - Mediterranean Theater: 3,558
- Killed in action: 3,856
  - European Theater: 3,246
  - Mediterranean Theater: 610
- Wounded in action: 17,416
  - European Theater: 14,874
  - Mediterranean Theater: 2,542
- Missing in action: 357
  - European Theater: 291
  - Mediterranean Theater: 66
- Prisoner of war: 1,648
  - European Theater: 1,308
  - Mediterranean Theater: 340

===== Campaigns =====
- Algeria-French Morocco (Arrowhead device)
- Tunisia
- Sicily
- Normandy
- Northern France
- Rhineland
- Ardennes-Alsace
- Central Europe

===== Individual awards =====
1. Medal of Honor: 4
2. Distinguished Service Cross: 86
3. Legion of Merit: 6
4. Silver Star: 1,789
5. Soldier's Medal: 55
6. Bronze Star: 5,518
7. Distinguished Flying Cross: 1
8. Air Medal: 124

===== Unit awards =====
Presidential Unit Citations:

- Division Artillery Headquarters and Headquarters Battery, for 21–23 February 1943 (WD GO 115, 1946)
- Military Police Platoon, for 9–15 March 1943 (WD GO 84, 1945)
- Company B, 9th Medical Battalion, for 8–19 March 1945 (WD GO 65, 1946)
- 15th Engineer Combat Battalion, for 14 September-23 October 1944 (WD GO 67, 1946)
- Company B, 15th Engineer Combat Battalion, for 8–19 March 1945 (WD GO 65, 1946)
- 34th Field Artillery Battalion, for 21–23 February 1943 (WD GO 51, 1946)
- 1st Battalion, 39th Infantry Regiment, for 18 June 1944 (WD GO 10, 1945)
- 2nd Battalion, 39th Infantry Regiment, for 11–12 July 1944 (WD GO 24, 1945)
- 1st Battalion, 39th Infantry Regiment, for 6–9 August 1944 (WD GO 10, 1945)
- 2nd Battalion, 47th Infantry Regiment, for 21–26 June 1944 (WD GO 86, 1944)
- 1st Battalion, 47th Infantry Regiment
- 47th Infantry Regiment, for 8–19 March 1945 (WD GO 65, 1946)
- 2nd Battalion, 47th Infantry Regiment, for 2–5 April 1945 (WD GO 98, 1945)
- 3rd Battalion, 47th Infantry Regiment, for 14–22 September 1944 (WD GO 139, 1946)
- 3rd Battalion, 47th Infantry Regiment, for 24–28 November 1944 (DA GO 25, 1948)
- 60th Field Artillery Battalion, for 21–23 February 1943 (WD GO 84, 1947)
- 2nd Battalion, 60th Infantry Regiment, for 23–24 April 1943 (WD GO 1, 1944)
- 2nd Battalion, 60th Infantry Regiment, for 16 June 1944 (WD GO 90, 1944)
- Cannon Company, 60th Infantry Regiment, for 21–23 February 1943 (WD GO 84, 1947)
- Medical Detachment, 3rd Battalion, 60th Infantry Regiment, for 6 September 1944 (WD GO 12, 1945)
- Company B, 60th Infantry Regiment, for 12 December 1944 (WD GO 55, 1945)
- 2nd Battalion, 60th Infantry Regiment, for 9–10 February 1945 (WD GO 68, 1945)
- 60th Field Artillery Battalion, for 21–23 February 1943 (WD GO 84, 1947)
- 84th Field Artillery Battalion (WD GO 51, 1946)
- 84th Field Artillery Battalion (WD GO 65, 1946)

===== Prisoners of war =====
- Total: 130,000

=== Cold War ===
- Inactivated: 15 January 1947
- Reactivated: 15 July 1947 at Fort Dix, New Jersey
- Reflagged: 1954 as 69th Infantry Division at Fort Dix, New Jersey
- 1954 - 28th Infantry Division reflagged as 9th Infantry Division in Germany and 28th Infantry returned to National Guard.
- Inactivated: 31 January 1962 at Fort Carson, Colorado
- Redesignated 1 February 1966 as Headquarters and Headquarters Company, 9th Infantry Division, and activated at Fort Riley, Kansas
- Inactivated 25 September 1969 in Hawaii
- Activated: 21 April 1972 at Fort Lewis, Washington
- Inactivated: 15 December 1991 at Fort Lewis, Washington

The 9th Infantry Division was reactivated on 15 July 1947 at Fort Dix, New Jersey and assumed a peacetime readiness and training role. In the 1950s, the division was stationed in West Germany. It later relocated to Fort Carson, Colorado where it was inactivated on 31 January 1962.

=== Vietnam War ===
The 9th Division was reactivated on 1 February 1966, and arrived in South Vietnam on 16 December 1966 from Fort Riley, Kansas. On deployment the division was assigned to the III Corps Tactical Zone of Vietnam where it commenced operations in Dinh Tuong and Long An Provinces (6 January-31 May 1967) in Operation Palm Beach. Its area of operations was in the rivers and canals of the Mekong Delta from 1967 to 1972. Operating deep within the Viet Cong (VC)–controlled Delta, the Division was charged with protecting the area and its population against VC insurgents and ensuring the success of the South Vietnamese government's pacification program. Faced with unrelenting physical hardships, a tenacious enemy and the region's rugged terrain, the Division established strategies and quantifiable goals for completing their mission.

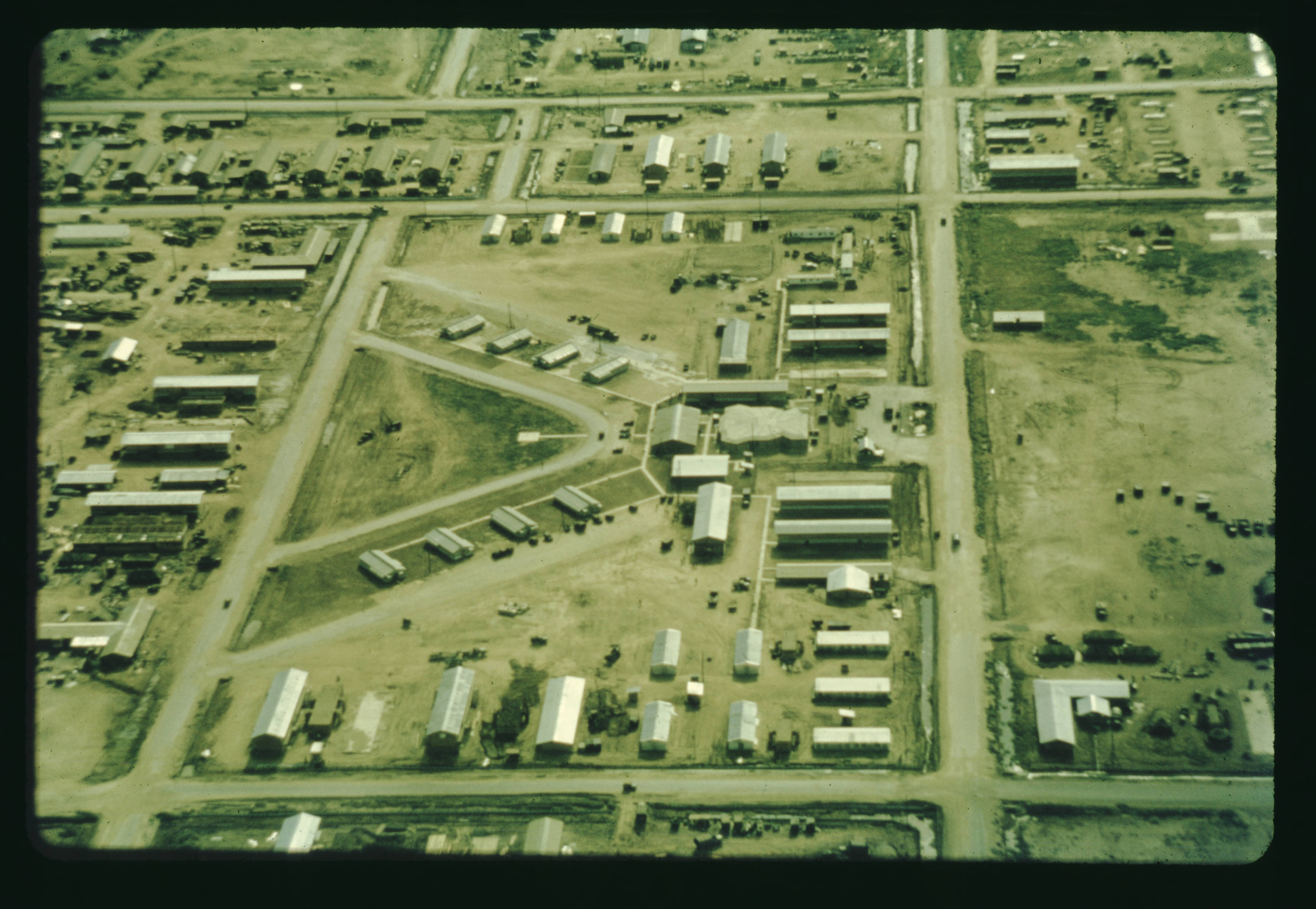
Division headquarters, Dong Tam Base Camp, July 1968

The infantry units that served with the 9th Infantry Division were:

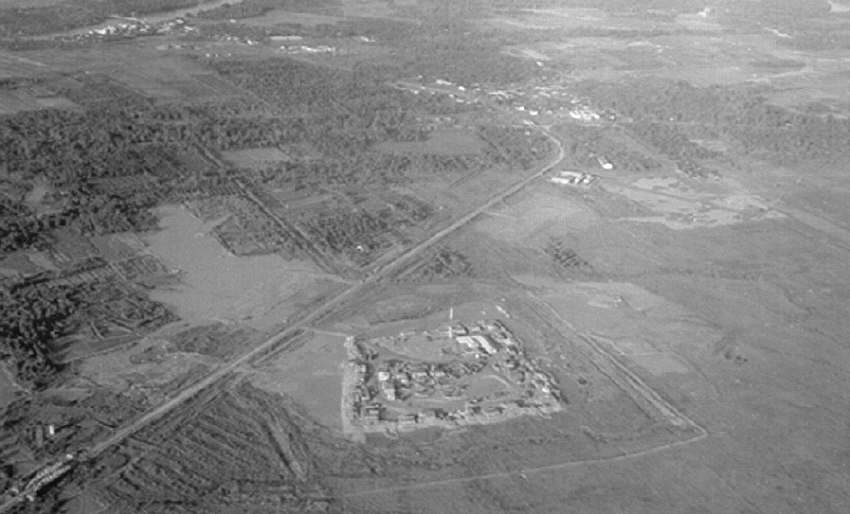
Fire Support Base Danger, HHC, 4th Battalion, 39th Infantry, Dinh Tuong Province, March 1969

- 2d Battalion, 39th Infantry
- 3d Battalion, 39th Infantry
- 4th Battalion, 39th Infantry
- 2d Battalion, 47th Infantry (Mechanized)
- 3d Battalion, 47th Infantry (Riverine)
- 4th Battalion, 47th Infantry (Riverine)
- 2d Battalion, 60th Infantry
- 3d Battalion, 60th Infantry (Riverine)
- 5th Battalion, 60th Infantry (Mechanized Dec. 1966 – 12 September 1968; Infantry 13 September 1968 – October 1970)
- 6th Battalion, 31st Infantry

Other units included:

- Company E, 50th Infantry (reflagged Co. E, 75th Inf (Ranger)), 2 December 1967 – Aug 1969
- Company E, 75th Infantry, Oct 1969 – Oct 1970
- 3d Squadron, 5th Cavalry, Feb 1967 – Nov 1971
- 9th Aviation Battalion, Jan 1967 – Aug 1969
- 2d Battalion, 4th Artillery (105mm Howitzer), Jan 1967 – Oct 1970
- 1st Battalion, 11th Artillery (105mm Howitzer), Jan 1967 – Aug 1969
- 3d Battalion, 34th Artillery (105mm Howitzer)(Riverine), Dec 1966 – Jul 1969 (Riverine)
- 1st Battalion, 84th Artillery (155mm Howitzer/8-inch Howitzer), Feb 1967 – Aug 1969
- 15th Engineer Battalion, Oct 1966 – Aug 1969
- 571st Engineer Company, Oct 1969 – Oct 1970
- 9th Medical Battalion, 4 January 1967 – 18 August 1969
- 9th Signal Battalion, 19 December 1966 – 19 August 1969
- 9th Supply and Transport Battalion, 16 December 1966 – 23 August 1969
- 709th Maintenance Battalion, 26 January 1967 – 20 August 1969
- 9th Adjutant General Company, 30 December 1966 – 26 August 1969
- 9th Military Police Company, 19 December 1966 – 25 September 1969
- 335th Army Security Agency Company (a.k.a. "335th Radio Research Unit"), 12 January 1967 – 5 April 1971
- 99th Support Battalion, 1 October 1969 – 12 October 1970
- 493 Military Intelligence Detachment, 3/9th Inf Div, 19 December 1966 - 20 August 1970

One of the experimental units serving with the division was the 39th Cavalry Platoon (Air Cushion Vehicle) which used three of the specially designed hovercraft to patrol marshy terrain like the Plain of Reeds along the south Vietnamese/Cambodian border. Other experimental units were the 1st and 2nd Airboat Platoons, which operated Hurricane Aircat airboats.

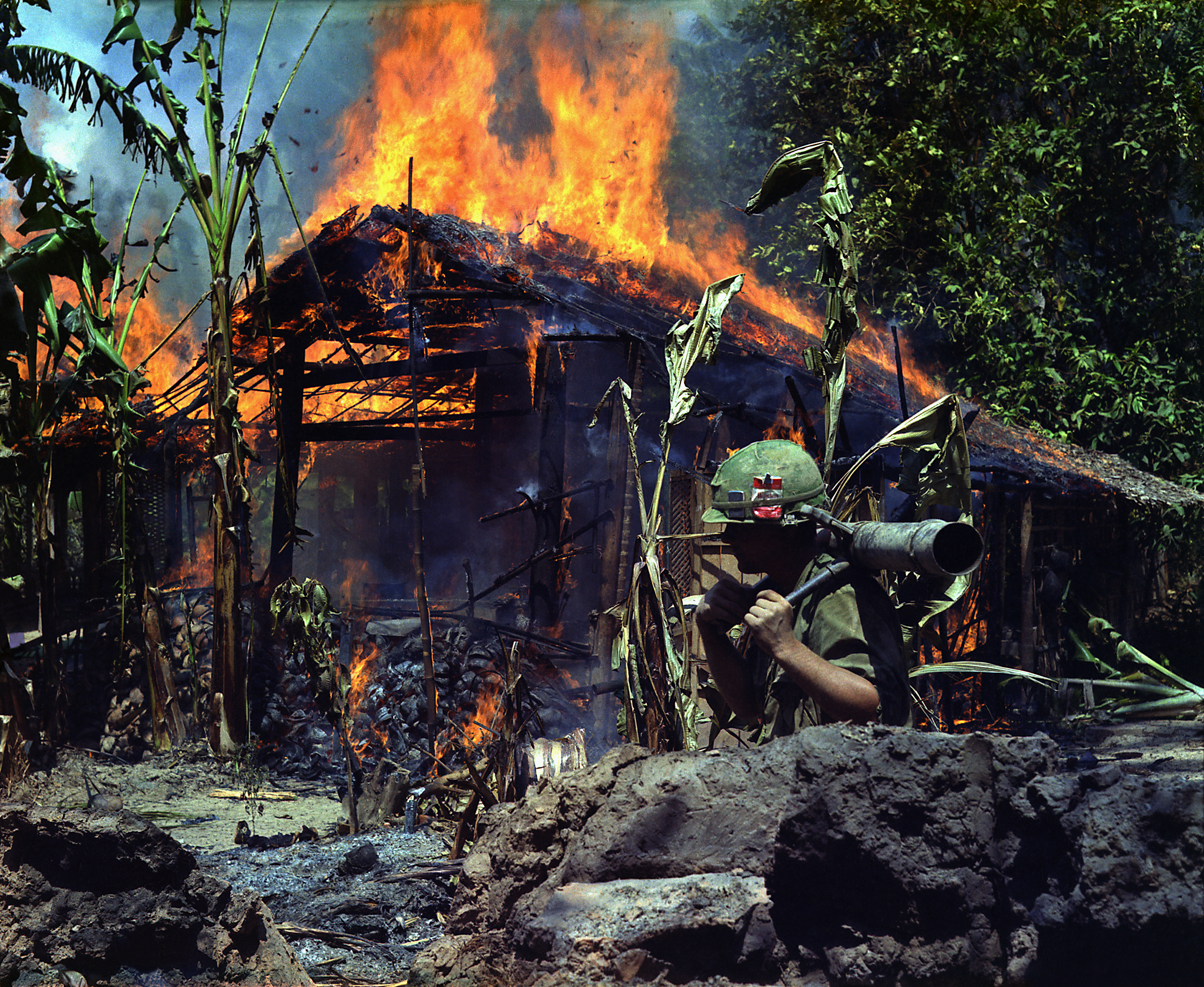
Mỹ Tho, Vietnam. A Viet Cong base camp being burned down.

From 1967 on, the 2d Brigade of the division was the Army contingent of the Mobile Riverine Force (MRF). This brigade lived on the ships of Navy Task Force 117, and were transported on their infantry missions throughout the Mekong Delta on Tango boats (converted landing craft) supported by various other armored boats. The MRF was often anchored near the South Vietnamese city of Mỹ Tho, or near the Division's Đồng Tâm Base Camp and they conducted operations in coordination with the Navy SEAL teams, the South Vietnamese Marines, units of the ARVN 7th Division and River Assault Groups. Following the Tet Offensive in 1968, General Westmoreland stated that the Division and the MRF saved the Delta region from falling to the People's Army of Vietnam forces. In 1969, the division also operated throughout IV Corps.

Chuck Hagel, later Secretary of Defense, served in the 9th ID from 1967 to 1968 as a sergeant (E-5), serving as an infantry squad leader. Hagel served in the same infantry squad as his younger brother Tom; they are believed to be the only American siblings to serve together during the Vietnam War.

The Division's major units departed from South Vietnam on 27 August 1969 (HHC & 1st Brigade) to Hawaii; 27 August 1969 (2nd Brigade) to Fort Lewis, Washington; 12 October 1970 (3rd Brigade) to Fort Lewis.

=== At Fort Lewis, 1972-1991 ===
==== Infantry Division ====
Following the Vietnam War the division was stationed at Fort Lewis. The formal activation ceremony was held on 26 May 1972. Initially the division was organized under the army's Reorganization Objective Army Division system.

Parts of the division between 1972 - 1983 were organized as follows:

  - 9th Cavalry Brigade (Air Attack) (activated 18 December 1980)
    - 3rd Squadron, 5th Cavalry
    - 9th Aviation Battalion (activated 21 April 1972)
    - 268th Attack Helicopter Battalion (activated 1 September 1981)
    - Company A, 214th Aviation Battalion (activated 1 July 1981)
  - Division Artillery (activated 21 June 1972)
    - 2nd Battalion, 4th Field Artillery (activated 21 October 1972)
    - 1st Battalion, 11th Field Artillery (activated 21 July 1972)
    - 3rd Battalion, 34th Field Artillery (activated 21 October 1972)
    - 1st Battalion, 84th Field Artillery (activated 21 October 1972)
    - Battery E, 333rd Field Artillery (activated 21 November 1977)
  - Division Support Command
    - Division Material Management Center
    - 9th Medical Battalion
    - 9th Supply & Transportation Battalion
    - 709th Maintenance Battalion
    - 9th Adjutant General Company
    - 9th Finance Company
    - 9th Division Band
    - 100th Ordnance Detachment
  - 1st Battalion, 67th Air Defense Artillery (activated 13 September 1972 - 1 April 1979)
  - 1st Battalion, 4th Air Defense Artillery (activated 1 April 1979)
  - 9th Signal Battalion (activated 21 June 1972)
  - 15th Engineer Battalion (activated 21 June 1972)
  - 109th Military Intelligence Battalion (activated 1 October 1981)
    - Company A (former 335th Army Security Agency Company (activated 21 December 1977 - reorganized 1 October 1981)
    - Company B (former 9th Military Intelligence Company (activated 21 December 1972 - reorganized 1 October 1981)
  - 9th Chemical Company (activated 1 September 1981)
  - 9th Military Police Company

==== Motorized division ====
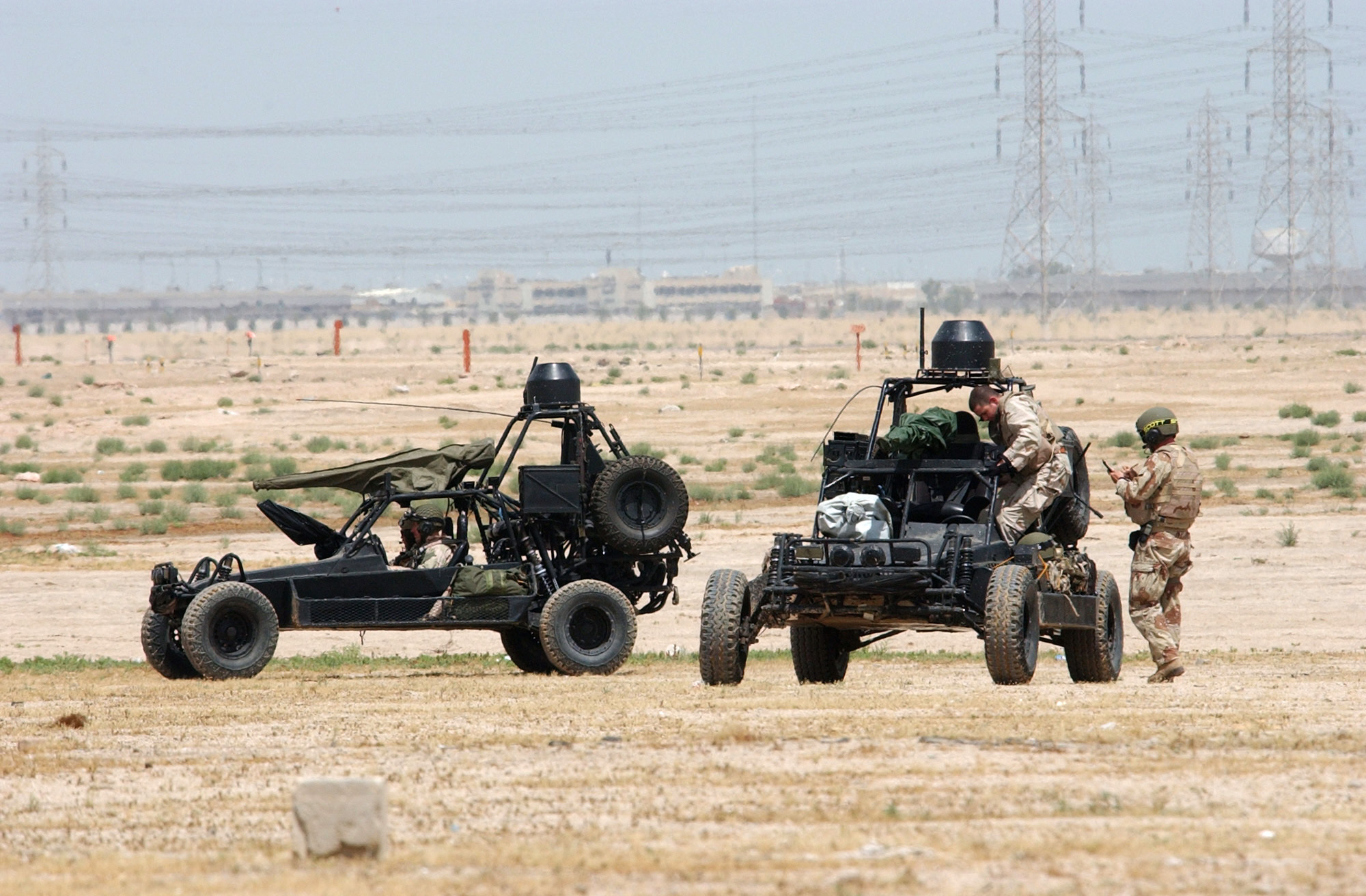
U.S. Navy SEALs operate Desert Patrol Vehicles (DPV), the successor to the Fast Attack Vehicle pioneered by the 9th ID (Motorized).

In 1980, the United States "recognized the military's inability to project forces swiftly to trouble-spots in the world with the capability of defeating armored forces of the Soviet Union or its surrogates." This inability was especially highlighted for the SE Asia and Middle East areas. In response, the army set about creating a new formation that would be set apart from the pending "Infantry Division 86" design. The formation would need to be highly mobile on a tactical and strategic level. From 1983, the division served as the High-Technology Test-Bed (HTTB) for the army to pursue this concept. The division was given the leeway to experiment, design, and finalize the design of the needed formation. Initially described as a high technology light Division, the term eventually settled upon and to highlight the highly mobile nature was motorized division. The motorized infantry division was to be equipped with enhanced technology to give it deployability and fire power and fill the gap between light and heavy divisions. The idea was to create a lighter version of the armored and mechanized divisions, which could be deployed easily by aircraft, while providing more firepower than a light infantry division.

Initially the vision was to create three motorized brigades with three new types of infantry battalion:

- Light Attack Battalion
- Combined Arms Battalion Light
- Combined Arms Battalion Heavy

The light attack battalions utilized the Fast Attack Vehicles (FAV - later re-designated the Desert Patrol Vehicle), essentially a Volkswagen-engined dune buggy with either a 40 mm Mk 19 grenade launcher or 12.7 mm M2 Browning machine gun. The FAV was designed to provide highly mobile firepower that could attack the flanks of heavier mechanized units. Some variants also mounted TOW missiles. All of these weapons systems were attached to the FAV by a mount designed to break away if the vehicle rolled over, which they were prone to do. The FAVs were problematic at best and were eventually replaced by various versions of the Humvee/HMMWV light truck.

The combined arms battalions were organized as a mix of assault gun companies and light motorized infantry companies, with the heavy battalions fielding two assault gun companies and one light motorized infantry company, while the ratio was reversed in the light battalions. The assault gun companies were to be equipped with the Armored Gun System (AGS), but because of delays in the AGS program they were initially equipped with M901 ITVs Improved Tow Vehicles, then M551 Sheridan light tanks and later with Humvees with TOW missiles or Mk 19 grenade launchers. Light motorized infantry companies were equipped with Humvees mounting a Mk 19 grenade launcher. Each combined arms battalion also fielded a combat support company equipped with mortars, scouts, and an anti-armor platoon slated to be equipped with Humvees mounting a ground version of the Hellfire missile. As this Hellfire version never entered service, the platoons were later also equipped with Humvees with TOW missiles.

The division's first and third brigade were to field one of each of the three new battalions, while the second brigade would field three combined arms battalions heavy. The third brigade was to field one light and one heavy combined arms battalion and the 9th Cavalry Brigade two attack helicopter battalions, one combat support aviation battalion, and one cavalry reconnaissance squadron. The division artillery would consist of three battalions equipped with M198 155 mm towed howitzers, one light artillery rocket battalion with M102 105 mm towed howitzers and M270 Multiple Launch Rocket Systems, and one target acquisition battery. The division support command would field three forward support, one cavalry support and one main support battalion. However, because of the delay of the Armored Gun System the division did only activate four of the envisioned five combined arms battalions heavy and retained the 2nd Battalion, 77th Armor instead.

Parts of the division were organized at the end of the 1980s as follows:

  - 9th Cavalry Brigade (Air Attack)
    - 3rd Squadron, 5th Cavalry
    - 9th Aviation Battalion (activated 1972)
    - 268th Attack Helicopter Battalion (activated 1981)
    - Company A, 214th Aviation Battalion
  - Division Artillery
    - 2nd Battalion, 4th Field Artillery
    - 1st Battalion, 11th Field Artillery
    - 3rd Battalion, 34th Field Artillery
    - 1st Battalion, 84th Field Artillery
    - Battery E, 333rd Field Artillery
  - Division Support Command
    - 1st Support Battalion (Forward)
    - 2nd Support Battalion (Forward)
    - 3rd Support Battalion (Forward)
    - 4th Support Battalion (Aviation)
    - 5th Support Battalion (Main)
  - 1st Battalion, 44th Air Defense Artillery
  - 9th Signal Battalion
  - 15th Engineer Battalion
  - 109th Military Intelligence Battalion
  - 9th Chemical Company
  - 9th Military Police Company
  - 9th Division Band

In case of war with Warsaw Pact forces the division would have reinforced the Allied Forces Baltic Approaches Command defending Denmark. By 1984 the 9th Cavalry Brigade (Air Attack) was testing motorcycles for reconnaissance work in its reconnaissance squadron, the 3rd Squadron, 5th Cavalry Regiment. And the 9th Infantry Division (MTZ) tested motorized infantry doctrine at the Yakima Firing Center in Eastern Washington, at the National Training Center at Fort Irwin California and in Korea during the annual Team Spirit exercise. While the motorized units performed well, they were vulnerable to heavier mechanized forces, particularly if forced to stand and fight. They were also extremely vulnerable to indirect artillery fire.

On 1 April 1984, Echo Company of the 15th Engineer Battalion reorganized to form the 73rd Engineer Company (Assault Ribbon Bridge), which was assigned to I Corps, which in turn attached it as separate company to the 15th Engineer Battalion. With the switch from Combat Arms Regimental System to the United States Army Regimental System the division saw a few of its units reflagged or inactivated:

- 15 September 1986: Company A, 214th Aviation Battalion inactivated
- 2 October 1986: 2nd Battalion, 4th Field Artillery to 3rd Battalion, 11th Field Artillery
- 2 October 1986: 3rd Battalion, 34th Field Artillery to 6th Battalion, 11th Field Artillery
- 16 March 1987: 3rd Squadron, 5th Cavalry to 1st Squadron, 9th Cavalry
- 16 April 1987: 2nd Battalion, 77th Armor to 1st Battalion, 33rd Armor
- 1987: 9th Aviation Battalion to 1st Battalion, 9th Aviation
- 1987: 268th Attack Helicopter Battalion to 2nd Battalion, 9th Aviation
- 16 March 1988: 1st Battalion, 67th Air Defense Artillery to 1st Battalion, 44th Air Defense Artillery
- unknown date:
  - 1st Support Battalion (Forward) to 99th Support Battalion
  - 2nd Support Battalion (Forward) to 109th Support Battalion
  - 3rd Support Battalion (Forward) to 209th Support Battalion
  - 4th Support Battalion (Aviation) to 3rd Battalion, 9th Aviation
  - 5th Support Battalion (Main) to 709th Support Battalion (Main)

During fiscal year 1987 the army decided to inactivate the division's 2nd brigade, which would be replaced by the 81st Infantry Brigade (Mechanized) of the Washington Army National Guard. The 2nd brigade was inactivated on 15 August 1988 along with the following units:

- 2nd Combined Arms Battalion Heavy, 47th Infantry
- 3rd Combined Arms Battalion Heavy, 60th Infantry
- 6th Battalion, 11th Field Artillery (inactivated 15 September 1988)
- 209th Support Battalion

On the same date the 1st Battalion, 33rd Armor, which until then had been attached to the division, was assigned to the division. With the inactivation of the 2nd brigade the remaining units were reassigned among the remaining brigades: 1st brigade now consisted of 2nd Combined Arms Battalion Heavy, 2nd Infantry, 1st Battalion, 33rd Armor, and 4th Combined Arms Battalion Light, 23rd Infantry. 3rd brigade consisted of 2nd Light Attack Battalion, 1st Infantry, 3rd Combined Arms Battalion Light, 47th Infantry, and 2nd Combined Arms Battalion Heavy, 60th Infantry. The 2nd Combined Arms Battalion Heavy, 23rd Infantry was assigned to the 9th Cavalry Brigade.

==== Organization in 1988 ====
McGrath writes that the 9th Infantry Division was organized as follows in 1988:

- 9th Infantry Division (Motorized), Fort Lewis, WA
  - Headquarters & Headquarters Company
  - 1st Brigade
    - Headquarters & Headquarters Company
    - 1st Battalion, 33rd Armor
    - 2nd Combined Arms Battalion Heavy, 2nd Infantry
    - 4th Combined Arms Battalion Light, 23rd Infantry
  - 3rd Brigade
    - Headquarters & Headquarters Company
    - 2nd Light Attack Battalion, 1st Infantry
    - 3rd Combined Arms Battalion Light, 47th Infantry
    - 2nd Combined Arms Battalion Heavy, 60th Infantry
  - 81st Infantry Brigade (Mechanized), (Washington Army National Guard), Seattle, WA
    - Headquarters & Headquarters Company
    - 1st Battalion, 303rd Armor
    - 1st Battalion, 803rd Armor
    - 1st Battalion, 161st Infantry (Mechanized)
    - 3rd Battalion, 161st Infantry (Mechanized)
    - 2nd Battalion, 146th Field Artillery (M109 155 mm self-propelled howitzers)
    - 181st Support Battalion
    - Troop E, 303rd Cavalry
    - 898th Engineer Company
    - Battery D, 216th Air Defense Artillery (Minnesota Army National Guard) - did not exist after 1993
  - 9th Cavalry Brigade (Air Combat)
    - Headquarters & Headquarters Troop
    - 1st Squadron, 9th Cavalry (8 × AH-1F Cobra, 12 × OH-58C Kiowa, 2 × UH-60A Black Hawk)
    - 2nd Battalion, 9th Aviation (30 × UH-60A Black Hawk & 16 × CH-47D Chinook)
    - 1st Battalion, 9th Aviation (21 × AH-1F Cobra & 13 × OH-58C Kiowa, a second attack helicopter battalion was scheduled to be activated)
    - 2nd Combined Arms Battalion Heavy, 47th Infantry
  - Division Artillery
    - Headquarters & Headquarters Battery
    - 1st Battalion, 11th Field Artillery (18 × M198 155 mm towed howitzers)
    - 3rd Battalion, 11th Field Artillery (18 × M198 155mm towed howitzer)
    - 1st Battalion, 84th Field Artillery (12 × M102 105 mm towed howitzer & 9 × M270 Multiple Launch Rocket Systems)
    - Battery E, 333rd Field Artillery (Target Acquisition, AN/TPQ-36 Firefinder & AN/TPQ-37 Firefinder radars)
  - Division Support Command
    - 3rd Battalion, 9th Aviation
    - 99th Support Battalion (Forward) (supports 3rd Brigade)
    - 109th Support Battalion (Forward) (supports 1st Brigade)
    - 709th Support Battalion (Main)
  - 1st Battalion, 44th Air Defense Artillery
  - 15th Engineer Battalion
  - 9th Signal Battalion
  - 109th Military Intelligence Battalion
  - 9th Chemical Company
  - 9th Military Police Company
  - 73rd Engineer Company (Assault Ribbon Bridge)
  - 9th Division Band

In fiscal year 1989 Chief of Staff of the United States Army General Carl E. Vuono approved the conversion of the division's two combined arms battalions light to standard mechanized infantry battalions.

=== Inactivation ===
The division was the first to undergo full inactivation following the end of the Cold War. Army leadership at first decided that inactivating units would turn in all of their equipment at "10/20" standard, i.e. in ready and reusable condition. The division struggled to meet this standard, which required both extensive work by the division's soldiers and high costs for repair parts. While the remaining 9th ID soldiers were ultimately successful, later inactivating units were not required to attain this goal.

The inactivation of the division began on 28 September 1990 with the inactivation of the 1st Brigade, 2nd Battalion, 23rd Infantry, and 4th Battalion, 23rd Infantry. The 1st Battalion, 84th Field Artillery inactivated on 15 January 1991. As inactivation proceeded, elements and individual soldiers from the division were detached and deployed for service in the Gulf War.

On 16 February 1991 the 3rd Brigade was reflagged as 199th Infantry Brigade (Motorized) with the following units:

- 199th Infantry Brigade (Motorized), Fort Lewis
  - Headquarters & Headquarters Company
  - 1st Battalion, 33rd Armor
  - 2nd Battalion, 1st Infantry
  - 3rd Battalion, 47th Infantry
  - 1st Battalion, 11th Field Artillery
  - 99th Support Battalion (Forward)
  - Troop A, 9th Cavalry (B troop 1/9 cavalry reflagged to A troop 1/9 cavalry rest of 1st Squadron, 9th Cavalry disbanded on the same date)
  - 102nd Engineer Company (Company D, 15th Engineer Battalion)
  - 9th Chemical Company
  - Battery E, 44th Air Defense Artillery (rest of 1st Battalion, 44th Air Defense Artillery disbanded on the same date)
  - 109th Military intelligence Company

The remainder of the division's units inactivated on the following dates:

- 15 February 1991: 2nd Battalion, 60th Infantry
- 15 April 1991: 15th Engineer Battalion
- 15 May 1991: 2nd Battalion, 2nd Infantry
- 15 July 1991: 9th Signal Battalion and Battery E, 333rd Field Artillery
- 15 September 1991: 109th Military Intelligence Battalion

With the support and aviation units also inactivating. The divisional headquarters remained active until 15 December 1991.

The "3rd Battalion, 9th Aviation Regiment (an aviation maintenance battalion) began to centrally schedule and process the turn-in of organizational property for inactivating units under the supervision of a shrinking division staff. On 21 June 1991, the 9th Infantry Division (Motorized) formally inactivated. The remaining few units continued to be reduced and inactivated through the 3/9th Aviation until this unit finally inactivated itself on 17 December 1991."

The 3rd Battalion, 11th Field Artillery became a General Support battalion of I Corps Artillery.

The division was identified as the second-highest priority inactive division in the United States Army Center of Military History's lineage scheme due to its numerous accolades and long history. All of the division's flags and heraldic items were moved to the National Infantry Museum at Fort Benning, Georgia following its inactivation. Should the U.S. Army decide to activate more divisions in the future, the center stated its activation recommendations would be the 9th Infantry Division, then the 24th Infantry Division, the 5th Infantry Division, and the 2nd Armored Division. The 7th Infantry Division, previously inactivated, resumed service as an administrative headquarters at Joint Base Lewis–McChord in 2012.

== Honors ==
=== Campaign participation credit ===
- World War II:
1. Normandy;
2. Northern France;
3. Rhineland;
4. Ardennes-Alsace;
5. Central Europe
- Vietnam:
1. Counteroffensive, Phase II
2. Counteroffensive, Phase III
3. Tet Counteroffensive
4. Counteroffensive, Phase IV
5. Counteroffensive, Phase V
6. Counteroffensive, Phase VI
7. Tet 69/Counteroffensive
8. Summer-Fall 1969

=== Decorations ===
1. Presidential Unit Citation (Army) for DINH TUONG PROVINCE (1st Brigade Only) (Headquarters and Headquarters Company, 1st Brigade, 9th Infantry Division, cited; DA GO 60, 1969)
2. Presidential Unit Citation (Army) for DAK TO DISTRICT (2nd Brigade Only) (Headquarters and Headquarters Company, 2nd Brigade, 9th Infantry Division, cited; DA GO 45, 1969)
3. Valorous Unit Award for BEN TRE CITY (3rd Brigade Only) (Headquarters and Headquarters Company, 3rd Brigade, 9th Infantry Division, cited; DA GO 42, 1969)
4. Valorous Unit Award for SAIGON (3rd Brigade Only) (Headquarters and Headquarters Company, 3rd Brigade, 9th Infantry Division, cited; DA GO 43, 1970)
5. Belgian Fourragere 1940 (Headquarters, 9th Infantry Division, cited; DA GO 43, 1950)
6. Cited in the Order of the Day of the Belgian Army for action at the Meuse River (Headquarters, 9th Infantry Division, cited; DA GO 43, 1950)
7. Cited in the Order of the Day of the Belgian Army for action in the Ardennes (Headquarters, 9th Infantry Division, cited; DA GO 43, 1950)
8. Republic of Vietnam Cross of Gallantry with Palm, Streamer embroidered VIETNAM 1966-1968 (Headquarters and Headquarters Company, 9th Infantry Division, cited; DA GO 31, 1969)
9. Republic of Vietnam Cross of Gallantry with Palm, Streamer embroidered VIETNAM 1969 (Headquarters and Headquarters Company, 9th Infantry Division, cited; DA GO 59, 1969)
10. Republic of Vietnam Civil Action Honor Medal, First Class, Streamer embroidered VIETNAM 1966-1969 (Headquarters and Headquarters Company, 9th Infantry Division, cited; DA GO 59, 1969)

== Insignia ==
The shoulder sleeve insignia is an octofoil resembling a heraldic design given to the ninth son of a family. This represents the son as a circle in the middle with eight brothers around him. The blue represents the infantry, the red the artillery, with the white completing the colors of the flag of the United States of America.

== Commanders ==
Commanders of the 9th Infantry Division included:

- COL Charles Carr Clark, Jul – Sep 1918
- MG Willard Ames Holbrook, Sep – Oct 1918
- BG James A. Ryan, Oct – Nov 1918
- MG Willard Ames Holbrook, Nov 1918 – Feb 1919

*Division inactive, Feb 1919 – Aug 1940

- COL Charles B. Elliott, Aug – Sep 1940
- BG Francis W. Honeycutt, Sep – Oct 1940
- MG Jacob L. Devers, Oct 1940 – Aug 1941
- MG Rene E. Hoyle, Aug 1941 – Aug 1942
- MG Manton S. Eddy, Aug 1942 – Aug 1944
- MG Louis A. Craig, Aug 1944 – May 1945
- BG Jesse A. Ladd, May 1945 – Mar 1946
- MG Horace L. McBride, Mar 1946 – Jan 1947
- MG William W. Eagles, Jul 1947 – Apr 1948
- MG A. Arnim White, Apr 1948 – Oct 1949
- MG John M. Devine, Oct 1949 – Sep 1950
- MG William Kelly Harrison Jr., Sep 1950 – Feb 1952
- MG Roderick R. Allen, Feb – Jun 1952
- MG Homer W. Kiefer, Jun 1952 – Jul 1953
- MG Cornelius E. Ryan, Jul 1953 – May 1954
- MG Donald Prentice Booth, May – Nov 1954
- MG Halley G. Maddox, Nov 1954 – Jun 1956
- MG Harry P. Storke, Jun 1956 – Sep 1957
- BG Joseph B. Crawford, Sep 1957 – Mar 1958
- MG Martin J. Morin, Mar 1958 – Apr 1959
- BG Richard A. Risden, Apr 1959 – Mar 1960
- COL Charles L. Heltman Jr., Mar – May 1960
- BG Ashton H. Manhart, May 1960 – Feb 1962

*Division inactive, Feb 1962 – Feb 1966

- MG George S. Eckhardt, Feb 1966 – Jun 1967
- MG George G. O'Connor, Jun 1967 – Feb 1968
- MG Julian J. Ewell, Feb 1968 – Apr 1969
- MG Harris W. Hollis, Apr 1969 – Aug 1969

*Division inactive, Sep 1969 – Apr 1972

- MG William B. Fulton, Apr 1972 – Feb 1974
- MG John Q. Henion, Mar 1974 – Aug 1975
- MG Volney F. Warner, Aug 1975 – Jun 1977
- MG Richard E. Cavazos, Jul 1977 – Jan 1980
- MG Howard F. Stone, Jan 1980 – Aug 1981
- MG Robert M. Elton, Aug 1981 – Jun 1983
- MG Robert W. RisCassi, Jun 1983 – May 1985
- MG Donald S. Pihl, May 1985 – April 1987
- MG John M. Shalikashvili, Apr 1987 – Aug 1989
- MG Charles H. Armstrong, Aug 1989 – Feb 1991
- BG Raymond T. Roe, Feb 1991 – Jun 1991

*Division inactive, June 1991 – present

== See also ==
- Lewis Army Museum

== Bibliography ==
- Clay, Lt. Col. Steven E. (2010a). US Army Order of Battle 1919-1941 Volume I. The Arms: Major Commands and Infantry Organizations. Command and General Staff College, Kansas: Combat Studies Institute Press. - Public Domain - United States Government
