= General Bartlett =

General Bartlett may refer to:

- George L. Bartlett (1924–2024), U.S. Marine Corps brigadier general
- George True Bartlett (1856–1949), U.S. Army major general
- Gerald T. Bartlett (born 1936), U.S. Army lieutenant general
- Joseph J. Bartlett (1834–1893), Union Army brigadier general
- William Francis Bartlett (1840–1876), Union Army brigadier general and brevet major general
