= Howard Stone =

Howard Stone may refer to:

- Howard A. Stone, American professor of engineering
- Howard F. Stone, U.S. Army general
