= Military Professional Resources Inc. =

Private US military company

L-3 MPRI was a provider of private military contractor services with customers that included the U.S. Department of Defense, U.S. Department of State, U.S. Department of Justice, U.S. Department of Homeland Security, law enforcement agencies, foreign governments, government agencies, and commercial businesses.

L-3 MPRI was based in Alexandria, Virginia. L-3 MPRI's President was retired US Army General Bantz J. Craddock. The CEO was Carl E. Vuono.

== History ==
L-3 MPRI, now known as Engility Corporation, was incorporated in 1987 by eight former senior military leaders, including Carl E. Vuono, a former Army Chief of Staff, who joined the company in 1993. General William F. Kernan of the U.S. Army also joined the firm after his military service.

In June 2000, L-3 MPRI became a division of L-3 Communications Corporation, which specializes in various areas, including Command, Control, and Communications; Intelligence, Surveillance and Reconnaissance (C3ISR); government services; training and simulation; aircraft modernization and maintenance; and electronic systems. L-3 is also a major provider of homeland defense products and services.

As part of a spin-off, L-3 MPRI became part of the newly independent company, ENGILITY Corporation.

== Training ==
MPRI began by almost exclusively employing retired U.S. military personnel.

It used retired military personnel and current U.S. National Guard or reservists to run Reserve Officer Training Corps programs at more than 200 universities. Other employees have worked in U.S. Army recruitment centers and trained U.S. soldiers. With offices in other countries, employees also have trained foreign armies at ranges in Bosnia and Herzegovina, Iraq, Kuwait, and South Africa. MPRI offered a range of services to its clients, drawing on expertise from various fields such as the military, law enforcement, analysis, disaster management, diplomacy, and the private sector.

A group of Serbs who lived in Krajina until Operation Storm sued MPRI for their participation in military activities, including militarily equipping the Croatian Armed Forces and training Croatian soldiers during the Croatian War of Independence. On September 26, 2014, the lawsuit was rejected by Judge John Lee because the war in former Yugoslavia is not under the jurisdiction of this court. Local forces in Croatia were referred to MPRI by the United States Department of Defense.

MPRI-trained security forces were used to defeat an attack on the presidential palace of Equatorial Guinea's long-serving dictator Teodoro Obiang Nguema.

== Defense contracts ==
In the early 1990s, MPRI signed a 5-year contract with the U.S. State Department involving the shipment of donated medical supplies and food to former Soviet states.

In 1998, the government of Equatorial Guinea asked MPRI to evaluate its defense systems, particularly its need for a coast guard to protect its oil reserves. To be eligible for the job, MPRI needed a license from the U.S. State Department. The Clinton administration rejected the request, citing the West African nation's human rights record. In 2000, after lobbying by MPRI, the State Department issued the license. MPRI did not reveal the terms of its contract with Equatorial Guinea.

MPRI was contracted to provide assistance to the Croatian and Bosnian defense forces during the Yugoslav Wars.

In 1999, MPRI signed an 18-month, $4.3 million contract to work with the military in Colombia on the drug war. The contract expired in March 2001 and was not renewed, allegedly because the Colombian Defense Ministry and its officers were upset by recommendations such as "Hit the enemy with a closed fist; do not poke at him with the fingers of an open hand." (Note: This is a maxim of World War II German General Heinz Guderian.)

According to a United States Department of Defense census, MPRI has at least 500 employees working in Iraq on 12 different contracts, including mentoring civilian workers at the Ministry of Defense.

MPRI, under a U.S. Department of Defense contract, conducted training and advisory services for the Afghan National Army (ANA). Also supported in various areas are logistical and advisory services in regional areas of Afghanistan.

MPRI is a contractor for the U.S. State Department's Bureau of African Affairs and provides training in African countries, including Uganda, with an emphasis on pre-deployment training of UPDF en route to support African Union initiatives in Somalia.
