= Architect of Victory =

"Architect of Victory" performed by the U.S. Army Band

"Architect of Victory" is a concert march composed by James L. Hosay in 1994 as a tribute to United States Army General Gordon Russell Sullivan for performance on the occasion of his retirement as Chief of Staff of the United States Army. At the time Hosay composed the march, he was a member of the United States Army Band.
