= Commandant of the United States Army Command and General Staff College =

Col. Dave Norris, Commandant, Command and General Staff College

The Commandant of the United States Army Command and General Staff College is the highest-ranking official at the United States Army's Fort Leavenworth, Kansas, installation. The position is similar to the West Point Superintendent and is roughly equivalent to the chancellor or president of an American civilian university. Since 1976, the commandant has been a Lieutenant General (three stars) and is also in charge of the United States Army Combined Arms Center which includes other training organizations at Fort Leavenworth.

The General Staff College, which is a graduate school, trains a high number of United States Army field officers, many of whom go on to become general officers. The college is part of the United States Army Training and Doctrine Command.

== List of commandants ==
The college has the following list of commandants. There were also breaks during the Spanish–American War and World War I.

School of Application for Cavalry and Infantry

- COL Elwell Stephen Otis November 1881 – June 1885
- COL Thomas H. Ruger June 1885 – May 1886

United States Infantry and Cavalry School

- COL Alexander McDowell McCook May 1886 – August 1890
- COL Edwin F. Townsend August 1890 – October 1894
- COL Hamilton S. Hawkins October 1894 – April 1898 (closed during Spanish–American War)

General Service and Staff College

- COL Charles W. Miner September 1902 – June 1903

United States Infantry and Cavalry School

- BG John Franklin Bell July 1903 – June 1906

Army School of the Line

- BG Charles Badger Hall August 1906 – April 1908
- MAJ John Frank Morrison (Acting) April – August 1908
- BG Frederick Funston August 1908 – January 1911
- BG Ramsay D. Potts January 1911 – February 1913
- LTC William P. Burnham (Acting) February 1913 – August 1914
- BG Henry Alexander Greene September 1914 – August 1916
- BG Eben Swift August 1916 – November 1916 (officer training closed during World War I although other training took place)
- LTC James W. McAndrew November 1916 – June 1917
- LTC Charles Miller June – July 1917
- COL William A. Shunk July 1917 – July 1919
- MG Charles Henry Muir July 1919 – August 1920
- COL Lucius Roy Holbrook August – September 1920
- BG Hugh Aloysius Drum September 1920 – July 1921
- BG Hanson Edward Ely August 1921 – June 1923
- BG Harry A. Smith July 1923 – June 1925

Command and General Staff School

- BG Edward Leonard King July 1925 – July 1929
- MG Stuart Heintzelman July 1929 – February 1935
- MG Herbert J. Brees February 1935 – June 1936
- BG Charles M. Bundel June 1936 – March 1939
- BG Lesley J. McNair April 1939 – July 1940
- BG Edmund L. Gruber October 1940 – May 1941
- BG Horace H. Fuller June – November 1941
- COL Converse R. Lewis (Acting) November 1941 – March 1942
- MG Karl Truesdell March 1942 – November 1945

Command and General Staff College

- LTG Leonard T. Gerow November 1945 – January 1948
- LTG Manton S. Eddy January 1948 – July 1950
- BG Harlan N. Hartness (Acting) July – October 1950
- MG Horace L. McBride October 1950 – March 1952
- MG Henry I. Hodes March 1952 – March 1954
- BG Charles E. Beauchamp (Acting) March – July 1954
- MG Garrison Holt Davidson July 1954 – July 1956
- MG Lionel C. McGarr July 1956 – August 1960
- MG Harold K. Johnson August 1960 – February 1963
- MG Harry J. Lemley Jr. February 1963 – August 1966
- MG Michael S. Davison August 1966 – September 1968
- MG John H. Hay September 1968 – January 1971
- MG John J. Hennessey January 1971 – August 1973
- MG John H. Cushman 1 Jul 1973 – February 1976
- MG Morris J. Brady (Acting) February – November 1976
- LTG John R. Thurman III November 1976 – 30 Sep 1979
- LTG William Reed Richardson 9 Oct 1979 – 23 Aug 1981
- LTG Howard F. Stone 24 Aug 1981 – 25 Jun 1982
- LTG Jack W. "Neil" Merritt 26 Jun 1982 – 6 Jun 1983
- LTG Carl E. Vuono 24 Jun 1983 – 9 Jun 1985
- LTG Robert W. RisCassi 10 Jun 1985 – 9 Jun 1986
- LTG Gerald T. Bartlett 10 Jun 1986 – 13 Jul 1988
- LTG Leonard P. Wishart III 14 Jul 1988 – 15 Aug 1991
- LTG Wilson Allen Shoffner 16 Aug 1991 – 27 Jul 1993
- LTG John E. Miller 27 Jul 1993 – 19 Jul 1995
- LTG Leonard D. Holder, Jr. 19 Jul 1995 – 7 Aug 1997
- LTG Montgomery C. Meigs 7 Aug 1997 – 22 Oct 1998
- LTG William M. Steele 23 Oct 1998 – 25 Jul 2001
- LTG James C. Riley 26 Jul 2001 – 25 Jun 2003
- LTG William Scott Wallace 13 Jul 2003 – 19 Oct 2005
- LTG David H. Petraeus 20 Oct 2005 – 2 Feb 2007
- LTG William B. Caldwell IV 11 Jun 2007 – November 2009
- LTG Robert L. Caslen March 2010 – July 2011
- LTG David G. Perkins November 2011 – February 2014
- LTG Robert B. Brown February 2014 – April 2016
- BG John S. Kem (interim) April 2016 – June 2016
- LTG Michael D. Lundy June 2016 – December 2019
- LTG James E. Rainey December 2019 – May 2021
- LTG Theodore D. Martin May 2021 – October 2022
- LTG Milford H. Beagle Jr. October 2022 – November 2025
- LTG James P. Isenhower III November 2025 to June 2026
- COL Dave A. Norris June 2026 to Present

== See also ==
- List of lists of people from Kansas
