= Wilson Allen Shoffner =

Wilson A. Shoffner
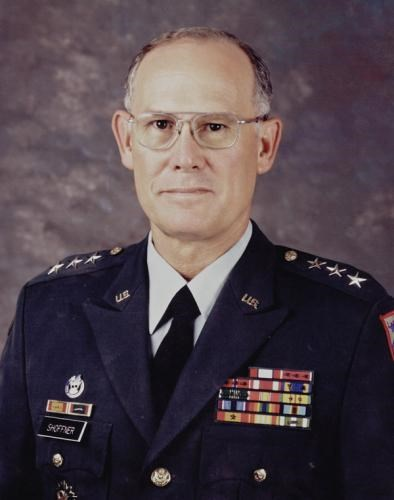
- Born: March 28, 1938; Ryan, Oklahoma, U.S.
- Died: January 3, 2014 (aged 75); Colleyville, Texas, U.S.
- Military career
- Allegiance: United States
- Branch: United States Army
- Service years: 1961–1993
- Rank: Lieutenant General
- Commands: Commandant of the United States Army Command and General Staff College; 3rd Infantry Division; 214th Field Artillery Brigade; 3rd Battalion, 79th Field Artillery Regiment
- Conflicts: Vietnam War

Wilson Allen "Dutch" Shoffner Sr. (March 28, 1938 – January 3, 2014) was a lieutenant general in the United States Army. He was Commandant of the United States Army Command and General Staff College from August 16, 1991 to July 27, 1993.

Shoffner was born and raised in Ryan, Oklahoma, graduating from Ryan High School. He attended Cameron College and then completed a B.S. degree in mechanical engineering at Oklahoma State University in 1961. Shoffner participated in the Army ROTC program and was commissioned as a second lieutenant of field artillery. He later earned an M.S. degree in international relations from George Washington University.

As a general officer, Shoffner served as assistant commander of the 1st Cavalry Division at Fort Hood and as commanding general of the 3rd Infantry Division in Würzburg, Germany.

Shoffner was married to Beverly Beth Beauchamp (May 8, 1938 – December 17, 2013) and they had two sons. Wilson Allen "Al" Shoffner Jr. is a 1988 graduate of the United States Military Academy who retired from active duty as a major general in 2020. Thomas Andrew "Andy" Shoffner is a 1990 graduate of the Military Academy who retired from active duty as a colonel in 2017.

Shoffner died at his home in Colleyville, Texas. He was interred along with his wife at Arlington National Cemetery on August 27, 2014.
