= Leonard P. Wishart III =

American military officer (born 1934)

Leonard Wishart
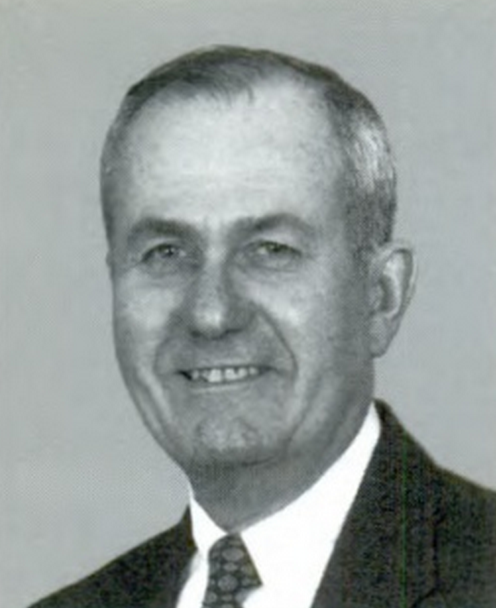
- Born: September 24, 1934 (age 92); Newark, New Jersey, U.S.
- Education: United States Military Academy (BS); University of Virginia (MS)
- Military career
- Allegiance: United States
- Branch: United States Army
- Service years: 1957–1991
- Rank: Lieutenant General
- Commands: Commandant of the Army Command and General Staff College; 1st Infantry Division; 1st Brigade, 24th Infantry Division; 2nd Battalion, 5th Cavalry Regiment
- Conflicts: Vietnam War
- Awards: Legion of Merit; Distinguished Flying Cross; Bronze Star Medal; Air Medal ("V" device)
- Other work: Director of Non-Legislative and Financial Services, House of Representatives

Leonard Plumer Wishart III (born September 24, 1934) is an American retired lieutenant general in the United States Army. After being commissioned from the United States Military Academy in 1957 as an infantry officer, he went on to serve two combat tours in the Vietnam War, where his awards included the Legion of Merit, the Distinguished Flying Cross, the Bronze Star Medal, and the Air Medal with valor. His later commands included the 1st Infantry Divison, from 1986 to 1988. Wishart's last post before his retirement for the military was as commandant of the United States Army Command and General Staff College from 1988 to 1991. Wishart later served as the first Director of Non-Legislative and Financial Services of the United States House of Representatives from 1992 to 1994.

== Early life, family, and education ==
Leonard Plumer Wishart III was born on September 24, 1934, in Newark, New Jersey. He graduated from the United States Military Academy at West Point, New York, in 1957, receiving a bachelor of science degree in engineering and a commission as a second lieutenant of infantry. He is married to Sandra F. (DeVito) Wishart, and they have two children. His later education includes a master of science degree in nuclear physics from the University of Virginia, which he obtained in 1966. Wishart also completed the United States Army Command and General Staff College in 1970 and the United States Army War College in 1974.

== Army career ==
Wishart served in the 325th Infantry Regiment and the 34th Infantry Regiment from 1958 to 1962, and then in the 24th Infantry Division from 1962 to 1963. After completing the United States Army Infantry School in 1964 and his studies at the University of Virginia in 1966, he was deployed for the Vietnam War. Wishart served as the S-3 officer of the 2nd Battalion, 5th Cavalry Regiment, while in South Vietnam from 1966 to 1967. His awards during that deployment included a Bronze Star Medal and eight Air Medals. After graduating from the Army Command and Staff College in 1970, he was deployed to Vietnam again, where he commanded the 2nd Battalion, 5th Cavalry, until 1971. His awards on his second tour included the Legion of Merit, the Distinguished Flying Cross, two Bronze Stars, and the Air Medal with valor. Wishart served as the Cadet Activities Officer for the Corps of Cadets at the US Military Academy from 1971 to 1973.

After completing the Army War College in 1974, he served on the Army Staff as Chief of the Strength Management Branch, Military Personnel Management Directorate, in the Office of the Deputy Chief of Staff for Personnel, until 1975. Wishart then served as the senior military assistant to the United States secretary of the Army until 1976. He was later an operations research analyst for the manpower and force programs analysis team in the Programs and Evaluation Directorate, Office of the Chief of Staff of the United States Army, until 1977. Wishart commanded the 1st Brigade, 24th Infantry Division, at Fort Stewart, Georgia, from 1977 to 1978; served as the division chief of staff from 1979 to 1979; and served as the chief of staff of VII Corps in West Germany from 1978 to 1981. He then served as the assistant division commander of the 1st Armored Division, United States Army Europe, from 1981 to 1983.

In 1983, Wishart became the deputy commanding general of the United States Army Combat Development Activity at Fort Leavenworth, Kansas. In 1986, he became the commanding general of the 1st Infantry Division at Fort Riley. He remained in that post until 1988. Wishart was then the commandant of the United States Army Command and General Staff College from July 14, 1988 to August 15, 1991. He retired from the Army in 1991.

== Later career ==
Wishart served as the Director of Non-Legislative and Financial Services of the United States House of Representatives from October 1992 to January 1994, during the 102nd and 103rd United States Congress (the position was a predecessor to the current Chief Administrative Officer of the United States House of Representatives). He later worked as a business consultant at Burdshaw Associates Limited in 1994.
