= Carl E. Vuono =

American retired general (born 1934)

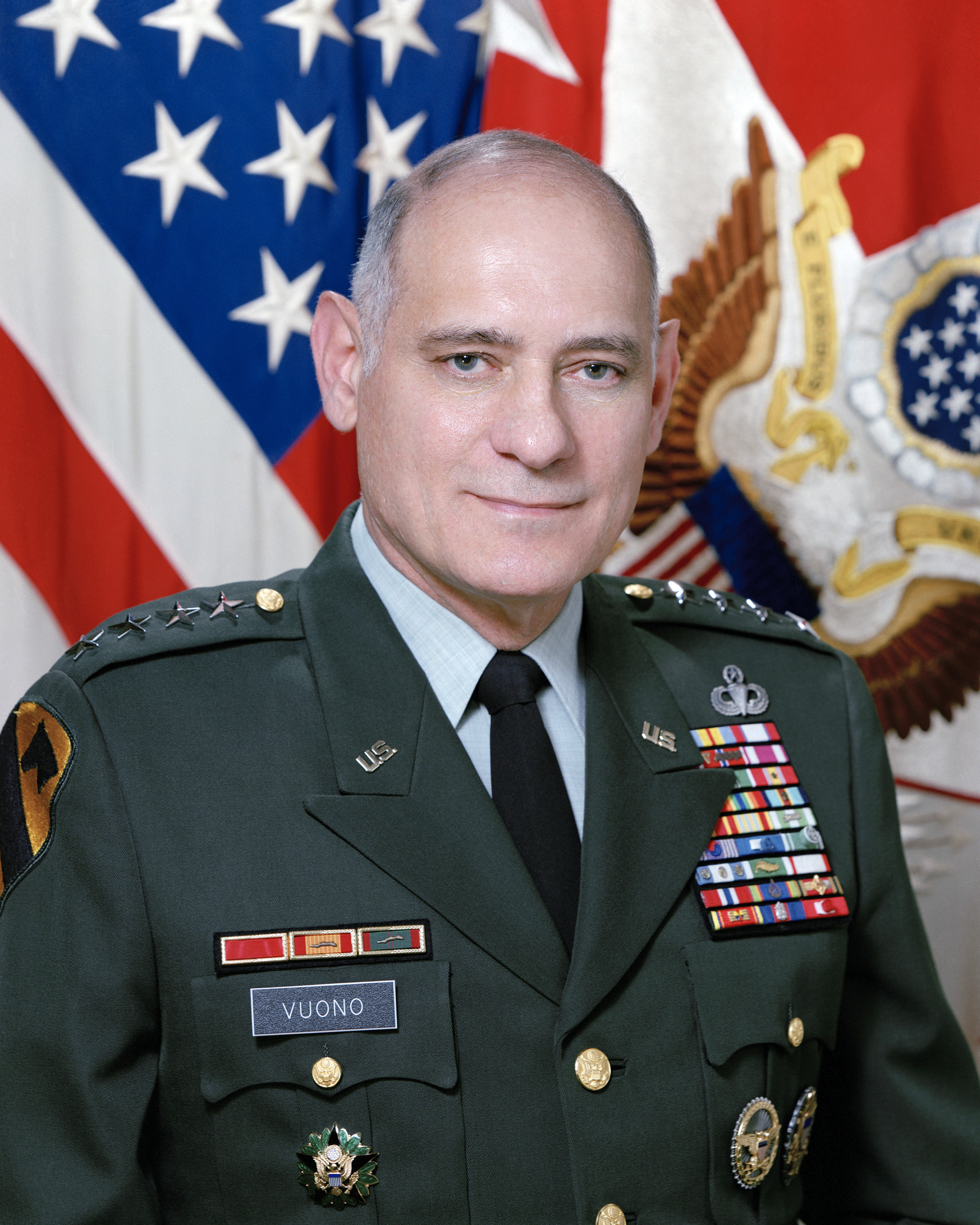
- Official portrait, 1991
- Born: 18 October 1934 (age 91); Monongahela, Pennsylvania, U.S.
- Education: United States Military Academy (BS); Shippensburg State College (MPA)
- Military career
- Allegiance: United States
- Branch: United States Army
- Service years: 1957–1991
- Rank: General
- Commands: Chief of Staff of the United States Army; United States Army Training and Doctrine Command; United States Army Command and General Staff College; 8th Infantry Division; 1st Battalion, 77th Field Artillery Regiment
- Conflicts: Vietnam War; Operation Just Cause; Gulf War
- Awards: Defense Distinguished Service Medal; Army Distinguished Service Medal (3); Navy Distinguished Service Medal; Air Force Distinguished Service Medal; Coast Guard Distinguished Service Medal; Legion of Merit; Bronze Star Medal with "V" Device (5)
- Other work: CEO, Military Professional Resources Inc.

Carl Edward Vuono (born 18 October 1934) is an American retired general who last served as the 31st chief of staff of the United States Army from 1987 to 1991. Born in Monongahela, Pennsylvania, he graduated from the United States Military Academy in 1957 as a Field Artillery Branch officer. He had two combat deployments during the Vietnam War in the 1960s and early 1970s, where he was awarded the Bronze Star Medal with valor. During his second tour, Vuono served as a battalion commander.

He went on to serve in many command and staff roles, which included leading the 82nd Airborne Division Artillery from 1975 to 1976, the 8th Infantry Division from 1981 to 1983, Fort Leavenworth and the Army Command and General Staff College from 1983 to 1985, and the Army Training and Doctrine Command from 1986 to 1987. Vuono also served as the deputy chief of staff for operations and plans of the United States Army from 1985 to 1986.

As the chief of staff of the Army from 1987, Vuono presided over the shift from the Cold War focus on the Soviet Union to other missions. He was involved in coordinating the effort during Operation Just Cause in Panama and the Gulf War against Iraq. He also authorized the creation of the Army Acquisition Corps. His awards included the Defense, Army, Navy, Air Force, and Coast Guard Distinguished Service Medals. After his retirement from the Army in 1991, Vuono became part of the private military company Military Professional Resources Inc., where he was the CEO from 1999 to 2000.

== Early life, family, and education ==
Carl Edward Vuono was born on 18 October 1934, in Monongahela, Pennsylvania. He was commissioned as an Army second lieutenant of the Field Artillery Branch upon graduating from the United States Military Academy, in West Point, New York, in 1957, with a Bachelor of Science degree in engineering. He married Patricia (Hall) Vuono in 1960, and they have three children. His military education included the Marine Corps Command and Staff College in 1968 and the Army War College in 1973. Vuono also obtained a Master of Public Administration degree from the Shippensburg State College.

== Army career ==
After being commissioned in 1957, Vuono served in the Howitzer Battery, 1st Reconnaissance Squadron, 3rd Armored Cavalry Regiment, from 1958 to 1960. He was made temporary first lieutenant in 1958, and that was made permanent in 1960. He then served in Korea as operations officer of the 5th Howitzer Battalion, 82nd Field Artillery Regiment, 1st Cavalry Division, from 1960 to 1961, before attending the Army Air Defense Artillery School and the Artillery and Missile School. He was made temporary captain in 1961. After graduating in 1962, Vuono served at the artillery headquarters of the XVIII Airborne Corps from 1962 to 1963. He took part in an exchange officer program that sent him to Aldershot, England, to serve with the 7th Royal Horse Artillery (Parachute), 16th Parachute Group, from 1964 to 1965. He became a permanent captain in 1964 and a temporary major in 1965.

In 1966, he was deployed for the Vietnam War as the executive officer of the 1st Battalion, 7th Field Artillery Regiment, 1st Infantry Division, until 1967. Vuono then attended the Marine Corps Command and Staff College, completing it in 1968. That year, he was promoted to temporary lieutenant colonel and became a personnel management officer in the Field Artillery Branch, Officer Personnel Directorate. Vuono served a second tour in Vietnam starting in 1970, first as executive officer of the 1st Cavalry Division Artillery, before taking command of 1st Battalion, 77th Field Artillery Regiment. His awards during this time included the Bronze Star Medal with valor. In 1971, he was promoted to permanent major and served as the commander of the 1st Battalion, 21st Field Artillery Regiment.

After returning to the United States in 1971, Vuono served as an operations research systems analyst in the Analysis Group, Office of the Assistant Vice Chief of Staff of the Army. While in Washington, D.C., he also served as the executive officer of the Office of the Project Manager for Reorganization of the Army, in the Office of the Chief of Staff of the Army, until 1972. After attending the Army War College and graduating in 1973, he became chief of the Budget Division, in the Plans, Program, and Budget Directorate, Office of the Deputy Chief of Staff for Personnel, from 1973 to 1975. Vuono became a temporary colonel in 1974. From 1975 to 1976, he served as commander of the 82nd Airborne Division Artillery, and then as executive assistant to the Army chief of staff, General Bernard W. Rogers, until 1977.

=== General officer ===
Vuono visits soldiers training in Panama in May 1989

In 1977, he was made a temporary brigadier general and the assistant division commander of the 1st Infantry Division. In 1978 Vuono became a permanent lieutenant colonel. From 1979, he served as the deputy chief of staff for combat developments of the United States Army Training and Doctrine Command (TRADOC), until 1981. He became a temporary major general in 1980 and a permanent colonel in 1981. After that, Vuono became the commanding general of the 8th Infantry Division in Europe. In that post, Vuono had the division implement "sustainment training," which meant practicing individual and small unit tactics all year instead of focusing for peak performance on one unit test. Promoted to temporary lieutenant general in 1983, Vuono then concurrently served as the deputy commanding general of TRADOC, commanding general of Fort Leavenworth and the Army Combined Arms Center, and commandant of the Army Command and General Staff College, until 1985.

Vuono served as deputy chief of staff for operations and plans of the US Army from 1985 to 1986. He was promoted to full general in June 1986, which made him the youngest four-star general in the Army at the time, at the age of 52. He then served as the commanding general of Training and Doctrine Command from 1986 to 1987. While serving as the head of TRADOC, Vuono told officers there to focus on the Army's future, beyond the year 2000, and also took them to Civil War battlefields, where he had them study maps, orders of battle, and biographies of generals. After being nominated by President Ronald Reagan on 31 March 1987 to succeed General John A. Wickham Jr., Vuono became the 31st chief of staff of the United States Army on 23 June 1987. He had served as a four-star general for less than a year before his appointment to the Army's top post.

During his tenure, Vuono authorized the creation of the Army Acquisition Corps. He agreed in April 1990 to a plan that would reduce the size of the Army from 764,000 to 580,000 within seven years, which was seen as being part of the "peace dividend" at the end of the Cold War. He presided over the Army as its shifted its focus from its Cold War emphasis on the Soviet Union to other challenges, and was involved in the coordination of the Army's efforts during Operation Just Cause in Panama and during the Gulf War against Saddam Hussein's Iraq. Before the invasion of Panama, he flew there to ask General Frederick Woerner, the head of United States Southern Command, to resign, on behalf of President George H. W. Bush. Vuono then asked Maxwell Thurman to take his place.

Vuono's awards included the Defense, Army, Navy, Air Force, and Coast Guard Distinguished Service Medals. He stepped down on 21 July 1991 and subsequently retired from the Army.

== Later life ==
After his retirement from the army, Vuono joined Military Professional Resources Inc. (MPRI), a private military company, in 1993. Since 1999 he has served as the CEO of MPRI. L-3 Communications acquired MPRI in June 2000 at which point Vuono was offered a senior management position at L-3 Communications.

In 2003, he received the Distinguished Graduate Award from the West Point Association of Graduates.

== Awards and decorations ==
His awards include:

Personal decorations
Defense Distinguished Service Medal
Army Distinguished Service Medal with two bronze oak leaf clusters
Navy Distinguished Service Medal
Air Force Distinguished Service Medal
Coast Guard Distinguished Service Medal
Legion of Merit
Bronze Star Medal with "V" Device and four oak leaf clusters
Meritorious Service Medal
Air Medal (12 awards)
Army Commendation Medal with four oak leaf clusters
Unit awards
Meritorious Unit Commendation
Campaign and service medals
National Defense Service Medal with one service star
Vietnam Service Medal with four Service stars
Service, training, and marksmanship awards
Army Service Ribbon
Army Overseas Service Ribbon with bronze award numeral 2
Foreign awards
Order of Military Merit (Grand Cross) (Brazil)
Order of National Security Merit (Korea) Gugseon Medal
National Order of Merit (France) (Commander)
Gallantry Cross (Vietnam) with Silver Star
Vietnam Armed Forces Honor Medal 1st class
Vietnam Gallantry Cross Unit Citation
Civil Actions Medal Unit Citation (Vietnam)
Vietnam Campaign Medal

Other accoutrements
Master Parachutist Badge
Joint Chiefs of Staff Identification Badge
Army Staff Identification Badge
1st Cavalry Division shoulder sleeve insignia

Military offices
Preceded by Jack W. "Neil" Merritt	Commandant of the United States Army Command and General Staff College; 1983–1985	Succeeded by Robert W. RisCassi
Preceded by William R. Richardson	Commanding General of the United States Army Training and Doctrine Command; 1986–1987	Succeeded by Maxwell R. Thurman
Preceded by John A. Wickham Jr.	Chief of Staff of the United States Army; 1987–1991	Succeeded by Gordon R. Sullivan
