= Gerald T. Bartlett =

United States Army general

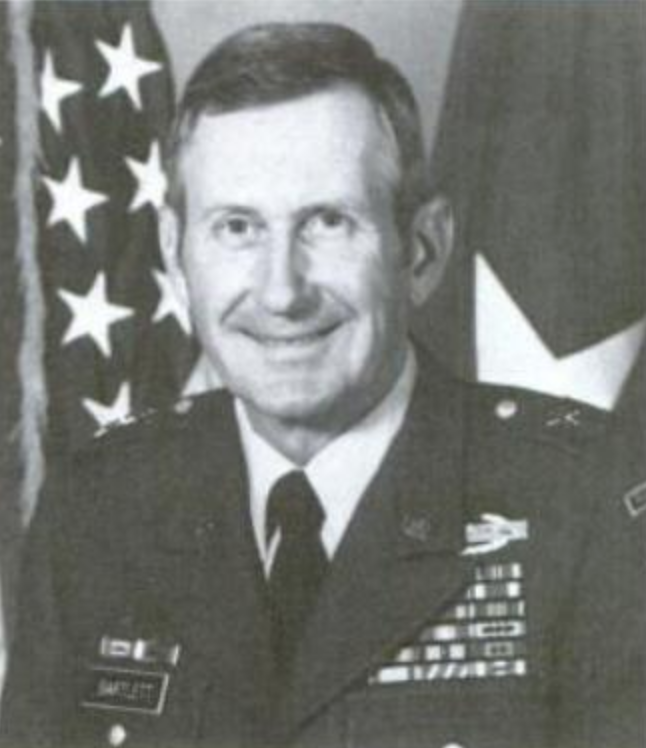
- Born: January 7, 1936 (age 90); Stockton, California, U.S.
- Military career
- Allegiance: United States
- Branch: United States Army
- Rank: Lieutenant general
- Commands: Commandant of the United States Army Command and General Staff College

Gerald T. Bartlett (born January 7, 1936) is a retired lieutenant general in the United States Army. He was Commandant of the United States Army Command and General Staff College from June 10, 1986, to July 13, 1988. He later retired as deputy commanding general of the United States Training and Doctrine Command.
