= Howard F. Stone =

United States Army general (1931–2024)

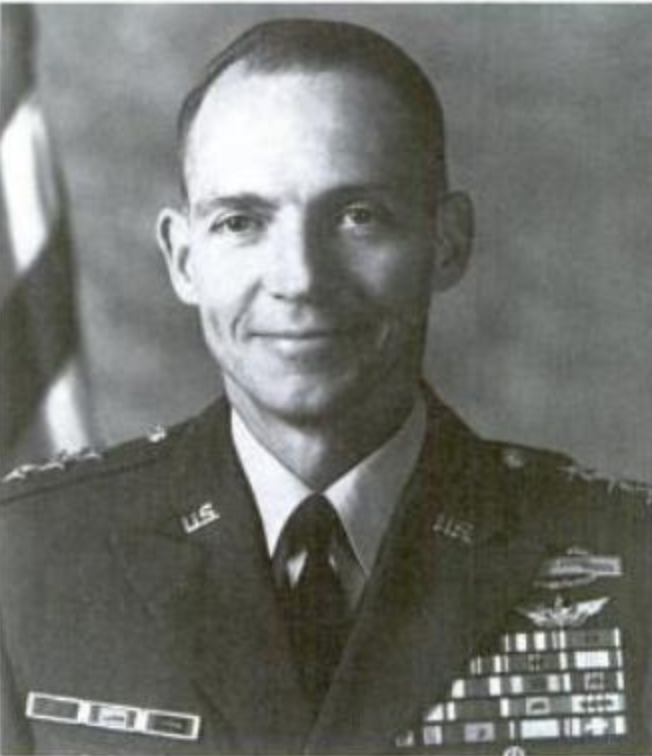
- Born: May 25, 1931; Monett, Missouri, U.S.
- Died: September 11, 2024 (aged 93); Tacoma, Washington, U.S.
- Military career
- Allegiance: United States
- Branch: United States Army
- Rank: Lieutenant General
- Commands: Commandant of the United States Army Command and General Staff College

Howard Francis Stone (May 25, 1931 – September 11, 2024) was a lieutenant general in the United States Army. He was Commandant of the United States Army Command and General Staff College from August 24, 1981, to June 25, 1982. He later served as Chief of Staff of the United States European Command. Stone received a B.S. degree from the United States Military Academy in 1955 and later earned an M.A. degree in public administration from the University of Oklahoma. Stone died in Tacoma, Washington on September 11, 2024, at the age of 93.
