= 589th Brigade Support Battalion (United States) =

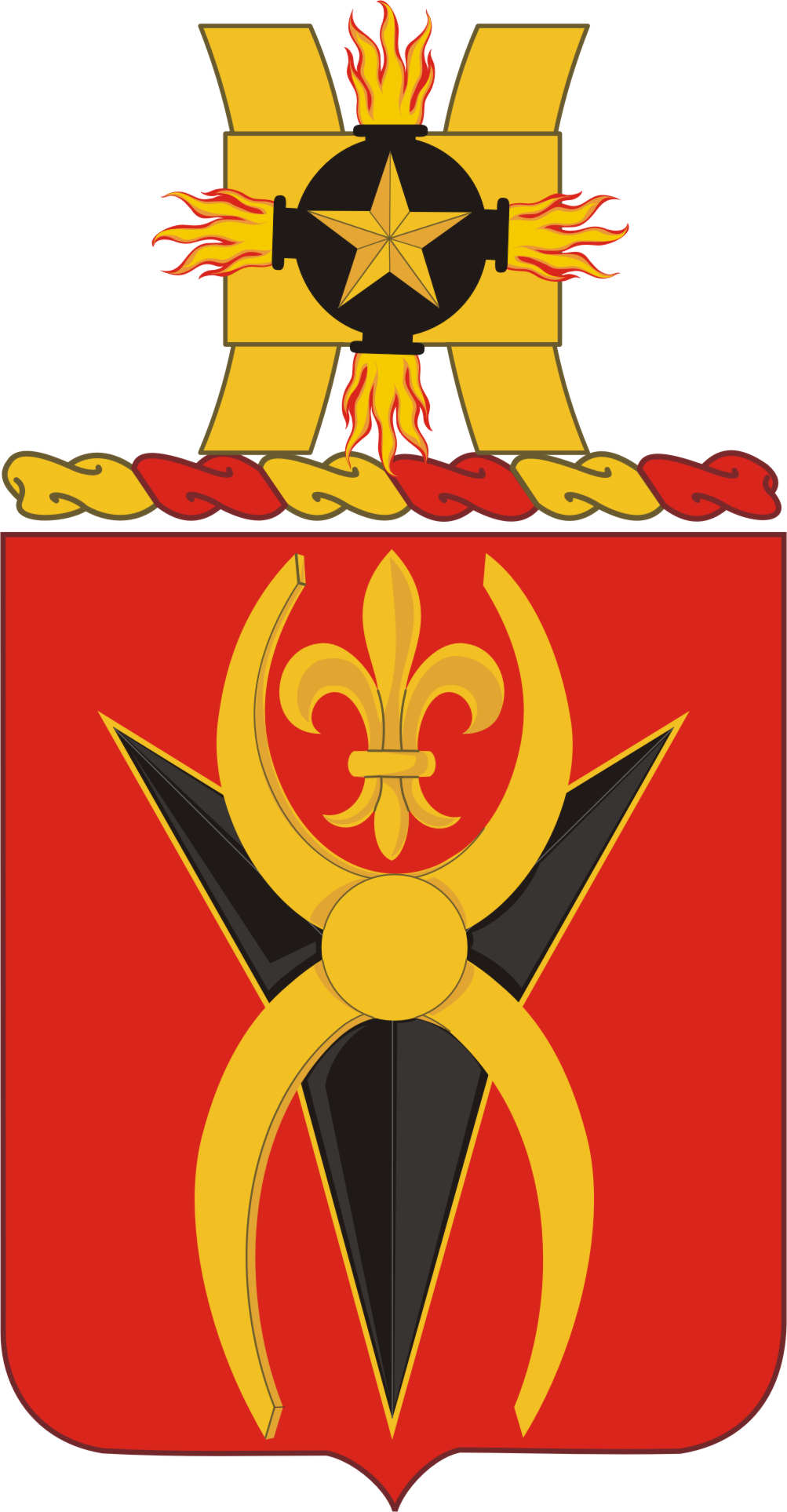
- 589th Support Battalion coat of arms
- Active: 1944-2015; 2019-present
- Country: United States
- Branch: US Army
- Type: Support
- Role: Brigade support
- Size: Battalion
- Part of: 41st Field Artillery Brigade
- Garrison/HQ: Grafenwöhr (Germany)
- Motto: First With Honor
- Engagements: World War II: Rhineland; Ardennes-Alsace; Central Europe

Insignia
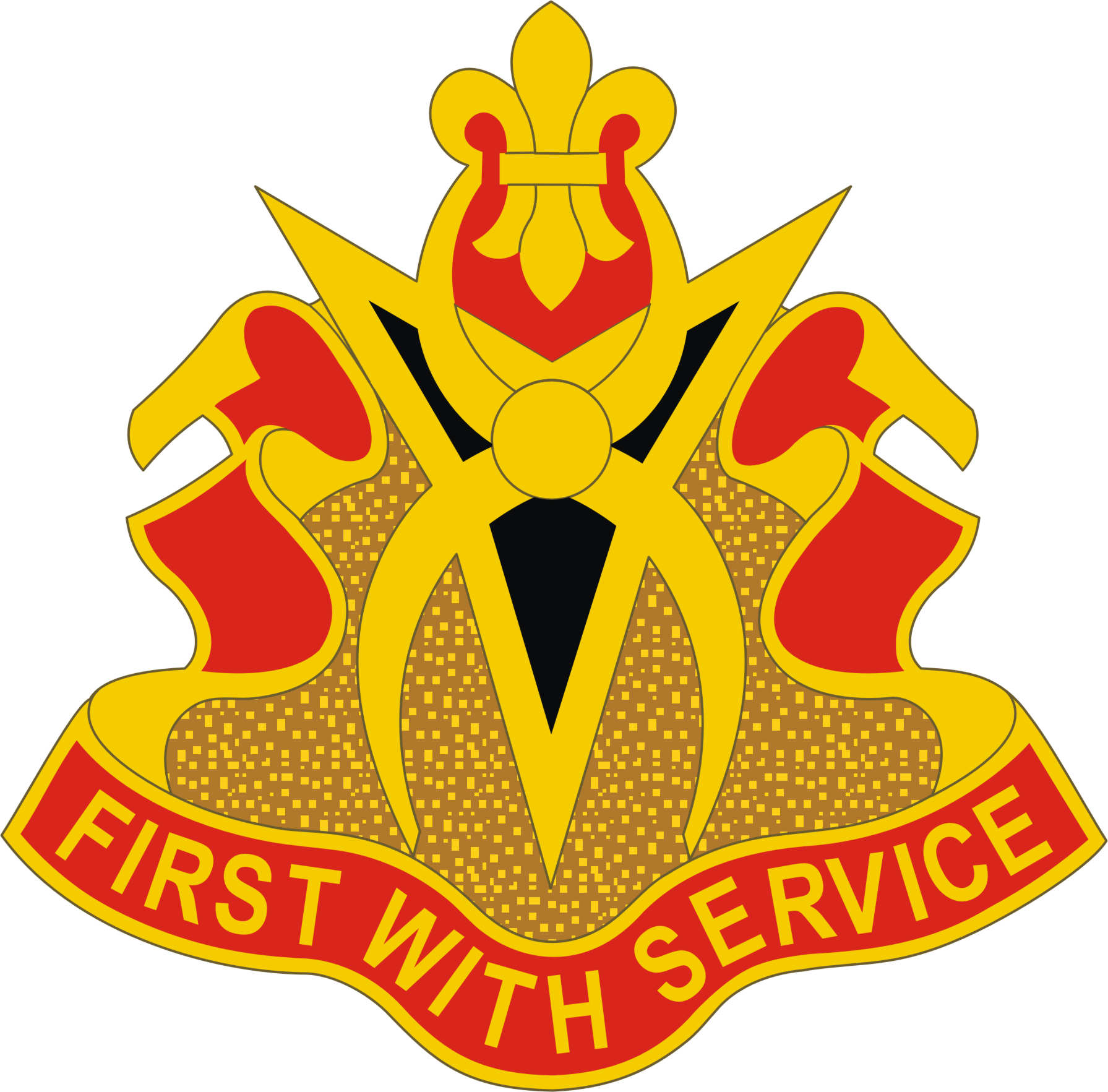
- Distinctive unit insignia

The 589th Brigade Support Battalion (589th BSB) is a support unit in the 41st Field Artillery Brigade stationed at Grafenwöhr, Germany. The unit was reactivated on 11 January 2019.

== History ==
The 589th BSB was originally constituted 31 July 1944 in the Army of the United States as Headquarters and Headquarters Detachment, 589th Quartermaster Battalion, Mobile. The unit was officially activated 29 July 1944 in England.

On 1 August 1946 the 589th was converted and redesignated as Headquarters and Headquarters Detachment, 589th Quartermaster Battalion. It was later inactivated 20 June 1948 in France. On 5 October 1948 the 589th was redesignated as Headquarters and Headquarters Detachment, 425th Quartermaster Battalion, allotted to the Organized Reserve Corps, and assigned to the Third Army and was activated 19 October 1948 at Tampa, Florida.

The unit was once again inactivated on 1 December 1950 at Tampa, Florida and then later redesigned 15 January 1952 as Headquarters and Headquarters Detachment, 589th Quartermaster Battalion, withdrawn for the Organized Reserve Corps and allotted to the Regular Army.

On 31 January 1952 at Fort Lee, Virginia the 589th was activated and shortly after inactivated on 10 December 1957 at Fort Lee, Virginia.

The unit was redesignated 10 May 1967 as Headquarters and Headquarters Company, 589th Supply and Service Battalion and activated 15 August 1967 at Fort Hood, Texas. It was Inactivated 20 December 1968 at Fort Hood, Texas.

On 6 July 2004 the unit was redesignated as the 589th Support Battalion and placed into the newly formed 4th Infantry Divisions Fires Brigade at Fort Hood, Texas as part of the Army's modular transformation. The 589th Support Battalion deployed in 2005-2006 as part of the 4th Infantry Division's Fires Brigade where it operated out of Camp Liberty, Iraq, earning the Meritorious Unit Commendation in support of Operation Iraqi Freedom.

On 16 April 2007, 4th Fires Brigade reflagged to 41st Fires Brigade, Fort Hood, Texas.

From 10 June 2008 to 3 August 2009, The 589th Support Battalion was again deployed in support of Operation Iraqi Freedom where it earned the Meritorious Unit Commendation.

On 2 June 2015 the 589th Brigade Support Battalion was inactivated at Ft. Hood, TX as a result of the 41st Field Artillery Brigade Transformation to the 1st Cavalry Division Artillery (DIVARTY).

On 11 January 2019 the 589th Brigade Support Battalion was reactivated in Grafenwöhr to support 41st Field Artillery Brigade, which was activated on 30 November 2018.

== 41st Fires Brigade ==
On 16 April 2007, 4th Fires Brigade reflagged to 41st Fires Brigade, Fort Hood, Texas until the brigade's deactivation in June 2015.

On 11 January 2019, 589th BSB again joined the 41st Fires Brigade, this time in Grafenwöhr, Germany.

== Honors ==
Conflict	Streamer	Year(s)
World War II	Rhineland	15 September 1944 - 21 March 1945
World War II	Ardennes-Alsace	16 December 1944 - 25 January 1945
World War II	Central Europe	22 March - 11 May 1945
Iraq	Campaigns to be determined	

== Decorations ==
Ribbon	Award	Year	Notes
	Meritorious Unit Commendation (Army)	2005-2006	Iraq
	Meritorious Unit Commendation (Army)	2008-2009	Iraq
