= 4th Infantry Division Artillery =

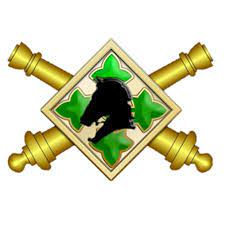
- Active: 1916–2007, 2014–present
- Country: United States of America
- Branch: United States Army
- Type: Artillery
- Role: Division Force Fires Headquarters
- Size: Brigade
- Part of: 4th Infantry Division
- Garrison/HQ: Fort Carson, Colorado
- Nickname: Ivy Gunners
- Patron: St. Barbara
- Motto: IVY GUNNERS!
- Colors: Red and Gold
- Engagements: World War I World War II; Vietnam; Operation Iraqi Freedom

Commanders
- Current commander: COL Charles M. Knoll
- Command Sergeant Major: CSM Juan Lozano
- Notable commanders: LTG David Valcourt, 1996–98, MG Edwin Babbitt, 1918–19

The 4th Infantry Division Artillery ("Ivy Gunners") or DIVARTY is the force fires headquarters for the 4th Infantry Division of the United States Army. The 4th DIVARTY has been active from 1917 to 1921, 1935–1939, 1940–1946, 1948–1995, 1996–2007, and most recently reactivated in 2015. The DIVARTY has operational service in World War I, World War II, Vietnam, and Operation Iraqi Freedom.

== History ==
The unit was first constituted 19 November 1917 as Headquarters Battery, 4th Field Artillery Brigade, and assigned to the 4th Infantry Division. The unit was organized for combat operations at Camp Greene, North Carolina from 15 December 1917 to 10 January 1918. In the winter of 1918, the 4th Field Artillery Brigade departed for World War I in Europe.

Upon returning stateside, the 4th Field Artillery Brigade was stationed at Camp Lewis, Washington, where it was inactivated 21 September 1921. 4th Field Artillery Brigade was redesignated as Headquarters and Headquarters Battery, 4th Field Artillery Brigade at Fort Sill, Oklahoma, 1 January 1935, and then disbanded 14 November 1939. Headquarters and Headquarters Battery, 4th Field Artillery was reconstituted 10 September 1940 as Headquarters and Headquarters Battery, 4th Division Artillery (DIVARTY). Headquarters and Headquarters Battery, 4th Division Artillery was activated 1 October 1940 at Fort Benning, Georgia. The unit participated in multiple campaigns of World War II. The 4th Division Artillery was inactivated 5 March 1946, at Camp Butler, North Carolina. On 6 July 1948, at Fort Ord, California, Headquarters and Headquarters Battery, 4th Division Artillery, was again activated.

1 April 1957 at Fort Lewis, Washington, Headquarters and Headquarters Battery, 4th Division Artillery was reorganized and redesignated as Headquarters and Headquarters Battery, 4th Infantry DIVARTY. By December 1970, the unit returned from South Vietnam to Fort Carson, Colorado. During that same year, the unit redesignated as Headquarters and Headquarters Battery, 4th Infantry Division Artillery (Mechanized). This redesignation named the Division Artillery the "Iron Gunners," which complemented the "Ironhorse" Division. With the realignment and downsizing of the Army force, the unit was reassigned to Fort Hood, Texas on 15 December 1995. On 16 December 2004, the transformation and restructuring of the 4th Infantry Division Artillery marked the Army's first modular fires brigade. The brigade inactivated 16 April 2007, at Fort Hood, Texas because of the realignment of Army units. On 6 May 2015, the unit was redesignated as Headquarters and Headquarters Battery, 4th Infantry Division Artillery at Fort Carson, Colorado, and unfurled its colors on Founders Field 14 May 2015. In 2016, the 4th Division Artillery was renamed the "Ivy Gunners" to complement the "Ivy Division".

== Organization ==
- 4th Infantry Division Artillery
  - Headquarters and Headquarters Battery, 4th Division Artillery
  - 2nd Battalion, 12th Field Artillery Regiment (Viking)
  - 3rd Battalion, 29th Field Artillery Regiment (Pacesetters)
  - 2nd Battalion, 77th Field Artillery Regiment (Steel)

== Lineage and honors ==
=== Lineage ===
- Constituted 19 November 1917 in the Regular Army as Headquarters, 4th Field Artillery Brigade, and assigned to the 4th Division.
- Organized 15 December 1917 – 10 January 1918 at Camp Greene, North Carolina.
- Reorganized and redesignated in February 1921 as Headquarters and Headquarters Battery, 4th Field Artillery Brigade.
- Inactivated 21 September 1921 at Camp Lewis, Washington.
- Activated 1 January 1935 at Fort Sill, Oklahoma.
- Disbanded 14 November 1939 at Fort Sill, Oklahoma.
- Reconstituted 10 September 1940 in the Regular Army and redesignated as Headquarters and Headquarters Battery, 4th Division Artillery.
- Activated 1 October 1940 at Fort Benning, Georgia.
- Reorganized and redesignated 11 July 1941 as Headquarters and Headquarters Battery, 4th Motorized Division Artillery.
- Reorganized and redesignated 4 August 1943 as Headquarters and Headquarters Battery, 4th Division Artillery.
- Inactivated 5 March 1946 at Camp Butner, North Carolina.
- Activated 6 July 1948 at Fort Ord, California.
- Redesignated 1 April 1957 as Headquarters and Headquarters Battery, 4th Infantry Division Artillery.
- Inactivated 15 December 1995 at Fort Carson, Colorado.
- Activated 16 January 1996 at Fort Hood, Texas.
- Redesignated 15 December 2004 as Headquarters and Headquarters Battery, 4th Fires Brigade.
- Inactivated 15 April 2007 at Fort Hood, Texas. HHB Redesignated as Headquarters and Headquarters Battery, 41st Field Artillery Brigade
- Activated 15 October 2015 at Fort Carson, Colorado

=== Campaign participation credit ===
- World War I: Aisne-Marne; St. Mihiel; Meuse-Argonne; Champagne 1918; Lorrain 1918
- World War II: Normandy; Northern France; Rhineland; Ardennes-Alsace; Central Europe
- Vietnam: Counteroffensive, Phase II; Counteroffensive, Phase III; Tet Counteroffensive; Counteroffensive, Phase IV; Counteroffensive, Phase V; Counteroffensive, Phase VI; Tet 69/Counteroffensive; Summer–Fall 1969; Winter–Spring 1970; Sanctuary Counteroffensive; Counteroffensive, Phase VII
- War on Terrorism: Campaigns to be Determined

=== Decorations ===
- Belgian Fourragere 1940 (Headquarters and Headquarters Battery, 4th Infantry Division Artillery, cited; DA GO 43, 1950)
- Cited in the Order of the Day of the Belgian Army for action in Belgium (Headquarters and Headquarters Battery, 4th Infantry Division Artillery, cited; DA GO 43, 1950)
- Cited in the Order of the Day of the Belgian Army for action in the Ardennes (Headquarters and Headquarters Battery, 4th Infantry Division Artillery, cited; DA GO 43, 1950)
- Republic of Vietnam Cross of Gallantry with Palm, Streamer embroidered VIETNAM 1966–1969 (Headquarters and Headquarters Battery, 4th Infantry Division Artillery, cited; DA GO 3, 1970)
- Republic of Vietnam Civil Action Honor Medal, First Class, Streamer embroidered VIETNAM 1966–1969 (Headquarters and Headquarters Battery, 4th Infantry Division Artillery, cited; DA GO 53, 1970)
