= John William Vessey Jr. =

Career officer in the United States Army (1922–2016)

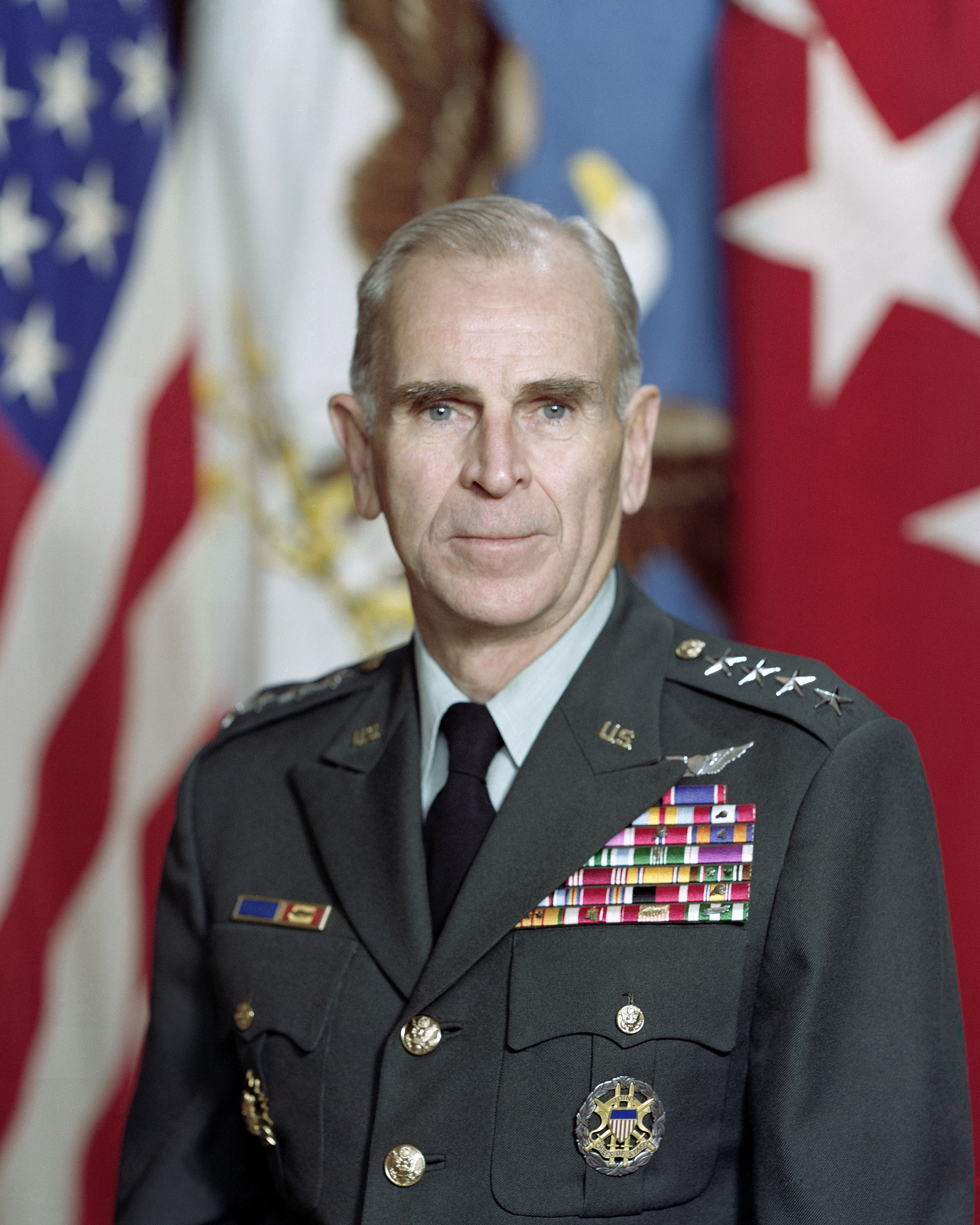
- Official portrait, 1983
- Born: 29 June 1922; Minneapolis, Minnesota, U.S.
- Died: 18 August 2016 (aged 94); North Oaks, Minnesota, U.S.
- Burial place: Minnesota State Veterans Cemetery, Little Falls, Minnesota
- Military career
- Allegiance: United States
- Branch: United States Army; Army National Guard
- Service years: 1939–1985
- Rank: General
- Nickname: "Jack"
- Units: Field Artillery Branch; Minnesota Army National Guard
- Commands: Chairman of the Joint Chiefs of Staff; Republic of Korea-United States Combined Forces Command; 8th United States Army; United States Forces Korea; 4th Infantry Division (Mechanized); Military Assistance Advisory Group Laos; U.S. Army Supply Thailand; 3rd Armored Division Artillery; 2nd Battalion, 77th Field Artillery
- Conflicts: World War II; Vietnam War
- Awards: Distinguished Service Cross; Defense Distinguished Service Medal (2); Army Distinguished Service Medal (3); Navy Distinguished Service Medal; Air Force Distinguished Service Medal; Legion of Merit (2); Bronze Star Medal (2); Presidential Medal of Freedom

John William Vessey Jr. (29 June 1922 – 18 August 2016) was a career officer in the United States Army. He attained the rank of general, and was most notable for his service as the tenth chairman of the Joint Chiefs of Staff.

A native of Minneapolis, Vessey began his 46-year military career in 1939 when he joined the Minnesota Army National Guard's 59th Field Artillery Brigade, a unit of the 34th Infantry Division. His unit was activated for World War II, and he took part in combat in the North African and Italian Campaigns. Vessey received a battlefield commission to second lieutenant during the Battle of Anzio, and served as a field artillery forward observer until the end of the war. After the war, Vessey advanced through positions of increasing rank and responsibility. During the Vietnam War, he served as executive officer of the 25th Infantry Division Artillery and acting commander of 2nd Battalion, 77th Field Artillery, and he received the Distinguished Service Cross for heroism during the Battle of Suoi Tre. He served as commander of the 3rd Armored Division Artillery from 1967 to 1969, and division chief of staff from 1969 to 1970.

Vessey was promoted to brigadier general in 1970, and assigned as commander of U.S. Army Support Command, Thailand (USARSUPTHAI), a logistics support area for soldiers and airmen serving in Vietnam and Thailand. He commanded U.S. military activities in Laos from 1973 to 1974, when he was promoted to major general as commander of the 4th Infantry Division. In 1975, Vessey was promoted to lieutenant general and assigned as the Army's deputy chief of staff for operations and plans, G-3. He was promoted to general in 1976, and named to command United States Forces Korea and the Eighth United States Army. In 1978, Vessey also assumed command of the Republic of Korea-United States Combined Forces Command. He served in South Korea until 1979, when he was assigned as Vice Chief of Staff of the United States Army.

In 1982, President Ronald Reagan named Vessey as Chairman of the Joint Chiefs of Staff. He served until retiring in October 1985. After leaving the Army, Vessey became involved in efforts to account for military personnel listed as missing in action, and made several trips to Southeast Asia to search for remains as part of resolving the Vietnam War POW/MIA issue. He was awarded the Presidential Medal of Freedom in 1992. Vessey died in North Oaks, Minnesota, on 18 August 2016. He was buried at the Minnesota State Veterans Cemetery north of Little Falls.

== Early life and education ==
Vessey was born in Minneapolis, Minnesota, on 29 June 1922, the son of John William Vessey and Emily Katherine (Roche) Vessey. He attended the schools of Minneapolis, and was 16 in May 1939 when he claimed to be 18 so that he could enlist in the Minnesota Army National Guard. Vessey was assigned as a motorcycle courier in the 59th Field Artillery Brigade, 34th Infantry Division. In 1940, he graduated from Roosevelt High School. In February 1941, his unit was activated for training and mobilization in anticipation of U.S. participation in World War II.

== Military career ==
=== World War II ===
Vessey served with the 34th Infantry Division throughout its World War II service. The experience of early American setbacks in North Africa left Vessey with a lifelong appreciation of the need for realistic combat training, modern equipment, physical fitness, and air-ground cooperation. When Major General Omar Bradley, commander of II Corps in North Africa, launched the U.S. drive on Bizerte in April 1943, he gave the 34th the most difficult objective: the well-defended Hill 609. In the first clear-cut U.S. Army victory of the campaign, the 34th Division took its objective, opening the way for the U.S. advance on Bizerte. Vessey, who had been a first sergeant since 1 September 1942, later described being a first sergeant in combat as the toughest job he had. Vessey was with the 34th when it went ashore on the Anzio beachhead in Italy in May 1944; there he received a battlefield commission as a second lieutenant, after which he served as a forward observer.

=== Korean War and afterwards ===
After the war, most of Vessey's service continued to be in field artillery assignments. In the 1950s, he served with the 4th Infantry Division in Germany and the Eighth U.S. Army in the Republic of Korea after the Korean War. During this period, Vessey also attended the Command and General Staff College at Fort Leavenworth, Kansas.

By the time Vessey became a lieutenant colonel, he had earned enough credits through night school and correspondence courses for a Bachelor of Science degree in military science, which he received from the University of Maryland University College in 1963. In 1965, he received a Master of Science degree in business administration from George Washington University. From 1963 to 1965, Vessey commanded 2nd Battalion, 73rd Field Artillery, 3rd Armored Division; then he spent a year as a student at the Industrial College of the Armed Forces.

=== Vietnam War ===
During the Vietnam War, Vessey served for a year as Executive Officer of the 25th Infantry Division Artillery in Vietnam. In March 1967, when acting as commander of the 2nd Battalion, 77th Artillery, he was given the mission of establishing a fire support base at Suoi Tre during Operation Junction City. Deep in enemy-controlled territory, Vessey and his men oriented the firebase's defenses on the enemy's likely avenues of approach and rehearsed counterattack plans. During an attack by a reinforced regiment, the base was partially overrun. Vessey and his men fired their howitzers directly into the enemy ranks. Although greatly outnumbered, the defenders, aided by gunships and artillery, killed four hundred of their assailants while successfully defending the firebase. Lieutenant Colonel Vessey received the Distinguished Service Cross for his actions during the battle.

From Vietnam, Vessey went to Germany to serve first as Commander of the 3rd Armored Division Artillery from October 1967 until March 1969 and then as Division Chief of Staff for a year. He was promoted to colonel in November 1967. As a colonel, he was a student at the Army helicopter school at the age of 48. Vessey went back to Southeast Asia in December 1970 to head the U.S. Army Support Command, Thailand. In January 1972, he went into Laos to coordinate all US military operations in support of the war in that country. Vessey worked with the U.S. ambassador, the CIA station chief, and an assortment of military contingents. When the Laotian ceasefire came in February 1973, the Royal Lao government controlled all the major cities and the vast majority of the population.

=== After the Vietnam War ===
Upon his return to the United States, Vessey became Director of Operations in the Office of the Deputy Chief of Staff for Operations and Plans. Promoted to major general in August 1974, he assumed command of the 4th Infantry Division (Mechanized) at Fort Carson, Colorado. Promoted to lieutenant general in September 1975, Vessey became the Army's Deputy Chief of Staff for Operations and Plans.

Vessey received his fourth star in 1976. From 1976 to 1979, he served in the Republic of Korea as Commanding General of the Eighth U.S. Army; Commander of U.S. Forces, Korea; and Commander in Chief of the United Nations Command. In 1978, Vessey became the first Commander in Chief of the Republic of Korea-United States Combined Forces Command. His tour was marked by increased military tension, caused by evidence of a North Korean buildup and by President Jimmy Carter's 1977 announcement that U.S. ground forces would be withdrawn. Vessey worked to assuage South Korean concerns and change the President's decision. After Carter's 1979 visit, withdrawal plans were suspended and then cancelled. From July 1979 until June 1982, Vessey served as Vice Chief of Staff of the United States Army.

=== Chairmanship of the Joint Chiefs of Staff ===
On 18 June 1982, Vessey became the tenth Chairman of the Joint Chiefs of Staff and the last World War II combat veteran to serve in the position. Vessey was the only chairman who had been neither a service chief nor a commander of a unified or specified command. He served as chairman during a period of unprecedented growth in peacetime defense spending and an expanded U.S. military presence worldwide intended to counter growing Soviet military power.

Vessey and the service chiefs believed that their overriding task lay in convincing Soviet leaders that their quest for military superiority and geostrategic advantage was fruitless. In Europe, they pushed the controversial but successful deployment of Pershing II and ground-launched cruise missiles to offset the Soviet SS-20 missiles. In southwest Asia, highly visible US military activities underscored the US commitment to defend its vital interests in the region. In Central America, training and intelligence were provided to support counter-insurgency efforts.

In June 1982, Vessey received the Golden Plate Award of the American Academy of Achievement presented by his predecessor, Awards Council member General David C. Jones, USAF.

Believing that it was a mistake to commit a superpower's forces to a peacekeeping mission, Vessey and the Joint Chiefs in 1982 and 1983 advised against deployment of a Marine contingent to Lebanon as part of a multinational peacekeeping force intended to restore peace among warring factions there. Their advice was not taken, and on 23 October 1983, a truck-bomb attack on the Marine headquarters building in Beirut killed 241 US Marines and Army soldiers. In February 1984, President Ronald Reagan withdrew the contingent from Lebanon.

Secretary of Defense Caspar Weinberger understood the importance of decentralization; he authorized Vessey to direct military operations on the Secretary's behalf. The 1983 Grenada operation, for example, was planned by Atlantic Command, reviewed by the Joint Chiefs, and approved by Secretary Weinberger and the President—all in four days. Vessey oversaw execution of the operation that rescued US citizens and brought a pro-US government into power. On 30 October 1983, Vessey made a one-day inspection visit to the island and left his personal mark on the 8-day operation. He urged the on-scene commanders to move aggressively to secure full control of the multi-island nation and also improve living conditions for 666 Cuban detainees. On his return home, Vessey faced a firestorm from the American news media over the Pentagon's actions barring journalists from the battlefield until the third day of the operation. Vessey responded to the criticism by appointing a study group, known as the Sidle Panel, which recommended new guidelines for military-media relations that he embraced as Pentagon policy the following year.

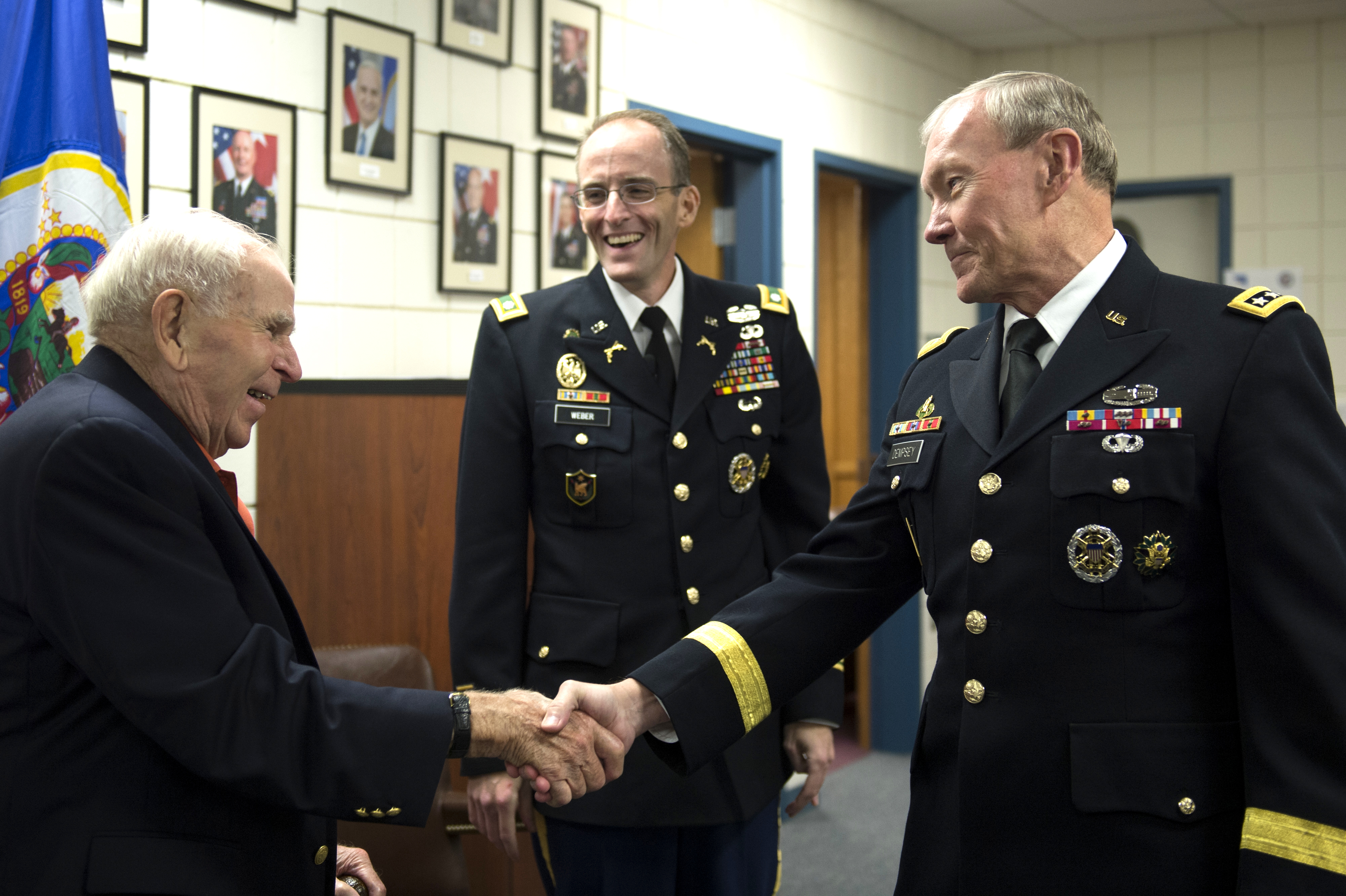
Vessey (left), greets U.S. Army general and Joint Chiefs chairman Martin E. Dempsey (right) at the Minnesota National Guard Armory in Rosemount, Minnesota, on 16 August 2012

During Vessey's tenure, there was increased emphasis on space as a theater of operations. In early 1983, the Joint Chiefs mentioned to the President that defense against nuclear-armed missiles might be technically feasible in the next century. To their surprise, Reagan seized upon the concept and on 23 March 1983, announced his vision of the Strategic Defense Initiative (SDI). Realizing the enormous military advantages to be gained from operations in space and to support SDI, the JCS recommended the establishment of a unified command for space. US Space Command was activated on 23 September 1985.

=== Vietnamese emissary ===
Vessey retired on 30 September 1985, several months before the expiration of his second term as Chairman. He was the last four-star World War II combat veteran on active duty and, with forty-six years of service, had served the longest of anyone then in the Army. President Reagan praised Vessey and gave a moving speech on his behalf. The President pointed out that Vessey had served in many leadership positions in his career and stated:

Jack Vessey always remembered the soldiers in the ranks; he understood those soldiers are the background of any army. He noticed them, spoke to them, looked out for them. Jack Vessey never forgot what it was like to be an enlisted man, to be just a GI.

In retirement, he served President Reagan and his successors, Presidents George H. W. Bush and Bill Clinton, as a special emissary to Vietnam on the question of American service personnel missing from the Vietnam War. For his work in Vietnam, General Vessey was awarded the prestigious Sylvanus Thayer Award from the United States Military Academy in 1996. He was also awarded the nation's highest civilian award, the Presidential Medal of Freedom, in 1992.

== Personal life ==
Vessey married Avis Claire Funk in 1945. They had two sons, John III and David, and a daughter, Sarah.

Vessey died in North Oaks, Minnesota, on 18 August 2016, aged 94.

== Summary of service ==
=== Dates of rank ===
Rank insignia	Rank	Date
No insignia	Private (Minnesota National Guard)	May 1939
	First Sergeant	1 September 1942
	Second Lieutenant	6 May 1944 (Battlefield Commission)
	First Lieutenant	1 April 1946 (permanent on June 13, 1951)
	Captain	4 January 1951 (permanent on 29 October 1954)
	Major	14 May 1958 (permanent on 26 January 1962)
	Lieutenant Colonel	7 January 1963 (permanent on 2 January 1969)
	Colonel	28 November 1967 (permanent 12 March 1973)
	Brigadier General	1 April 1971 (permanent 23 December 1974)
	Major General	1 August 1974 (permanent 23 August 1976)
	Lieutenant General	1 September 1975
	General	1 November 1976

=== Awards and decorations ===
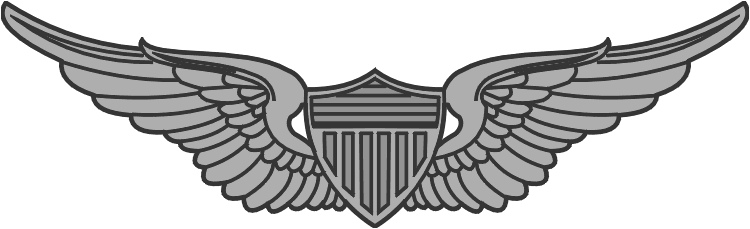

Unit Awards

Pocket Badges

Civilian Awards

Badge	Army Aviator Badge		
1st row	Distinguished Service Cross	Defense Distinguished Service Medal with oak leaf cluster	
2nd row	Army Distinguished Service Medal with two oak leaf clusters	Navy Distinguished Service Medal	Air Force Distinguished Service Medal
3rd row	Legion of Merit with oak leaf cluster	Bronze Star with oak leaf cluster	Purple Heart
4th row	Air Medal with award numeral 4	Joint Service Commendation Medal	Army Commendation Medal with "V" device
5th row	Army Good Conduct Medal	American Defense Service Medal	American Campaign Medal
6th row	European-African-Middle Eastern Campaign Medal with silver and bronze campaign stars	World War II Victory Medal	Army of Occupation Medal
7th row	National Defense Service Medal with bronze campaign star	Vietnam Service Medal with two campaign stars	Croix de Guerre with bronze palm (France)
8th row	Order of Military Merit, Taeguk Cordon (Korea)	Vietnam Cross of Gallantry with bronze palm	Vietnam Campaign Medal
Unit awards	Presidential Unit Citation	Republic of Vietnam Gallantry Cross Unit Citation	Republic of Vietnam Civil Actions Medal Unit Citation
Pocket Badges	Army Staff Identification Badge	Joint Chiefs of Staff Identification Badge	
Civilian Awards	Presidential Medal of Freedom		

=== Assignments ===
- 1939: National Guard enlisted service
- 1941: 34th Division Artillery, Camp Claiborne, LA, Northern Ireland, North Africa, and Italy as S/Sgt, 1st Sgt, and then battlefield commission to 2Lt (Communications Officer/Forward Observer/Air Observer)
- 1945: US Army Field Artillery School, Fort Sill, OK
- 1949: Student, Field Artillery Officers Advanced Course, Field Artillery School, Fort Sill, OK
- 1950: Battery Officer; then Battery Commander, 18th Field Artillery, Fort Sill, OK
- 1951: Assistant S-3 and Liaison Officer; then Headquarters Battery Commander; then Assistant S-3 and Liaison Officer, 4th Infantry Division Artillery US Army, Europe
- 1954: Student, Artillery Officer Advanced Course, Artillery and Guided Missile School, Fort Sill, OK
- 1955: Battery Commander, Artillery and Guided Missile School Officer Candidate School
- 1956: Gunnery Instructor, Artillery and Guided Missile School, Fort Sill, OK
- 1957: Student, US Army Command and General Staff College, Fort Leavenworth, KS
- 1958: Artillery Section, Eighth US Army with duty station CINCPAC Coordination Center, Philippines
- 1958: Chief, Operations Branch, Artillery Section, Eighth US Army, Korea
- 1959: Assignment Officer, then Executive Officer, Artillery Officers Division, Office of Deputy Chief of Staff for Personnel, Washington, D.C.
- 1963: Student, Armed Forces Staff College, Norfolk, VA
- 1963: Commander, 2d Battalion, 73d Artillery, 3d Armored Division, US Army, Europe
- 1965: Student, Industrial College of the Armed Forces, Washington, D.C.
- 1966: Executive Officer, 25th Infantry Division Artillery, Vietnam
- 1967: Commander, 3d Armored Division Artillery, US Army, Europe
- 1969: Chief of Staff, 3d Armored Division, US Army, Europe
- 1970: Student, US Army Primary Helicopter School, Fort Wolters, TX; later US Army Aviation School, Fort Rucker, AL
- 1970: Commanding General, US Army Support Command, Thailand
- 1972: Deputy Chief, JUSMAGTHAI (Chief MAAG, Laos)
- 1973: Director of Operations, Office Deputy Chief of Staff for Operations and Plans, Washington, D.C.
- 1974: Commanding General, 4th Infantry Division (Mechanized), Fort Carson, CO
- 1975: Deputy Chief of Staff for Operations and Plans, US Army, Washington, D.C.
- 1976: Commanding General, Eighth US Army; and Commander in Chief, US Forces, Korea; and Commander in Chief, United Nations Command
- 1978: Commander in Chief, Republic of Korea-United States Combined Forces Command, Korea
- 1979: Vice Chief of Staff, US Army, Washington, D.C.
- 1982: Chairman, Joint Chiefs of Staff, Washington, D.C.

Military offices
Preceded by Frederick Kroesen	Vice Chief of Staff of the United States Army; 1979–1982	Succeeded by John A. Wickham Jr.
Preceded by David C. Jones	Chairman of the Joint Chiefs of Staff; 1982–1985	Succeeded by William J. Crowe
