= 41st Field Artillery Brigade (United States) =

- 41st Field Artillery Brigade Shoulder Sleeve Insignia
- Active: 1918; 1921–1931; 1942-1944; 1952-1969; 1972–2005; 2007–2015; 2018–present
- Country: United States
- Branch: Army
- Type: Artillery
- Role: Fire support
- Size: Brigade
- Part of: V Corps
- Garrison/HQ: Grafenwoehr Training Area, U.S. Army Garrison Bavaria, Germany (2018–present)
- Nickname: "Rail Gunners" (special designation)
- Motto: Ready Now
- Equipment: M270A2 MLRS, HIMARS
- Engagements: World War I World War II; Vietnam War; Operations Desert Shield & Desert Storm; Kosovo; Operation Iraqi Freedom

Insignia
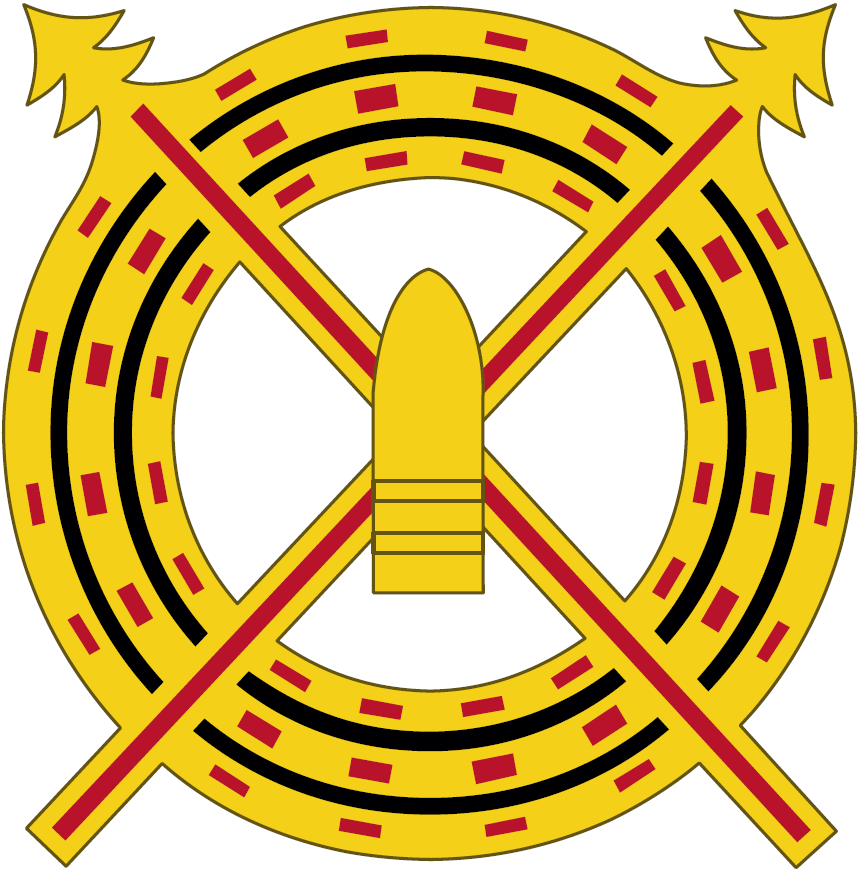
- Distinctive Unit Insignia

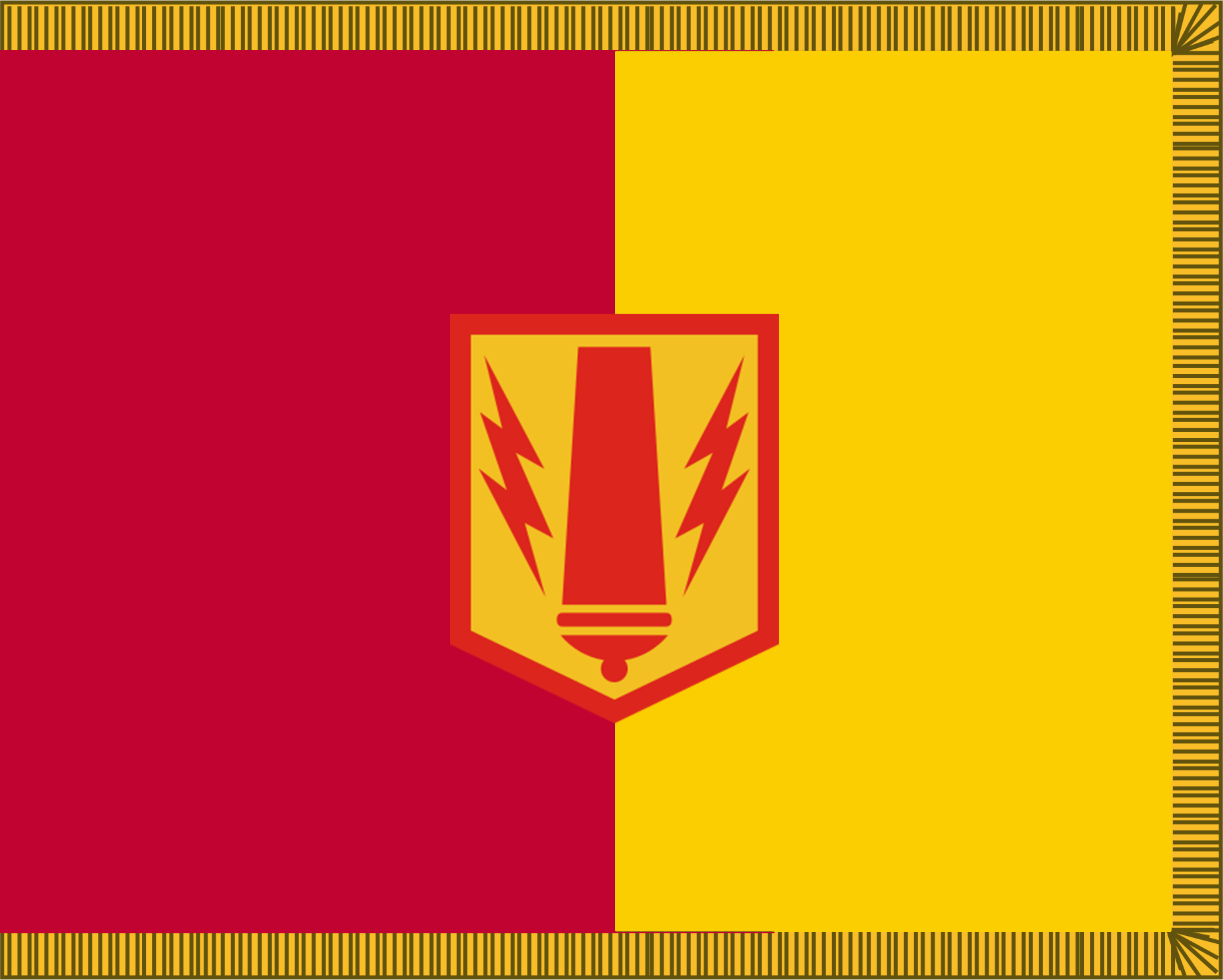
- 41st Field Artillery Brigade Flag

The 41st Field Artillery Brigade ("Rail Gunners)" is a Field Artillery Brigade of the United States Army. Initially only operating from October to December of 1918, it has since operated as a Brigade level staff from 1921 to 1931, 1942–1944, 1952–1969, 1972–2005, 2007–2015, and 2018 to present. It has been stationed in Virginia, Hawaii, Oklahoma, Texas, and Germany. It has served in World War II, Vietnam, Operations Desert Shield & Desert Storm, Kosovo, and Operation Iraqi Freedom.

== History ==
The 41st Fires Brigade traces its lineage back to the 41st Artillery Regiment (Coast Artillery Corps), a heavy artillery formation activated near the end of World War I.

The 41st Artillery was organized on 1 October 1918 at Fort Monroe, Virginia, and Archibald H. Sunderland was appointed as commander. On 22 December 1918 the unit was demobilized. On 15 January 1921, the colors were transferred to the Pacific Theater, where the 41st Artillery was reconstituted as the Hawaiian Railway Battalion. On 1 July 1924, the unit was redesignated as the 41st Coast Artillery and remained in Hawaii until its deactivation on 30 June 1931.

On 21 April 1942, the 41st Coast Artillery was re-activated, this time at Fort Hase, Hawaii, where it served until 25 May 1944. It was awarded the Asiatic Pacific Streamer for its role in World War II. At that time, it was retired from the rolls of the regular Army and incorporated into the Hawaiian Department.

On 28 June 1950, Headquarters Battery, 41st Coast Artillery was reconstituted as Headquarters and Headquarters Battery, 41st Field Artillery Group and was inactivated 18 January 1952 at Fort Sill, Oklahoma.

In April 1967, the 41st Field Artillery Group deployed to the Republic of Vietnam, where it earned nine campaign streamers. On 15 November 1969, the Group was inactivated and its colors returned to the United States.

On 15 March 1972, the 41st Field Artillery Group was re-activated in Babenhausen, West Germany. The unit was re-designated as the 41st Field Artillery Brigade on 16 June 1982, and was assigned to V Corps Artillery. In 1999 was deployed to Albania as part of Operation Task Force Hawk to potentially perform SEAD (Suppression of Enemy Air Defenses) missions, and to act as a command and control center for all artillery units involved in the operation. In 2003, the brigade deployed with V Corps to Iraq in support of Operation Iraqi Freedom. Following their service in Iraq, the unit was inactivated on 15 July 2005.

The 41st Fires Brigade was reactivated at Fort Hood, Texas on 16 April 2007 taking over the units of the inactivated 4th Fires Brigade. Slightly more than one year later, the 41st Fires Brigade again deployed to the Wasit Province of Iraq where it provided security and stabilization to the people of Iraq for 14 months.

In 2014, the Army changed the name of the brigade back to 41st Field Artillery Brigade, and announced that they would change in the coming year to 1st Cavalry Division Artillery, taking up responsibility for all of the artillery assets within the division. On 1 April 2015, 41st Field Artillery Brigade was inactivated and reflagged as the 1st Cavalry Division Artillery (United States).

On 30 November 2018, the 41st Field Artillery Brigade was re-activated at Tower Barracks, U.S. Army Garrison Bavaria, controlling the M270 Multiple Launch Rocket System-equipped 1st Battalion, 6th Field Artillery Regiment and 1st Battalion, 77th Field Artillery Regiment.

In September 2020 the 1st Battalion, 77th Field Artillery Regiment was reactivated with MLRS/HIMARS dual capability.

== Organization 2024 ==
As of August 2024 the 41st Field Artillery is organized as follows:

- 41st Field Artillery Brigade, in Grafenwöhr, Germany
  - Headquarters and Headquarters Battery
  - 1st Battalion, 6th Field Artillery Regiment (Centaurs) M270A2 MLRS
    - Headquarters and Headquarters Battery (Heartbreaker)
    - Alpha Battery (Arctic)
    - Bravo Battery (Black Eagles)
    - Charlie Battery (Cerberus)
    - 246th Forward Support Company (Fury)
  - 1st Battalion, 77th Field Artillery Regiment (Falcons First) (M270A2 MLRS)
    - Headquarters and Headquarters Battery
    - Alpha Battery (Apex)
    - Bravo Battery (Boar)
    - Charlie Battery (Chimera)
    - 538th Forward Support Company (Forsaken)
  - 589th Brigade Support Battalion
    - Headquarters and Headquarters Company, 589th Brigade Support Battalion
    - 232nd Signal Company

== Commanders ==
Ranks indicated are the highest ranks held by the individual, not necessarily the rank held at time of command.

=== 41st FA group ===
- Col. S.H. Wheeler, 1967
- Col. Archibald V. Arnold, 1969
- Col. Homer W. Kiefer, Jr., 1973–75
- Col. Charles Hoenstine, 1976–77
- Col. Kenneth R. Bailey
- Col. Edward J. Stein, Jr., Dec 1977 – July 1979

=== 41st FA Brigade ===
Commander	Term
COL August M. Cianciolo	July 1979 – May 1982
Maj. Gen. Fred F. Marty	May 1982 – September 1984
Col. Craig H. Leyda	1984
Col. James H. Chapman	1986–88
Col. David A. Schulte	1988–90
Col. George E. Newman III	September 1990–September 1992
Col. James R. Chambless	1992–94
Lt. Gen. Michael D. Maples	August 1994 – June 1996
Col. Stephen M. Seay	July 1996 – August 1998
Col. Michael T. Hayes	August 1998 – July 2000
Col. Jackson L. Flake III	July 2000 – July 2002
Col. Charles C. Otterstedt III	July 2002 – July 2004
Col. Gary D. Langford	July 2004 – July 2005

=== 41st Fires Brigade ===
- Col. Richard M. Francey, Jr., April 2007 – October 2009
- LTG John Thomson, III, Oct. 2009 – July 2011
- Col. William McRae, July 2011 – July 2014

=== 41st Field Artillery Brigade ===
- Col. Patrick Gaydon, July 2014 – April 2015 (brigade inactivated)
- Col. Seth Knazovich, October 2018 (brigade activated) – August 2020
- Col. Daniel G. Miller, August 2020 - August 2022
- Col. Wilbur W. Hsu, August 2022 - July 2024
- Col. Frank Maxwell, July 2024 - June 2026
- Col. David Henderson, June 2026 - present

== Honors and decorations ==
- Campaign participation credit

Conflict	Streamer	Year(s)
World War II	No Inscription	
Vietnam War	Counteroffensive, Phase II	1966–1967
Vietnam War	Counteroffensive, Phase III	1967–1968
Vietnam War	Tet Counteroffensive	1968
Vietnam War	Counteroffensive, Phase IV	1968
Vietnam War	Counteroffensive, Phase V	1968
Vietnam War	Counteroffensive, Phase VI	1968–1969
Vietnam War	Tet 69/Counteroffensive	1969
Vietnam War	Summer–Fall 1969	1969
Vietnam War	Winter–Spring 1970	1969–1970
Kosovo War	Operation Joint Forge	1995-6
Iraq	Campaigns to be determined	

- Decorations

Ribbon	Award	Year	Notes
	Meritorious Unit Commendation (Army)	2003	Iraq
	Meritorious Unit Commendation (Army)	1967-68	Vietnam
	Meritorious Unit Commendation (Army)	1968-69	Vietnam
	Republic of Vietnam Cross of Gallantry, with Palm	1967–1969	For service in Vietnam
