= 12th Infantry Regiment (United States) =

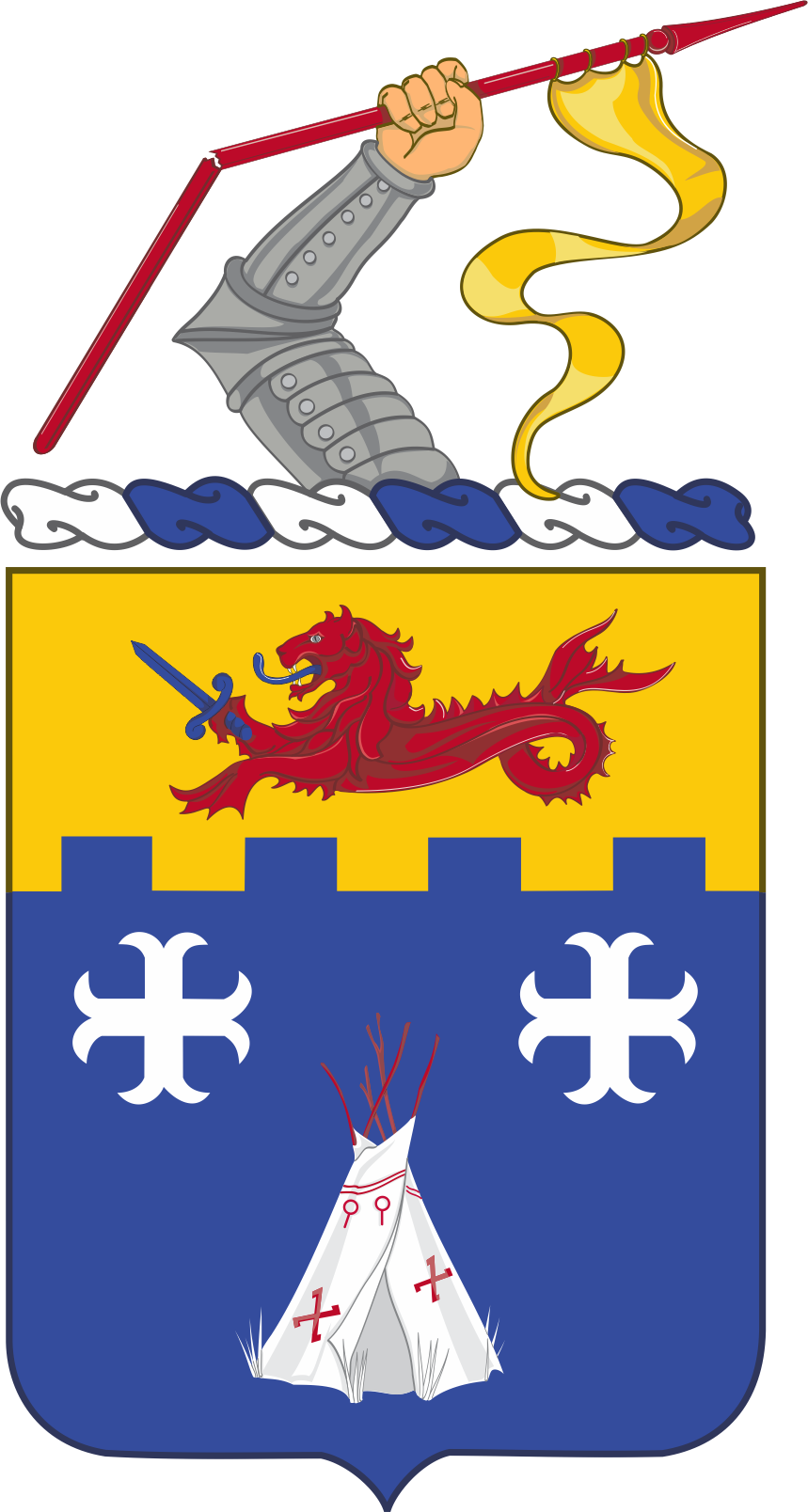
- Coat of arms
- Active: 1861–present
- Country: United States
- Branch: United States Army
- Type: Infantry
- Role: Stryker Infantry
- Part of: 2nd Stryker Brigade Combat Team “Mountain Warriors”, 4th Infantry Division
- Garrison/HQ: Fort Carson
- Nickname: "Red Warriors" (1st Bn) / "Lethal Warriors" (2nd Bn)
- Motto: Ducti Amore Patriae ("Having Been Led by Love of Country")
- Engagements: American Civil War; Indian Wars; Spanish–American War; Philippine Insurrection; World War II; Battle of Normandy; Battle of Hürtgen Forest; Vietnam War; Battle of Suoi Tre; Operation Iraqi Freedom; Operation Enduring Freedom; Operation Freedom’s Sentinel

Commanders
- Current commander: 1st Battalion: LTC Daniel Harrison; 2nd Battalion: LTC Kyle Brown
- Notable commanders: John Wilson Bubb

Insignia
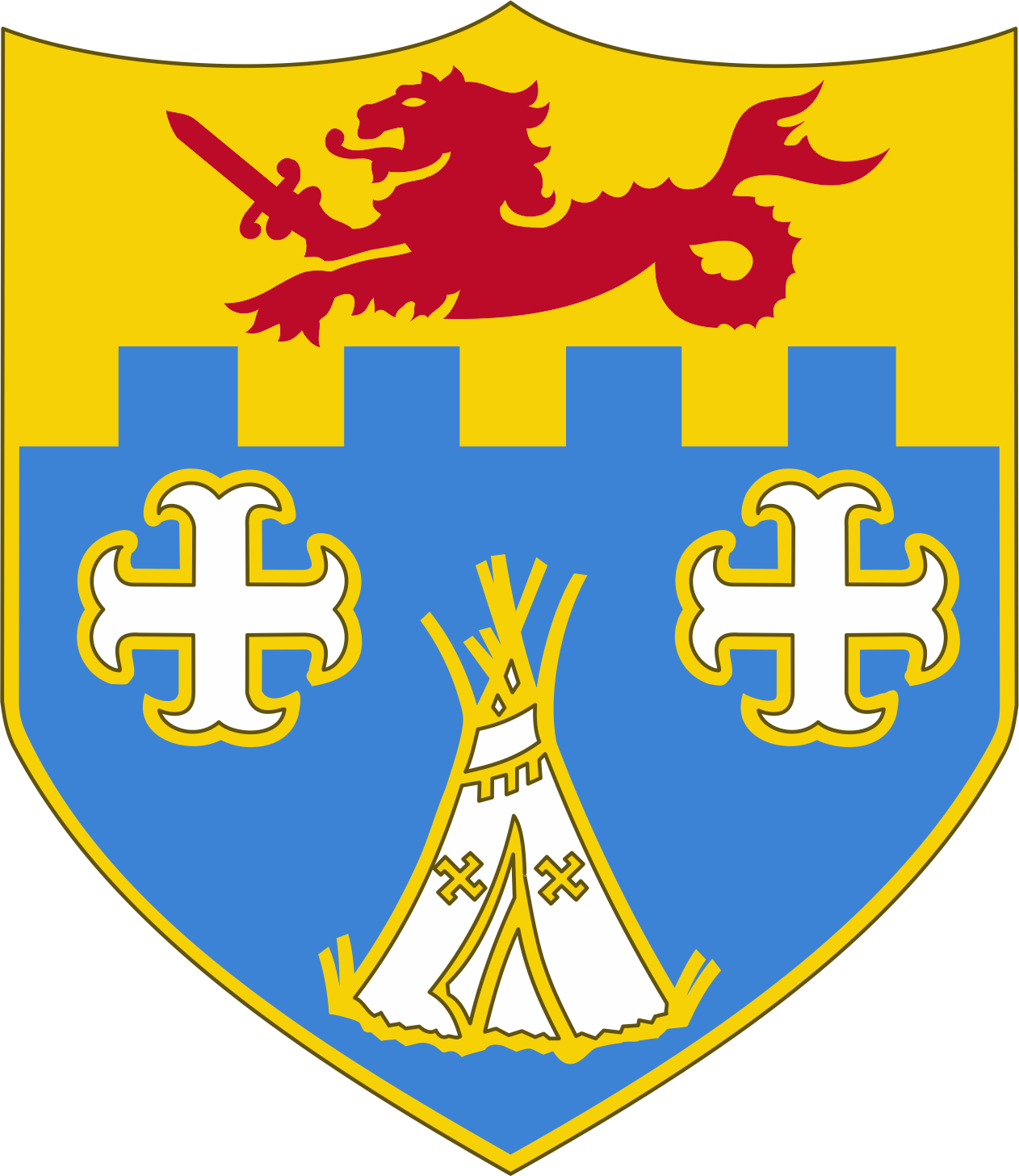
- Distinctive unit insignia

The 12th Infantry Regiment is a unit of the United States Army. The 12th Infantry has fought in seven wars from the Civil War to the War in Afghanistan (2001-2021) and has been awarded four Presidential Unit Citations, six Valorous Unit Awards, a Joint Meritorious Unit Award, two citations in the Order of the Day of the Belgian Army, three Republic of Vietnam Crosses of Gallantry, the Republic of Vietnam Civil Action Honor Medal First Class, eight Meritorious Unit Commendation, and the Belgian Fourragere. In 2021, both 1st Battalion and 2nd Battalion, 12th Infantry Regiment reorganized as Stryker Battalions under 2nd Stryker Brigade Combat Team, 4th Infantry Division. From 2023 to 2024, both Battalions completed a rotation to the Republic of Korea as a part of 2nd SBCT, Korea Rotational Force 13.

== History ==
=== Civil War ===
Less than a month after the first shots of the Civil War were fired at Fort Sumter in South Carolina, the 12th Infantry Regiment was constituted 3 May 1861 in the Regular Army as the 1st Battalion, 12th Infantry. It was organized 20 October 1861 at Fort Hamilton in New York. The battalion saw extensive combat during the Civil War, participating in twelve campaigns with the Army of the Potomac.

During the Peninsula Campaign, the 12th Infantry distinguished itself in its first combat action at the Battle of Gaines' Mill in June 1862, while sustaining fifty percent casualties. The regiment also participated in such historic battles as Antietam, Fredericksburg, Chancellorsville, Gettysburg and six additional campaigns culminating with the Siege of Petersburg, Virginia, from late summer 1864 through April 1865 and the war's end.

During the war it suffered a total of 319 fatalities; 8 officers and 118 enlisted men killed or mortally wounded, and another 3 officers and 190 enlisted men who died from accident or disease.

=== Indian Wars ===
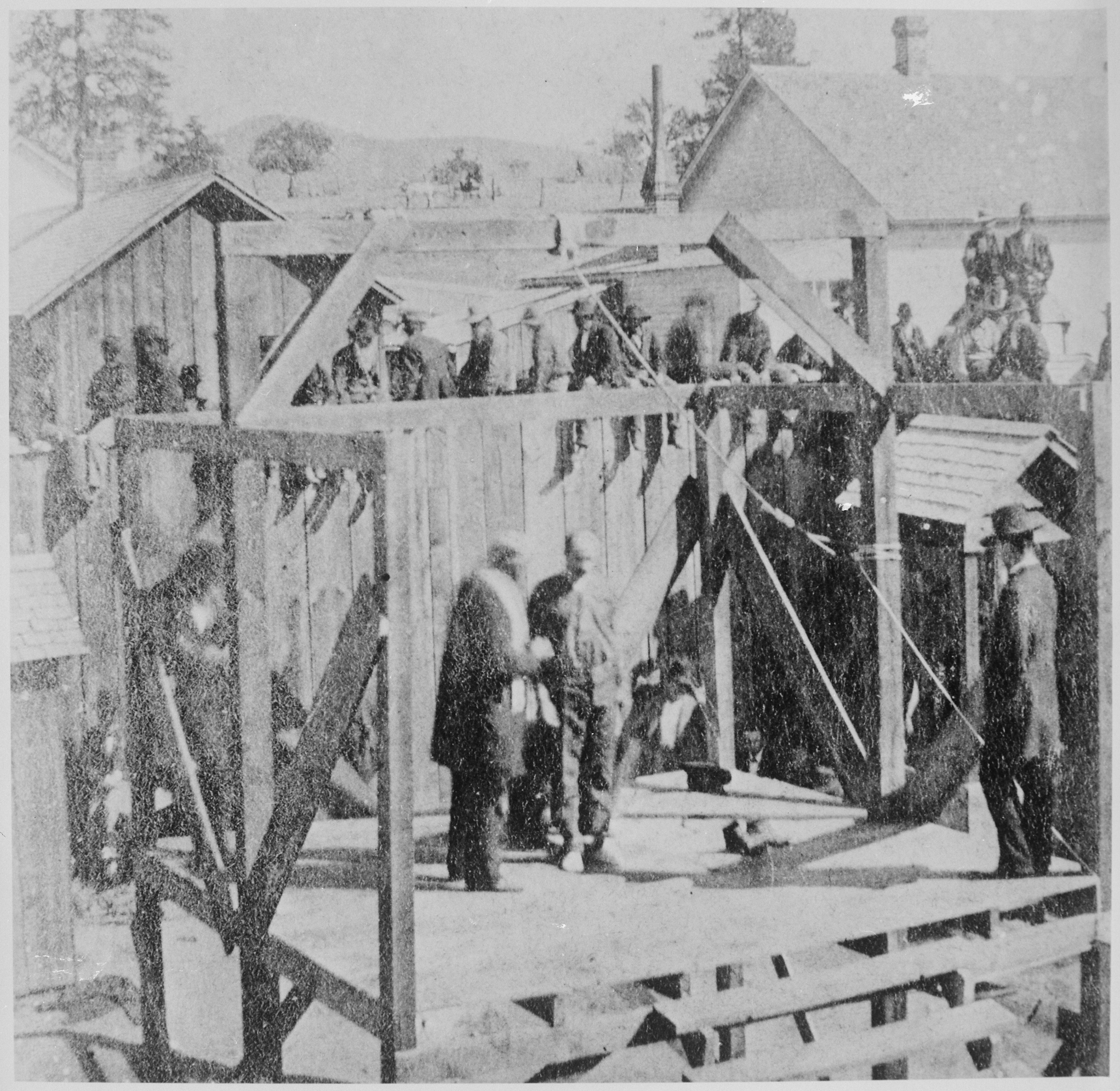
"Execution of a soldier of the 8th Infantry in Prescott, Arizona 1877" is the caption. In fact, it is the execution of Private James Malone of Company K 12th US Infantry in Prescott Arizona 15 March 1878 for his part in a January 1876 murder

The battalion was reorganized and redesignated as the 12th Infantry Regiment on 7 December 1866. In April 1869, having been ordered to the Presidio of San Francisco, California, the regiment entrained at Omaha, Nebraska, on the Union Pacific Railroad portion of the not yet finished transcontinental railroad; rode to Corinne, Utah; detrained and marched to the Central Pacific railhead; and re-entrained to complete the journey to Sacramento, California. In the 1870s, the regiment took part in three campaigns of the Indian Wars; against the Modoc tribe in California during 1872–1873, against the Bannocks in the Northwest in 1878, and against the Sioux at Pine Ridge, South Dakota from 1890 to 1891. During these campaigns, six soldiers performed acts deemed worthy of the Medal of Honor.

=== Spanish–American War and Philippine–American War ===
During the Spanish–American War, the 12th Infantry was sent to Cuba, in June 1898, and participated in the storming of the Spanish fortress in the Battle of El Caney, where the 12th had the distinction of capturing the Spanish colors.

At the conclusion of the War with Spain, the regiment was immediately deployed in February 1899 to the Philippine Islands to reinforce other Army units fighting elements of the Filipino Army that resisted the United States after they defeated the Spanish at the Battle of Manila. There, the regiment participated in three campaigns (Malolos, Tarlac, and Luzon 1899) of what was to be known as the Philippine–American War and then served as garrison troops, not returning to the United States until 1912.

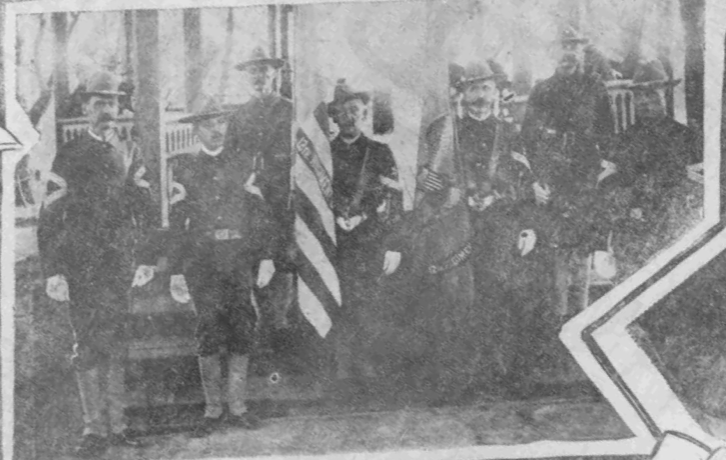
Regimental colors from 1902

=== Garrison duty ===
Deployed along the Mexican border, the regiment repulsed Villista harassing attacks during the Battle of Nogales in 1915. On 17 December 1917 the 12th Infantry was assigned to the 8th Division at Camp Fremont, California, but was not sent overseas in World War I. In August 1918 most of the regiment volunteered for duty in Siberia and the regiment was skeletonized until replacements were received and trained. As part of the 15th Infantry Brigade, the regiment moved to its pre-embarkation staging location at Camp Mills, New York, between 23 October and 31 October 1918, but entrained while quarantined at Camp Fremont for Spanish influenza. After its arrival, the regiment remained in strict quarantine until after its convoy had sailed, and was not released until 11 November, the day the armistice ended the war.

=== Interwar period ===
The 12th Infantry was stationed at Camp George G. Meade, Maryland, as of June 1919 as a separate regiment. The 2nd Battalion was transferred in January 1921 to Camp Lee, Virginia. The regiment was designated as a training center regiment on 27 July 1921 and assigned to the Third Corps Area Training Center. The 2nd Battalion was inactivated on 12 October 1921 at Camp George G. Meade. The 3rd Battalion was transferred in June 1922 to Fort Washington, Maryland. The regiment was reorganized as a combat regiment on 11 September 1922 upon the inactivation of the Third Corps Area Training Center. The regiment, less the 3rd Battalion, was transferred on 30 September 1922 to Fort Howard, Maryland. The regiment was assigned to the 8th Division on 24 March 1923. The 2nd Battalion was organized 30 March 1926 with Organized Reserve personnel as a Regular Army Inactive (RAI) unit with headquarters at Fort Howard. The regiment temporarily transferred on 7 May 1926 to Camp Anthony Wayne, Pennsylvania, and participated in the Sesquicentennial Exposition in Philadelphia until 11 December 1926. It was relieved from the 8th Division on 15 August 1927 and assigned to the 4th Division. It participated in the inaugural parades of President Herbert Hoover on 4 March 1929 and President Franklin D. Roosevelt on 4 March 1933. In 1932, the unit, along with the 3rd Cavalry regiment (led by then Major George S. Patton), engaged in the forced removal of WWI veterans who had camped in protest for the bonuses they were promised for their World War I service. The overall commander was Douglas MacArthur who declared the peaceful assembly an, "Attempt to overthrow the government." He sent Patton and Dwight Eisenhower's units in and the resulting chaos injured dozens and left at least one person dead. 3rd Battalion established the first Civilian Conservation Corps (CCC) camp in the United States near Edinburg, Virginia, on 17 April 1933. The regiment was relieved from the 4th Division on 1 October 1933 and reassigned to the 8th Division. From 1934 to 1935, Laurence Halstead commanded the regiment and the post at Fort Howard, Maryland. Assigned Reserve officers conducted summer training with the regiment at Fort Howard. The primary ROTC "feeder" school for new Reserve lieutenants for the regiment was Pennsylvania State College. The 3rd Battalion was transferred on 27 June 1939 to Arlington Cantonment, Virginia. The regiment, less the 3rd Battalion, was transferred on 3 September 1940 to Arlington Cantonment. The entire regiment was transferred on 12 June 1941 to Fort Dix, New Jersey. It was relieved from the 8th Division on 10 October and assigned to the 4th Division, and transferred on 24 October to Fort Benning, Georgia.

=== World War II ===
The 12th Infantry Regiment was reorganized as a motorized infantry regiment on 29 September 1942. Less than a year later, on 1 August 1943, the 12th was reorganized as a standard infantry regiment when the 4th Division was converted from motorized back to dismounted infantry. The regiment along with the rest of the 4th Infantry Division arrived in England on 29 January 1944. On D-Day, 6 June 1944, the 12th Infantry saw its first action of the war when, as part of the 4th Infantry Division, it spearheaded the assault landing on Utah Beach under the command of Colonel Russell "Red" Reeder. Between 9 and 12 August 1944, the regiment helped defeat the Germans in Operation Lüttich. The regiment fought in five European campaigns through France, Belgium, Luxembourg and Germany. The 12th Infantry was awarded the Presidential Unit Citation for valor in action at Luxembourg during the Battle of the Bulge. The regiment was also awarded the Belgian Fourragere. After Germany's surrender, the 12th Infantry, along with the 4th Infantry Division, returned to the United States on 12 July 1945 and was inactivated 27 February 1946 at Camp Butner, North Carolina. During this time famed author J. D. Salinger served with the unit.

=== Cold War ===
On 15 July 1947, the 12th Infantry Regiment was reactivated as a training regiment when 4th Infantry Division was given the mission of basic training at Fort Ord, California. In July 1951, the 4th Division was returned to line status and rotated to Germany as part of Operation Gyroscope. In 1956, the Division returned to the United States and was stationed at Fort Lewis (Washington).

In 1957, the Army decided that in the era of battlefield atomic weapons, tactical infantry regiments were obsolete. To preserve the historic infantry regiments the Army set up the Combat Arms Regimental System (CARS) whereby the line companies of a regiment would form new elements of the regiment. The 12th Infantry was selected as one of the historic regiments to be preserved. On 1 August 1957, Company A was redesignated and activated as Headquarters Company, 1st Battle Group, 12th Infantry (with organic companies of the battle group constituted and activated) and assigned to the 4th Infantry Division. Company B formed the 2nd Battle Group, 12th Infantry assigned in Germany to the 8th Infantry Division until 1959 when it was reassigned to the 1st Infantry Division also in Germany. Company C was allocated to the Army Reserves and formed the 3rd Battle Group, 12th Infantry assigned to the 79th Infantry Division.

By the time the Berlin Wall went up in August 1961, the 2nd Battle Group, 12th Infantry along with the rest of the 1st Infantry Division had been transferred back to Fort Riley, Kansas. To reinforce NATO, the 1st Division was directed to begin Operation Long Trust whereby the individual battle groups were rotated on temporary duty to West Germany. In July 1962, the 2nd Battle Group, 12th Infantry was airlifted to West Germany where it undertook several months of tactical training and testing at Wildflecken, West Germany. It was then ordered to proceed to Berlin overland through East Germany using the Helmstedt-Berlin autobahn to test the Warsaw Pact's willingness to allow NATO forces to continue to use it. Arriving without incident in Berlin to reinforce the U.S. Army's Berlin Brigade, the 2nd Battle Group was quartered at Andrews and McNair Barracks. Because of the ongoing Cuban Missile Crisis, the battle group was almost on constant alert in October 1962.

In 1963, the Army concluded that the battle group was not the answer and reorganized the infantry and airborne divisions into a quasi-regimental structure of three brigades of three infantry battalions each. Consequently, on 1 October 1963, the 2nd Battle Group, 12th Infantry was reorganized and redesignated as the 2nd Battalion, 12th Infantry and reassigned to the 4th Infantry Division at [Fort Lewis], Washington and eventually joined the 1st and 3rd Battalions of the 12th Infantry at Fort Carson, Colorado.

=== Vietnam ===
Three 12th Infantry battalions deployed to South Vietnam with the 4th Division from August through October 1966. The 3rd Brigade, 4th Division, to which the 2nd Battalion, 12th Infantry was assigned, set up base camp at Dầu Tiếng in III Corps while the rest of the 4th Division was assigned to the Central Highlands in II Corps alongside the 3rd Brigade of the 25th Division which had arrived in December 1965. On 1 August 1967, the two divisions swapped 3rd Brigades. Subsequently, the 2nd Battalion, 12th Infantry served with the 25th through 10 of the Battalion's 11 Vietnam campaigns and received the Presidential Unit Citation for gallantry in action at the Battle of Suoi Tre. As part of the U.S. draw-down, the 2nd Battalion, 12th Infantry was returned to Fort Lewis, WA, and inactivated on 17 April 1971.

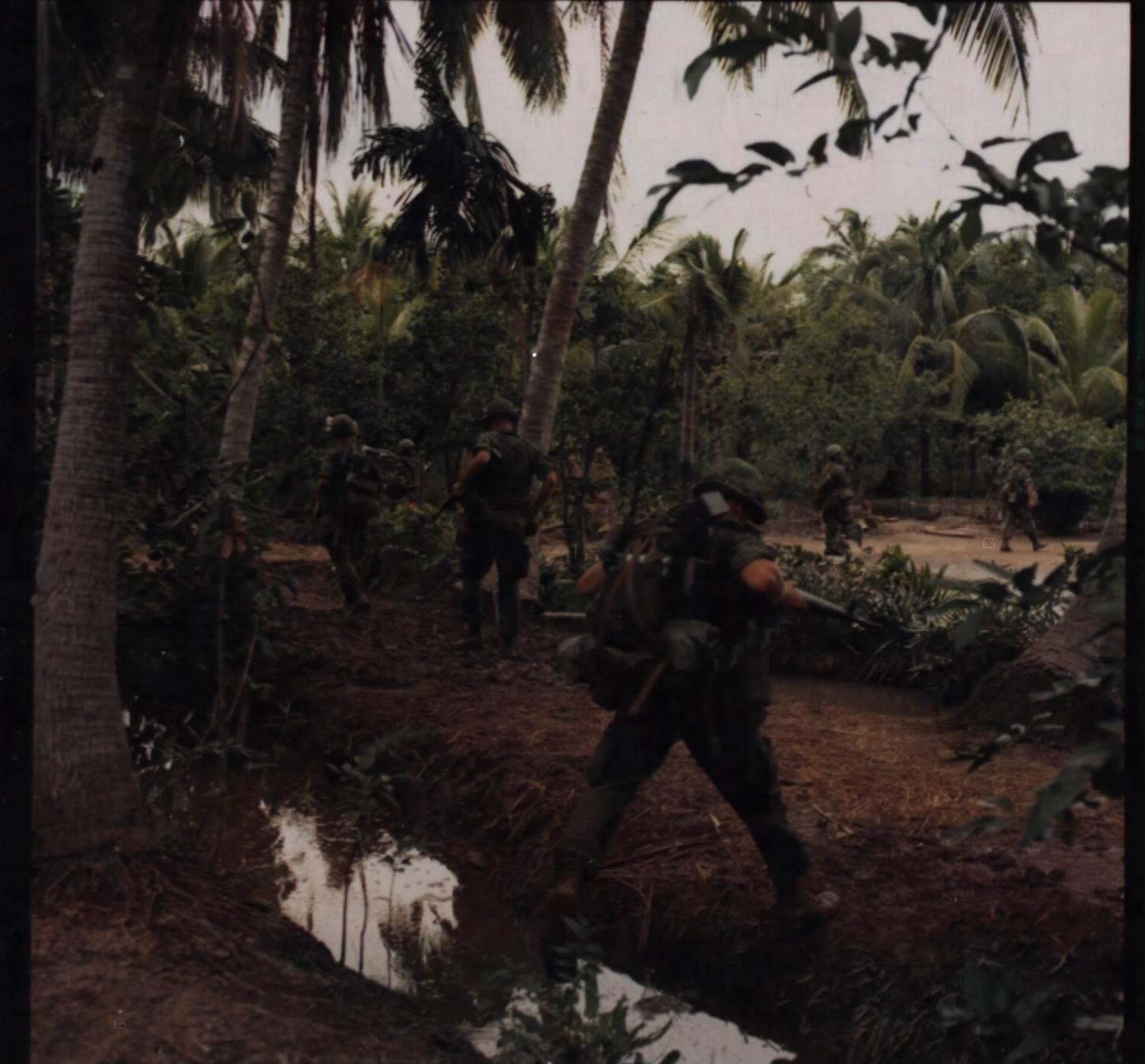
Men of Company "D", 4th Battalion, 12th Infantry cross a stream during Operation Toan Thang II, 2 October 1968

The 4th Battalion, 12th Infantry was activated and assigned to the 199th Light Infantry Brigade in June 1966 and went with the Brigade to Vietnam in December, 1966, where it was based at Long Binh near Saigon. In November 1967, the 5th Battalion, 12th Infantry was activated at Fort Lewis, WA and sent to Vietnam to join the 199th Brigade. This made the 12th Infantry unique in that the regiment had more battalions deployed in Vietnam than any other infantry regiment. In October 1970, the 4th and 5th Battalions returned to Fort Benning, Georgia and were inactivated. The 1st and 3rd Battalions returned in December 1970 with the 4th Division to Fort Carson, CO. Three soldiers from the 1st Battalion, one from the 2nd Battalion, two soldiers from the 4th Battalion, and one soldier from the 5th Battalion, were awarded the Medal of Honor.

=== Post-Vietnam ===
The CARS system was replaced by the US Army Regimental System in 1985 when the army contemplated shifting to a unit replacement system. Under the new system four battalions of the 12th Infantry were activated. The 1st and 2nd Battalions were assigned to the 4th Infantry Division at Fort Carson and the 3rd and 4th Battalions were assigned to the 8th Infantry Division in Germany. The concept was for members of the regiment to spend the majority of their army careers rotating between assignments with regimental battalions at Fort Carson and in Germany.

By the early 1990s, the Army draw-down and its expanding worldwide peace-keeping commitments led to a decision to scrap the unit replacement concept before it was fully implemented. The 3rd and 4th Battalions were transferred to the 1st Armored Division and served in Bosnia before being inactivated in Germany in 1997.

=== Operation Sea Signal ===
The 1st Battalion, 12th Infantry Regiment "Warriors" of the 4th Infantry Division deployed from 29 August 1994 – 25 February 1995 to Guantanamo Bay, Cuba in support of Joint Task Force 160 to provide refugee camp security at Camp Alpha, Camp Bravo, Camp Golf, Camp Mike, Camp Quebec, Camp Romeo, Camp Sierra, and Camp X-Ray. The unit also served as a quick reaction force to quell any refugee uprisings, built refugee housing camp facilities, escorting refugees for medical treatment, repatriation of Haitian refugees, distribution of food and supplies, and main base security. The battalion was housed in a tent city located on the football field of the base high school with the exception of Charlie Company who was housed in tents in the nursery. Awards for participation in Joint Task Force 160 include the Humanitarian Service Medal, and the Joint Meritorious Unit Award. The 1st Battalion was inactivated at Fort Carson in September 1995, after returning from deployment to Guantanamo Bay as a part of Operation Sea Signal. The 2d Battalion was then reflagged as the 1st Battalion in 1996 after having soldiers from the inactivated 1st Battalion added to the ranks.

=== Operation Iraqi Freedom ===
The 1st Battalion, 12th Infantry Regiment was formerly assigned to the 3d Brigade Combat Team of the U.S. 4th Infantry Division at Fort Carson and deployed with the 3rd BCT in March 2003 in support of Operation Iraqi Freedom I. From May 2003 to February 2004, the battalion and elements of 1-68 Armor and 4th Engineers was attached to 173rd Airborne Infantry Brigade while B/1-12 remained with 1-68 Armor under 3rd Brigade/4th Infantry Division. The battalion redeployed back to Fort Carson in March 2004. As a result of the transformation of the brigade to the modular concept, elements of the battalion were changed to a cavalry squadron, the 2nd Squadron, 9th Cavalry Regiment in November 2004. 1st Battalion, 12th Infantry Regiment was reactivated at Fort Hood as part of the 4th BCT, 4th Infantry Division and deployed to Baghdad, Iraq, in fall of 2005 in support of Operation Iraqi Freedom. It was replaced in the fall of 2006 by the 2nd BCT, 2nd Infantry Division from Fort Carson. This unit was temporarily assigned to 1st Cavalry Division to which the 2d Battalion, 12th Infantry Regiment was attached until February 2007 when the 4th BCT, 1st Infantry Division was assigned tactical control of Baghdad. On 6 April 2015 the 1st and 2nd Battalions, 12th Infantry Regiment were re-flagged under the 2nd IBCT, 4th Infantry Division, Fort Carson, Colorado.

=== Operation Enduring Freedom ===
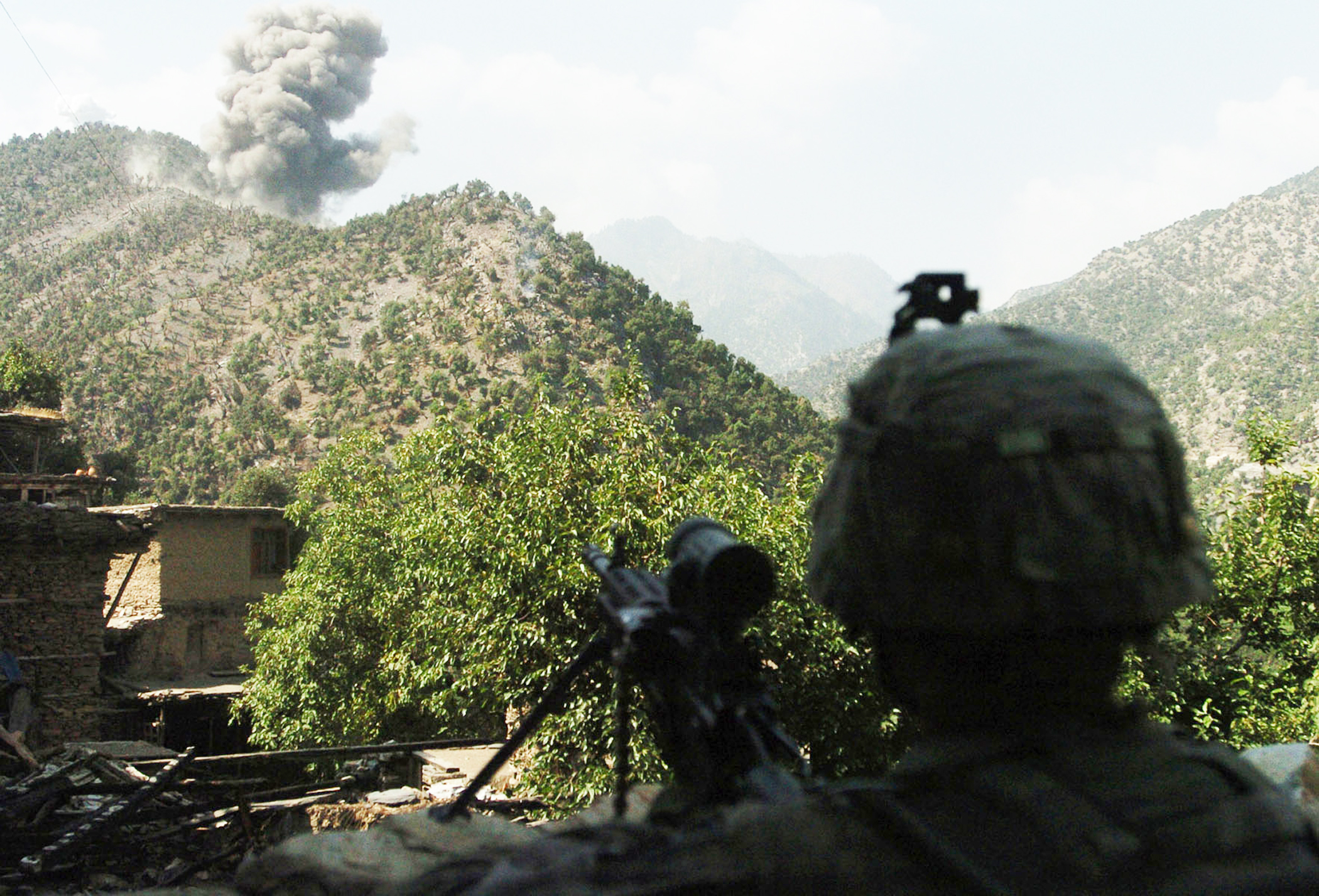
A U.S. Army Soldier assigned to Company B, 12th Infantry Regiment watches as Air Force F-15E Strike Eagles bomb insurgent positions after a 20-minute gun battle in the Korengal Valley on 13 August 2009.

In December 2001, Companies B and C of the 1st Battalion deployed to Kuwait in support of Intrinsic Action 01-02 and later in support of Operation Enduring Freedom. Elements of other units from within the 3d BCT, 4th Infantry Division made up the remainder of Task Force 1–12. The task force redeployed to Fort Carson in May 2002.

In May 2009, 1st and 2nd Battalions, 12th Infantry Regiment, 4BCT, 4th Infantry Division, deployed to Afghanistan in support of Operation Enduring Freedom X. 1st Battalion was based in the Arghandab River Valley, west of Kandahar City, for the latter eight months of the deployment. Task Force 1-12's area of responsibility was referred to as the "Heart of Darkness" due to its significance as the birthplace of the Taliban, and also due to the inherent complexity of their mission. Much of their fighting was conducted in notoriously dense grape fields, which provided excellent concealment for insurgent forces. The 2nd Battalion was based in the Pech River Valley, Kunar Province, home to the Korengal, Waygal, Shuriak, and Wata Pour Valleys. During its time in the Pech Valley, the 2nd Battalion saw heavy fighting throughout their area of responsibility at the foothills of the Hindu Kush mountains. In June 2010, Task Force 1-12 and Lethal Warrior (2–12), 4th BCT, 4 ID redeployed to Fort Carson, Colorado, after 12 months in Afghanistan.

In March 2012, 1st and 2nd Battalions, 12th Infantry Regiment, 4BCT, 4 ID, again deployed to Afghanistan in support of Operation Enduring Freedom. This time, both battalions were based out of Regional Command East. Both battalions returned by December 2012, after nine months in Afghanistan.

It was deployed to Afghanistan in February 2014 to assist in efforts to withdraw troops and equipment. The elements of the unit began to return to Ft Carson in September with the last unit arriving in December 2014.

== Lineage ==
Lineage of the 12th Infantry Regiment:

- Constituted 3 May 1861 in the Regular Army as the 1st Battalion, 12th Infantry
- Organized 20 October 1861 at Fort Hamilton, New York
- Reorganized and redesignated 7 December 1866 as the 12th Infantry
- Abandoned (closed) Fort Abraham Lincoln, North Dakota; assigned to Fort Yates, North Dakota, July 1891, Company F
- Abandoned (closed) Fort Bennett, South Dakota; assigned to Fort Yates, North Dakota, October 1891, Company A
- Assigned 17 December 1917 to the 8th Division
- Relieved 15 August 1927 from assignment to the 8th Division and assigned to the 4th Division
- Relieved 1 October 1933 from assignment to the 4th Division and assigned to the 8th Division
- Relieved 10 October 1941 from assignment to the 8th Division and assigned to the 4th Division (later redesignated as the 4th Infantry Division)
- Inactivated 27 February 1946 at Camp Butner, North Carolina
- Activated 15 July 1947 at Fort Ord, California
- Relieved 1 April 1957 from assignment to the 4th Infantry Division and reorganized as a parent regiment under the Combat Arms Regimental System (CARS)
- Withdrawn 16 June 1989 from the CARS and reorganized under the United States Army Regimental System
- Reflagged 16 April 2015 from 4th IBCT to 2nd IBCT, "War Horse" Brigade - 4th IBCT "Warriors" colors were cased and inactivated as part of the U.S. Army's downsizing efforts. 4th Infantry Division at Fort Carson, Colorado

== Honors ==
=== Campaign participation credit ===
- Civil War:
1. Peninsula Manassas
2. Antietam
3. Fredericksburg
4. Chancellorsville
5. Gettysburg
6. Wilderness
7. Spotsylvania
8. Cold Harbor
9. Petersburg
10. Virginia 1862
11. Virginia 1863
- Indian Wars:
1. Modocs
2. Bannocks
3. Pine Ridge
- Spanish–American War:
1. Santiago
- Philippine–American War:
1. Malolos
2. Tarlac
3. Luzon 1899
- World War II:
1. Normandy (with arrowhead)
2. Northern France
3. Rhineland
4. Ardennes-Alsace
5. Central Europe
- Vietnam:
1. Counteroffensive, Phase II
2. Counteroffensive, Phase III
3. Tet Counteroffensive
4. Counteroffensive, Phase IV
5. Counteroffensive, Phase V
6. Counteroffensive, Phase VI
7. Tet 69/Counteroffensive
8. Summer-Fall 1969
9. Winter-Spring 1970
10. Sanctuary Counteroffensive
11. Counteroffensive, Phase VII
- War on Terrorism:
1. Iraq - National Resolution - Operation Iraqi Freedom
2. Iraq - Iraqi Surge - Operation Iraqi Freedom
3. Afghanistan - Consolidation II - Operation Enduring Freedom
4. Afghanistan - Consolidation III - Operation Freedom's Sentinel

=== Decorations ===
1. Presidential Unit Citation (Army) for LUXEMBOURG (12th Infantry)
2. Presidential Unit Citation (Army) for SUOI TRE, VIETNAM (2nd Battalion)
3. Presidential Unit Citation (Army) for PLEIKU PROVINCE, VIETNAM (3rd Battalion)
4. Presidential Unit Citation (Army) for DAK TO DISTRICT, VIETNAM (3rd Battalion)
5. Valorous Unit Award for PLEIKU PROVINCE, VIETNAM (1st Battalion)
6. Valorous Unit Award for CENTRAL HIGHLANDS, VIETNAM (1st Battalion)
7. Valorous Unit Award for SAIGON – LONG BINH, VIETNAM (4th Battalion)
8. Valorous Unit Award for FISH HOOK, VIETNAM (5th Battalion)
9. Valorous Unit Award for IRAQ 2003-2004 (1st Battalion)
10. Valorous Unit Award for IRAQ KUNAR PROVINCE, AFGHANISTAN 2009 (2nd Battalion)
11. Meritorious Unit Commendation for IRAQ 2003 (1st Battalion)
12. Meritorious Unit Commendation for IRAQ 2005-2006 (1st Battalion)
13. Meritorious Unit Commendation for IRAQ 2006-2008 (2nd Battalion)
14. Meritorious Unit Commendation for AFGHANISTAN 2009-2010 (1st & 2nd Battalion)
15. Meritorious Unit Commendation for AFGHANISTAN 2012 (1st & 2nd Battalion)
16. Meritorious Unit Commendation for AFGHANISTAN 2014 (1st & 2nd Battalion)
17. Meritorious Unit Commendation for AFGHANISTAN 2016 (1st Battalion)
18. Meritorious Unit Commendation for AFGHANISTAN 2018 (1st & 2nd Battalion)
19. Joint Meritorious Unit Award for Operation Sea Signal (JTF-160) in Guantanamo Bay, Cuba
20. Belgian Fourragere 1940
21. Cited in the Order of the Day of the Belgian Army for action in BELGIUM (12th Infantry)
22. Cited in the Order of the Day of the Belgian Army for action in the ARDENNES (12th Infantry)
23. Republic of Vietnam Cross of Gallantry with Palm, Streamer embroidered VIETNAM 1966–1967
24. Republic of Vietnam Cross of Gallantry with Palm, Streamer embroidered VIETNAM 1967–1968
25. Republic of Vietnam Cross of Gallantry with Palm, Streamer embroidered VIETNAM 1968–1970
26. Republic of Vietnam Civil Action Honor Medal, First Class, Streamer embroidered VIETNAM 1967–1970
27. Presidential Unit Citation (Army) FOR Iraq 2003-2004 (Not confirmed by DOA, Lineage and Honors as of 2/3/2019)

== Legacy ==
Several photographers and journalists were embedded with the 1st Battalion 12th Infantry Regiment during their 2009–2010 tour to Kandahar. A series of articles published by David Philipps in the Colorado Springs Gazette chronicles the 2nd Battalion of the 12th Infantry Regiment. The series inspired the book Lethal Warriors - When the New Band of Brothers Came Home. which follows the lives of Lethal Warriors members after returning to the United States.

== See also ==
- List of United States Regular Army Civil War units
- Nicolae Dunca
- Henry Rathbone
