= Battle of Suoi Tre =

Part of the Vietnam War (1967)

- Part of Operation Junction City, Vietnam War
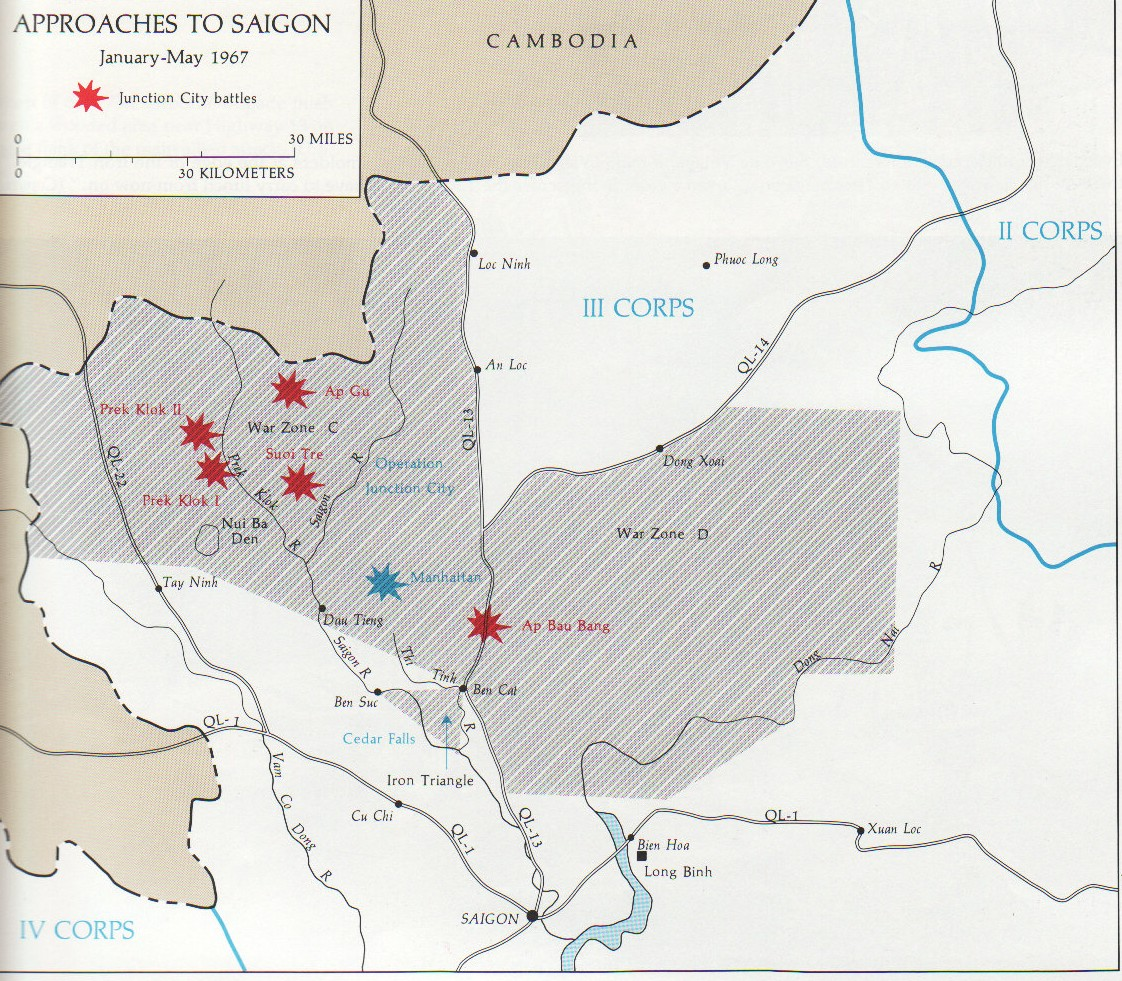
- Map of engagements during Operation Junction City
Date	21 March 1967
Location	11.493°N 106.266°E Suoi Tre, Tay Ninh Province, South Vietnam
Result	American victory

Belligerents
United States	Viet Cong

Commanders and leaders
James A. Grimsley	Unknown

Units involved
2nd Battalion, 12th Infantry Regiment; 3rd Battalion, 22nd Infantry Regiment; 2nd Battalion, 77th Artillery Regiment; 2nd Battalion, 34th Armor Regiment	272nd Regiment

Strength
	~1,500

Casualties and losses
36 killed 190 wounded	647 killed 7 captured 94 individual and 65 crew-served weapons recovered

The Battle of Suoi Tre (Vietnamese: suối Tre) occurred during the early morning of 21 March 1967 during Operation Junction City, a search and destroy mission by American military forces in Tay Ninh Province, South Vietnam. After being challenged heavily to begin with, the Americans gained the upper hand and completed a convincing victory over the Viet Cong (VC). They claimed to have found 647 bodies and captured seven prisoners, while recovering 65 crew-served and 94 individual weapons. The Americans losses were 36 dead and 190 wounded, a fatality ratio of more than twenty to one in their favour.

On 19 March, American helicopters dropped two infantry battalions off in a clearing near Suoi Tre to build a fire support base to be used in search and destroy missions against the VC. During the airlift, seven helicopters were damaged. On March 21, a VC attack started before dawn at 06:30, starting with a mortar attack followed by a large-scale infantry charge. The VC overwhelmed parts of the American perimeter at first, and forced them to withdraw inwards. After a period, American reinforcements broke through the VC envelope to assist their besieged colleagues, and firepower and artillery helped them gain the upper hand. The VC stubbornly fought on, with some carrying wounded compatriots forward in follow-up infantry charges, but they were eventually forced to withdraw with heavy casualties.

== Background ==
On 19 March, in an area surrounded by a tree line of sparse woodland that had been scarred by defoliants, American helicopters landed the 3rd Battalion, 22nd Infantry Regiment and the 2nd Battalion, 77th Artillery Regiment, led by Lieutenant Colonels John A. Bender and John William Vessey Jr., respectively, as part of the 3rd Brigade, 4th Infantry Division led by Colonel Marshall B. Garth. Their objective was to establish Fire Support Base (FSB) Gold, which would be used to support search and destroy missions of Operation Junction City. The Americans did not anticipate heavy action.

The landing area was an elliptical clearing close to Suoi Tre, near the center of War Zone C and 90 km northwest of Saigon. Only 3 km away, during Operation Attleboro a few months earlier, the Americans had defeated the VC at the Battle of Ap Cha Do. The 272nd Regiment of the 9th Division had been involved in that battle, and had recovered since then.

As the three sets of helicopters landed, five heavy remote-controlled charges were set off by the VC in the landing clearing. Three helicopters were destroyed and six more damaged, resulting in 15 killed and 28 wounded. A VC claymore-type mine was also detonated against Company C, 3/22nd Infantry, wounding five infantrymen.

Company B, 3/22nd Infantry, was assigned the east portion of the defensive perimeter, Company A the western half. Later that day the 2nd Battalion, 12th Infantry Regiment landed at Fire Support Base Gold and moved to the northwest. Its final airlift attracted VC fire, and another seven helicopters were damaged.

On 20 March work was done to improve the FSB's perimeter defenses.

== Battle ==
At 04:30 on 21 March, a night patrol from Company B which was operating outside the perimeter reported movement near its ambush site. However no further movement was detected for two hours. At 06:30 the patrol prepared to return to camp. One minute later, explosions were set off in the area as the US base came under heavy attack from enemy 60 mm and 82 mm mortars. Simultaneously, the patrol was attacked by a VC force. Within five minutes, the patrol had been overpowered and all of its men were killed or wounded.

The first VC mortar round landed outside a company command post; seconds later another exploded outside battalion headquarters. An estimated 650 mortar rounds fell while the VC advanced towards the perimeter. As they moved closer, machine guns and recoilless rifles joined the attack as the VC prepared to assault the position.

Minutes later, the entire perimeter came under attack by waves of VC infantry emerging from the jungle and firing recoilless rifles, RPG-2 rockets, automatic weapons and small arms. The heaviest attacks were concentrated on the northeastern and southeastern portions of the base. As the VC attack intensified, the three US artillery batteries began to return mortar fire at their VC counterparts. During the first assault, Company B reported that its 1st Platoon positions on the south-eastern perimeter had been penetrated and that a reaction force from the 2/77th Artillery, was needed to reinforce them. Artillery was sent to the perimeter to help repulse the continuing attacks.

At 07:00 the first Forward Air Controller (FAC) arrived to direct airstrikes against the VC. At the same time, two batteries of 105 mm howitzers located at nearby fire support bases were brought within 100 m of the battalion's perimeter. At 07:11, Company B reported that its 1st Platoon had been overrun and faced by an infantry charge. Airstrikes were called in all along the wood line to the east to ease the pressure on the besieged company. Then the FAC directing these strikes was shot down by automatic weapons fire. At 07:50 the Company B commander requested that the artillery fire beehive rounds into the southeastern and southern sections of his perimeter. At 07:56 Company B reported that the VC had penetrated the 1st Platoon sector and ammunition was depleted there. Ammunition and 20 men from Company A were sent to assist B Company. At 08:13 the northeastern section of the perimeter was overrun by another infantry charge. At 08:15, elements of Company A which had established an ambush just outside the perimeter the previous night charged into the camp's perimeter and assumed defensive positions, managing to evade the surrounding VC.

Company A reported that the VC had penetrated the northern perimeter. Ten minutes later an M45 Quadmount machine gun located there was hit by RPG-2 rounds and overrun. As the attacking VC reached the weapon and attempted to turn it on the Americans, the gun was blown apart by a round from a 105 mm howitzer crew from their position 75 m away. By 08:40 the Americans on the northeastern, eastern and southeastern perimeter had withdrawn to a secondary defensive line around the artillery. The northern, western and southern defenders were managing to hold despite large numbers of VC who had come within 15 m from the defensive positions, and within hand grenade range of the battalion command post and only 5 m from the battalion aid station. The howitzers, now depressed to almost zero elevation, began firing beehive rounds into the VC at point-blank range. Each round had 8,000 finned steel missiles directed at their target.

Airstrikes were brought in within 50 m of their compatriots and supporting artillery pounded areas around the perimeter to stop the VC. When the artillerymen had exhausted their supply of beehive rounds, they began to fire high explosive rounds at point-blank range. By 09:00 the northern, western, and southern sectors of the perimeter were holding despite ongoing VC pressure. The positions on the east had withdrawn inwards, but were still intact.

The 3rd Brigade headquarters had already alerted its other units conducting operations to the west. They were the 2/12th Infantry, the 2/22nd Infantry (Mechanized), and the 2nd Battalion, 34th Armor Regiment. When word of the attack reached these forces, they returned immediately to base. The 2/12th Infantry moved from the northwest and the mechanized infantry and armor battalions moved from the southwest until they reached the stream, where they were held up while finding a feasible crossing site, of which there was only one.

At 09:00 the relief column from the 2/12th Infantry broke through the VC and linked up with the depleted Company B. With the replenished forces and firepower, the two units were able to counterattack to the east and reestablish the original perimeter. The VC continued attacking, using wounded soldiers who had been bandaged earlier in the same battle. The Americans reported that they were advancing, even though some could not walk and had to be carried into offensive positions by colleagues.

Twelve minutes after the first US relief unit arrived, the mechanized infantry and armor column broke through the jungle from the southwest to reinforce the American defenders. With their 90 mm guns firing canister rounds and machine guns raking the VC, they moved into the advancing VC, cutting them down and forcing them to withdraw. By 09:30 the base perimeter had been re-secured and thirty minutes later, helicopters had arrived to evacuate the wounded Americans. By 10:45 the battle was over, except for various armored cars and tanks that pursued the retreating VC, who were also targeted with artillery and air strikes. This continued until noon.

== Aftermath ==
The Americans claimed 647 Viet Cong killed, took seven prisoners and 65 crew-served and 94 individual weapons. Of the weapons captured, fifty were RPG-2 rocket launchers. The Americans lost 36 killed and 190 wounded.

Documents captured in the area showed that intensive planning had been made by the VC before the attack. The attacking force was identified by the Americans as the 272nd Regiment of the 9th Division, and elements of U-80 Artillery. The 272nd was considered by the Americans to be one of the best organized and equipped VC units and was one of the few that dared to make daylight attacks.

The following American units received the Presidential Unit Citation for extraordinary heroism at Suoi Tre, awarded on 21 October 1968:

- 2nd Battalion, 34th Armor Regiment
- 2nd Battalion & 3rd Battalion, 22nd Infantry Regiment
- 2nd Battalion, 77th Field Artillery

The commander of 2nd Battalion, 77th Field Artillery at the time, Lieutenant Colonel John William Vessey Jr., received the Distinguished Service Cross for his actions during the battle.
