= 77th Field Artillery Regiment =

US military unit

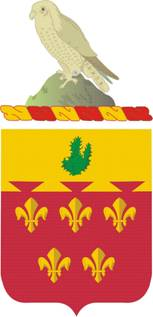
- Coat of arms
- Active: 1916
- Country: United States
- Branch: Army
- Type: Field artillery
- Motto: En Garde (On Guard)
- Engagements: World War I; World War II; Vietnam War; Operation Junction City; Battle of Suoi Tre; Global war on terrorism; Iraq War; War in Afghanistan
- Decorations: Presidential Unit Citation (2x); Valorous Unit Award (2x); Meritorious Unit Commendation (4x); Vietnam Gallantry Cross (3x); Civil Actions Medal

Commanders
- Notable commanders: Guy H. Preston; John William Vessey Jr. (2-77 FAR)

Insignia
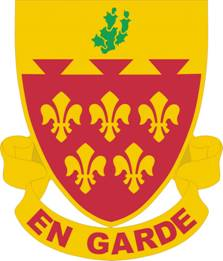
- Distinctive unit insignia

The 77th Field Artillery Regiment is a field artillery regiment of the United States Army. First constituted 1916 in the Regular Army as a cavalry regiment, it was reorganized in 1917 as field artillery and given its current designation.

Two battalions of the 77th are currently active; 1st Battalion is part of the 41st Field Artillery Brigade in Germany, while 2nd Battalion is part of the 4th Infantry Division Artillery in Fort Carson, Colorado.

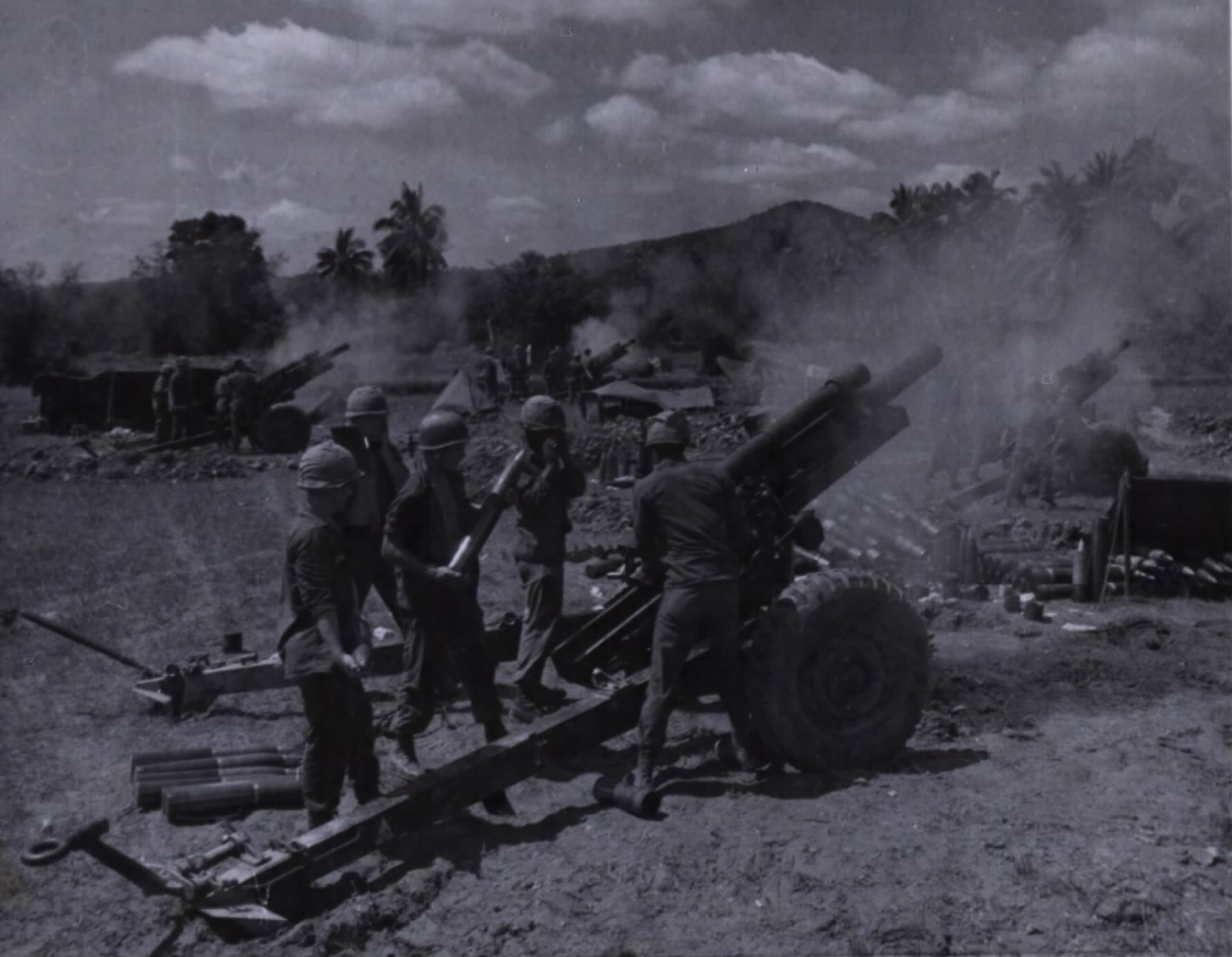
Gun crew of Battery "C", 77th Artillery fires against the Viet Cong in the Bong Son District during Operation White Wing, 19 February 1966

== History ==
Constituted 1 July 1916 in the Regular Army as the 19th Cavalry. The regiment was commanded by Colonel Guy H. Preston.

Organized 23 May-11 June 1917 at Fort Ethan Allen, Vermont.

Converted and redesignated 1 November 1917 as the 77th Field Artillery.

Assigned 19 November 1917 to the 4th Division.

Inactivated 21 September 1921 at Camp Lewis, Washington.

Relieved 24 March 1923 from assignment to the 4th Division and assigned to the 7th Division.

Relieved 1 January 1930 from assignment to the 7th Division and assigned to the 4th Division.

(1st Battalion activated 1 January 1935 at Fort Sill, Oklahoma).

Activated (less 1st Battalion) 1 November 1935 at Fort D. A. Russell, Texas.

Relieved 16 October 1939 from assignment to the 4th Division.

Regiment broken up 24 February 1944 and its elements reorganized and redesignated as follows: Headquarters and Headquarters Battery as Headquarters and Headquarters Battery, 77th Field Artillery Group; 1st and 2d Battalions as the 634th and 631st Field Artillery Battalions, respectively.

After 24 February 1944 the above units underwent changes as follows:

Headquarters and Headquarters Battery, 77th Field Artillery Group, inactivated 25 September 1945 in Italy Activated 27 August 1951 at Fort Sill, Oklahoma. Inactivated 25 September 1956 at Fort Sill, Oklahoma.

634th Field Artillery Battalion redesignated 15 May 1945 as the 77th Field Artillery Battalion Inactivated 4 January 1946 at Camp Kilmer, New Jersey.

Headquarters and Headquarters Battery, 77th Field Artillery Battalion, redesignated 1 August 1946 as the 77th Field Artillery Battery and activated at Fort Winfield Scott, California (organic elements of the 77th Field Artillery Battalion concurrently disbanded).

77th Field Artillery Battery inactivated 25 November 1946 at Fort Winfield Scott, California. Redesignated 19 March 1948 as the 77th Armored Field Artillery Battery. Redesignated 1 February 1949 as the 77th Field Artillery Battery and activated in Austria. Inactivated 31 July 1955 in Austria. Redesignated 20 December 1956 as Headquarters and Headquarters Battery, 634th Field Artillery Rocket Battalion (organic elements of former 77th Field Artillery Battalion concurrently reconstituted as elements of the 634th Field Artillery Rocket Battalion) Battalion activated 1 January 1957 at Fort Hood, Texas. Inactivated 26 June 1958 at Fort Hood, Texas

631st Field Artillery Battalion inactivated 8 September 1945 in Italy. Redesignated 4 November 1946 as the 85th Field Artillery Battalion. Assigned 1 July 1948 to the 10th Infantry Division and activated at Fort Riley, Kansas. Inactivated 1 July 1957 in Germany and relieved from assignment to the 10th Infantry Division

Headquarters and Headquarters Battery, 77th Field Artillery Group; 634th Field Artillery Rocket Battalion; and the 85th Field Artillery Battalion consolidated 27 June 1958 to form the 77th Artillery, a parent regiment under the Combat Arms Regimental System

Redesignated 1 September 1971 as the 77th Field Artillery.

Withdrawn 17 August 1986 from the Combat Arms Regimental System and reorganized under the United States Army Regimental System.

Redesignated 1 October 2005 as the 77th Field Artillery Regiment. Beginning in 2009, battalions from the 77th FA regiment deployed to Afghanistan with the 4th Brigade Combat Team, 4th Infantry Division. 2-77 FA has continued to deploy with the 4th Infantry Division every two years since 2009.

== 1st Battalion ==
As of 2024, 1-77 FAR is active in Germany with the 41st Field Artillery Brigade, an independent brigade assigned to V Corps.

== 2nd Battalion ==
The 2nd Battalion, 77th Field Artillery Regiment featured prominently in the American counterassault against the Vietcong at the Battle of Suoi Tre. The unit's heroism during the battle was recognized when it was awarded the Presidential Unit Citation on 21 October 1968.

The commander of 2nd Battalion, 77th Field Artillery at the time of Suoi Tre, Lieutenant Colonel John William Vessey Jr., received the Distinguished Service Cross for his actions during the battle.

As of 2025, 2-77 FAR is active as part of the 4th Infantry Division Artillery, assigned to Fort Carson, Colorado.

== 4th Battalion ==
Formerly assigned to the 41st Field Artillery Brigade, 4-77 FAR was deactivated in 1991.

== Distinctive unit insignia ==
- Description

A Gold color metal and enamel device 1 1/8 inches (2.9 cm) in height overall consisting of a shield blazoned as follows: Gules, five fleurs-de-lis, three and two, Or; on a chief dovetailed at the last a prickly pear cactus Proper; and attached below the shield a Gold scroll inscribed “EN GARDE” in Red.

- Symbolism

The shield is red for artillery. The yellow dovetailed chief symbolizes the formation of the organization from cavalry. The cactus indicates service as cavalry on the Mexican border. The five fleurs-de-lis signify the five major engagements in France in World War I as artillery.

- Background

The distinctive unit insignia was originally approved for the 77th Field Artillery Regiment on 10 December 1929. It was redesignated for the 634th Field Artillery Battalion on 28 July 1944. It was redesignated for the 77th Artillery Regiment on 16 December 1958. It was redesignated effective 1 September 1971, for the 77th Field Artillery Regiment. The insignia was amended to update and clarify the description and symbolism on 12 August 1985.

== Coat of arms ==
The 1-77th Field Artillery Regiment had their first live fire with M270 MLRS

- Blazon
  - Shield: Gules, five fleurs-de-lis, three and two, Or; on a chief dovetailed of the last a prickly pear cactus Proper.
  - Crest: On a wreath of the colors, Or and Gules, a mount Vert supporting a falcon Proper.
  - Motto: EN GARDE (On Guard).
- Symbolism
  - Shield: The shield is red for artillery. The yellow dovetailed chief symbolizes the formation of the organization from cavalry. The cactus indicates service as cavalry on the Mexican border. The five fleurs-de-lis signify the five major engagements in France in World War I as artillery.
  - Crest: The crest is taken from the arms of Montfaucon, as most of the 77th Field Artillery was there when the Armistice was signed.
- Background: The coat of arms was originally approved for the 77th Field Artillery Regiment on 10 December 1929. It was redesignated for the 634th Field Artillery Battalion on 28 July 1944. It was redesignated for the 77th Artillery Regiment on 16 December 1958. It was redesignated effective 1 September 1971, for the 77th Field Artillery Regiment. The insignia was amended to clarify the symbolism on 12 August 1985.

== Current configuration ==
- 1st Battalion, 77th Field Artillery Regiment- assigned to 41st Field Artillery Brigade
- 2nd Battalion, 77th Field Artillery Regiment- assigned to 4th Infantry Division Artillery at Fort Carson, Colorado
- 3rd Battalion, 77th Field Artillery Regiment,
- 5th Battalion, 77th Field Artillery Regiment,
- 6th Battalion, 77th Field Artillery Regiment,

== Campaign participation credit ==
- World War I: Aisne-Marne; St. Mihiel; Meuse-Argonne; Champagne 1918; Lorraine 1918
- World War II: Sicily (with arrowhead); Naples-Foggia; Anzio; Rome-Arno; Southern France (with arrowhead); North Apennines; Rhineland; Ardennes-Alsace; Central Europe; Po Valley
- Vietnam: Defense; Counteroffensive; Counteroffensive, Phase II; Counteroffensive, Phase III; Tet Counteroffensive; Counteroffensive, Phase IV; Counteroffensive, Phase V; Counteroffensive, Phase VI; Tet 69/Counteroffensive; Summer-Fall 1969; Winter-Spring 1970; Sanctuary Counteroffensive; Counteroffensive, Phase VII; Consolidation I; Consolidation II
- War on Terrorism: Global War on Terrorism; Iraq; Afghanistan

== Decorations ==
- Presidential Unit Citation (Army), Streamer embroidered PLEIKU PROVINCE
- Presidential Unit Citation (Army), Streamer embroidered SUOI TRE
- Valorous Unit Award, Streamer embroidered FISH HOOK
- Valorous Unit Award, Streamer embroidered VIETNAM 1971
- Vietnam Gallantry Cross with Palm, embroidered VIETNAM 1966-1967
- Vietnam Gallantry Cross with Palm, embroidered VIETNAM 1967-1968
- Republic of Vietnam Civil Actions Medal, First Class, streamer embroidered VIETNAM 1967-1970

== Notable members ==
- Guy H. Preston- Commanded the regiment in 1917–1918
- John William Vessey Jr.- Commanded 2nd Battalion, 77th Field Artillery at the Battle of Suoi Tre in 1967; later served as 10th Chairman of the Joint Chiefs of Staff (1982-1985)

== See also ==
- Field Artillery Branch (United States)
- U.S. Army Coast Artillery Corps
