= David P. Valcourt =

United States Army general

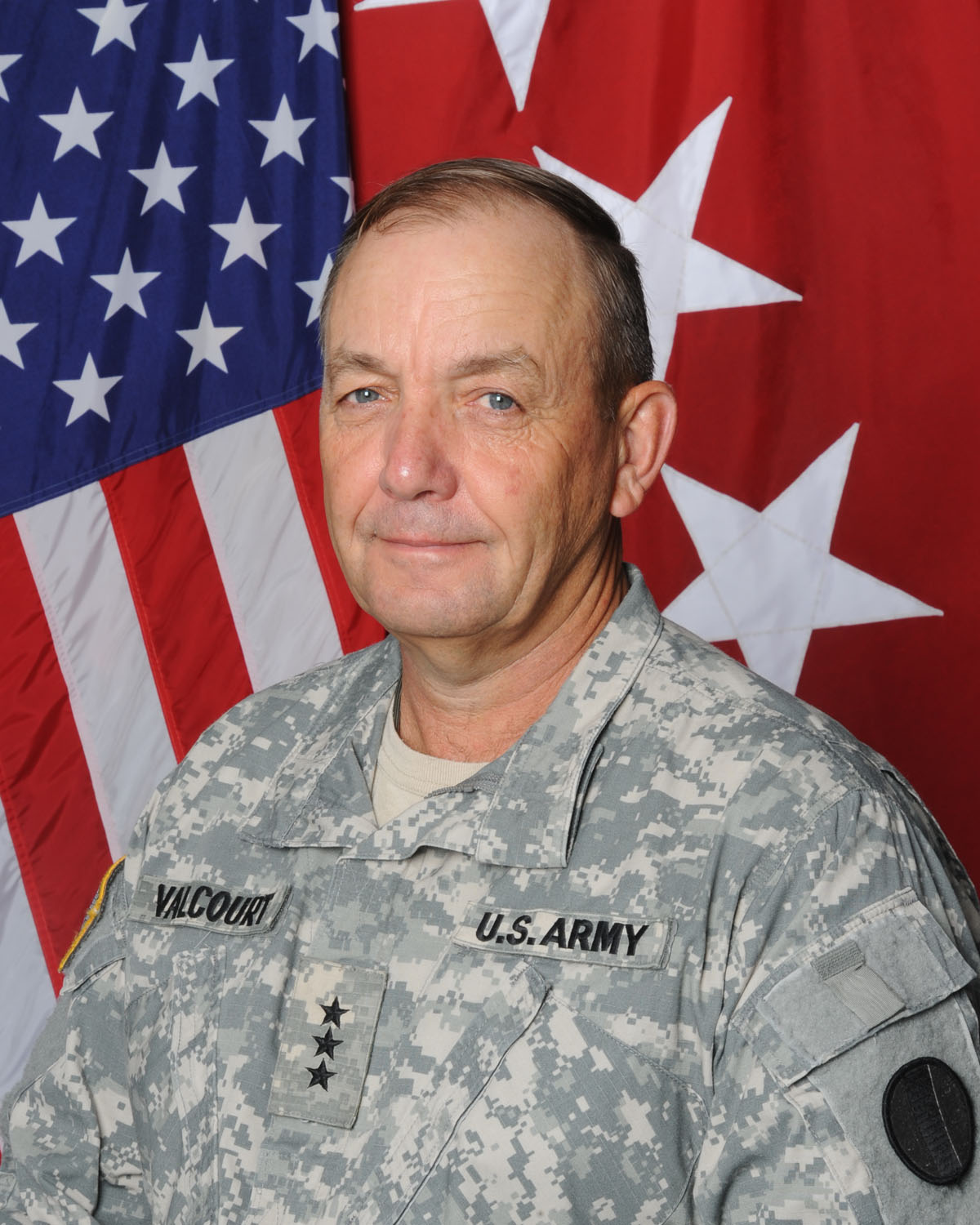
- Born: 1951 (age 74–75)
- Military career
- Allegiance: United States of America
- Branch: United States Army
- Service years: 1973–2010
- Rank: Lieutenant General

David Paul Valcourt is a retired lieutenant general of the United States Army. He served as the Deputy Commanding General and Chief of Staff, United States Army Training and Doctrine Command from February 25, 2008, to May 3, 2010, after serving as Commanding General, Eight United States Army. He was previously the Commanding General of the Field Artillery Center and Fort Sill, Oklahoma.

He was the Commanding General of the Eighth United States Army and the Chief of Staff of United States Forces Korea, Combined Forces Command, and the United Nations Command in the Republic of Korea.

Valcourt is a native of Chicopee Falls, Massachusetts, graduated from the United States Military Academy at West Point with a B.S. degree and was commissioned a Second Lieutenant in the Field Artillery (FA) on 6 June 1973. He later earned an M.S. degree in Physical Education from Springfield College in 1983 and an M.A. degree in National Security and Strategic Studies from the Naval War College. Valcourt has held a variety of command and staff positions.

He holds the Army Distinguished Service Medal, Defense Superior Service Medal, the Legion of Merit with 4 Oak Leaf Clusters, and the Defense Meritorious Service Medal, among other medals.

== Decorations ==
- Army Distinguished Service Medal
- Defense Superior Service Medal
- Legion of Merit with four oak leaf clusters
- Defense Meritorious Service Medal
- Meritorious Service Medal
- Army Commendation Medal
- Army Achievement Medal
- National Defense Service Medal with two stars
- Korea Defense Service Medal
- Humanitarian Service Medal
- Army Service Ribbon
- Overseas Service Ribbon
