= 3rd Battalion, 33rd Armor Regiment =

3rd Battalion, 33rd Armored Regiment, 3rd Armored Division (Spearhead)
- Task Force Hogan
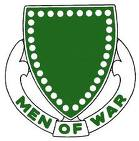
- Active: 1941-1945
- Allegiance: United States of America
- Branch: United States Army
- Type: Armor battalion
- Role: Breakthrough and exploitation
- Nicknames: Task Force Hogan; Hogan's 400; Hogan's Black Face Boys
- Engagements: World War II *Normandy *Falaise *Liberation of France *Liberation of Belgium *Siegfried Line *Battle of Aachen *Battle of the Bulge *Central Europe

3rd Battalion of the 33rd Armored Regiment of the 3rd Armored Division, was a tank battalion in the United States Army. During World War II they fought in most of the major battles in the European Theater of Operations. The battalion found itself in the path of both major German counteroffensives in the West: Operation Luttich and Operation Watch on the Rhine, known as the Battle of the Bulge or Ardennes offensive. Cut off and surrounded in both battles, they fought their way out to rejoin friendly lines and continue the fight. 3/33 AR was also one of a select few units to have participated in closing all three of the major envelopments or pockets in the ETO: Falaise, Mons and the Ruhr-helping capture almost half a million enemy troops in total. As an attached unit to 1st Infantry Division, they were the first to capture a major German city (Aachen), the first to use flamethrowers in urban combat and, as part of the 3rd Armored Division, was the first to cross into Germany in wartime since Napoleon. They also participated in the longest single-day advance against enemy resistance in modern warfare history (90 miles).

== History ==
=== Activation and Training ===
The 33rd Armored Regiment and its subordinate battalions stood up on 12 May 1941 at Camp Beauregard, Louisiana from a cadre of prewar officers and sergeants, many from the 2nd Armored Division. The unit took in new soldiers under the "selectee" program thus expanding to division size under the colors of the newly minted 3rd Armored Division. The Armored Force was also established the same year with cadres from the Cavalry branch.

Initial training began at the newly cleared and built Camp Polk, Louisiana by fall 1941. There, despite using obsolete Grant medium tanks, the 3rd Armored Division became a potent tank force. They competed in "war games" with the 1st Armored Division outmaneuvering the latter to seize their objective on the Calcasieu River.

December 1941 and the entry of the United States into WWII brought new urgency to training and preparation for war. Commanding the 3rd Battalion, 33rd Armored Regiment was newly promoted Major Samuel M Hogan. One of the few mid-grade officers with more than a few months experience in the regular Army, Hogan would lead the unit through the following three years of training and then combat in the European Theater of Operations.

In July 1942, the division loaded up on more than 30 trains for the four-day journey to the Mohave Desert for field training as tank companies and battalions. In this harsh environment, the tankers of 33rd Armored Regiment learned how to shoot, move and communicate as units, the importance of preventive maintenance to keep their steel "horses" running, as well as the challenges of living "in the field" for extended periods of time.

From there they returned to the cold and damp for fall training at Camp Pickett, Virginia in October 1942. The tankers participated in increasingly more complex maneuvers. Their leaders took part in Command Post Exercises and learned to control company and battalion formations using radio and wire communications from their command tanks or mobile "jump" command posts.

Promoted to Lieutenant Colonel, Samuel Hogan became likely the youngest tank battalion commander in the US Army at age 27. By the September 5th 1943, the division was trained to a sharp edge and boarded troop transports to England where they settled in for the preparations for Operation Overlord and the invasion of Europe. Based out of Warminster Barracks, England. 3rd Battalion, 33rd Armored regiment took on additional maneuvers in the frigid Salisbury plains.

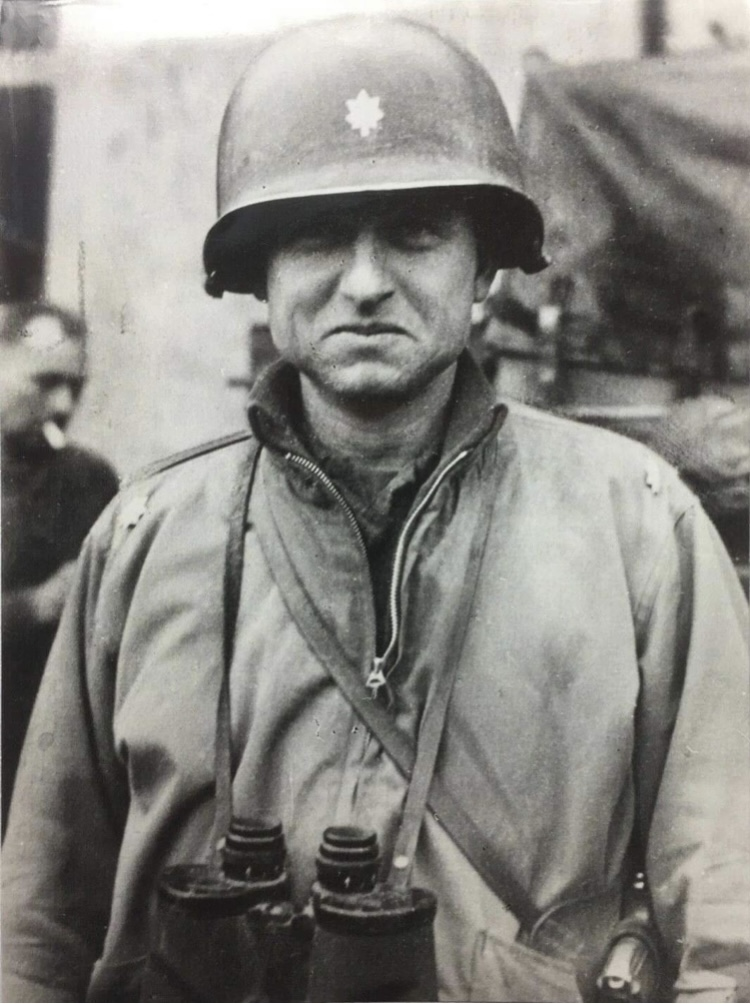
Lieutenant Colonel Samuel M Hogan, USA. CO of 3/33 AR, also known as Task Force Hogan, during WWII

The Division's organization and equipment was finalized. As the second of only two heavy armored divisions in the entire US Army, the division's tank battalions wielded two companies of M4 Sherman medium tanks and one company of M5 Stuart light tanks. Each company had 15 tanks for a total of 54 tanks. Each battalion also had a 81mm mortar platoon carried aboard M3 Half Tracks and one platoon of M8 Howitzer Motor Carriage 75mm "Assault Guns". A medical section, mechanics, supply personnel, staff and cooks rounded out the authorized strength of 504 soldiers in the battalion.

Lessons learned in the hedgerow fighting showed that the heavy armored division was lacking infantry to protect the tanks from state-of-the-art anti-tank weapons employed by the Wehrmacht. In addition, they were vulnerable to mines and needed engineer and air defense support especially for the many rivers that needed to be crossed, sometimes under enemy fire, along their path to Berlin. When reinforced with external units, such as Infantry, Engineers, Air Defense, according to its assigned missions, the battalion became known as a Task Force. During World War II, battalion and regimental task forces bore the last name of their commander.

=== Normandy ===
The battalion crossed the English Channel aboard Landing Ships, Tank (LSTs) landing on Omaha Beach on 23 June 1944. They took off the waterproofing from their tanks and drew additional ammunition before moving inland. For the next two weeks the troops conducted patrols and prepared for the breakout from the Normandy perimeter.

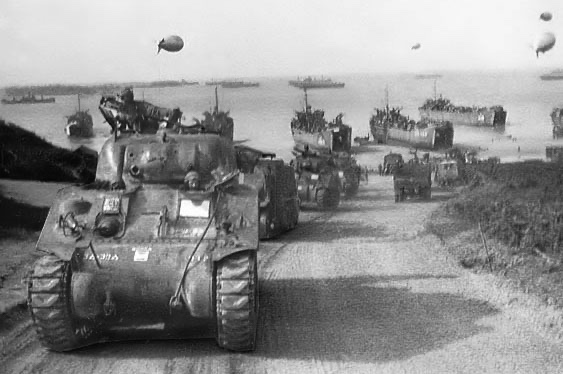
A Sherman tank from 3rd Battalion, 33rd Armored Regiment disembarks on Omaha Beach, Normandy on 23 June 1944

The battalion's first action was a fight through the Norman hedgerow country with the objective of seizing key terrain overlooking crossings on the Vire River at Pont Hebert. The battle for Hill 91, known to the locals as Hauts Vents -high winds, was bloody. For the better part of three days the fighting raged against elements of the vaunted Panzer Lehr division. P-47 air strikes and efficient use of artillery and mortars proved critical. The hill was captured on 11 July after which the Americans holding the American positions were subjected to fierce counterattacks including strafing runs by Luftwaffe Focke Wolfe FW-190 fighters. The exhausted tankers were relieved on 15 July by elements of the 30th Infantry Division. Hogan's command lost seven soldiers Killed in Action. All six command tanks had been destroyed by German fire including Hogan's. The driver Corporal Addison Darbison, remains missing in action to this day, likely incinerated inside his Sherman tank.

After some rest and recuperation, the battalion prepared to participate in Operation Cobra. On August 7, 1944, Hogan's command occupied a ridge near the village of Chérencé-le-Roussel when a probe of six Panzer IV tanks advanced towards their positions. In a short sharp engagement, all six enemy tanks were destroyed. The probe was part of the opening of Hitler's counteroffensive against the Normandy landings: Operation Luttich. The four-division counterattack to recapture coastal Avranches, a mere 18 miles from Hogan's positions. In one move, the Germans could’ve split the US First and Third Armies in two. Cut off from supply, General George S Patton’s Third Army, without its daily 25,000 gallons of fuel needed to move, would languish and die at the hands of mobile Kampfgruppe, the enemy equivalent of an armored task force.

For the following five days, Task Force Hogan fought to relieve the US 120th Infantry Regiment encircled in the hilltop redoubt of Mortain as they held off the German advance to Avranches. In the face of heavy German attacks by SS regiments, artillery of all types and several Luftwaffe sorties, they held their ground and kept pressure off the surrounded GIs of the 30th Infantry Division until 12 August, when Hitler gave his exhausted troops permission to discontinue the attack.

In March 2020, the Presidential Unit Citation was awarded to Task Force Hogan, 33rd Armored Regiment “For extraordinary heroism in action and outstanding performance of duty against armed enemy forces from 6 August 1994 to 12 August 1944 in the vicinity of Mortain, France.”

After Mortain, the German Army realized it could get trapped between the advancing Americans and the Anglo-Canadians moving south from Bayeux. The allies had a golden opportunity to conduct an envelopment of Army Group B and hasten an end to the war. General Omar Bradley moved his 12th Army Group east to trap the Germans near the town of Falaise. 3rd Armored Division and Task Force Hogan blitzed through central Normandy in a series of meeting engagements with the retreating Germans. Task Force Hogan formed the VII Corps flank with the French 2nd Armored Division rear the town of Ecouché. After doing their part to close the Falaise Pocket it was on to Belgium.

=== Liberation of Belgium ===
Hot in pursuit of the retreating Germans, 3rd Armored Division continued north to cut off the German's retreating towards the Siegfried Line. During the Battle of Mons they liberated Belgium's third largest city, in conjunction with the 1st and 9th Infantry Divisions. They also annihilated the German Seventh Army capturing 8,000 German troops while destroying much of the equipment and combat power that could’ve stopped the Allies at the German border fortifications of the Siegfried Line-or West Wall. Spearhead continued moving east toward the German border. Task Force soldiers remembered the liberation of Liége and its surrounding communities as joyous occasions with Belgian civilians pouring into the streets in impromptu celebrations as the tanker and their vehicles were covered in flowers, food, drink and the civilian population's embraces.

=== Siegfried Line and Liberation of Aachen ===
After liberating Liege, they crossed into Germany proper. Taking the gateway to the Ruhr industrial region, center of gravity of Nazi warfighting capability required the capture of Stolberg. Here, the VII Corp’s Spearhead 3rd Armored Division got a taste of how hard urban combat in Germany was going to be. Half of Stolberg’s population of 30,000 was evacuated before the battle, the rest of the dwellings taken over by German troops. Task Force Hogan made initial gains moving through the outskirts of town attacking downhill. Once inside the built up areas, German tank-killer teams armed with the Panzerfaust anti-tank rockets covered by machine gun fire knocked out lead tanks and sent the accompanying infantry scrambling for cover in doorways and drainage ditches. Tanks returned cannon and machine gun fire at the buildings on either side but advances were measured in meters.

Lieutenant Colonel Samuel Hogan eager to get any advantage over the entrenched enemy of the 12th Infantry Division, requested a section of M2 flamethrowers from the 23rd Engineer Battalion. The six soldiers, each armed with a flamethrower, heavy fuel canister strapped to their back, divided up among the infantry squads. The advance resumed by nightfall in streets lit up by tank cannon muzzle flashes and the orange glow of burning napalm inside cellars. The flamethrowers tactical and psychological impact helped the Americans advance to their objective, the main intersection of town where they halted allowing other units to come online.

The work was exhausting especially for the flamethrower crews who kept up with the advance, a 68-pound container of napalm strapped to their back. Lieutenant R. Eells, of the 23rd Engineers, reported that night that it was the first organized use of flamethrowers in urban combat operations in the European theater to “encourage” an enemy to abandon fortified positions.

By 21 September, Spearhead’s advance secured central Stolberg. Pockets of German resistance continued to the north as uneasy stalemate descended on the area but its capture helped VII Corps isolate Aachen, control the city’s water supply and trap German forces in the Huertgen forest.

By mid October 1944, the better part of three US divisions were tasked with capturing Aachen. The 3rd Battalion, 33rd Armored Regiment was attached to the 1st Infantry Division at the request of the division's commander, Major General Clarence Huebner. Task Force Hogan was to assault in the north, protecting the flank of the 3rd Battalion of the 26th Infantry while seizing the heights that dominated the central part of Aachen overlooking the German command posts located at the Hotel Quellenhof. Once the Lousberg heights were captured, Task Force Hogan would proceed down the reverse slope in order to cut off the Aachen-Laurensberg highway, thus preventing a German counterattack from the Northeast. Hogan’s tanks and GIs of the 26th Infantry Regiment “Blue Spaders" continued to perfect tank-infantry cooperation in urban combat. Their efforts paid off with the capture of the first major German city to fall to the Allies in WWII—the old imperial capital of Aachen.

=== Battle of the Bulge ===
On 19 December 1944, the only First Army units available to react to the German offensive through the Ardennes were the 82nd Airborne Division and one Combat Command of the 3rd Armored Division. Task Force Hogan was ordered to leave their advanced positions in Germany and double back to Belgium with the objective Houffalize. The Task Force was down to 1/3 of their available tanks and received zero intelligence about enemy strength or intentions.

After an all-night march towards the objective, with V-1 flying bombs pulsing overhead on the way to destroy allied supply dumps in Antwerp, they arrived at La Roche with fuel tanks half full and no planned resupply. A morning leaders recon left the command group cut off after running into a column of Germans dressed as Americans. Samuel Hogan, his Operations Officer, Major Travis Brown and the Recon Platoon Leader, Lieutenant Clark Worrell escaped into the woods as the enemy fired their guns at the escaping Americans. They were possibly saved by the German's attention on looting the American jeeps including one of Sam's prized Corsicana Fruit Cakes he had received from his family for the Christmas holiday ahead. Hogan and his staff rejoined the Task Force after spending 12 hours evading German patrols in the Ardennes forests. For the next six days Task Force Hogan fought skilled delaying actions from hilltop town to hilltop town until surrounded and cut off by the 116th Panzer (Greyhound) and 560th Volksgrenadier Divisions.

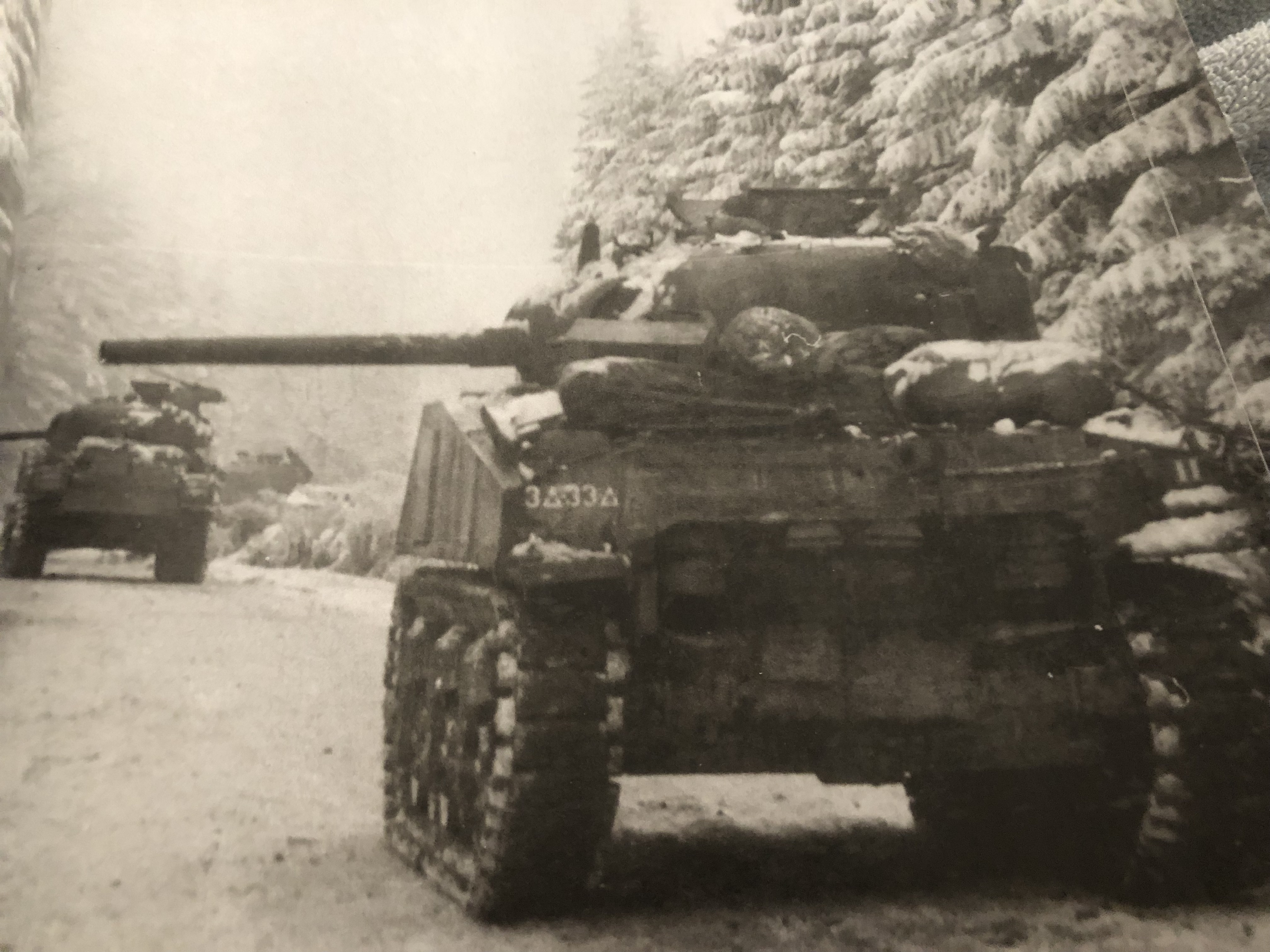
Two Task Force Hogan Sherman tanks move through the woods in the Ardennes during the Battle of the Bulge

The beleaguered battalion hindered the German advance by calling in artillery on the columns streaming around their hilltop redoubt at the town of Marcouray. But they were short of ammunition, fuel and medical supplies. Aerial resupply by C-47 cargo aircraft of the IX Troop Carrier Command, under Operation Repulse (air operation to resupply the 101st Airborne Division, surrounded at Bastogne, as well as Task Force Hogan, surrounded in Marcouray), and even by artillery shell failed, resulting only in several aircraft shot down. On Christmas Day, Major General Maurice Rose, Commanding General, 3rd Armored Division, ordered the task force to destroy their vehicles and make out on foot as best they could. All available units were dedicated to relieving the 101st Airborne Division, 20 miles away at Bastogne-so they were on their own.

On Christmas Night “Hogan’s 400” marched 12 miles through enemy held woods back to US lines.

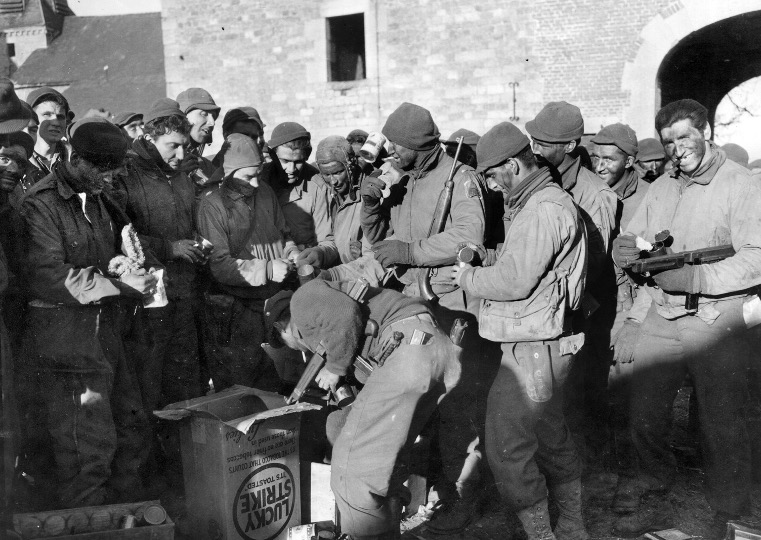
Task Force Hogan, or Hogan's 400 arrive back to friendly lines at Soy after marching all night from Marcouray during the Battle of the Bulge.

After their daring escape on Christmas Day, the Task Force rested for five days until they could receive new tanks, wheeled vehicles and small arms. On 3 January 1945 they participated in the counteroffensive to eliminate the bulge and push the Germans back to their starting point of 16 December 1944. After heavy fighting the final German units were driven back to their starting positions on 25 January 1945. The Bulge was the largest battle ever fought by the US Army. Spearhead sustained battle losses of 125 medium tanks, 38 light tanks, and 1,473 casualties, including 187 killed in action.

=== Rhineland ===
In early 1945, 3rd Armored Division was one of two divisions in the Army to receive the M26 Pershing tank. Hogan distributed his precious few Pershings to each company so they could lead the attacks as the German defense grew more fanatical. The Americans were glad to finally a receive a battle tank capable of taking on the much heavier and powerfully armed enemy Mark V Panther and Mark VI Tiger tanks.

The battalion helped capture Cologne in early March. Task Force Hogan's sector of Cologne was north of the central cathedral, encompassing the Ford factory district and the famous Cologne Zoo. The capture of Cologne was a success but did not yield its biggest prize, an untouched bridge across the Rhine river-the final natural obstacle before Berlin.

Heavy fighting occurred to cross the Erft, a Rhine tributary that, through a system of dams and dikes could have flooded the entire Ruhr plain delaying the allies progress east for weeks if not months. Hogan and his fellow Texan Lieutenant Colonel Walter Richardson, were buddies that had a friendly rivalry since the days of training in the United States. Richardson commanded 3rd Battalion, 32nd Armored Regiment and was another of Spearhead's highly competent young commanders. MG Rose encouraged a friendly competition by offering a case of Scotch to the first commander to get troops across the Erft. After heavy combat, Hogan got infantry across first on a footbridge, but Richardson got tanks across the following day. Spearhead being an armored division-they decided to split 50/50. Their respective staffs got to enjoy a well-deserved nip as they headed to cross the Rhine near Bad Honnef on 21 March 1945.

=== Central Europe ===
Once across the Rhine, Spearhead made history again with the longest single-day advance against an armed enemy in military history. To capture the German Army's Tank Training Center at Paderborn, Spearhead marched 90 miles in a single day. Task Force Hogan provided the flank screen for this operation.

The ensuing battle at Paderborn was a costly one where Spearhead took heavy casualties in battles against the German Tiger I and Tiger II. The battle resulted in the death of Spearhead's Division Commander, Major General Maurice Rose.

The mission had to continue though, and Brigadier General Doyle Hickey assumed command as Spearhead closed the Ruhr pocket linking up with 2nd Armored Division north of Paderborn, effectively destroying the German Army Group B as a fighting force. This was yet another history making first for Task Force Hogan and the 3rd Armored Division: they were one of a few units to participate in the closure of all three major German pockets in the European Theater: Falaise, Mons and Ruhr resulting in the capture of almost 400,000 enemy prisoners of war.

From there, Spearhead liberated the concentration camp at Nordhausen, which provided slave labor for the V-2 ballistic missile factory nearby at Dora-Mittelbau.

On 23 April 1945, with the capture of Dessau, the combat ended after 220 days. Spearhead and Task Force Hogan reached the Elbe River, less than 100 miles from Hitler's bunker in Berlin.

Below is the list of units that were attached to Task Force Hogan for combat operations from July 1944 to April 1945:

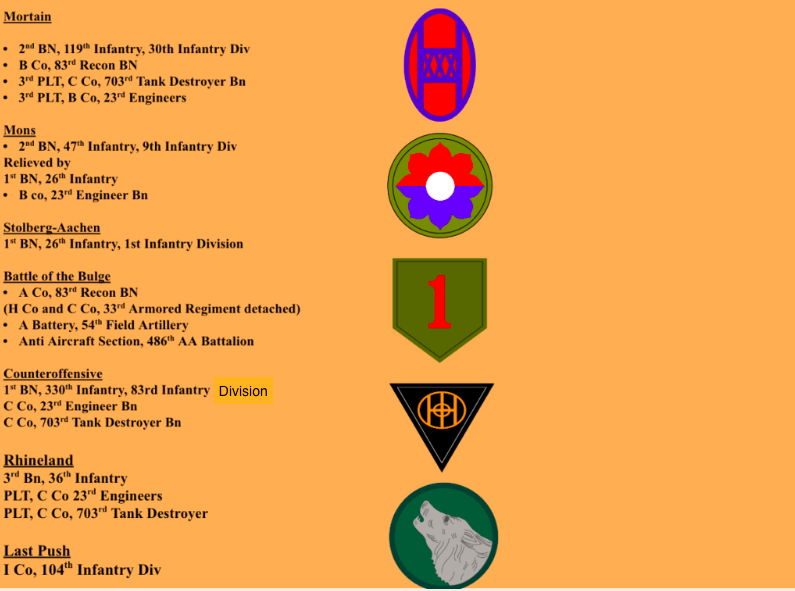

=== Occupation Duty ===
3rd Battalion, 33rd Armored Regiment began occupation duties shortly hostilities ended. Lieutenant Colonel Samuel Hogan relinquished command in the summer of 1945 as his officers and non-commissioned officers began rotating back to the United States. The 33rd Armored Regiment was deactivated on 10 November 1945 but would return to active service in 1948 to serve during the Cold War and beyond.

=== Primary Staff ===
- Executive Officer Major William Walker
- Operations Officer Major Travis Brown
- Personnel/Supply Officer Captain William Stalley
- Battalion Surgeon Captain (Doctor) Louis Spigelman, POW 26 December 1944

Captain (Doctor) Don Drolett

=== Company Commanders ===
- C Company

Captain Clarence "Ben" Creamer KIA 28 July 1944

Lieutenant Edwin Gunderson KIA 16 November 1944

- G Company

Captain Carl Cramer WIA 10 March 1945

Lieutenant Thomas Cooper

- H Company

Captain John Barclay WIA 10 July 1944

Lieutenant Edmund "Ed" Wray KIA 10 August 1944

Lieutenant Jacob Sitzes KIA 18 September 1944

Captain Heleman "Ted" Cardon

=== Company First Sergeants ===
- G Company First Sergeant Raby Moses
- H Company First Sergeant Ernest Filyaw
- Service Company First Sergeant Hoyt Rogers

=== Headquarters Units ===
- Scout Platoon

Lieutenant Clark Worrell

Staff Sergeant Shorty Wright

- Mortar Platoon

Lieutenant Robert Smalley

Staff Sergeant John Grimes

- Assault Gun Platoon

Lieutenant Thomas Magness

Staff Sergeant Arnold Schlaich

- Medical Platoon

Staff Sergeant Raymond Kuderka, POW 26 December 1944
