= Hanau Army Airfield =

Former German military airfield near Hanau, Hesse

Hanau / Langendiebach Army Airfield AAF Station Hanau/Langendiebach Advanced Landing Ground Y-91
- Hanau Army Airfield (Germany)

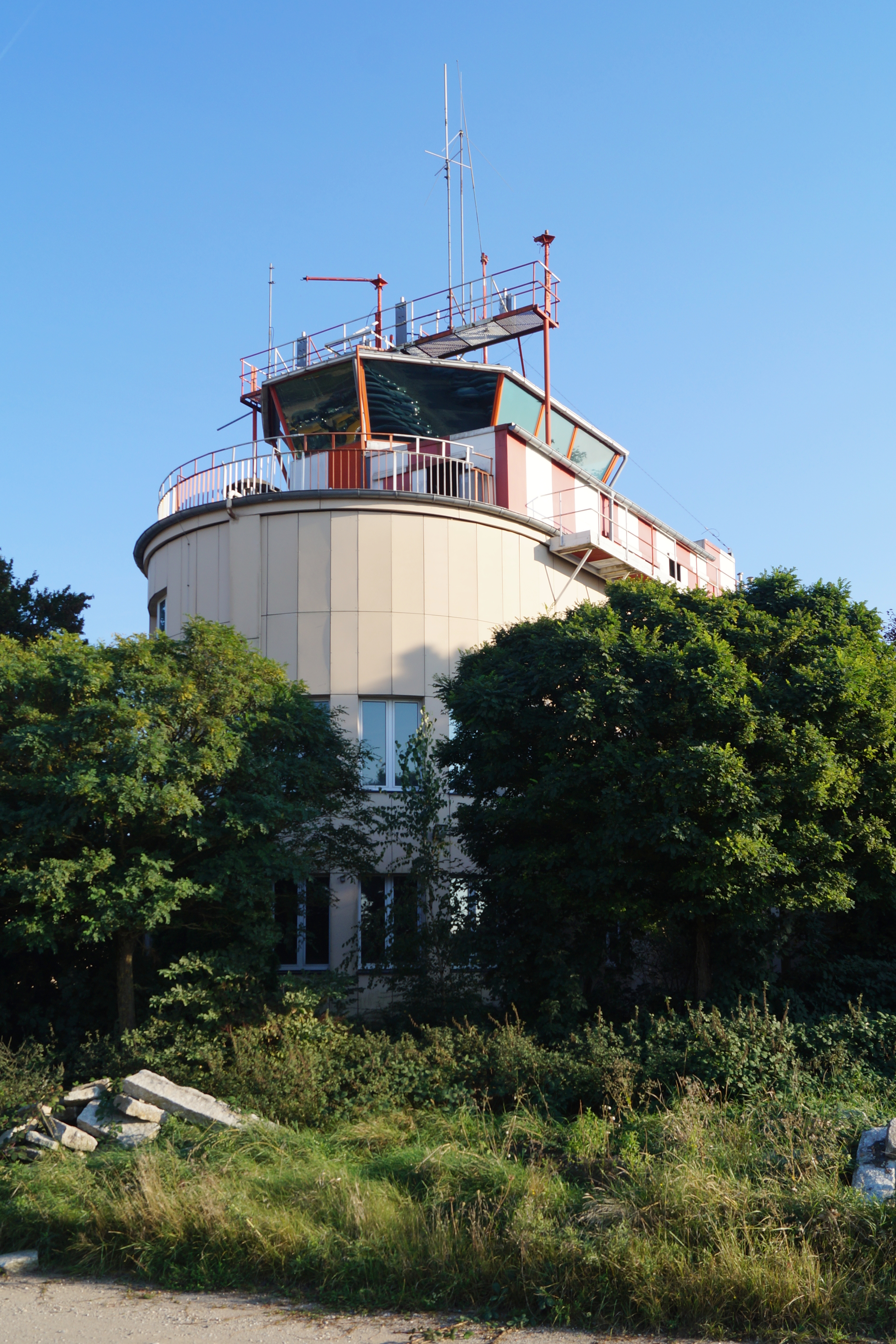
- The Control tower, in 2016

Site information
- Type: Military Airfield

Location
- Coordinates: 50°10′03″N 008°57′41″E

Site history
- In use: Closed 1992
- Battles/wars: Western Front (World War II)

Hanau Army Airfield (US Army), previously Fliegerhorst Langendiebach (Luftwaffe, 1939–45), is a former military airfield located in Langendiebach, part of the municipality of Erlensee, some 5 kilometres (3 miles) north-northeast of Hanau in Hesse, Germany.

== History ==
Even before the construction of the airfield 1937–39, Langendiebach was used for military purposes. During the Roman period (100-260 AD) Castrum Rückingen cohort and small Castrum Langendiebach was built to secure the Upper Germanic Limes border. A total of 500 legionaries were stationed from Dalmatia. Parts of these constructions can still be found.

The construction of the airfield goes back to an accident in 1936 during a military exercise, when a Junkers Ju 52 transport made an emergency landing on the meadows of Langendiebach.

Ground was broken for the construction of the Langendiebach Airfield, or Fliegerhorst Langendiebach as it was then known, in the summer of 1936. Although it was originally intended that there should be three phases of construction, only the first phase of construction was completed, due to the outbreak of World War II. On 19 March 1939 the official opening of the airfield was marked by a large celebration, involving a parade from the center of Erlensee to the front gate, and a festival with an air show which saw 25,000 civilian attendees.

In 1940, Langendiebach became the site of a glider school (Flughafen-Bereichs-Kommando 3/XII), the graduates of which went on to participate in, among other operations, the invasion of the Soviet Union ("Operation Barbarossa"). In addition to gliders, there were various experimental aviation units at Langendiebach, including a high-altitude fighter squadron. From the middle of 1944 until the Americans succeeded in crossing the Rhine, two successive groups of Junkers Ju 88 Nightfighters, the I/NJG 4 then III/NJG4, were stationed at Langendiebach. Once the Americans had crossed the Rhine River, these elements of the Nachtjagdgeschwader 4 (NJG 4) were withdrawn to North Eastern Germany.

The three most destructive bombing attacks on the Airfield Langendiebach occurred on 9 September 1944, 10 November 1944 and 24 December 1944. The bombing raid carried out on 10 November involved 229 B-24 Liberators, which dropped a total of 431.5 tons of bombs. This bombing was conducted in the light of recent intelligence, which revealed that the Langendiebach runway had recently been extended by some 300 meters to accommodate three Messerschmitt Me 262 jet fighters of Kampfgeschwader 55 (KG 55) "Greif", however the unit never received any of the jet fighters.

In order to divert allied attacks away from Langendiebach, the Germans emplaced decoy airfields, consisting of wooden mock-ups of aircraft and of airfield facilities, in the vicinity of Mittelbuchen, Kilianstädten, and Roßdorf. These succeeded in leading low-flying aircraft astray on many occasions, but could not prevent the comprehensive destruction inflicted upon Langendiebach by war's end. The buildings and facilities of the air base were assessed as 20% destroyed, and the severely pockmarked runway as totally unserviceable. Furthermore, the woods were bombed from Bärensee to Rückingen, in order to eliminate the camouflaged aircraft in parking spots concealed by woods. Present-day B40, which could be used as an auxiliary runway, was also bombed.

Fliegerhorst Langendiebach's facilities and airfield were totally unserviceable when the Americans occupied the area in April 1945, and the airfield was converted by IX Engineering Command, Ninth Air Force into an Army Air Forces advanced Landing Ground, designated Y-91. Air Force units used the airfield as a casualty evacuation and combat resupply airfield by the IX Air Service Command. After the German Capitulation on 8 May, it was re-designated as "Army Air Forces Station Hanau/Langendiebach". Army Air Forces units moved out in August, and the facility was taken over by United States Army.

Hanau became a major United States Army aviation facility during the Cold War, also known as Fliegerhorst Army Airfield. In 1952, several construction projects were undertaken to give the airfield back its character as a military facility. It was during this period that the large ammunition bunkers west of the airfield were built. From 1957 to 1960, Hangars 1302, 1303 and 1304, and the control tower were converted and refitted to accommodate helicopter aviation. Due to the troop reductions pursuant to the Conventional Forces in Europe Treaty and the Treaty of Vienna, many battalions have been removed from the Langendiebach facility since 1991, still it stands as one of the most important US Army Aviation Airfields in Europe until the end of the 1990s.

In 1990, the following elements were stationed at Hanau AAF:

- 2nd Battalion, 227th Aviation Regiment (United States): 18 AH-64A Apache, 13 OH-58C Kiowa, 3 UH-60A Black Hawk
- 3rd Battalion, 227th Aviation Regiment (United States): 18 AH-64A, 13 OH-58C, 3 UH-60A
- Bco 8/158th Aviation Regiment (United States) (AVIM): 6 UH-1H Huey
- I-227 Avn: 2 UH-1H
- TF Viper: 15 UH-60A, 3 EH-60C, 6 OH-58A, 6 OH-58D, 6 UH-1H
- 3rd Battalion 20th Field Artillery Regiment (United States) (Formerly 2/75th Field Artillery): 24 M109A3 SP Howitzers
- 1st Battalion 32 Field Artillery: 6 MGM-52 Lance Missile SP Launchers, 8 SP Loader/Transporters
- C Co and D Co 122 Support Battalion. (C Co Electronic Maintenance Shop and D Co 3rd Shop Vehicle Maintenance. C Co also ran the Class IX Warehouse at Grossauheim)

=== Closure ===
The airfield was gradually drawn down following Operations Desert Shield and Desert Storm, and was closed entirely no later than 2007. All US Army assets in the Hanau Military Community were officially returned to the local government in 2008, and the MilCom was deactivated.

=== Fire incident ===
On the afternoon of 30 June 2015 a fire broke out in the former Officer's Club / Bell Tower Building. Fire brigades from all over the whole Main Kinzig District and from Frankfurt could not prevent the total destruction of the historic building.

1/501st Avn Bn must also be included in the history! It is well known that the 227th Avn Bn was reflagged to the 1/501st Avn Bn once the 227th return from the first SFOR operation.

== References and external links ==
- Johnson, David C. (1988). U.S. Army Air Forces Continental Airfields (ETO), D-Day to V-E Day. Research Division, USAF Historical Research Center, Maxwell AFB, Alabama.
- Media related to Fliegerhorst Langendiebach at Wikimedia Commons
- Hanau Army Airfield
- History of Fliegerhorst Kaserne
