= General Rutherford (disambiguation) =

Griffith Rutherford (c. 1721–1805) was a North Carolina Militia brigadier general in the American Revolutionary War. General Rutherford may also refer to:

- Andrew Rutherford, 1st Earl of Teviot (died 1664), Scottish-born French Army lieutenant general (rank disputed)
- Donald L. Rutherford (born 1955), U.S. Army major general
- Jerry R. Rutherford (fl. 1960s–1990s), U.S. Army lieutenant general
- Robert L. Rutherford (1938–2013), U.S. Air Force general

== See also ==
- David Rutherford-Jones (born 1958), British Army major general
