= Admiral Anderson =

Admiral Anderson may refer to:

- Edwin Anderson Jr. (1860–1933), U.S. Navy admiral
- David Murray Anderson (1874–1936), British Royal Navy admiral
- Walter Stratton Anderson (1881–1981), U.S. Navy vice admiral
- George Whelan Anderson Jr. (1906–1992), U.S. Navy admiral
- William Lovett Anderson (1906–2004), U.S. Navy rear admiral
- Neil Anderson (RNZN officer) (1927–2010), Royal New Zealand Navy vice admiral
- John Rogers Anderson (born 1941), Royal Canadian Navy admiral
- Mark Anderson (Royal Navy officer) (fl. 1974–2011), British Royal Navy rear admiral
- Edward L. Anderson (fl. 1990–present), U.S. Navy rear admiral

== See also ==
- General Anderson (disambiguation)
