= Third Armored =

Third Armored may refer to:

- 3rd Armored Division (United States)
- 3d Armored Cavalry Regiment (United States)
