= General Anderson =

General Anderson may refer to:

== United Kingdom ==
- Alexander Anderson (Royal Marines officer) (1807–1877), Royal Marines general
- Alexander Vass Anderson (1895–1963), British Army major general
- Sir Charles Alexander Anderson (1857–1940), British Army lieutenant general
- Sir Desmond Anderson (1885–1967), British Army lieutenant general
- Sir Duncan Anderson (British Army officer) (1901–1980), British Army brigadier general
- Sir Gilmour Anderson (1914–1977), British Army brigadier general
- Sir Hastings Anderson (1872–1930), British Army lieutenant general
- Sir Horace Searle Anderson (1833-1907), British Indian Army general
- John Anderson (British Army officer, born 1908) (1908–1988), British Army general
- Sir John Evelyn Anderson (1916–2007), British Army major general
- Sir Kenneth Anderson (British Army officer) (1891–1959), British Army general
- Sir Richard Anderson (British Army officer) (1907–1979), British Army lieutenant general
- Robert Charles Beckett Anderson (1895–1982), British Army brigadier general
- Stuart Milligan Anderson, British brigadier general

== United States ==
=== U.S. Army ===
- Andy Anderson (general) (1913–2010), U.S. Army major general
- Edward Anderson (American general, born 1864) (1864–1937), U.S. Army brigadier general
- Edward D. Anderson (1868–1940), U.S. Army brigadier general
- John B. Anderson (United States Army officer) (1891–1976), U.S. Army major general
- Joseph Anderson (U.S. Army general) (born 1959), U.S. Army lieutenant general
- LeRoy H. Anderson (1906–1991), U.S. Army Reserve major general
- Marcia Anderson (born 1957), U.S. Army Reserve major general
- Thomas M. Anderson (1836–1917), U.S. Army brigadier general
- Thurman Anderson (born 1932), U.S. Army major general
- Robert Anderson (Union officer) (1805–1871), Union Army brigadier general

=== U.S. Air Force ===
- Andrew B. Anderson Jr. (1926–2016), U.S. Air Force lieutenant general
- Dagvin Anderson (fl. 1990s–2020s), U.S. Air Force major general
- Edgar R. Anderson Jr. (born 1940), U.S. Air Force lieutenant general
- Edward W. Anderson (1903–1979), U.S. Air Force major general
- George K. Anderson (fl. 1970s–1990s), U.S. Air Force major general
- Marcus A. Anderson (born 1939), U.S. Air Force major lieutenant general
- Orvil A. Anderson (1895–1965), U.S. Air Force major general
- Richard Dean Anderson, actor and honorary U.S. Air Force brigadier general
- Samuel E. Anderson (1906–1982), U.S. Air Force general

=== Confederate States Army ===
- Charles D. Anderson (1827–1901), Confederate States Army brigadier general
- George B. Anderson (1831–1862), Confederate States Army brigadier general
- George T. Anderson (1824–1901), Confederate States Army brigadier general
- James Patton Anderson (1822–1872), Confederate States Army major general
- Joseph R. Anderson (1813–1892), Confederate States Army brigadier general
- Richard H. Anderson (general) (1821–1879), Confederate States Army lieutenant general
- Robert H. Anderson (Confederate officer) (1835–1888), Confederate States Army brigadier general
- Samuel Read Anderson (1804–1883), Confederate States Army brigadier general

=== Others ===
- Earl E. Anderson (1919–2015), U.S. Marine Corps general
- Joseph T. Anderson (born 1946), U.S. Marine Corps major general
- Robert Anderson (Revolutionary War) (1741–1813), South Carolina Militia brigadier general

== Other ==
- A. T. Anderson (1886–1949), Australian Army brigadier general
- Sir Robert Anderson (Australian general) (1865–1940), Australian Army brigadier
- Thomas Victor Anderson (1881–1972), Canadian Army major general
- Warren Melville Anderson (1894–1973), Australian Army major general
- William Anderson (Canadian Army officer) (1915–2000), Canadian Army lieutenant general

== See also ==
- Anderson (surname)
- Jan Andersson (Swedish Air Force officer) (born 1955), Swedish Air Force major general
- General Andersen (disambiguation)
- Attorney General Anderson (disambiguation)
