= Attorney General Anderson =

Attorney General Anderson may refer to:

- John Anderson Jr. (1917–2014), Attorney General of Kansas
- William Alexander Anderson (1842–1930), Attorney General of Virginia
- Forrest H. Anderson (1913–1989), Attorney General of Montana
- James Hodson Anderson (1909–1996), Attorney General of Nebraska
- James R. Anderson (1864–1913), Attorney General of South Australia
- Sigurd Anderson (1904–1990), Attorney General of South Dakota

== See also ==
- Andrea Anderson-Mason (fl. 2010s), Attorney General of New Brunswick
- Elizabeth Barrett-Anderson (born 1953), Attorney General of Guam
- Maxwell Hendry Maxwell-Anderson (1879–1951), Attorney General of Gibraltar
- General Anderson (disambiguation)
