= 3rd Armored Division (United States) =

Inactive US Army formation

- The 3rd Armored Division's shoulder sleeve insignia.
- Active: 13 January 1941–10 November 1945; 15 July 1947–15 August 1992
- Country: United States
- Branch: United States Army
- Type: Armor
- Role: Armored warfare
- Size: Typically 15,000+
- Nickname: "Spearhead"
- March: Spearhead March
- Engagements: World War II; Normandy; Northern France; Rhineland; Ardennes-Alsace; Central Europe; Southwest Asia; Defense of Saudi Arabia; Liberation of Kuwait
- Decorations: Presidential Unit Citation; Meritorious Unit Commendation; French Croix de guerre with palm Belgian Fourragere

Commanders
- Notable commanders: MG Maurice Rose; MG Gordon B. Rogers; MG Creighton Abrams

Insignia
- Flag
NATO Map Symbol
3

The 3rd Armored Division (also known as "Spearhead", 3rd Armored, and 3AD) was an armored division of the United States Army. Unofficially nicknamed the "Third Herd", the division was first activated in 1941 and was active in the European Theater of World War II. The division was stationed in West Germany for much of the Cold War and also participated in the Persian Gulf War. On 17 January 1992, still in Germany, the division ceased operations. In October 1992, it was formally inactivated as part of a general drawing down of U.S. military forces at the end of the Cold War.

== History ==
=== World War II ===
==== Division organization ====
===== Initial division organization =====
When the 3rd Armored Division was formed on 15 April 1941 it was composed of the following units:

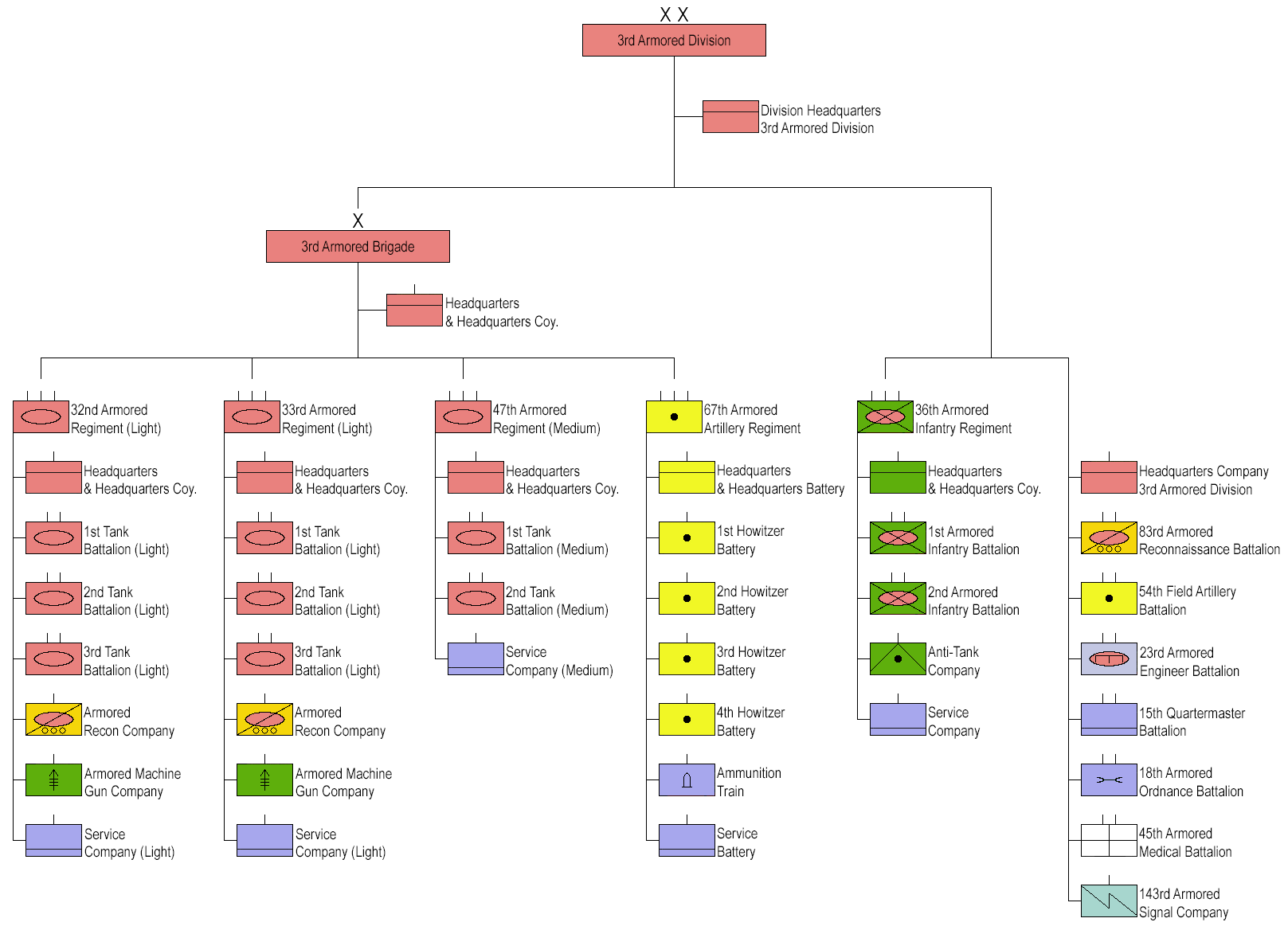
3rd Armored Division initial organization (click to enlarge)

- 3rd Armored Division
  - Division Headquarters
  - Headquarters Company, 3rd Armored Division
  - 143rd Armored Signal Company
  - 3rd Armored Brigade
    - Headquarters and Headquarters Company
    - 32nd Armored Regiment (Light)
      - Headquarters and Headquarters Company
      - Armored Reconnaissance Company (M3 scout cars)
      - Armored Machine Gun Company (M2 half-track cars and M1919 .30-caliber machine guns)
      - Service Company (Light)
      - 3× Tank battalions (Light)
        - each battalion consists of: 1× Headquarters and Headquarters Platoon, 3× tank companies with M3 Stuart light tanks
    - 33rd Armored Regiment (Light)
      - same organization as 1st Armored Regiment (Light)
    - 47th Armored Regiment (Medium) (transferred in June 1942 to the 14th Armored Division)
      - Headquarters and Headquarters Company
      - Service Company (Medium)
      - 2× Tank battalions (Medium)
        - each battalion consists of: 1× Headquarters and Headquarters Platoon, 3× tank companies with M3 Lee medium tanks
    - 67th Armored Field Artillery Regiment
      - Headquarters and Headquarters Battery
        - 4× Field artillery batteries (24× M2 105mm towed howitzers)
      - Ammunition Train
      - Service Battery
  - 36th Armored Infantry Regiment
    - Headquarters and Headquarters Company
    - 2× Armored infantry battalions
      - each battalion consists of: 1× Headquarters and Headquarters Platoon, 3× Rifle companies on M3 half-tracks, and 1× Heavy Weapons Company with M3 37mm Anti-Tank guns and M4 mortar carriers
    - Anti-Tank Company (M3 37mm Anti-Tank guns)
    - Service Company
  - 83rd Armored Reconnaissance Battalion
    - Headquarters and Headquarters Detachment
    - 2× Armored reconnaissance companies (M3 scout cars)
    - Light Tank Company (M3 Stuart light tanks)
    - Armored Reconnaissance Rifle Company (M3 half-tracks)
  - 54th Field Artillery Battalion
    - Headquarters and Headquarters Battery
    - 3× Field artillery batteries (12× M2 105mm towed howitzers)
    - Anti-Tank Gun Battery (8× M1897 75mm anti-tank guns)
    - Service Battery
  - 23rd Armored Engineer Battalion
    - Headquarters and Headquarters Company
    - 3× Armored engineer companies
    - Bridge Company
  - 15th Quartermaster Battalion
    - Headquarters and Headquarters Company
    - Quartermaster Truck Company
    - Light Maintenance Quartermaster Company
  - 18th Armored Ordnance Battalion
    - Headquarters and Headquarters Company
    - 2× Ordnance companies
  - 45th Armored Medical Battalion
    - Headquarters and Headquarters Detachment
    - Medical Collecting Company
    - Medical Clearing Company
    - Division Surgeon's Office

===== Heavy armored division =====
The Louisiana Maneuvers in August and September 1941 had a profound impact on the organization of US armored division. The exercises exposed that the existing armored divisions were too heavy in armor and too light in infantry and artillery. Additionally the divisions lacked the resources to organize combat teams, while the armored brigade complicated the command channel. It was also found that the division's service elements needed greater control. As a result the Table of Organization of armored divisions was radically reorganized: the armored brigade headquarter was eliminated. The number of armored regiments was reduced from three to two, and the two remaining armored regiments were reorganized to consist of one light and two medium tank battalions each. Three self-propelled 105mm howitzer battalions replaced the armored artillery regiment and field artillery battalion, and control of the artillery passed to an artillery section in the division headquarters. The armored infantry regiment was reorganized to consist of three battalions of three companies each. The engineer battalion added a fourth engineer company. Each divisions also formed two combat command headquarters, which did not have assigned units, but allowed the division commander to assemble combat teams as required. The quartermaster battalion was replaced by a supply battalion, while the ordnance battalion added a third ordnance maintenance company. For better control of the division's service elements, division trains were added. To support the division headquarters company a service company was formed, which provided transportation and supplies, and included the division's military police platoon.

After the reorganization the 3rd Armored Division was composed of the following units:

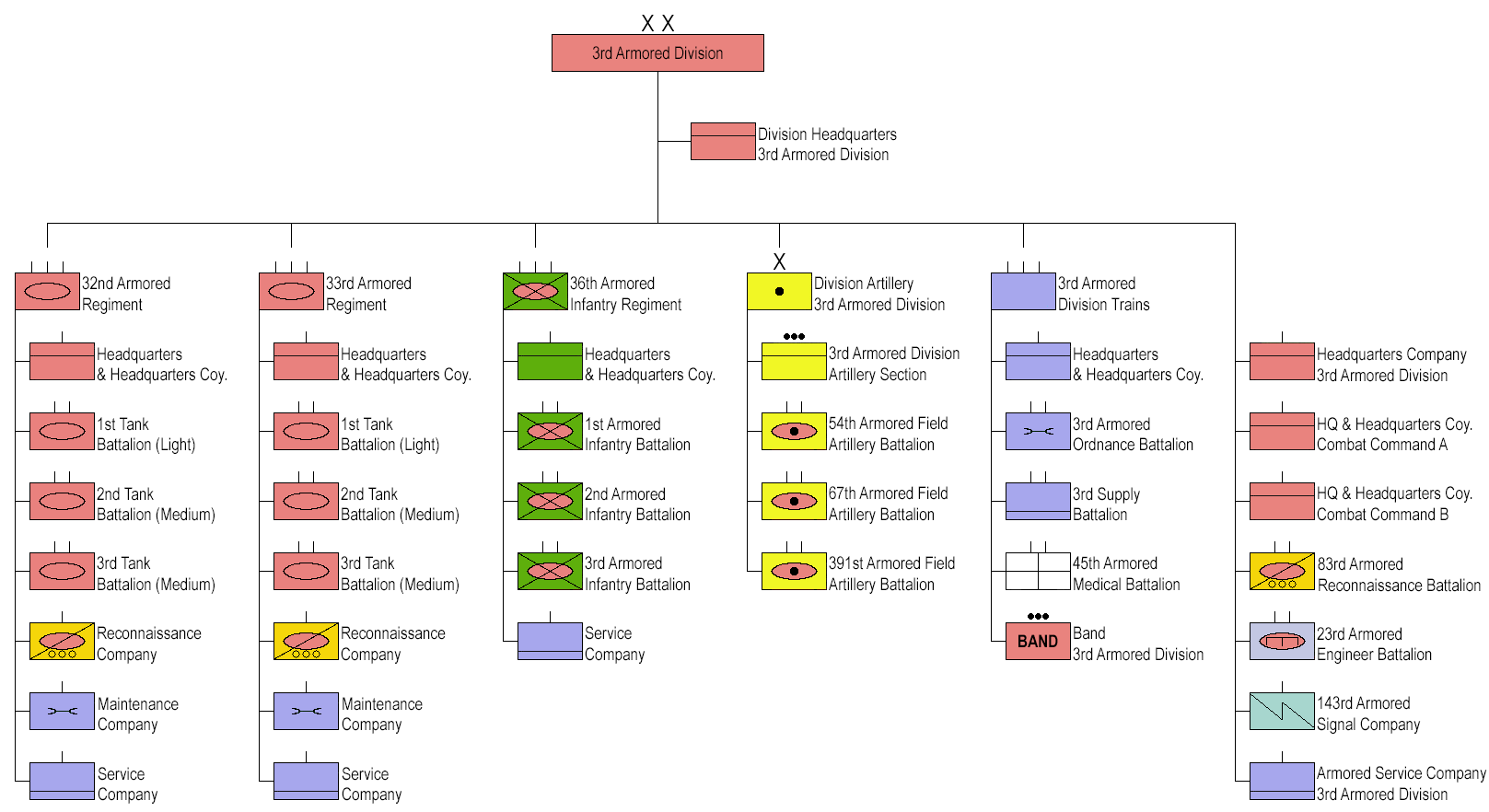
3rd Armored Division organization as a heavy armored division (click to enlarge)

- 3rd Armored Division
  - Division Headquarters
  - Headquarters Company, 3rd Armored Division
  - Headquarters and Headquarters Company, Combat Command A
  - Headquarters and Headquarters Company, Combat Command B
  - 143rd Armored Signal Company
  - Armored Service Company (includes the division's Military Police Platoon)
  - 32nd Armored Regiment
    - Headquarters and Headquarters Company
    - Reconnaissance Company (initially M3 scout cars and T30 HMC self propelled guns, which were replaced by M8 Greyhound armored cars and M8 Scott self propelled guns)
    - Maintenance Company
    - Service Company
    - 1st Tank Battalion (Light) (In June 1944 the battalion transferred its A and B companies to the 2nd and 3rd Tank Battalion and received F Company, respectively I Company, in return)
      - Headquarters and Headquarters Company
      - 3× Light Tank companies (A, B, C) (M3/M5 Stuart light tanks)
    - 2nd Tank Battalion (Medium) (In June 1944 the battalion exchanged F Company with the 1st Tank Battalion's A Company)
      - Headquarters and Headquarters Company
      - 3× Medium Tank companies (D, E, F) (M4 Sherman tanks)
    - 3rd Tank Battalion (Medium)
      - Headquarters and Headquarters Company (In June 1944 the battalion exchanged I Company with the 1st Tank Battalion's B Company)
      - 3× Medium Tank companies (G, H, I) (M4 Sherman tanks)
  - 33rd Armored Regiment
    - same organization as 32nd Armored Regiment
    - 3rd Tank Battalion (Medium)
      - Headquarters and Headquarters Company
      - 2× Medium Tank companies (G, H) (M4 Sherman tanks), 1x Light Tank company (C) (M5 Stuart)
  - 36th Armored Infantry Regiment
    - Headquarters and Headquarters Company
    - 3× Armored infantry battalions
      - each battalion consists of: 1× Headquarters and Headquarters Company, 3× Rifle companies on M3 half-tracks
    - Service Company
  - 83rd Armored Reconnaissance Battalion
    - Headquarters and Headquarters Company
    - 3× Reconnaissance companies (initially M3 scout cars and then M8 Greyhound armored cars)
    - Light Tank Company (M3/M5 Stuart or M24 Chaffee light tanks)
  - 23rd Armored Engineer Battalion
    - Headquarters and Headquarters Company
    - 4× Armored engineer companies
    - Bridge Company
  - 3rd Armored Division Artillery
    - 3rd Armored Division Artillery Section
    - 54th Armored Field Artillery Battalion
      - Headquarters and Headquarters Battery
      - 3× Field artillery batteries (M7 Priest self propelled howitzers)
      - Service Battery
    - 67th Armored Field Artillery Battalion
      - same organization as 54th Armored Field Artillery Battalion
    - 391st Armored Field Artillery Battalion
      - same organization as 54th Armored Field Artillery Battalion
  - 3rd Armored Division Trains
    - Headquarters and Headquarters Company
    - 3rd Armored Ordnance Battalion
      - Headquarters and Headquarters Company
      - 3× Maintenance companies
    - 3rd Supply Battalion
      - Headquarters and Headquarters Company
      - 2× Truck companies
    - 45th Armored Medical Battalion
      - Headquarters and Headquarters Company
      - 3× Medical companies
    - 3rd Armored Division Band

Attached units:<

- 643rd Tank Destroyer Battalion (attached 22 to 26 December 1944)
- 644th Tank Destroyer Battalion
- 703rd Tank Destroyer Battalion (attached 25 June 1944 to 17 December 1944; 2 January 1945 to 9 May 1945)
- 803rd Tank Destroyer Battalion (attached 25 June 1944 to 2 July 1944)
- 413th AAA Gun Battalion (attached 7 July 1944 to 16 July 1944)
- 486th AAA Auto-Weapons Battalion (attached 25 June 1944 to 9 May 1945)

==== Training timeline ====
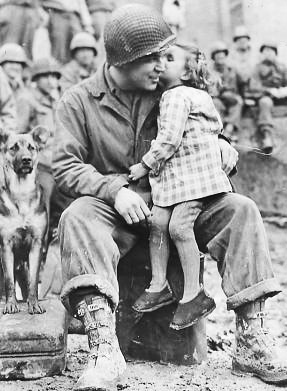
3rd AD soldier and a young admirer

The 3rd Armored was activated on 15 April 1941 at Camp Beauregard, LA. In June 1941, it moved to Camp Polk, Louisiana (now Fort Johnson). On 9 March 1942, it came under the jurisdiction of the Army Ground Forces and was assigned to the II Armored Corps. In July 1942 it was transferred to Camp Young, CA and from August to October 1942, took part in maneuvers at the Desert Training Center there. It left Camp Young in January 1943 and moved to the Indiantown Gap Military Reservation in Pennsylvania.

The division arrived in the European Theatre on 15 September 1943, conducting pre-invasion training near Liverpool and Bristol in Great Britain. It remained in Somerset, England until 24 June 1944, when it departed to partake in the Normandy operations.

==== Combat chronicle ====
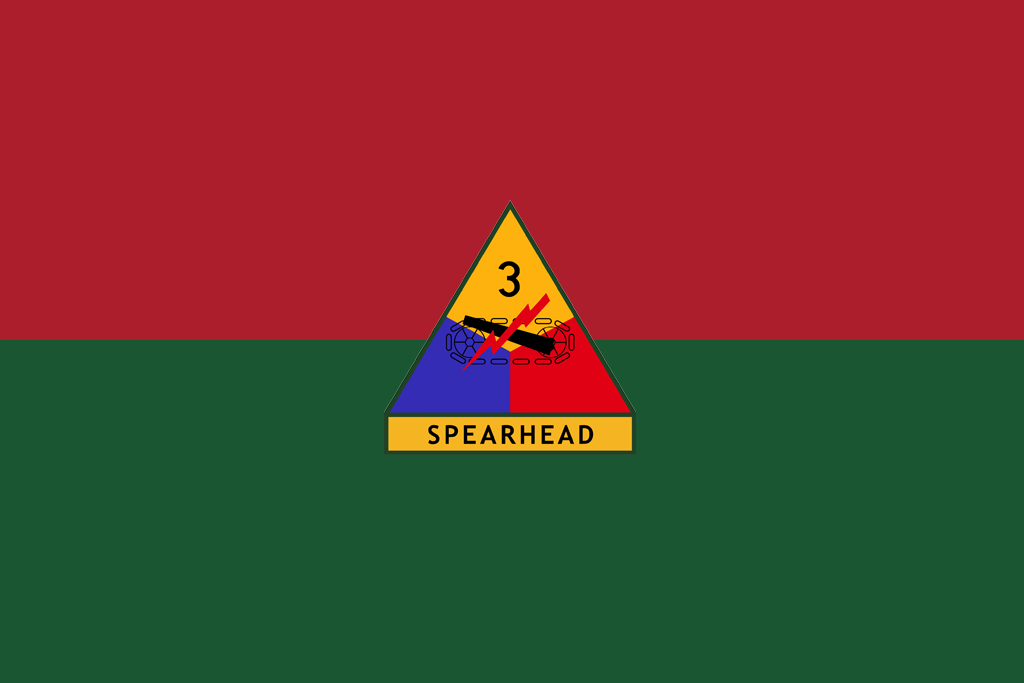
WWII 3rd Armored Division Flag

The first elements of the 3rd Armored saw combat on 29 June in France, with the division as a whole beginning combat operations on 9 July 1944. During this time, it was under the command of VII Corps and XVIII Airborne Corps First Army, but was later reassigned to the XIX Corps under the Ninth Army for the rest of the war.

The division was the "spearhead" of the First Army through the Normandy Campaign, taking part in a number of engagements, most notably in the Battle of Saint-Lô, where it suffered significant casualties. After facing heavy fighting in the hedgerows and developing methods to overcome the vast thickets of brush and earth that constrained its mobility, the unit broke out at Marigny alongside the 1st Infantry Division and swung south to Mayenne. 3rd AD engineers and maintenance crews solved the problem of the Norman hedgerows by taking the large I-Beam invasion barriers from the beaches at Normandy and welding them on the fronts of Sherman tanks as large crossing rams. They would then hit the hedgerows at high speed, bursting through them without exposing the vulnerable underbellies of the tanks.

3rd Armored Division was alerted on 6 August 1944, to respond to an enemy four-division counterattack in the direction of Avranches. The enemy counteroffensive, Operation Lüttich, had as it's objective to cut off the newly operational 3rd US Army from its supply line on the coast. From 8-13 August 1944, Spearhead units, including Task Forces Hogan and Lovelady of the 33rd Armored Regiment, battled elements of the 2nd Panzer, 1st SS Panzer (LSSAH), 2nd SS Panzer (Das Reich) and 17th SS Panzergrenadier Divisions who had encircled the 120th Infantry Regiment inside the hilltop town of Mortain. The relief of Mortain was accomplished but with heavy casualties. Task Force Hogan suffered 20 Killed in Action, 140 wounded in action and 14 tanks disabled or destroyed by enemy fire. The American victory left German Army Group B's best units strung out and battered. As the Anglo-Canadians surged south of Caen, the stage was set for the Falaise Pocket encirclement. On 11 March 2020, the 3rd Armored Division units involved in the Battle of Mortain were awarded the Presidential Unit Citation for "extraordinary heroism in action" as units attached to relieve the 30th Infantry Division.

The division was next ordered to help close the Argentan-Falaise Pocket containing the German Seventh Army, which it finished by 18 August near Putanges. Six days later, the outfit had sped through Courville and Chartres and was approaching the banks of the Seine River. On the night of 25 August 1944, the division began the crossing of the Seine; once completed, the 3rd moved across France, reaching the Belgian border on 2 September 1944.

Liberated in the path of the division were Meaux, Soissons, Laon, Marle, Mons, Charleroi, Namur and Liège. The division cut off 40,000 Wehrmacht troops at Mons and captured 8,000 prisoners.

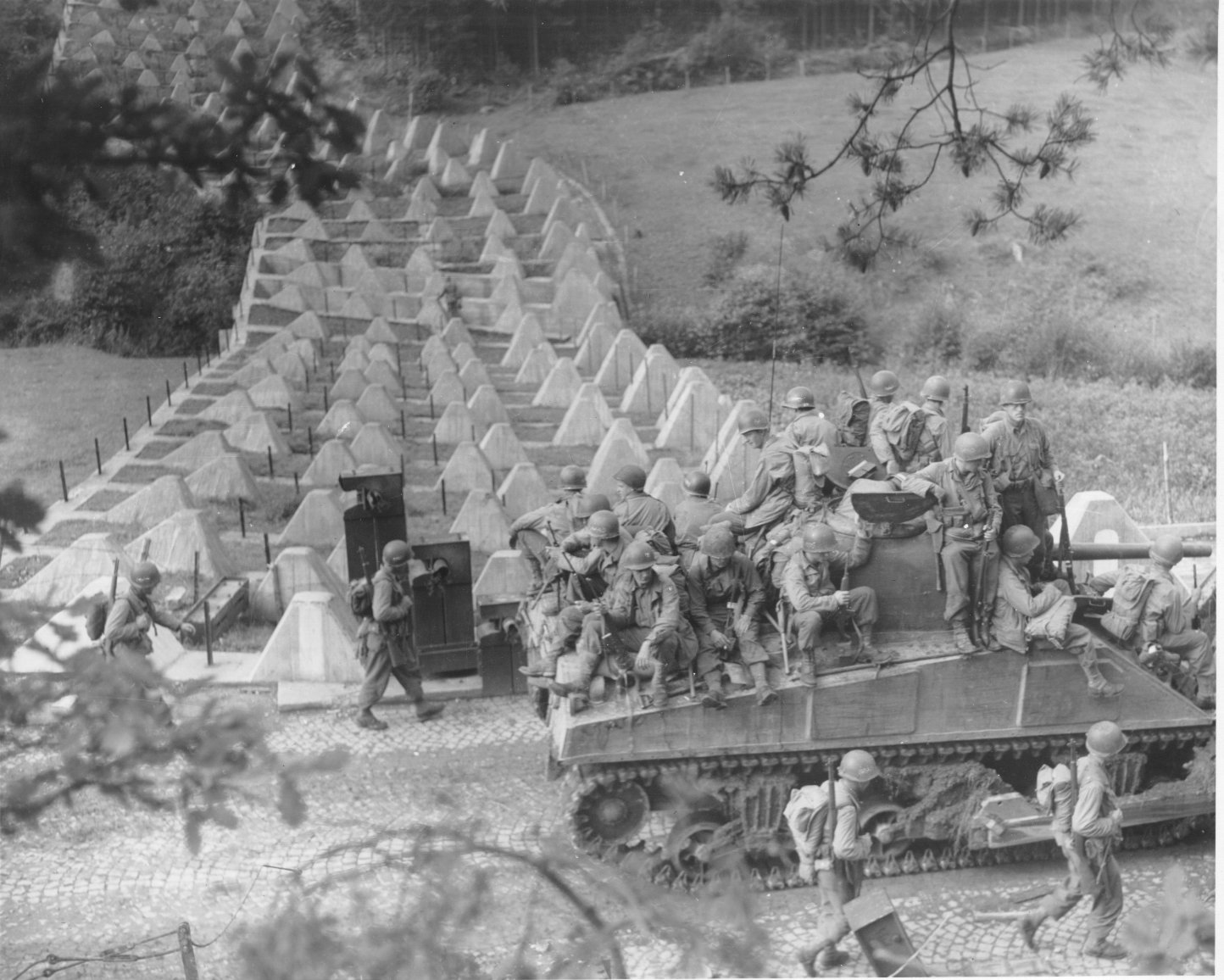
Division troops crossing the Siegfried line to Germany.

===== Hurtgen and the Bulge =====
On 10 September 1944, the 3rd, now nicknamed the "Spearhead Division", fired what it claimed was the first American field artillery shell onto German soil of the war. Two days later, it passed the German border and soon breached the Siegfried Line after taking part in the Battle of Hürtgen Forest.

During the Battle of Aachen, in mid-October 1944, a 3rd Armored Division tank battalion (Task Force Hogan), attached to the 1st Infantry Division, assisted in the capture of the old imperial capital. This action added the liberation of the first major city inside Germany to Spearhead's long list of accomplishments during World War II. The reinforced Sherman battalion, commanded by Lieutenant Colonel Samuel Hogan, assaulted through the center of Aachen north, while protecting the flank of the 3rd Battalion, 26th Infantry Regiment. They seized the Lousberg Heights which overlooked the German headquarters, then proceeded to cut off the Aachen-Laurensberg highway, thus blocking any potential enemy counterattack from the Northeast.

The 3rd Armored Division fought far north of the deepest German penetration during the Battle of the Bulge. The division worked its way south in an attack designed to help wipe out the bulge and bring First Army's line abreast of General George S. Patton's Third Army, which was fighting northward toward Houffalize. It severed a vital highway leading to St. Vith and later reached Lierneux, Belgium, where it halted to refit.

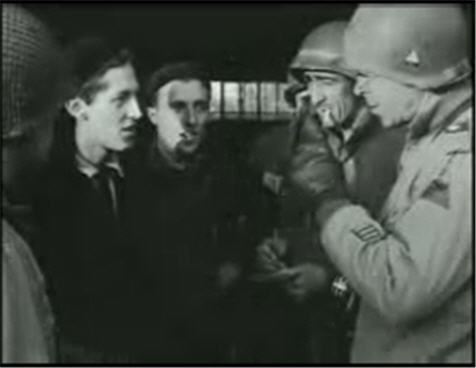
General Boudinot and 3rd AD Officers question locals after liberation of concentration camp

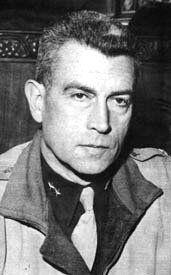
Major General Maurice Rose, Killed in Action, March 1945

===== Into the German heartland =====
After a month of rest, the division resumed its offensive to the east, and on 26 February, rolled back inside Germany. In the following weeks, the 3rd bolted across the Roer River and seized several towns, crossed the Erft, and at last broke through to the Rhine River to capture Cologne by 7 March. During the engagement in Cologne, a spectacular film was shot of a 3rd Division T-26E Pershing ("Eagle 7") defeating a German PzKPfW V "Panther" that caught the Pershing by surprise in the city streets on 6 March. Two weeks later, it crossed the Rhine at Honnef, a town south of Cologne.

On 31 March, the commander of the division, Major General Maurice Rose, rounded a corner in his jeep and found himself face to face with a German tank. As he withdrew his pistol either to throw it to the ground or in an attempt to fight back, the young German tank commander, apparently misunderstanding Rose's intentions, shot and killed the general.

After Cologne, the division swept up Paderborn in its advance to shut the back door to the Ruhr Pocket. In April, the division crossed the Saale River north of Halle and sped on toward the Elbe River.

On 11 April 1945, the 3rd Armored discovered the Dora-Mittelbau concentration camp. The division was the first to arrive on the scene, reporting back to headquarters that it had uncovered a large concentration camp near the town of Nordhausen. With help from the 104th Infantry Division, the 3rd immediately began transporting some 250 prisoners to nearby hospitals.

The division's last major fighting in the war was the Battle of Dessau, which the division captured on 23 April 1945 after three days of combat. Following the action at Dessau, the division moved into corps reserve at Sangerhausen. Occupational duty near Langen was given to the division following V-E Day, a role it filled until inactivation on 10 November 1945.

==== Casualties ====
The 3rd Armored Division suffered the following casualties:

- Total battle casualties: 9,243
- Killed in action: 1,810
- Wounded in action: 6,963
- Missing in action: 104
- Prisoner of war: 366

==== Enemy casualties ====
The division inflicted the following enemy casualties:

- Combat vehicles destroyed: 6,751
- Prisoners of war: 76,720

==== Individual awards ====
Members of the division received the following awards:

- Distinguished Service Crosses – 17
- Legions of Merit – 23
- Silver Stars – 885
- Soldiers Medal – 32
- Bronze Stars – 3,884
- Purple Hearts – in excess of 10,500
- Air Medals – 138
- Distinguished Flying Crosses – 3

=== Cold War ===
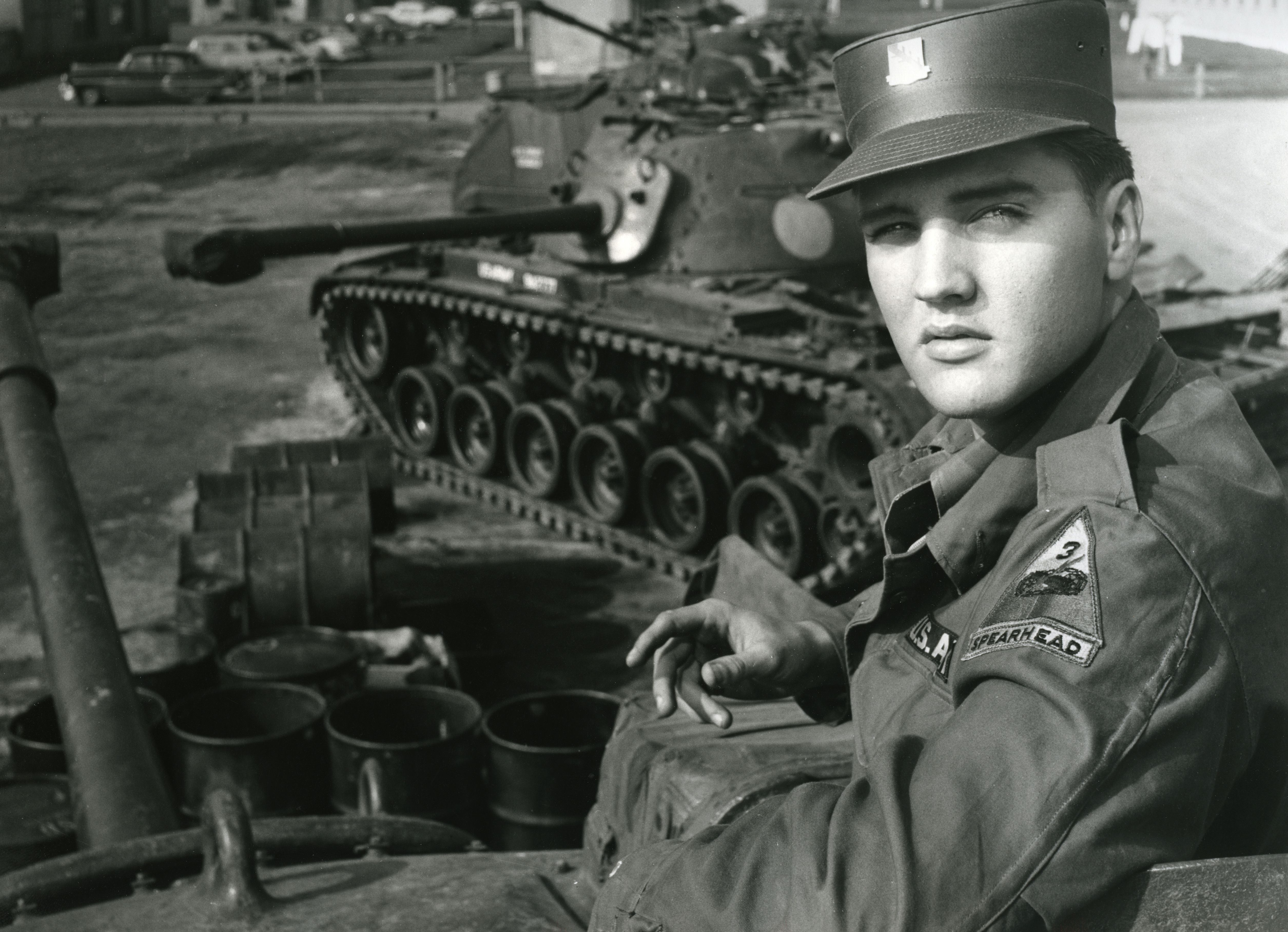
Elvis Presley at Ray Barracks, 1958

The division was reactivated on 15 July 1947 at Fort Knox, Kentucky as a training formation. In 1955, the 3rd Armored Division was reorganized for combat and was shipped to Germany the next year. It replaced the 4th Infantry Division under a program called Operation Gyroscope. It was the first U.S. armored division to be stationed east of the Rhine in the Cold War. The division, headquartered at Frankfurt am Main, served in Cold War Germany for approximately 36 years, from May 1956 to July 1992, with the exception of time spent in Saudi Arabia and Iraq during the leadup to and fighting of the Gulf War. The three main combat forces headquarters for the 3rd AD were (1) Ayers Kaserne at Kirch-Goens and Schloss Kaserne at Butzbach (The forces at these Kasernes initially formed Combat Command "A" [CCA] of the 3rd Armored Division), (2) Coleman Kaserne at Gelnhausen (CCB/2d Brigade); and (3) Ray Barracks at Friedberg (CCC/3rd Brigade).

The most famous soldier in the division during the 1950s was Elvis Presley, who was assigned to the 1st Medium Tank Battalion, 32d Armor, at Ray Barracks. After his time in service, Presley made a movie called G.I. Blues in which he portrays a 3rd Armored Division tank crewman with little field duty but with much opportunity for singing, particularly at Frankfurt. In real life Presley was promoted to sergeant near the end of his tour in Germany without the prospect of attending the 3d Armored Division Non Commissioned Officer Academy. In the movie he wears the insignia of a specialist five rather than sergeant's stripes.

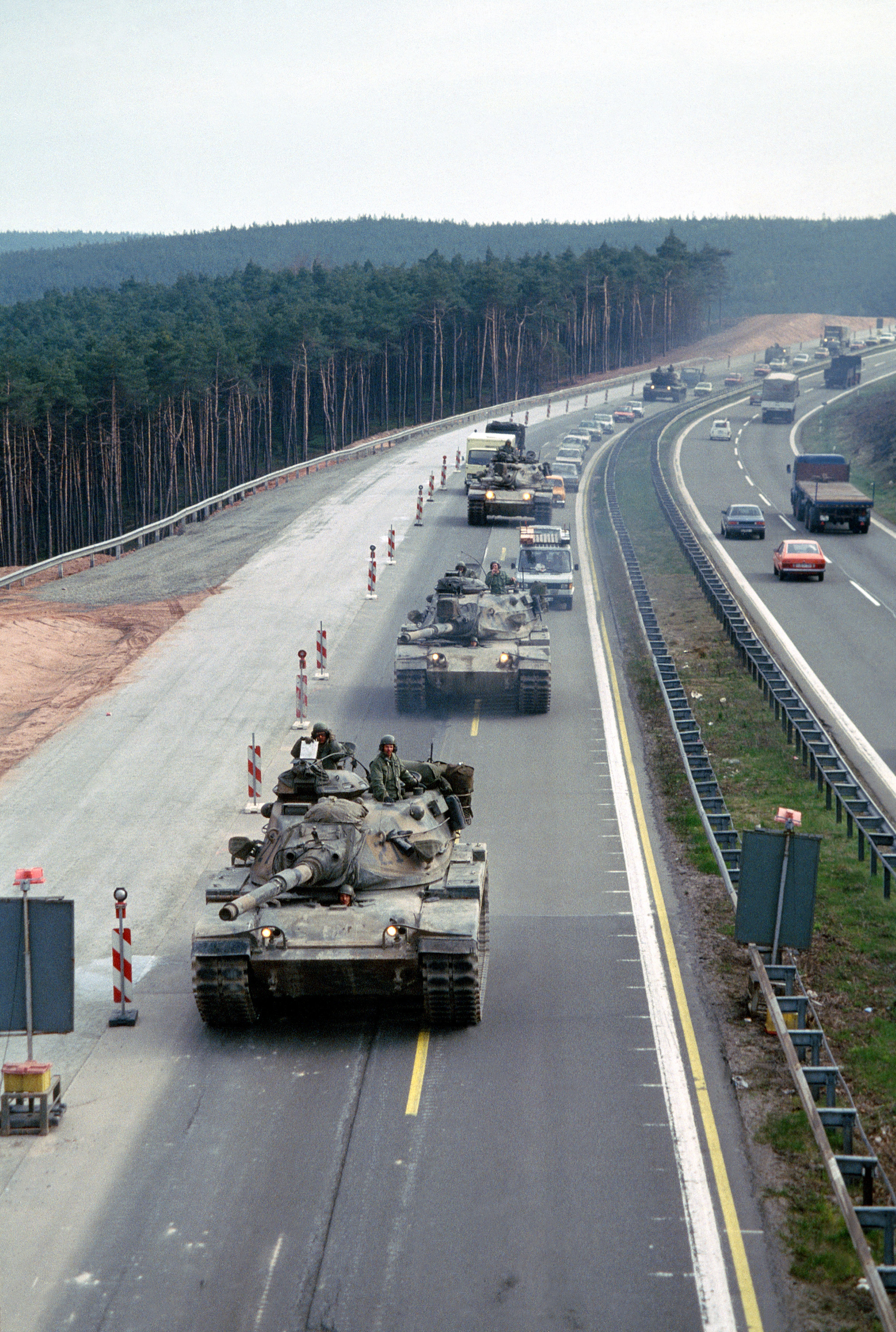
3rd Armored Division M60A3 tanks and armored personnel carriers near the Sembach Air Base exit ramp.

Colin Powell also served in the division. He was assigned to the 2nd Armored Rifle Battalion, 48th Infantry, Combat Command B, Coleman Kaserne, Gelnhausen, between 1958 and 1960. His first Army command assignment was infantry platoon leader. The 3rd Armored's primary mission between May 1956 to July 1992 was, in the event of war, to defend the Fulda Gap alongside other NATO elements and if ordered, use tactical nuclear weapons against numerically superior Warsaw Pact forces. The Division Artillery's (DIVARTY) 333rd Field Artillery Regiment was equipped with MGM-52 Lance surface-to-surface tactical nuclear missiles in case conventional firepower was not enough to stop advancing Warsaw Pact forces if an invasion took place. USAREUR maxed out its Cold War troop strength in June 1962; that number was never achieved again. Also in June 1962, the nuclear warheads for U.S. Davy Crockett devices arrived in Europe (3rd AD combat maneuver battalions were issued Davy Crocketts). In late October 1962, during the Cuban Missile Crisis, Soviet Forces, including those in the Group of Soviet Forces in Germany (GSFG), were placed on the highest alert level, as there was no way to communicate between Washington and Moscow. Two of the five armies in the GSFG were positioned to advance through the Fulda Gap – the 8th Guards Army, containing three motor rifle divisions and one tank division, and 1st Guards Tank Army, containing four tank divisions and one motor rifle division. From 1963 onwards, Reorganization Objective Army Division (ROAD) changes meant organizational changes within the 3rd AD's three combat commands and a name changeover to "brigades" (e.g. Combat Command A became 1st Brigade).

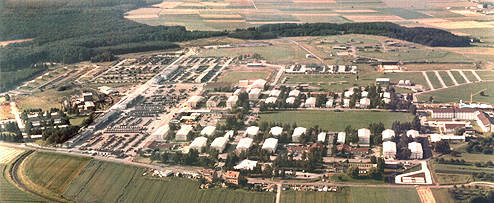
Ayers Kaserne, 1985. Note Motorpools with Tanks, APCs & Artillery

To prepare their soldiers for a potential invasion by the Warsaw Pact, the 3rd Armored Division's units frequently conducted field training, including exercises of live fire, movement and communications, in Bavaria at Hohenfels Training Center, Wildflecken Training Center, and Grafenwöhr Training Center. Throughout its time in Cold War Germany, beginning in mid-1956, the division would also frequently take to the German countryside for training maneuvers, including, beginning in January 1969, what became an annually staged war game called Reforger (REturn of FORces to GERmany), which simulated an invasion of Western Europe by Warsaw Pact forces. (Note: Note: As indicated in the yearly issues during the Vietnam War of Annual Historical Summary – Headquarters United States Army, Europe and Seventh Army, the USAREUR training maneuver budgets dramatically dried up during the Vietnam War years. Significantly reduced training funds were first mentioned in the 1 January to 31 December 1966 edition of the USAREUR Annual Historical Summary.)

Throughout the Cold War, the division headquarters company, the 503rd Administrative Company, 503rd Adjutant General Company, 503 MI Company and 503rd MP Company were based at Drake Kaserne in Frankfurt, with 143rd Signal Battalion and other support units stationed across the street at Edwards Kaserne in Frankfurt, West Germany. A number of its subunits were based in other Kasernes throughout the German state of Hessen, notably Ayers Kaserne (50° 28' 32.44" N 8° 38' 29.24" E) at Kirch-Goens and Schloss Kaserne at Butzbach (CCA/1st Brigade), Gelnhausen (CCB/2d Brigade), Ray Barracks at Friedberg (CCC/3rd Brigade) and Fliegerhorst near Hanau (eventually converted to the division's Aviation Brigade base). The NCO Academy contained two companies: Co. A was assigned to the medieval castle at Usingen-Kransberg, while Co. B was located in Butzbach. The division itself was of comprised an average of 15,000 soldiers organized into three combat commands (CCs) of comparable sizes to the World War II combat commands. These brigades were manned by at least one battalion each of infantry, armor, and artillery, and various supporting units, including medical, engineer, and aviation elements.

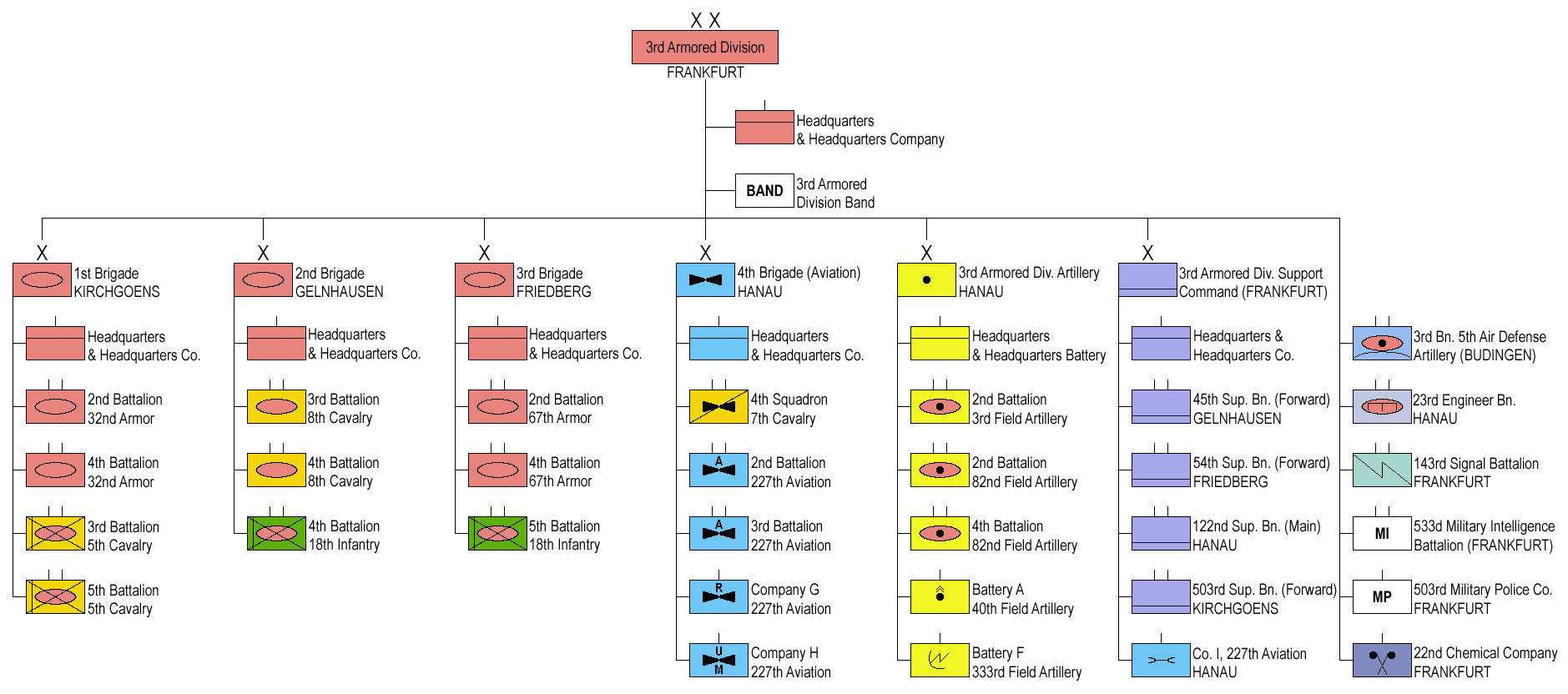
3rd Armored Division structure 1989 (click to enlarge)

The division was also assigned the dedicated 533rd Military Intelligence/CEWI (Combat Electronic Warfare and Intelligence) Battalion by 1980, replacing the 503rd MI Company that previously supported the division intelligence staff.

Most of the kasernes were located adjacent to or within German communities, leading to lively trade and interaction between soldiers and German civilians. A few, however, were somewhat remotely located, particularly Ayers Kaserne ("The Rock")(50° 28' 32.44" N 8° 38' 29.24" E) outside Kirch-Goens, where the 1st Brigade was stationed. As communism in eastern Europe collapsed in the late 1980s, the two German states reunited, and the Soviet Army was beginning to withdraw back to the Soviet Union. With these events, the Cold War came to a peaceful conclusion, freeing U.S. Army units in Europe for other deployments.

Throughout the summer of 1990, in response to the winding down of the Cold War, 3AD was instructed to begin selective standing down of various division elements. Some units, for example the 3rd Battalion, 5th Air Defense Artillery, were turning in equipment and cross-leveling with other 3AD units when momentous events in the Middle East developed in August 1990. That month, Iraq invaded Kuwait, and soon after, President George H. W. Bush committed U.S. troops to the theater, first to defend Saudi Arabia, and then to eject Iraqi troops from Kuwait. Deployment of advance elements of 3AD began in December, with the remaining deploying units arriving by January. Units that had drawn down were replaced or augmented back to full strength. As an example, 3–5 ADA was replaced by the 8th Infantry Division's 5th Battalion, 3rd Air Defense Artillery. Other units were attached to 3AD to bring it up to, and even beyond, full strength.

=== Gulf War ===
==== Deployment and retraining ====
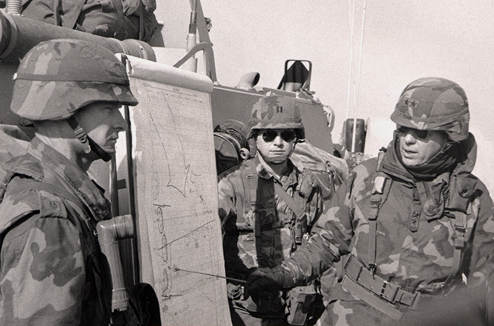
MG Paul Funk reviews plans with Brigade Commanders and Aides – note woodland camouflage

The 3rd Armored Division, then commanded by Major General Paul Funk, was one of four U.S. heavy divisions deployed with VII Corps to the Gulf Region. The division and its equipment were shifted from Germany to Saudi Arabia, with Army National Guard and Army Reserve elements taking over some of their duties in Germany, while in others, kasernes were left virtually empty. This massive deployment was made possible by the end of the Cold War.

After deployment, the division acclimated to the desert climate, and its troops faced new challenges in mobility, tactics and maintenance in a sandy and hot climate. Various National Guard and Army Reserve units were attached to the division for the duration of the conflict, swelling the division's size to over 20,000 troops – 25% larger than during its time in Germany.

The majority of the division's troops never received Desert Battle Dress Uniforms due to equipment shortages, and fought instead in lightweight summer "woodland pattern" uniforms covered by tanker suits or chemical warfare protective MOPP suits.

==== Deployment order of battle ====
Order of battle of the 3rd US Armored Division during Gulf War.

For Desert Storm, the division consisted of:

- 1st Brigade:
  - Headquarters and Headquarters Company (HHC), 1st Brigade
  - 4th Battalion, 32d Armor
  - 3d Battalion, 5th Cavalry
  - 5th Battalion, 5th Cavalry
- 2d Brigade:
  - HHC, 2d Brigade
  - 3d Battalion, 8th Cavalry
  - 4th Battalion, 8th Cavalry
  - 4th Battalion, 18th Infantry
- 3d Brigade:
  - HHC, 3d Brigade
  - 2d Battalion, 67th Armor
  - 4th Battalion, 67th Armor
  - 5th Battalion, 18th Infantry
- Aviation Brigade:
  - HHC, Aviation Brigade
  - 4th Squadron, 7th Cavalry
  - 2d Battalion, 227th Aviation (augmented with Co A, 5–229th AVN just before ground war began)
  - 3d Battalion, 227th Aviation (detached and assigned to XVIII Airborne Corps prior to 3AD deployment)
  - 9th Battalion, 227th Aviation
  - Task Force Viper
- Division Artillery (DIVARTY):
  - Headquarters and Headquarters Battery (HHB), DIVARTY
  - Battery A, 40th Field Artillery
  - Battery F, 333rd Field Artillery
  - 2d Battalion, 3rd Field Artillery
  - 2d Battalion, 82nd Field Artillery
  - 4th Battalion, 82nd Field Artillery
- Division Support Command (DISCOM):
  - HHC, DISCOM
  - 22d Chemical Company
  - 503d Forward Support Battalion
  - 54th Forward Support Battalion
  - 45th Forward Support Battalion
  - 122d Main Support Battalion
- Division Troops:
  - HHC, 3d Armored Division
  - 3d Armored Division Band
  - 503d Military Police Company
  - 23d Engineer Battalion
  - 143d Signal Battalion
  - 533d Military Intelligence Battalion (CEWI)
    - Note: 3d Battalion, 5th Air Defense Artillery had inactivated and did not deploy to Desert Shield/Storm
- Attached Units:
  - 4th Battalion, 34th Armor (from 8th ID (M))
  - 5th Battalion, 3d Air Defense Artillery (from 8th ID (M))
  - 3rd Battalion, 20th Field Artillery
  - 2d Battalion, 29th Field Artillery (from 8th ID (M))
  - 12th Engineer Battalion (from 8th ID (M))
  - 302d RAOC
  - 323d Chemical Company
  - 148th Public Affairs Detachment, IDARNG
  - 369th Personnel Service Company
  - Company C, 17th Signal Battalion
  - 43d Ordnance Detachment (EOD)

==== Into battle ====
After months of training, the division moved to the line of departure, with the 1st Armored Division on its left flank and the 2nd Armored Cavalry Regiment on its right flank. While the Iraqi Army concentrated much of its defenses in and around Kuwait itself, the 3rd AD and VII Corps launched a massive armored attack into Iraq, just to the west of Kuwait, taking the Iraqis completely by surprise.

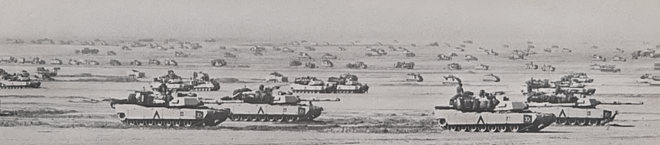
A 3rd AD Brigade along the line of departure

Scouts from 2nd Brigade crossed the border on the afternoon of 23 February 1991 just after 1500 hours. Less than two hours later, they had penetrated several miles into Iraq and managed to capture over 200 prisoners. On 24 February, the official first day of action, the division as a whole swung into action as part of a coordinated attack by hundreds of thousands of Coalition troops. By dawn on the second day, an additional 50 prisoners had been taken, with scouts reporting enemy reinforcements moving to meet the division.

==== Second day ====
At 1115 hours on the second day of the invasion, all elements of the division finally moved across the line of departure. The day was marked by hard pushing to penetrate deep and fast for an objective south of Basra. In the course of its drive, various elements of 3AD engaged the enemy, taking prisoners, skirmishing, sometimes bypassing enemy strongholds to gain ground, and other times engaging in full-scale battle.

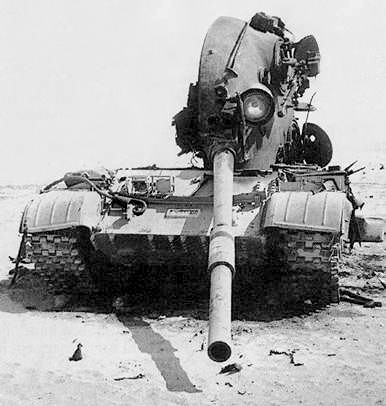
Iraqi Tank knocked out by 3rd AD fire

By nightfall of the second day, 3AD had driven 53 miles into Iraq, with dozens of enemy vehicles destroyed, hundreds of POWs captured, and was on the verge of achieving its first objective – an accomplishment that war planners had not anticipated.

==== Third day ====
On the third day of combat, 26 February, the division closed in on its objective and faced for the first time the Iraqi Republican Guard, a much stronger foe than the conscripts the division had first engaged, and less inclined to retreat or surrender. Opposing forces included the highly touted Republican Guard "Tawakalna" Division, the Iraqi 52nd Armored Division and elements of the 17th and the 10th Armored Divisions. The division engaged in full scale tank battles for the first time since World War II, with one of the division's veterans stating "there was more than enough action for everyone".

Action continued after nightfall, and by 1840 hours, the ground and air elements of the 3rd AD reported over 20 tanks, 14 APCs, several trucks and some artillery pieces destroyed. That same evening, the 4th Battalion, 32nd Armor lost the division's first casualties, with two soldiers killed and three wounded to 25mm cannon fire and the Bradley Fighting Vehicle they were in destroyed. During the night, both darkness and sandstorms hampered soldiers' visibility, but thermal sighting systems onboard the M1A1 Abrams tanks and Bradleys allowed gunners to continue to knock out Iraqi targets.

==== Fourth and fifth days ====
By the fourth day, the division had reached its objective and was pursuing its now retreating enemy. The division turned east into Kuwait, continuing to inflict heavy casualties and capture troops as it rolled forward, often hitting Iraqi units whose defensive berms and foxholes faced south from their northern flank, rendering their defenses ineffective. By nightfall, forces facing 3AD had been virtually eliminated, with their remnants in full retreat.

By the fifth day of combat, 28 February, the division had achieved all of its original objectives. It had cleared Objective Dorset after meeting stiff resistance and destroying more than 300 enemy vehicles. The 3rd Brigade, 3AD had also captured 2,500 enemy prisoners. The division was now pushing east to block the Iraqi retreat from Kuwait and conduct mopping up operations. Less than one hundred hours after the ground campaign started, President Bush declared a ceasefire.

==== Gulf War legacy ====
Click for visual of 3AD movement during Gulf War

At the height of the war, the 3rd Armored Division commanded 32 battalions and 20,533 personnel. The 3rd Armored Division was the largest coalition division in the Gulf War and the largest U.S. armored division in history. In its arsenal were 360 Abrams main battle tanks, 340 Bradley Fighting Vehicles, 128 self-propelled 155 mm howitzers, 27 Apache attack helicopters, 9 multiple-launch rocket systems, and additional equipment.

The 3rd AD served at the Battle of 73 Easting and the Battle of Norfolk. Only three of its M1A1 Abrams tanks were damaged during combat operations. The 3rd Armored Division suffered 15 soldiers killed between December 1990 and late February 1991. Seven soldiers were killed in action and another 27 were wounded during combat operations.

In 1991, Division Historian Dan Peterson, comparing the performance of the division in World War II and Desert Storm, stated, "History does always repeat itself. 3rd Armored Division was the Spearhead in both wars."

Following the war, 3rd Armored Division was one of the first units rotated to Camp Doha, Kuwait, providing protection to Kuwait as the country was rebuilt.

=== Inactivation ===
Following Desert Storm, a number of the division's units were transferred to the 1st Armored Division.

On 17 January 1992, the 3rd Armored Division officially ceased operations in Germany with a ceremony held in Frankfurt at Division Headquarters Drake Kaserne.

"Sir, this is my final salute. Mission accomplished," said Maj. Gen. Jerry Rutherford, the division commander. Rutherford preceded the final salute to General Crosbie E. Saint, USAREUR Commander, with a loudly shouted "Spearhead!". The division colors were then returned to the United States with the 3rd AD still officially active, since Army regulations state that a Divisional "Casing of the Colors" cannot occur on foreign soil.

Official Inactivation took place at Fort Knox, on 17 October 1992. In attendance at the ceremony were several former Spearhead commanding generals and division veterans from all eras. In a traditional ceremony, Command Sgt. Major Richard L. Ross, holding the division color with battle streamers, passed it to General Frederick M. Franks, Jr., completing the official inactivation of the division. With this ceremony, the 3rd Armored Division was removed from the active duty force structure of the U.S. Army.

==== Reassignment ====
With the end of the Cold War, several of the division's overseas Kasernes were transferred to other units, particularly the 1st Armored Division. Over time, many were closed, fell into disrepair, or were demolished. Some 3rd Armored units were transferred to the 1st Armored, notably the 2nd Battalion, 3rd Field Artillery, later portrayed in Gunner Palace.

The 1st Battalion, 32nd Armor was reflagged and is now stationed at Fort Campbell, Kentucky as part of the 101st Airborne Division (Air Assault). The unit was reorganized as the 1st Squadron, 32nd Cavalry Regiment, and is assigned to the 1st Brigade Combat Team of the 101st Airborne Division (Air Assault) as its organic reconnaissance, surveillance, and target acquisition (RSTA) element. The 1st Battalion, 33rd Armor was also reflagged and stationed at Fort Campbell with the 101st Airborne Division (Air Assault) as the 1st Squadron, 33rd Cavalry Regiment, and is assigned to the Division's 3rd Brigade Combat Team. The 4th Squadron, 7th Cavalry later became part of 1st Brigade, 2nd Infantry Division. It was inactivated on 2 July 2015.

The following 3AD units were assigned to the 1st Cavalry Division:

- 1st Battalion, 5th Cavalry
- 2nd Battalion, 5th Cavalry
- 3rd Battalion, 8th Cavalry
- 2nd Battalion, 82nd Field Artillery
- 2nd Battalion, 227th Aviation
- 3rd Battalion, 227th Aviation

Additionally, the 122nd Support Battalion (Main) from the Division Support Command was reactivated at Fort Bragg and assigned to the Combat Aviation Brigade, 82nd Airborne Division as the 122nd Support Battalion (Aviation). The 54th Support Battalion (Main) was reactivated on 16 September 1994 as the 54th Support Battalion (Base) of the 80th Support Group (Area).

== Commanders ==
The 3rd Armored Division had thirty-nine commanders over the course of its history, many of whom went on to obtain four star rank.

- MG Alvan Cullom Gillem Jr. (April 1941 – January 1942)
- MG Walton Harris Walker (January 1942 – August 1942)
- MG Leroy H. Watson (August 1942 – August 1944)
- MG Maurice Rose † (August 1944 – March 1945)
- BG Doyle O. Hickey (March 1945 – June 1945)
- BG Truman E. Boudinot (June 1945 – July 1945)
- BG Frank A. Allen Jr. (July 1945)
- MG Robert W. Grow (July 1945 – November 1945)
- MG Ray T. Maddocks (July 1947 – April 1948)
- MG Roderick R. Allen (April 1948 – June 1950)
- BG Raymond E. S. Williamson (June 1950 – February 1951)
- MG Ira Platt Swift (February 1951 – July 1951)
- BG Arthur R. Walk (July 1951 – October 1951)
- BG Raymond E. S. Williamson (October 1951 – November 1952)
- BG John T. Cole (November 1952 – December 1952)
- MG Richard W. Stevens (December 1952 – January 1954)
- MG Gordon Byrom Rogers (January 1954 – April 1955)
- MG John Murphy Willems (April 1955 – July 1956)
- MG Robert W. Porter Jr. (July 1956 – January 1958)
- MG Thomas F. Van Natta III (January 1958 – July 1959)
- MG Frederic J. Brown II (July 1959 – October 1960)
- MG Creighton Abrams (October 1960 – May 1962)
- MG John R. Pugh (May 1962 – February 1964)
- MG Berton E. Spivy Jr. (February 1964 – March 1965)
- MG Walter T. Kerwin Jr. (March 1965 – October 1966)
- MG Welborn G. Dolvin (October 1966 – April 1968)
- MG Donald H. Cowles (April 1968 – August 1969)
- MG Morgan G. Roseborough (August 1969 – May 1971)
- MG William R. Kraft Jr. (May 1971 – March 1973)
- MG Jonathan R. Burton (March 1973 – June 1975)
- MG Charles J. Simmons (June 1975 – November 1977)
- MG Wallace H. Nutting (November 1977 – September 1979)
- MG Walter F. Ulmer Jr. (September 1979 – February 1982)
- MG Thurman Anderson (February 1982 – March 1984)
- MG Richard G. Graves (March 1984 – June 1986)
- MG Thomas N. Griffin Jr. (June 1986 – March 1988)
- MG George Joulwan (March 1988 – July 1989)
- MG Paul E. Funk (July 1989 – April 1991)
- MG Jerry R. Rutherford (April 1991 – February 1992)

== In popular culture ==
Books, movies and other media that feature the Third Armored Division include:

- The Tanks Are Coming (1951) – A typical World War II action movie of the time, based loosely on actual events
- G.I. Blues (1960) – Elvis Presley, a real life 3AD veteran who served as a Scout/Recon (rode in a jeep), stars as a 3rd AD Tanker with an off-post singing career and dreams of owning a nightclub
- Rat Patrol (1966) An episode set in North Africa shows the Head Quarters marked 3rd Armored Infantry.
- Cooper, Belton Y. (1998). Death Traps: The Survival of an American Armored Division in World War II. Navato, CA: Presidio Press. ISBN 0-89141-670-6. OCLC 38753044. A unique look at the war from a maintenance officer's perspective.
- Rolling Thunder: The True Story of the Third Armored Division (2002) – A History Channel documentary detailing the history of the division from birth to the 1990s.
- Man, Moment, Machine (season 1, episode 4): "Stormin' Norman and the Abrams Tank" – Featuring footage of the 3rd AD in the Gulf War, and interviews with 3AD tankers.
- The Walk (The X-Files) – In the seventh episode of the third season, General Thomas Callahan (played by Thomas Kopache) wears the insignia of the 3rd AD on his Class A uniform.
- Task Force Hogan – a detailed look at Spearhead's 3rd Battalion, 33rd Armored Regiment during WWII from Normandy to the Elbe. Published November 2023.
- Warno (video game) features the 3rd Armored Division fighting on the central front of a hypothetical Cold War gone hot war scenario.
