= General Andersen =

General Andersen may refer to:

- James Roy Andersen (1904–1945), U.S. Army Air Forces brigadier general
- Kurt Andersen (general) (1898–2003), Nazi Germany Luftwaffe general
- Roy Andersen (South Africa) (born 1948) South African Army major general

== See also ==
- General Anderson (disambiguation)
