= Doyle Overton Hickey =

United States Army general

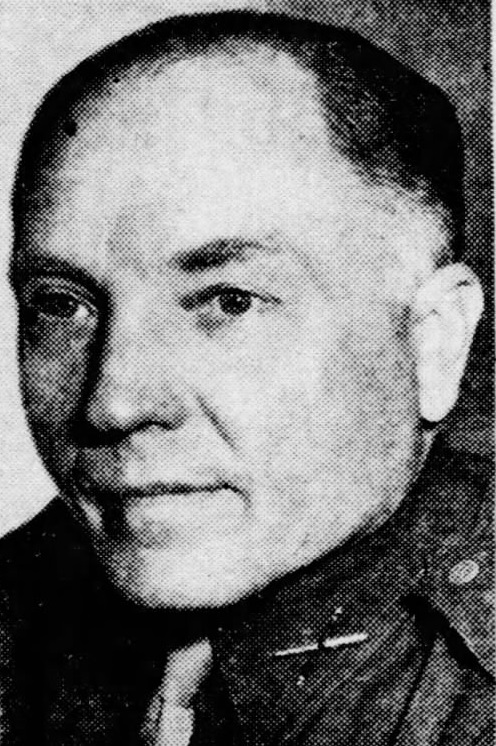
- Louisville Courier-Journal, July 11, 1947
- Born: July 11, 1892; Rector, Arkansas
- Died: October 20, 1961 (aged 69); Jefferson, Louisiana
- Burial place: Live Oak Cemetery, Pass Christian, Mississippi
- Military career
- Allegiance: United States
- Branch: United States Army
- Service years: 1913–1953
- Rank: Lieutenant General
- Service number: 0-10123
- Units: 31st Infantry Division; 7th Field Artillery Regiment
- Commands: 9th Infantry Regiment; 3rd Armored Division
- Conflicts: World War I: Western Front; World War II: Battle of Hurtgen Forest; Battle of the Bulge; Invasion of Germany; Korean War
- Awards: Army Distinguished Service Medal; Silver Star (4); Legion of Merit; Bronze Star
- Other work: Executive, Continental Motors Corporation

Doyle Overton Hickey (July 27, 1892 – October 20, 1961) was an officer in the United States Army who served in World War I, World War II and the Korean War, finishing his military career as a lieutenant general.

== Early life ==
Hickey was born in Rector, Arkansas, on July 27, 1892, the son of John B. and Genie (Crews) Hickey. Hickey was educated in Camden, and graduated from Camden High School in 1909. He was a 1913 graduate of Hendrix College, after which he studied law with a local attorney. Hickey worked at a Memphis, Tennessee, lumber company until deciding to enlist for World War I.

== World War I ==
He joined the Army, attended Officer Candidate School at Leon Springs, Texas, and in 1917 was commissioned as a second lieutenant in the Artillery. Hickey was assigned to the 31st Infantry Division and served in France until the end of the war.

== Post-World War I ==
After the war, Hickey continued his Army career, attending the Field Artillery School at Fort Sill, Oklahoma and graduating from the Command and General Staff College at Fort Leavenworth, Kansas, in 1936. In the early 1930s, he served with the 7th Field Artillery Regiment at Madison Barracks, New York, afterwards being assigned to duty as Director of the United States Park Police in Washington, D.C. From 1938 to 1940, he served in the Philippines, and from 1940 to 1941 he commanded the 9th Infantry Regiment at Fort Bragg, North Carolina. In 1941, he was assigned as executive officer of the Field Artillery Replacement Center.

== World War II ==
In 1942, Hickey joined the 3rd Armored Division during its World War II training in southern California, assuming command of Combat Command A and receiving promotion to brigadier general. He assumed command of 3rd Armored Division after the death of Major General Maurice Rose in March 1945, and was promoted to major general. The 3rd Armored had taken part in combat during the Battle of Hurtgen Forest and the Battle of the Bulge, and after Hickey assumed command the division continued to fight, taking the city of Cologne in March and crossing the Saale River. On April 11, the 3rd Armored discovered the Dora-Mittelbau concentration camp.

After World War II, the division carried out occupation duty near Langen, and was inactivated in November 1945. Hickey then served as Chief of the Research and Development Division for Headquarters, Army Ground Forces, in Washington, D.C.

== Korean War ==
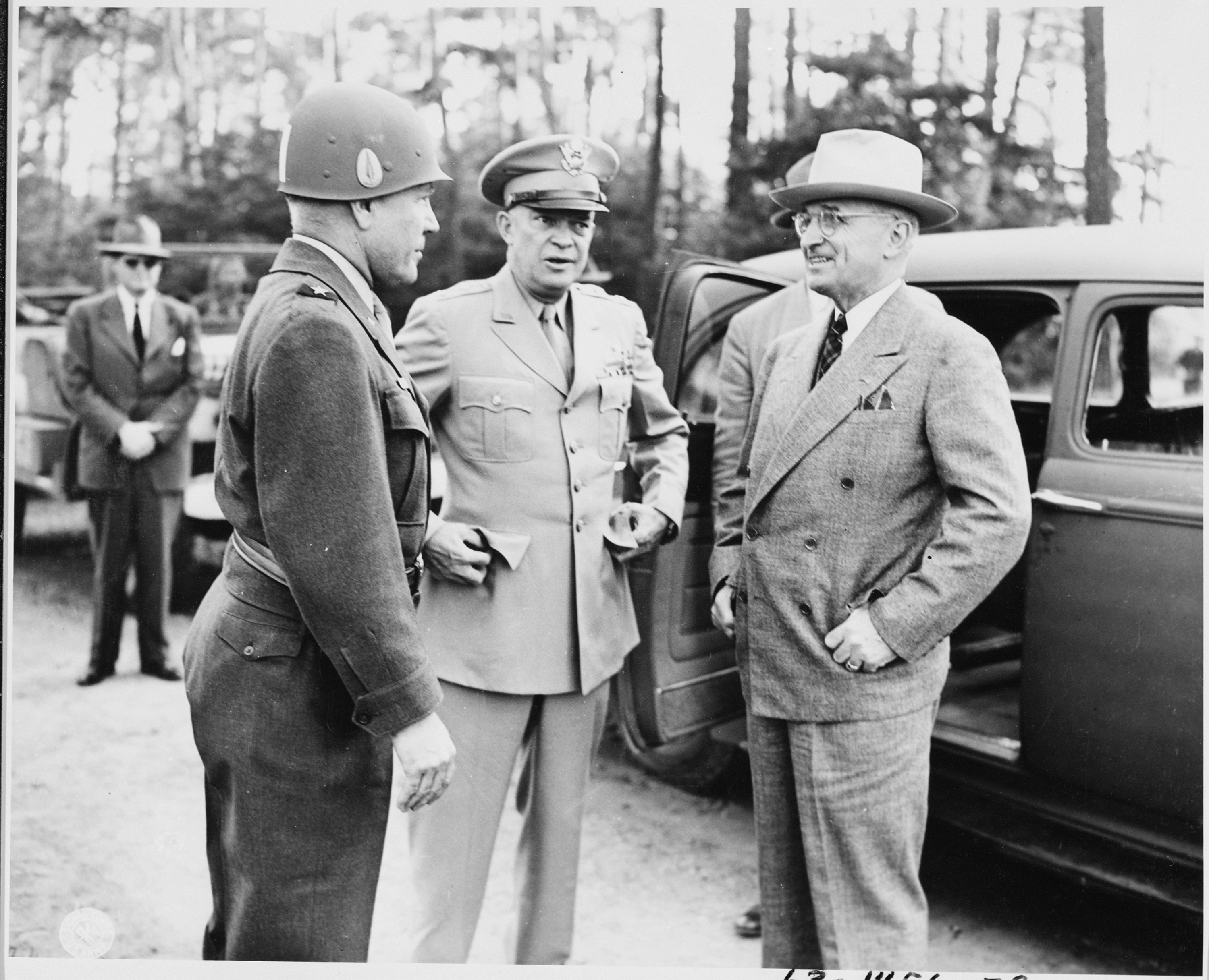
Hickey, Dwight Eisenhower, and Harry Truman.

Hickey served as deputy chief of staff and the de facto chief for the Far East Command in Tokyo during Douglas MacArthur's command. In 1951, Hickey was officially assigned as chief of staff, receiving promotion to lieutenant general. He served under MacArthur's successors, Matthew Ridgway and Mark Clark, and played an important role in the planning and execution of operations during the Korean War.

== Awards ==
General Hickey's decorations included two awards of the Distinguished Service Medal, four of the Silver Star, the Legion of Merit and the Bronze Star.

== Later career ==
General Hickey retired from the military in 1953, and became an executive with the Continental Motors Corporation. In his later years, he resided in Pass Christian, Mississippi.

== Death and burial ==
Hickey died at Ochsner Foundation Hospital in Jefferson, Louisiana, on October 20, 1961. He was buried at Live Oak Cemetery in Pass Christian.

== Family ==
On April 30, 1917, Hickey married Sophronia Purdue Brown of Indianola, Mississippi. They had no children.

== Sources ==
=== Books ===
- Derby, George; White, James Terry (1968). The National Cyclopedia of American Biography. Vol. 50. New York, NY: J. T. White and Company.
- Marshall, George Catlett; Stoler, Mark A. (2016). The Papers of George Catlett Marshall. Vol. 7. Baltimore, MD: Johns Hopkins University Press. ISBN 978-1-4214-1962-6.
- Ossad, Stephen L.; Marsh, Don R. (2003). Major General Maurice Rose: World War II's Greatest Forgotten Commander. Lanham, MD: Taylor Trade Publishing. ISBN 978-0-87833-308-0.
- Society of Automotive Engineers (1956). The SAE Journal. Vol. 64, Part 1. Troy, MI: SAE International.
- Woolner, Frank; Fowler, Murray H. (1945). Spearhead in the West, 1941-45: The Third Armored Division. Vol. 3, Part 4. Sangerhausen, Germany: U.S. 3rd Armored Division.

=== Newspapers ===
- "Gen. Hickey Services Held". The Enterprise-Tocsin. Indianola, MS. October 26, 1961 – via Newspapers.com.

== Additional sources ==
- Normandy to victory: the war diary of General Courtney H. Hodges and the First U.S. Army, William C. Sylvan and John T. Greenwood, edited by John T. Greenwood, 2008, end note 58, page 409
- U.S. Army Register, published by U.S. Army Adjutant General's Office, 1922 page 600
- Newspaper article, Captain Hickey Transferred, Syracuse Herald, April 6, 1932
- Hearing Record, District of Columbia Appropriations, United States House of Representatives Committee on Appropriations, 1933, page 57
- Spearhead in the West, 1941-45: the Third Armored Division, Frank Woolner, Murray H. Fowler, 1945, pages 6 to 8
- Military Affairs: Journal of the American Military Institute, 1945, Volumes 9 to 11, page 36
- A Dark and Bloody ground: the Hurtgen Forest and the Roer River Dams, 1944–1945, Edward G. Miller, 1995, page 214
- US Armored Divisions: the European Theater of Operations, 1944–45, Steven J. Zaloga, 2004, page 78
- Battle of the Ruhr Pocket, Charles Whiting, 1971, page 66
- Newspaper article, General Hickey Named Deputy Chief of Staff, Pacific Stars and Stripes, February 17, 1949
- Newspaper article, General Hickey to Retire After 35 Years in Army, New York Times, March 27, 1953
- The Korean War: a Historical Dictionary, Paul M. Edwards, 2003, page 102
- Encyclopedia of the Korean War: a Political, Social, and Military History, Spencer Tucker, Jinwung Kim, 2000, Volume 3, page 247
- Military Times, Hall of Heroes, Index of Recipients of Major Military Awards, https://web.archive.org/web/20100103174921/http://homeofheroes.com/verify/recipients_he.html
- Newspaper article, Clark Adds Cluster to Hickey's DSM at Farewell Rites, Pacific Stars and Stripes, April 30, 1953
- Skyways for Business, National Business Aircraft Association, 1955, page 5
- Newspaper article, General Hickey, Army Commander: Aide to MacArthur Dies—Led 3d Armored Division, New York Times, October 21, 1961
- Newspaper article, Obituary, D.O. Hickey, Delta (Mississippi) Democrat-Times, October 22, 1961
- Generals of World War II
