= Jerry R. Rutherford =

United States Army general

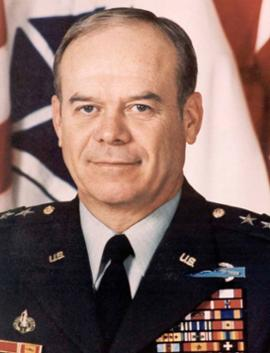
- Lieutenant General Jerry R. Rutherford
- Military career
- Allegiance: United States of America
- Branch: United States Army
- Service years: 1962–1995
- Rank: Lieutenant General
- Commands: Commander, V Corps
- Awards: Distinguished Service Medal; Legion of Merit; Bronze Star; Knight Commander's Cross (Germany)

Jerry Rex Rutherford retired as a Lieutenant General in the United States Army, where he served as Commander of V Corps.

== Early life ==
Jerry Rutherford is a native of Joplin, Missouri. He graduated from Pittsburg State University in 1962 with a BA in Journalism. While at Pittsburg State, Rutherford also joined Tau Kappa Epsilon.

== Military career ==
After graduation, Rutherford was commissioned as a second lieutenant in the United States Army.

Rutherford was promoted to brigadier general in 1988, while serving as assistant division commander of the 1st Infantry Division (Mechanized) at Fort Riley, Kansas. From 1989 to 1991 he served as commander of the 2d Armored Division (Forward) of the United States Army Europe and Seventh Army, Germany. In 1991 he served as assistant division commander (support) of 1st Infantry Division (Mechanized) in Saudi Arabia during Operation Desert Storm.

Rutherford was promoted to major general in September 1991, and at that time he served as commanding general of the 3d Armored Division, United States Army Europe and Seventh Army, Germany. In 1992 he took on the role of deputy commander of V Corps, and in July 1992 he was promoted to lieutenant general and commander of V Corps. Rutherford retired in May 1995. While commander of V Corps, LTG Rutherford was considered by his subordinates to be thorough, fair and considerate. LTG Rutherford was known for his compassion and his propensity to procure a better life for the common soldier. LTG Rutherford worked tirelessly to ensure that his soldiers and their families were prepared for any eventuality. LTG Rutherford always considered his troops to be the best on the planet, and he would never let them forget his expectations. He always called his troops his "Tigers".

== Post military career ==
After retiring from the U.S. Army, Rutherford served as Vice President of Right Management, a talent and career management solutions provider, from 1996 to 1998. He is currently the Chief Operating Officer at Spencer Fane Britt & Browne LLP law firm in Kansas City, Missouri.

Rutherford serves on the Board of Governors for the Liberty Memorial Association and on the executive committee for expansion of the National World War I Museum at Liberty Memorial.
