= 2nd Battalion, 227th Aviation Regiment =

The 2nd Battalion, 227th Aviation Regiment, is a battalion of the United States Army. It flies the Sikorsky UH-60 Black Hawk and the Boeing CH-47 Chinook helicopters. It provides aerial C3 support, limited air assault, aeromedical evacuation and air movement for the 1st Cavalry Division.

== History ==
The battalion was originally constituted on 1 February 1963 in the Regular Army as Bravo Company, 227th Assault Helicopter Battalion which was assigned to the 11th Air Assault Division. It was activated on 11 February 1963 at Fort Benning, Georgia.

On 1 July 1965, the unit was recognized and redesignated as Bravo Company, 227th Aviation Battalion. Concurrently, it was relieved from assignment to the 11th Air Assault Division and assigned to the 1st Cavalry Division. The unit served with great distinction for the next six years in Vietnam, where it was awarded the Presidential Unit Citation (2 awards), the Valorous Unit Award (3 awards), the Meritorious Unit Commendation, the Republic of Vietnam Cross of Gallantry with Palm (3 awards) and the Republic of Vietnam Civil Action Honor Medal, First Class.

The Unit was inactivated on 19 November 1974 at Fort Hood, Texas. On 21 May 1978, Bravo Company, 227th Aviation Battalion was reactivated at Fort Hood, Texas until its inactivation, on 30 September 1983.

On 16 July 1987, the unit was redesignated as Headquarters and Headquarters Company, 2nd Battalion, 227th Aviation Regiment. The unit was relieved from assignment with the 1st Cavalry Division and reassigned to the 3rd Armored Division in Germany where it was activated. The unit served in its present location in Hanau, Germany until its inactivation on 26 June 1989.

In September 1989 at Fort Hood, Texas, 2nd Battalion, 227th Aviation began its reconstitution as part of the Apache Training Brigade. On 17 March 1990, 2nd Battalion, 227th Aviation Regiment was activated at Fort Hood, Texas. On 17 July 1990, the battalion deployed as a unit to its current home of Hanau, Germany, where it was again assigned to the 3rd Armored Division.

On 28 December 1990, the 2nd Battalion deployed as a unit to Saudi Arabia as part of operations Desert Shield and Desert Storm. The battalion flew numerous combat missions during the campaign, and was instrumental in the success of 3rd Armored Division's attack on Kuwait. The battalion served with great distinction in South West Asia, until its redeployment to Germany on 17 May 1991 ending the unit's most recent participation in combat.

In the fall of 1991, 2nd Battalion, 227th Aviation Battalion was relieved of its assignment to 3rd Armored Division and reassigned to 4th Brigade, 1st Armored Division under the operational control of the 4th Brigade under which 2nd Battalion, 227th Aviation Regiment served.

On 15 February 1997, 2nd Battalion, 227th Aviation Regiment was again relieved of its assignment to the 1st Armored Division and reassigned to the 4th Brigade 1st Cavalry Division.

Recently, the 2nd Battalion, 227th Aviation Regiment logged over 4400 hours in the Balkans in support of Stabilization Force 4. Missions performed ranged from multi-national general support and airborne command & control, to air movement operations. At Fort Hood, 2nd Battalion, 227th Aviation Regiment provides general aviation support to the 1st Cavalry Division and conducts aerial fire fighting operations to support the local communities. In recognition of their performance in 1999, 2nd Battalion, 227th Aviation Regiment was selected as the Army Aviation Association of America's Aviation Unit of the Year.

After the devastation caused by Hurricane Katrina in September 2005, the Brigade deployed 2nd Battalion, 227th Aviation and the brigade command team to Louisiana to support disaster relief operations in New Orleans. Immediately upon redeployment, 2-227 AVN and the brigade command team redeployed to East Texas to assist relief efforts in the wake of Hurricane Rita. Shortly after returning from the hurricane relief effort, the 2nd Battalion, 227th Aviation Regiment and elements of the 615th Aviation Support Battalion were called upon to support a humanitarian aid mission in the aftermath of the October 2005 earthquake that devastated northern Pakistan.

== Structure ==
- Headquarters and Headquarters Company
- Alpha Company (UH-60L)
- Bravo Company (CH-47F)
- Charlie Company (HH-60M)
- Delta Company (Aviation Maintenance)
- Echo Company (Forward Support)
- Foxtrot Company (ATC)
