= 227th Aviation Regiment =

- Country: United States
- Branch: United States Army Aviation Branch
- Type: Aviation

227th Aviation Regiment is an aviation regiment of the United States Army, mostly associated with the 1st Cavalry Division.

Company A, 227th Assault Helicopter Battalion, was constituted on 1 February 1963 in the Regular Army, as an element of the 11th Air Assault Division. It was activated the same day at Fort Benning, Georgia. It was reorganized and redesignated on 1 July 1965 as Company A, 227th Aviation Battalion, an element of the 1st Cavalry Division.

It was inactivated in 1974, activated again in 1978, and again inactivated in 1983. It was then redesignated 16 July 1987 as Headquarters and Headquarters Company, 1st Battalion, 227th Aviation, and activated at Fort Hood, Texas (organic elements concurrently constituted and activated).

== Structure ==
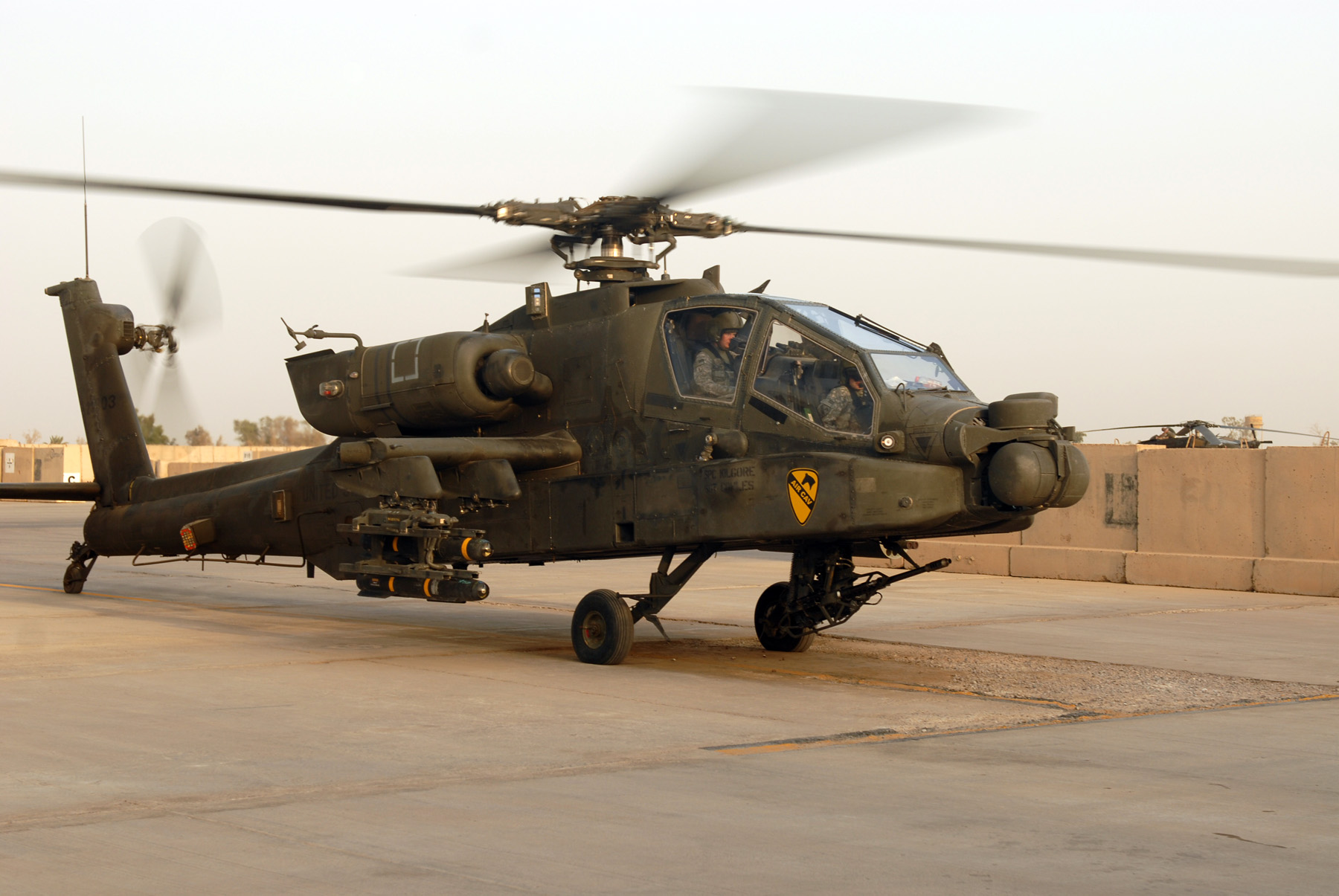
AH-64D from Company B, 4th Attack Reconnaissance Battalion, 227th Aviation Regiment

- 1st Battalion "Attack"
- 2nd Battalion "Lobos"
  - Company C "DUSTOFF" (UH-60)
- 3rd Battalion "SpearHead"
