= 33rd Armor Regiment =

33rd Armor Regiment 33rd Cavalry Regiment
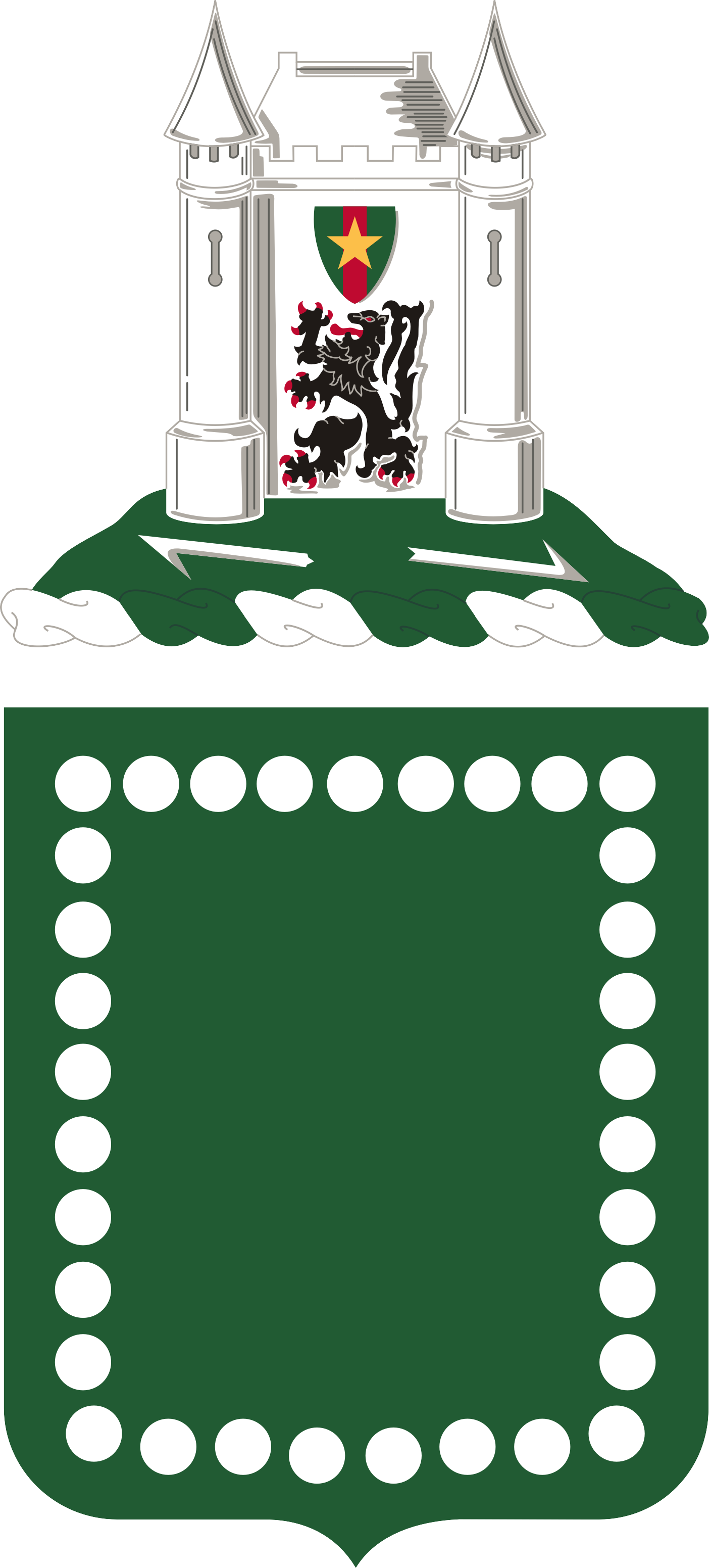
- Coat of arms
- Active: 1941–45; 1947–Present
- Country: United States
- Type: Light Cavalry
- Motto: "Men of war"
- Engagements: World War II; Iraq War

Commanders
- Commander: LTC Ruben Otero
- Command Sergeant Major: CSM Steven Denzer

Insignia
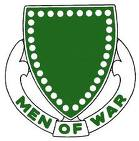
- Distinctive unit insignia

- 1st Squadron Background Trimming

The 33rd Armor Regiment was an armored regiment in the United States Army first formed in 1941. In 2005, the 33rd Armor was redesignated 33rd Cavalry Regiment. The 1st Squadron, 33rd Cavalry Regiment, a part of the 3rd Brigade Combat Team, 101st Airborne Division, carries on the lineage of 33rd Armor Regiment.

== Lineage ==
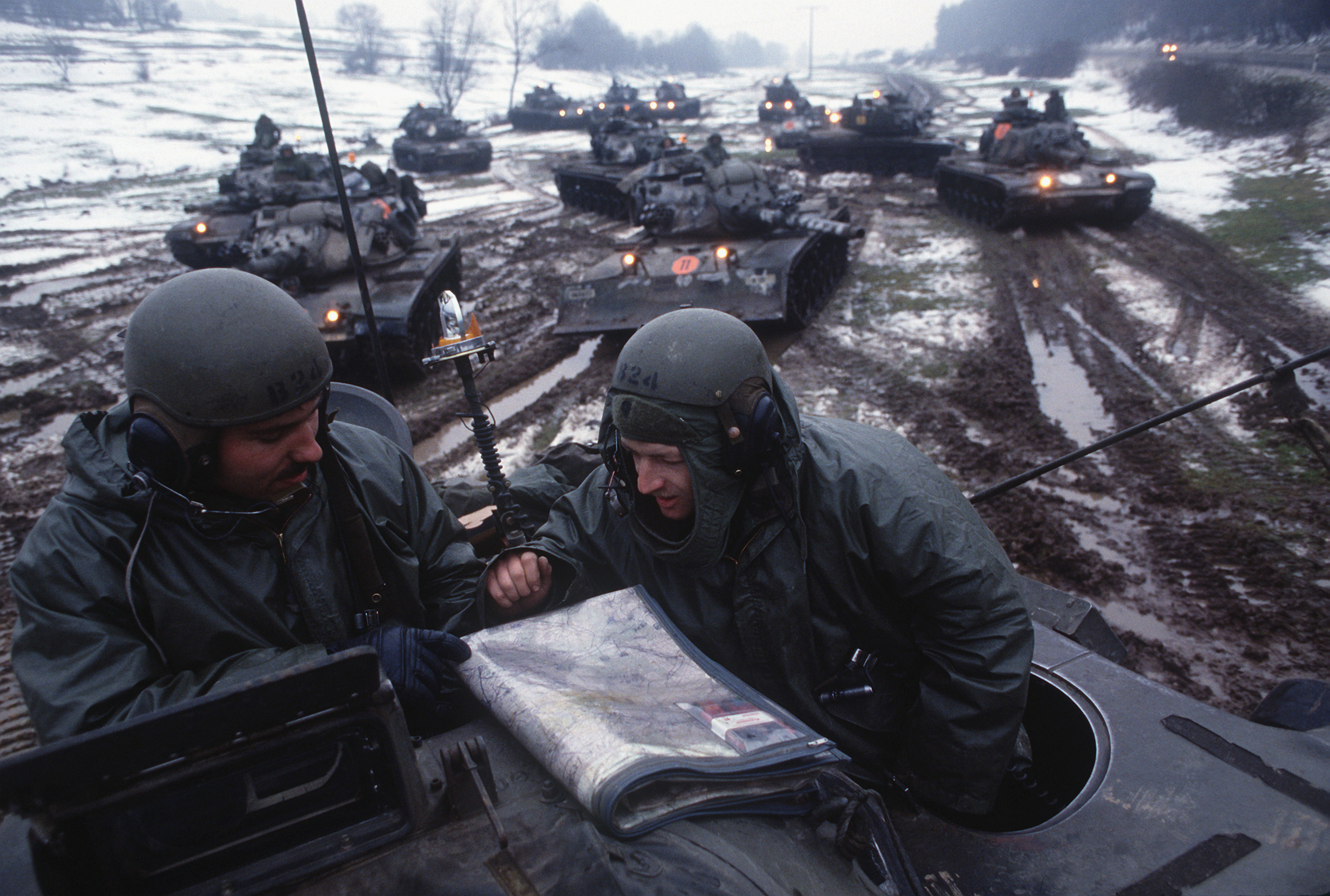
Crewmen of an M60A3 main battle tank discuss the results of a field training exercise during Central Guardian, a phase of Exercise REFORGER '85 near Büßfeld, Homberg (Ohm), West Germany. Other M60A3 tanks of Company B, 2nd Battalion, 33rd Armor, are in the background.

Constituted 13 January 1941 in the Regular Army as the 3rd Armored Regiment and assigned to the 3rd Armored Division.

Activated 15 April 1941 at Camp Beauregard, Louisiana.

Redesignated 8 May 1941 as the 33rd Armored Regiment.

Inactivated 10 November 1945 in Germany.

Regiment broken up 7 July 1947 and its elements redesignated as follows:

- Regimental Headquarters and Headquarters Company, Headquarters and Headquarters Company, 1st Battalion, and Companies A, D, E, and F as the 33rd Tank Battalion, and remained assigned to the 3rd Armored Division.
- Headquarters and Headquarters Company, 3rd Battalion, and Companies G and H as the Service Company and Companies B and C, respectively, 7th Tank Battalion, and remained assigned to the 3rd Armored Division (remainder of the 7th Tank Battalion organized from elements of the 32nd Armored Regiment).
- Headquarters and Headquarters Company, 2nd Battalion, Companies B, C, and I, Service and Maintenance Companies, and Band disbanded.
- (Reconnaissance Company as Troop E, 83rd Mechanized Cavalry Reconnaissance Squadron—hereafter separate lineage).

After 7 July 1947 the above units underwent changes as follows:

- 7th and 33rd Tank Battalions activated 15 July 1947 at Fort Knox, Kentucky. Reorganized and redesignated 30 July 1948 as the 7th and 33rd Medium Tank Battalions, respectively. Reorganized and redesignated 15 March 1955 as the 7th and 33rd Tank Battalions, respectively. 7th and 33rd (less Company D) Tank Battalions inactivated 1 October 1957 in Germany and relieved from assignment to the 3rd Armored Division.
- Headquarters and Headquarters Company, 2nd Battalion; Service Company; and Companies B, C, and I, 33rd Armored Regiment, reconstituted 28 May 1948 in the Regular Army as Headquarters, Headquarters and Service Company, and Companies B, C, and A, respectively, 62nd Heavy Tank Battalion. 62nd Heavy Tank Battalion assigned 18 June 1948 to the 10th Infantry Division. Activated 1 July 1948 at Fort Riley, Kansas. Reorganized and redesignated 15 June 1954 as the 62nd Tank Battalion. Inactivated 1 July 1957 in Germany. Relieved 1 October 1957 from assignment to the 10th Infantry Division.
- Maintenance Company, 33rd Armored Regiment, reconstituted 1 October 1957 in the Regular Army.

33rd and 62nd Tank Battalions; Headquarters and Service Company and Companies B and C, 7th Tank Battalion; and Maintenance Company, 33rd Armored Regiment, consolidated 1 October 1957 and consolidated unit reorganized and redesignated as the 33rd Armor, a parent regiment under the Combat Arms Regimental System.

- Withdrawn 16 April 1987 from the Combat Arms Regimental System and reorganized under the United States Army Regimental System.
- Activated 16 April 1987 at Fort Lewis, Washington using personnel and equipment from the 2nd Battalion, 77th Armor. Assigned 15 August 1988 to the 9th Infantry Division. Inactivated 28 September 1990 at Fort Lewis, Washington, and relieved from assignment to the 9th Infantry Division. Assigned 16 February 1991 to the 199th Infantry Brigade and activated at Fort Lewis, Washington. Relieved 16 July 1992 from assignment to the 199th Infantry Brigade. Components of 2nd Battalion 33rd Armor attached 194th (separate) Armor Brigade Fort Knox 1993. Inactivated 14 January 1994 at Fort Polk, Louisiana. Assigned 16 April 1995 to the 2nd Infantry Division and activated at Fort Lewis, Washington using personnel and equipment from the 3rd Battalion, 77th Armor.
- Redesignated as 33rd Cavalry Regiment "Cav Men of War" effective 28 June 2005 and assigned to 3rd Brigade Combat Team -"Rakkasans" 101st Airborne Division (Air Assault) at Fort Campbell, Kentucky. 1-33 Cavalry continues the lineage of 1-33 Armor.

== Mission in 21st century ==
The mission of 1-33 Cavalry is to deploy within 36 hours worldwide as part of a joint multinational, or unilateral task force and destroy enemy forces or seize and retain terrain, to control land, people and resources.

As of 10 May 2006, 1-33 Cavalry was stationed at Forward Operating Base Rustimayah in Iraq. It continued to serve in the country through 2008.

== Campaign participation credit ==
World War II

- Normandy
- Northern France
- Rhineland
- Ardennes-Alsace
- Central Europe

Cold War
Operation Iraqi Freedom
Operation Enduring Freedom

== Decorations ==
- Presidential Unit Citation (Army), Streamer embroidered HASTENRATH-SCHERPENSEEL
- Presidential Unit Citation (Army), Streamer embroidered MORTAIN
- Army Superior Unit Award, Streamer embroidered 1986–1987
- French Croix de Guerre with Silver Star, World War II, Streamer embroidered MONS
- Belgian Fourragere 1940
  - Cited in the Order of the Day of the Belgian Army for action in BELGIUM 1944
  - Cited in the Order of the Day of the Belgian Army for action in the ARDENNES
- Valorous Unit Award Permanent Orders 141-17 dated 21 May 2013, awarded the unit for the period of service: 1 April 2010 to 31 August 2010 citing extraordinary heroism in action against an armed enemy in Operation Enduring Freedom.
- Meritorious Unit Commendation Permanent Orders 107-08 dated 16 April 2008, from Headquarters, Department of the Army, awarded the unit for the period of service: 18 September 2005 to 1 September 2006 citing exceptionally meritorious service in Operation Iraqi Freedom.

== Distinctive unit insignia ==
- Description

A Silver color metal and enamel device 1 1/8 inches (2.9 cm) in height overall consisting of a shield blazon: Vert, in orle thirty-three plates. Attached below and to the sides of the shield a Silver scroll inscribed "MEN OF WAR" in Green letters.

- Symbolism

The shield is green and white for the Armored Force. The thirty-three plates designate the number of the organization.

- Background

The distinctive unit insignia was originally approved for the 33rd Armored Regiment on 26 March 1942. It was redesignated for the 33rd Tank Battalion on 28 July 1949. It was redesignated for the 33rd Medium Tank Battalion on 20 September 1954. The insignia was redesignated for the 33rd Tank Battalion on 3 April 1956. It was redesignated for the 33rd Armor Regiment on 1 July 1958. It was redesignated for the 33rd Cavalry Regiment effective 28 June 2005.

== Coat of arms ==
- Blazon
  - Shield- Vert, in orle thirty-three plates.
  - Crest- On a wreath Argent and Vert, a mound of the last charged in base with a broken meat hook of the first and supporting a castle of two towers of the like, the castle wall embattled of five and charged with a lion rampant Sable, armed and langued Gules, beneath an escutcheon tierced per pale of the second, the fourth, and the second, charged with a mullet Or.
  - Motto- MEN OF WAR
- Symbolism
  - Shield- The shield is green and white for the Armored Forces. The thirty-three plates designated the number of the organization.
  - Crest- The white (silver) castle on a green mound is taken in part from the coat of arms of the city of Mons, province of Hainaut, Belgium. Only two towers of the castle are shown in reference to the two savage attacks, spearheaded by the 33rd Armor Regiment, during the period 31 August – 3 September 1944, on Mons which resulted in its capture from the German 7th Army, alluded to by the meat hook (a charge frequently found in German heraldry) the broken pieces simulating the numeral "7." The liberation of Mons, symbolized by the black lion taken from the coat of arms of Hainaut, and the mauling given elements of the German 7th Army profoundly affected subsequent campaigns as the German 7th Army was moving back to reinforce the Siegfried Line of the Western border of Germany. The 33rd Armor Regiment for its gallant and decisive action in the battle and capture of Mons was awarded, on 15 July 1946, the French Croix de Guerre with Silver Gilt Star by the Provisional Government of France. This award is symbolized by the green, red and green shield with gold star, green and red being the colors of the French Croix de Guerre and fourragere. The five embattlements of the castle wall allude to the five World War II campaigns in which the Regiment participated.
- Background- The coat of arms was originally approved for the 33rd Armored Regiment on 26 March 1942. It was redesignated for the 33rd Tank Battalion on 28 July 1949. It was redesignated for the 33rd Medium Tank Battalion on 20 September 1954. The insignia was redesignated for the 33rd Tank Battalion on 3 April 1956. It was redesignated for the 33rd Armor Regiment on 1 July 1958. It was redesignated for the 33rd Cavalry Regiment effective 28 June 2005.
