= Thurman Anderson =

United States Army general

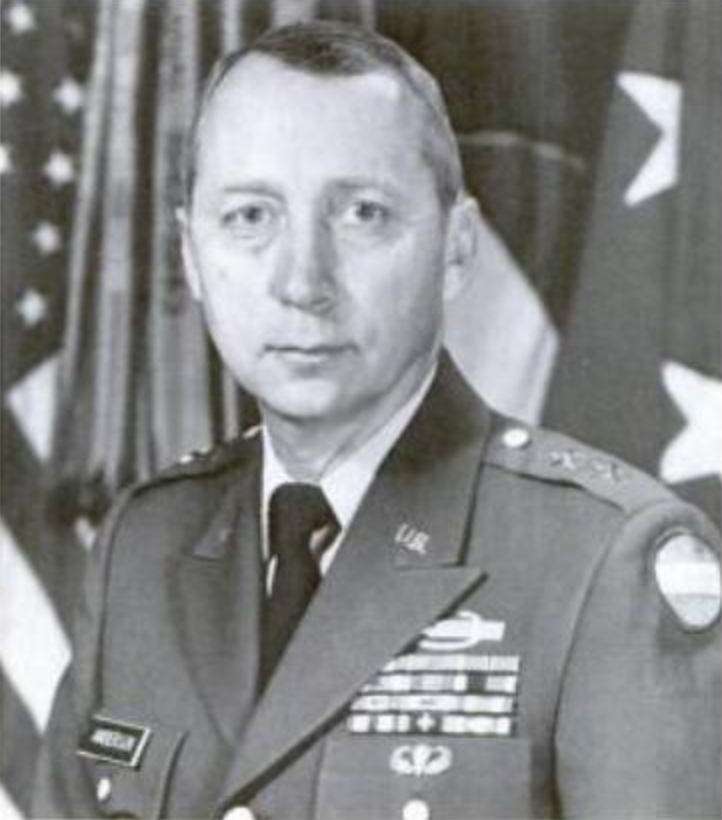
- Born: 2 June 1932 (age 94); Glennville, Georgia U.S.
- Military career
- Allegiance: United States
- Branch: United States Army
- Service years: 1953–late 1980s
- Rank: Major general
- Commands: Chief of Staff, United States Army Forces Command

Thurman E. Anderson (born 2 June 1932) is a retired major general in the United States Army who served as Chief of Staff of United States Army Forces Command. He is alumnus of North Georgia College.
