= Landing on Long Island =

1943 Long Island (New Guinea) landing

- Part of World War II, Pacific War
Date	26 December 1943
Location	Long Island, Territory of New Guinea 5°21′S 147°7′E
Result	Unopposed

Belligerents
United States; Australia	Japan

Commanders and leaders
(United States) Leonard Kaplan	

Strength
220	

Casualties and losses
None	

The Landing on Long Island in the Territory of New Guinea was part of the Huon Peninsula campaign, a series of operations that made up Operation Cartwheel, General Douglas MacArthur's campaign to encircle the major Japanese base at Rabaul. Located at the northern end of the Vitiaz Strait, Long Island was an important staging point for Japanese barges moving between Rabaul and Wewak until 26 December 1943, when a force of 220 Australian and American soldiers landed on the island. It was not occupied by the Japanese at the time, and there was no fighting. At the time, it represented the furthest Allied advance into Japanese-held territory. It was developed into a radar station.

== Background ==
=== Geography ===
Long Island lies at the northern end of the Vitiaz Strait. It is roughly circular in shape, and about 14 miles (23 km) in diameter, with an area of about 160 square miles (410 km^{2}). There are two prominent peaks, the 4,278-foot (1,304 m) Mount Reamur in the north, and the 3,727-foot (1,136 m) Cerisy Peak in the south. Most of the interior is taken up by Lake Wisdom, which is 500 feet (150 m) above sea level. Inside the lake is an active volcanic cone. Offshore there is a 2-to-3.5-knot (3.7 to 6.5 km/h; 2.3 to 4.0 mph) north westerly current. There were two settlements, Bok in the south east and Malala in the north east. The population of the island was about 250, all native. The island had once supported a larger population, but it had been wiped out by a volcanic eruption. The 1660 Plinian eruption was the third largest volcanic eruption recorded in the last 2,000 years. It was more powerful than the 1883 eruption of Krakatoa, and buried Long Island under 30 metres (98 ft) of volcanic ash.

=== Strategy ===
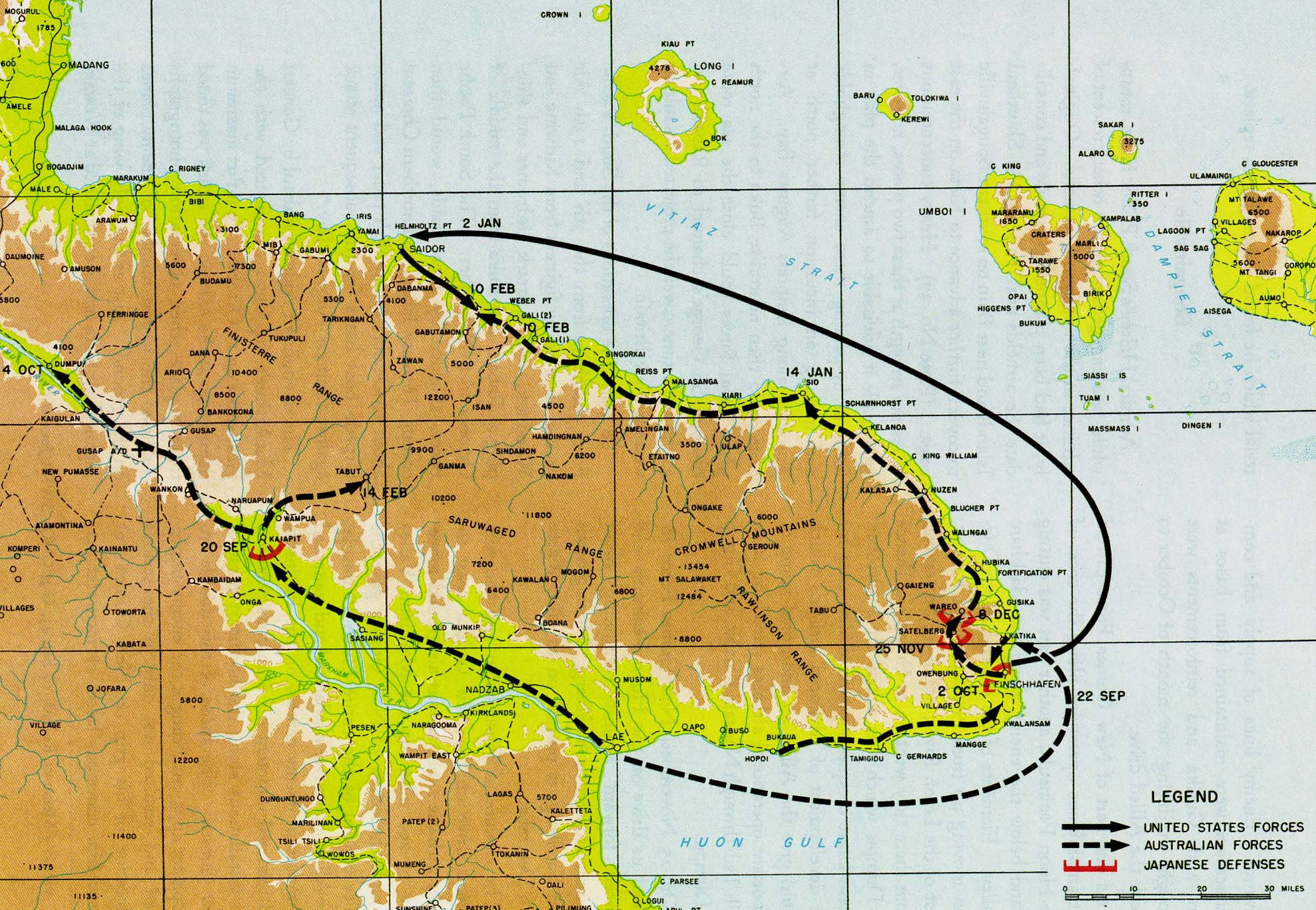
Map of Huon Peninsula operations, 1943–44. Long Island is at the top of the map.

Fighting in the South West Pacific Area in late 1943 and early 1944 was dominated by General Douglas MacArthur's Operation Cartwheel, a series of operations directed at isolating and neutralising Rabaul, the main base of the Imperial Japanese forces. The Huon Peninsula campaign started well, with victories in the landing at Lae and landing at Nadzab but faltered in the face of inclement weather, unfavourable terrain, and tenacious and aggressive Japanese opposition, both on land and in the air. The initiative passed to Lieutenant General Hatazō Adachi's Japanese XVIII Army which launched a series of counter-attacks in the Battle of Finschhafen.

The Allied air, ground and naval forces set out to cut the Japanese supply line, which was by barges moving along the coast between Madang and Fortification Point. Long Island was an important staging point for Japanese barges moving between Rabaul and Madang. In Allied hands, it could be a useful site for a radar station and observation post, and could provide radar coverage for the upcoming landing at Saidor. On 22 December 1943, the commander of Alamo Force, Lieutenant General Walter Krueger, issued his Field Order No. 8, directing the 2nd Engineer Special Brigade to seize Long Island. The operation was codenamed "Sanatogen", and was undertaken concurrently to landings around Cape Gloucester, on New Britain.

== Preliminaries ==
A party of coastwatchers consisting of three Australians from the Allied Intelligence Bureau (AIB) and four natives, were landed on Long Island by a PT boat on 6 October 1943. Their role was to watch for and report on aircraft coming from Madang. At the time of their arrival, there were at least two Japanese parties on the island, but in November they reported that the Japanese had left. The mission commander, Major Leonard Kaplan, flew to Finschhafen on 22 December with two amphibian scouts. At 18:00 the following day they boarded a PT boat that took them to Long Island. They landed on the island at 23:45, guided by lights set up by the AIB. Reassured that there were no Japanese on the island, Kaplan re-embarked and returned to Finschhafen, leaving the two amphibian scouts behind to reconnoitre the island, and to set up lights to guide landing craft during the landing.

Meanwhile, on 22 December the participating elements of the 2nd Engineer Special Brigade set out from Oro Bay for Finschhafen, from whence the assault would be staged. A detachment of 3 officers and 32 men from the Boat Battalion of the 592nd Engineer Boat and Shore Regiment (EBSR) manned three LCVPs and five LCMs. One LCVP acted as a navigation boat; the remaining two, with one officer and eight other ranks, would remain on Long Island with the garrison. The assault troops were 150 men from Company D, Shore Battalion, 592nd EBSR.

At Finschhafen they met up with the Australians of No. 338 Radar Station RAAF, who would man the radar installation on Long Island. This unit had flown in from Jacksons and Wards Airfields around Port Moresby in 11 transport aircraft. It was commanded by Pilot Officer Alan Lum. To help establish the radar station, they were accompanied by some technical experts from No. 41 Wing RAAF. All told, there were 35 RAAF personnel, bringing the assault force to a total of 220 men. A planned rehearsal on 24 December was scrubbed due to an air raid alert. Krueger supervised the drafting of the final landing plan. A final briefing was given at 08:30 on 25 December, and all boats were loaded and equipment stowed by 12:00. The men then sat down to their Christmas dinner of roast turkey. The equipment included two 37 mm guns, four 60 mm mortars, four bazookas, a 5,000-US-gallon (19,000 L; 4,200 imp gal) canvas water tank, a TD9 bulldozer, two jeeps, a jeep trailer with a water tank, and two .50-caliber machine guns.

== Landing ==
The LCMs and LCVPs set out on the 105-mile (169 km) voyage from Finschhafen at 14:15, and made its way along the coast in broad daylight without being engaged by Japanese aircraft or vessels. Three PT boats, carrying the 90 men of Company D who would make up the first wave, set out from Finschhafen at 18:00. Being faster, they overtook the landing craft during the night. They arrived off Malala at 23:45, a quarter of an hour late; but this was of no consequence as there was no preliminary air or naval bombardment owing to there being no Japanese present. The men transferred from the PT boats to six rubber boats. This was not easily accomplished; since there had been no rehearsal, they were unaccustomed to the craft. Guided by the lights the amphibian scouts had set up ashore, the rubber boats set out at 00:20. The surf conditions were rough, and two boats capsized; but neither men nor equipment were lost. The entire first wave was safely ashore by 02:00 on 26 December.

The second wave, the landing craft, arrived off the island at 05:20, eighty minutes late. The beach grade was found to be steep, resulting in a 4-to-6-foot (1.2 to 1.8 m) surf. The force waited until daylight before two LCMs unsuccessfully attempted to beach. They broached, soaking the radar equipment in salt water. A search was then made for a more suitable beach, and one was found south of Cape Reamur. Some 100 measurement tons (110 m^{3}) of equipment were unloaded by 13:00, and the navigation boat LCVP and five LCMs set sail for Finschhafen. The radar equipment was moved inland and covered by tarpaulins. The following night rains caused Lake Wisdom to overflow and the equipment was subjected to a torrent of fresh water.

== Outcome ==
On 27 December 1943 the radar equipment was moved to a 150-foot (46 m) hilltop on the east coast. Two 1,700-pound (770 kg) generators were towed on sleds. The radar station personnel had considerable difficulty keeping the equipment operational in the hot, wet and humid climate, and there were numerous failures. The wet season had begun by the end of December, and the equipment was affected. Two replacement power supplies and a replacement transmitter and receiver for the radar unit arrived on 27 January 1944. By April 1944, the Allies had advanced along the coast to Madang, and the main Japanese air threat was coming from Wewak. No. 338 Radar Station was therefore ordered to move to Matafuna Point on the west coast. This took a week to accomplish. A flying fox was used to bring the equipment back down to sea level. The station was operational again at 19:00 on 11 April 1944. It finally ceased operation on 28 January 1945.

The garrison was for a time the most advanced Allied position in the theatre, and Brigadier General William F. Heavey, the commander of the 2nd Engineer Special Brigade, of which the 592nd EBSR was part, was surprised when its capture was officially announced in December 1943. Rumours were rife among the garrison that the Japanese might attempt to recapture the island and eliminate the radar station. No attempt was made; the Japanese accepted the loss of their staging point. The engineers built defences, camp sites and facilities for the radar station. An airstrip for light Piper Cub aircraft 1,500 feet (460 m) long and 50 feet (15 m) wide was built in five days. Resupply came from Finschhafen in LCMs and the occasional PT boat. On 17 February 1944, the 592nd EBSR Group departed Long Island in an LCVP and seven LCMs of the Boat Battalion. Krueger praised the 592nd EBSR Group, who "by a display of aggressiveness and superior seamanship, accomplished its mission in the face of unusual odds."
