= Engineer Special Brigade =

Former amphibious engineer forces of the United States Army from 1942 to 1955

Engineer special brigade
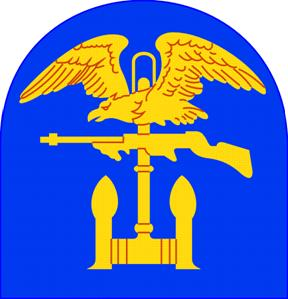
- Engineer special brigade shoulder sleeve insignia
- Active: 1942–1955
- Country: United States
- Allegiance: United States of America
- Branch: Army
- Type: Amphibious Engineers
- Role: Amphibious assaults, shore-to-shore operations
- Size: Brigade
- Engagements: Battle of Normandy

The Engineer Special Brigades were brigade-sized amphibious forces of the United States Army developed during World War II and active from 1942 to 1955. Initially designated engineer amphibian brigades, they were redesignated engineer special brigades in 1943. The 1st, 5th, and 6th Engineer Special Brigades were assigned to the European Theater of Operations. The 1st Engineer Special Brigade participated in the landings in Sicily and Italy before joining the 5th and 6th Engineer Special Brigades for the invasion of Normandy.

The 2nd, 3rd and 4th Engineer Special Brigades were assigned to the Southwest Pacific Area, and participated in the campaigns in the Bismarck Archipelago, New Guinea, Leyte, Luzon, the Southern Philippines and Borneo campaign. The 1st Engineer Special Brigade fought in both theaters of the war, participating in the Okinawa campaign near the end of the war. The 2nd Engineer Special Brigade remained active after the war, and served in the Korean War before being inactivated in 1955.

== Concept ==
At the onset of direct American involvement in World War II, it became apparent that the United States would need a large strategic and tactical amphibious warfare capability. In 1941, the amphibious forces were divided into two corps: one in the Atlantic, and one in the Pacific. Both were combined United States Army and United States Marine Corps commands, administered by the United States Navy. The Amphibious Corps, Atlantic Fleet, consisted of the 1st Infantry Division and the 1st Marine Division, while the Amphibious Corps, Pacific Fleet, consisted of the 3rd Infantry Division and the 2nd Marine Division.

In April 1942, the United States and United Kingdom agreed on plans for an emergency invasion of Northwest Europe in the late northern summer of 1942 (Operation Sledgehammer) that would be conducted in the event of signs that the Soviet Union was on the brink of collapse, or that the Germans were withdrawing from Western Europe, possibly due to an internal coup or collapse. This would be followed by a full-scale crossing of the English Channel in mid-1943 (Operation Roundup). These were envisaged as shore-to-shore operations. The US Navy's policy at this time of only taking volunteers meant that it was short of manpower, and those personnel it had available were mainly allocated warships and the amphibious ships required for ship-to-shore operations. This meant that the landing craft for Sledgehammer would have to be operated by the British and the US Army.

== Amphibious Training Center ==
The Joint Staff then considered the issue of amphibious warfare training. Very large scale operations were contemplated in both Europe and the Pacific, which the Army would have to conduct. To have the Marines carry out all amphibious operations was impractical, as there were limitations on its size, and joint Army-Marine amphibious operations would involve problems of coordination in view of their different organization, doctrine and procedures. The Joint Staff planners therefore felt that the Army should conduct amphibious training. This meant that the Army would have to establish its own amphibious training establishment.

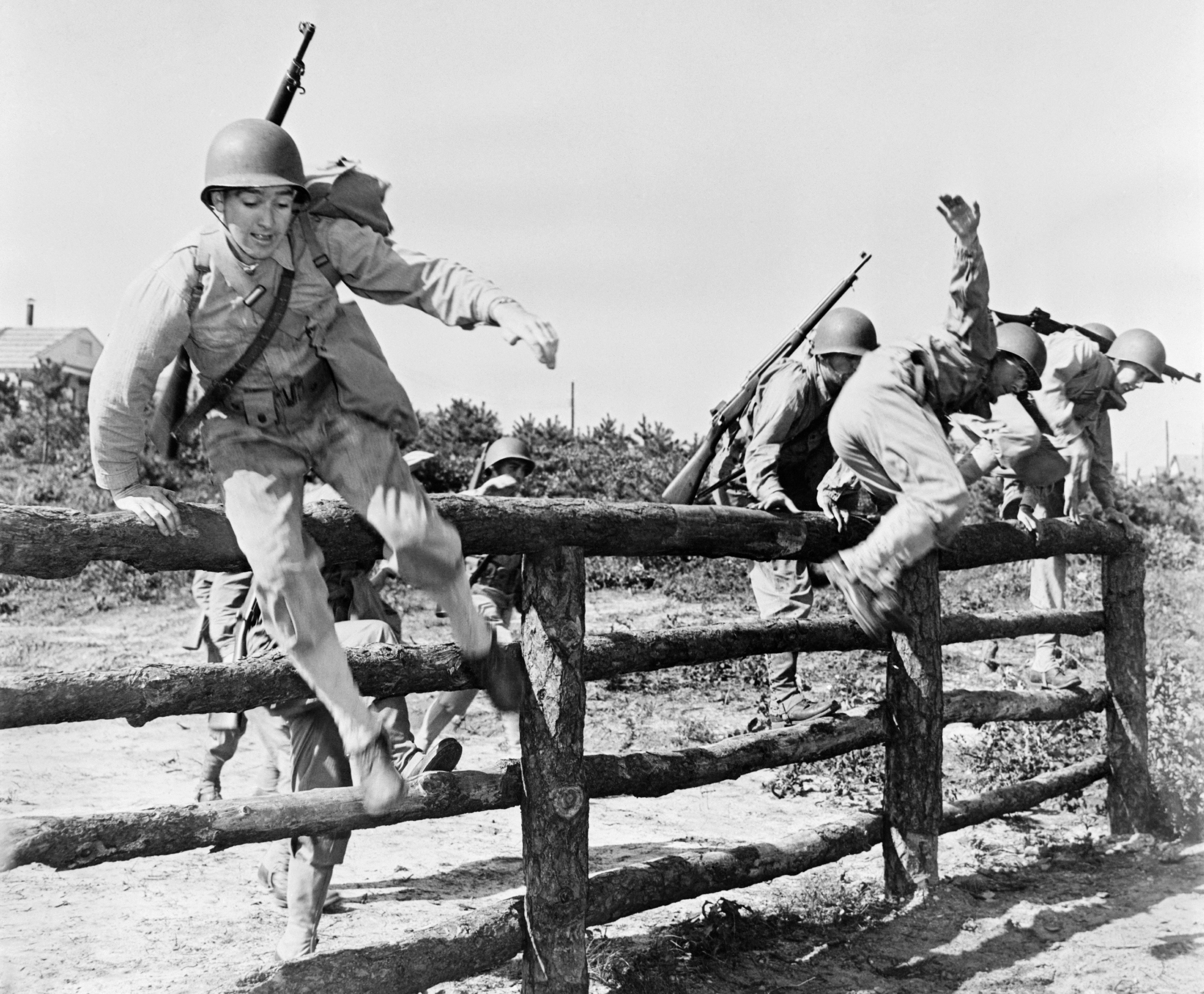
Training at Camp Edwards, Massachusetts

The Joint Staff hoped to have twelve Army divisions (eleven infantry and one armored) trained in amphibious warfare by 1 February 1943. Another two infantry divisions and one armored division would receive training overseas. This did not include the 1st, 3rd and 9th Infantry Divisions, which were already undergoing training, the 3rd on the West Coast and the 1st and 9th on the East coast. In addition, the Army would train enough boat crews to move eight divisions. These would also be available by 1 February 1943. The Joint Staff intended to create three amphibious training centers. The plan was to train four divisions at Camp Edwards, Massachusetts, six at Camp Carrabelle, Florida, and two at Fort Lewis, Washington. It was intended that training at Camp Edwards would be conducted between July and November 1942. The Army Ground Forces was given responsibility for the development of amphibious warfare doctrine and the conduct of unit training.

The Army activated its Amphibious Training Center at Camp Edwards on 22 May 1942, with Colonel Frank A. Keating, the chief of staff of the 2nd Infantry Division, assigned to command it. It became active on 15 June 1942. The 45th Infantry Division underwent training at Camp Edwards from 15 July to 20 August 1942. Training concluded with major amphibious maneuvers from 17 to 19 August, during which the division conducted a shore-to-shore operation, embarking from Washburn Island, Massachusetts, and crossing Vineyard Sound to land on Martha's Vineyard, about 6 miles (9.7 km) away. It was followed by the 36th Infantry Division, which arrived on 22 August, and completed its training on 3 October. The final three days saw a repeat of the shore-to-shore exercise the 45th had conducted.

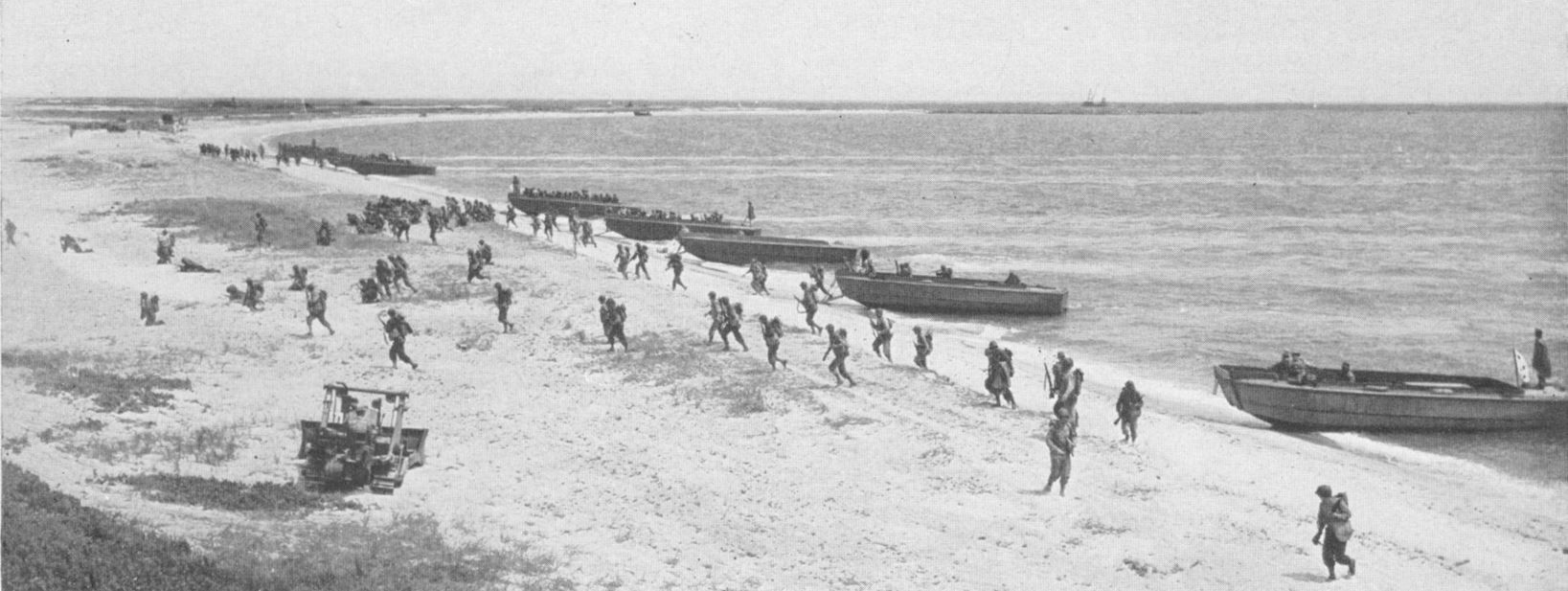
Amphibian engineers land 45th Division troops at Cape Cod using the old LCPs.

The Amphibious Training Center moved to Camp Carrabelle in October 1942. The first formation to undergo training there was the 38th Infantry Division, which commenced its amphibious warfare training there on 23 November 1942. The final shore-to-shore amphibious maneuver was conducted on 17 to 19 December, but performance was not considered satisfactory by the Amphibious Training Center staff, and it was repeated on 28 to 30 December. Camp Carrabelle was renamed Camp Gordon Johnston 13 January 1943. The 28th Infantry Division commenced training on 28 January 1943, and conducted its landing exercise on 7 to 9 March. This was the last division to be trained by the Amphibious Training Center, although three separate battalions, the 81st Chemical Battalion, 61st Medical Battalion and 462nd Anti-Aircraft Artillery Automatic Weapons Battalion, received training there in May 1943.

On 10 March 1943, the Chief of Staff of the United States Army, General George Marshall, and the Commander-in-Chief, United States Fleet, Admiral Ernest King, entered into an agreement that amphibious training would henceforth be a Navy responsibility. The Army Ground Forces was relieved of responsibility for the Amphibious Training Center on 16 March, and it was closed on 10 June.

=== Training for Operation Downfall ===
Following the defeat of Germany in May 1945 (V-E Day), the US Army implemented a significant shift in its training program, primarily focused on preparing for Operation Downfall, the planned invasion of the Japanese home islands. Requiring large-scale movements and specialized training for the final phase of WWII. This redeployment training program, known as Redeployment Training or Rotation and Redistribution, featured the use of underwater demolitions for obstacle clearance by ESB units and beach defenses.

== Engineer Amphibian Command ==
In addition to training combat units in amphibious warfare, the Army also had to train personnel in the operation and maintenance of landing craft. Operating the necessary landing craft was estimated to require 48,000 men, organized into 18 boat operating regiments and seven boat maintenance battalions. Each boat regiment had three battalions, each of three boat companies. It was agreed with the British that boat units deploying to the UK would receive their initial training in the US, and final training in the UK. A consequence was the amphibian engineers' adoption of the British Combined Operations shoulder patch, but with the colors switched to gold on blue. The War Department also authorized the wearing of a pocket patch showing a scarlet seahorse on a white background, these being the colors of the United States Army Corps of Engineers.

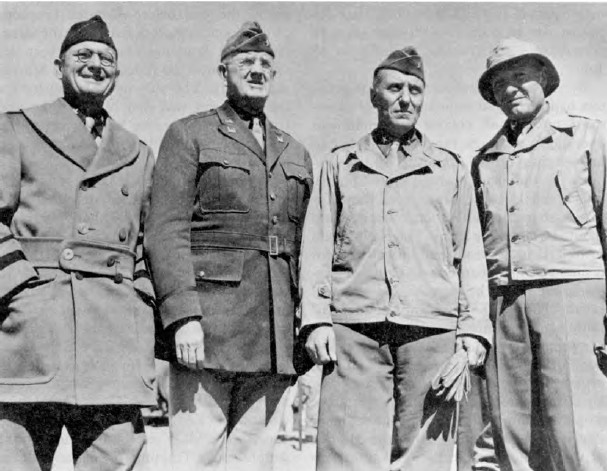
Left to right: Brigadier Generals David Ogden, Clarence Sturdevant, Daniel Noce and Colonel Arthur Trudeau at Camp Edwards, Massachusetts in October 1942

The Engineer Amphibian Command was created on 10 June 1942 at Camp Edwards, Massachusetts under the command of Colonel Daniel Noce, with Lieutenant Colonel Arthur Trudeau as his chief of staff. Noce was answerable to Brigadier General Clarence Sturdevant, the Assistant Chief of Engineers for training. Additional training facilities were established at Cape Cod. The beach south of Buzzards Bay was selected for shore facilities, and Washburn Island was leased as a training site. Some $1.6 million was spent on dredging and the construction of roads, camps, piers and utilities.

Noce and Trudeau considered how the boat units would operate in combat, and noted the importance of well-trained shore parties to load and unload the boats, and establish supply dumps on the far shore. Since combat engineers were not specifically trained for the task, and would in any case have their hands full dealing with obstacles and fortifications, they felt that a permanent organization was required. They drew up a structure for an engineer shore regiment that would combine the functions of a Navy beach party and the Marine Corps shore party. About half the size of a boat regiment, a shore regiment would consist of three battalions, each with a near shore company and two far shore companies. Each shore regiment would be grouped with a boat regiment, a boat maintenance battalion, and support units to form an engineer amphibian brigade capable of moving an entire infantry division. The proposed organization was approved, and authority was granted to form eight engineer amphibian brigades.

The table of organization and equipment for an engineer amphibian brigade provided for 349 officers, 20 warrant officers, and 6,814 enlisted men. The Army searched its personnel records for men with appropriate marine experience. Arrangements were made to train ships' carpenters and marine mechanics at the Gray Marine Motor Company in Michigan, Higgins Industries in Louisiana, and Evinrude Outboard Motors and the Manitowoc Shipbuilding Company in Wisconsin. In all, 3,368 personnel were trained by these companies. Another 1,481 were trained at the Army Ordnance School at Aberdeen, Maryland, the Naval Operating Base at Toledo, Ohio, and the Army Motor School at Fort Holabird, Maryland. The majority, some 33,627 men, were trained at schools run by the Engineer Amphibian Command. Instructors were obtained from the British Army, Royal Navy, and the United States Coast Guard, Marine Corps and United States Coast and Geodetic Survey. Of the 37,651 enlisted men assigned between 10 June 1942 and 31 December 1943, 20,244 came from replacement centers, 11,898 from reception centers and 5,509 from other units; of the 2,899 officers, 634 came from other units, 825 from the Officer Reserve Corps, 965 from Officer Candidate Schools, and 475 through direct commissioning from civilian life.

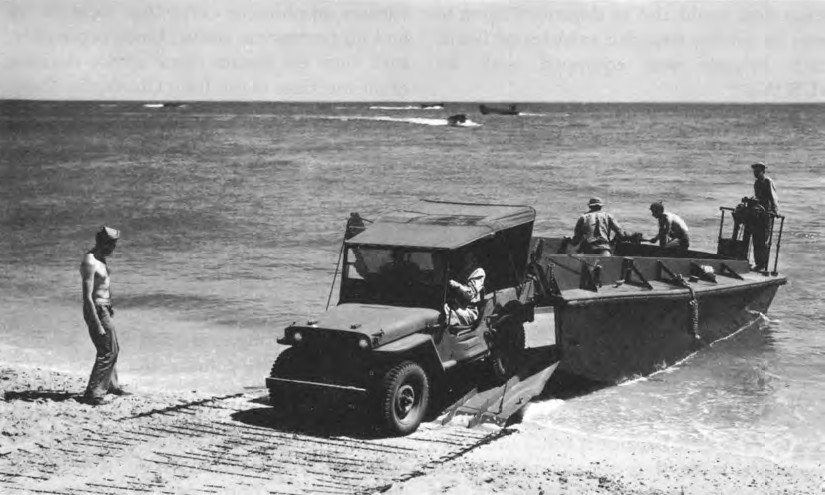
A jeep comes ashore over Sommerfeld track in a training exercise at Camp Edwards.

The Engineer Amphibian Command estimated that it required 1,000 36-foot (11 m) landing craft and 225 50-foot (15 m) tank lighters, but it was soon discovered that this exceeded the number available. The Navy agreed to turn over 300 36-foot craft from new production in June and July. Initially the Engineer Amphibian Command used whatever landing craft were available: the 36-foot landing craft, personnel (LCP); landing craft, ramp (LCR); landing craft, personnel (ramp) (LCP(R)); and landing craft, vehicle (LCV); and a small number of the 50-foot landing craft, mechanized (LCM). Some were petrol-, and some diesel-powered. The 36-foot boats were later superseded by the landing craft, vehicle, personnel (LCVP), which combined their attributes.

The shortage of landing craft meant that enough were available for only one boat battalion at a time. The practice of allocating the boats to one battalion at a time, while the only way that all battalions could be trained, annoyed the Amphibious Training Center, as it meant that its ground units were always training with inexperienced boat crews. Tests were carried out with the newly-developed DUKW, and it was decided that each brigade should be equipped with three of them. An important organizational change as a result of experience with training occurred on 5 September, when Noce decided to group the boat and shore engineers into three boat and shore regiments, each with one boat and one shore battalion. Each boat and shore regiment could work with one of the three infantry regiments in an infantry division.

While the Navy was still willing to allow the Army to operate landing craft, it reserved the right to operate ocean-going landing ships. A dispute arose over which category the larger 105-foot (32 m) Landing craft, tank (LCT) belonged to. The LCT was powered by the same Gray marine diesel engine as the LCVP and LCM, so no special training was required to operate or maintain it. The Engineer Amphibian Command was informed on 21 May 1942 that the Navy had agreed that the Army could operate LCTs, but the British then decided that the LCT was a landing ship after all, and on 29 June the Navy announced that it would be operating the LCTs. This came as a blow to the Engineer Amphibian Command, as it meant that it was dependent on the Navy to transport its larger pieces of equipment like the D8 bulldozer.

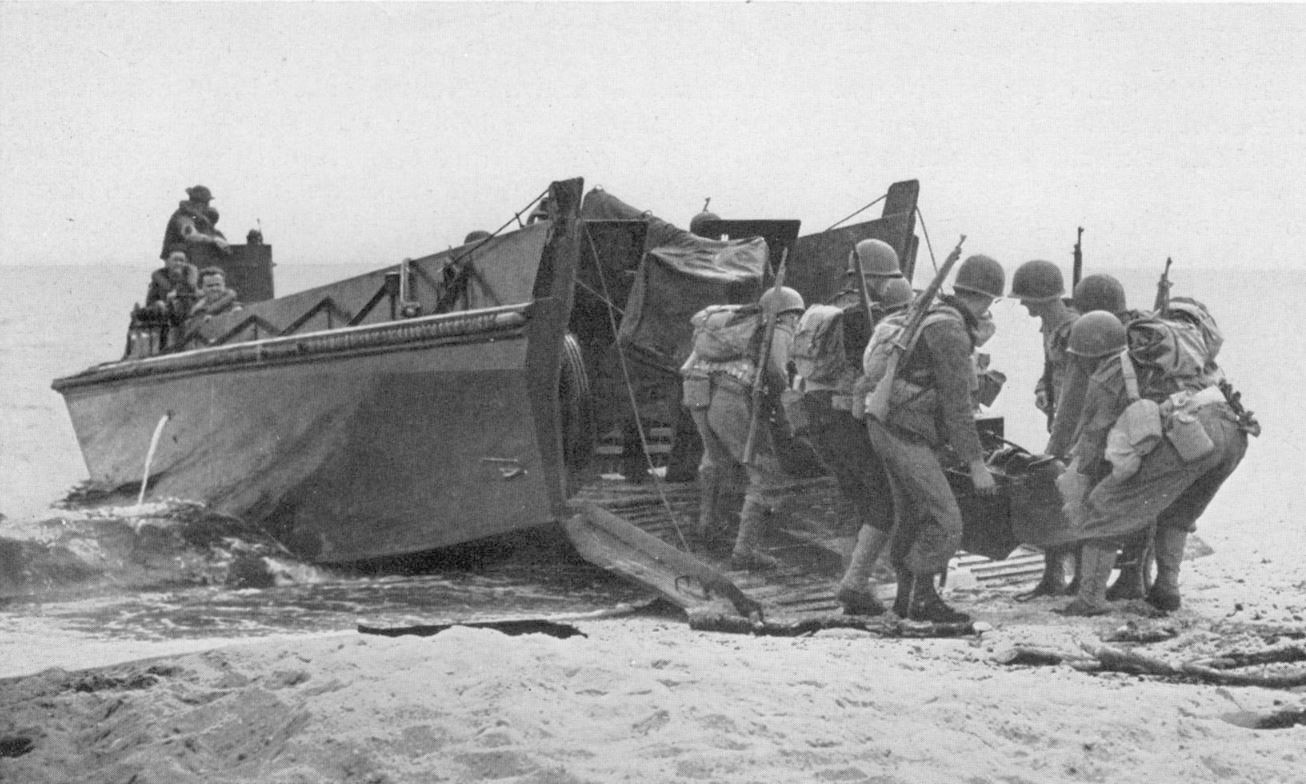
Engineer trainees land a 75 mm gun.

The Navy also announced that it would take over the operation of all landing craft as soon as possible. The reason for this was that Sledgehammer had been abandoned in favor of an invasion of French Northwest Africa (Operation Torch), a ship-to-shore operation, and plans for the 1943 cross-Channel invasion operation were scaled back on 1 July from twelve to eight divisions. The number of engineer amphibian brigades was cut from eight to five; on 17 August it was reduced to just three. Given the additional time, the Navy now believed that it could train all boat crews, but the absorption of the engineer amphibian brigades into the Navy was precluded by the fact that they contained draftees, which the Navy was still refusing to accept.

Uncertainty about the future became acute as the year wore on, as Camp Edwards was unsuitable for boat operations in winter. The Amphibious Training Center moved to Camp Carrabelle, Florida in October, taking the 2nd Engineer Amphibian Brigade with it, but left the 3rd Engineer Amphibian Brigade at Camp Edwards. Up to this point, all plans had revolved around operations in Europe, as the war against Germany had priority, although in planning for amphibious training for twelve divisions, the War Department had also been providing for operations in the Pacific. In the wake of the US victory in the Battle of Midway in June 1942, plans were advanced for offensive operations in the Pacific, particularly in the Solomon Islands.

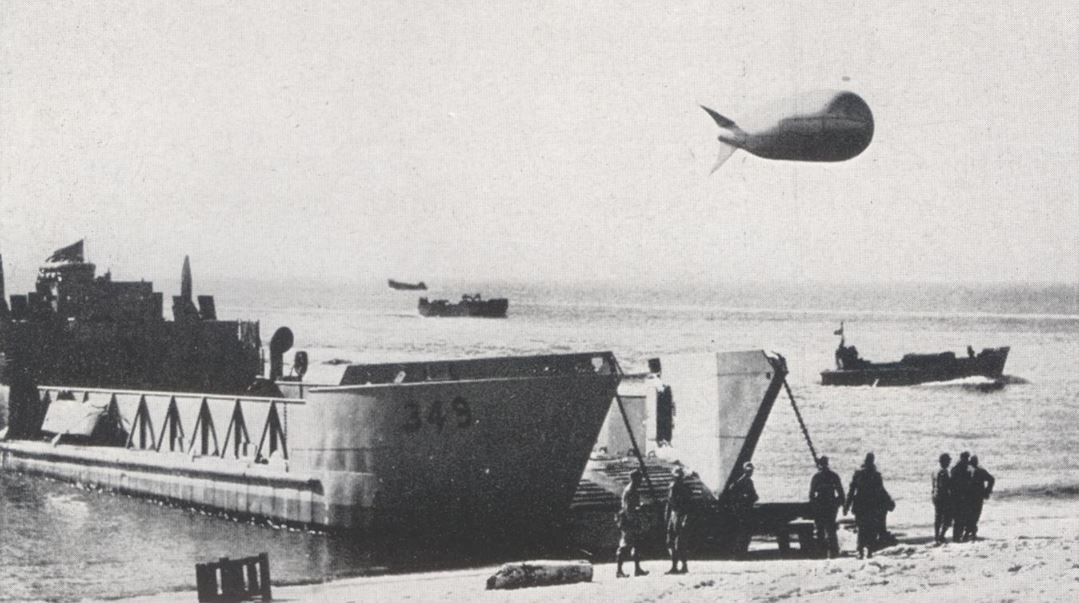
LCT-349 assists in a training exercise.

Amphibious operations in the Southwest Pacific Area (SWPA) depended on the availability of landing craft. The Navy intended to ship only 60 per month to the theater, as they had to be sent deckloaded on ships bound for Australia, as they were too large to fit into ships' holds. Trudeau proposed shipping them as components. In this way hundreds could be carried in a ship's hold. They could be assembled in Australia by the 411th Base Shop Battalion. The decision to ship the 2nd Engineer Amphibian Brigade to Australia freed accommodation at Camp Carrabelle for the 3rd Engineer Amphibian Brigade, although it meant that yet another cycle of training would be conducted with inexperienced boat crews. On 27 November, General Douglas MacArthur asked for two more brigades. He also recommended that their name be changed from "amphibian" to "special".

Voluntary enlistment in the Navy of men aged 18 to 37 ended on 5 December 1942; henceforth men in this age group could be obtained only through the draft. This cleared the way for absorption of the Army boat crews into the Navy. On 8 March 1943, the War and Navy Departments agreed that landing craft should be operated by the Navy, but exempted the three engineer special brigades allocated to SWPA. The 4th Engineer Special Brigade completed its training at Camp Edwards in August 1943, and then moved to Camp Gordon Johnston, where it conducted joint training with the 4th Infantry Division. After it departed for Australia in December 1943, the Engineer Amphibian Command provided instruction to replacement crews before being disbanded in April 1944.

== 1st Engineer Special Brigade ==
The 1st Engineer Amphibian Brigade was activated at Camp Edwards on 15 June 1942. Some 2,269 men were transferred from existing units, the 37th Engineer Combat Regiment providing the nucleus of the boat regiment, and the 87th Engineer Heavy Ponton Battalion that of the shore regiment. Brigadier General Henry C. Wolfe was assigned as commanding general on 7 July 1942. The brigade trained until 15 July, when it was assigned to the Amphibious Training Command.

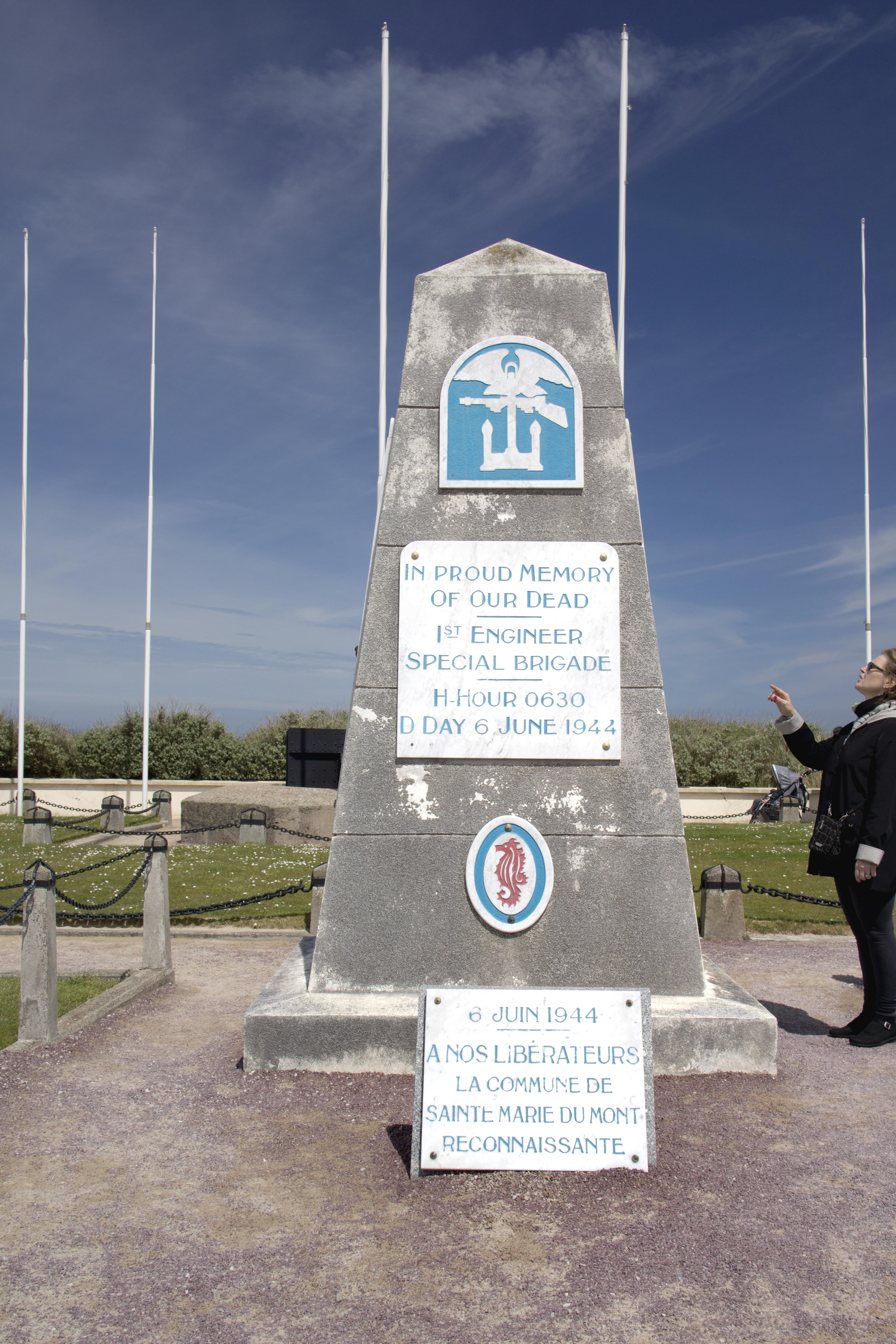
Monument for the 1st Engineer Special Brigade on Utah Beach

The brigade was pulled from the Amphibious Training Center early and sent to England to participate in Operation Sledgehammer, departing from the New York Port of Embarkation on 5 August, and arriving on 17 August. Elements of the brigade participated in the Operation Torch. The 531st Shore Regiment and 286th Signal Company acted as the shore party for the 1st Infantry Division, while the 2nd Battalion, 591st Engineer Boat Regiment was reorganized as a shore battalion, and operated in support of Combat Command B, 1st Armored Division. Brigade headquarters departed Glasgow on 24 November, and landed in North Africa on 6 December. Wolfe became chief engineer at the Services of Supply on 22 February and Colonel R. L. Brown of the 531st Engineer Shore Regiment acted as commander.

Wolfe rejoined the brigade on 22 March 1943, but on 25 May he became S-3 at Allied Force Headquarters, and was replaced by Colonel Eugene M. Caffey. On 10 May 1943, the brigade was redesignated the 1st Engineer Special Brigade. The 591st Boat Regiment was detached, as was the 561st Boat Maintenance Company, which remained in England working on Navy landing craft, but the 36th and 540th Engineer Combat Regiments were attached for the 10 July Allied invasion of Sicily (Operation Husky), bringing the strength of the brigade to over 20,000. The brigade then participated in the Allied invasion of Italy at Salerno (Operation Avalanche) on 9 September.

In November 1943, the headquarters of the 1st Engineer Special Brigade, along with the 531st Shore Regiment, 261st Medical Battalion, 286th Signal Company, 262nd Amphibian Truck Battalion and 3497th Ordnance Medium Automotive Maintenance Company, returned to England to participate in the invasion of Normandy (Operation Overlord). This nucleus of 3,346 men was built up to a strength of 15,000 men for Overlord. During Exercise Tiger, a rehearsal for the Normandy operation on 28 April, German E-Boats attacked a convoy of landing ships, tank (LSTs) of the XI Amphibious Force carrying troops of the brigade. Two LSTs were sunk, and the brigade lost 413 men dead and 16 wounded. The exercise was observed by Lieutenant General Omar N. Bradley, who, unaware of the sinking of the LSTs, blamed the resulting poor performance of the brigade on Caffey, and had him temporarily replaced for the Normandy landings by Brigadier General James E. Wharton.

The brigade participated in the D-Day landing on Utah Beach, and operated as Utah Beach Command until 23 October 1944, and then as the Utah District of the Normandy Base Section until 7 December 1944. Under the command of Colonel Benjamin B. Talley, the brigade headquarters returned to England, and embarked for the United States on 23 December. It arrived at Fort Dix, New Jersey, on 30 December. After four weeks leave, it reassembled at Fort Lewis, Washington. Part of the brigade headquarters went by air to Leyte to join the XXIV Corps for the invasion of Okinawa, while the rest traveled directly to Okinawa on the USS Achernar. The brigade was in charge of unloading on Okinawa from 9 April to 31 May. It then prepared for the invasion of Japan. This did not occur due to the end of the war, and the brigade landed in Korea on 12 September 1945. Its final commander was Colonel Robert J. Kasper, who assumed command on 1 November 1945. The brigade was inactivated in Korea on 18 February 1946.

On 30 September 1986, the brigade was reformed at Fort Leonard Wood, Missouri, as the 1st Engineer Brigade, and was assigned to the United States Army Training and Doctrine Command.

=== Organization for the landing in Normandy ===
- Brigade Headquarters
- 531st Engineer Shore Regiment
- 24th Amphibian Truck Battalion
  - 462nd Amphibian Truck Company
  - 478th Amphibian Truck Company
  - 479th Amphibian Truck Company
- 306th Quartermaster Battalion
  - 556th Quartermaster Railhead Company
  - 562nd Quartermaster Railhead Company
  - 3939th Quartermaster Gas Supply Co
- 191st Ordnance Battalion
  - 3497th Ordnance Medium Automotive Maintenance Company
  - 625th Ordnance Ammunition Company
  - 161st Ordnance Platoon
- Quartermaster Hq 1st Engineer Special Company (1 section)
- 577th Quartermaster Battalion
  - 363rd Quartermaster Service Company
  - 3207th Quartermaster Service Company
  - 4144th Quartermaster Service Company
- 261st Medical Battalion (Amphibious), Companies A, B and C
- 449th Military Police Company
- 286th Joint Assault Signal Company
- 33rd Chemical Decontamination Company
- Units Attached to 1st Brigade
  - 23d Ordnance Bomb Disposal Squadron
  - Signal Photo Team (Det. E)
  - 2nd Naval Beach Battalion
  - 490th Port Battalion
    - 226th Port Company
    - 227th Port Company
    - 228th Port Company
    - 229th Port Company
  - 518th Port Battalion
    - 298th Port Company
    - 299th Port Company
    - 300th Port Company
    - 301st Port Company
    - 278th Port Company
    - 279th Port Company
  - 519th Port Battalion
    - 302th Port Company
    - 303th Port Company
    - 304th Port Company
    - 305th Port Company
    - 280th Port Company
    - 281st Port Company
  - 38th Engineer (GS) Regiment (2 battalions)
  - 1605th Engineer Map Section
  - 440th Engineer Dep. Company (1 platoon)
  - 1217th Engineer F. F. Platoon
  - 1218th Engineer F. F. Platoon
  - 1st Medical Dep. (2 Sect. Sup Platoon)
  - 6th Surgical Group (12 teams)
  - 175th Signal Rep. Company (Det.)
  - 218th Signal Dep. Company (Det.)
  - 980th Signal Service Company (Det.)
  - 999th Signal Service Company (Sp. Det.)
  - 3111st Signal Service Battalion (Sp. Det.)
  - 165th Signal Photo Team (Det. E)
  - 607th Quartermaster Graves Registration Company (1 platoon)
  - 262d Quartermaster Battalion
    - 4061st Service Company
    - 4088th Service Company
    - 4090th Service Company
    - 4190th Service Company
  - 244th Quartermaster Service Battalion
    - 3877th Gas Supply Company
    - 3878th Gas Supply Company
    - 522d Railhead Company
  - 4041st Quartermaster Truck Company
  - 3683d Quartermaster Truck Company
  - 3684th Quartermaster Truck Company
  - 3692d Quartermaster Truck Company
  - 4002d Quartermaster Truck Company
  - 308th Quartermaster Railhead Company
  - 537th Quartermaster Battalion
    - 4083d Quartermaster Service Company
    - 4092d Quartermaster Service Company
    - 4132d Quartermaster Service Company
  - 23d Ordnance Bomb Disposal Squadron
  - 3516th MAM Company
  - 783d Military Police Battalion, Company D
  - 301st Military Police, PW Esc. Guard Company
  - 595th Military Police, PW Esc. Guard Company
  - 815th T. C. Amphibious Truck Company
  - 816th T. C. Amphibious Truck Company
  - 817th T. C. Amphibious Truck Company
  - 818th T. C. Amphibious Truck Company
  - Det. VIII AF Intransit Dep. Group
  - Det. A, 112th Port

=== Campaign credits ===
- World War II
  - Sicily
  - Naples-Foggia
  - Normandy (with arrowhead)
  - Northern France
  - Ryukyus

== 2nd Engineer Special Brigade ==
The 2nd Engineer Amphibian Brigade was activated at Camp Edwards on 20 June 1942, with the 532nd Engineer Shore Regiment and 592nd Engineer Boat Regiment assigned. Colonel William F. Heavey, who was appointed its commander on 6 August 1942, and was promoted to brigadier general on 10 September, led the brigade for the rest of the war. It quickly expanded to 6,000 men, but lost 1,500 in September to the 540th Shore Regiment. On 1 October, the brigade was reorganized; the 532nd and 592nd became engineer amphibian regiments and the 542nd Engineer Amphibian Regiment was formed. The brigade, less the 542nd Engineer Amphibian Regiment, moved by rail to Camp Carrabelle on 15 October. On 7 November, the brigade moved to Fort Ord, California, where it was joined by the 542nd Engineer Amphibian Regiment the following day. In January and February 1943, the brigade embarked from the San Francisco Port of Embarkation on a series of vessels bound for Australia.

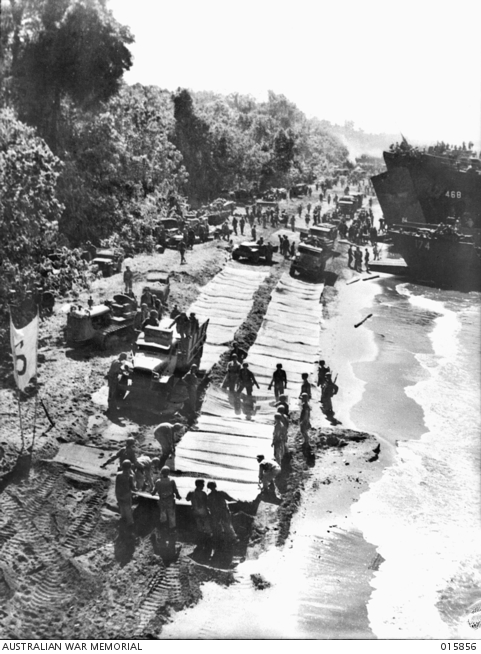
The US 532nd Engineer Boat and Shore Regiment lays beach mats to allow vehicles to move along the sand at Red Beach, near Lae.

In Australia, the brigade was based at Cairns, although its headquarters was co-located with that of I Corps in Rockhampton, 600 miles (970 km) away. The brigade helped the 411th Base Shop Battalion establish a landing craft construction facility, which produced its first finished LCVP on 7 April. In May, elements of the brigade began moving to New Guinea. A detachment of ten LCMs of the 592nd Engineer Amphibian Regiment went to Port Moresby, where it moved supplies to the Lakekamu River. They were followed by detachments of the 532nd and 542nd, which moved to Milne Bay, Oro Bay and Samarai. On 30 June, the brigade participated in its first amphibious operation, the landing at Nassau Bay. On 4 July, the brigade was renamed the 2nd Engineer Special Brigade, and its three regiments became engineer boat and shore regiments.

The 2nd Engineer Special Brigade trained at Cairns with the Australian 9th Division in June and July 1943. The 532nd Engineer Boat and Shore Regiment then moved to New Guinea, and landed part of the 9th Division at Red Beach near Lae on 4 September. On 22 September, it landed elements of the 9th Division at Scarlet Beach near Finschhafen. On 11 October, four Japanese barges attempted to land on Scarlet Beach. They were defeated by men of the 532nd Engineer Boat and Shore Regiment, including Private Junior Van Noy, who was posthumously awarded the Medal of Honor.

Over the next few months, units of the 2nd Engineer Special Brigade participated in the landings at Arawe, Long Island, Saidor, Sio, Los Negros, Talasea, Hollandia, Wakde and Biak. On 20 October 1944 it participated in the amphibious assault on Leyte in the Philippines. Over the following months it participated in a series of amphibious operations to liberate the Philippines. Nine of the 2nd Engineer Special Brigade's units were awarded Presidential Unit Citations.

The 2nd Engineer Special Brigade arrived back in San Francisco on 16 December 1945, and returned to Fort Ord. It later moved to Fort Worden, Washington, where it was stationed when the Korean War broke out in June 1950.

=== Korean War ===
The brigade moved to Yokohama, The brigade was re-designated as the 2nd Amphibious Support Brigade on 26 June 1952. In December 1953 it moved to Camp McGill in Japan, where it was inactivated on 24 June 1955.

- Amphibious Assault Support: The 2nd ESB participated in the Inchon Landing in September 1950, carrying the 1st Marine Division and supporting the assault.
- Port and Beach Operations: After the landings, they were responsible for running port operations, managing cargo loading and unloading, establishing supply dumps on the shore, and providing emergency construction. The 2nd ESB ran port operations at Inchon and later at other ports like Suyong and Ulsan.
- Evacuation Operations: The brigade was instrumental in the evacuation of Hungnam in December 1950, managing the shore operations to load out U.N. troops, equipment, and thousands of civilian refugees in what became the largest evacuation by sea in U.S. military history.

The service of the 2nd ESB in the Korean War earned them decorations, including the Presidential Unit Citation (Navy) with the streamer "INCHON," and the Republic of Korea Presidential Unit Citation.

=== 1956 to 2015 ===
The brigade was reactivated at Fort Belvoir, Virginia, on 13 November 1956, and inactivated at Fort Story, Virginia, on 25 August 1965. It was reactivated as the 2nd Engineer Brigade at Joint Base Elmendorf-Richardson, Alaska, on 16 September 2011. Although no longer an amphibian brigade, it wore the World War II-era seahorse emblem until inactivated there on 15 May 2015.

=== World War II organization ===
- Brigade Headquarters
- 532nd Engineer Boat and Shore Regiment
- 542nd Engineer Boat and Shore Regiment
- 592nd Engineer Boat and Shore Regiment
- 562nd Engineer Boat Maintenance Battalion
  - 1458th Engineer Maintenance Company
  - 1459th Engineer Maintenance Company
  - 1460th Engineer Maintenance Company
  - 1570th Engineer Heavy Equipment Shop Company
  - 1762nd Engineer Parts Supply Platoon
- 262nd Medical Battalion
- 162nd Ordnance Maintenance Company
- 189th Quartermaster Gas Supply Company
- 287th Signal Company
- 695th Truck Company
- 3498th Ordnance Medium Maintenance Company
- 5204th Transportation Corps Amphibious Truck Company
- Medical Detachment, 2nd Engineer Special Brigade
- Support Battery (Provisional) 2nd Engineer Special Brigade
- 416th Army Service Forces Band

=== Campaign credits ===
- World War II
  - New Guinea
  - Leyte (with arrowhead)
- Korean War
  - UN Defensive
  - UN Offensive
  - CCF Intervention
  - First UN Counteroffensive
  - CCF Spring Offensive
  - UN Summer-Fall Offensive

== 3rd Engineer Special Brigade ==
Commanded for almost the entire war by Colonel David Ayres Depue Ogden, who was promoted to brigadier general on 18 September 1942, the 3rd Engineer Amphibian Brigade was activated at Camp Edwards on 6 August 1942 with the 533rd Engineer Shore Regiment and 593rd Engineer Boat Regiment assigned. On 9 November they became engineer amphibian regiments, and the 543rd Engineer Amphibian Regiment was assigned to the brigade. The brigade moved to Camp Gordon Johnston by rail in November. In April 1943 it relocated to Fort Ord, where it prepared to move to Australia. Due to shipping shortages and changes in priorities, this took six months. The brigade was redesignated the 3rd Engineer Special Brigade on 25 May 1943, and the amphibian regiments became engineer boats and shore regiments.

The first unit of the brigade to reach New Guinea was the 563rd Engineer Boat Maintenance Battalion, which arrived at Milne Bay on 14 October 1943; the rest of the brigade followed in December 1943 and January 1944. The brigade became widely scattered, and never operated as a single unit, but Ogden retained control using a special radio net. It participated in the landings at Talasea, Aitape, Lingayen, and Borneo and Mindanao. The brigade returned to the United States on 20 December 1945, and was inactivated two days later.

=== World War II organization ===
- Brigade Headquarters
- Medical Detachment
- 533rd Engineer Boat and Shore Regiment
- 543rd Engineer Boat and Shore Regiment
- 593rd Engineer Boat and Shore Regiment
- 563rd Engineer Boat Maintenance Battalion
  - HQ and HQ Detachment
  - 1461st Engineer Maintenance Company
  - 1462nd Engineer Maintenance Company
  - 1463rd Engineer Maintenance Company
  - 1571st Engineer Heavy Equipment Shop Company
  - 1763rd Engineer Parts Supply Platoon
- 263rd Medical Battalion
- 163rd Ordnance Maintenance Company
- 198th Quartermaster Gasoline Supply Company
- 288th Signal Company
- 693rd Truck Company
- 3499th Ordnance Medium Maintenance Company
- 417th Army Service Forces Band

=== Campaign honors ===
- World War II
  - New Guinea

== 4th Engineer Special Brigade ==
The 4th Engineer Amphibian Brigade was activated at Fort Devens on 1 February 1943, with the 534th, 544th and 594th Engineer Amphibian Regiments assigned. The brigade moved to Camp Edwards, where it was redesignated the 4th Engineer Special Brigade on 10 May, with the three regiments becoming engineer boat and shore regiments. The brigade moved to Camp Gordon Johnston in September 1943, and then staged at Camp Stoneman, California, on 21 April 1944, before departing the San Francisco Port of Embarkation for New Guinea on 28 April. Its commanding general throughout its lifetime was Colonel Henry Hutchings, Jr., who was promoted to brigadier general on 15 January 1944.

The 4th Engineer Amphibian Brigade arrived at Oro Bay on 18 May 1944, where its headquarters opened on 23 May. Most of the rest of the brigade arrived in the area over the next few weeks, and participated in amphibious training with the 31st Infantry Division. The Boat Battalion of the 534th Engineer Boat and Shore Regiment was sent to the Bulimba Boat Yards in Brisbane, where it was engaged in assembling landing craft. It participated in the assaults on Morotai in the Netherlands East Indies on 15 September 1944, and Lingayen Gulf on Luzon in the Philippines on 9 January 1945. It was inactivated in Japan on 15 April 1946.

=== World War II organization ===
- Brigade Headquarters
- Medical Detachment
- 534th Engineer Boat and Shore Regiment
- 544th Engineer Boat and Shore Regiment
- 594th Engineer Boat and Shore Regiment
- 564th Engineer Boat Maintenance Battalion
- 264th Medical Battalion
- 164th Ordnance Maintenance Company
- 199th Quartermaster Gasoline Supply Company
- 289th Signal Company
- 694th Truck Company
- 3492nd Ordnance Medium Maintenance Company
- 4th Engineer Amphibian Brigade Band (August 1945 became 434th Army Service Forces Band attached to Sixth Army)

=== Campaign honors ===
- World War II:
  - New Guinea
  - Luzon

== 5th Engineer Special Brigade ==
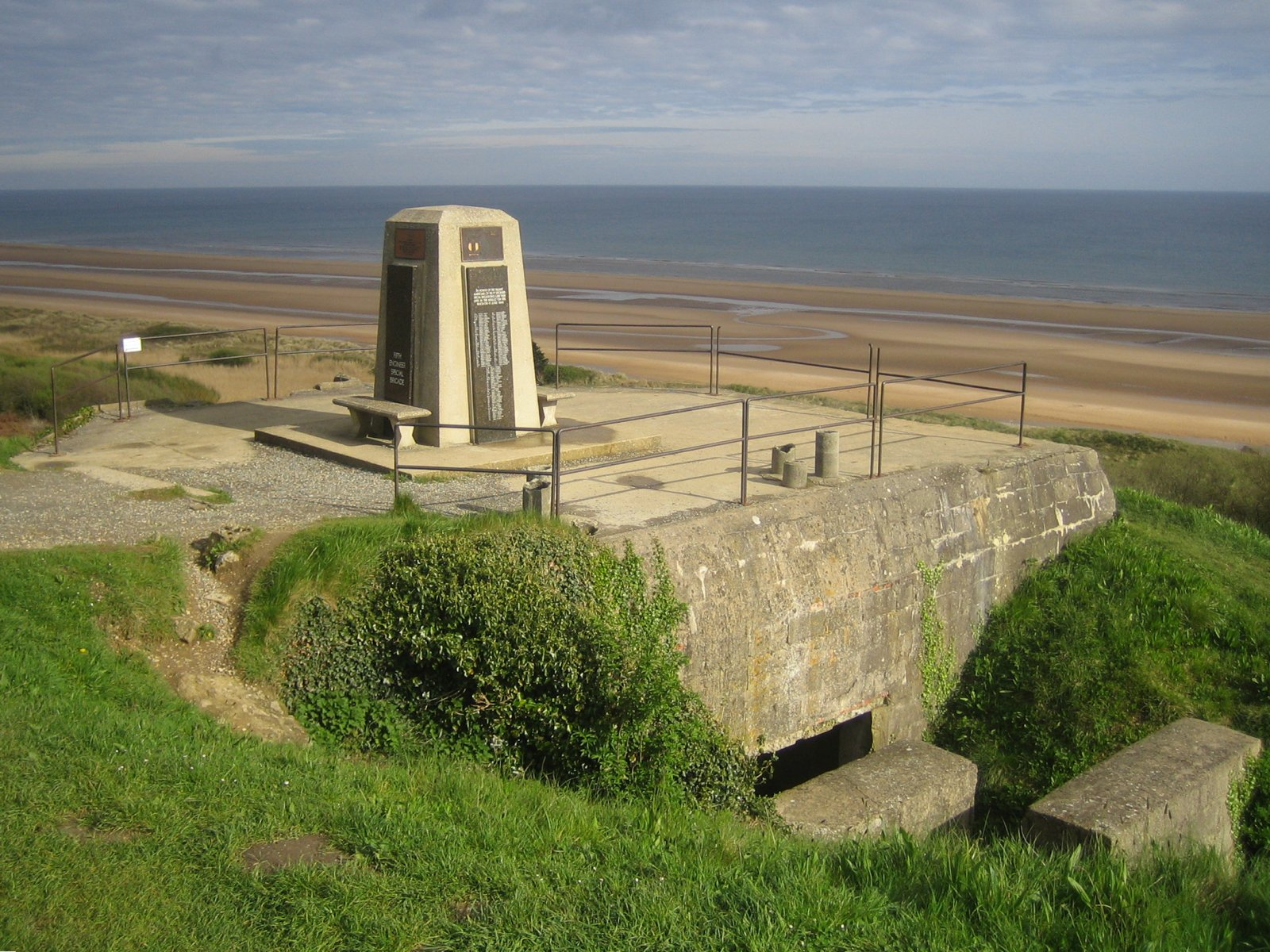
5th Engineer Special Brigade monument on Omaha Beach

The 336th Engineer General Service Regiment was activated at Camp Rucker, Alabama, on 25 July 1942, under the command of Lieutenant Colonel William D. Bridges. On 7 April 1943, it was redesignated the 1119th Engineer Combat Group, with its 1st and 2nd Battalions becoming the 336th and 234th Engineer Combat Battalions respectively. The 1119th Engineer Combat Group moved to Fort Pierce, Florida, on 15 April, where the 348th Engineer Combat Battalion was assigned as the third battalion of the group on 21 April. The group moved to Camp Pickett, Virginia, on 16 June. The 234th Engineer Combat Battalion was detached on 15 August, and replaced by the 37th Engineer Combat Battalion on 22 August. The group staged for overseas movement at Camp Myles Standish, Massachusetts. It left the Boston Port of Embarkation on 21 October, and arrived in the UK on 1 November. It was redesignated the 5th Engineer Special Brigade on 12 November 1943 at Swansea, Wales. The following day, Colonel William M. Hoge assumed command of the brigade.

Unlike the brigades in the Pacific, those in the European Theater had no boat units, although they did have additional service units to handle cargo over the beaches. When Hoge stepped up to command the provisional Special Brigade Group, he was replaced by Colonel Doswell Gullatt. For the invasion of Normandy, the brigade had a strength of 6,756 men. It landed on Omaha Beach, where it was responsible for the eastern beaches, Easy Red, Fox Green and Fox Red. Gullatt was hospitalized due to illness in July 1944, and Bridges assumed command on 31 July. The brigade operated Omaha Beach until it was closed on 19 November 1944. On 4 January 1945, the brigade was transferred to the Seine Section of Paris, where it supervised construction activities. It returned to the United States on 11 July 1945, and was inactivated at Camp Gordon Johnston on 20 October of that year.

=== Units assigned on D-Day, 6 June 1944 ===
- Brigade Headquarters
- 37th Engineer Combat Battalion
- 336th Engineer Combat Battalion
- 348th Engineer Combat Battalion
- 61st Medical Battalion
  - 391st Medical Collection Company
  - 392nd Medical Collection Company
  - 395th Medical Collection Company
  - 643rd Medical Clearing Company
- 210th Military Police Company
- 30th Chemical Decontamination Company
- 294th Joint Assault Signal Company
- 251st Ordnance Battalion
  - 616th Ordnance Ammunition Company
  - 3566th Ordnance Medium Automotive Maintenance Company
  - 26th Bomb Disposal Squad
  - 4042nd Quartermaster Truck Company
- 533rd Quartermaster Battalion
  - 4141st Quartermaster Service Company
  - 4142nd Quartermaster Service Company
  - 4143rd Quartermaster Service Company
- 131st Quartermaster Battalion (Mobile)
  - 453rd Amphibian Truck Company
  - 458th Amphibian Truck Company
  - 459th Amphibian Truck Company
- 619th Quartermaster Battalion
  - 97th Quartermaster Railhead Company
  - 559th Quartermaster Railhead Company
  - Co. A, 203rd Quartermaster Gas Supply Battalion
- Attached Units
  - 6th Naval Beach Battalion
  - 440th Engineer Depot Co. (1 Platoon)
  - 467th Engineer Maintenance Co. (1 Platoon)
  - 1219th Engineer F.F. Platoon
  - 26th Bomb Disp. Squadron
  - 1st Medical Depot Sec.
  - 3d Auxiliary Surgical Group (8 Teams)
  - VHF Signal Unit (Br)
  - 175th Signal Rep. Det.
  - 215th Signal S&I Section
  - 980th Signal Radio Link
  - 162d Signal Photo Co. Det 4
  - 607th Graves Registration Company (2 Platoons)
  - 4042 Quartermaster Tk. Company
  - 487th Port Battalion
    - 184th Port Company
    - 185th Port Company
    - 186th Port Company
    - 187th Port Company
    - 282d Port Company
    - 283d Port Company
  - 502nd Port Battalion
    - 270th Port Company
    - 271st Port Company
    - 272d Port Company
    - 273d Port Company

=== Campaign honors ===
- World War II
  - Normandy
  - Northern France
  - Ardennes-Alsace
  - Central Europe

== 6th Engineer Special Brigade ==
The 146th Engineer Combat Regiment was activated at Camp Swift, Texas, on 25 January 1943. On 1 April 1943 it was redesignated the 1116th Engineer Combat Group. The group moved to Fort Pierce, Florida, for amphibious training on 16 August, and then to Camp Pickett, Virginia, on 10 October. It staged at Camp Kilmer, New Jersey, before departing the New York Port of Embarkation on 8 January 1944. It arrived in the UK on 17 January, where it was redesignated the 6th Engineer Special Brigade on 15 May.

The brigade participated in the invasion of Normandy, operating the western end of Omaha Beach, the Charlie, Dog and Easy Green beaches. The brigade lost its commander, Colonel Paul W. Thompson, who was seriously wounded on D-Day, and he was replaced by Colonel Timothy L. Mulligan. It operated Omaha Beach until it was closed on 19 November. The brigade then became responsible for the security of the western coast of the Cotentin Peninsula. On 29 December the brigade was assigned to the Advance Section (ADSEC), where it was responsible for construction and road maintenance. On 28 March 1945, it was made responsible for coal mining. On 14 July the brigade headquarters, without any troops, embarked at Le Havre for the United States. The brigade arrived in the United States on 23 July 1945, and was inactivated at Camp Gordon Johnston on 20 October.

=== Units assigned on D-Day, 6 June 1944 ===
- Brigade Headquarters
- 147th Engineer Combat Battalion
- 149th Engineer Combat Battalion
- 203rd Engineer Combat Battalion
- 60th Medical Battalion
  - 453rd Medical Collection Company
  - 499th Medical Collection Company
  - 500th Medical Collection Company
  - 634th Medical Clearing Company
- 214th Military Police Company
- 31st Chemical Decontamination Company
- 293rd Joint Assault Signal Company
- 74th Ordnance Battalion
  - 618th Ordnance Ammunition Company
  - 3565th Ordnance Medium Automotive Maintenance Company
- 538th Quartermaster Battalion
  - 967th Quartermaster Service Company
  - 3204th Quartermaster Service Company
  - 3205th Quartermaster Service Company
- 280th Quartermaster Battalion
  - 460th Amphibian Truck Company
  - 461st Amphibian Truck Company
  - 463rd Amphibian Truck Company
- 95th Quartermaster Battalion (Mobile)
  - 88th Quartermaster Railhead Company
  - 555th Quartermaster Railhead Company
  - 3820th Gas Supply Company

=== Campaign honors ===
- World War II
  - Normandy
  - Northern France
  - Rhineland
  - Central Europe

== Other amphibian units ==
=== Provisional Engineer Special Brigade Group ===
The Provisional Engineer Special Brigade Group was formed at Penllergaer, England, on 17 February 1944 to control Omaha Beach. It was commanded by Brigadier General William M. Hoge. Its main components were the 5th and 6th Engineer Special Brigades, and the 11th Port. For the D-Day landing it had a strength of 30,000 men. On 26 June it became the Omaha Beach Command.

=== 540th Engineer Combat Group ===
The 540th Engineer Shore Regiment was activated at Camp Edwards on 11 September 1942, and was rushed to Europe to participate in Operation Torch. The 3rd Battalion was inactivated at Camp Edwards on 3 October; thereafter it had only two battalions. It staged at Camp Kilmer, New Jersey, and departed the New York Port of Embarkation and the Hampton Roads Port of Embarkation on 23 October 1942. It was redesignated the 540th Engineer Combat Regiment on 25 October 1942, and assaulted French Northwest Africa on 8 November. It subsequently participated in the assault landings at Licata, Sicily, on 9 July 1943, at Salerno and Anzio in Italy on 9 September 1943 and 22 January 1944 respectively, and the invasion of Southern France on 15 August 1944. It was redesignated the 540th Engineer Combat Group on 15 February 1945, with its 1st and 2nd Battalions becoming the 2832nd and 2833rd Engineer Combat Battalions. It was inactivated on 25 October 1945. The 2832nd Engineer Combat Battalion returned to Camp Kilmer on 13 November 1945, where it was disbanded two days later. The 2833rd Engineer Combat Battalion returned to Camp Kilmer on 26 November 1945, and was disbanded on the following day.

=== 411th Engineer Special Shop Battalion ===
The 411th Engineer Base Shop Battalion was formed at Camp Edwards on 17 August 1942. A composite platoon from the battalion went to England with the 1st Engineer Amphibian Brigade. It departed the San Francisco Port of Embarkation on 17 January 1943, and arrived in Australia on 30 January. It moved to Cairns where it operated an assembly plant for LCVPs. On 5 June 1944 it moved to Milne Bay, where it operated a facility that assembled the larger LCMs. It was redesignated the 411th Engineer Special Shop Battalion on 1 November 1944. On 16 December it moved to Batangas in the Philippines, where a new LCM assembly plant was established. It returned to the San Francisco Port of Embarkation on 4 February 1946, and was inactivated at Camp Stoneman, California, two days later.

=== 692nd Engineer Special Shop Battalion ===
The 692nd Engineer Base Shop Battalion was formed at Camp Edwards on 15 May 1943. It was redesignated the 692nd Special Shop Battalion on 12 August. It departed the New Orleans Port of Embarkation on 10 February 1944, and arrived at Milne Bay on 25 February, where it assisted the 411th Engineer Base Shop Battalion in the operation of the LCM assembly plant there. It followed it to Batangas on 17 June 1945. It returned to the Los Angeles Port of Embarkation on 25 January 1945, and was inactivated at Camp Anza, California, two days later.
