= Long Island, Madang Province =

Volcanic island north of New Guinea

Long Island
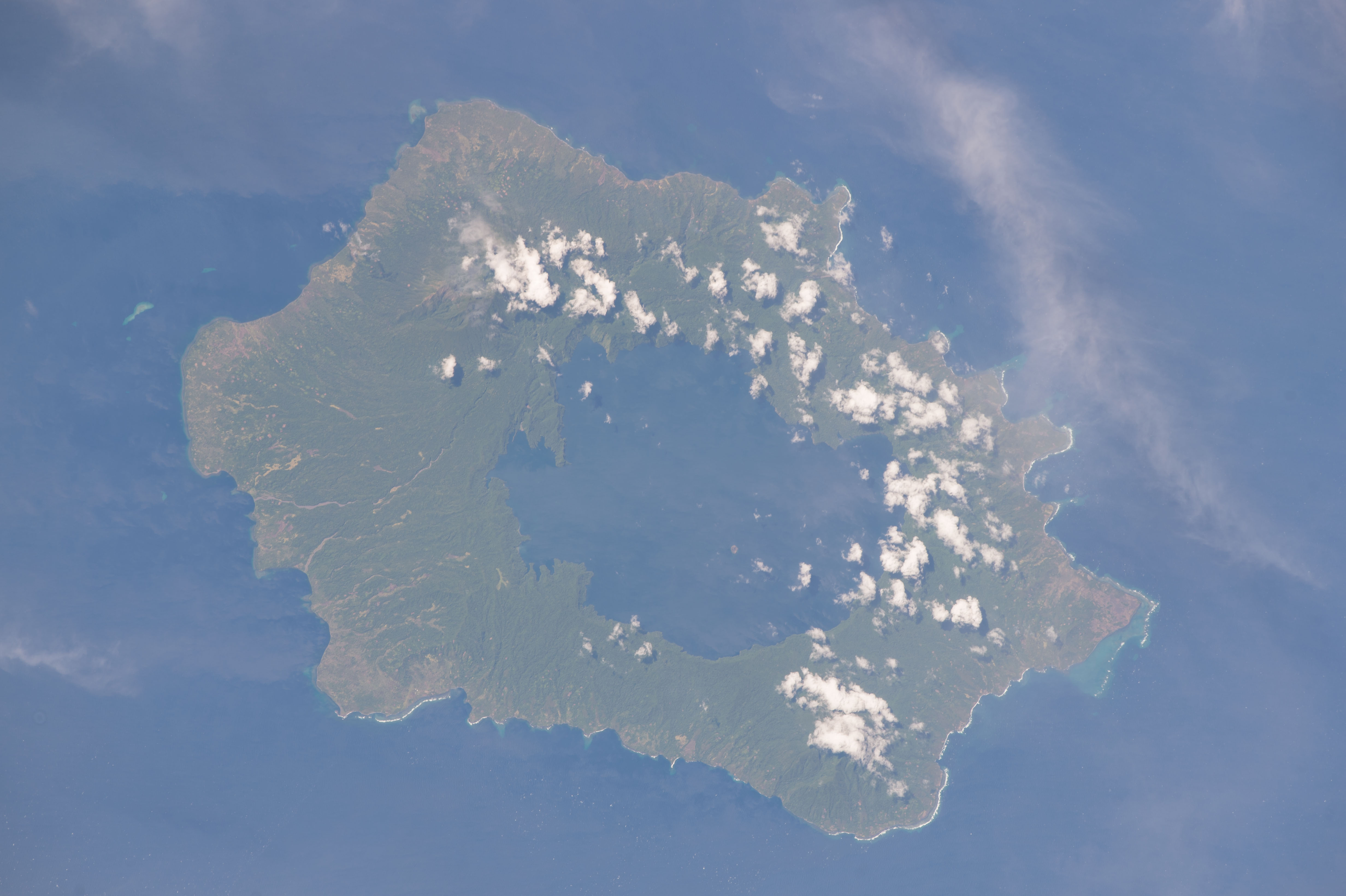

Highest point
- Elevation: 1,280 m (4,200 ft)
- Prominence: 1,280 m (4,200 ft)
- Coordinates: 5°21′S 147°7′E

Geography
- Location within Papua New Guinea
- Location: Papua New Guinea

Geology
- Mountain type: Complex volcano
- Last eruption: November 1993

Long Island (known locally as Pono, and as Arop or Ahrup on the New Guinean mainland) is a populated volcanic island in Madang Province, Papua New Guinea. It is located north of the island of New Guinea, separated from it by the Vitiaz Strait. The island's interior contains a 360 m-deep (1,180 ft) freshwater volcanic crater lake and within that lake exists an even smaller island known as Motmot island. During the late 17th or early 18th century virtually all of the biota on the island was destroyed and has subsequently provided scientists a unique opportunity to study recolonization efforts by plants, animals, and humans. The vast majority of the buildings on the island are constructed using vernacular architecture.

== Geography ==
Two stratovolcanoes are located on the island: Mount Reaumur and Cerisy Peak. The summit of the volcanic complex collapsed during at least three major explosive eruptions, about 16,000, 4000, and 300 years ago. These produced a large caldera 10 km × 12.5 km (6.2 mi × 7.8 mi) in size, now filled with a freshwater crater lake, Lake Wisdom. In 1953-1954 and 1968, volcanic activity created Motmot Island on the crater lake, 200 m × 200 m (650 ft × 650 ft) in size. The 1660 eruption was one of the largest in Papua New Guinea's recent history with an estimated air-fall volume in excess of 11 km^{3} (2.6 cu mi), comparable to the 1991 eruption of Mount Pinatubo, but the Global Volcanism Program gives a much higher estimate of 30 km^{3} (7.2 cu mi). This cataclysmic event prompted legends of a "Time of Darkness". The most recent (and a smaller) eruption occurred in 1993.

== Inhabitants ==
Based upon oral tradition Long Island was inhabited before the last major volcanic eruption that wiped out much of the island's biota. The inhabitants supposedly interpreted a warning signal from the volcano before its eruption and were able to flee to nearby surrounding islands, years later the descendants of the island's original inhabitants would begin a recolonization effort that continues today. Inhabited places on the island include Malala, Bok, Poin Kiau, Kaut, and Matapun with Malala being the original and primary settlement on the island. The local population regularly harvests eggs from three species of sea turtle, these are Eretmochelys imbricata bissa, Chelonia mydas, and less commonly, Dermochelys coriacea.

== Languages ==
The Arop-Lokep language is spoken by the island's inhabitants.

== History ==
According to findings by archaeologists, it is believed that the island was first inhabited by humans approximately 1000 years ago. The discovery of obsidian and pottery fragments from diverse cultures at these dig sites has provided compelling evidence of the island's inhabitants engaging in extensive trade networks, indicative of their active participation in regional trade routes. A single impressive human-like stone carving was discovered near the present-day settlement of Bok, the exact age of which is unknown.

Some historians, such as Riesenfeld (1950: 368–371, 671–673), believe that the first colonists to this island originally came from Umboi Island.

The first sighting by Europeans of Long Island was by the Spanish navigator Iñigo Órtiz de Retes on 12 August 1545 when on board of the carrack San Juan he tried to return from Tidore to New Spain.

Long Island was charted in 1643 by Abel Tasman but he mistook it for part of the New Guinea mainland.

During World War II, Long Island served as a crucial barge staging area for the Imperial Japanese forces. As part of the Battle of Cape Gloucester, on December 26, 1943, D Company of the 592d Engineer Boat and Shore Regiment, 2d Engineer Special Brigade of the US Army landed on Long Island with the objective of establishing a radar station. The Royal Australian Air Force No. 338 Radar Station was subsequently set up at Matfum Point and became operational on April 6, 1944. It remained in operation until March 1945, playing a vital role in the military operations of the time.

== Folklore ==
Early anthropologists observed that island inhabitants believe in a cargo cult creation myth. An early creation story was recorded in a 1897 edition of Deutsche Kolonialzeitung (10 (38) N.S.: 379–380).

Folklore relating to the volcanic eruption on Long Island and its subsequent ash fall have been recorded from surrounding areas such as Astrolabe Bay and the Rai Coast. The crater lake which was created by the eruption is also the subject of local folklore. Long islanders are quite superstitious about the lake and will seldom ever approach its shoreline as they believe another, stronger, race of humans lives nearby. Local disappearances are often blamed on these mysterious people.

== Flora ==
Owing to the comparatively arid environment caused by near-constant trade winds and unusually porous soil, researchers often remark on the lack of expected undergrowth compared to other forests in the region. There are currently 305 known vascular plant species on long island of which 32 are pteridophytes and 273 are spermatophytes. 31 different Ficus varieties were present on the island during the latest survey. Barringtonia speciosa is noted to be one of the most abundant trees on the island, likely due to the mechanism and ease in which its seeds are disseminated.

== Fauna ==
Long island is host to a wide variety of animal species including reptiles, birds, bats, rodents, and populations of feral pigs, cats, dogs, and chickens. The reptile population on long island is considered to be depauperate when compared to other nearby islands and this is often attributed to a relatively dry climate. A species of Cuscus was introduced to the island and is now considered abundant. Within the freshwater of lake wisdom four species of freshwater mollusk can be found, the most common being Melanoides tuberculatus. Two species of frog can be found on the island, these are Litoria infrafrenat and Platymantis papuensi. Crocodiles are often cited as being present in small numbers along the northern shore of Lake Wisdom.

Species count
| Species | Count |
|---|---|
| Frog | 2 |
| Crocodile | 1 |
| Snake | 1 |
| Varanid Lizard | 1 |
| Geckos | 5 |
| Skinks | 7 |
| Frogs | 2 |
| Land Birds | 50 |
| Doves | 8 |
| Rats | 2 |
| Bats | 8 |
| fresh-water mollusk | 4 |

== Lake Wisdom ==
Lake Wisdom is a crater lake and it was first discovered by Europeans in 1928. The lake takes its name from Brigadier General Evan. A. Wisdom, who was the administrator of Papua New Guinea from 1921 to 1933.

The crater holds water at a much higher level than the surrounding sea water. Aircraft surveying inside the crater with radar altimeters estimate the height of the water to be approximately 183–213 meters (600–699 ft), 190 meters (620 ft) higher than the water outside suggesting there is no channel or means of water transfer to Lake Wisdom.

=== Limnology ===
Between 1969 and 1976, limnological data was gathered from Lake Wisdom during seven visits. The lake's surface temperature remained steady at 28 °C (82 °F), with a gradual decrease to 26–27 °C (79–81 °F) at a depth of 60 m (200 ft). However, there was a relatively quick drop of about 1 °C (1.8 °F) between depths of 10 and 20 m (33 and 66 ft). One notable characteristic of the lake is the high concentration of oxygen in its deepest parts. Living chironomid larvae and mollusks were found at depths of up to 360 m (1,180 ft). The amount of light that penetrates the lake varies significantly, depending on rainfall and the volcanic activity of Motmot, a secondary cone within the lake.

== See also ==
- List of volcanoes in Papua New Guinea
- Timeline of volcanism on Earth
