= 3rd Maneuver Enhancement Brigade =

3d Maneuver Enhancement Brigade
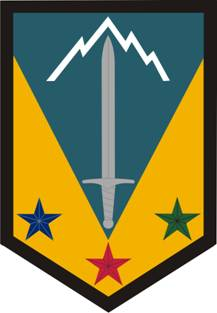
- 3d Maneuver Enhancement Brigade shoulder sleeve insignia
- Active: 2008? - 16 September 2011
- Country: United States
- Branch: U.S. Army
- Part of: FORSCOM
- Garrison/HQ: Fort Richardson

Insignia
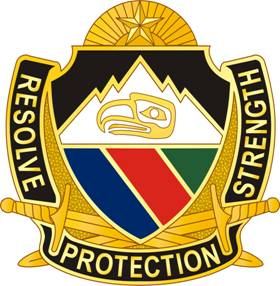
- Distinctive Unit Insignia

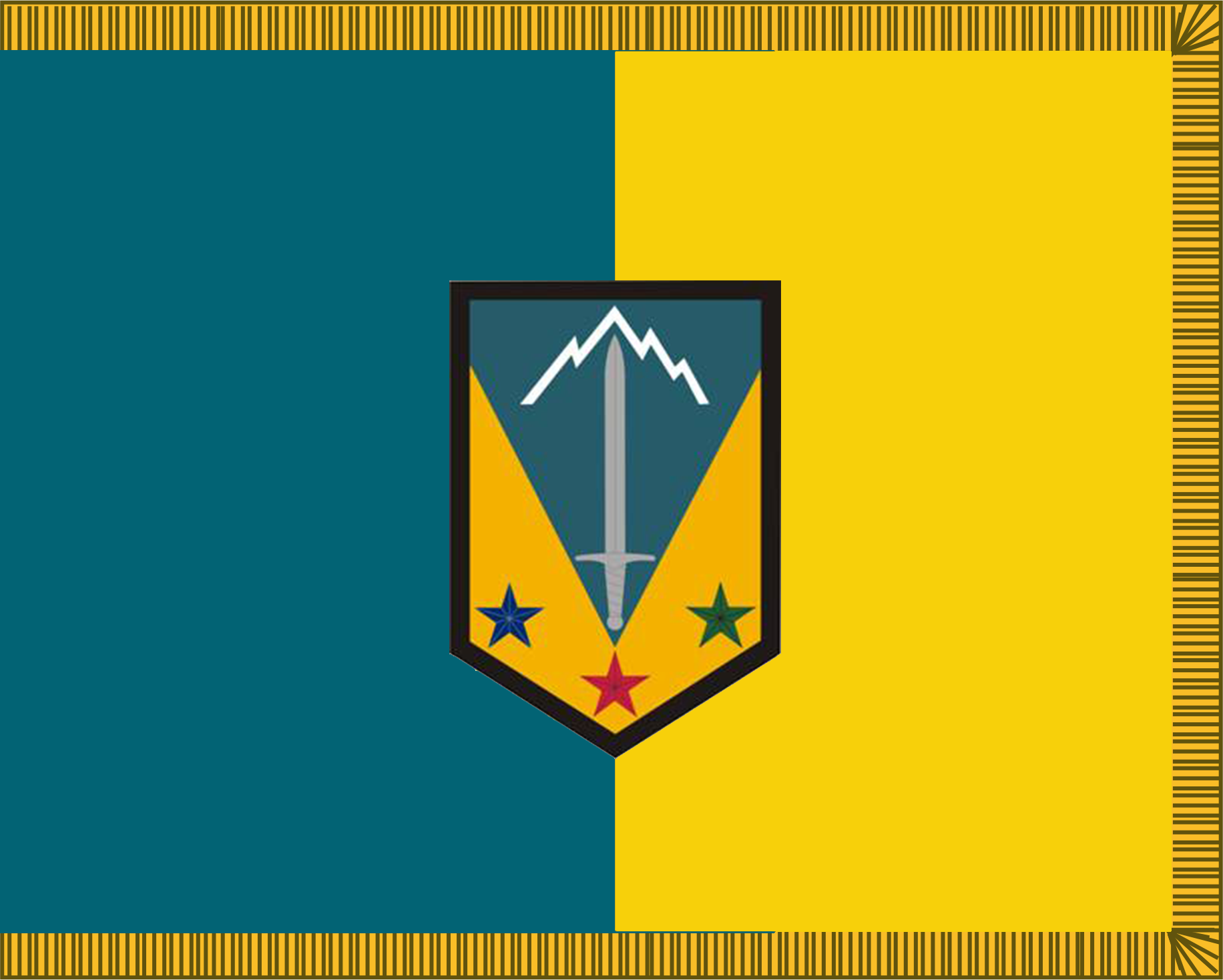
- 3rd Maneuver Enhancement Brigade Flag

The 3d Maneuver Enhancement Brigade (3d MEB) was a United States Army brigade located at Fort Richardson, Alaska. The 3d MEB was one of three active duty Maneuver Enhancement Brigades. The Brigade was tasked to improve the movement capabilities and rear area security for commanders at division level or higher. It was inactivated in 2011 and replaced by the 2d Engineer Brigade.

The 3d MEB was composed of:

- Headquarters & Headquarters Company
- 6th Engineer Battalion
- 793d Military Police Battalion
- 17th Combat Sustainment Support Battalion
