= 37th Engineer Battalion (United States) =

Airborne combat engineer battalion in the United States Army

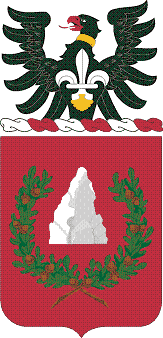
- Coat of arms
- Active: 1918–1919; 1941–1945; 1954–1958; 1987–2010; 2013–2024
- Country: United States
- Branch: US Army Corps of Engineers
- Type: Combat, airborne
- Role: Combat Engineer
- Size: Battalion
- Part of: 2nd Brigade Combat Team, 82nd Airborne Division
- Garrison/HQ: Fort Bragg (North Carolina, USA)
- Nickname: "Eagle Battalion"(special designation)
- Mottos: Fortuna Infortuna Forti Una (Fortune or Misfortune is all the same to a man of stout heart)
- Engagements: Normandy landings Operation Desert Storm; Operation Iraqi Freedom; Operation Enduring Freedom

Insignia
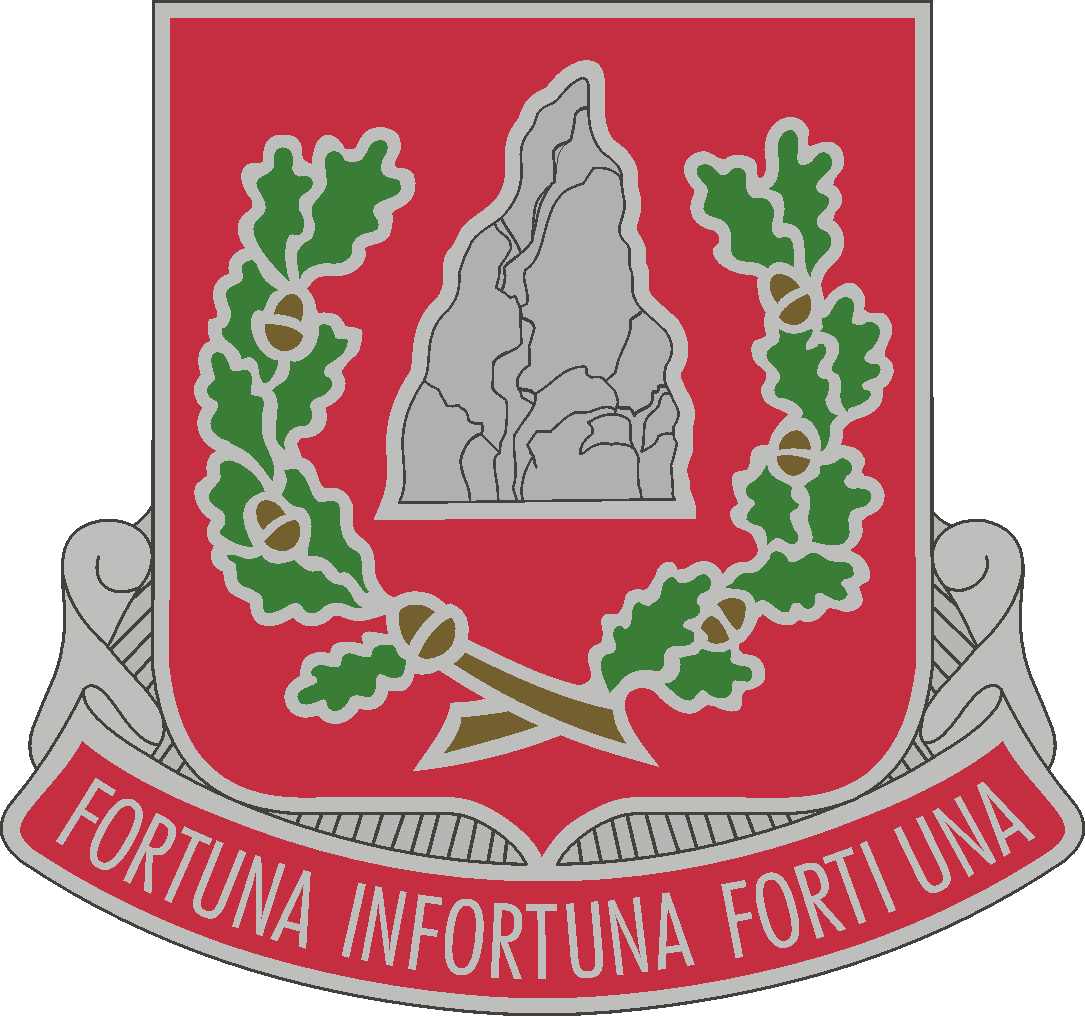
- Distinctive unit insignia

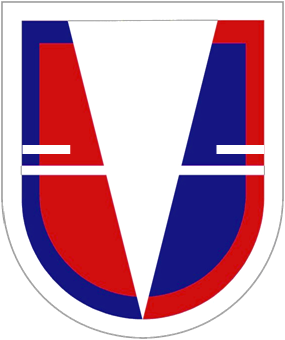
- Unit beret flash

The 37th Engineer Battalion ("Eagle Battalion") was an airborne engineer battalion in the United States Army, subordinate to the 2d Brigade Combat Team, 82d Airborne Division, based at Fort Bragg, North Carolina. The 37th Engineer Battalion was reactivated in the 82d Airborne Division as part of the United States Army new BCT 2020 concept in which each BCT's Special Troops Battalions would be inactivated and reactivated as Brigade Engineer Battalions. Prior to this, the battalion was a subordinate unit of the 20th Engineer Brigade assigned to XVIII Airborne Corps.

The battalion is notable in that it was the only battalion, of any kind, in the history of the United States Army to have entered combat as both an officially designated amphibious and airborne unit (though the Glider Infantry Regiments of the 11th Airborne Division conducted amphibious assaults in World War II).

== Unit History – World War I; World War II ==
The 37th Engineer Battalion was first activated on 16 January 1918, as 1st Battalion, 37th Engineer Regiment, whose primary function was electrical and mechanical engineering. During World War I, the battalion participated in the Battle of Saint-Mihiel and the Meuse-Argonne Offensive as a member of the American Expeditionary Force. Following the war, the 37th Engineer Regiment was inactivated in March 1919.

Reactivated in January 1941, the regiment underwent mobilization and training in several locations, and was eventually broken up on 18 March 1943, into the 1106th Engineer Combat Group, the 209th Engineer Combat Battalion, and the 37th Engineer Combat Battalion (Amphibious). The 37th Engineer Combat Battalion was subsequently assigned to the 5th Engineer Special Brigade and participated in Operation Overlord, landing with the initial waves on Omaha Beach. For its performance, the battalion was awarded the Presidential Unit Citation and the French Croix de Guerre with Palm.

After the Invasion of Normandy, the battalion spent several months on the beach unloading troops and equipment, clearing roads, and repairing port facilities. For this, the battalion received the Meritorious Unit Commendation. Later, the battalion was detached from the 5th Engineer Special Brigade and moved through Belgium and the Netherlands, supporting the Allied advance. The battalion entered Germany in March 1945, where it remained until its return to the United States in November of that same year. The following month, the battalion was again inactivated.

== Timeline since World War II ==
28 October 1954 – redesignated as 37th Engineer Battalion (Combat).

17 December 1954 – activated in Germany.

31 December 1958 – inactivated.

16 August 1987 – reactivated at Fort Bragg, North Carolina, and assigned to the 20th Engineer Brigade.

13 October 1990 – deployed to Saudi Arabia (Operation Desert Shield; Operation Desert Storm).

27 September 1994 – deployed to Haiti (Operation Uphold Democracy).

11 May 2001 – elements attached to the 11th Engineer Battalion and deployed to Kosovo (Operation Joint Guardian) in support of the 101st Airborne Division (Air Assault).

22 September 2002 – deployed 20 soldiers from Vertical and Light Equipment platoons to Kuwait (Operation Enduring Freedom) in support of the Combined Joint Task Force at Camp Doha. Redeployed to Fort Bragg on 22 March 2003. Deployed soldiers received Joint Service Medals and Joint Meritorious Unit Citations (permanent).

22 March 2003 – deployed to Northern Iraq (Operation Iraqi Freedom) in support of the 101st Airborne Division (Air Assault). For its actions in Iraq, the battalion received the Meritorious Unit Commendation (1st Oak Leaf Cluster).

10 March 2006 – deployed to Afghanistan (Operation Enduring Freedom) in support of Combined/Joint Task Force 76, 10th Mountain Division (Light Infantry) and formed Task Force Eagle, the first US, Joint and Coalition Engineer Task Force in the CJOA. In addition to standard engineer operations, the battalion repeatedly engaged Taliban and other enemy forces and is credited with over 105 enemy killed. Redeployed to Fort Bragg on 11 March 2007.

The Battalion lost First Sergeant Christopher C. Rafferty in support of (Operation Enduring Freedom). He was fatally injured while coordinating a response to a mortar strike July, 21st 2006 in Sharana, Afghanistan. The Battalion held a ceremony on Rafferty Field named in his honor after their redeployment back to Ft. Bragg.

On 5 June 2009 – deployed to Iraq in support of Operation Iraqi Freedom. The battalion served as an echelon above BCT unit assigned to the USF-I EN BDE, operating throughout Iraq with missions focused in northern and western Iraq primarily in support of the 1st BCT, 25th Infantry Division and the 3d BCT, 2d Infantry Division in Diyala, the 1st BCT, 82d Airborne Division in Al Anbar and the 3d Squadron, 4th Cavalry Regiment and 1st Battalion, 28th Infantry Regiment in Salah ad Din provinces. The battalion formed the basis of Joint Task Force Eagle Headquartered at Joint Base Balad and composed of over 1000 soldiers and airmen. JTF Eagle elements were also based at Forward Operating Bases Warhorse, Al Asad and Ramadi. The Joint Task Force included the 887th Engineer Company (Support), Fort Campbell, KY; 50th Engineer Company (Multi-Role, Bridge), Fort Leonard Wood, MO; the 739th Engineer Company (Multi-Role, Bridge), Granite City, IL; Terrain Team, 70th Engineer Company (Topographic), Schofield Barracks, HI; Air Force Detachment 6 (TACON); Facilities Engineer Team 2 (DS); 732d Expeditionary Civil Engineer Squadron and 266th Military Police Company (OPCON), Manassas, VA. Joint Task Force Eagle's mission focused on partnering with Iraqi Army engineers, building capacity, IED defeat operations, construction, bridging, general engineering, and security.

The colors of the 37th Engineer Battalion were inactivated again effective 16 September 2010 when the unit was reflagged as the 307th.

The 37th Engineer Battalion was officially reactivated as part of the 2d Brigade Combat Team, 82d Airborne Division on 16 October 2013. This was accomplished by inactivating and reorganizing the Special Troops Battalion ("Green Falcons"), 2d BCT. A ceremony was held on 15 November 2013 at Fort Bragg, NC, to case the colors of the STB and to uncase the colors and activate the 37th Engineer Battalion ("Eagle Battalion").

On 16 October 2024, the 37th Engineer Battalion cased its colors in a deactivation ceremony at Fort Bragg as part of the Army's transformation from a brigade focused maneuver unit to a division-level maneuver units. The 37th's Sappers are consolidating its engineer assets into an airborne combat engineer company that will become part of the 82nd Airborne Division's new engineer battalion.

== Campaigns ==
- St. Mihiel
- Meuse-Argonne
- Normandy (with Arrowhead)
- Northern France
- Central Europe
- Rhineland
- Defense of Saudi Arabia
- Liberation and Defense of Kuwait
- Operation Iraqi Freedom "Liberation of Iraq"
- Operation Enduring Freedom "Consolidation I"
- Operation Iraqi Freedom "National Resolution"
- Operation Inherent Resolve

== See also ==
- 20th Engineer Brigade (United States)
- Engineer Special Brigade
- Sapper (Combat Engineer)
