= Eugene M. Caffey =

American army officer (1895–1961)

Eugene Mead Caffey
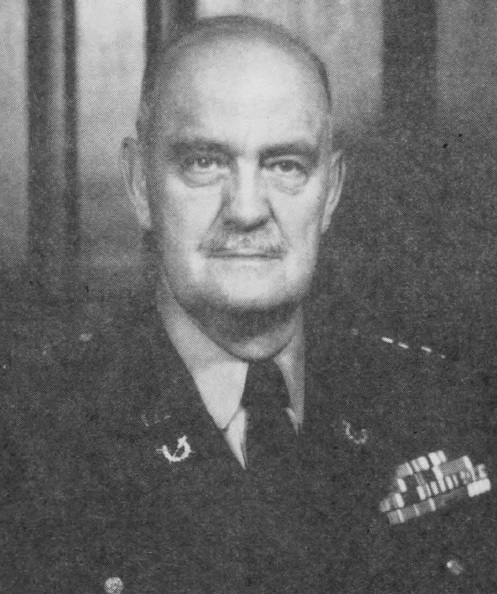
- Caffey in 1954
- Born: December 21, 1895; Decatur, Georgia, U.S.
- Died: May 30, 1961 (aged 65) Las Cruces, New Mexico, U.S.
- Allegiance: United States
- Branch: United States Army
- Service years: 1918–1956
- Rank: Major General
- Commands: 20th Engineer Combat Regiment; Judge Advocate General of the United States Army
- Conflicts: World War I; World War II; Operation Torch; Tunisia Campaign; Italian Campaign; Operation Husky; Northern France Campaign; Operation Overlord
- Awards: Distinguished Service Cross; Silver Star; Purple Heart

Eugene Mead Caffey (December 21, 1895 – May 30, 1961) was an American Colonel in the United States Army during World War II, and he later served as Judge Advocate General of the United States Army. He was a recipient of the Distinguished Service Cross for heroism in World War II, and retired as Major General.

== Early life ==
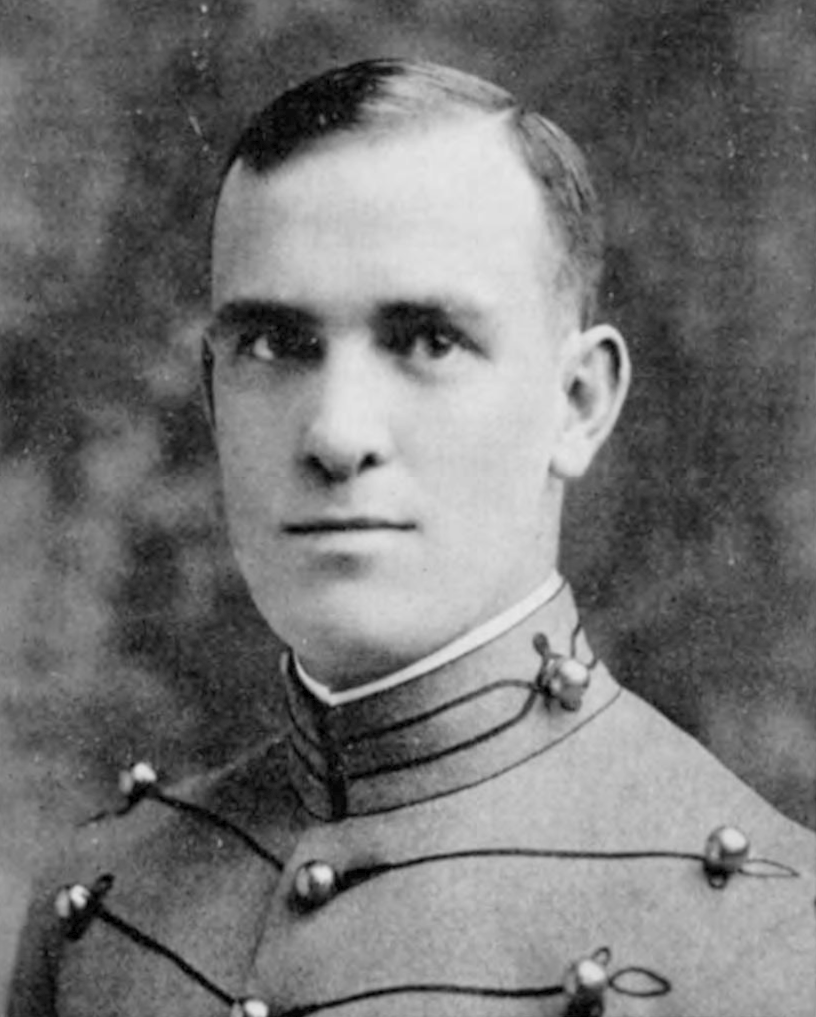
At West Point in 1918

Caffey was born in Decatur, Georgia, on December 21, 1895, the eldest son of Lochlin Washington and Helen Mead Caffey. His father entered the Army during the Spanish–American War, remained on active duty, and retired as a colonel.

Eugene Caffey graduated from the United States Military Academy in 1918 and received his commission as a second lieutenant of Engineers. Because of the expansion of the Army during United States involvement in World War I, he received temporary promotions to first lieutenant and captain. By the time the war ended in November 1918, Caffey was commander of a company in the 213th Engineer Regiment at Camp Lewis, Washington.

== Early career ==
In October 1918, a fellow officer, Alexander P. Cronkhite, died after being shot at a Camp Lewis training area. Investigation determined that the shooting was self-inflicted and accidental. Cronkhite's father, Major General Adelbert Cronkhite, did not accept this finding, and eventually succeeded at having the investigation reopened. Two soldiers who were with Alexander Cronkhite when he died were subsequently charged with his killing—a sergeant and a captain. Because the captain was Jewish, antisemitic media outlets waged a public campaign against him.

At the October 1924 trial of the sergeant, federal prosecutors argued that the shooting could not have been accidental, because the distance and angle from which Alexander Cronkhite was shot made it impossible for him to have done it himself. During his testimony, Caffey, who had been friendly with Alexander Cronkhite, demonstrated that not only could the shooting have been accidental, but that it was easy to create a series of plausible events which could have resulted in Alexander Cronkhite pulling the trigger by mistake. The prosecution's case collapsed, the sergeant was acquitted, and charges against the captain were soon dropped.

Caffey subsequently served in Panama and Chile, and was also a member of a survey team which attempted to locate a route for a canal through Nicaragua. After returning to the United States, he transferred to the Judge Advocate General's Corps, graduated from the University of Virginia School of Law, and attained admission to the bar. He then served as an Army attorney at Fort Bliss, Texas, at the War Department, and in the Philippines.

== World War II ==
Caffey returned to the Engineer branch shortly before World War II, assigned to the 20th Engineer Combat Regiment as executive officer with the rank of colonel. He took part in Operation Torch, saw combat in Tunisia in early 1943, and received the Silver Star and Purple Heart. In May 1943, Caffey became commander of the 1st Engineer Special Brigade and participated in the Allied invasions of Sicily and mainland Italy. (Engineer Special Brigades were large organizations which were responsible for transferring equipment and personnel off the beachheads and making them available for assault operations.) He took part in the landings at Normandy in June 1944, and was one of the first soldiers to come ashore at Utah Beach. Caffey was awarded the Distinguished Service Cross for his extraordinary heroism on D-Day.

== Post-World War II ==
After the war Caffey returned to the JAG Corps. He served first as executive officer and chief of the administrative division in the Office of the Judge Advocate General, and then as Staff Judge Advocate for Third United States Army at Fort McPherson, Georgia.

Caffey intended to retire in 1953, but withdrew his request after receiving promotion to brigadier general and assignment as Assistant Judge Advocate General for Civil Law. He served in this position for only six months; in January 1954, he was nominated to serve as the Judge Advocate General and received a promotion to major general.

In January 1956 Caffey spoke to the Georgia General Assembly; in his remarks he praised a speech by Congressman Jack Flynt which favored racial segregation. The National Association for the Advancement of Colored People and other advocates of civil rights protested. Wilbur Brucker, the Secretary of the Army suggested that Caffey should retire; despite having two years left on his four-year term, he opted for retirement in December 1956.

== Later years ==
Caffey retired to Las Cruces, New Mexico, where he practiced law until ill health compelled him to retire. He died in Las Cruces on May 30, 1961, and was buried at the Masonic cemetery there.

== Awards ==
- Distinguished Service Cross in 1945 as Colonel in the 1st Engineer Special Brigade
- Silver Star Medal in 1943 as Colonel and Commanding officer of the 20th Engineer Combat Regiment, 9th Infantry Division
- Legion of Merit with two bronze oak leaf clusters
- Bronze Star Medal
- Purple Heart
- Officer of the Order of the British Empire
- Croix de Guerre (1939–1945) with two palms
- Ordre du Mérite Maritime

=== Distinguished Service Cross narrative ===
Colonel Caffey landed with the first wave of the forces assaulting the enemy-held beaches. Finding that the landing had been made on other than the planned beaches, he selected appropriate landing beaches, redistributed the area assigned to shore parties of the 1st Engineer Special Brigade, and set them at work to establish routes inland through the sea wall and minefields to reinsure the rapid landing and passage inshore of the following waves. He frequently went on the beaches under heavy shell fire to force incoming troops to disperse and move promptly off the shore and away from the water sides to places of concealment and greater safety further back. His courage and his presence in the very front of the attack, coupled with his calm disregard of hostile fire, inspired the troops to heights of enthusiasm and self-sacrifice. Under his experienced and unfaltering leadership, the initial error in landing off-course was promptly overcome, confusion was prevented, and the forces necessary to a victorious assault were successfully and expeditiously landed and cleared from the beaches with a minimum of casualties. He thus contributed, in a marked degree, to the seizing of the beachhead in France.

=== Distinguished Service Cross citation ===
"The President of the United States takes pleasure in presenting the Distinguished Service Cross to Eugene M. Caffey, Colonel (Corps of Engineers), U.S. Army, for extraordinary heroism in connection with military operations against an armed enemy while serving with the 1st Engineer Special Brigade, in action against enemy forces on 6 June 1944, in France. Colonel Caffey's intrepid actions, personal bravery and zealous devotion to duty exemplify the highest traditions of the military forces of the United States and reflect great credit upon himself, his unit, and the United States Army."
