= 2nd Engineer Brigade (United States) =

2nd Engineer Amphibian Brigade 2nd Engineer Special Brigade 2nd Amphibious Support Brigade 2nd Engineer Brigade
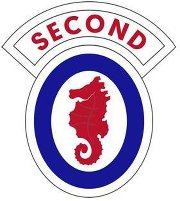
- 2nd Engineer Brigade Shoulder Sleeve Insignia
- Active: 1942–1955; 1956–1965; 2011–2015
- Country: United States
- Branch: United States Army
- Type: Engineer
- Size: Brigade
- Part of: USARAK
- Garrison/HQ: Fort Richardson, Alaska
- Nickname: Arctic Trailblazers
- Colors: Blue, Red, and white
- Engagements: World War II; Korean War; War in Afghanistan

Insignia
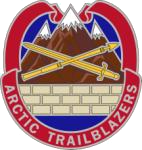
- Distinctive unit insignia

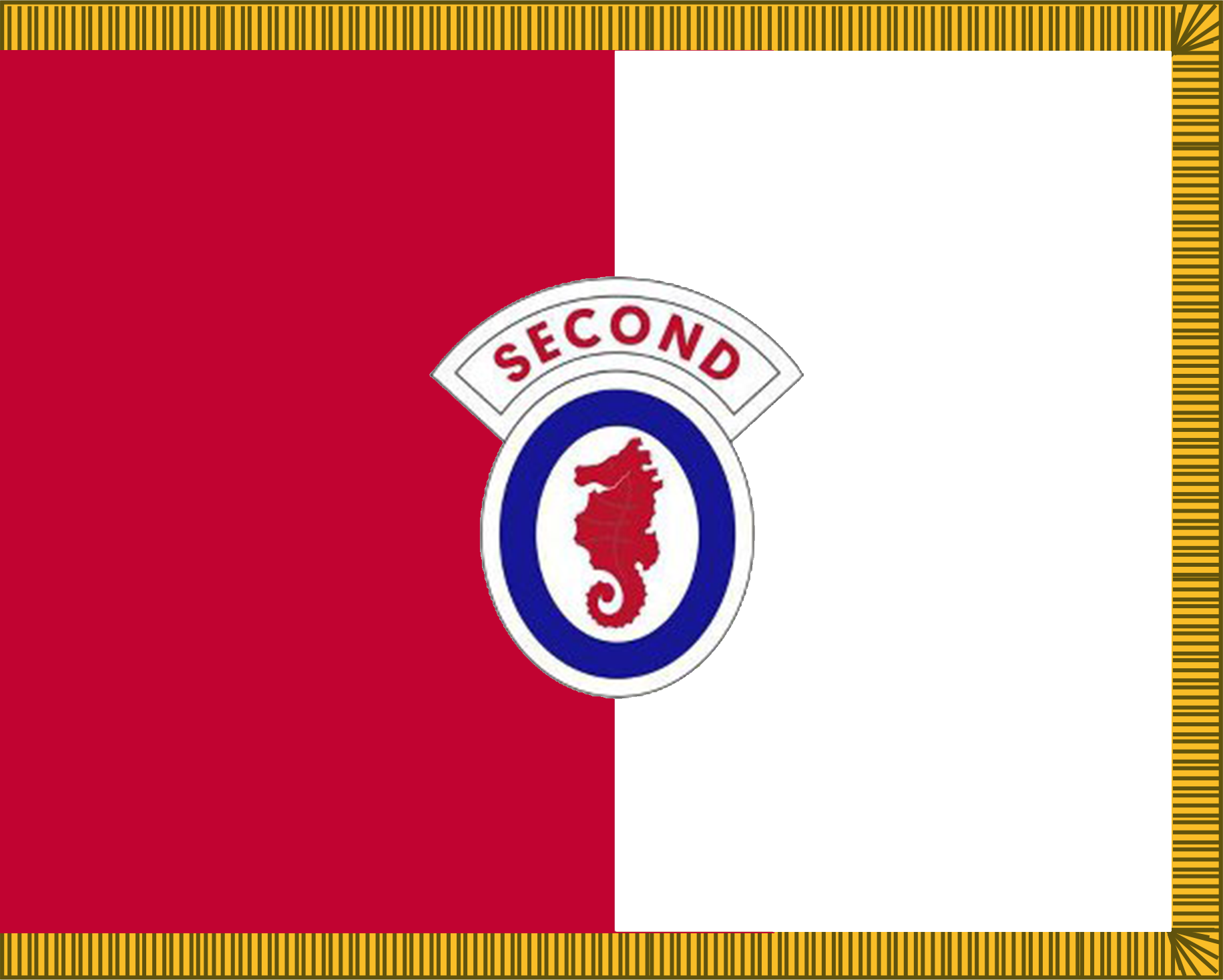
- 2nd Engineer Brigade Flag

The 2nd Engineer Brigade was a military engineering brigade of the United States Army, that was subordinate to United States Army Alaska and had its headquarters at Fort Richardson, Alaska, prior to deactivation in 2015.

== History ==
=== World War II ===
The 2nd Engineer Amphibian Brigade was activated at Camp Edwards on 20 June 1942, with the 532nd Engineer Shore Regiment and 592nd Engineer Boat Regiment assigned. Colonel William F. Heavey, who was appointed its commander on 6 August 1942, and was promoted to brigadier general on 10 September, led the brigade for the rest of the war. It quickly expanded to 6,000 men, but lost 1,500 in September to the 540th Shore Regiment. On 1 October, the brigade was reorganized; the 532nd and 592nd became engineer amphibian regiments and the 542nd Engineer Amphibian Regiment was formed. The brigade, less the 542nd Engineer Amphibian Regiment, moved by rail to Camp Carrabelle on 15 October. On 7 November, the brigade moved to Fort Ord, California, where it was joined by the 542nd Engineer Amphibian Regiment the following day. In January and February 1943, the brigade embarked from the San Francisco Port of Embarkation on a series of vessels bound for Australia.

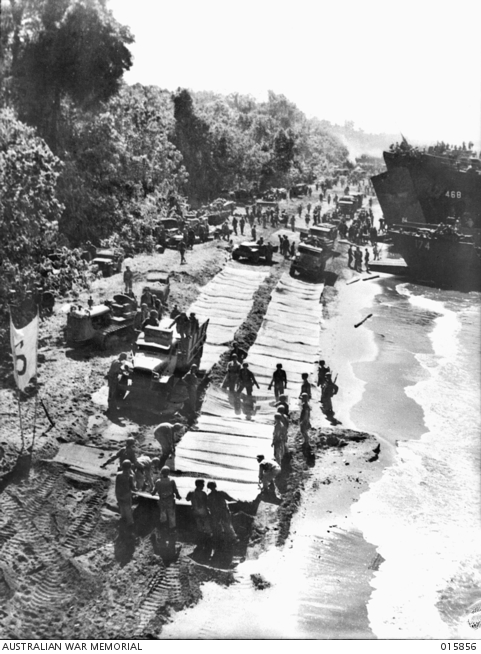
The US 532nd Engineer Boat and Shore Regiment lays beach mats to allow vehicles to move along the sand at Red Beach, near Lae

In Australia, the brigade was based at Cairns, although its headquarters was co-located with that of I Corps in Rockhampton, 600 miles (970 km) away. The brigade helped the 411th Base Shop Battalion establish a landing craft construction facility, which produced its first finished LCVP on 7 April. In May, elements of the brigade began moving to New Guinea. A detachment of ten LCMs of the 592nd Engineer Amphibian Regiment went to Port Moresby, where it moved supplies to the Lakekamu River. They were followed by detachments of the 532nd and 542nd, which moved to Milne Bay, Oro Bay and Samarai. On 30 June, the brigade participated in its first amphibious operation, the landing at Nassau Bay. On 4 July, the brigade was renamed the 2nd Engineer Special Brigade, and its three regiments became engineer boat and shore regiments.

The 2nd Engineer Special Brigade trained at Cairns with the Australian 9th Division in June and July 1943. The 532nd Engineer Boat and Shore Regiment then moved to New Guinea, and landed part of the 9th Division at Red Beach near Lae on 4 September. On 22 September, it landed elements of the 9th Division at Scarlet Beach near Finschhafen. On 11 October, four Japanese barges attempted to land on Scarlet Beach. They were defeated by men of the 532nd Engineer Boat and Shore Regiment, including Private Junior Van Noy, who was posthumously awarded the Medal of Honor.

Over the next few months, units of the 2nd Engineer Special Brigade participated in the landings at Arawe, Long Island, Saidor, Sio, Los Negros, Talasea, Hollandia, Wakde and Biak. On 20 October 1944 it participated in the amphibious assault on Leyte in the Philippines. Over the following months it participated in a series of amphibious operations to liberate the Philippines. Nine of the 2nd Engineer Special Brigade's units were awarded Presidential Unit Citations.

==== Organization ====
- Brigade Headquarters
- 532nd Engineer Boat and Shore Regiment
- 542nd Engineer Boat and Shore Regiment
- 592nd Engineer Boat and Shore Regiment
- 562nd Engineer Boat Maintenance Battalion
  - 1458th Engineer Maintenance Company
  - 1459th Engineer Maintenance Company
  - 1460th Engineer Maintenance Company
  - 1570th Engineer Heavy Equipment Shop Company
  - 1762nd Engineer Parts Supply Platoon
- 262nd Medical Battalion
- 162nd Ordnance Maintenance Company
- 189th Quartermaster Gas Supply Company
- 287th Signal Company
- 695th Truck Company
- 3498th Ordnance Medium Maintenance Company
- 5204th Transportation Corps Amphibious Truck Company
- Medical Detachment, 2nd Engineer Special Brigade
- Support Battery (Provisional) 2nd Engineer Special Brigade
- 416th Army Service Forces Band

=== Korean War ===
The 2nd Engineer Special Brigade arrived back in San Francisco on 16 December 1945, and returned to Fort Ord. It later moved to Fort Worden, Washington, where it was stationed when the Korean War broke out in June 1950. The brigade moved to Yokohama, Japan, and participated in the landing at Inchon in September 1950. Afterwards it operated the ports of Suyong and Ulsan. The brigade was redesignated as the 2nd Amphibious Support Brigade on 26 June 1952. In December 1953 it moved to Camp McGill in Japan, where it was inactivated on 24 June 1955.

The brigade was reactivated at Fort Belvoir, Virginia as the 2nd Amphibious Support Command, on 13 November 1956, and inactivated at Fort Story, Virginia, on 25 August 1965.

=== Afghanistan ===
The brigade was reactivated as the 2nd Engineer Brigade from the 3rd Maneuver Enhancement Brigade, on 16 September 2011. Although no longer an amphibian brigade, it wore the World War II-era seahorse emblem until inactivated there on 15 May 2015.

== Structure in 2011 ==
- 2nd Engineer Brigade
  - 17th Combat Sustainment Support Battalion
  - 6th Engineer Battalion
  - 793rd Military Police Battalion
  - 9th Army Band
  - United States Army Alaska NCO Academy
