= William F. Heavey =

United States Army general

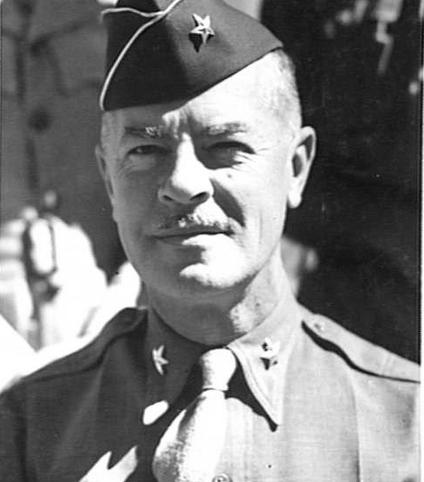
- Brigadier General William F. Heavey at Lake Barrine, Queensland, June 15, 1943.
- Born: 29 January 1896; Fort McPherson, Georgia, United States
- Died: 11 March 1974 (aged 78); Washington, D.C., United States
- Burial place: West Point Cemetery, West Point, New York, United States
- Military career
- Allegiance: United States
- Branch: United States Army
- Service years: 1917–1947
- Rank: Brigadier General
- Service number: 0-5223
- Unit: Corps of Engineers
- Commands: 1st Battalion, 5th Engineer Regiment; 20th Combat Engineers Regiment; 2nd Engineer Special Brigade
- Conflicts: World War I: Second Battle of the Marne; World War II: New Guinea campaign; Philippines campaign; Occupation of Japan
- Awards: Army Distinguished Service Medal; Legion of Merit; Bronze Star; Commendation Ribbon; Purple Heart (3)

Brigadier General William Francis Heavey (29 January 1896 – 11 March 1974) was a United States Army officer who commanded the 2nd Engineer Special Brigade in the South West Pacific Area during World War II. A West Point graduate, he entered the army engineers in 1917 and fought in World War I. He continued in the army during the 1920s and 1930s and was quickly promoted to brigadier general in 1942. After the war he became a consulting engineer and managed the Port of Houston.

== Biography ==
William Francis Heavey was born at Fort McPherson, Georgia, on 29 January 1896, the eldest of three sons son of a United States Army officer, John W. Heavey, and his wife Julia (née Baggett). Heavey grew up on various Army posts, and graduated from Cheyenne High School in 1912. He entered the United States Military Academy at West Point on 14 June 1913. His father, who became a brigadier general, was a West Point graduate, of the class of 1891, and his younger brothers Thomas J. Heavey and Wade H. Heavey would become graduates too, eventually rising to the rank of colonel. At West Point he was captain of the polo team, and a Cadet Captain. He met Julia Melcher, a New York stage actress, on a blind date at the Army–Navy Game. They were married in 1918.

Due to the American entry into World War I, Heavey's class graduated early on 20 April 1917. He was ranked third in his class, and although he wanted to follow his father into the infantry, the top graduates in his class were commissioned into the United States Army Corps of Engineers as second lieutenants. His fellow graduates included future general officers such as Matthew Ridgway, J. Lawton Collins, Mark W. Clark, Ernest N. Harmon, Norman Cota, William W. Eagles, John M. Devine and Charles S. Kilburn. Heavey was promoted to captain on 15 May 1917, and posted to the newly-formed 6th Engineer Regiment. It was then at Camp American University, but departed for France on 1 December 1917. He was assistant to the Chief Engineer, Advance Section, Line of Communications, from 25 January to 23 April 1918, when he returned to his regiment, which was then in the vicinity of Amiens as part of the Australian Corps. It rejoined the 3rd Division on 30 May, and participated in the Second Battle of the Marne. He was wounded on 15 July, but was back in action again on 26 July. Heavey was promoted to major on 23 August 1918, and returned to the United States, becoming an instructor at Camp A. A. Humphreys on 18 September 1918. The war ended soon after, due to the armistice of 11 November 1918.

With the war over, Heavy was reduced in rank to captain on 16 February 1920, and posted to West Point as an instructor in August. He entered the Massachusetts Institute of Technology on 7 June 1921, and graduated on 6 June 1922 with a Bachelor of Science degree in civil engineering. He was Assistant District Engineer at Louisville, Kentucky from 1 September 1922 to 14 August 1924, and then returned to Fort Humphreys as an instructor in tactics at the U.S. Army Engineer School. While there he graduated from the Company Officers' Course in 1926. He commanded the 7th Engineer Regiment at Fort Benning, Georgia, for two years from 7 August 1928, and then the 2nd Battalion, 11th Engineer Regiment at Corozal, in the Panama Canal Zone until 11 October 1930.

Returning to the United States on 31 December 1931, Heavey was posted to Washington, D.C., for duty with the Construction Section in the Office of the Chief of Engineers. On 31 March 1932, he became Assistant Division Engineer of the Great Lakes Division, based in Cleveland, Ohio. He was promoted to major again on 31 May 1932. He returned to Washington for duty with the Personnel Section in the Office of the Chief of Engineers from 31 July 1935 to 30 June 1937, and attended the United States Army Command and General Staff College from 14 August 1937 to 10 June 1938, followed by the Field Officers' course at Fort Belvoir from 1 July to 6 August 1938. He then returned to Fort Benning as commander of the 1st Battalion, 5th Engineer Regiment.

Promoted to lieutenant colonel on 1 May 1940, Heavy became commander of the 20th Engineer Regiment in November 1940. In July 1941, he became Chief Engineer of IV Corps, with the rank of colonel from 11 December 1941. He became commander of the 2nd Engineer Amphibian Brigade (later renamed the 2nd Engineer Special Brigade) on 8 August 1942, with the rank of brigadier general from 10 September 1942. He remained with this formation for the rest of the war, as it moved from Camp Edwards, Massachusetts, to Camp Carrabelle, Florida, and then to the South West Pacific Area in January 1943. There, the 2nd Engineer Special Brigade participated in 82 amphibious operations. Heavey was wounded in the New Guinea campaign and in the Battle of Leyte. He received the Distinguished Service Medal, Legion of Merit, Bronze Star Medal, Commendation Ribbon and two Oak Leaf Clusters to the Purple Heart he had won in World War I.

After the war, the 2nd Engineer Special Brigade participated in the Occupation of Japan from September to December 1945, then returned to the United States. Heavey's appointment as brigadier general in the Army of the United States was terminated on 5 March 1946, and he reverted to his substantive rank of colonel. He became District Engineer of the New York District. On 31 January 1948, he was retired at his own request, and was promoted to brigadier general on the Retired List on 16 August 1948. He published a book about the 2nd Engineer Special Brigade's experiences, titled Down Ramp! The Story of the Army Amphibian Engineers in 1947.

Heavey became a consulting engineer for the Port Authority of New York and New Jersey. He drew up a master plan for the modernization of the wharves and piers, and participated in the design of the new New York International Airport. He also served as a consulting engineer for the Hoover Commission. In June 1948 he became the General Manager of the Port of Houston. He was president of its World Trade Association, president of the Texas Ports Association, and vice president of the American Association of Port Authorities. He died at his home in Washington, D.C., on 11 March 1974. He was survived by his wife, Julia Melcher Heavey, who died in 1999, and two sons, William F. Heavey Jr., and John Melcher Healey. His papers are in Syracuse University in New York.

== Dates of rank ==
Insignia	Rank	Component	Date	Source
	Second Lieutenant	Corps of Engineers	20 April 1917	
	First Lieutenant	Corps of Engineers	15 May 1917	
	Captain	Corps of Engineers	15 May 1917	
	Major	Corps of Engineers	23 August 1918	
	Captain	Corps of Engineers	16 February 1920	
	Major	Corps of Engineers	15 May 1932	
	Lieutenant Colonel	Corps of Engineers	1 May 1940	
	Colonel	Army of the United States	11 December 1941	
	Brigadier General	Army of the United States	10 September 1942	
	Colonel	Corps of Engineers	28 December 1945	
	Brigadier General	Retired List	16 August 1948	

== Bibliography ==
- Ancell, R. Manning; Miller, Christine (1996). The Biographical Dictionary of World War II Generals and Flag Officers: The US Armed Forces. Westport, Connecticut: Greenwood Press. ISBN 0-313-29546-8. OCLC 33862161.
- Cullum, George W. (1920). Biographical Register of the Officers and Graduates of the US Military Academy at West Point New York Since Its Establishment in 1802: Supplement Volume VI 1910–1920. Chicago: R. R. Donnelly and Sons, The Lakeside Press.
- Cullum, George W. (1930). Biographical Register of the Officers and Graduates of the US Military Academy at West Point New York Since Its Establishment in 1802: Supplement Volume VII 1920–1930. Chicago: R. R. Donnelly and Sons, The Lakeside Press.
- Cullum, George W. (1940). Biographical Register of the Officers and Graduates of the US Military Academy at West Point New York Since Its Establishment in 1802: Supplement Volume VIII 1930–1940. Chicago: R. R. Donnelly and Sons, The Lakeside Press.
- Cullum, George W. (1950). Biographical Register of the Officers and Graduates of the US Military Academy at West Point New York Since Its Establishment in 1802: Supplement Volume IX 1940–1950. Chicago: R. R. Donnelly and Sons, The Lakeside Press.
