= List of massacres in Germany =

The following is an incomplete list of massacres that have occurred in present-day Germany and its predecessors:

== Massacres up until the year 1000 ==
The following is a list of massacres that have occurred in the territory of the present-day Germany before the year 1000:

| Name | Date | Location | Deaths | Description |
|---|---|---|---|---|
| Blood court at Cannstatt | 746 | Stuttgart-Bad Cannstatt, Suabia | several thousands | mass killing of Suabian leaders by Frankish ruler Carloman after failed uprising; many details unclear |
| Massacre of Verden | 782 | Verden, Lower Saxony | 4,500 | mass killing of Saxons by Frankish king Charlemagne during his campaign to conquer and Christianize their territory in today's Northern Germany |
| Lenzen massacre | 929 | Old Saxony | Unknown | Slavic captives, taken after the Battle of Lenzen, beheaded by king Henry the Fowler in Saxony |
| Recknitz massacre | 16 October 955 | Mecklenburg-Vorpommern | 700 | 700 Slavic prisoners beheaded by king Otto the Great. Slavic leader Stoigniew beheaded, and his counsellor's eyes and tongue gouged and torn out. |

== Massacres during the First Crusade of 1096 ==
In May and June 1096, during the Rhineland massacres, about 2,000–2,800 Jews were killed by mobs of German and sometimes French Christians of the People's Crusade or committed suicide to avoid baptism. Up to 95% of all killings happened between May 25 and June 1 in the three massacres of Worms, Speyer and Cologne. At least 1,600 killings are well testified, but some estimates run up to 5,000 or even 10,000 victims, thus annihilating about 1/4 to 1/3 of the Ashkenazi population of the time. In Jewish historiography, these events are referred to as Gezerot Tatnu which means "the edicts of [the year 4]856" of the Jewish calendar. The first persecutions of this group happened in late 1095 in France (Rouen riot of [December?] 1095, a smaller massacre there happening in September 1096 only, when the Rhineland massacres were over), than in Reims, Verdun and Metz (22 killed in June 1096), the latter two cities not yet belonging to France at that time. The key person of the Rhineland massacres was Count Emicho von Leiningen who led undisciplined troops of up to 10,000 crusaders.

| Name | Date | Location | Deaths | Description |
|---|---|---|---|---|
| Speyer killings (1096) | 3 May 1096 | Speyer | 11 | After the first killings had happened, the majority of the Jews were saved by the bishop of Speyer, who allowed them to enter his palace without demanding baptism. Later, he even had some prosecutors severely punished. 10 people killed plus one suicide, the names of the victims are known as are many details of the event. |
| Worms massacre (1096) | 18 May 1096 and 25 May 1096 | Worms | 500–800; about 400 known by name | On May 18, the crusaders killed some Jews they had found in their houses. Probably on May 25, they killed those who had found refuge in the bishop Adalbert's castle. Thus, the majority of the Jewish community of Worms were killed or committed suicide, only a few survived by accepting baptism. Like almost all of these forced converts, they secretly continued to practice Judaism and were allowed to return to their religion some months later. Many details about the event are recorded. |
| Mainz massacre (1096) | 27 May 1096 | Mainz | up to 600, other sources say 1,300 or about 1,100 | Many details recorded. The crusaders reached Mainz on 25 May and managed to enter the city the following day. The Jewish community of Mainz, informed about the Worms massacre, paid 300 pieces of silver to the bishop for his protection. He allowed them to enter his castle, but under the combined attack of crusaders and parts of the citizens of Mainz, he had to flee himself, and could not protect the Jews anymore. According to one source, under the leadership of Kalonymus ben Meshullam they offered desperate resistance against the crusaders. Finally, almost the whole community committed suicide or was killed. Several Jews who had accepted baptism to save their lives committed suicide soon later, one of them setting his house and the synagogue on fire. According to another source, Kalonymus and 53 of his comrades had been killed by the crusaders in Worms on May 27. |
| Cologne massacre (1096) | 1 June 1096 | Cologne | Estimates run from several dozen to about 300 up to 500–700 | This massacre is less well documented than the events in Speyer and Mainz. Synagogue destroyed, Jewish houses looted, many Jews killed. Archbishop Hermann III. (1089-1099) tried to protect the Jews by distributing them over seven villages or fortified towns around Cologne: Neuss, Xanten, Moers, Geldern, Wevelinghoven, Kerpen and Eller. But at several of these places the refugees were rounded up and killed end of June, with many of them committing suicide or killing each other to avoid baptism. The higher estimates of victims seem to include Jews from Cologne killed at other places. - 1096 pogroms are also attested in Magdeburg (expulsion), Regensburg (forced baptism in Danube river with return to Judaism after one year) and Prague (today Czech Republic; massacre of June 30). Unclear reports refer to Andernach and Koblenz. |
| Trier pogrom (1096) | June 1096 | Trier | 10 | Names of the victims are recorded, two of them were from Cologne. Most of the casualties (if not all) happened by suicide, some by parents killing their children and then themselves, some by women jumping into the river Moselle with stones in their clothes. The majority of the community survived by taking rescue in bishop Egildert's castle who forced them to accept baptism. Another source mentions the basilica of Trier as place of (first?) rescue (before the suicides?). The Jews of Trier had prevented a massacre in April by paying money and handing over provisions to a group of crusaders coming from France. The actual pogrom carried out in June by another group of crusaders coming from Mainz, a detachment of Count Emicho's troops. Precise date of the event unknown; with regard to the distances from Mainz, Metz and Neuss, a date around June 5 is plausible. |
| Neuss massacre (1096) | 24 June 1096 | Neuss | about 200(?) | Jews who had been evacuated from Cologne were killed in Neuss. According to one source, 200 Jews from Cologne had managed to escape with a ship on river Rhine to be caught and massacred by crusaders at Neuss. |
| Xanten massacre (1096) | 27 June 1096 | Xanten | about 60 | Jews who had escaped from Cologne were killed in Xanten. One source indicates that killings of Jews from Cologne happened in Wevelinghoven on June 25 and in Eller (now part of Düsseldorf) on June 26, 1096. The killings at Neuss, Xanten, Wevelinghoven and Eller have been carried out by the same troupe of Crusaders who had committed the pogroms of Trier and Metz several days before. |

== Massacres during the years 1097 to 1347 ==
| Name | Date | Location | Deaths | Description |
|---|---|---|---|---|
| Würzburg massacre (1147) | 1147 | Würzburg | unknown | Jews murdered, motivated by the Second Crusade 1147-49. |
| Neuss killing (1187) | 1187 | Neuss | 7 | A Jew who had killed a Christian girl was lynched by the mob, after that six innocent Jews. Houses of the killed were looted. The victims have been buried beside the graves of the victims of the 1096 massacre. |
| Frankfurt massacre (1241) | 24 May 1241 | Frankfurt | up to 180 | Violence started on Friday evening and lasted for two days with attacked Jews offering resistance. Three rabbis among the killed. Jewish community in Frankfurt destroyed until return of Jews around 1260, new community existed until destruction in the 1349 massacre. |
| Rintfleisch massacres | 20 April 1298 – 19 October 1298 | Southern Germany, Thuringia | Unknown. Estimates run from 4,000–5,000 to 20,000, one source estimates 100,000 (poorly recorded) | Mass killing of Jews in 146 villages and cities, killing around 20,000 or more people, of which 3,441 victims are documented name by name. The estimate of 100,000 killed is most probably an exaggeration. The killings peaked mid/end of July, only three massacres happened between August and October. The number of victims can only be speculated, however the poorly recorded Rintfleisch massacres allegedly reached the dimensions of the 1096 Rhineland massacres. |
| Armleder riots | 1336–1338 | Rhineland, Bavaria | unknown | Riots accompanied by a series of massacres against Jews in Western and Southern Germany, including Alsace (now French). |

== Black Death Jewish persecutions 1348 to 1351 ==
These series of massacres, which resulted in the partial or complete destruction of 210 Jewish communities in the Rhineland and 350 in all of Germany, started in Southern France (Toulon, April 1348) and Spain (Barcelona), than spread to Switzerland and South West Germany. 510 events documented all over Europe.

| Name | Date | Location | Deaths | Description |
|---|---|---|---|---|
| Stuttgart massacre (1348) | November 1348 | Stuttgart | unknown | The massacres of November 1348 in Stuttgart and nearby Esslingen may have been the first of the Black Death Jewish persecutions in Germany depending on the precise date which is not recorded (before or after the Augsburg event of Nov. 22?). |
| Augsburg massacre (1348) | 22 November 1348 | Augsburg | more than 100 | The partial destruction of the Jewish community of Augsburg was one of the first massacres of the Black Death Jewish persecutions in Germany, perhaps the first one. |
| Lindau massacre (1348) | 6 December 1348 | Lindau | 15–18 | Jews of Lindau burnt alive. Return of Jews to Lindau around 1378 only. |
| Speyer massacre (1349) | 22 January 1349 | Speyer | about 400 | Complete destruction of the city's Jewish community. |
| Freiburg massacre (1349) | 30 January 1349 | Freiburg | | The event is closely connected with the massacres in Basel (50-70 burnt on Jan. 16, 1349) and Straßburg (Feb. 14, up to 2,000 killed), which both happened outside of today's Germany. On Jan 1, some Jews of Freiburg were arrested and accused of poisoning wells. Under torture, four of them confessed and/or told the names of "further" well poisoners. The Freiburg community was killed by burning. Only the 12 richest Jews were spared, as were pregnant women and children, the latter being forcibly baptized. The epidemic reached the city in May 1349 only. |
| Landshut massacre (1349) | 17 February 1349 | Landshut | some hundreds (?) | Like in Erfurt, the Jews have been murdered before the epidemic had reached the city. The massacre has been fully backed by Stephen II, Duke of Bavaria. |
| Worms massacre (1349) | 1 March 1349 | Worms | 580 | To preempt their prosecutors, many Jews of Worms committed suicide by burning their own houses. |
| Erfurt massacre (1349) | 1349 | Erfurt | 100–3,000 | Precise date of the massacre March 21 (a Friday) is not fully confirmed, other sources say March 2 (a Sunday). The Black Death, the murdered Jews were charged with, reached Erfurt in 1350 only. |
| Würzburg massacre (1349) | 21 April 1349 | Würzburg | Several hundreds | Mass murder of Jews during the night of 20–21 April 1349 |
| Frankfurt massacre (1349) | 14 July 1349 | Frankfurt | Several hundreds (?) | About 60 slain, many more burnt in their houses. Many committed suicide by setting their own houses on fire, thus also taking revenge as the fire spread to non-Jewish neighbourhoods. |
| Mainz massacre (1349) | 24 August 1349 | Mainz | 1,000 to 3,000; according to one source 6,000 | The Mainz massacre was the largest among the Black Death Jewish persecutions. Furthermore, the Mainz massacre seems to be the only of these events which has not been organized (or even diligently planned in advance) but which started as a spontaneous riot (afternoon of August 23). Number of 6,000 victims is dubious, since the Mainz community at that time had about 3,000 members. |
| Nürnberg massacre (1349) | 5 December 1349 | Nürnberg | probably 562 | About one third of the Nürnberg Jewish community murdered. One of the later massacres of the Black Death Jewish persecutions. |
| Königsberg (Neumark) massacre (1351) | February 1351 | Königsberg (Neumark) | unknown | One of the latest massacres of the Black Death Jewish persecutions and one of very few of these events which happened in Brandenburg territory. Terminus ante quem is February 23, 1351. |

== Massacres of the 15th century ==
| Name | Date | Location | Deaths | Description |
|---|---|---|---|---|
| Kamenz massacre (1429) | 12 October 1429 | Kamenz, Saxony | 1,200 | Taborite (Hussite) troops from Bohemia reached Kamenz on October 6/7 and started to besiege the city and its castle. After five days, they first conquered the castle, then the adjacent city, and killed the citizens they found, about 1,200 Catholics. Many citizens of Kamenz survived the event as they had fled to Dresden before. |
| Lindau massacre (1430) | 3 July 1430 | Lindau | unknown | Jewish community of Lindau killed by burning after 1429 blood libel in the nearby city of Ravensburg. Similar events followed in Überlingen and Ravensburg itself. In Buchhorn (today: Friedrichshafen), Meersburg and Konstanz, the Jews were arrested without being massacred (in Lindau, Überlingen and Ravensburg they were arrested as well, months before being killed). In Konstanz, the Jewish community was arrested twice, at the end of 1429 and again in 1430; released at the end of 1430 after a high payment. |
| Überlingen massacre (1430) | August 1430 | Überlingen | 12 | Jewish community forced to convert, 11 did so, 12 refused and were killed by burning. Event belongs to the 1429/30 blood libel in nearby Ravensburg. |
| Ravensburg massacre (1430) | August 1430 | Ravensburg | unknown | Part of the Jewish community of the town killed; one source dates the event on July 3 (same day as Lindau massacre). The killings in Lindau, Überlingen and Ravensburg happened with approval of King Sigmund. |

== Massacres of the 16th to 18th century ==
| Name | Date | Location | Deaths | Description |
|---|---|---|---|---|
| Suppression of German Peasants' War | 1524–1525 | Southern Germany | 70,000–75,000 | A large number of the victims were killed during battles, thousands were massacred after the rebellion had been crushed. |
| Junkersdorf massacre | 3 July 1586 | Junkersdorf | 108 | Marauding soldiers in the service of Ernest of Bavaria ambush a convoy of 800 people and kill 108, injure 100 and loot their property. |
| Sack of Magdeburg | 20 May 1631 – 24 May 1631 | Magdeburg | about 25,000–30,000 | Largest massacre of Thirty Years' War in Germany. Mass killing of the inhabitants of Magdeburg (Protestant since 1524 and hence a center of Reformation) following its siege by Imperial Field Marshal Gottfried Heinrich Graf zu Pappenheim and Johann Tserclaes, Count of Tilly. On May 9, 1631, the city had about 35,000 inhabitants; only 5,000 to 10,000 of them survived. In a letter of June 24, Pope Urban VIII expressed his delight about the "annihilation of this nest of heretics". Up until 1639, the almost totally destroyed city was reduced to a small village of 450 people. |

== Massacres between 1900 and 1933 ==
| Name | Date | Location | Deaths | Description |
|---|---|---|---|---|
| Bremen school shooting | 20 June 1913 | Bremen | 5 | school shooting; 21 injured |
| Hinterkaifeck murders | 31 March 1922 | Waidhofen, Bavaria | 6 | Five members of the family of Andreas Gruber (including his two young grandchildren) were beaten to death along with their maid, Maria Baumgartner, who had just started working for the family. The bodies of the victims were discovered four days later. Although several suspects were arrested and interrogated, no person was ever charged with the crime |

== Killings and massacres in Nazi Germany, 1933–1945 ==
Most of the atrocities of this time happened outside of Germany, especially in Eastern Europe.

| Name | Date | Location | Deaths | Description |
|---|---|---|---|---|
| Köpenick's week of bloodshed | 21 June 1933 – 26 June 1933 | Köpenick | 21 | Sturmabteilung brigade kills 23 suspected opponents of Nazism |
| Night of the Long Knives | 30 June 1934 – 2 July 1934 | Germany | 85+ | Killing of political opponents of the German Nazi party and of rivals within the party. Whereas 85 kills are fully confirmed, some estimates run up to 700–1,000 persons murdered. |
| Kristallnacht | 9 November 1938 – 10 November 1938 | Germany | 91+ | Over 1,000 synagogues burned in all Germany and Austria, over 7,000 Jewish businesses destroyed or damaged. 91 Jewish people killed during the pogrom, more than 300 further died during the next days (including suicides). About 35% of these events happened in Austria or on territory which today belongs to Poland or to Russia. |
| Bürgerbräukeller Bombing | 8 November 1939 | Bürgerbräukeller, Munich | 8 | German carpenter Georg Elser placed a time-bomb at the Bürgerbräukeller in Munich, where Hitler was due to give his annual speech in commemoration of the Beer Hall Putsch. Hitler left earlier than expected and the bomb detonated, killing eight and injuring sixty-two others. |
| Aktion T4 at Grafeneck | 18 January 1940 – 13 December 1940 | Grafeneck Euthanasia Centre | 10,654 | |
| Aktion T4 at Brandenburg an der Havel | February 1940 – 1 November 1940 | Brandenburg Euthanasia Centre | 9,972 | |
| Aktion T4 at Hartheim | May 1940 – 1 September 1941 | Hartheim Euthanasia Centre | 18,269 | |
| Aktion T4 at Sonnenstein | 28 June 1940 – 1 September 1941 | Sonnenstein Euthanasia Centre | 13,720 | |
| Aktion T4 at Bernburg | 21 November 1940 – 1 September 1941 | Bernburg Euthanasia Centre | 9,384 | |
| Aktion T4 at Hadamar | 13 January 1941 – 1 September 1941 | Hadamar Euthanasia Centre | 10,072 | 10,072 mentally ill and disabled people killed and burnt. Between 1942 and 1945 another 4,422 people with this kind of diagnosis were killed near Hadamar. In total, more than 275,000 people were killed during Aktion T4, many of them in German-controlled Austria, Czechoslovakia and Poland. |
| Borkum Island Massacre | 4 August 1944 | Borkum Island | 7 | Massacre of 7 U.S. POWs |
| Rüsselsheim massacre | 26 August 1944 | Rüsselsheim | 6 | The townspeople of Rüsselsheim killed six American POWs who were walking through the bombed-out town while escorted by two German guards |
| Arnsberg Forest massacre | 20 March 1945 – 23 March 1945 | Arnsberg Forest | 208 | Mass killing of Polish and Soviet POWs. |
| Celle massacre | 8 April 1945 – 10 April 1945 | Celle | at least 170 | Killing of KZ inmates by SS guards and other Nazi forces (police, Volkssturm). The traditional number of victim was 200 to 300, according to more recent research at least 170 victims are well testified. The killings started on April 8, after a train crowded with 3,800 to 4,500 KZ inmates was hit by the allied air raid against Celle during the night of April 7–8. This event killed 400 to 1000 of the KZ inmates (higher numbers being stated as well), most survivors tried to escape. Celle was captured by Allied forces on April 12, 1945. |
| Lüneburg massacre | 11 April 1945 | Lüneburg | 60–80 | Slave laborers from the Wilhelmshaven subcamp of Neuengamme massacred by German troops and an SS officer. |
| Gardelegen massacre | 13 April 1945 | Gardelegen | 1,016 | 1,016 slave laborers, mostly Poles, but also of various other nationalities, including French, Russian and Belgian, burned alive by Volkssturm, Hitlerjugend and firefighters |
| Abtnaundorf massacre | 18 April 1945 | Abtnaundorf | at least 84 | An unknown number of prisoners of the Leipzig-Thekla subcamp of Buchenwald massacred by the Gestapo, SS, Volkssturm and German civilians. |
| Lippach massacre | 22 April 1945 | near Westhausen | 24 | 24 Waffen-SS prisoners of war killed by the US 12th Armored Division. 20 women raped. |
| Treuenbrietzen massacres | 23 April 1945 | Treuenbrietzen | estimated 300 | Wehrmacht kills 127 Italian internees in a local concentration camp. The same day Soviet Army enters and kills between 30 and 168 male inhabitants of Treuenbrietzen. |
| Horka massacre | 26 April 1945 | Horka | Around 300 | Polish POWs, mostly wounded soldiers and medical personnel of a field hospital column of the 9th Polish Armored Division massacred by German forces. |
| Zapel-Ausbau massacre | 3 May 1945 | near Zapel | 25 | 25 concentration camp inmates shot by the SS |
| SS Cap Arcona | 3 May 1945 | near Lübeck | 7,000 – 7,500 | Prisoners from Nazi concentration camps killed when the SS Cap Arcona was sunk in the last days of the Second World War by the Royal Air Force, incl. killing of survivors by SS. |

== Killings in Germany after 1945 ==
| Name | Date | Location | Deaths | Description |
|---|---|---|---|---|
| Executions after the Waldheim Trials | 4 November 1950 | Waldheim, Saxony | 23 | After Stalinist style trials in then German Democratic Republic against 3,442 persons between April and June 1950, 32 death sentences were announced in July. 23 of them were executed. |
| Uprising of 1953 in East Germany | 17 June 1953 | Berlin, Leipzig, Dresden, Magdeburg, Rostock and several other cities in East Germany | about 75 | 34 protesters shot on June 17 and during the following days by Soviet troops and GDR police and other GDR security forces. Another 19 executed by Soviet drumhead courts-martial up until June 22; 7 more executed after regular trials by East German courts, further victims perished or committed suicide in GDR jails. |
| Cologne school massacre | 11 June 1964 | Cologne | 10 | school massacre; 22 injured |
| Munich massacre | 5 September 1972 – 6 September 1972 | Munich, West Germany | 17 | Palestinian terrorists killed Israeli athletes. |
| Oktoberfest bombing | 26 September 1980 | Munich, West Germany | 13 | 13 people were killed and 213 injured by the explosion of a bomb planted by a right-wing terrorist at an Oktoberfest festival in Munich, The dead included the person who had planted the bomb, 21-year-old University of Tübingen student Gundolf Köhler, a member of the neo-Nazi Wehrsportgruppe Hoffmann |
| 1982 Nuremberg shooting | 24 June 1982 | Nuremberg, Bavaria West Germany | 4 | A neo-Nazi Helmut Oxner opened fire at a discotheque and on the street, killing three people and wounding three others before committing suicide |
| Eppstein school shooting | 3 June 1983 | Eppstein-Vockenhausen, West Germany | 6 | 14 injured |
| Mykonos restaurant assassinations | 17 September 1992 | Berlin | 4 | |
| 1992 Mölln arson attack | 22 November 1992 | Mölln, Schleswig-Holstein | 3 | A molotov cocktail is thrown into the house of a Turkish migrant family, destroying the property and killing three occupants. Two known neo-Nazis were convicted of murder a year later |
| 1993 Solingen arson attack | 28 May 1993 | Solingen | 5 | 14 injured |
| National Socialist Underground murders | 9 September 2000 – 25 April 2007 | Various cities | 10 | 25 injured |
| Erfurt massacre | 26 April 2002 | Erfurt | 17 | school shooting; 7 injured |
| Duisburg massacre | 15 August 2007 | Duisburg, North Rhine-Westphalia | 6 | ongoing feud between Italian mobsters. |
| Winnenden school shooting | 11 March 2009 | Winnenden | 16 | 9 injured |
| 2016 Munich shooting | 22 July 2016 | Munich | 10 | 35 injured |
| 2016 Berlin truck attack | 19 December 2016 | Berlin | 13 | Truck-ramming attack by Islamic State supporter in a Christmas market; 55 injured |
| Halle synagogue shooting | 9 October 2019 | Halle | 2 | Terrorist shooting spree. Attempted attack on a nearby synagogue by neo-Nazi; after failing to force entry killed two random Germans and wounded two others with homemade firearm on the street and in a Turkish restaurant; 2 killed, 5 injured |
| Hanau shootings | 19 February 2020 | Hanau | 10 | Terrorist shooting spree committed by far-right extremist in two shisha bars and a cafe; 9 killed, 5 injured |

== See also ==
- The Holocaust, List of Nazi concentration camps, Category:World War II prisoner-of-war camps in Germany
- German war crimes, War crimes of the Wehrmacht, Nazi crimes against Soviet POWs, Category:Nazi war crimes
- Extermination through labor, Forced labour under German rule during World War II
