= Rabbit hunting (disambiguation) =

Rabbit hunting or rabbit hunt is hunting for rabbits. The expressions may also refer to one of the following:

- Rabbit hunting (poker), a poker term
- Hiawatha's Rabbit Hunt, a Warner Bros. cartoon in the Merrie Melodies series
- Rabbit-hunt game, a scenario in the game BZFlag
- Celle rabbit hunt, a massacre of concentration camp internees in northern German town of Celle, Prussian Hanover
- Rabbit Hunt, a comic collection from the Kane series by Paul Grist
