= Edward F. Lyons Jr. =

American lawyer

- Born: 17 September 1899; Boston, Massachusetts, U.S
- Died: 28 December 1990 (aged 91) Boston, Massachusetts, U.S.
- Allegiance: United States of America
- Branch: United States Army
- Rank: Captain
- Education: Northeastern University School of Law
- Spouse: Mary E. Lyons (née Moloney)
- Other work: Chief, Pentagon War Crimes Branch; Member, Security Screening Board; Member, Clemency and Parole Board for War Criminals

Edward Francis Lyons Jr. was a World War II veteran who supported the prosecution of German war criminals. He served as an intelligence officer at a prisoner-of-war camp for Germans in Oklahoma before joining the prosecution staff at the Borkum Island trial, a case involving the assault and execution of seven United States airmen.

== Early life ==
Lyons was born in Boston, Massachusetts on September 17, 1899. After graduating from Northeastern University Law School in 1921, he practiced law until 1933 at which time he was offered a position with the Home Owners' Loan Corporation of the US federal government. Lyons soon became the corporation’s assistant regional counsel for New York, New England and New Jersey, after which he began his army career.

== Army career ==
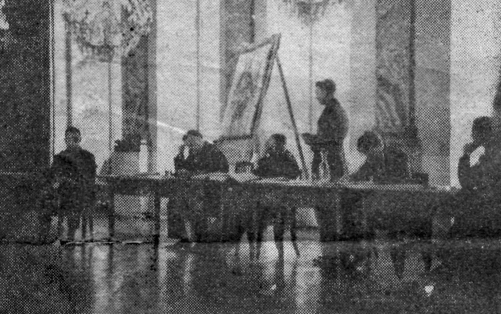
Capt. Edward F. Lyons Jr., of the prosecution, reads testimony taken during the Borkum Island trial.

Lyons was drafted into the Army on June 2, 1943. He began his career as an intelligence officer at a German prisoner-of-war camp in El Reno, Oklahoma, where he remained until 1945. Lyons spent the next year as part of the first group of Army lawyers tending to war crime investigations and trials in Europe. He was honorably discharged from active duty in 1946, and from the Reserve on April 1, 1953.

=== Borkum Island trial ===
At the end of World War II, Allied forces including the United States, Great Britain, Russia and France, agreed to prosecute German war criminals on the basis of military law. Negotiations included the reconciliation of European concepts of justice with those of the United States, which sought to criminalize aggressive warfare as opposed to specific war crimes.

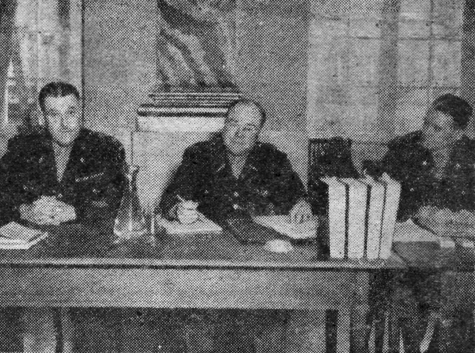
Members of the prosecution staff at the Borkum Island trial are, left to right, Maj. Joseph D. Bryan, Capt. John A. May, and Capt. Edward F. Lyons Jr.

Associate Justice Robert H. Jackson, chief war crimes prosecutor for the United States Supreme Court at the time of the Borkum Island trial, told the New York Herald Tribune, "It seemed a very great mistake to let this war end on a note of simple vengeance. It would be a shame to close the war without making the story known to the people." Jackson also hoped that the war crime trials would provide further evidence to the public for recognizing the "incipient stage" of Fascism, alive and well at the time of publication.

As part of this agreement, Lyons and two other Army lawyers were chosen to serve on the prosecution staff of the 1945 Borkum Island trial in Ludwisburg, Germany. In the trial, 15 German defendants were accused of forcing 7 U.S. airmen to make an eight-mile "death march" across the island of Borkum, which ultimately resulted in their executions. The prosecution staff tackled the challenge of proving that the march through the island was planned in a way that would result in "maximum exposure to violence". Lyons and his colleagues proved their case in part through eye witness testimony asserting that officers of the guard leading the march punished those guards who were considered to be too lenient on the U.S. airmen.

Upon completion of the trial, Lyons returned to the United States and was discharged from active duty.

== Civilian life ==
Upon discharge, Lyons served as a U.S. Army civilian employee in the Pentagon's War Crimes Branch. Here he continued to support the prosecution of German war criminals for the remainder of his career. He joined the Security Screening Board in 1955 and the Clemency and Parole Board for War Criminals in 1957. Lyons was discharged from the Army Reserve in 1953, and retired from the War Crimes Branch as chief in 1959.

== Death ==
Lyons died at Boston's Brigham and Women's Hospital on December 28, 1990 at the age of 91, leaving behind his wife Mary E. Lyons (née Moloney).

== See also ==
- Borkum Island trial
- War Crimes
- War crimes of the Wehrmacht
- Nuremberg Trials
- Dachau Trials
- Nazi Germany
- Allied forces (World War II)
