= Samuel Hogan =

United States Army officer (1915–2005)

Samuel Mason Hogan
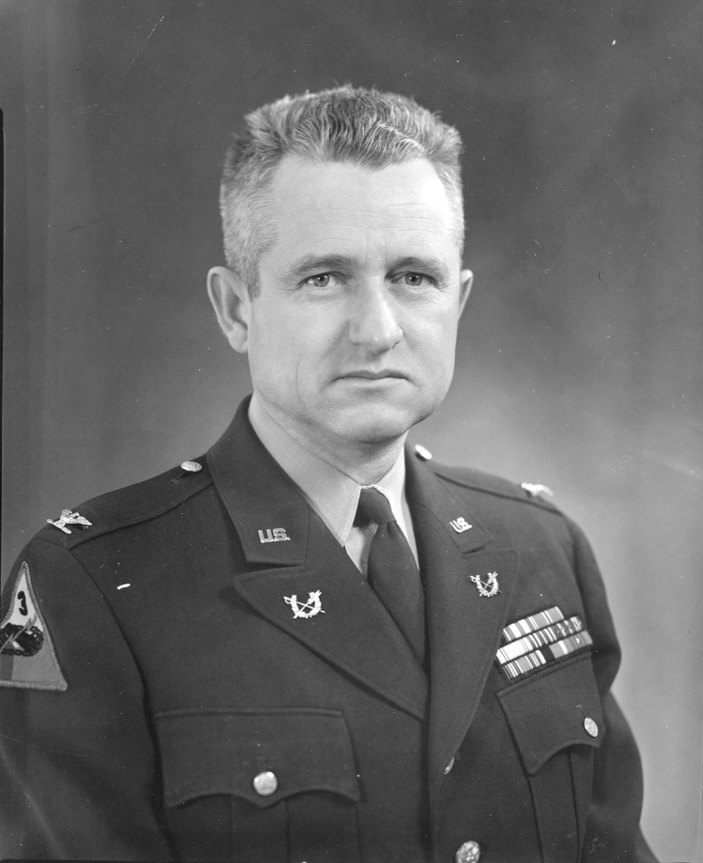
- Born: November 9, 1915; Corsicana, Texas, United States
- Died: May 3, 2005 (aged 89)
- Military career
- Allegiance: United States
- Branch: United States Army
- Service years: 1938–1968
- Rank: Colonel
- Service number: 0-21094
- Commands: 3rd Battalion, 33rd Armored Regiment; 1st Battalion, 26th Infantry Regiment (attached), 2nd Battalion, 119th Infantry (attached), 2nd Battalion, 47th Infantry (attached), 1st Battalion, 330th Infantry (attached)
- Conflicts: World War II; Cold War
- Awards: Silver Star; Legion of Merit; Bronze Star

Samuel Mason Hogan (November 9, 1915 – May 3, 2005) was a career United States Army officer, serving from 1938 to 1968. In World War II Hogan would serve as commander of the 3rd Armored Division's 3rd Battalion, 33rd Armored Regiment also known as Task Force Hogan. At 28 years old, he was purportedly the youngest American tank battalion commander during WWII and would rise to colonel during his service.

== Early life ==
Samuel Mason Hogan was born to parents Dodge Causey and Mary Adeline Hogan in Corsicana, Texas, on November 9, 1915. Descended from Scots Irish pioneers, soldiers and frontier lawmen, he grew up riding horses, hunting, and fishing in the Rio Grand Valley. Hogan attended the Pharr-San Juan-Alamo High. He graduated as valedictorian and then attended one year at Pan-American University, now University of Texas Rio Grande Valley. His mother encouraged Sam to seek a West Point appointment which was achieved in 1934, appointed by Congressman Milton West. He graduated from the United States Military Academy in the upper 15% in the class of 1938. He was the first in his class to pick the Cavalry Branch. He spent the next three years at Fort Brown, leading A Troop, 12th Cavalry Regiment patrolling the US-Mexico Border on horseback.

In early 1941 he was assigned to Troop F, 13th Armored Regiment, 1st Armored Division, at the embryonic Armored Center, Ft. Knox, KY. There, he commanded a basic training company. In April 1941 he moved to Camp Beauregard, LA, as assistant S-3 of the 33rd Armored Regiment in the newly formed 3rd Armored Division. In December 1941 he was promoted to captain and commanded the Regimental Recon Company. Promoted to major in 1942, he became 3rd Battalion commander before moving to the Desert Training Center, what is now Fort Irwin, CA. Promoted to lieutenant colonel, he trained at Indiantown Gap, PA, before shipping off with his unit to the Midlands, England.

Hogan was purportedly the youngest tank battalion commander during WWII at age 28, responsible for the welfare, lives and mission accomplishment of 500 soldiers operating 54 Sherman tanks and assorted other vehicles.

== World War II ==
Sam took his medium tank battalion aboard Landing Ships Tank (LST) and with the rest of the 3rd Armored Division crossed the English Channel on 23 Jun 1944 landing at Omaha Beach.

The battalion's first major action was the capture of Hill 91 also known as Hauts Vents. The hill overlooked the bridge crossing the river Vire at Pont Hebert-a critical jumping off point for the upcoming breakout operation known as Cobra. The hedgerow fighting resulted in many casualties, several of whom were incinerated in their Sherman tanks and remain, to this day, Missing in Action. After capturing the hill at great cost, the unit occupied it for four days fighting off repeated counterattacks including strafing runs by Luftwaffe fighter-bombers.

After relief by the 30th Infantry Division, the unit began buildup and planning for the great breakout from the Normandy perimeter: Operation Cobra. Before the operation was launched however, Adolf Hitler ordered a four-division counterattack, Operation Luttich, designed to cut through the allied line and capture Avranches on the English Channel. In one move, the German offensive would cut the newly operational Third Army, General George Patton, Commanding, from the allied resupply ports at Omaha Beach. Cut off from supply, Patton's Third Army, without its daily 25,000 gallons of fuel needed to move, would languish and die at the hands of mobile Kampfgruppe, the enemy equivalent of an armored task force.

Hogan's Task Force, deployed on a ridge near the hamlet of Chérencé-le-Roussel, fought off a probe by enemy Mark IV tanks destroying six of them. The enemy tanks were the first wave of Operation Luttich in that sector. For this action, Sam Hogan received the Silver Star for gallantry in action.

In the city of Mortain, the main German spearheads began encircling the US infantry unit within, the 120th Regiment from the 30th Infantry Division. For the following five days, Task Force Hogan fought to relieve the US 120th Infantry Regiment encircled in the hilltop redoubt of Mortain as they held off the German advance to Avranches. In the face of heavy German attacks by SS regiments, artillery of all types and several Luftwaffe sorties, they held their ground and kept pressure off the surrounded GIs of the 30th Infantry Division until 12 August, when Hitler gave his exhausted troops permission to discontinue the attack.

In March 2020, the Presidential Unit Citation was awarded to Task Force Hogan, 33rd Armored Regiment “For extraordinary heroism in action and outstanding performance of duty against armed enemy forces from 6 August 1994 to 12 August 1944 in the vicinity of Mortain, France.”

After helping defeat Operation Luttich, Task Force Hogan helped close the Falaise Pocket as the First Army unit on the flank of the 2nd French Armored Division. Throughout the dash through France Sam Hogan's Sherman or Jeep always flew a Texas Flag from the radio antenna, to show his soldiers he was always out front with them. The Stars and Stripes reported on this morale quirk and local Frenchmen welcoming their liberators reacted with wide-eyed looks and smiles to Sam's remark that it was “the flag of the free Americans”.

From Falaise, they went on to liberate Mons and help net another pocket of 8000 German troops thereby destroying much of the equipment and combat power that could’ve stopped the allies at the German border fortifications of the Siegfried Line-just ahead on the far end of the small Belgian nation. After liberating Liege, they crossed into Germany proper where heavy battles secured the industrial towns around Stolberg, helping isolate Aachen, the first major German city in the allies’ path. Task Force Hogan was attached to 1st Infantry Division where tank-infantry tactics in urban terrain were perfected between Hogan's tanks and GIs of the 26th Infantry Regiment “Blue Spaders”. Their efforts paid off with the capture of the first major German city to fall to the allies in WWII-the old imperial capital of Aachen.

After Aachen, First Army needed to await the massive buildup of supplies and reinforcements necessary to take the bridges on the Rhine and then fight to the next objective- the industrial Ruhr region. But Adolf Hitler had another card up his sleeve.

The second time the unit would find itself in the way of a German offensive was at the Battle of the Bulge. On 19 December 1944, the only First Army units available to react to the German offensive through the Ardennes were the 82nd Airborne Division and one Combat Command of the 3rd Armored Division. Task Force Hogan was ordered to leave their advanced positions in Germany and double back to Belgium with the objective Houffalize. The Task Force was down to 1/3 of their available tanks and received zero intelligence about enemy strength or intentions.

After an all-night march towards the objective, with V-1 flying bombs pulsing overhead on the way to destroy allied supply dumps in Antwerp, they arrived at La Roche with fuel tanks half full and no planned resupply. A morning leaders recon left the command group cut off after running into a column of Germans dressed as Americans. Samuel Hogan, his Operations Officer, Major Travis Brown and the Recon Platoon Leader, Lieutenant Clark Worrell escaped into the woods as the enemy looted their disabled jeeps. They rejoined the Task Force after spending 12 hours evading German patrols in the Ardennes forests. For the next six days Task Force Hogan fought skilled delaying actions from hilltop town to hilltop town until surrounded and cut off by the 116th Panzer (Greyhound) and 246th Infantry Divisions.

The beleaguered battalion hindered the German advance by calling in artillery on the columns streaming around their hilltop redoubt at the town of Marcouray. But they were short of ammunition, fuel and medical supplies so MG Maurice Rose ordered the task force to destroy their vehicles and make out on foot as best they could. All available units were dedicated to relieving the 101st Airborne Division, 20 miles away at Bastogne-so they were on their own.

On Christmas Night “Hogan's 400” marched 12 miles through enemy held woods back to US lines. It was a Christmas miracle that made the news back home including in Cinema reels, local newspaper stories and the Stars and Stripes-the periodical for deployed soldiers.

* [Hogan's 400 — Memorial website dedicated to Task Force Hogan

and the encirclement of Marcouray, December 1944]

(https://www.hogans400.com)

The Battle of the Bulge ended any further thoughts of a US advance towards the Rhine in 1944.

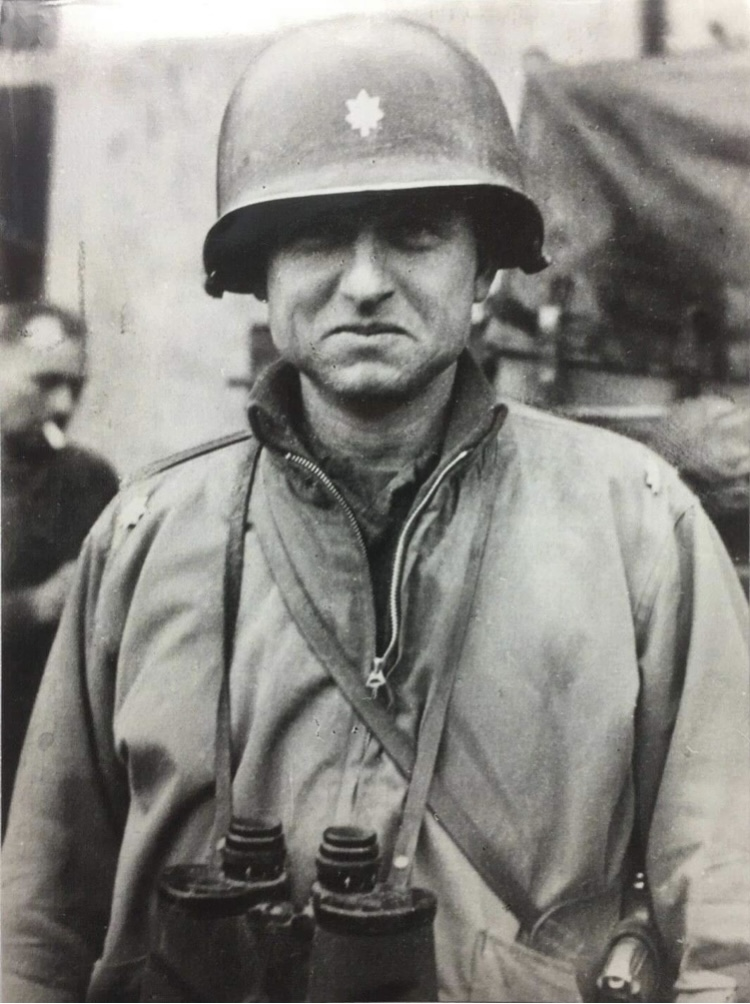

After their daring escape on Christmas Day, the Task Force rested for five days until they could receive new tanks, wheeled vehicles and small arms. On 3 January 1945 they participated in the counteroffensive to eliminate the bulge and push the Germans back to their starting point of 16 December 1944. After heavy fighting the final German units were driven back to their starting positions on 25 January 1945. The Bulge was the largest battle ever fought by the US Army. Spearhead sustained battle losses of 125 medium tanks, 38 light tanks, and 1,473 casualties, including 187 killed in action.

It was almost the end of January 1945, but Spearhead still had many more days of combat in front of them. After more refitting, including being among the first to employ the new M26 Pershing, Task Force Hogan pushed on deeper into Germany.

The battalion helped capture Cologne in early March. Many are familiar with Task Force Richardson’s sector which included the cathedral and was made famous in the Combat Camera footage of the Panther versus Pershing duel. Task Force Hogan's sector of Cologne was north of Richardson's, encompassing the Ford factory district and the famous Cologne Zoo. The capture of Cologne was a success but did not yield its biggest prize, an untouched bridge across the Rhine river-the finally natural obstacle before Berlin.

Hogan and Richardson, both Texans, were buddies that had a friendly rivalry since the days of training in the United States. MG Rose encouraged this friendly competition by offering a case of Scotch to the first commander to get troops across the Erft, a Rhine tributary that needed to be captured before crossing the Rhine itself. After heavy combat, Sam had gotten infantry across first on a footbridge, but Rich Richardson got tanks across the following day. Spearhead being an armored division-Sam decided to split the case with his friend. Their respective staffs got to enjoy a well-deserved nip as they headed to cross the Rhine near Bad Honnef on 21 March 1945.

Once across the Rhine, Spearhead made history once again with the longest single-day advance against an armed enemy in military history. To capture the German Army's Tank Training Center at Paderborn, Spearhead marched 90 miles in a single day. Task Force Hogan provided the flank screen for this operation and Sam was awarded the Bronze Star for his leadership in that historic achievement.

At the ensuing battle at Paderborn Spearhead took heavy casualties in battles against German tank experts riding in heavily armed and armored tanks: the Tiger I and Tiger II. Spearhead's division commander, Major General Maurice Rose, was killed in action on 30 March 1945 during the battle.

The mission had to continue though, and BG Doyle Hickey assumed command as Spearhead closed the Ruhr pocket linking up with 2nd Armored Division north of Paderborn, effectively destroying the German Army Group B as a fighting force. This was yet another history making first for Task Force Hogan and the 3rd Armored Division: they were one of a few units to participate in the closure of all three major German pockets in the European Theater: Falaise, Mons and Ruhr resulting in the capture of almost 400,000 enemy prisoners of war.

From there, Spearhead liberated the concentration camp at Nordhausen, which provided slave labor for the V-2 ballistic missile factory nearby at Dora-Mittelbau.

On 23 April 1945, with the capture of Dessau, the combat ended after 220 days. Spearhead and Task Force Hogan reached the Elbe River, less than 100 miles from Hitler's bunker in Berlin.

== Post War ==
After the war, Hogan served as a military attorney coordinating a team of German and American lawyers during the Borkum Island War Crimes Tribunal held at Ludwigsberg Palace in Germany. He then returned to the United States to attend Law School at Columbia University followed by the Command and General Staff College, Fort Leavenworth Kansas.

He then served as staff judge advocate, 2d Armored Division; chief of staff, 4th Armored Division; chief of staff, 7th Logistics Command, Korea; and advisor to the 40th Armored Division, Los Angeles, CA. He attended the US Army War College in Carlisle Barracks, PA. Then reported to the Pentagon, where Colonel Sam Hogan became Deputy Assistant Secretary of Defense for Education. He finished his 30-year career as the Defense Attaché at US Embassy Quito, Ecuador.

In retirement, Hogan stayed active running a wildlife safari company in the Amazon basin and Andean highlands. He was also a tireless advocate for animal welfare, equal rights and the environment. In 2002, he was made honorary colonel of the 26th Infantry Regiment, a rare honor for a non-infantry officer. Hogan died from complications resulting from a fall in May 2005 at the age of 89.

== Family ==
Hogan lost his wife Gina to cancer in 1963. He remarried and in total raised 4 children. His eldest son Patrick served honorably in the Vietnam War as a Military Intelligence combat cameraman and image interpretation specialist. His youngest children, William and Mary, served as officers in the active duty army with multiple deployments and overseas tours.

== Awards and decorations ==

Colonel Hogan's individual awards and decorations include the Silver Star, Bronze Star, Legion of Merit medals, the Joint Service Commendation Medal, and the Army Commendation Medal. The American Defense Service Medal, American Campaign Medal, European-African-Middle Eastern Campaign Medal with five campaign stars, the World War II Victory Medal, Army of Occupation Medal with "Germany" clasp, the World War II French Croix De Guerre Medal with Silver Star (for mention in dispatches at the Division level), the Belgian fourragere and the Republic of Ecuador Order of Abdon Calderon.

Badges	Army Staff Identification Badge	Office of the Secretary of Defense Identification Badge
