= Lippach massacre =

1945 US war crime in Germany

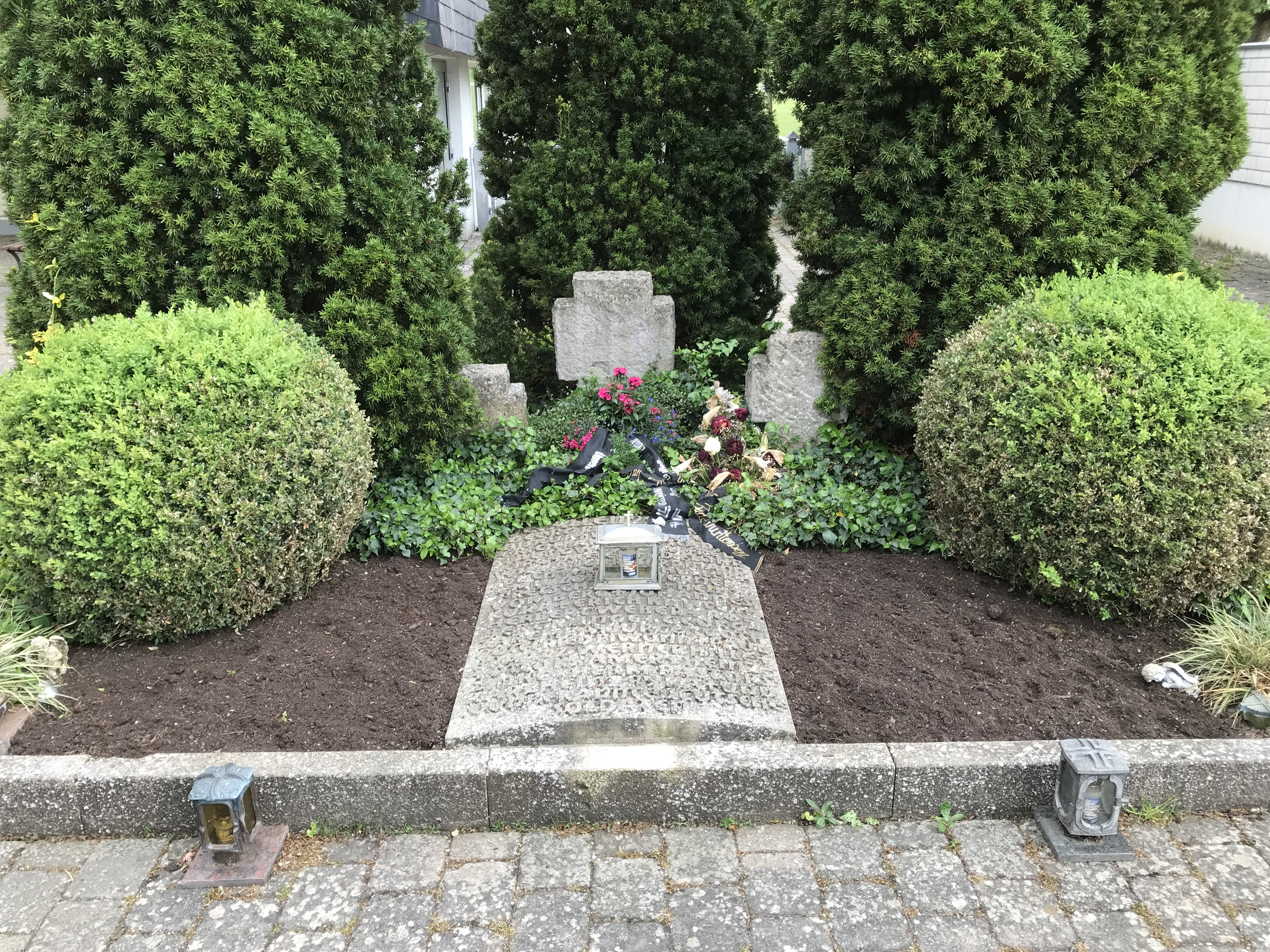
- Joint grave of the 36 Waffen-SS soldiers in Lippach cemetery

- Location of Lippach in the German state of Baden-Württemberg
- Interactive map of Lippach
- Location: 48.897°N 10.253°E; Near Westhausen, Gau Württemberg-Hohenzollern
- Date: 22 April 1945; 81 years ago
- Attack type: War crime; Mass murder; War rape
- Victims: ~24 POWs murdered; ~20 women and girls raped
- Perpetrators: 23rd Tank Battalion, 12th Armored Division (US Army)

The Lippach massacre is a war crime committed by the 12th Armored Division of the US Army on 22 April 1945 during the Western Allied invasion of Germany. Some 25 US soldiers from the 3rd Provisional Company killed 36 Waffen-SS soldiers and reportedly raped 20 women and girls in the village of Lippach, near Westhausen. Around two-thirds of the soldiers had already surrendered, and were thus legally considered prisoners of war (POWs) according to the 1929 Geneva Convention on Prisoners of War.

== Battle ==
At noon on 22 April, the 12th Armored Division's 23rd Tank Battalion attacked 300 Waffen-SS troops at the village of Lippach. German artillery, Nebelwerfer, Panzerfaust and small arms fire held the Americans back until 4 pm.

== Massacre and mass rape ==
As the rest of the 23rd Tank Battalion advanced toward Lauchheim, the 3rd Provisional Company came across an alcohol warehouse. Some 25 drunken US soldiers then shot at least 10 unarmed German POWs at a meadow on the outskirts of the village, while six more were herded through the streets and into the cemetery, where they were beaten and had their skulls bashed in.

Elsewhere, a captured German officer was beaten by US soldiers, who then bashed his head with a rifle and drove a bayonet through his chest. Two German POWs were taken to a farm, where US soldiers attempted to kill them using a circular saw, although they were unable to due to a power failure. Both POWs were subsequently shot by the soldiers, although one survived severely injured and was later treated by locals. On a country road east of the village, two more German POWs were reportedly run over by tanks.

Residents later found the remains of the soldiers, some of which had gunshot wounds to the back and the head, while four bodies appeared to have been burnt. In total, thirty-six Waffen-SS soldiers lost their lives near Lippach, about two-thirds of them after the battle. The US soldiers also reportedly raped about 20 women and girls, some of whom were pregnant, ranging in age from 17 to 40. Ten of the soldiers killed were known to be 16 years old, while the oldest known soldier was born in 1909.

== See also ==
- List of massacres in Germany
- Rape during the occupation of Germany
- United States war crimes

== Sources ==
- Bradstreet, Kenneth G. (1991). "Back Tracks". Hellcat News. 44 (8, April). Seward, Nebraska: 12th Armoured Division Association – via University of North Texas Libraries.
- Fritz, Stephen (2004). Endkampf: Soldiers, Civilians, and the Death of the Third Reich. Lexington, Kentucky: University Press of Kentucky. ISBN 0-8131-2325-9. LCCN 2004010763. OCLC 1348232521. OL 8022531M. Translated extract available at "Auszug von S. 180, 182 und 307 zum Massaker von Lippach mit deutscher Übersetzung" [Excerpt from Pages 180, 182, and 307 Regarding the Lippach Massacre, with German Translation] (PDF) (in German and English).
- Staatsarchiv Ludwigsburg EL 20/1 VI Bü 641. Gräberliste für öffentlich gepflegte Gräber (in German). Lippach: Gemeinde Lippach. 29 November 1985 [23 December 1968] – via Landesarchiv Baden-Württemberg.
- Jauß, Uwe (20 April 2025). "Oft verschwiegen: Als die Amerikaner deutsche Kriegsgefangene niedermetzeln" [Often Hushed Up: When Americans Slaughtered German Prisoners of War]. Schwäbische Zeitung (in German). Schwäbischer Verlag. "transl. Eyewitnesses recount that [...] around 4 pm, [...] American soldiers herded six prisoners of war along the village street, shouting and jeering. [...] Near the cemetery, the Americans bashed in their prisoners' skulls. [...] Elsewhere in Lippach, an SS non-commissioned officer was beaten half to death after his capture. His tormentors then bashed in his skull with a rifle butt and finally drove a bayonet through his chest. According to local accounts, Americans at the farm of a man named Ladenburger attempted to saw two prisoners in half alive using a circular saw. [...] On the outskirts of the village, residents found disarmed German soldiers who had been executed by gunshot to the head. Other apparently unarmed prisoners had been shot in the back. On a country road east of Lippach, US tanks apparently ran over two Germans. Four victims were found burned. [...] According to accounts, there were approximately 20 rapes. The victims ranged in age from 17 to 40; some were pregnant."
- Kießling, Winfried (2003). 850 Jahre Lippach (in German). Lippach: Förderverein 850 Jahre Lippach.
- Königer, Gerhard (17 May 2021). "Die Meldung und ihre Geschichte" [The Report and Its Story]. Schwäbische Post (in German). Archived from the original on 6 December 2025. "Einige der SS-Soldaten wurden zum Friedhof getrieben und erschlagen, andere wurden erschossen. Die US-Soldaten seien betrunken gewesen wird berichtet. Sie hätten versucht, zwei der Besiegten lebendig mit einer Kreissäge zu töten, was aber nicht gelang, weil der Strom ausgefallen war. (transl. Some of the SS soldiers were driven to the cemetery and beaten to death, while others were shot. It is reported that the US soldiers were drunk. They allegedly attempted to kill two of the defeated men alive using a circular saw, but which was unsuccessful because there was a power failure.)"
- Antrag der Fraktion Die Republikaner und Stellungnahme des Innenministeriums: US-Kriegsverbrechen in Südwestdeutschland [Motion of the Parliamentary Group The Republicans and Statement of the Ministry of the Interior: US War Crimes in Southwest Germany] (PDF) (Report) (in German). Landtag von Baden-Württemberg. 25 March 1997. Drucksache 12/991.
- Mayer, Franz (8 September 2025). "Kriegsverbrechen 1945: Erschütternde Berichte über grausame Taten" [War Crimes in 1945: Harrowing Reports of Gruesome Acts]. Schwäbische Zeitung (in German). Schwäbischer Verlag.
- Zigan, Harald (16 April 2015). "Kriegsende 1945 (Teil 10): US-Soldaten nehmen blutige Rache in Jungholzhausen und Ilshofen" [End of the War 1945 (Part 10): US Soldiers Exact Bloody Revenge in Jungholzhausen and Ilshofen]. Südwest Presse (in German). Archived from the original on 6 March 2019. "In dem Dorf kam es auch zu mehreren Vergewaltigungen. (transl. Several rapes also occurred in the village.)"
