= Zapel-Ausbau massacre =

1945 massacre in Germany

- Location: 53.554°N 11.668°E; Zapel-Ausbau, near Crivitz, Gau Mecklenburg
- Date: 3 May 1945
- Attack type: Mass murder
- Deaths: 25
- Perpetrator: SS

The Zapel-Ausbau massacre was a massacre committed by the SS of Nazi Germany on 3 May 1945 during the final days of World War II in Europe. Twenty-five concentration camp evacuees on a death march were shot by several SS personnel in a barn near the village of Zapel-Ausbau in Mecklenburg.

== Massacre ==
As the Red Army neared, the Sachsenhausen and Ravensbrück concentration camps were evacuated by the SS in late April 1945 and the inmates forced onto death marches. 30 sick and weakened inmates were left in a barn near the village of Zapel-Ausbau, where local farmers gave them food and water.

With Soviet forces several hours away, an SS officer with a few SS personnel in tow moved through the village at 9 am on 3 May 1945. Four German prisoners were given civilian clothes and let go. The remaining twenty-five, primarily Frenchmen and Hungarian Jews, were shot in the barn a couple of minutes later. After the SS had left, the farmers entered the scene and buried the corpses in a nearby mass grave.

The prisoners were the victims of the murderous ideological caprice of an unknown officer; there were many such acts on the death marches.

== Bibliography ==
- Blatman, Daniel (2011). The Death Marches: The Final Phase of Nazi Genocide. Translated by Galai, Chaya. Cambridge, Massachusetts: The Belknap Press of Harvard University Press. ISBN 978-0-674-05049-5.
