= Junkersdorf massacre =

1586 massacre

Junkersdorf Massacre
- Part of Cologne War (1583–1588)
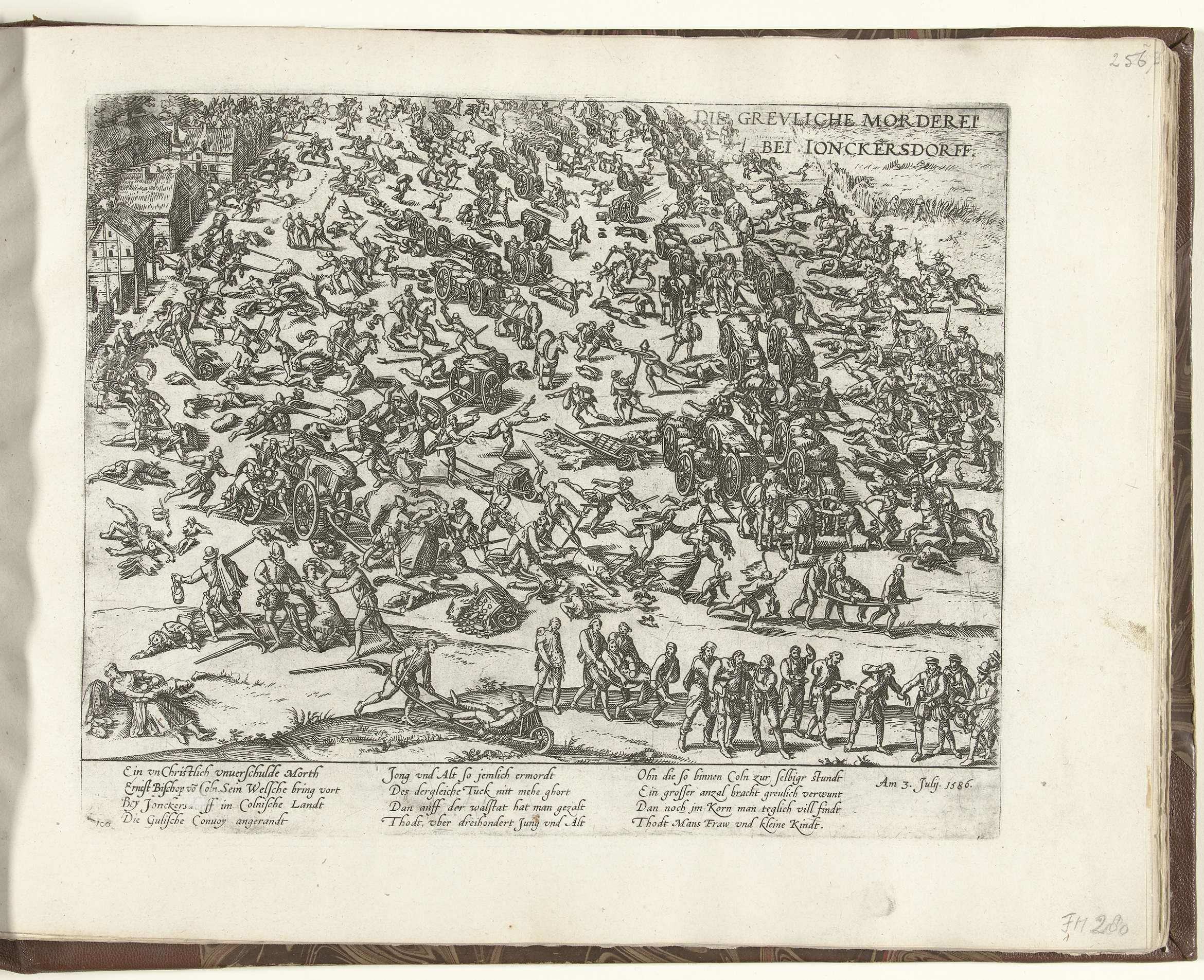
- Frans Hogenberg, Die Greuliche Morderei bei Jonckersdorff (1586–1588)
- Location: 50°55′55″N 6°51′26″E; Junkersdorf, now part of Lindenthal, Cologne
- Date: 3 July 1586 shortly after noon
- Deaths: at least 108
- Injuries: over 100
- Victim: civilian convoy commanded by Lord von Efferen
- Perpetrators: Spanish, Italian and Walloon cavalrymen and German infantrymen
- Motive: Plunder

The Junkersdorf massacre (3 July 1586) was an incident in the Cologne War of 1583–1588.

== Event ==
On Thursday, 3 July 1586, a convoy of about 800 persons, formed in Bergheim to bring travellers from the Duchy of Jülich to the weekly market in Cologne, was ambushed by marauding soldiers near the village of Junkersdorf (now part of Cologne's Third District). At least 108 were killed and over 100 injured.

In the account of the Cologne diarist Hermann Weinsberg, whose brother-in-law Steffen Horn was injured in the attack, "The ruffians murdered, stabbed and pitifully killed many, plundered the people and the wagons, took some prisoners, horses and booty with them, stripped noble maidens and good folk and left them naked". The perpetrators were soldiers in the service of Archbishop-Elector Ernest of Bavaria, from the garrisons of Worringen and Rodenkirchen.

== Aftermath ==
News of the massacre reached the city of Cologne at 2 in the afternoon of 3 July, causing consternation. Many citizens went out with food and drink to tend to the survivors, and the city council ordered taverns to take in survivors, and barber surgeons to treat the wounded. On 4 July the city council ordered the bodies of the slain be buried: 108 bodies were found at the site. On 8 July a spokesman conveyed Ernest of Bavaria's apologies to the city council of Cologne. A number of the leaders of the raid were later hanged, including "a Moor who had before been dear to his electoral grace".

The Flemish engraver Frans Hogenberg, then living in Cologne, produced a print commemorating the slaughter.
