= Celle massacre =

1945 massacre of Nazi concentration camp escapees

The Celle massacre (euphemistically called "Celler Hasenjagd", "hare chase of Celle") was a massacre of concentration camp inmates that took place in Celle, Prussian Hanover, in the last weeks of the Second World War. On 8 April 1945 over 3,000 internees being transported to Bergen-Belsen concentration camp were killed in an Allied air raid and subsequent attacks on survivors by SS guards, Gestapo, and Nazi party officials, as well as members of the public. Some of the perpetrators of the massacre were later tried but all of those convicted for the crime were set free in the early 1950s.

== Events ==
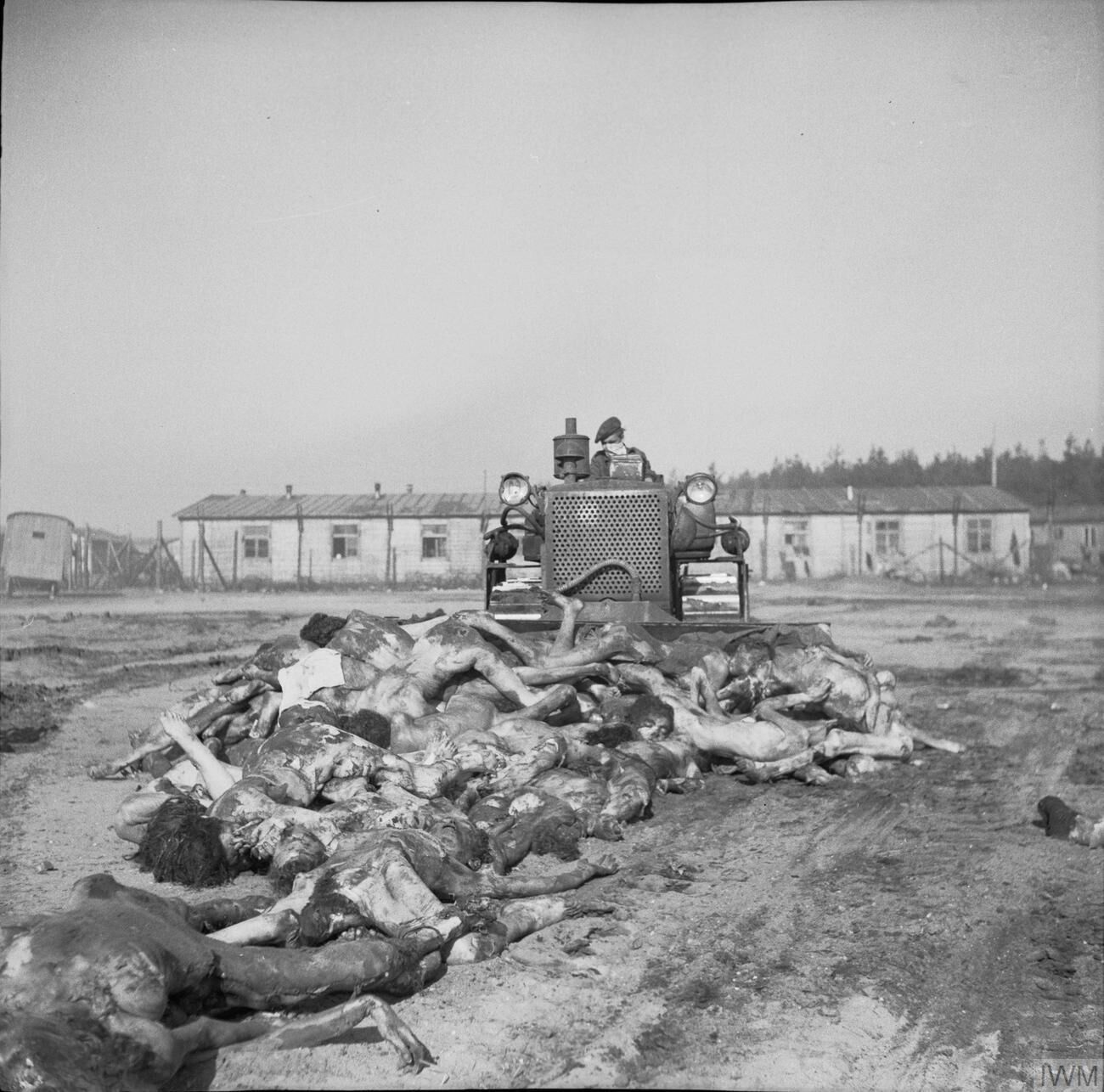
A British Army bulldozer pushes dead bodies into a mass grave at Belsen, 19 April 1945

On 8 April 1945, a month before the unconditional surrender of Germany, transports from several concentration camps were hit in an airstrike. 2,862 Ukrainian, Russian, Polish, Dutch, and French nationals from the Drütte camp, a subcamp to the Neuengamme concentration camp, were forced into freight cars located at the Celle yard en route to the Bergen-Belsen concentration camp. This transport had joined others the day before, making the total count around 4,000 men and women. On this transport, many internees died of exhaustion and malnutrition. The freight train carrying the internees stopped next to an ammunition train, which exploded during the air raid. In the ensuing inferno, most of the wagons carrying the internees were destroyed and a number of prisoners lost their lives. The surviving prisoners fled either into the town or westward towards the Neustadt wood while SS troops opened fire on them. As soon as the air raid was over, the SS guards, civilians who were members of the local Nazi party, Gestapo members, the fire-brigade and members of the public pursued the fleeing internees.

The internees who were caught and survived were detained on the spot near the Neustadt wood. Some 30 persons were executed on suspicion of looting. Most of the surviving internees were marched to Bergen-Belsen, while others were detained at the army's Heide barracks. Of the approximately 4,000 prisoners who had been in Celle on 8 April only 487 survivors reached Bergen-Belsen on the morning of 10 April — the same day British forces entered Celle. Some prisoners may have been shot on the 25 km march to the camp, some died at Heidekaserne military barracks nearby, left to die with no food, water or medication. They were discovered by the 15th (Scottish) Infantry Division, British 2nd Army, on 10 April.

== Aftermath ==
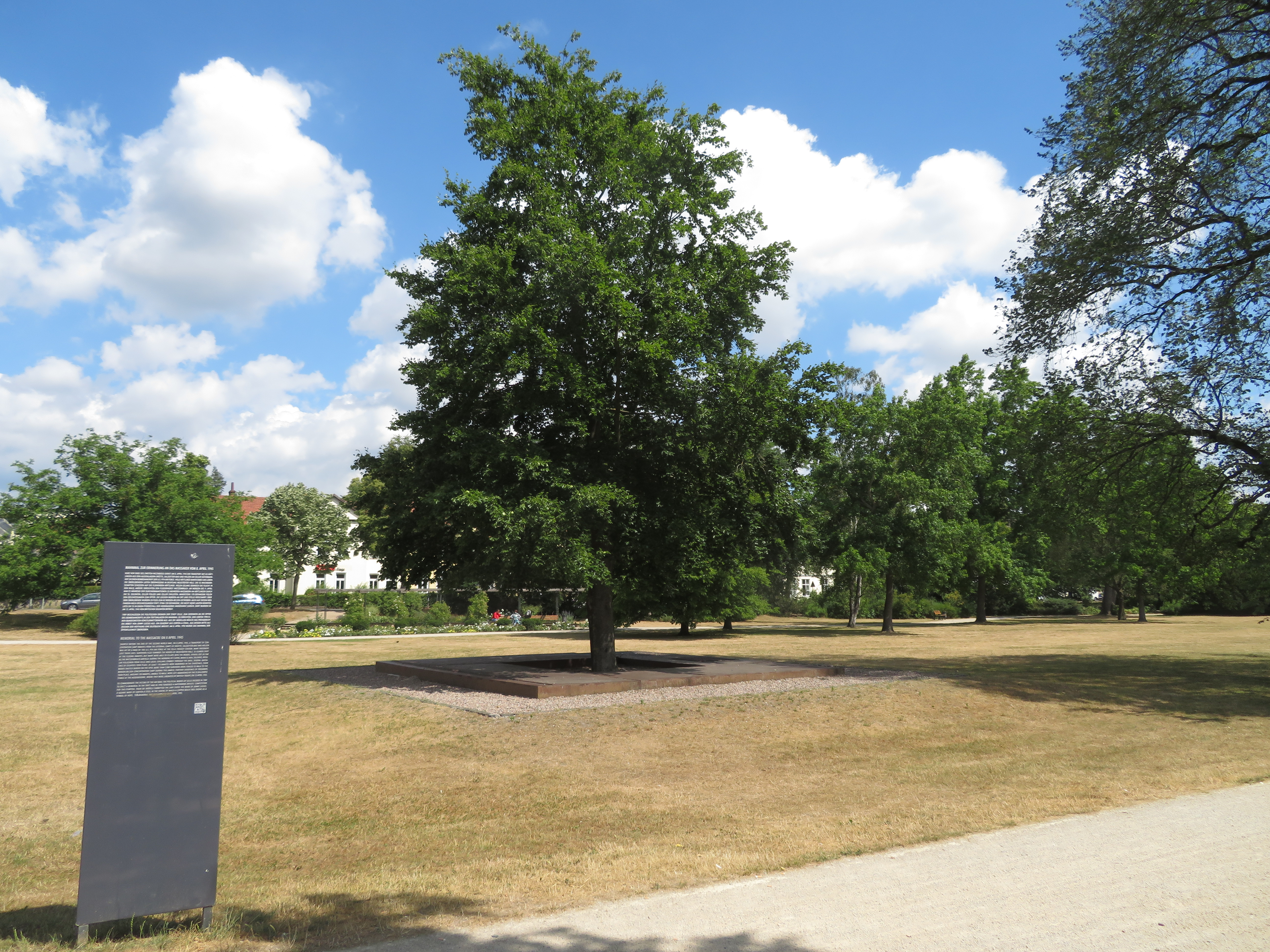
Memorial and copper beech tree in Triftanlagen Park in Celle (2022)

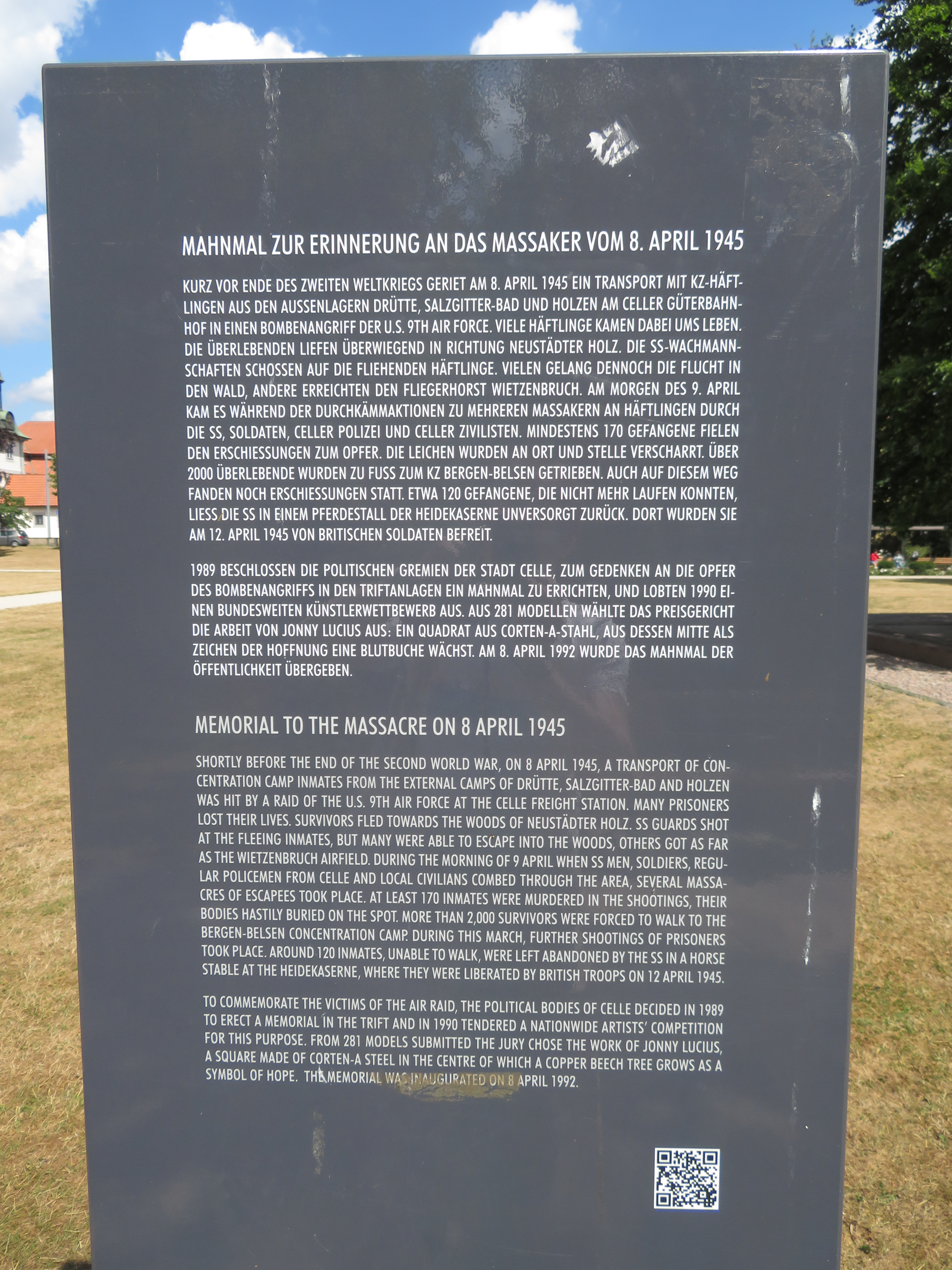
Information board in Triftanlagen Park in Celle (2022)

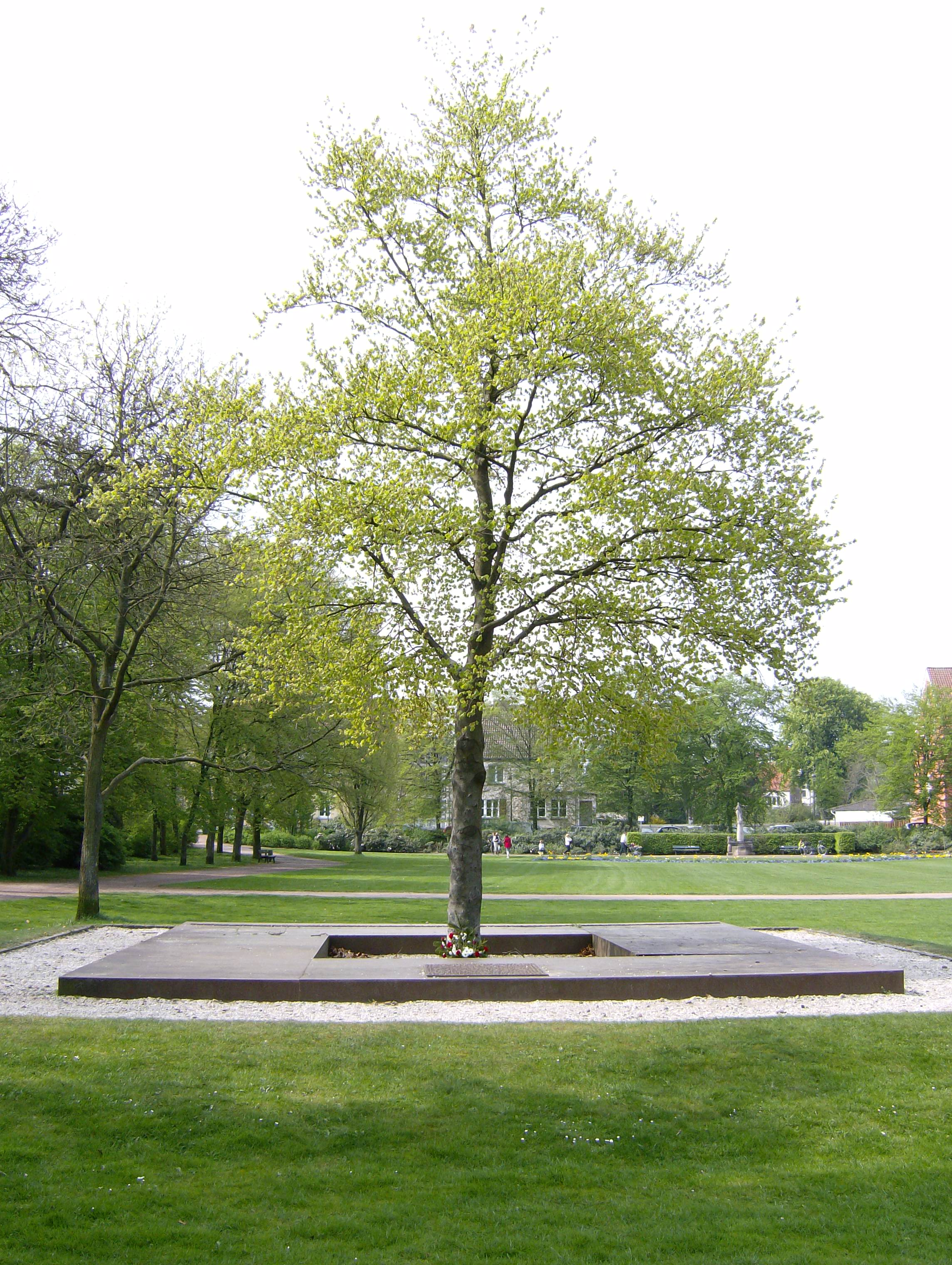
Memorial in Celle

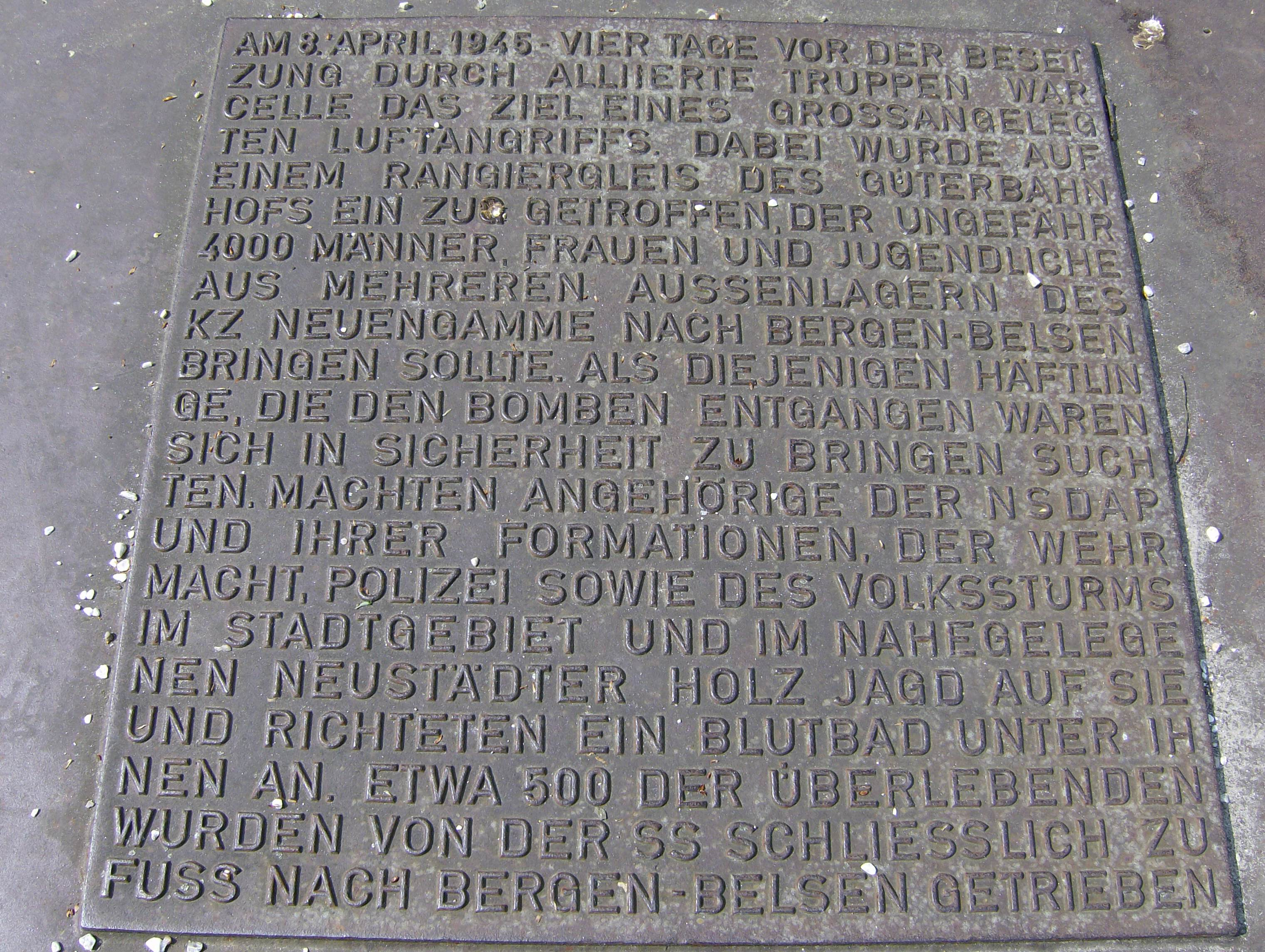
Memorial inscription at the foot of the tree in Celle

The British Army liberated Celle on 12 April and launched an investigation into the events of 8 April – 11 April. Their chronicler characterized the Heidekaserne as a "microcosm of Bergen-Belsen". Estimates place the number of "hare hunt" victims at 200–300; the remaining transport prisoners died of other causes.

Only 14 military and police personnel and political leaders were tried in the Celle Massacre Trial, which began in December 1947. Seven were acquitted of murder or accessory to murder because of insufficient evidence, whereas four were found guilty as perpetrators and sentenced to between four and ten years in prison. In addition, three were sentenced to death. One of the death sentences was overturned on appeal and the other two were reduced to 15–20 years' imprisonment as part of a clemency issued by the British military governor. All those imprisoned were released by October 1952 for good behaviour.

A memorial was inaugurated in Triftanlagen Park in Celle on 8 April 1992 and a copper beech tree was planted. The German word for copper beech means "Blutbuche" (blood beech).

== See also ==
- List of massacres in Germany
- Mühlviertler Hasenjagd
- Nazi concentration camps
