= Junkersdorf =

Historic village in Cologne, Germany

Coordinates: 50.9319°N 6.8572°E

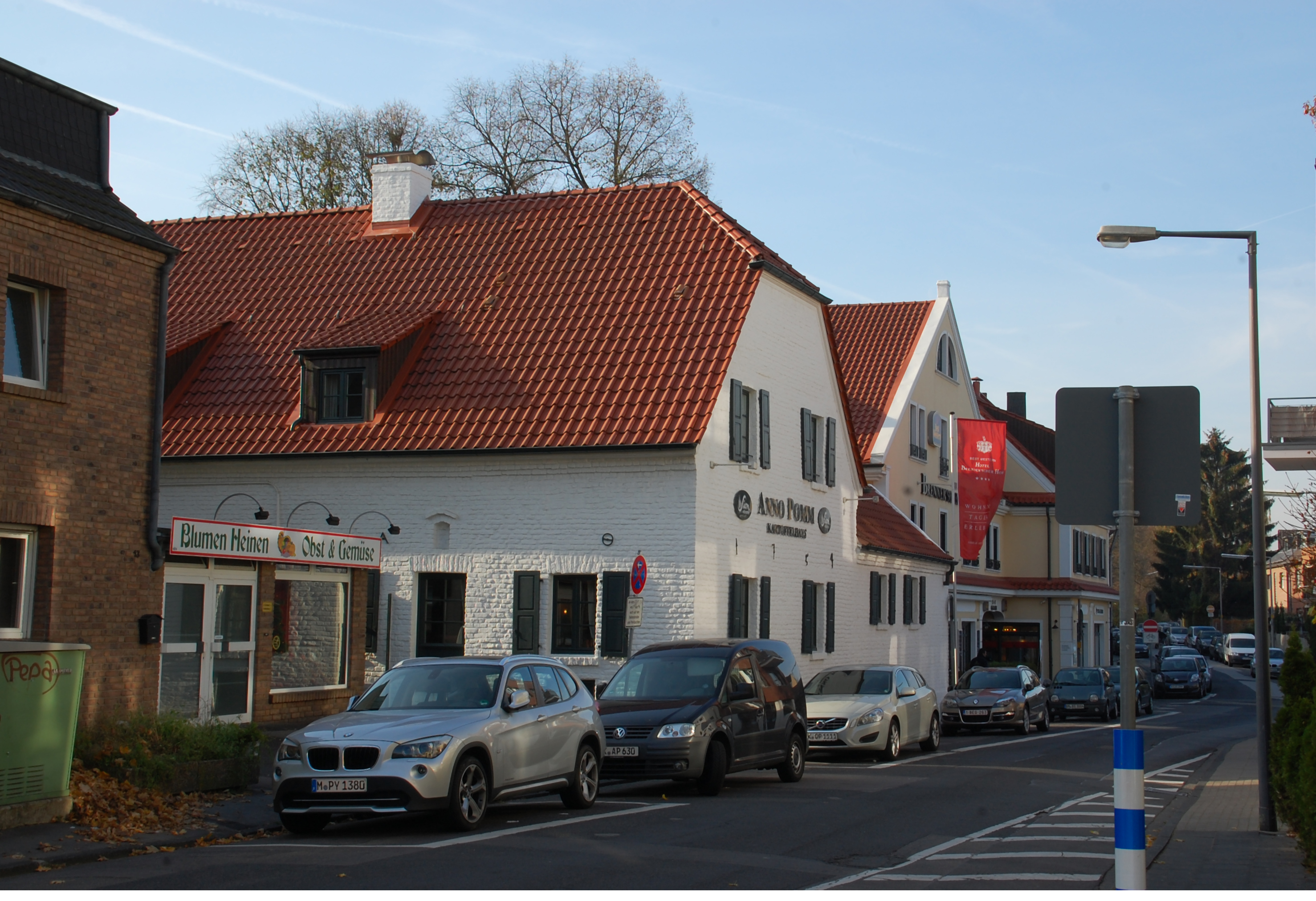
Listed building at Wilhelm von Capitaine Str. 15, Junkersdorf

Junkersdorf (German pronunciation: [ˈjʊŋkɐsdɔʁf]) is a historic village, now quarter 306 of the city of Cologne, Germany, in District Three.

== Geography ==
Junkersdorf lies to the west of the historic city centre, next to the Köln-West motorway junction where Bundesautobahn 1 and Bundesautobahn 4 intersect. The old road from Cologne to Jülich runs north of the village, and from Cologne to Aachen to the south.

== History ==
The earliest mention of Junkersdorf is in a charter of Bruno, Archbishop of Cologne, dating from 962. The first reference to a parish church was in 1223. From the early 15th century until 1794 Junkersdorf was an independent lordship within the Electorate of Cologne. During the French period, Junkersdorf became part of nearby Lövenich (now Cologne quarter 308). In 1975 Junkersdorf became part of the City of Cologne.

In 1586, during the Cologne War (1583–1588) it was the site of the Junkersdorf Massacre, when marauding soldiers attacked a civilian convoy.

In the 1920s a number of Bauhaus residences were built.

== Famous inhabitants ==
- Klaus Bednarz, (1943–2015), journalist and writer.
- Mirja Boes, (born 1971), comedian and actress
- Karl-Erivan Haub, (1960–2018), businessman
- Hannes Löhr, (1942–2016), football player and manager
- Fritz Pott, (1939–2015), football player
- Willy Schneider (1905–1989), singer
