= Borkum Island war crimes trial =

Borkum Island Massacre
- Location: Borkum Island
- Date: August 4, 1944
- Attack type: Massacre
- Deaths: 7 U.S. POWs
- Perpetrator: Nazi Germany

The Borkum Island war crimes trial involved the prosecution of ten German soldiers and five German civilians accused and found guilty of war crimes committed on the island of Borkum against seven American airmen during World War II. The airmen had been deliberately exposed to harassment and subsequently executed.

== Background ==
The Borkum Island war trial followed the aftermath of the execution of seven United States Army Air Forces airmen by Wehrmacht soldiers stationed on the island of Borkum. On August 4, 1944, Boeing B-17G-75-BO 43-37909 of the 486th BG, crashed into Borkum Island, the site of a German military base.

The airmen aboard included three second lieutenants and four sergeants (Pilot: 2Lt Harvey M Walthall, Co-Pilot: 2Lt William J Myers, Bombardier: 2Lt Howard S Graham, Radio Operator: T/Sgt Kenneth Faber, Ball Turret Gunner: S/Sgt James W Danno, Waist Gunner S/Sgt William F Dold, Tail Gunner: S/Sgt William W Lambertus). All seven airmen survived the crash and surrendered to the German soldiers present on the island.

In accordance with typical procedures, the American prisoners should have been handed off to a nearby German naval base and relocated to a prisoner gathering point in the heart of Nazi Germany. However, upon being handed over to the commanding officers on Borkum, the prisoners were marched through the streets of the island and left vulnerable to attack by civilians. The citizens of Borkum were incited by Jan Akkermann, the town mayor and the leader of the local Nazi Party, to assault the airmen. During the beating, Howard Graham collapsed after being struck by an air raid policeman named Mammenga. A German private whose family had been killed in the Allied bombing of Hamburg then shot Graham as he lay on the ground. Graham was moved to an office and given first aid, but he soon died.

Following the march, the American airmen were shot and executed at the hands of the German soldiers. The military authorities then attempted to hide their involvement and placed blame on the civilian authorities for failing to control the situation. An official memorandum submitted by Kurt Goebell, the ranking officer on Borkum Island, which attributed the deaths of the airmen to injuries sustained during the beating was signed by all members of the guard detail. Scholars point to the "decree" of Joseph Goebbels' propaganda as one potential inspiration for the massacre.

Shortly after the incident the island came under British occupation. From this occupation, an intelligence report was filed and followed up on through an investigation by a United States Army Intelligence Corps unit.

== Trial ==
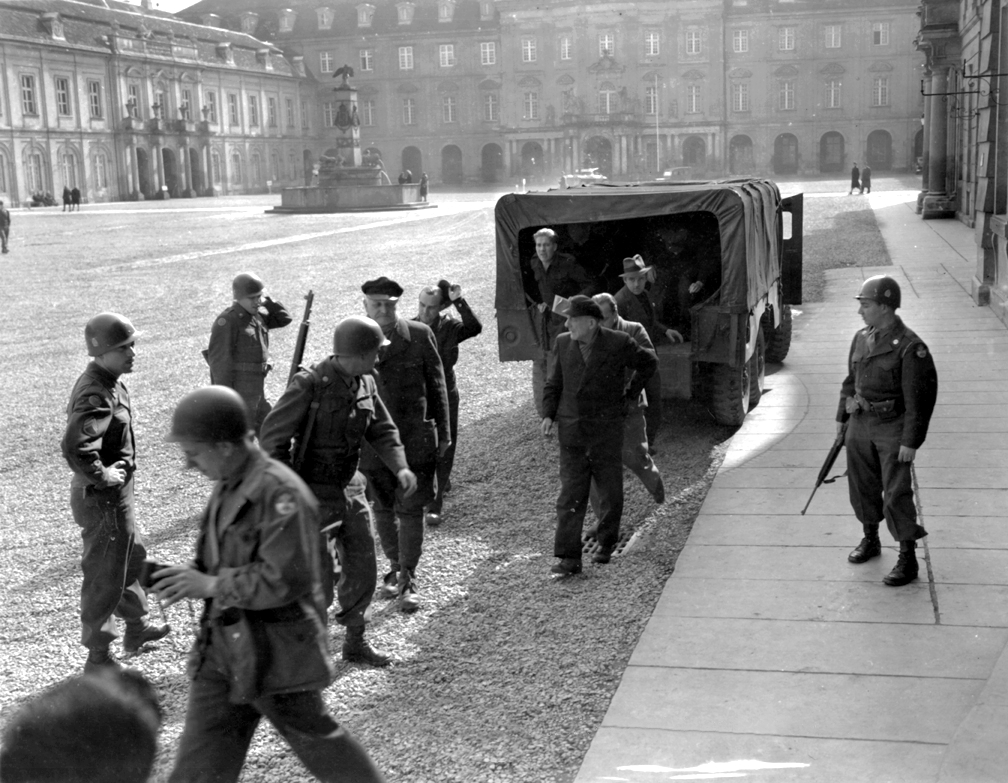
Defendants exit a transport vehicle.

=== Overview ===
Following the British occupation of Borkum, a more substantive investigation was conducted by a United States Army Intelligence Corps team. With this background, the Borkum Island war trial itself took place at Ludwigsburg Palace between February 6 and March 22, 1946 in the case of U.S. v Kurt Goebell et al. The court found all accused guilty of "common criminal design" and some members guilty of unlawful murder.

The trial was conducted by a combination of American and German defense counsels. Each American counsel was assigned defense of three groups of officers, soldiers, and civilians. The German counsel members were assigned one defendant each.

=== Accusations ===
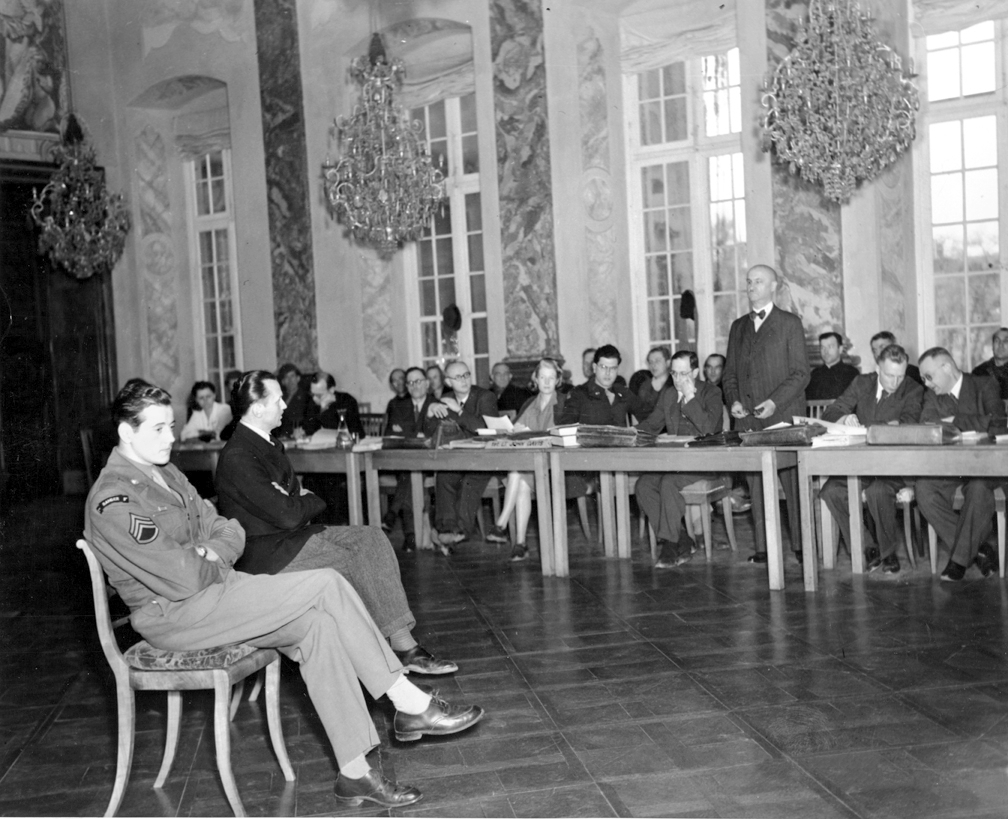
The defense counsel addresses the court.

Charges were brought against 23 German persons and others who could not be located for the crimes against the seven United States airmen. Although 23 individuals were accused of wrongdoing, only 15 were identified and tried in court. Several key figures in the massacre, such as the private accused of shooting Howard Graham, were not among the defendants. Of the crowd that abused the soldiers, not all of them could be identified, named, and brought before the court.

The charges stated that the accused had "willfully, deliberately, and wrongfully, encouraged, aided, abetted, and participated in a violation of the laws of war by the killing of and by assault upon the named seven person who were then surrendered prisoners of war in the custody of the then German Reich".

=== Trial ===
The prosecution demonstrated that the American soldiers' march had been deliberately planned by the Wehrmacht soldiers on Borkum. With the route's plan in mind, the prosecution argued that the route had exposed the soldiers to a maximum potential for violence from civilians. Additionally, eyewitness testimony was brought forth. Civilians at the march stated, guards "constantly beat and kicked the fliers throughout the march."

In terms of logistics, the trial was conducted in English and then translated into German, and back again. Additionally, the trial was open to those in the public and press, which both American and German journalists attended.

Much as in other war crimes trials of the era, the verdicts that were handed down were those of either guilty or not guilty, in this case for the counts of murder and assault. In all cases, except for Meyer-Gerhards, the accused received punishment. In many of the cases, the sentences were reduced from their previous issue.

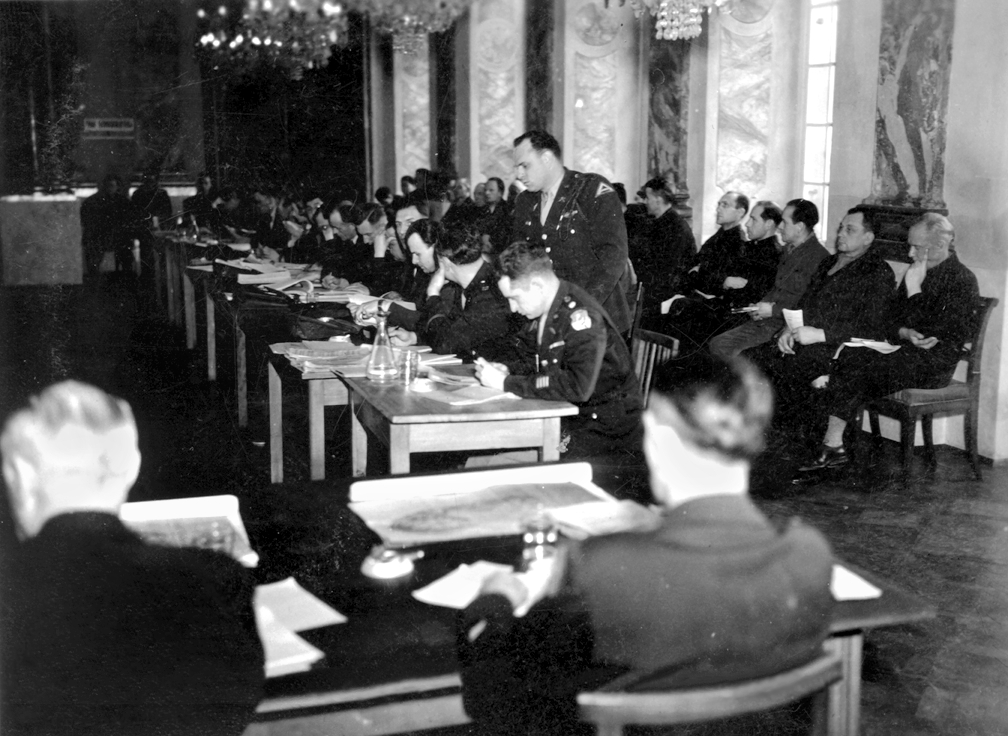
The defense was coordinated by Lieutenant Colonel Samuel Hogan, seated at center.

=== Verdicts and sentences ===
Name	Murder	Assault	Sentence
Akkermann, Jan J.	Guilty	Guilty	Death (executed on October 15, 1948)
Albrecht, Guenther	Not guilty	Guilty	6 years
Geyer, Karl	Not guilty	Guilty	4 years
Goebell, Kurt	Guilty	Guilty	Death (reduced to life imprisonment, then 32 years, then 28 years; paroled on February 21, 1956)
Heinemann, Heinrich	Not guilty	Guilty	18 years (reduced to 10 years)
Krolikovski, Walter	Guilty	Guilty	Life imprisonment (reduced to 10 years)
Mammenga, Gustav	Not guilty	Guilty	5 years
Meyer-Gerhards, Klaus	Not guilty	Not guilty	Acquitted
Pointner, Johann	Not guilty	Guilty	5 years
Rommel, Heinrich	Not guilty	Guilty	2 years (acquitted on appeal)
Schmitz, Johann Josef	Guilty	Guilty	Death (executed on October 15, 1948)
Seiler, Jakob	Guilty	Guilty	Death (reduced to life imprisonment; paroled in October 1953)
Weber, Karl	Not guilty	Guilty	25 years (reduced to 10 years)
Wentzel, Erich	Guilty	Guilty	Death (executed on December 3, 1948)
Witzke, Heinz	Not guilty	Guilty	11 years (reduced to 6 years)

Only Meyer-Gerhards was acquitted on both charges at trial, albeit Rommel was acquitted on appeal. Goebell was released on parole on February 21, 1956. He was last remaining defendant serving prison time for the massacre.

== See also ==
- Law of war
- Military justice
- War crime
- List of war crimes
- War crimes of the Wehrmacht
- Nuremberg trials
- Dachau trials
- Prisoners of war
- Nazi Germany
- Allied forces (World War II)
- Edward F. Lyons, Jr.
