= Borkum =

Island and municipality in Lower Saxony, Germany

- Town
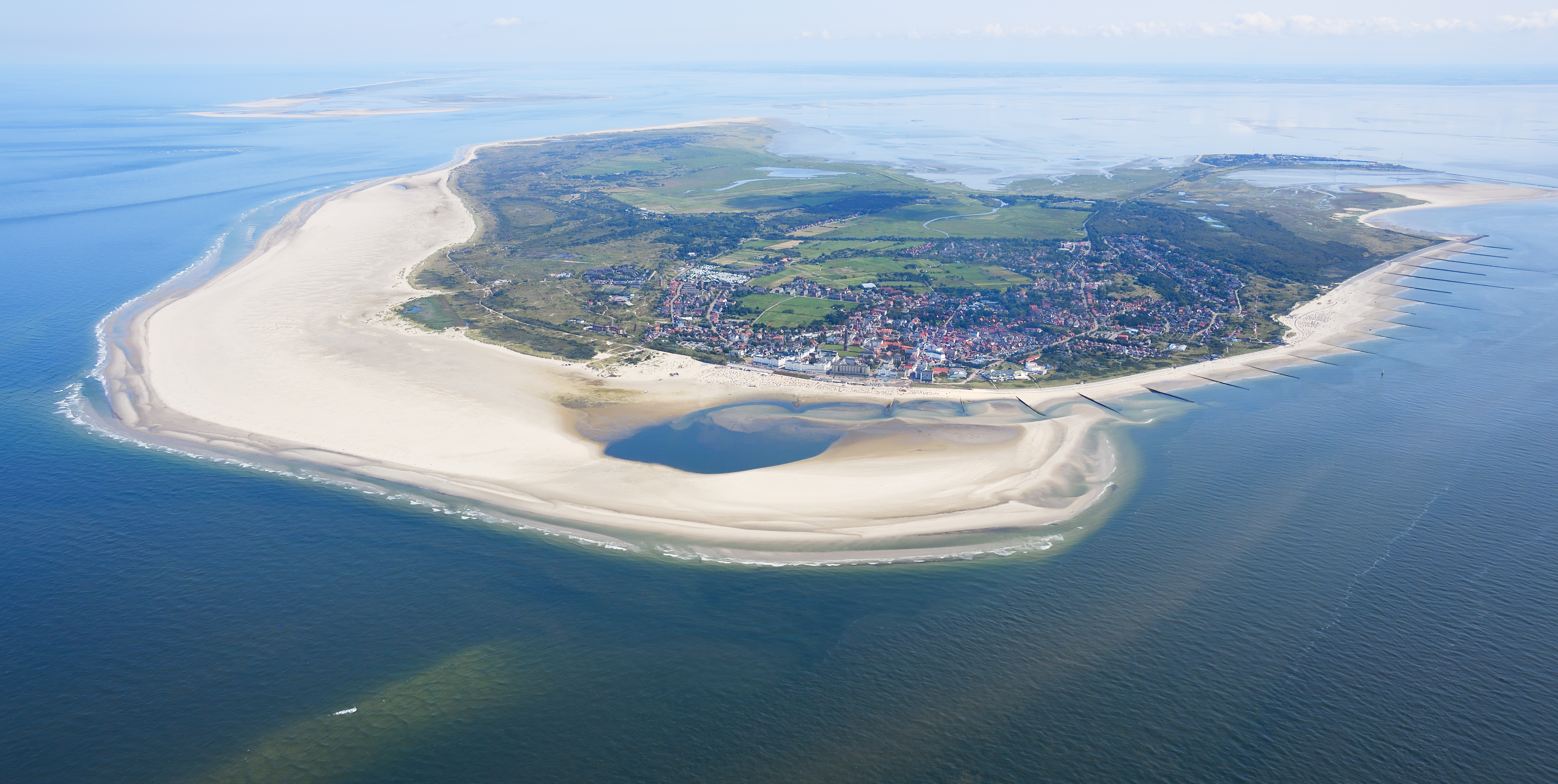
- Aerial view of Borkum

- Flag Coat of arms

- Location of Borkum within Leer district
- Interactive map of Borkum
- Location within Germany Location within Lower Saxony
- Coordinates: 53°35′17″N 06°40′11″E
- Country: Germany
- State: Lower Saxony
- District: Leer

Government
  - Mayor (2019–24): Jürgen Tönjes Akkermann (Ind.)

Area
  - Total: 30.98 km^{2} (11.96 sq mi)
- Elevation: 6 m (20 ft)

Population (2025-12-31)
  - Total: 4,295
  - Density: 138.6/km^{2} (359.1/sq mi)
- Time zone: UTC+01:00 (CET)
  - Summer (DST): UTC+02:00 (CEST)
- Postal codes: 26757
- Dialling codes: +49 4922
- Vehicle registration: LER
- Website: www.stadt-borkum.de

Borkum (German pronunciation: [ˈbɔʁkʊm]; East Frisian Low Saxon: Börkum) is an island and a town in the Leer District in Lower Saxony, northwestern Germany. It is situated in the Wadden Sea, to the east of Rottumeroog and west of Juist. In 2025 a tradition where boys would chase girls to beat their buttocks each 5 December was discontinued.

== Geography ==
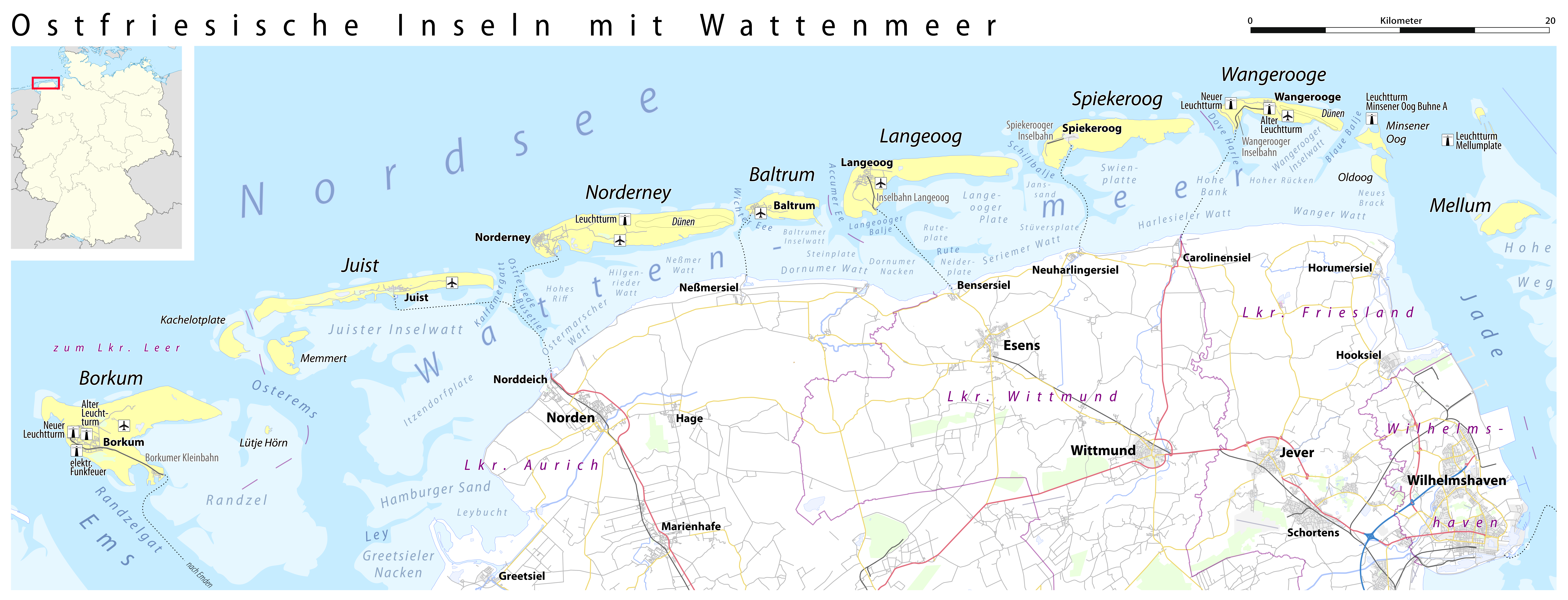
Island location (left)

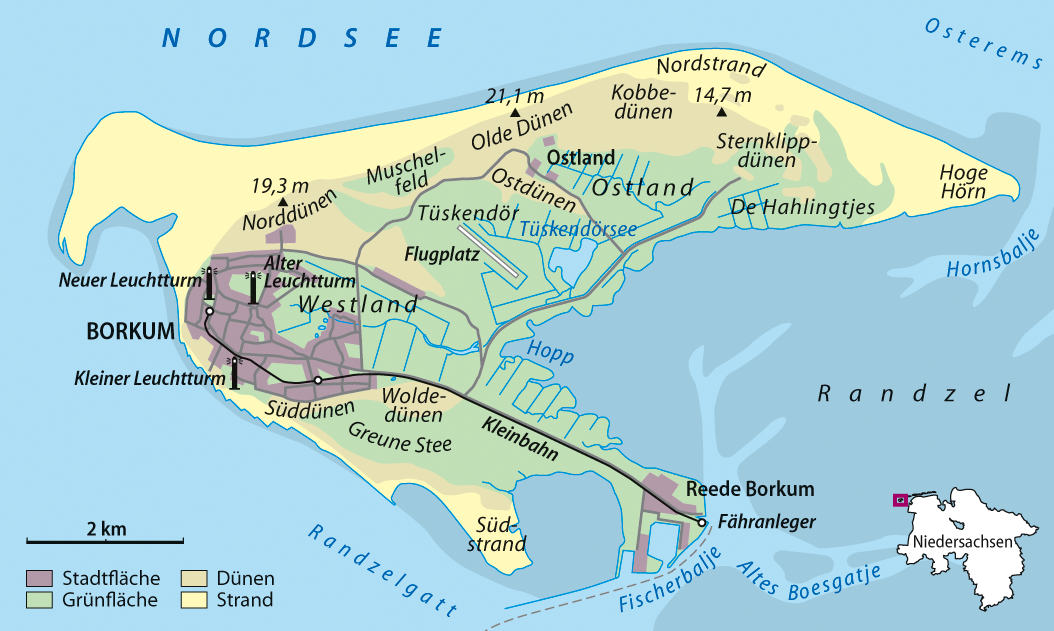
Island map

Borkum is bordered to the west by the Westerems strait (which forms the border with the Netherlands), to the east by the Osterems strait, to the north by the North Sea, and to the south by the Wadden Sea. It is the largest and westernmost of the East Frisian Islands in the North Sea, due north of the Dutch province of Groningen.

The island was formed in 1863 by two previously separate islands which were still separated by a shallow water. The seam between the former eastern and western parts is called Tüskendör ("through in between").

=== Climate ===
Borkum is the only East Frisian island that is under the influence of the North Sea all year round thanks to its 30 km (16 nmi) distance from the mainland. The maritime climate is influenced by the Gulf Stream and the west wind zone with correspondingly high humidity throughout the year. This ensures varied weather with much sun and wind but also occasional rain and showers. Compared to the mainland, the climate has much milder winters and cooler summers without extremely cold or hot days. This is due to the buffering effect of the sea, which warms up slowly in spring and summer, but stores the heat longer into autumn.

== History ==
Mentioned as Burchana fabaria (island of beans) by both Strabo and Pliny the Elder, Borkum by the time of Charlemagne was part of a larger island called Bant, which consisted of the present day islands of Borkum, Juist, and the western part of Norderney.

In 1484, Bant passed to the Earls of East Frisia, who developed trade, and the island became known as a centre of piracy and whaling. By 1781, violent storms in the 18th century divided Bant into three islands. As whaling decreased, the inhabitants became impoverished, and many left, with the island's population falling from 852 in 1776 to 406 by 1811. The first tourists arrived on the island in 1834, and the local economy improved as a tourist resort.

In Mexico as I saw it, published by Thomas Nelson, Mrs Alec Tweedie, writing in 1911 about a trip in 1900 to Mexico, compares the brick roads of Monterrey, Mexico with those of Borkum, "the one spot on earth from which Jews are banished". This had to do with the aggressive and successful campaign of German tourists to keep Borkum free from Jewish visitors, as celebrated in the antisemitic "Borkum-Lied".

In 1910, British officers Captain Bernard Frederick Trench and Lieutenant Vivian H. Brandon were imprisoned for espionage for photographing the military installations on the island.

On 19 and 20 December 1934, Wernher von Braun launched "Max" and "Moritz", the two prototypes of the A2-rocket.

In 1944, the island was the site of the massacre of 7 American POWs. After the war, these murders were prosecuted in the Borkum Island war crimes trial.

In November 2024, the German press revealed the existence of the Klaasohm festival, held every 5 December for decades and still ongoing. This hidden festival allows packs of young men to chase women and spank them with cows' horns, sometimes causing bruises and hematomas. The festival is endorsed by the island authorities. Victims reported in the press that even minors and pregnant women are not spared. In 2025 the tradition was discontinued.

== Energy ==
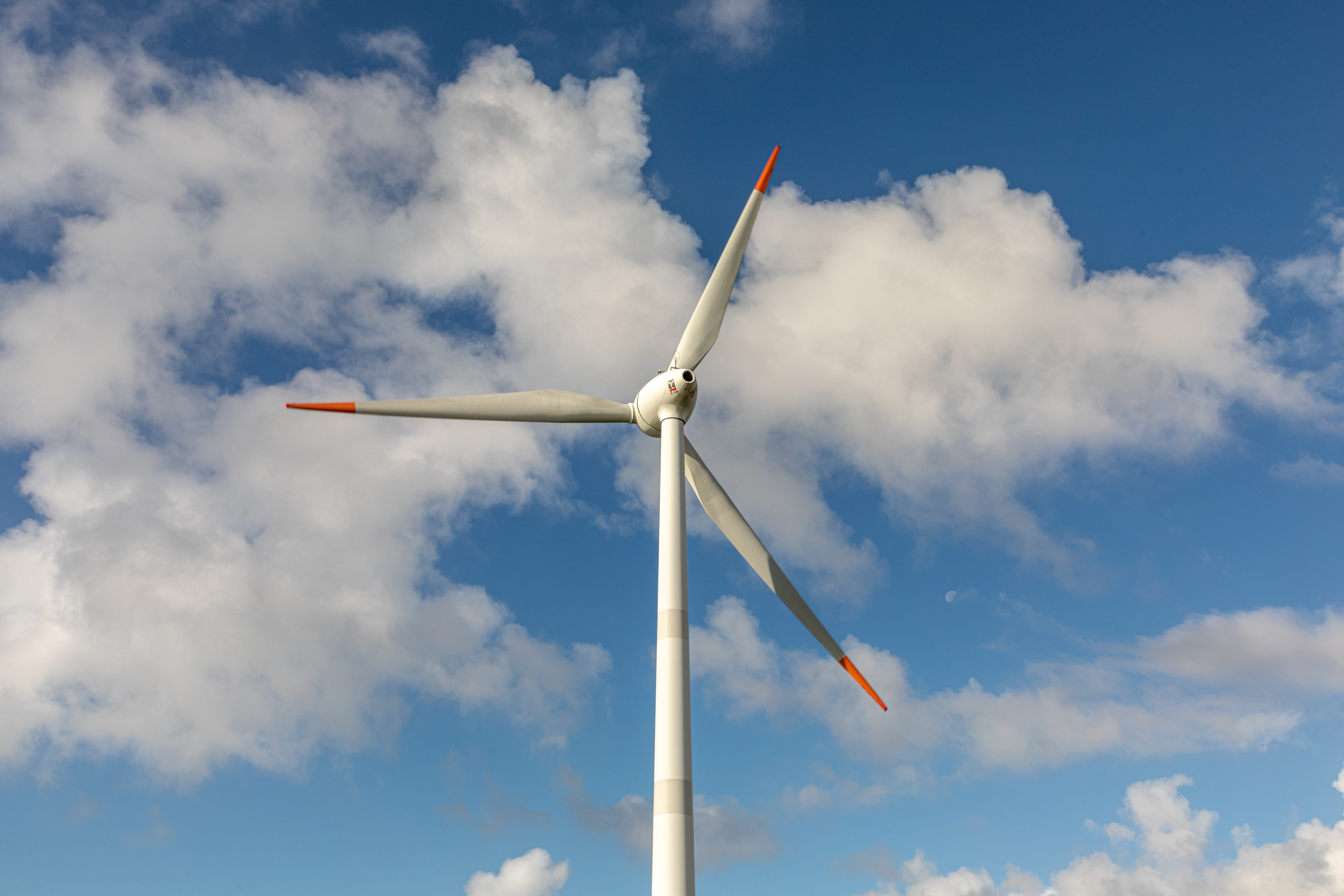
One of the two wind turbines on the island

An offshore wind park of 40 wind turbines have been connected since 2015. On the island, close to the port are two wind turbines constructed in 1993 and 2002.

== Transport ==
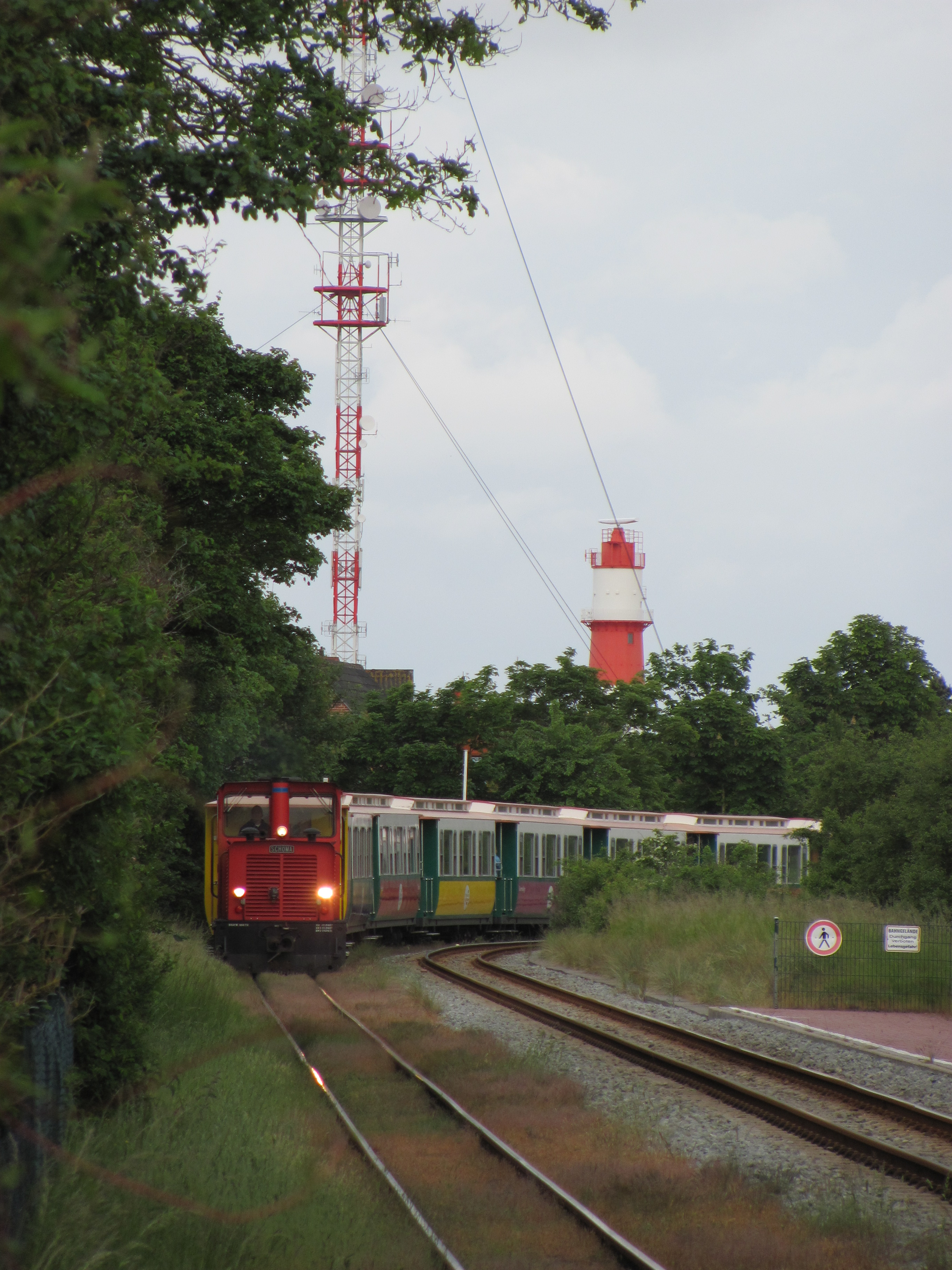
Train of the Borkum Kleinbahn

The island is partially car-free. Off-season, driving by car is permitted everywhere, otherwise there are car-free zones. The only town on the island is also called Borkum. There is an airfield in the Tüskendör area. Borkum is served by ferries from Emden, Germany and Eemshaven, the Netherlands. The Borkumer Kleinbahn narrow-gauge railway connects the harbour and the town of Borkum.

== See also ==
- List of ferry boats of the East Frisian Islands
