= Zapel =

- Municipality
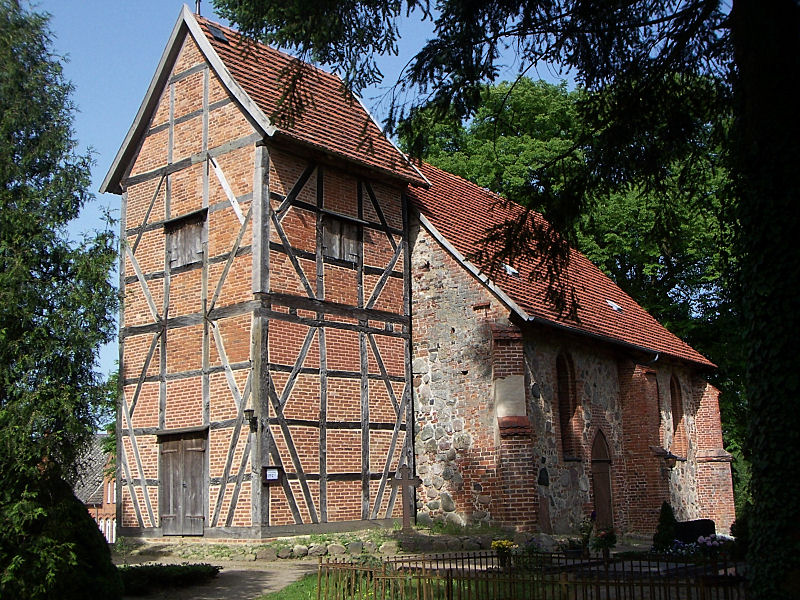
- Church

- Coat of arms

- Location of Zapel within Ludwigslust-Parchim district
- Interactive map of Zapel
- Location within Germany Location within Mecklenburg-Vorpommern
- Coordinates: 53°33′N 11°40′E
- Country: Germany
- State: Mecklenburg-Vorpommern
- District: Ludwigslust-Parchim
- Municipal assoc.: Crivitz
- Subdivisions: 3

Government
  - Mayor: Hans-Werner Wandschneider

Area
  - Total: 11.63 km^{2} (4.49 sq mi)
- Elevation: 61 m (200 ft)

Population (2025-12-31)
  - Total: 428
  - Density: 36.8/km^{2} (95.3/sq mi)
- Time zone: UTC+01:00 (CET)
  - Summer (DST): UTC+02:00 (CEST)
- Postal codes: 19089
- Dialling codes: 03863
- Vehicle registration: PCH
- Website: www.amt-crivitz.de/

Zapel (German pronunciation: [ˈtsaːpl̩]) is a municipality in the Ludwigslust-Parchim district, in Mecklenburg-Vorpommern, Germany.
