= Clare Hibbs Armstrong =

United States Army general (1894–1969)

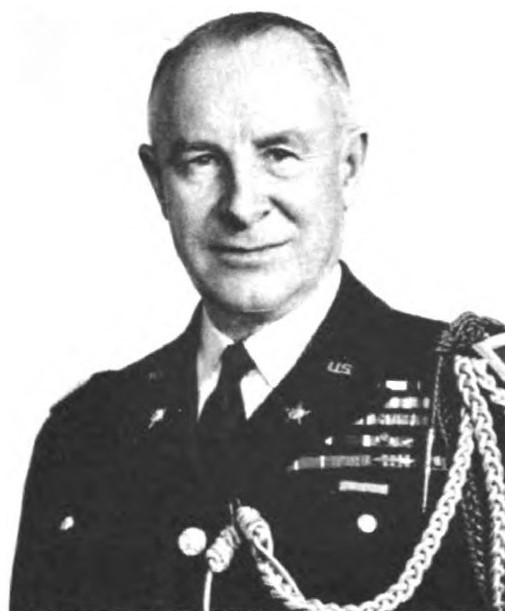
- Born: January 23, 1894; Albert Lea, Minnesota, U.S.
- Died: July 12, 1969 (aged 75); Hampton, Virginia, U.S.
- Burial place: West Point Cemetery
- Military career
- Allegiance: United States
- Branch: United States Army
- Service years: 1917–1953
- Rank: Brigadier General
- Service number: 0-5318
- Units: Infantry Branch; Coast Artillery Corps
- Commands: 50th Anti-Aircraft Artillery Brigade
- Conflicts: World War I; World War II; Normandy Campaign; Operation Market Garden; Battle of the Bulge
- Awards: Army Distinguished Service Medal; Bronze Star (2); Army Commendation Medal

Clare Hibbs Armstrong (January 23, 1894 – July 12, 1969) was a highly decorated officer in the United States Army with the rank of brigadier general. A graduate of the United States Military Academy, he was the commanding officer of the 50th Anti-Aircraft Artillery Brigade during the air defense of Antwerp during World War II. The 50th Anti-Aircraft Artillery Brigade destroyed 97% of all V-1 flying bombs aimed at the docking facilities that supplied the 12th and 21st Army Groups.

After the war, Armstrong remained in the army and served as military attaché for Belgium and Luxembourg, completing his career as the commanding general of the Third Army Anti-Aircraft Artillery Training Center at Camp Stewart, Georgia.

== Early career ==
Armstrong was born on January 23, 1894, in Albert Lea, Minnesota, the son of bank president and city councilman DeWitt Clinton Armstrong and Anna Hibbs. After high school, Armstrong received an appointment to the United States Military Academy at West Point, New York.

Armstrong's West Point class produced more than 55 future general officers, including two Army Chiefs of Staff – Joseph L. Collins and Matthew B. Ridgway. Other classmates include: Aaron Bradshaw Jr., Mark W. Clark, John T. Cole, Norman D. Cota, John M. Devine, William W. Eagles, Theodore L. Futch, Charles H. Gerhardt, Augustus M. Gurney, Ernest N. Harmon, William Kelly Harrison Jr., Robert W. Hasbrouck, Frederick A. Irving, Laurence B. Keiser, Charles S. Kilburn, Bryant E. Moore, Daniel Noce, Onslow S. Rolfe, Herbert N. Schwarzkopf, Albert C. Smith, George D. Wahl, Raymond E. S. Williamson, and George H. Weems.

Armstrong graduated, 120th in a class of 139, on April 20, 1917, with Bachelor of Science degree, shortly after the United States entered World War I, and was commissioned second lieutenant in the Infantry Branch. He was subsequently ordered to Fort McPherson, Georgia and attached to the 17th Infantry Regiment. He was promoted to first lieutenant on May 5, 1917, and to temporary captain on August 5, and assumed command of his regiment's rifle company. As his regiment was preparing for combat deployment in France, the Spanish flu hit it and half his company died. He was also struck with the disease, but was nursed back to the health with his wife's help.

After recovering, Armstrong rejoined his regiment and served with it at Chickamauga, Georgia, Tampa, Florida and Camp Meade, Maryland until November 1919, when he received a permanent promotion to captain and orders for transfer to Fort Benning, Georgia. There, Armstrong served as operations officer of garrison's Motor Transport Corps until February 1920, when he was ordered to Camp Funston, Kansas for duty as property officer of the 7th Division under Major General Edward McGlachlin Jr.

Armstrong spent almost a year in that capacity, departing in January 1921, when he was ordered to the Panama Canal Zone. He was assigned to the 42nd Infantry Regiment, consisting of Puerto Rican recruits. He was rifle company commander at Camp Gaillard and became interested in the still-developing anti-aircraft defense. Armstrong was so taken with this weapon that he requested transfer to the Coast Artillery Corps in November 1921. His first coast artillery assignment was with the 4th Company of Coast Artillery Regiment at Fort Amador, Panama Canal Zone and he remained in that capacity until December 1923, when he was ordered back to the United States. Armstrong transferred to the Coast Artillery in 1930.

Armstrong returned to the United States and served with coastal defense at Fort Hancock, New Jersey until July 1924, when he was ordered to the United States Military Academy at West Point for duty as an assistant instructor of tactics. He spent five years there and commanded Company of Cadets during his final year. Armstrong entered the Army Coast Artillery School at Fort Monroe, Virginia in August 1929.

Upon graduation a year later, Armstrong took a brief course at the Chemical Warfare School at Edgewood Arsenal, Maryland. After completing it in November 1930, he embarked for the Philippines. He was stationed at Fort Santiago, Manila and served as assistant for press relations in the Intelligence section until March 1931, when he joined the 92nd Coast Artillery Regiment (Philippine Scouts) at Fort Mills, Corregidor as battery commander. During his tenure as battery commander, his unit won a first "E" for excellence in gunnery in January 1932 and a second "E" in June 1932.

Following his return stateside in March 1932, Armstrong was attached to the 6th Coast Artillery Regiment at Fort Winfield Scott in San Francisco, California, and was promoted to major in March 1933. He participated with his unit in the exercise at Fort Worden, Washington and earned a third "E" for excellence in gunnery.

Two months later, he was ordered to Medford, Oregon, where he activated and commanded a local Civilian Conservation Corps District. During his one-year tenure, within the ongoing Great Depression, thousands of unemployed men attached to his command constructed bridges, firebreaks and cabins.

Armstrong served in Medford until August 1935, when he was ordered to the Army Command and General Staff School at Fort Leavenworth, Kansas. There he completed advanced courses in June 1936. He was subsequently ordered to Washington, D.C., and appointed Chief of the Personnel Section in the Office of the Chief of Coast Artillery under Major General Archibald H. Sunderland. His wife, Mary, died of cancer in August 1938.

In September 1938, Armstrong was ordered back to the United States Military Academy at West Point as Post Inspector and War Plans officer. He assumed command of West Point Service Detachment in May 1939 and was promoted to lieutenant colonel on July 1, 1940.

== World War II ==
Armstrong was temporarily promoted to colonel on December 11, 1941, four days after the Japanese attack on Pearl Harbor, and departed West in May 1942. He was subsequently ordered to Camp Haan, California and assumed command of the 86th Coast Artillery Regiment. His outfit was redesignated the 109th Coast Artillery Group in January 1943 and Armstrong was temporarily promoted to brigadier general on March 16, 1943.

For his new billet, Armstrong was ordered to Camp Davis, North Carolina in July 1943 and assumed command of the 50th Anti-Aircraft Artillery Brigade. He spent several months intensively preparing for combat deployment and embarked for the European Theater of Operations in February 1944. Armstrong and his brigade were stationed in the United Kingdom and participated in the Normandy campaign.

In October 1944, Armstrong was tasked with executing the Antwerp X Operation, which sought to protect the port of Antwerp and its residents against flying-bomb attacks. He formed a special defense anti-aircraft force, which included his own brigade, another U.S. anti-aircraft brigade, a British brigade and a Polish regiment—a total of 22,000 men designated for the defense of Antwerp. The port served as important operating logistical center, where most of the supplies from the United States were redistributed for Allied forces on the Continent.

Armstrong and his troops were deployed in France, Belgium, the Netherlands and Luxembourg, and destroyed 97% of all V-1 flying bombs aimed at the docking facilities in Antwerp.

During the later phase of World War II, Armstrong and part of his brigade supported Lieutenant General George S. Patton's Third Army during his advance in the Ardennes Campaign or Rhineland Campaign.

For his service during the defense of Antwerp, Patton awarded Armstrong the Army Distinguished Service Medal and two Bronze Stars, and made him commander of the Third Army, while the Belgian government bestowed him with the Order of Leopold, rank Commander, and the Croix de Guerre with Palm. The citation for Armstrong's DSM reads

The President of the United States of America, authorized by Act of Congress, July 9, 1918, takes pleasure in presenting the Army Distinguished Service Medal to Brigadier General Clare Hibbs Armstrong (ASN: 0-5318), United States Army, for exceptionally meritorious and distinguished services to the Government of the United States, in a duty of great responsibility, from November 1944 to April 1945, while Commanding the anti-aircraft artillery defense of Antwerp against Germany flying-bomb attacks. By the skillful tactical disposition of his forces and never ending relocation of units to meet threats from changing directions, General Armstrong threw about the vital Belgian port a cordon which at the end of the campaign was destroying 97 per cent of all V-1 robot bombs aimed at the docking facilities which supplied the 12th and ** Army Groups. In this operation he integrated the efforts of American, British, and Polish anti-aircraft artillery comprised of three brigades totally more than 22,000 men, molding a team which frustrated the German's all-out effort and made possible uninterrupted supply of Allied forces in their drive from the Roer to the Elbe. His great accomplishment was an outstanding contribution to the successful termination of the war in Europe.

The Allies decorated Armstrong with the Legion of Honour, French Croix de Guerre with Palm, the Order of the British Empire, Dutch Order of Orange Nassau, Luxembourg Order of the Oak Crown and Luxembourg War Cross.

== Postwar service ==
Following Nazi Germany's surrender in May 1945, Armstrong joined the headquarters of the 15th Army under Patton and served as its chief anti-aircraft officer during the occupation of Germany until April 1946. He then reverted to his peacetime rank of colonel and assumed duty as Chief of Guided Missiles, Coast Artillery & Anti-Aircraft Artillery Group Plans Section, Headquarters Anti-Aircraft Forces.

Armstrong returned to Belgium in December 1946 and assumed duty as military attaché for Belgium and Luxembourg. He was made a Freeman of Antwerp, a distinction shared only with Winston Churchill, General Dwight D. Eisenhower, and Field Marshall Bernard L. Montgomery. A bust of him is displayed in Antwerp's city hall.

After the Korean War broke out, Armstrong was again promoted to brigadier general on September 27, 1950, and ordered back to the United States in December. Due to his knowledge and experiences with anti-aircraft artillery, he was appointed commanding general of the Third Army Anti-Aircraft Artillery Training Center at Camp Stewart, Georgia. He was tasked with training anti-aircraft artillery crews as replacements for troops in Korea and received an Army Commendation Medal.

== Retirement ==
Armstrong remained in that capacity until March 31, 1953, when he retired from active duty after almost 36 years of service. He then worked as consultant for U.S. and Belgian weapons manufacturer companies and later settled in Mallorca, in the Balearic Islands of Spain. While there he met Catherine Hays Taylor, a widow from Ligonier, Pennsylvania, and they were married in 1955.

They settled in Hampton, Virginia, where Armstrong died on July 12, 1969, aged 75. He was buried with full military honors at United States Military Academy Post Cemetery beside his first wife, Mary. Armstrong was survived by his three children from his first marriage, sons Clare Jr. and DeWitt and daughter Elizabeth. His sons graduated from the United States Military Academy. Clare Jr. retired as lieutenant colonel and DeWitt reached the rank of brigadier general and completed his service as commanding general at Fort Devens.

== Decorations ==
Here is Armstrong's ribbon bar:

| 1st Row | Army Distinguished Service Medal | | Bronze Star Medal with Oak Leaf Cluster | |
| 2nd Row | Army Commendation Medal | World War I Victory Medal | American Defense Service Medal | American Campaign Medal |
| 3rd Row | European-African-Middle Eastern Campaign Medal with four 3/16 inch service stars | World War II Victory Medal | Army of Occupation Medal | National Defense Service Medal |
| 4th Row | Order of Leopold, rank Commander (Belgium) | Belgian Croix de Guerre with Palm | Commander of the Most Excellent Order of the British Empire | Knight of the Legion of Honor (France) |
| 5th Row | French Croix de guerre 1939-1945 with Palm | Order of Orange-Nassau, rank Commander (Netherlands) | Order of the Oak Crown, rank Commander (Luxembourg) | Luxembourg War Cross |
