= George Douglas Wahl =

American World War II Brigadier General

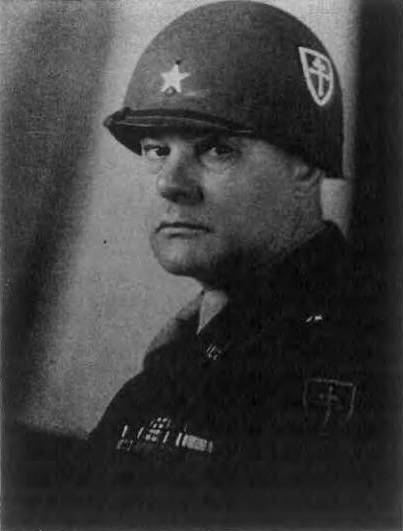
- Wahl c. 1946
- Born: October 15, 1895; New Orleans, Louisiana, United States
- Died: July 12, 1969 (aged 73); Carmel, California, United States
- Relatives: MG Lutz Wahl (father)
- Military career
- Allegiance: United States
- Branch: United States Army
- Service years: 1917–1949
- Rank: Brigadier General
- Unit: Field Artillery Branch
- Commands: 191st Field Artillery Regiment; Fort Indiantown Gap; Fort Knox
- Conflicts: World War I: Battle of Saint-Mihiel; Battle of Blanc Mont Ridge; Meuse–Argonne offensive; World War II: Normandy Campaign; Battle of Cherbourg; Battle of Hürtgen Forest; Rhineland Campaign
- Awards: Silver Star (3); Legion of Merit; Bronze Star Medal (2); Purple Heart (2)

George Douglas Wahl (October 15, 1895 – March 24, 1981) was a highly decorated officer in the United States Army with the rank of Brigadier General. A veteran of both world wars, he distinguished himself as Artillery Commander and later as Assistant Division Commander, 79th Infantry Division (Cross of Lorraine) during Normandy and Rhineland Campaigns.

Following the War, he remained in the Army and served as Commanding general, Fort Indiantown Gap Separation and Discharge Center or Commander of Fort Knox.

== Early career ==
George D. Wahl was born on October 15, 1895, in New Orleans, Louisiana, as the son of future Major general Lutz Wahl and Emma Joubert. Following the high school. he received an appointment to the United States Military Academy at West Point, New York, from which he graduated, 21st in a class of 139, with Bachelor of Science degree on April 20, 1917, just few days after the United States entry into World War I.

Wahl's West Point class produced more than 55 future general officers, including two Army Chiefs of Staff – Joseph L. Collins and Matthew B. Ridgway. Other classmates include: Clare H. Armstrong, Aaron Bradshaw Jr., Mark W. Clark, John T. Cole, Norman D. Cota, John M. Devine, William W. Eagles, Theodore L. Futch, Charles H. Gerhardt, Augustus M. Gurney, Ernest N. Harmon, William Kelly Harrison Jr., Robert W. Hasbrouck, Frederick A. Irving, Laurence B. Keiser, Charles S. Kilburn, Bryant E. Moore, Daniel Noce, Onslow S. Rolfe, Herbert N. Schwarzkopf, Albert C. Smith, Raymond E. S. Williamson, and George H. Weems.

He was commissioned second lieutenant in Field Artillery Branch and attached to the 12th Field Artillery Regiment, 2nd Division. Wahl promptly reached the ranks of first lieutenant and captain and embarked for France in fall 1917. He participated in the battles of Saint-Mihiel, Blanc Mont Ridge and Argonne forest and received three Silver Star citations for bravery, Purple Heart for wounds and French Croix de guerre 1914–1918 with Guilt Star.

Following the Armistice, Wahl participated in the Rhineland occupation in Coblenz until July 1919, when he returned to the United States. He then served in various Field Artillery command and staff assignments, including postings to Fort Leavenworth, Kansas; Fort Bliss, Texas; and Fort Sill, Oklahoma. Wahl successfully completed the courses at the Army Command and General Staff (1930); Army Industrial College (1939), and the Naval War College (1940).

== World War II ==
Upon his graduation from the Naval War College, Wahl was promoted to lieutenant colonel on June 1, 1940, and ordered to the headquarters of Seventh Corps Area in Omaha, Nebraska, and served under Major general George V. Strong as Assistant chief of staff for operations (G-3) until November 1941. He then assumed command of 191st Field Artillery Regiment and was promoted to the temporary rank of Colonel on December 11, 1941, only four days after the Japanese attack on Pearl Harbor.

In February 1943, XV Corps was activated under Major general Wade H. Haislip at Camp Beauregard, Louisiana. Wahl was attached to the Corps Artillery Section under Brigadier general Edward S. Ott and appointed his executive officer.

Wahl was ordered to Camp Philips, Kansas, in February 1944 and succeeded his West Point Classmate, Augustus M. Gurney as Artillery Commanding officer of 79th Infantry Division (Cross of Lorraine) under Major general Ira T. Wyche. For his new billet, he was promoted to the temporary rank of Brigadier general on May 25, 1944.

He embarked for England in mid-April 1944 and participated in the intensive training, prior the Invasion of Normandy on June 6 that year. The 79th Division finally landed in France on D-Day+6 and participated as the part of Major general J. Lawton Collins' VII Corps in the Battle of Cherbourg and captured Fort du Roule.

Wahl commanded division's artillery during the rest of combats in the Northern France and participated in the Seine River Crossing at Mantes-Gassicourt, the first allied bridgehead across the Seine River in the aftermath of Operation Overlord, which allowed the Allies to engage in the Liberation of Paris. During the combats on the Siegfried Line in late 1944 and early 1945, Wahl assumed duty as Assistant Division Commander, 79th Infantry Division by the end of January 1945 and led Task Force Wahl, which consisted of the Third Battalion, of the 313th Infantry Regiment, the 315th Regiment, the 222nd Regiment, Combat Command A of the 14th Armored Division and the 827th Tank Destroyer Battalion.

He led his command during the defensive combats along the Moder until the beginning of February 1945 and during February and March 1945, the division mopped up German resistance, returned to offensive combat by the end of March that year, crossed the Rhine, drove across the Rhine-Herne Canal, April 7, secured the north bank of the Ruhr and took part in clearing the Ruhr Pocket until April 13, 1945.

Following the surrender of Nazi Germany in May 1945, 79th Division participated in the occupation duty in the area of Dortmund and later in Bavaria and Wahl was ordered back to the United States for new assignment in June 1945. For his service with 79th Infantry Division, he was recommended twice by Major general Ira T. Wyche for award of Army Distinguished Service Medal, but it was downgraded in both cases to Legion of Merit. He also received two Bronze Star Medals, another Purple Heart and was made Knight of the Legion of Honour and received Croix de Guerre 1939–1945 with Palm by the Government of France.

== Postwar service ==
Upon his return to the United States, Wahl assumed duty as Commanding general, Fort Indiantown Gap Separation and Discharge Center, where he was responsible for the demobilization site for many units returning home from the European Theater of Operations after the war ended until August 1945, when he was sent to the Fort Knox, Kentucky, for duty as Commanding general of that post.

Wahl was reverted to the peacetime rank of Colonel on February 28, 1946, and ordered to San Francisco, California, where he joined the headquarters of 9th Service Command under Major general William E. Shedd. After a four months in this capacity, Wahl was appointed a Senior Instructor to Oregon Officers Reserve Corps and remained in that assignment until May 1948, when he was appointed Deputy Commanding Officer Northern Military District under Major general Albert E. Brown.

== Retirement ==
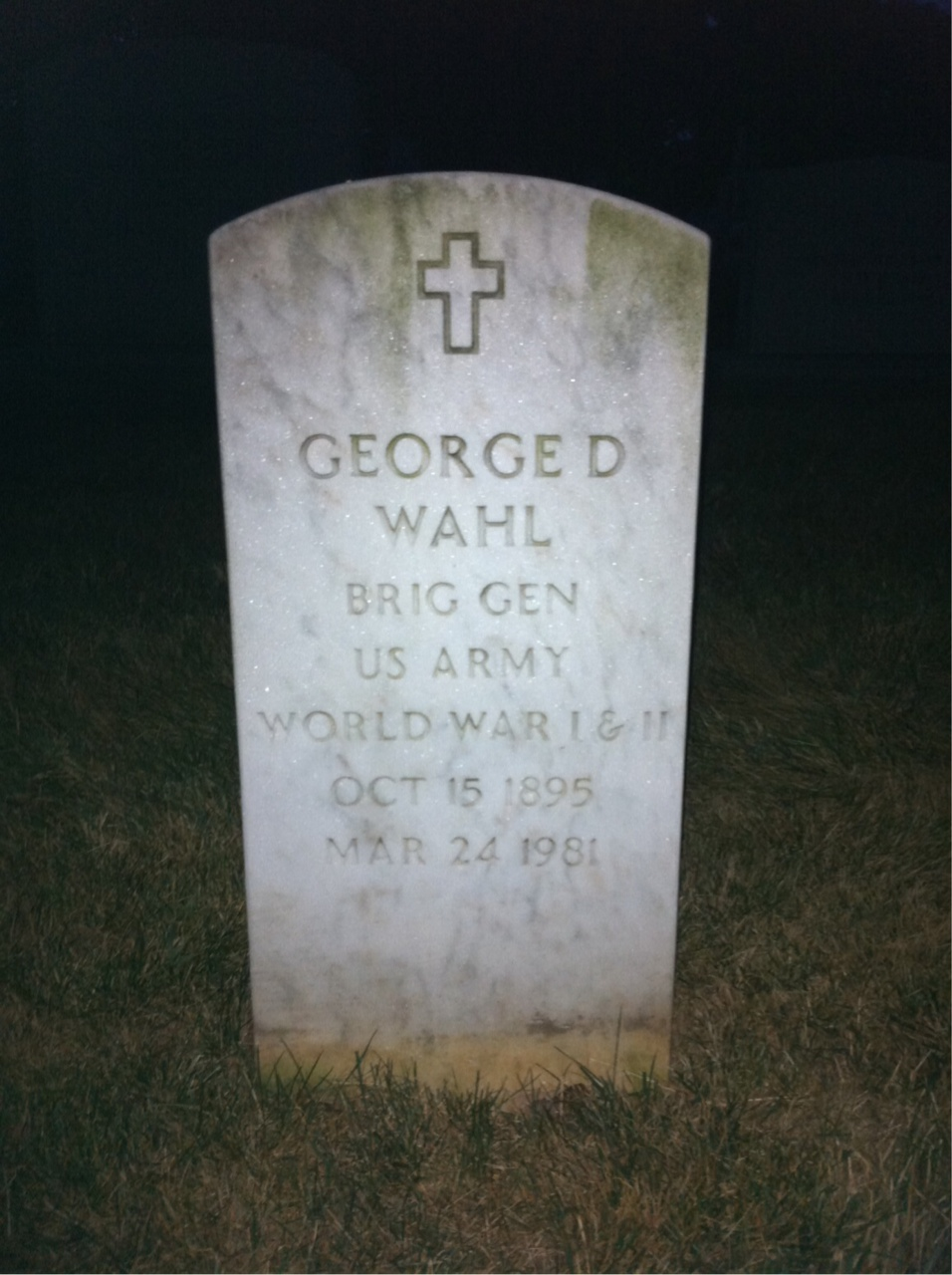
The grave of Brigadier General George Douglas Wahl at Arlington National Cemetery

Wahl retired from active duty on June 30, 1949, with his wartime rank of Brigadier general after 32 years of active service and settled in Carmel-by-the-Sea, California. He was active in the American Legion and died at his home in Carmel on March 24, 1981, aged 73. Wahl was buried with full military honors at Arlington National Cemetery, Virginia, beside his wife, Emma D. Wahl (1903–1975). They had together three children: two sons, Robert and John, and a daughter, Patricia.

== Decorations ==
Here is Brigadier general Wahl's ribbon bar:

1st Row	Silver Star with two Oak Leaf Clusters		Legion of Merit	
2nd Row	Bronze Star Medal with Oak Leaf Cluster	Purple Heart with Oak Leaf Cluster	World War I Victory Medal with three battle clasps	Army of Occupation of Germany Medal
3rd Row	American Defense Service Medal	American Campaign Medal	European-African-Middle Eastern Campaign Medal with four 3/16 inch service stars	World War II Victory Medal
4th Row	Army of Occupation Medal	Knight of the Legion of Honor (France)	French Croix de guerre 1914–1918 with Guilt Star	French Croix de guerre 1939-1945 with Palm
