= General Williamson =

General Williamson may refer to:

- Ellis W. Williamson (1918–2007), U.S. Army major general
- James Alexander Williamson (1829–1902), Union Army brigadier general
- Raymond E. S. Williamson (1894–1957), U.S. Army brigadier general
