= Augustus M. Gurney =

U.S. Army Brigadier General

Augustus Milton Gurney
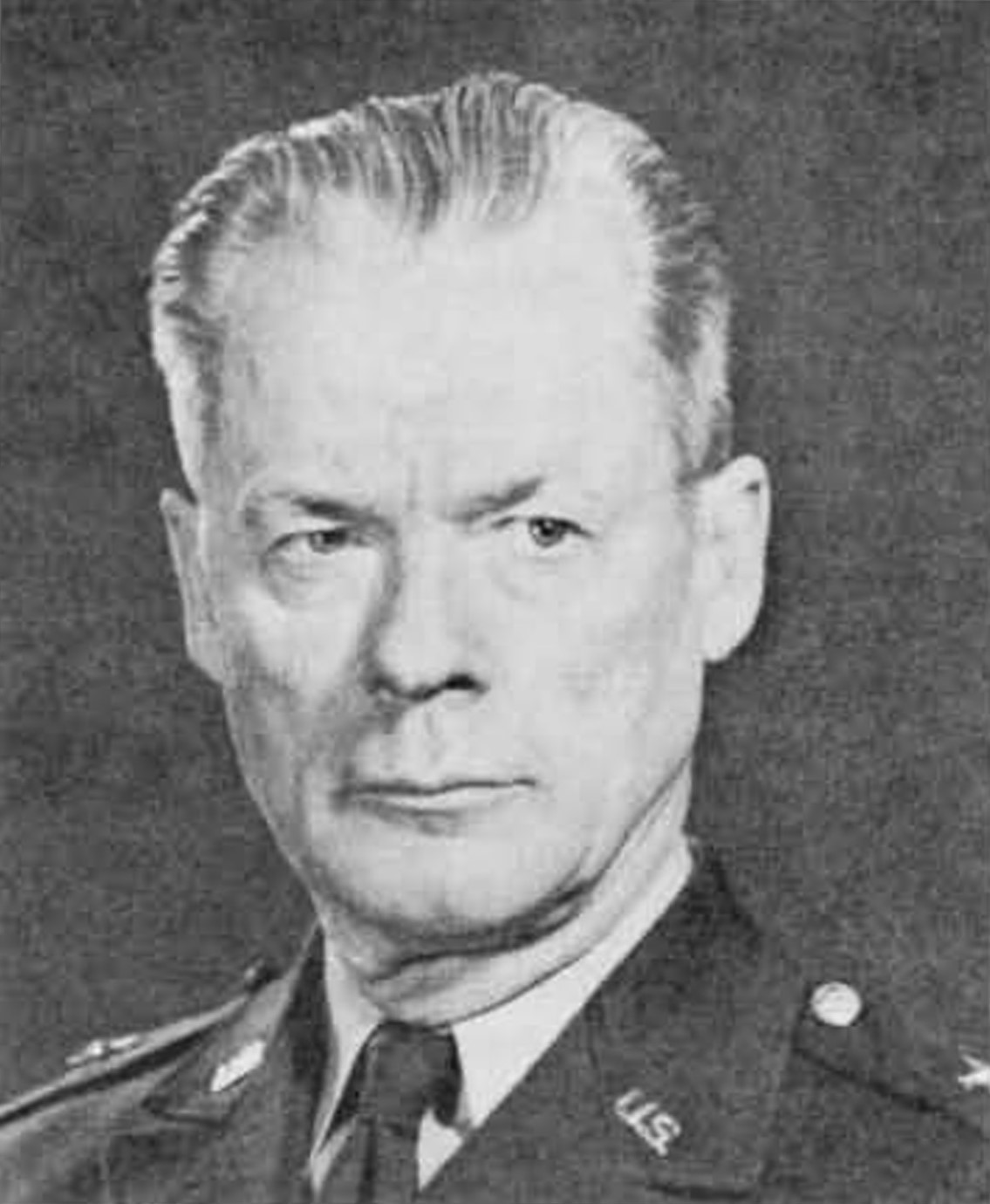
- Born: February 18, 1895; Oneonta, New York, US
- Died: April 10, 1967 (aged 72); Fort Bragg, North Carolina, US
- Military career
- Allegiance: United States
- Branch: United States Army
- Service years: 1917–1954
- Rank: Brigadier General
- Unit: Field Artillery Branch
- Conflicts: World War I; Meuse–Argonne offensive; World War II
- Awards: Legion of Merit

Augustus Milton Gurney (February 18, 1895 – April 10, 1967) was an officer in the United States Army with the rank of brigadier general during World War II. A graduate of the United States Military Academy, he served mostly in the staff positions and completed his career as Assistant Chief of Staff for Operations (G-3), First United States Army.

== Early career ==
Augustus M. Gurney was born on February 18, 1895, in Oneonta, New York, as the son of Louis C. Gurney and Florence Moody. He completed Stanton Preparatory Academy in Highland Falls, New York, and entered the United States Military Academy at West Point, New York, in June 1913. Graduating 27th in a class of 139 cadets, he was a member of the Class of 1917, which produced many future general officers including two Army Chiefs of Staff (Joseph L. Collins and Matthew Ridgway) as well as Mark W. Clark, a future full general, William Kelly Harrison Jr. and Daniel Noce, two lieutenant generals.

Gurney graduated with Bachelor of Science degree on April 20, 1917, shortly following the United States entry into World War I, and was commissioned second lieutenant in the Field Artillery Branch. He embarked for France as a member of 1st Field Artillery Brigade and served consecutively as Battery commander and as a balloon observer during Meuse–Argonne offensive.

Following a tour of occupation duty in the Rhineland, Gurney returned to the United States in mid-1919 and assumed duty as an instructor of mathematics at the United States Military Academy. He remained four years in this capacity and entered the instruction at Army Field Artillery School at Fort Sill, Oklahoma, in June 1923. Gurney graduated one year later and was ordered to the Army Signal School at Fort Monmouth, New Jersey.

In May 1925, Gurney entered the Yale University and graduated two years later with Master of Science degree. His schooling continued with two-years course at the Army Command and General Staff School at Fort Leavenworth, Kansas, and one-year instruction at Army War College in Washington, D.C., and later assumed duty as an instructor at the Army Command and General Staff School at Fort Leavenworth.

== World War II ==
Gurney was promoted to lieutenant colonel on June 1, 1940, and joined the headquarters, II Corps under Major General Henry C. Pratt and served as Assistant Chief of Staff for Intelligence until August 1941, when he was appointed Assistant Chief of Staff for Operations with II Corps. While in this capacity, Gurney was promoted to colonel on December 11, 1941, just four days after the Japanese attack on Pearl Harbor.

He was promoted to the temporary rank of brigadier general on April 16, 1942, and ordered to Camp Pickett, Virginia, where he joined the headquarters of 79th Infantry Division under Major General Ira T. Wyche. Gurney assumed duty as Artillery Commander of the division and participated in the Tennessee Maneuvers, after which it moved to Camp Laguna near Yuma, Arizona, where it trained in the desert. It was then ordered to Camp Phillips, Kansas for training in winter conditions, but before 79th Division deployed to the European Theater of Operations, Gurney was declared unfit for overseas duty and succeeded by his West Point Classmate, George D. Wahl in February 1944.

Gurney was then attached to the headquarters, Second United States Army under lieutenant general Lloyd Fredendall in Memphis, Tennessee, and served in this capacity until June 1944, when he was appointed chief of staff under Fredendall. He was co-responsible for the training of replacements for the units going overseas and received the Legion of Merit for his service.

== Postwar service ==
Gurney remained in the Army following the War and assumed duty as Commanding General, Camp Earle, Alaska in October 1945. He remained in this capacity until January 1946, when he assumed command of Adak Army Base, Alaska. Gurney was reverted to the peacetime rank of colonel on April 30, 1946, and remained in Adak until the end of March 1947.

He was subsequently ordered to Washington, D.C., and attached to Plans Section, Office of the Chief of Army Field Forces under General Jacob L. Devers. Gurney was attached to the headquarters, First United States Army in New York City and served as Assistant Chief of Staff for Operation (G-3) consecutively under lieutenant generals Willis D. Crittenberger and Withers A. Burress.

== Retirement ==
Gurney retired with his wartime rank of brigadier general in early 1954 for physical disability and settled in his native Oneonta, where he was active in civic duties. He later moved to Southern Pines, North Carolina, where he lived until his death. Brigadier general Augustus M. Gurney died on April 10, 1967, at Womack Army Medical Center at Fort Bragg, North Carolina, and was buried at Glenwood Cemetery in Oneonta.

He was married in 1919 to Dora Bonbright of New York City, who died in 1944. Their two daughters, Margaret (Peg) Gurney and Louise Gurney Ferrell survive him. In 1946 he married Gladys Kirton of Aynor, South Carolina, who survives him at Southern Pines, North Carolina.

== Decorations ==
Here is Brigadier general Gurney's ribbon bar:

1st Row	Legion of Merit		
2nd Row	World War I Victory Medal with two battle clasps	Army of Occupation of Germany Medal	American Defense Service Medal
3rd Row	American Campaign Medal	World War II Victory Medal	National Defense Service Medal
