= Combat command =

Military organization/formation

A combat command was a combined-arms military organization of comparable size to a brigade or regiment employed by armored forces of the United States Army from 1942 until 1963. The structure of combat commands was task-organized and so the forces assigned to a combat command often varied from mission to mission.

== Abbreviations ==
Combat command is most often abbreviated by one of the related derivative notations:

- CCA, or CC-A or CC A
- CCB, or CC-B or CC B
- CCC, or CC-C or CC C (an older convention for "reserve formation")
- CCR, or CC-R or CC R (for Combat Command Reserve)

== History ==
The concept of the combat command was developed by General Adna Chaffee during the 1930s. Chaffee's concept envisaged combined arms mechanized units with no formal structure. When the first U.S. armored divisions were organized a few years later, Chaffee's concepts for the combat command were incorporated into the divisional structure.

The combat command was a flexible organization that did not have dedicated battalions. Instead, tank, armored infantry, and armored field artillery battalions, as well as smaller units of tank destroyers, engineers, and mechanized cavalry were assigned as needed in order to accomplish any given mission. During a U.S. Army reorganization in the 1960s, the term combat command fell out of favor and was replaced by the designation brigade.

While flexible, this task-force organization lacked the high cohesion characteristic of traditional regiments that always kept the same group of battalions together. The organization of the combat command contrasted with that of the infantry, who employed reinforced infantry regiments with permanently assigned infantry battalions. This type of infantry organization was called a regimental combat team.

Use of combat commands was first specified in Armored Force Tentative Table of Organization A, for armored divisions, dated December 22, 1941. The initial organization envisioned two combat command headquarters at the disposal of the armored division. The combat command headquarters themselves were small, fielding only five light tanks and 56 men. Revisions to this structure in 1943 resulted in a headquarters of three light tanks and 99 men. The 1943 structure also allowed for three combat command headquarters in an armored division.

Within the armored division, the combat commands were named "A", "B", and later, "R" (for Reserve). (Note: "While still at Camp Cooke the division also started developing the combat command type of tactical headquarters. CC A was first commanded by Brig. Gen. Wood and later, by Brig. Gen. Harold W. Blakely, CC B's first commander was Brig. Gen. Serene E. Brett. CC A's tactical units included: the 34th Armored Regiment, 71st Armored Field Artillery Battalion, and the 1st Battalion of the 46th Armored Infantry Regiment. CC B's organization consisted of: the 81st Armored Regiment, 47th Armored Field Artillery Battalion, and the 2nd Battalion of the 46th. The remainder of the units formed what was known as the Division Reserve.") Thus, historical accounts of U.S. armored divisions of this period refer to "Combat Command B" or "CCB" and so forth. During the latter stages of World War II in Europe, armored divisions tended to fight with CCA and CCB, while moving worn-out battalions into CCR for rest and refit, though this was not always the case. (Note: Some armored used CCR as an operational combat element of the division as well, such as the 7th Armored Division's use of CCR during the reduction of the Ruhr Pocket and the 12th Armored Division's CCR spearhead outpacing CCA and CCR in the XXI Corps' dash for Austria in the final weeks of the war. The 5th Armored Division used CCR as a combat element during the entire campaign in northwestern Europe. (See for details, particularly the biography section for Colonel Glen H. Anderson, the CCR commander.)) In 1954, CCR was redesignated "Combat Command C" (CCC).

The combat command proved to be the forerunner of modern U.S. Army organizational structure for divisions. In the early 1960s, divisions were restructured as part of the Reorganization Objective Army Division (ROAD), in which all divisions, including infantry, were organized with three brigades which also did not have dedicated battalions and could be assigned as many battalions as needed for a mission. With the transition to ROAD divisions, the term combat command was no longer employed by the U.S. Army.
