= John T. Cole =

United States Army general (1895–1975)

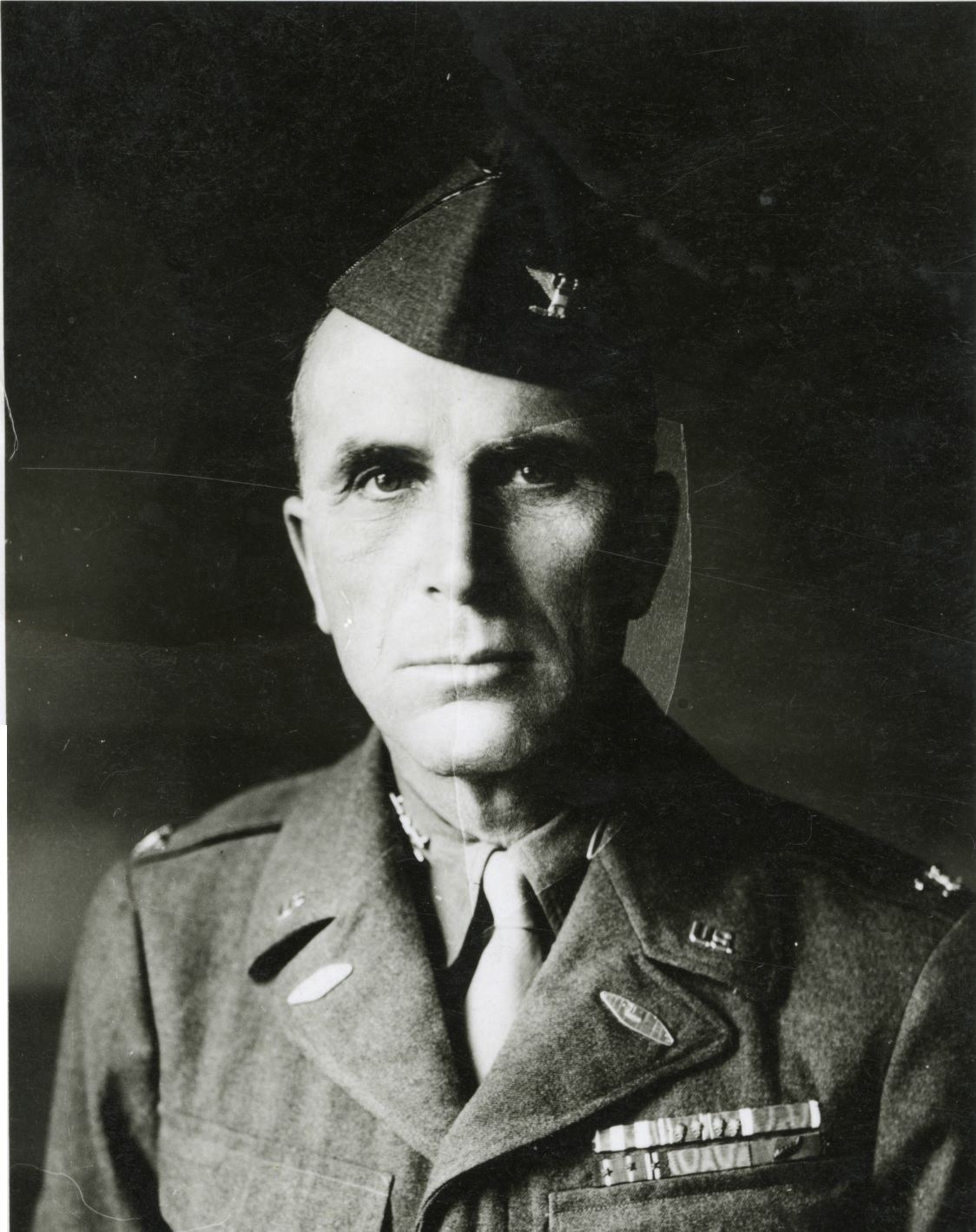
- Official portrait, 1944
- Born: John Tupper Cole; July 23, 1895; West Point, New York, U.S.
- Died: April 24, 1975 (aged 79); Denville, New Jersey, U.S.
- Burial place: Arlington National Cemetery
- Military career
- Allegiance: United States
- Branch: United States Army
- Service years: 1917–1953
- Rank: Brigadier General
- Unit: Cavalry Branch
- Commands: 3rd Armored Division; 2nd Cavalry Regiment
- Conflicts: World War I: Meuse-Argonne Offensive; World War II: Invasion of Normandy; Rhineland Campaign; Central European Campaign; Korean War
- Awards: Silver Star; Legion of Merit; Bronze Star Medal (5); Purple Heart

John Tupper Cole (July 23, 1895 – April 24, 1975) was a highly decorated officer in the United States Army with the rank of Brigadier General. A graduate of the United States Military Academy and veteran of both World Wars, he is most noted for his service as Colonel and Commanding officer, Combat Command B, 5th Armored Division during combats on the Western Front.

Following the War, he remained in the Army and rose to the rank of Brigadier general and served as Chief, United States Military Assistance Advisory Group in Thailand during the Korean War and completed his career as Acting commanding general, 3rd Armored Division.

== Early years ==
John Tupper Cole was born on July 23, 1895, at West Point, New York as the son of Cavalry Colonel James A. Cole and Marry Tupper, daughter of Major Tullius Tupper, also a Cavalryman and West Point graduate. Following high school, John followed his father's footsteps and received an appointment to the United States Military Academy at West Point, New York in the summer of 1913. During his time at the academy, he captained the basketball team and was also active on the football team.

Cole graduated 47th in a class of 139 with a Bachelor of Science degree on April 20, 1917, exactly two weeks following the American entry into World War I, and was commissioned a second lieutenant in the Cavalry Branch. He completed his basic training at Fort Sam Houston, Texas, while attached to 3rd Cavalry Regiment and embarked for France. His regiment was tasked with the operation of three major horse remount depots. The three squadrons were charged with the purchase of horses, mules and forage, the care, conditioning, and training of remounts before issue, and the distribution and issue of remounts to the American Expeditionary Forces.

He was later consecutively promoted to first lieutenant and Captain and participated in the support operations of the Meuse–Argonne offensive in late 1918. Following the Armistice, Cole was transferred to the Tank Corps (United States) and appointed an instructor at the Tank School at Bourg. During his service with the Tank Corps in World War I, he met and befriended George S. Patton.

== Interwar period ==
Following his return to the United States, he served with 3rd Cavalry until summer 1922, when he entered the Troop Officers' Course at Army Cavalry School at Fort Riley, Kansas and graduated one year later. Cole then rejoined 3rd Cavalry for a brief period, but subsequently was ordered to the United States Military Academy at West Point, New York as Tactical officer and Instructor in equitation.

Cole spent four years in this capacity and returned to the Army Cavalry School at Fort Riley, Kansas in May 1929 for Troop Officers' advanced course, which he completed in June 1929. He then entered the Cavalry School Advanced Equitation Course, which he completed in May 1930.

He then joined the Army Horse Show Team and the U. S. Olympic Equestrian Team and was reserve rider during the 1932 Summer Olympics. Captain Cole remained with the Equestrian teams until 1934 and joined 7th Cavalry Regiment as Commander of the 2nd Squadron. He was garrisoned with that unit at Fort Bliss, Texas until June 1937, when he entered the Army Command and General Staff School at Fort Leavenworth, Kansas and graduated one year later.

Upon the graduation, he was assigned to the 2nd Cavalry Regiment at Fort Riley, Kansas and served as Regimental Executive Officer until April 1941, when he succeeded another brilliant equestrian, Harry Chamberlin in command of the regiment. Cole was promoted to the rank of Colonel at that time.

== World War II ==
Following the United States entry into World War II, Cole was transferred to the Armored Force in July 1942 and assigned to the 5th Armored Division that October. He later assumed command of 81st Armor Regiment and remained in command of that outfit until September 1943, when he was ordered to Pine Camp, New York to rejoin the 5th Armored Division.

Cole was subsequently appointed Commanding officer, Combat Command B, a combined brigade size unit of tanks, armored infantry, armored field artillery battalions and engineer units. He embarked with the division for France in June 1944 and landed on Utah Beach on July 24. He led his unit during the last phase of Invasion of Normandy and Combat Command B participated in the combats near Argentan and Dreux.

The Combat Command B (CCB) cleared the enemy between the Eure and Seine Rivers and streaked north through the Compiegne Forest to the Belgian border at Conde. Following a fighting in Luxembourg, Cole's troops were the first Allied units to cross the German border, when a small patrol from Troop B, 85th Cavalry Reconnaissance Squadron crossed the Our River boundary at Stalzemburg at on September 11, 1944.

Cole then led the CCB during the fighting in the pillbox area beyond Wallendorf in order to draw large German forces from the Aachen area. The CCB then capture the city of Rheindahlen in February 1945 and stopped at the Elbe river on April 13, 1945. During that period, CCB participated in the total destruction of Panzer Division Clausewitz.

For his leadership of Combat Command B throughout the War, Cole was decorated Silver Star, Legion of Merit, five Bronze Star Medals and Purple Heart for wounds sustained in combat. The Allies awarded him with several decorations including Legion of Honor, French Croix de guerre 1939-1945 with Palm, Belgian Croix de Guerre or Luxembourg War Cross (see below for complete list).

== Postwar career ==
After a period of occupation duty in Germany, Tupper returned to the United States and became Chief of Staff, later interim Commanding Officer of the Military District of Washington (as a colonel). While in this capacity, he was responsible for the defense of National Capital Region including The Pentagon and for the ceremonial tasks of the district.

Cole was promoted to the rank of Brigadier general in mid-1950 and appointed U.S. member to the Security Council of the United Nations. In September that year, he was ordered to Bangkok, Thailand and tasked with the organization of the United States Military Assistance Advisory Group. Cole served as the Chief of Advisory Group during the Korean War and helped to train the Thai Armed Forces for combat deployment. He also served as an observer of Thai troops in Korea. For his part in this assignment, Cole was decorated with the Order of the White Elephant by the Government of Thailand.

He later returned to the United States and served as Assistant Division Commander, 3rd Armored Division, which was tasked with the training of replacement tank units during Korean War. Cole also served as Acting division commander from November to December 1952 and retired in mid-1953.

== Retirement ==
Following his retirement from the Army after almost 36 years, Cole settled in Huntington Bay, New York, where he built a house. He was nomited for Supervisor of Huntington Township by the United Citizens Party and was active in the United States Armor Association and enjoyed Golf. Cole later served as Director of the National Horse Show and was decorated from the Swedish Government for his work in connection with the equestrian Olympic events in Stockholm in 1956.

Brigadier general John T. Cole died on April 24, 1975, aged 79, in Denville, New Jersey and was buried with full military honors at Arlington National Cemetery, Virginia. His wife Janet MacKay Cole is buried beside him. They had together a son and a daughter.

== Decorations ==
Here is Brigadier general Cole's ribbon bar:

1st Row	Silver Star		Legion of Merit	
2nd Row	Bronze Star Medal with Four Oak Leaf Clusters	Army Commendation Medal	Purple Heart	World War I Victory Medal with two Battle Clasps
3rd Row	American Defense Service Medal	American Campaign Medal	European-African-Middle Eastern Campaign Medal with four 3/16 inch service stars	World War II Victory Medal
4th Row	Army of Occupation Medal	National Defense Service Medal	Korean Service Medal	Knight of the Legion of Honor (France)
5th Row	French Croix de guerre 1939-1945 with Palm	Officer of the Order of Leopold (Belgium)	Belgian Croix de Guerre with Palm	Officer of the Order of Adolphe of Nassau (Luxembourg)
6th Row	Luxembourg War Cross	Knight of the Order of Orange-Nassau (the Netherlands)	Knight Commander of the Order of the White Elephant (Thailand)	United Nations Korea Medal

== See also ==
- 3rd Armored Division (United States)

Military offices
Preceded by Raymond E. S. Williamson	Commanding General, 3rd Armored Division; November 1952 – December 1952	Succeeded by Richard W. Stevens
