= 81st Armor Regiment =

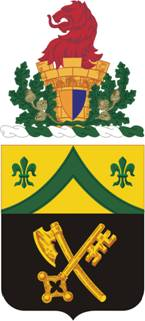
- Coat of arms
- Active: 1941 – present
- Country: United States
- Branch: Armor Branch (United States)
- Type: Armor
- Role: Armored warfare & armor maintenance training
- Garrison/HQ: Fort Benning, GA
- Nickname: "Red Knights"
- Motto: Supero Omnia (Above All)
- Colors: Gold, Black and Green
- Engagements: World War II

Commanders
- Notable commanders: John T. Cole

The 81st Armor Regiment currently has two active battalions, the 1st and 3rd. The 1st Battalion is assigned to the 194th Armor Brigade, Fort Benning, GA. Responsible for training enlisted Armor Crewmen and Armor Maintainers for the US Army and US Marines on armored warfare vehicles such as the M1 Abrams Main Battle Tank, and the M2 Bradley Fighting Vehicle platform. The 3rd Battalion is assigned to the 199th Infantry Brigade and is currently the Provost battalion for the Maneuver Center of Excellence, Fort Benning, GA.

== History and lineage of 1st Battalion and Regiment ==
The 81st Armored Regiment (Medium) was activated on 1 October 1941 at Fort Knox, Kentucky, and assigned to the 5th Armored Division. It was subsequently redesignated as the 81st Armored Regiment on 1 January 1942 and moved to Camp Cooke, California on 16 February 1942 and to the California Maneuver Area on 14 August 1942. It returned to Camp Cooke on 19 November 1942 and moved to the Tennessee Maneuver Area on 24 March 1943. The 81st arrived at Pine Camp, New York, on 24 June 1943 where it was redesignated (less 3d Battalion, Maintenance Company, Service Company and Reconnaissance Company) as the 81st Tank Battalion on 20 September 1943. The 3d Battalion and Reconnaissance Company were redesignated at the 707th Tank Battalion (a unit of the 7th Armored Division) and Troop E, 85th Cavalry Reconnaissance Squadron, respectively. The remainder of the unit was disbanded.

The 81st Tank Battalion left the New York Port of Embarkation (NYPE) on 11 February 1944 and arrived in England on 23 February 1944, and then in France on 25 July 1944. Its August 1945 location was Bleicherode, Germany. It returned to the US at the Boston Port of Embarkation on 7 October 1945. The 81st earned the following campaign credits:

- Normandy, 6 June 1944 – 24 July 1944
- Northern France, 25 July 1944 – 14 September 1944
- Rhineland, 15 September 1944 – 21 March 1945
- Central Europe, 22 March 1945 – 11 May 1945
- Ardennes-Alsace, 12 December 1944 – 25 January 1945

Source: U.S. Army Order of Battle: World War II by Shelby L. Stanton

Combat Service Shortly after its service in California, the 81st Tank Battalion headed to Europe in July 1944 to participate in the battles for Normandy and Northern France. The unit was successful in liberating Luxembourg City on 10 September 1944. As December 1944 crept closer, the battalion entered the Huertgen Forest in the Alsace Region of France. The battalion then rested and refitted for the final push into Germany. The unit spearheaded the 5th Armored Division's drive to the Rhine River and became the first unit to cross the Siegfried Line into the Rhineland, crossing the Rhine in March 1945. It then drove to the Elbe, 45 miles from Berlin, and was engaged in mopping up German resistance in the Ninth Army sector.

Post-World War II Upon returning from the battlefields of Europe, the battalion was inactivated in the fall of 1945. Except for seven months in 1950, it was active from 1948 to 1956 with the 5th Armored Division at Fort Chaffee, Arkansas, where it served as a training unit. In 1962, the 81st and the 94th Tank Battalions and the 505th Replacement Company were redesignated as the 81st Armor Regiment under the Combat Arms Regimental System, and in February of that year, the 1st and 2nd Battalions were assigned to the 1st Armored Division in the United States. In 1971, both units were inactivated when the 1st AD was moved to Germany. In 1972, the 1st Battalion, 81st Armor was reactivated in Erlangen, West Germany as part of 2nd Brigade, 1st Armored Division, where it remained until 1990, when it deployed to Kuwait as part of Operations Desert Shield and Desert Storm. In January 1996, the unit was reassigned to Fort Knox, KY as a part of the 1st Armored Training Brigade.

== History of 2nd Battalion ==
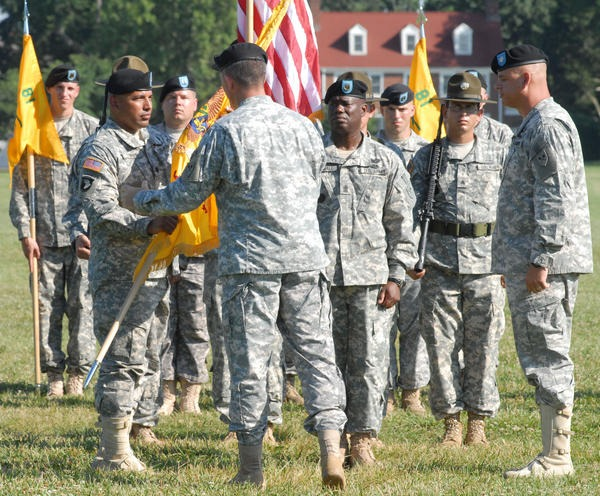
Ceremony, the 2nd Battalion 81st Armor Regiment, cased its color.

In a ceremony held Tuesday on Brooks Field, the 2nd Battalion, 81st Armor Regiment cased its colors, then immediately uncased the colors of—and re-designated itself as—the 1st Battalion, 81st Armor Regiment. Following the uncasing of the 1-81 colors, Lt. Col. Larry Reeves relinquished his command of the armor regiment to Lt. Col. Darrell Green.

Col. David Thompson, the commander of the 194th Armored Brigade, welcomed the crowd.

“Thank you for being with us on this glorious day as we mark yet another change in our Army. Today we’ve witnessed the change of command between two great Soldiers,” he said.  “The unit, now the 1st Battalion, 81st Armor Regiment, bids farewell to Larry and Christie Reeves and family, while welcoming Darrell and Jeanne Green and their family.
“At the head of this formation for two years, Reeves imparted his outstanding command style and no-nonsense approach to training, influenced by his combat experience and driven by an exceptional work ethic,” Thompson said, then addressed the Reeves directly.
“I believe you are uniquely prepared for the important duties before you as the chief, Armor Enlisted Branch at the Human Resources Command.”

Thompson then directed his attention to the incoming commander.

“Lt. Col. Green is no stranger to the brigade, or this battalion. (He) establishes his presence wherever he goes—a presence defined by exceptional competence, leading from the front, setting the standard, and great team play. He knows how to train, what’s important and when, and he has my utmost confidence.”

Reeves then took the podium.

“As I look back on the last two years, I am awed by what the Red Knights accomplished. However, little of it was me. Thus, I’ve got a bunch of people to thank, so please bear with me,” said Reeves.  “A little over two years ago, I asked the Lord for strength, compassion, and wisdom as I took command of this formation. I’d like to publicly thank God for carrying me for the last two years, because I could not have made it without Him.”

He went on to thank former post commanders Maj. Gen. Donald Campbell and Maj. Gen. James Milano, Command Sgts. Maj. John Troxell and Ricky Young, Garrison Commander Col. Rick Schwartz, and a long list of others who supported Reeves during his command.

“Near and dear to my heart are the Red Knights standing before you. Our mission of training the Army’s newest tankers is one we take with pride and a little chip on our shoulder. As the only battalion that trains men specifically to be the offensive punch to any maneuver formation, it takes a special person to want to crew (a 70 ton beast),”he said.

Reeves then thanked the squadron’s drill sergeants, the tank instructors, his “austere” staff, the company command teams, and Command Sgt. Maj. Derek Cornwall.

“I was blessed to have the best NCO I’ve ever served with as my (command sergeant major),” he said.

Before concluding Reeves also gave special thanks to his wife and family, then addressed the troops on the field.

“You are getting a great command team in Darrell and Jeanne Green. He is the right man at the right time to take you to greater heights—to include Fort Benning. Darrell, I know you will make the impossible seem easy and you will be a great commander. Red Knights, you are the single point of success for our armored force—continue to rock the free world.
“Battle hard, Red Knights, to surpass all,” said Reeves. “This is Red Knight 6. Nothing further, out.”

Reeves stopped to hug Green and shake his hand as Green prepared to address the audience. Green served as the battalion operations officer for 2-81 Armor in 2007, and as the 194th Armored Brigade's operations officer in 2008. One year later, on May 6, 2009, he assumed the duties of deputy commander for the 194th.

“I take the responsibilities of command with great pride and commitment; acknowledging the fact command is truly a privilege and not a right,” said Green. “Upon arriving at Fort Knox three years ago, I was initially assigned to 2-81 Armor and am honored to be returning to the Red Knight Battalion today. To the Soldiers and civilian team members of 1-81 Armor, Jeanne and I look forward to serving with you over the next two years.
“Finally, I would like to thank (Reeves) and the tremendously talented battalion and post staffs for a great transition.”[4]

== History and lineage of 3rd Battalion ==
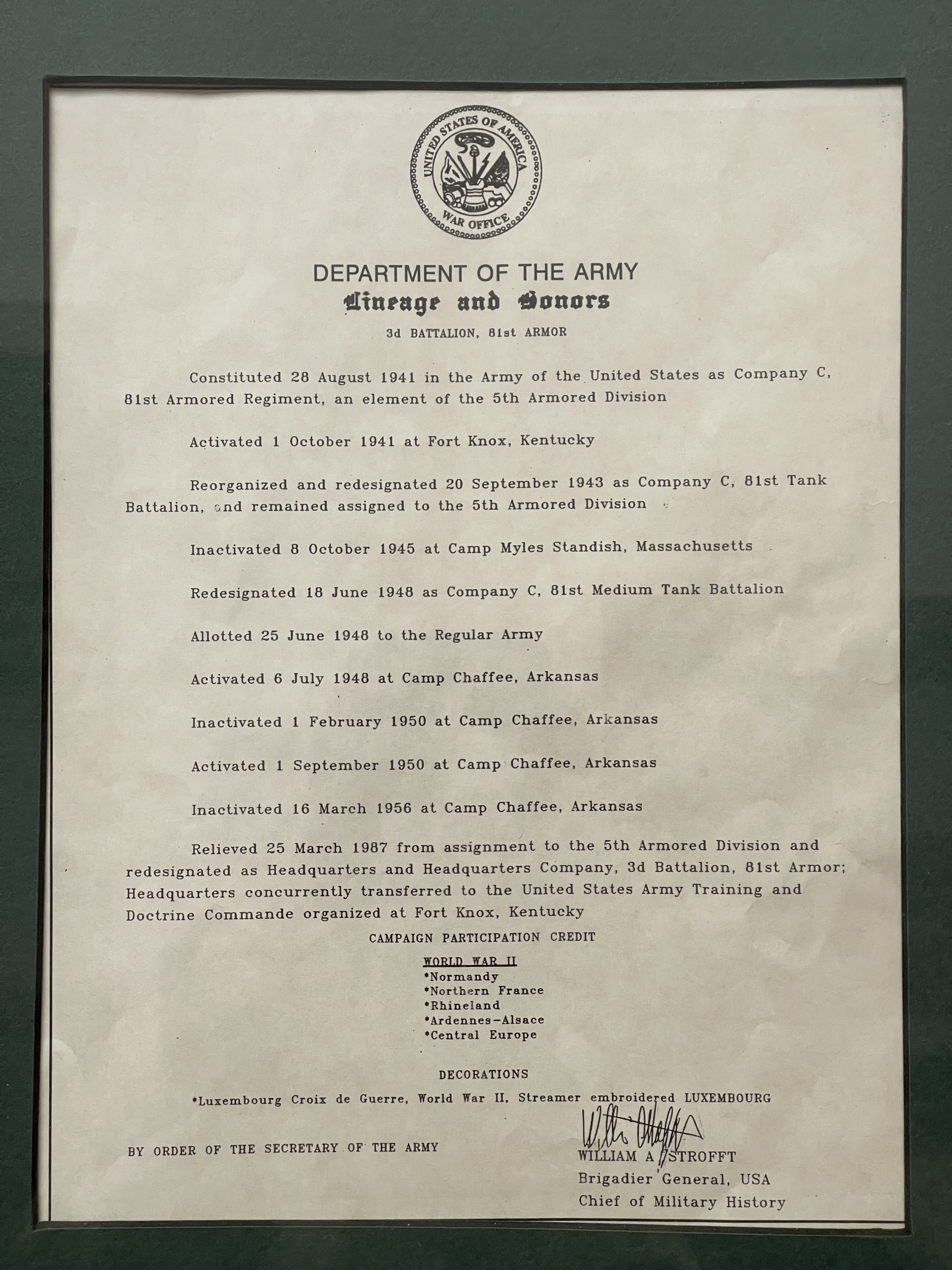
Lineage and Honors

The "Royal Lions" have performed a number of varied and challenging missions over the decades. The battalion was constituted on 28 August 1941, as Company C, 81st Armor Regiment and activated at Fort Knox, Kentucky, on 1 October of that year. Following America's entry into the Second World War, on 20 September 1943, the battalion was re-designated as the 707th Tank Battalion, where it saw combat as part of both the 5th and 7th Armored Divisions. As part of the drive through Europe the 707th participated in the campaigns of Normandy, Northern France, Rhineland, Ardennes-Alsace, and Central Europe. The 707th was awarded the Luxembourg Croix de Guerre, World War II streamer, for its outstanding wartime service. Following its successful campaigns in Europe the 707th was inactivated at Boston, Massachusetts, on 8 October 1945.

In the early months of the Korean War the battalion was re-designated as the 94th Medium Tank Battalion, 7th Armored Division and reactivated again on 24 November 1950, at Camp Roberts, California, where it remained until inactivated on 15 November 1953.

On 3 February 1962, the battalion was relieved from assignment to the 7th Armored Division and re-designated as the 3d battalion, 81st Armored Regiment under the Combat Arms Regimental System. The battalion was reassigned to the 5th Armored Division. On 25 March 1987, the battalion was relieved from assignment to the 5th Armored Division and re-designated at Fort Knox, Kentucky as a training battalion. On 1 October 1991, the battalion was again deactivated.

The current mission of the battalion begins with the creation, on 20 July 1965, of Committee Group. This unit was activated at Fort Knox with the mission of providing training support to Initial Entry Training soldiers. On 2 March 1986, Committee Group was re-designated as Training Group, the battalion was placed under the operational control of the 4th Training Brigade. On 30 July 1993, Training Group was re-designated 3d Battalion, 81st Armored Regiment and attached to the 1st Armor Training Brigade.

On 15 September 1997, the battalion accepted the attachment of the 233d Transportation Company (FORSCOM) from the 19th Engineer Battalion.

From 1 June 2004 through 30 April 2006 the battalion also had 3 Cavalry OSUT Troops attached: Golf, Hotel and India Troops from 6th Squadron, 15th Cavalry.

From 2007 to 2008, the battalion oversaw 19D OSUT training with the addition of two Cavalry Troops, India and Lima Troops, from 5th Squadron, 15th Cavalry.

On 2 June 2010, the battalion assumed command and control of Delta Company, Echo Company and the Ordnance Training Detachment thereby assuming the mission of advanced individual training for 91A and 91M and Marine Corps armor instructors.

On 1 OCT 2014 the BN was re-missioned under the 199th INF BDE during the MCOE re-organization to serve as the Army's very first PROVOST BN. A CO departed to 316 CAV, OTD, E CO, and the Marines were moved to 1-81AR, and C CO became a part of 194th AR BDE. The new Battalion formed from THE MCOE Band, B CO 3-81 AR missioned to oversee the Maneuver Captain Career Course, P TRP 316 CAV with the IMSO mission, and HHC MCoE.

In its many forms and under various designations, 3d Battalion, 81st Armored Regiment has a long and proud history of service to our Army in time of peace and war.

== Distinctive unit insignia ==
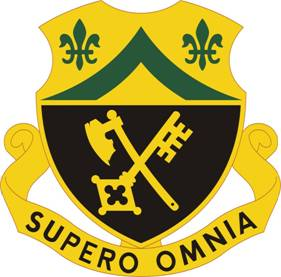

- Description

A Gold color metal and enamel device 1 1/8 inches (2.9 cm) in height overall consisting of a shield blazoned: Per fess enhanced Or and Sable, a chevron in point embowed between two fleurs-de-lis Vert and in base a battle-axe and key in saltire of the first. Attached below and to the sides of the shield is a Gold scroll inscribed "SUPERO OMNIA" in Black letters.

- Symbolism

The gold of the shield is the color for Armor. The fleurs-de-lis symbolize the organization's Normandy and Northern France campaigns. The chevron "in point embowed" recalls the Battle of the Bulge, the Ardennes-Alsace campaign. The key, occurring frequently in the civic arms of the towns of Rheinprovinz (the province in which the Rhine River crossing was made and the Siegfried line breached), symbolizes the Rhineland campaign. Symbolical of the important successes of this campaign, it allegorically represents the "Key to Victory" in Europe. The battle-axe, a favorite Teutonic weapon and heraldic charge throughout the entire medieval period, signifies the Central Europe campaign.

- Background

The distinctive unit insignia was originally approved for the 81st Medium Tank Battalion on 18 April 1953. It was amended to correct the spelling of the Latin motto on 19 April 1954. The insignia was redesignated for the 81st Armor Regiment on 31 January 1962.

== Coat of arms ==
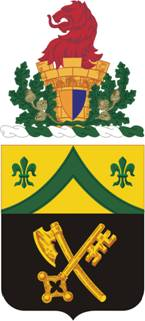

=== Blazon ===
- Shield

Per fess enhanced Or and Sable, in chief a chevron in point embowed between two fleurs-de-lis Vert and in base a battle-axe and key in saltire of the first. Crest On a wreath Argent and Vert between two branches of oak Proper a tower Or charged with an escutcheon per pale Tenné and Azure and surmounted with a lion's head erased Gules. Motto SUPERO OMNIA (To Surpass All).

=== Symbolism ===
- Shield

The gold of the shield is the color for Armor. The fleurs-de-lis symbolize the organization's Normandy and Northern France campaigns. The chevron "in point embowed" recalls the Battle of the Bulge, the Ardennes-Alsace campaign. The key, occurring frequently in the civic arms of the towns of Rheinprovinz (the province in which the Rhine River crossing was made and the Siegfried line breached), symbolizes the Rhineland campaign. Symbolical of the important successes of this campaign, it allegorically represents the "Key to Victory" in Europe. The battle-axe, a favorite Teutonic weapon and heraldic charge throughout the entire medieval period, signifies the Central Europe campaign.

- Crest

The red lion's head is adapted from the Arms of the Duchy of Luxembourg and the gold tower alludes to the successful accomplishment of the unit's mission in that area in World War II. The oak leaves symbolize honor, victory and valor and the shield, in the colors of the Luxembourg Croix de Guerre, alludes to the award of that decoration to the 81st Armor.

=== Background ===
The coat of arms was originally approved for the 81st Medium Tank Battalion on 18 April 1953. It was amended to correct the spelling of the Latin motto on 19 April 1954. It was redesignated for the 81st Armor Regiment on 31 January 1962. The insignia was amended to add a crest on 25 November 1964. It was amended to correct the wording in the blazon of the crest on 29 October 1965.
