= Robert W. Hasbrouck =

American general (1896–1985)

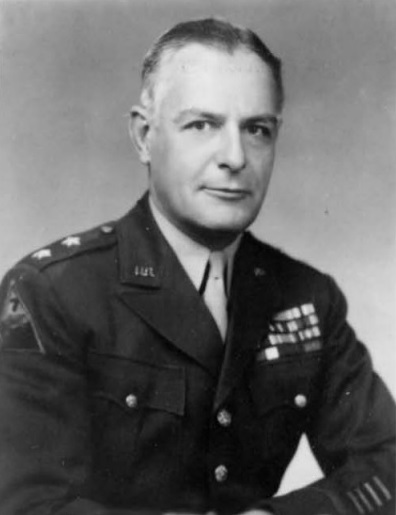
- From 1950's 7th Armd Division's Part in Reduction of the Ruhr Pocket
- Born: February 2, 1896; Kingston, New York, U.S.
- Died: August 19, 1985 (aged 89); Washington, D.C., U.S.
- Burial place: West Point Cemetery
- Spouse: Marjorie Nightingale (m. 1932-1985, his death)
- Children: 2
- Military career
- Allegiance: United States
- Branch: United States Army
- Service years: 1917–1947
- Rank: Major General
- Service number: 0-8588
- Units: U.S. Army Coast Artillery Corps; U.S. Army Field Artillery Branch
- Commands: 22nd Armored Artillery Battalion; Combat Command B, 8th Armored Division; Combat Command B, 7th Armored Division; 7th Armored Division
- Conflicts: World War I World War II
- Awards: Army Distinguished Service Medal; Silver Star; Legion of Merit; Bronze Star Medal with "V" device for valor
- Other work: Military Advisor, Hoover Commission; Chairman of the Board, Federal Financial Services Corporation

Robert W. Hasbrouck (February 2, 1896 – August 19, 1985) was a career officer in the United States Army. He attained the rank of major general and was a recipient of numerous awards and decorations, including the Army Distinguished Service Medal, Silver Star, Legion of Merit, and Bronze Star Medal with "V" device for valor. Hasbrouck was a veteran of World War I and World War II, and was most notable for his Second World War command of the 7th Armored Division.

== Early life ==
Robert Wilson Hasbrouck was born in Kingston, New York on February 2, 1896, the son of Jansen Hasbrouck and Cornelia (Wilson) Hasbrouck. He attended the public schools of Kingston, and was a graduate of Kingston Academy. In July 1913, U.S. Representative George McClellan appointed Hasbrouck to the United States Military Academy. He began attendance as a member of the class of 1918, which graduated in August 1917 because of the demand for trained officers as the United States Army expanded in anticipation of U.S. entry into World War I. Hasbrouck graduated 49th of 151, and was commissioned as a second lieutenant in the Coast Artillery Corps.

== Start of career ==
Hasbrouck received his commission on August 30, 1917, and was promoted to first lieutenant on the same day. He performed temporary duty at Fort Winfield Scott, California until December, then began attendance at the Fort Monroe, Virginia Coast Artillery School. He graduated in February 1918 and was assigned to the 62nd Coast Artillery Regiment. Hasbrouck was promoted to temporary captain in March 1918.

== World War I ==
In July 1918, Hasbrouck sailed for France as a member of the 62nd Coast Artillery. The 62nd and two other regiments were organized as the 33rd Coast Artillery Brigade, and the brigade conducted organization and training at Operations and Training Center Number 1 in Libourne, France. Hasbrouck's regiment was still undergoing training when the Armistice of November 11, 1918 ended the war. After the war, Hasbrouck was assigned as executive officer of the military prison at Saint-Sulpice-la-Pointe, where he remained until July 1919.

== Post-World War I ==
From July to October 1919, Hasbrouck was assigned as adjutant of Base Section Number 2, a Services of Supply facility in Bordeaux. From October to December 1919, Hasbrouck served in Warsaw as part of the American Relief Administration, where he instructed the Polish army on the employment of mechanized military equipment.

In January 1920, Hasbrouck joined Motor Command Number 34, a unit of 2nd Brigade, American Forces in Germany. Hasbrouck subsequently served as an instructor assigned to the Army's Motor Transportation Corps School in Kruft. In March 1920, he returned to the permanent rank of first lieutenant. In July 1920, he was promoted to permanent captain and transferred from the Coast Artillery to the Field Artillery Branch.

In November 1920, Hasbrouck returned to the United States and was assigned to the 76th Field Artillery Regiment at Camp Pike, Arkansas. He then attended the Field Artillery Officers' Course at Fort Sill, Oklahoma, after which he remained at Fort Sill to serve on the Artillery School's faculty. In 1924, Hasbrouck was assigned to the 16th Field Artillery Regiment at Fort Myer, Virginia.

== Continued career ==
From 1929 to 1932, Hasbrouck served as professor of military science and tactics at Princeton University. In 1934, he graduated from the Army Command and General Staff School. He was then assigned to duty with the 68th Field Artillery Regiment at Fort Knox, Kentucky, the Army's first mechanized artillery unit.

In 1936, Hasbrouck was promoted to major and began attendance at the United States Army War College, from which he graduated in 1937. After completing the War College, Hasbrouck served on the staff at the War Department, where he participated in drafting the mobilization plan that outlined the steps the Army would take in the event of U.S. entry into World War II. Hasbrouck was promoted to lieutenant colonel in 1940.

== World War II ==
In March 1941, Hasbrouck was assigned to Pine Camp, New York (now Fort Drum), where he took command of the 22nd Armored Artillery Battalion, a unit of the 4th Armored Division. He remained in command until February 1942, when he was promoted to colonel and assigned as chief of staff for the 1st Armored Division at Fort Knox. He served with the 1st AD in England as it completed final preparation to enter combat, then returned to the United States in August. In September 1942, he was promoted to brigadier general and assigned to command Combat Command B, 8th Armored Division, which he led during organization and training at Fort Knox and Fort Polk, Louisiana.

In August 1943, Hasbrouck was assigned as deputy chief of staff for Twelfth United States Army Group, the headquarters that controlled most U.S. forces in Europe. In September 1944, he took command of Combat Command B, 7th Armored Division, which he led during combat in France following the Operation Overlord invasion. In November 1944, Hasbrouck was assigned to command the 7th Armored Division, which played a key role in stopping the German attack during the late 1944 Battle of the Bulge, and the March 1945 Battle of Remagen, which facilitated Allied access into Germany. He was promoted to major general in January 1945.

== Post-World War II ==
In September 1945, Hasbrouck was assigned as deputy chief of staff for the Army Ground Forces. He later served as acting chief of staff and chief of staff. Hasbrouck was diagnosed with high blood pressure and retired for disability in September 1947.

== Awards ==
Hasbrouck's U.S. awards included the Army Distinguished Service Medal, Silver Star, Legion of Merit, and Bronze Star Medal with "V" device for valor. His foreign decorations included the Polish Virtuti Militari (fifth class), Belgian Croix de Guerre, and French Croix de Guerre and Legion of Honor (Chevalier).

== Retirement and death ==
After retiring from the Army, Hasbrouck resided in Washington, D.C. and was the military advisor for the Hoover Commission, which studied the organization of the federal government and made recommendations for improvement and modernization. Among Hasbrouck's recommendations that were adopted was creation of the Chairman of the Joint Chiefs of Staff position. From 1952 to 1960, he served as chairman of the board for the Federal Financial Services Corporation. In addition, he provided assistance to historians, researchers, and writers who studied the 7th Armored Division's wartime service.

Hasbrouck died of congestive heart failure at the Georgetown University Hospital in Washington on August 19, 1985. He was buried at West Point Cemetery in West Point, New York.

== Family ==
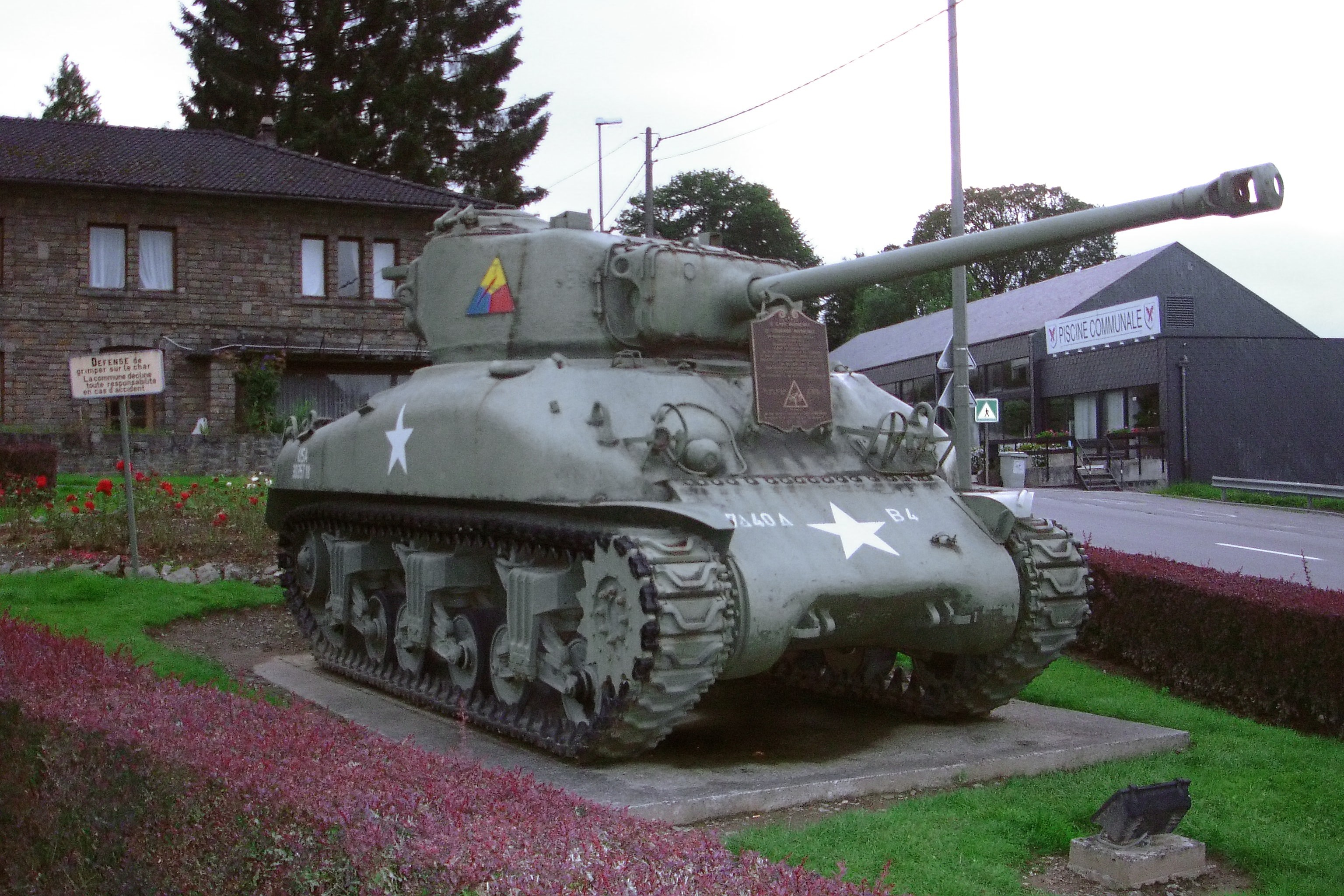
7th Armored Division monument on display in Vielsalm, Belgium

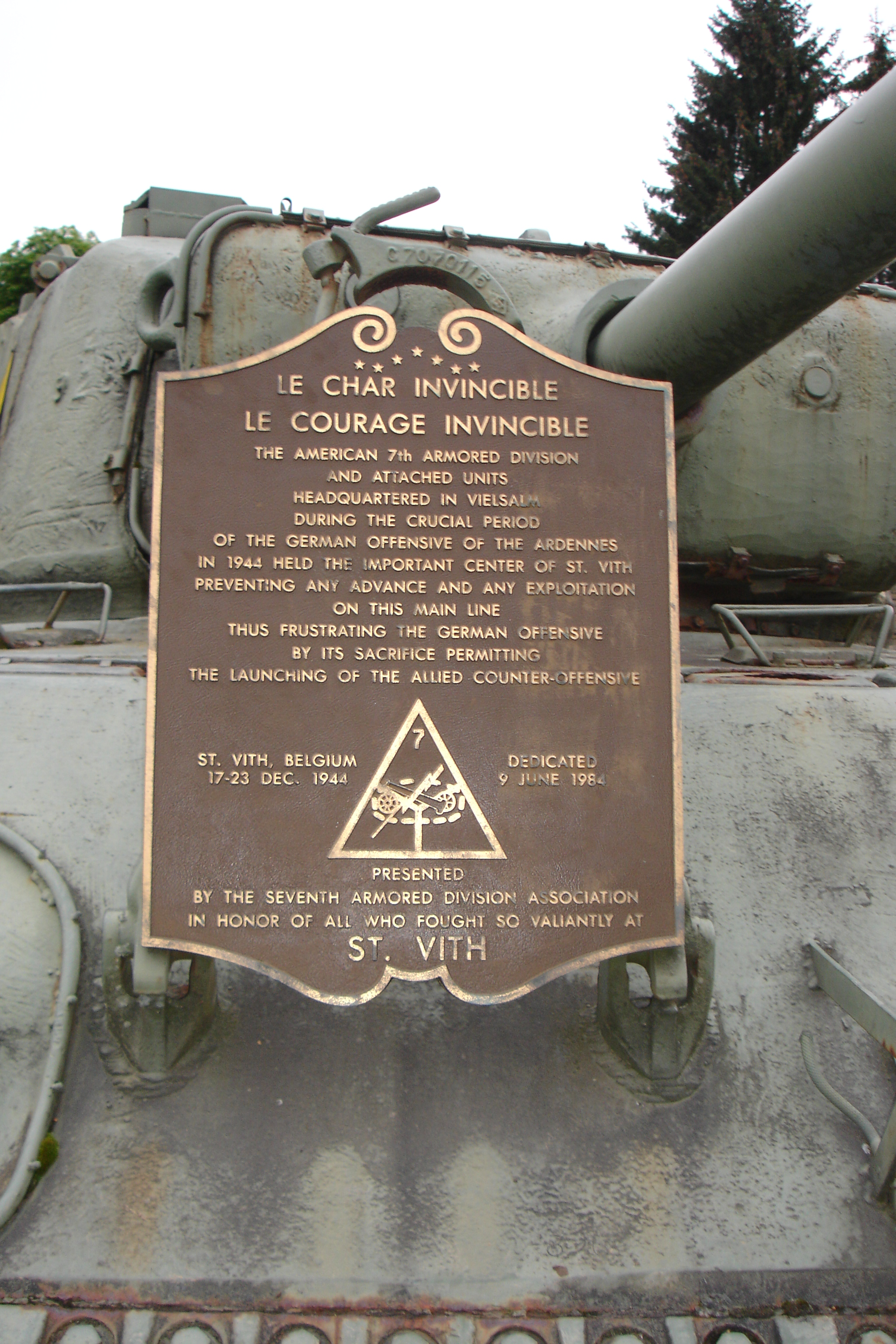
Plaque on 7th Armored Division monument

In 1932, Hasbrouck married Marjorie Nightingale (1904–1990) of Brunswick, Georgia. They were the parents of two children, Robert and Marjorie.

Hasbrouck was the second cousin of Major General Henry Granville Sharpe and first cousin once removed of Major General George H. Sharpe. All three were descendants of Abraham J. Hasbrouck.

== Memorials ==
The town of Vielsalm in Belgium was the headquarters of the 7th Armored Division during the Battle of St. Vith. Vielsalm displays both a 7th Armored Division tank and a stone monument, and the stone monument also commemorates Hasbrouck's wartime leadership of the division.

Military offices
Preceded by Lindsay McDonald Silvester	Commanding General 7th Armored Division; 1944–1945	Succeeded by Truman E. Boudinot
