= Theodore Leslie Futch =

United States Army general

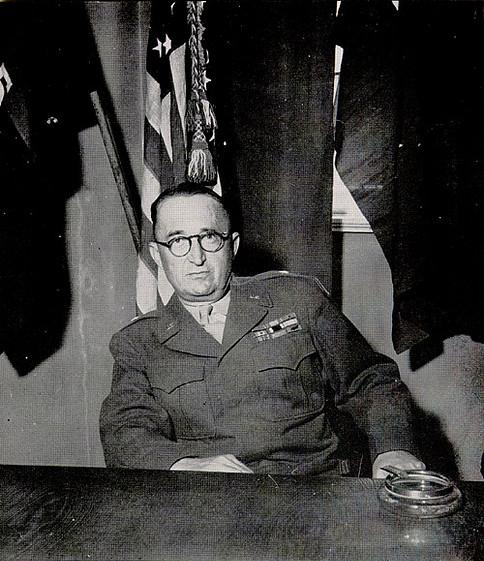
- Born: January 19, 1895; Monroe, North Carolina
- Died: January 18, 1992 (aged 96); Hendersonville, North Carolina
- Burial place: Arlington National Cemetery
- Military career
- Allegiance: United States of America
- Branch: United States Army
- Service years: 1917-1954
- Rank: Brigadier general
- Conflicts: World War I World War II
- Awards: Legion of Merit; Soldier's Medal; Bronze Star Medal (4)

Theodore Leslie Futch (January 19, 1895 – January 18, 1992) was a United States Army officer with the rank of brigadier general. He spent his whole army career in the Field Artillery Branch.

== Early life ==
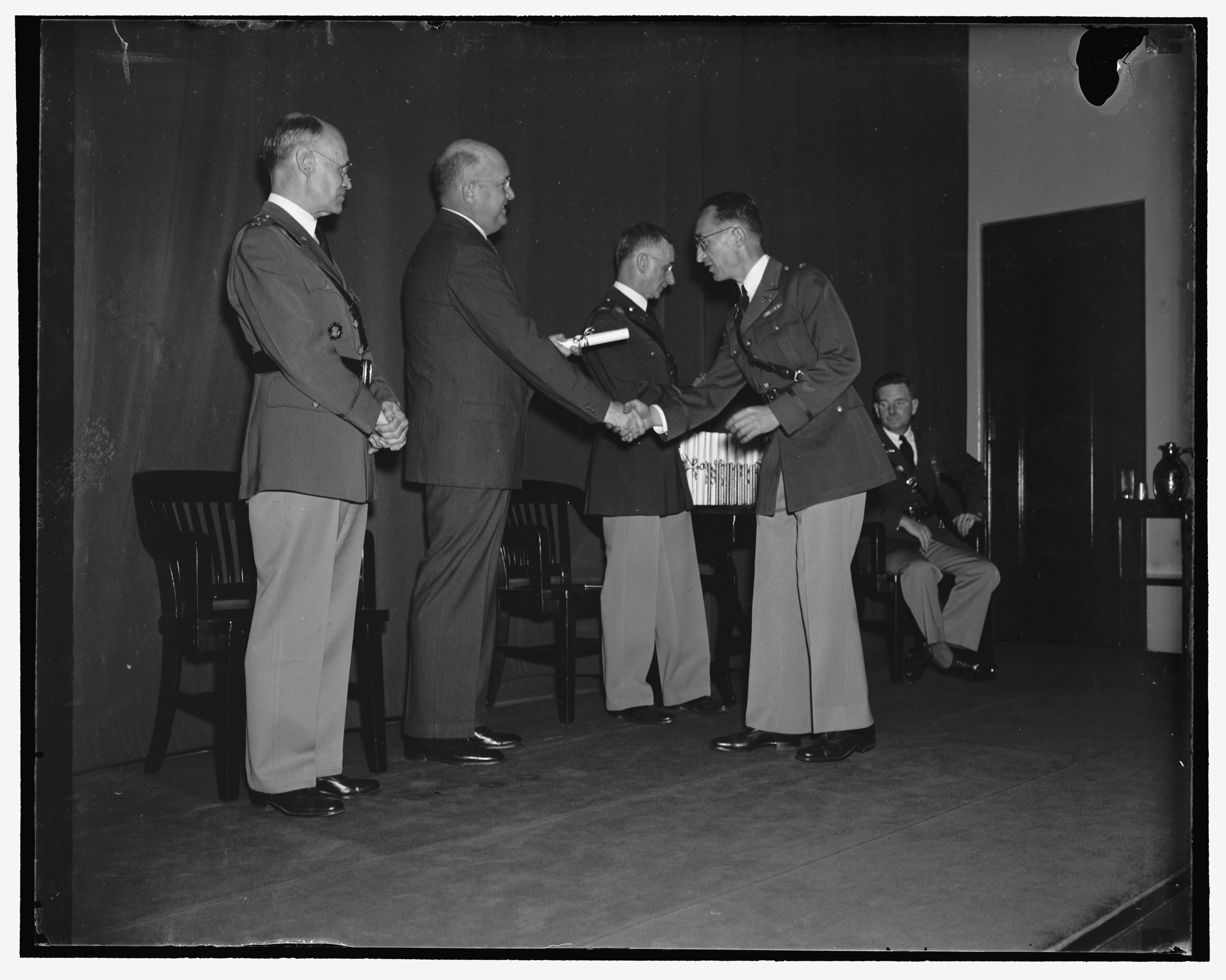
Assistant Secretary of War Louis A. Johnson presents Theodore Futch with his diploma on graduation day at the United States Army War College, Fort Humphreys (June 1938)

Theodore Leslie Futch was born on January 19, 1895, in Monroe, North Carolina. He attended the United States Military Academy at West Point, New York. Futch graduated 26th out of a class of 151 on August 30, 1917, and was commissioned a second lieutenant of Field Artillery.

Futch served in France during World War I and was appointed an aide de camp to Brigadier General Harry G. Bishop, who served as commander of the 3rd Artillery Brigade. He served in this capacity until 1919, when he was transferred back to the States, where he was appointed a professor of military science and tactics at Iowa State College.

In 1926, Futch attended the Battery Officer's Course at United States Army Field Artillery School at Fort Sill, Oklahoma. Subsequently, served there as an instructor until 1930.

While serving as a captain with the 13th Field Artillery Regiment at Oahu, Hawaii, he saved a life from drowning of Private First Class Alexander J. Kaye of the Service Battery. For this action, Futch was awarded with the Soldier's Medal.

In 1935, Futch graduated from the Command and General Staff School at Fort Leavenworth in Kansas. Then he served as a professor of military science and tactics at Alabama Polytechnic Institute until 1939.

== World War II ==
During the year of 1939, Futch was transferred back to Hawaii, where he served with the 11th Field Artillery Brigade. In 1940, Futch was appointed commanding officer of the 3rd Battalion, 18th Field Artillery Regiment. His next service assignment was back at Fort Sill in Oklahoma, where he was appointed executive officer of the Field Artillery School. In 1942, he was appointed an assistant commander of the Field Artillery School.

In December 1942, Futch was transferred to the XIII Corps under command of Major General Emil F. Reinhardt, where he was appointed the corps' artillery commander. He spent his time with the corps in the states, and in November 1943, he was promoted to the rank of brigadier general.

In 1944, he was transferred to the 35th Infantry Division under the command of Major General Paul W. Baade as its artillery commander. Then, he was sent to the European Theater. With 35th Division, Futch participated in many battles of World War II, including in France, Luxembourg, the Netherlands, Belgium and Germany. Futch stayed with the 35th Division until September 1945, where the Division returned to the states. For his service with the 35th Infantry Division during the war, Futch was awarded with the Legion of Merit, four Bronze Star Medals and multiple foreign decorations.

== Postwar life ==
On September 25, 1945, Futch was appointed the commanding general of Fort Bragg in North Carolina and stayed in this capacity until the beginning of January 1946. Futch then served as executive officer of the Civilian Components at Fort McPherson, Georgia, before he was transferred to The Citadel, where he was a professor of Military Science & Tactics until 1950.

His last military assignment was as commanding general of the Fort Indiantown Gap in Pennsylvania, where he retired on August 31, 1954.

Following his retirement, he served as the commandant of cadets at Lyman Ward Military Academy in Camp Hill, Alabama, from 1959 through 1967.

== Personal life ==
Futch married three times: He married his second wife in 1925 to Ida Reid Calhoun, with whom he had a daughter, Ida. They divorced in 1929, but Futch married again in 1931 to Margaret McLean Chase and had a son, David, and two daughters, Ellen and Katherine.

== Decorations ==
Here is Brigadier General Futch's ribbon bar:

1st Row	Legion of Merit		Soldier's Medal	Bronze Star Medal with three Oak Leaf Clusters
2nd Row	Army Commendation Medal	World War I Victory Medal with Battle Clasp	Army of Occupation of Germany Medal	American Defense Service Medal with Foreign Service Clasp
3rd Row	American Campaign Medal	European-African-Middle Eastern Campaign Medal with one silver campaign star	World War II Victory Medal	Army of Occupation Medal
4th Row	National Defense Service Medal	Chevalier of the Legion of Honor (France)	French Croix de guerre 1939-1945 with Palm	Knight of the Dutch Order of Orange-Nassau
