= Daniel Noce =

United States Army general

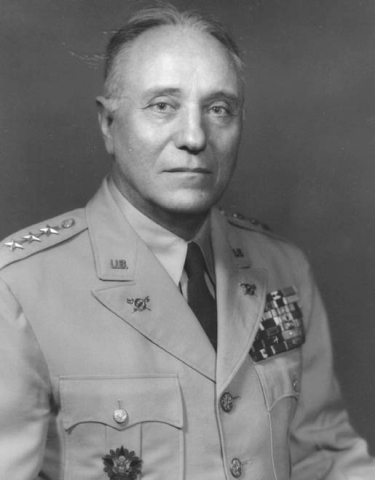
- Born: November 3, 1894; Denver, Colorado, U.S.
- Died: February 17, 1976 (aged 81) Sperryville, Virginia, U.S.
- Allegiance: United States
- Branch: United States Army
- Service years: 1917–1954
- Rank: Lieutenant General
- Commands: Engineer Amphibious Command; War Department Civil Affairs Division; U.S. Army Inspector General
- Conflicts: World War I; World War II
- Awards: Distinguished Service Medal (5); Legion of Merit
- Other work: Executive, Donnelly-Kelley Glass Company

Daniel Noce (1894−1976) was a U.S. Army Lieutenant General who served in both world wars.

Over his decorated military career he rose to the position of Inspector General of the Army. Following his retirement from the armed forces, he served as an executive at Michigan's Donnelly-Kelley Glass Company.

Noce died in Sperryville, Virginia on February 17, 1976.

== Early life ==
He was born on November 3, 1894, in Denver, Colorado. His father was Angelo Noce, who founded the first Italian newspaper in Colorado (La Stella) and led the push for the Columbus Day holiday. Daniel learned woodworking and carpentry in high school and made furniture as a hobby throughout his life. He received an appointment to the United States Military Academy at West Point and took up boxing, breaking his nose twice. He graduated from West Point in April 1917, and dropped his first name of Angelo shortly thereafter. He was appointed a second lieutenant.

Upon graduation he was in the Cavalry, later transferring into the Army Corps of Engineers.

From June to December, 1917 he served with the 4th Engineer Regiment at Vancouver Barracks, Washington, Camp Greene, North Carolina and Camp Humphreys, Virginia.

He married Mildred Newcomb Wilson, the granddaughter of Astronomer Simon Newcomb, in 1918 in Washington DC.

== Military career ==
=== World War I ===
Noce served in France during World War I. In March, 1918 he was appointed Adjutant of the 602nd Engineer Regiment, and he advanced to regimental commander in August. He commanded the regiment during the Saint-Mihiel and Meuse-Argonne Offensives, and remained in Germany on occupation duty until 1919.

=== Post-World War I ===
In 1920 Noce sued in the U.S. Court of Claims for longevity pay he claimed was due to him. His claim was based on the argument that his time in service should count from when he entered West Point, and not when he received his commission. He prevailed in the lower court in a decision that could have affected the pay of thousands of Army officers, but the U.S. Supreme Court reversed the decision.

In 1921 Noce received a bachelor's degree in civil engineering from the Massachusetts Institute of Technology. In the 1920s and early 1930s he served in a variety of engineer assignments, including postings to New York City, Fort Gordon, Georgia and the Office of the Chief of Engineers. He also graduated from the Command and General Staff College and the Army War College.

In the 1930s he and his family were stationed in the Philippines.

From 1937 to 1939 he was District Engineer in Memphis, Tennessee, supervising Mississippi River levee and dam maintenance and flood control. From 1940 to 1941 he was District Engineer in Los Angeles, California, overseeing harbor expansion and defense in anticipation of World War II.

=== World War II ===
Noce served throughout World War II. In 1942 he was named to command the Engineer Amphibian Command at Camp Edwards, Massachusetts as a brigadier general. In this assignment he developed organizations, equipment, and techniques used in the D-Day invasion and the Allied offensive in the Pacific Islands.

From 1943 to 1944 he was Deputy Chief of Staff for U.S. forces in the European Theater of Operations, receiving promotion to major general as planner and overseer of the engineer effort that supported military operations in North Africa and Italy. From 1944 to 1945 he performed a similar function in the Mediterranean Theater of Operations.

From 1945 to 1946 Noce was Director of Plans and Operations at Headquarters, Army Service Forces in Washington, D.C.

=== Post World War II ===
In 1946 Noce he was appointed Director of the War Department's Civil Affairs Division, serving until 1948 and receiving promotion to lieutenant general. In this assignment he led a mission to expand cultural and economic relations between the Philippines and China, and the Philippines and Japan following World War II.

From 1949 to 1952 he was Chief of Staff for the U.S. European Command in Germany, and played an important part in implementing rebuilding efforts undertaken as part of the Marshall Plan.

In 1952 he was appointed Inspector General of the Army, where he served until his 1954 retirement.

General Noce's decorations included five awards of the Distinguished Service Medal and the Legion of Merit.

== Civilian career ==
After retiring from the Army he was an executive with Michigan's Donnelly-Kelley Glass Company.

== Retirement and death ==
Upon his retirement in 1955, Lt. General Daniel Noce purchased a 1200-acre farm near Sperryville, Virginia and produced award-winning yields of corn and prized Black Angus beef.

He served on the Rappahannock River Basin Advisory Committee, which advised state and local governments about water use and long term planning, including construction of the proposed Salem Church Dam.

Noce died in Sperryville, Virginia on February 17, 1976.

== Personal ==
General Noce was the father of Mildred Wilson Noce (1922–1968) and Colonel Robert Wilson Noce (1926–2005), a 1949 West Point graduate who commanded the 1st Squadron, 10th Cavalry Regiment of the 4th Infantry Division during the Vietnam War.

== Sources ==
- Biographical Register of the Officers and Graduates of the U.S. Military Academy, George W. Cullum, 1920, Volume VI-B, page 1864
- Open Jurist web site, 268 US 13, U.S. Vs. Noce, http://openjurist.org/268/us/613/united-states-v-noce
- U.S. Army Register, U.S. Army Adjutant General's Office, 1922, page 304
- Newspaper article, South Harassed by Flood Waters, Kingsport (Tennessee) Times, February 20, 1938
- Omaha Beach: A Flawed Victory, Adrian R. Lewis, 2003, page 70
- Official Register of the United States, U.S. Civil Service Commission, 1940, Page 39
- Newspaper article, General Awarded Military Medal, Associated Press, printed in the Salt Lake Tribune, January 28, 1943
- Newspaper article, Invasion of Europe Moves Step Nearer, Kingston (Jamaica) Gleaner, May 31, 1943
- Newspaper article, General Noce Takes Staff Post in London, Hartford Courant, May 31, 1943
- Newspaper article, Forces Ready When Needed, Ironwood (Michigan) Daily Globe, June 8, 1943
- Newspaper article, Five Generals Named for Three-Star Rank, Los Angeles Times, March 4, 1944
- Newspaper article, Gen. Noce Is Elevated; Amphibian Expert Appointed to Civil Affairs Post, New York Times, December 11, 1946
- Newspaper article, Air Forces Given Half of Top Jobs, Berkshire (Massachusetts) Evening Eagle, January 20, 1947
- Newspaper article, Trade Survey Slated in P.I. by Noce Group, Pacific Stars and Stripes, May 4, 1948
- Newspaper article, Americans Anxious To Industrialise Japan, Canberra (Australia) Times, May 5, 1948
- Newspaper article, Gen. Noce to Succeed Taylor as Chief of Staff, European Stars and Stripes, August 9, 1949
- Newspaper article, Noce Named New Army IG, European Stars and Stripes, May 1, 1952
- Newspaper article, EUCOM bids Farewell to Gen. Noce, European Stars and Stripes, June 8, 1952
- Military Times, Hall of Heroes, Index of Recipients of Major Military Awards, http://www.homeofheroes.com/verify/recipients_n.html
- Newspaper article, Retired General Accepts Position at Glass Company, Holland (Michigan) Evening Sentinel, July 11, 1955
- Newspaper article, Committee Launches into Study On Big River Basin Plans, Fredericksburg Free Lance-Star, June 4, 1966
- Newspaper article, River Group Will Hear Engineer, Fredericksburg Free Lance-Star, July 18, 1969
- Newspaper article, Rivers Act Concern Shown, Fredericksburg Free Lance-Star February 5, 1970
- Armored Combat in Vietnam, Donn A. Starry, 1982, page 228
- Army R, D & A magazine, published by U.S. Army Materiel Development and Readiness Command, 1978, volume 19, number 6, page 25
- Newspaper article, Obituary, Robert W. Noce, Quad Cities (Illinois) Dispatch, December 1, 2005

Military offices
Preceded by Louis A. Craig	Inspector General of the U. S. Army; June 1, 1952 – October 31, 1954	Succeeded by Wayne C. Zimmerman
