= Raymond E. S. Williamson =

United States Army general (1894–1957)

Raymond Eccleston Serveira Williamson
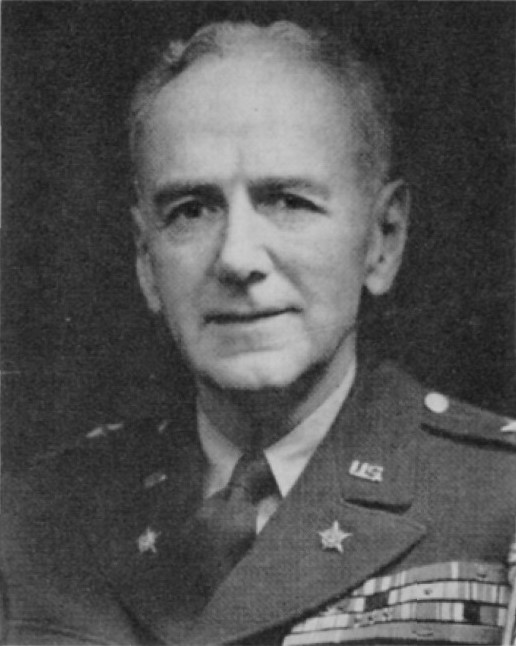
- BG Raymond E. S. Williamson
- Born: September 1, 1894; Brooklyn, New York, United States
- Died: September 27, 1957 (aged 63); Monterey, California, United States
- Burial place: Arlington National Cemetery, Virginia, United States
- Military career
- Allegiance: United States
- Branch: United States Army
- Service years: 1917−1954
- Rank: Brigadier General
- Unit: Field Artillery Branch
- Commands: 3rd Armored Division
- Conflicts: World War I World War II
- Awards: Silver Star; Legion of Merit; Bronze Star (3)

Brigadier General Raymond Eccleston Serveira Williamson (September 1, 1894 – September 27, 1957) was a highly decorated officer in the United States Army who served in both World War I and World War II. A graduate of the United States Military Academy, he is most noted for his service during World War II as commanding general of Service Command, South Pacific Theater of Operations and as the assistant division commander (ADC) of the 91st Infantry Division during the Italian campaign.

Williamson remained in the army following the end of World War II, and held several important assignments, including Military Attaché to Canada and later the United Kingdom and commanding general (CG) of the 3rd Armored Division.

== Early years ==
Williamson was born on September 1, 1894, in Brooklyn, New York, as the son of Sidney and Alice Williamson. Following high school, he studied one year at Amherst College in Amherst, Massachusetts, before received an appointment to the United States Military Academy at West Point, New York, in May 1913. During his time at the academy, he was active in the boxing team and reached the rank of cadet captain.

Shortly after the American entry into World War I Williamson graduated that August with a Bachelor of Science degree. He was commissioned as a second lieutenant in the United States Army Cavalry Branch. He completed his basic training at Fort Riley, Kansas, and Fort Logan, Kansas, with the 21st Cavalry and then embarked for France in mid-1918 attached to the 157th Field Artillery Brigade, part of the 82nd "All American" Division. He participated in the Meuse–Argonne offensive and was decorated with the Legion of Honour by the Government of France and also received the Belgian Croix de Guerre.

== Between the wars ==
Following the Armistice with Germany on November 11, 1918, which brought the war to an end, Williamson was attached to the 1st Division and took part in the Allied occupation of the Rhineland. He returned to the United States in mid-1919 and served as a troop commander at Fort Myer, Virginia, with additional duty as junior aide to the White House during the tenure of President Warren G. Harding.

In August 1922, he was ordered to Harvard University for a year of study, preparatory to detail at West Point, New York, in the newly established Department of Economics and Government, where he subsequently served as an instructor. During this assignment, Williamson met his future wife Anne Bryan, a daughter of rear admiral Benjamin C. Bryan.

He was ordered back to the USMA in the summer of 1924 and served as first lieutenant and instructor in the Department of Economics and Government, and Political History until late 1926. Williamson returned to West Point in July 1932 and served as captain and assistant Instructor in the Department of Tactics and Personnel Officer of the Academy during the tenure of Lieutenant Colonel Robert C. Richardson. Upon an appointment of the new commandant, Simon B. Buckner Jr. in June 1933, Williamson was appointed as his assistant.

Williamson entered the Command and General Staff School in June 1935 and following his graduation one year later, he served as a troop and squadron commander with the 7th Cavalry until July 1939, when he was detailed to the Army War College. He graduated in June 1940 and joined the Office of the Assistant Chief of Staff for Logistics (G-4), War Department General Staff. He was promoted to lieutenant colonel on August 30, 1940.

== World War II ==
Following America's entry into World War II, in December 1941, Williamson was, on February 1, 1942, promoted to the temporary rank of colonel and was appointed Chief of Rail Transportation Section in the Office of the Assistant Chief of Staff for Logistics (G-4). The war, however, demanded skilled officers and Williamson was ordered to Nouméa, New Caledonia, where he joined the headquarters of the newly activated 23rd Infantry Division under Major General Alexander Patch and assumed duty as Divisional Personnel Officer (G-1).

He was promoted to the temporary rank of brigadier general on August 5, 1942 and assumed duty as Commanding General, Service Command, South Pacific Theater of Operations. In this capacity, he was responsible for the supply, salvage, evacuation, construction, personnel management, quartering and sanitation needs of all units during the Guadalcanal and New Georgia campaigns. Williamson distinguished himself and received the Legion of Merit.

Williamson remained in the South Pacific until the end of November 1943 and returned to the United States. Following a brief leave at home, he received orders to join the headquarters of the 91st Infantry Division, commanded by Major General William G. Livesay, at Camp White, Oregon, as the 91st's assistant division commander (ADC), taking over from brigadier General William E. Crist. After several months of training, the 91st Division departed for the Mediterranean Theater of Operations (MTO) in April 1944.

The 91st Division was scheduled for the Italian front as part of the U.S. Fifth Army under Lieutenant General Mark W. Clark (a 1917 West Point classmate of Williamson). Brigadier General Williamson commanded a Task Force of his division during the liberation of the cities of Livorno and Pisa and received the Bronze Star for his leadership. He remained in that assignment during the combats on the Gothic Line and received another two Bronze Stars.

During the Spring offensive in April 1945 (Operation Grapeshot), the final offensive of the Italian campaign, Williamson distinguished himself in the vicinity of Vedelago, when an enemy strong point held up forward Infantry elements of his Division, Williamson went forward through machine gun and small arms fire to determine the best method of meeting the situation. He called for tanks and personally directed mortar fire and promptly routed the enemy force. For this heroic action, he was decorated with the Silver Star for gallantry in action.

Following the surrender of German forces in Italy at the beginning of May 1945, the 91st Infantry Division remained stationed in that country until late September, when the elements began returning to the United States. Williamson's effort during the Italian campaign was recognized by the Allies and he was decorated with the Order of the British Empire and Italian Order of Saints Maurice and Lazarus.

== Postwar career ==
Williamson returned to the United States and was ordered to Chicago, Illinois, where he joined the headquarters, Second United States Army under Lieutenant General Lloyd Fredendall as his Assistant Chief of Staff for Operations (G-3). He remained in that capacity until February 1946, when he was reverted to the peacetime rank of colonel and appointed Military Attaché to Canada with a seat at the Embassy in Ottawa. Williamson served in that capacity until the end of May 1949, when he returned to the United States for brief service as Assistant Chief of Staff for Operations (G-3) at Armored Center, Fort Knox, Kentucky.

On July 17, 1949, he was promoted again to the rank of brigadier general and ordered to the headquarters of the 3rd Armored Division as ADC under Major General Roderick R. Allen. The 3rd Armored Division was tasked with the training of replacement units during the Korean War and following the departure of Allen in June 1950, Williamson assumed interim command of the division. He held that command until February 1951, when he resumed his duties as ADC upon the arrival of Major General Ira P. Swift. Williamson was once again appointed CG of the division in October 1951 and remained in that capacity until November 1952, when he was relieved by his West Point classmate, Brigadier General John T. Cole.

For his service with 3rd Armored Division, Williamson received a letter of appreciation by the Secretary of the Army, Frank Pace, which states: "During my entire service as Secretary of the Army, I have never been privileged to hear a more meaningful and effective message concerning the American soldier than the one delivered by you to your men."

Williamson was subsequently ordered to London, England, and assumed duty as Military Attaché to Great Britain. He served in this capacity until his retirement from the army on July 31, 1954, after almost thirty-seven years of active service.

== Retirement ==
Following his retirement from the army, Williamson settled with his wife in Monterey, California. In June 1957, he was diagnosed with cancer of the lungs and liver in an advanced stage. Williamson died on September 27, 1957, at his home, at the age of 63, and was buried with full military honors at Arlington National Cemetery, Virginia. His wife, Anne Bryan Williamson (1894–1969) is buried beside him. They had together his three daughters: Marianne, Alice and Louise.

== Decorations ==
Brigadier General Williamson's ribbon bar:

1st Row	Silver Star	Legion of Merit	Bronze Star Medal with two Oak Leaf Clusters	World War I Victory Medal with two battle clasps
2nd Row	Army of Occupation of Germany Medal	American Defense Service Medal with Clasp	American Campaign Medal	Asiatic–Pacific Campaign Medal with one 3/16 inch service star
3rd Row	European-African-Middle Eastern Campaign Medal with three 3/16 inch service stars	World War II Victory Medal	Army of Occupation Medal	National Defense Service Medal
4th Row	Commander of the Order of the British Empire	Knight of the Legion of Honor (France)	Order of Saints Maurice and Lazarus, Knight (Italy)	Belgian Croix de guerre 1914-1918 with Palm

Military offices
Preceded by Arthur R. Walk	Commanding General 3rd Armored Division; 1951–1952	Succeeded by John T. Cole
