= Michael A. Crosby =

United States Army command sergeant major

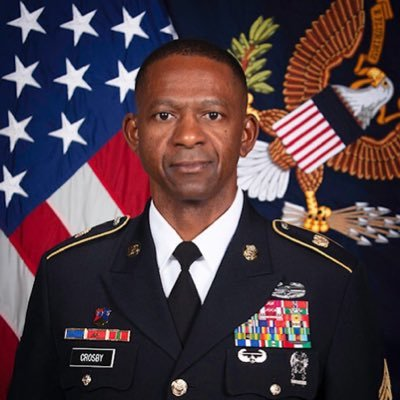
- Military career
- Allegiance: United States of America
- Branch: United States Army
- Service years: 1988–2022
- Rank: Command Sergeant Major

Michael A. Crosby is a retired United States Army command sergeant major who has served as the senior enlisted leader of the United States Army Futures Command. CSM Crosby acted as the principal advisor to the commander and staff on matters of health, welfare, morale, professional development and the effective utilization of personnel assigned to the command.

== Military career ==
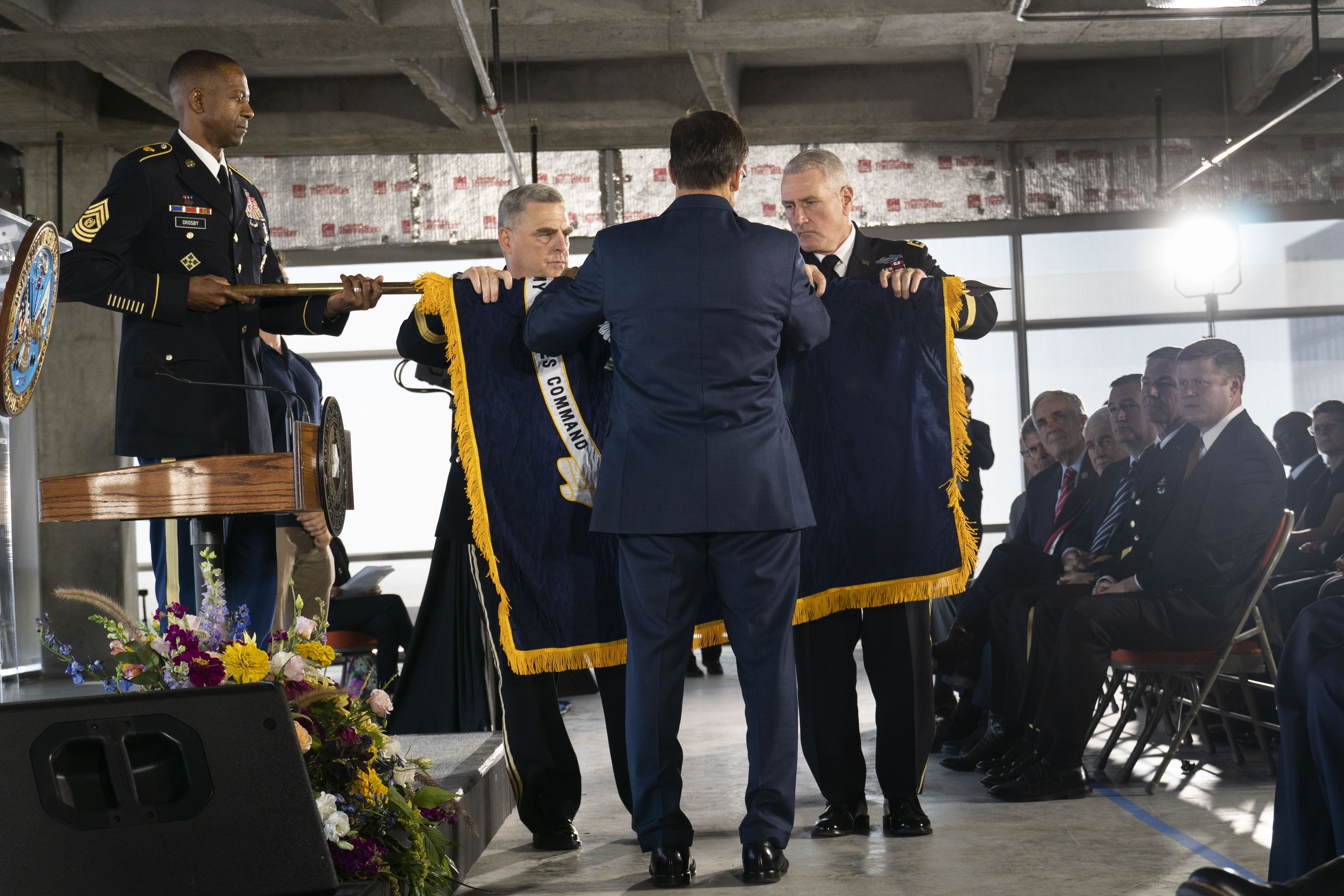
Command Sgt. Maj. Michael A. Crosby, left, bears the colors of Army Futures Command, as General Mark Milley, then-Secretary of the Army Mark Esper, and General John M. Murray unfurl the colors on 24 August 2018, in Austin, Texas

Crosby enlisted in the United States Army in August, 1988. He has a bachelor's degree in criminal justice from American Military University and a master's degree for business administration in human resources management from Trident University. He attended the Army Strategic Leader Development Program-Intermediate Course, Executive Leaders Course, and Keystone Leaders Course.

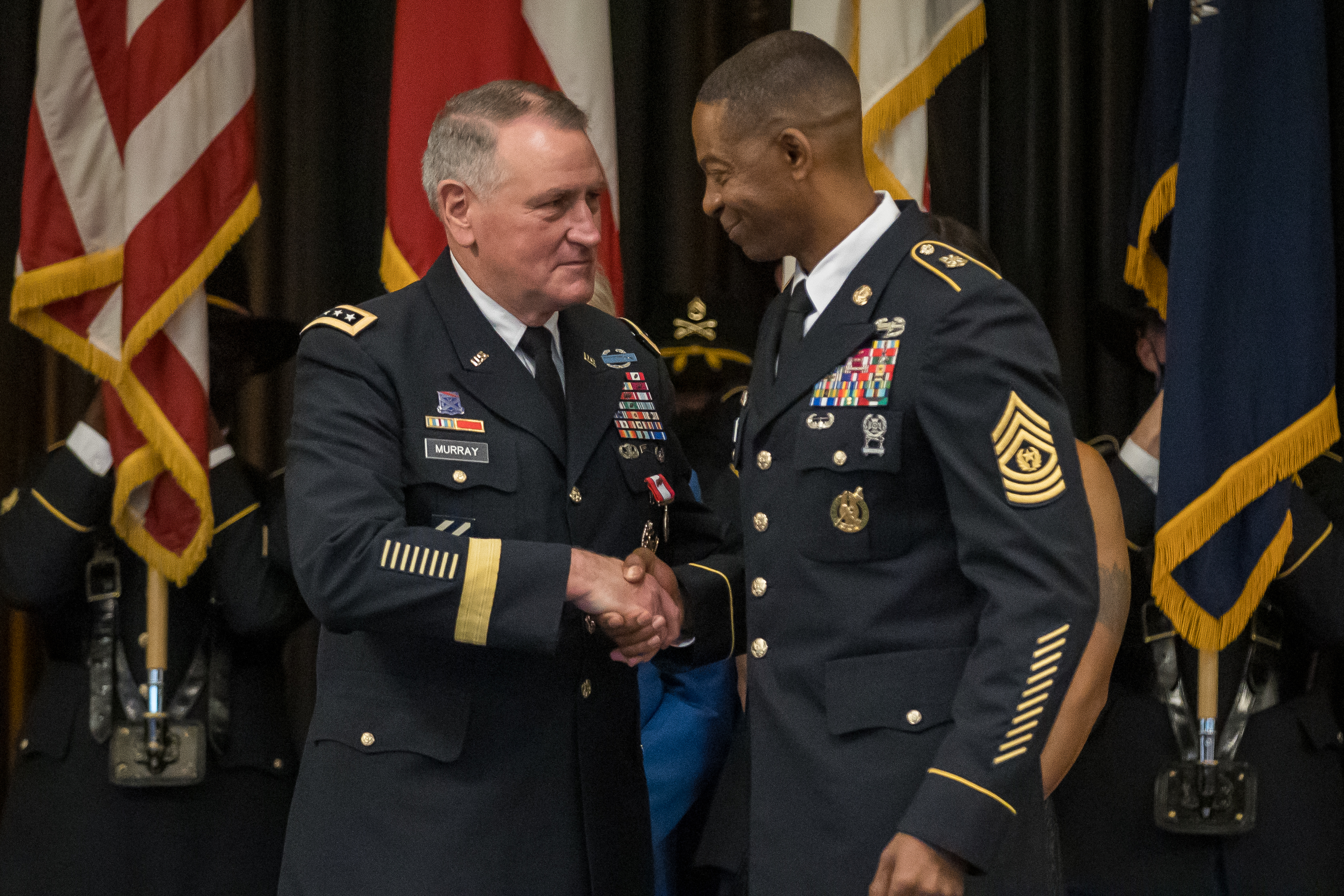
General Murray and CSM Crosby congratulate each other on their retirements, 3 December 2021.
