= Edmond Brown =

U.S. Army general officer

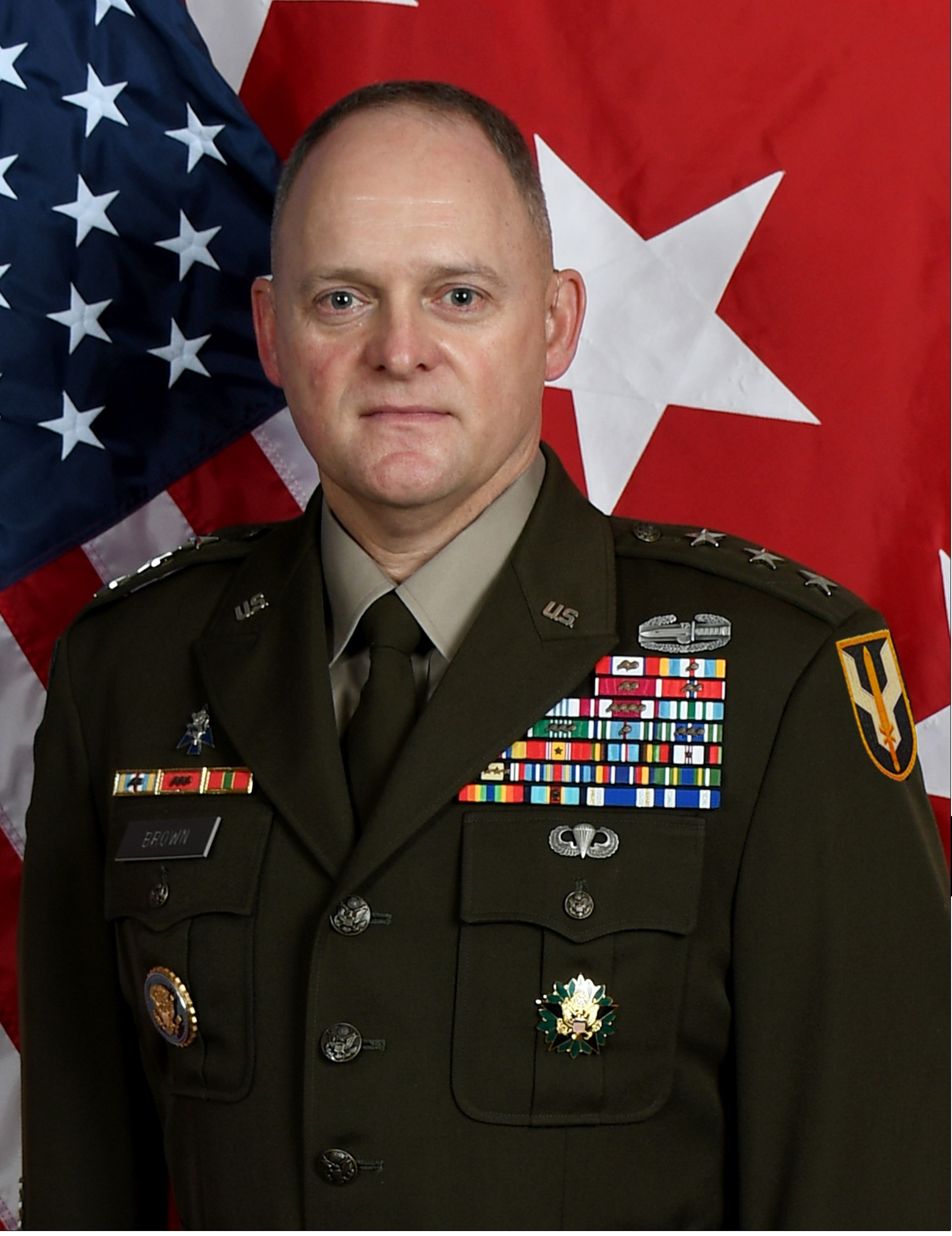
- Official portrait, 2026
- Born: Honea Path, South Carolina, U.S.
- Military career
- Allegiance: United States
- Branch: United States Army
- Service years: 1994–present
- Rank: Lieutenant General
- Commands: United States Army Transformation and Training Command; United States Army Combat Capabilities Development Command
- Awards: Army Distinguished Service Medal; Defense Superior Service Medal (2); Legion of Merit (3); Bronze Star Medal (3)

Edmond Miles Brown is a United States Army lieutenant general currently serving as the deputy commanding general of United States Army Transformation and Training Command . He most recently served as the deputy commanding general and chief of staff of the United States Army Futures Command from 2023 to 2024. He also served as the commanding general of the United States Army Combat Capabilities Development Command.

In July 2024, Brown was nominated for promotion to lieutenant general and assignment as deputy commanding general for combat development of the United States Army Futures Command.

Military offices
Preceded by Matthew J. Van Wagenen	Deputy Commanding General (Support) of the 1st Cavalry Division; 2018–2019	Succeeded by ???
Preceded by ???	Deputy Director and Chief of Staff of Futures and Concepts Center; 2019–2021	Succeeded by Guy M. Jones
Preceded by John A. George	Commanding General of the United States Army Combat Capabilities Development Command; 2021–2023	Succeeded by John M. Cushing
Preceded by ???	Chief of Staff of the United States Army Futures Command; 2023–2024	Succeeded by Michael C. McCurry II
Preceded by Richard R. Coffman	Deputy Commanding General for Combat Development of the United States Army Futures Command; 2024–present	Incumbent
