= Command sergeant major =

Senior enlisted member of U.S. Army battalion or higher

Command sergeant major is a non-commissioned rank and position of office in the United States Army. It is also a classification of several senior appointments in the British Army held by warrant officers class 1.

== United Kingdom ==
Several of the most senior appointments in the British Army are called command sergeant majors (Comd SM) with the rank of warrant officer class 1. The Army Command Sergeant Major, also known as the Army Sergeant Major, is the most senior warrant officer in the British Army. Other command sergeant majors are the most senior warrant officer in a corps or a special establishment, such as the Royal Artillery Sergeant Major and the Academy Sergeant Major, Royal Military Academy Sandhurst.

Insignia of the Army Command Sergeant Major

Insignia of a command sergeant major

== United States ==
Command Sergeant Major
- Army insignia
- Country: United States
- Service branch: United States Army
- Abbreviation: CSM
- Rank group: Non-commissioned officer
- NATO rank code: OR-9
- Pay grade: E-9
- Formation: May 28, 1968
- Next higher rank: Sergeant Major of the Army
- Next lower rank: Sergeant major

The holder of the rank and position of command sergeant major (CSM) is the most senior enlisted member of a color-bearing Army unit (battalion or higher). The CSM is appointed to serve as a spokesman to address the issues of all personnel assigned to the command, representing enlisted members and warrant and commissioned officers. As such, they are the senior enlisted advisor to the commander. The exact duties vary depending on the unit commander, including observing training and talking with soldiers and their families.

The duties of a sergeant major have been defined in the U.S. Army since the days of von Steuben (1779). The need for a senior enlisted advisor to a commander was recognized in the Vietnam War era (December 1966).

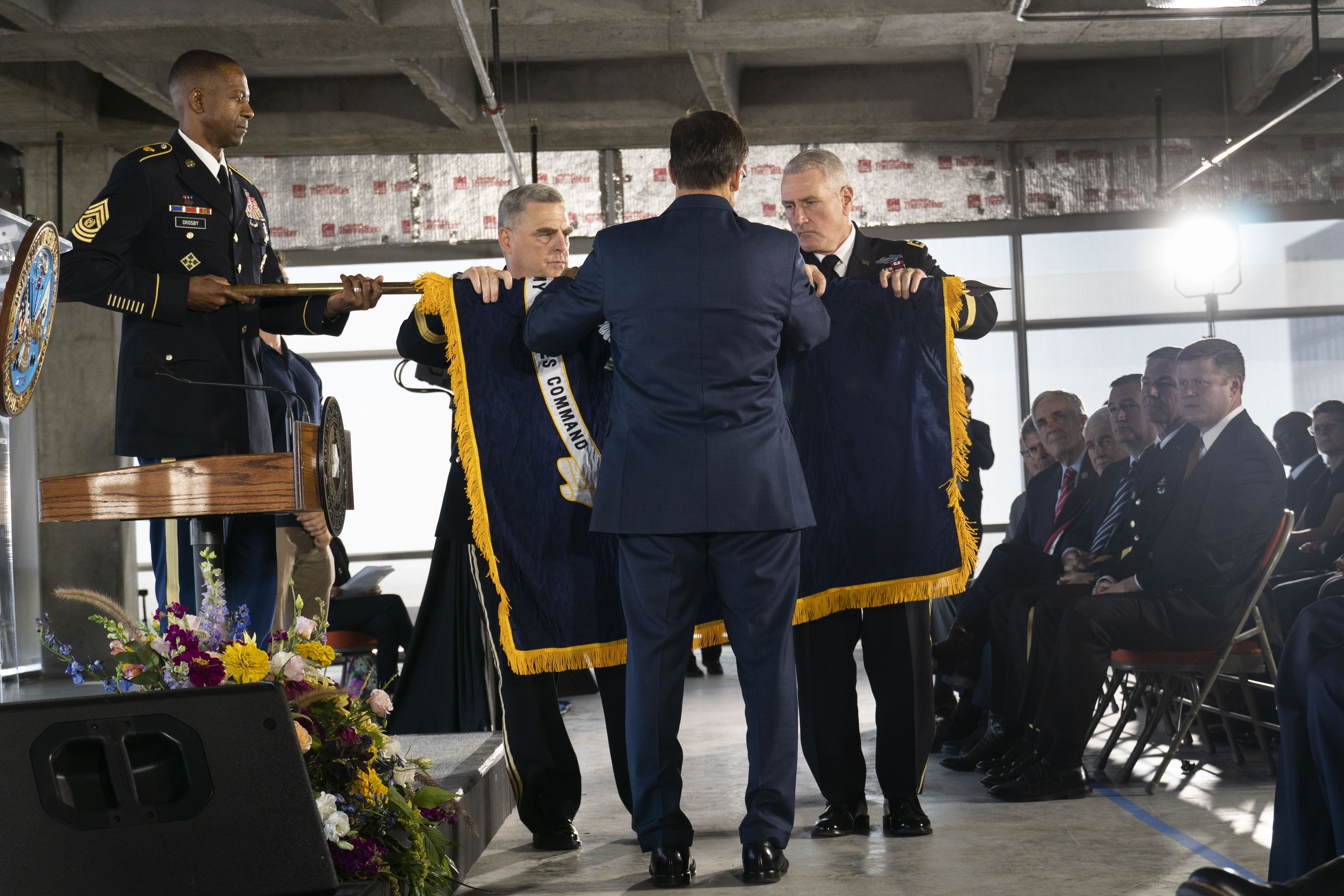
Command Sgt. Maj. Michael A. Crosby, left, bears the colors of Army Futures Command, as General Mark Milley, 23rd secretary of the army Mark Esper, and General John M. Murray unfurl the colors on 24 August 2018, in Austin, Texas.

The command sergeant major, as the most senior sergeant of a color-bearing unit and advisor to the unit commander, began on May 28, 1968, under Army chief of staff Gen. Harold K. Johnson who created the Command Sergeants Major Program.

Command sergeants major were originally thought of as someone who would advocate for enlisted soldiers, focusing on "problems affecting enlisted personnel and their solutions." After much debate, the Army published a definitive doctrine on the CSM's duties in Field Manual 22-600-20, The Duties, Responsibilities, and Authority of NCO’s (1980).

Current CSM duties are defined in TC 7-22.7, The Noncommissioned Officer Guide and fall into six categories: readiness, training, leadership, communications, operations and program management.

CSMs are selected for assignment only after training as top enlisted leaders.

CSM insignia timeline

1966–1968, the only authorized insignia for all sergeants major

1968–1979, became command sergeant major
