= Laura J. Richardson =

US Army general

Laura Richardson
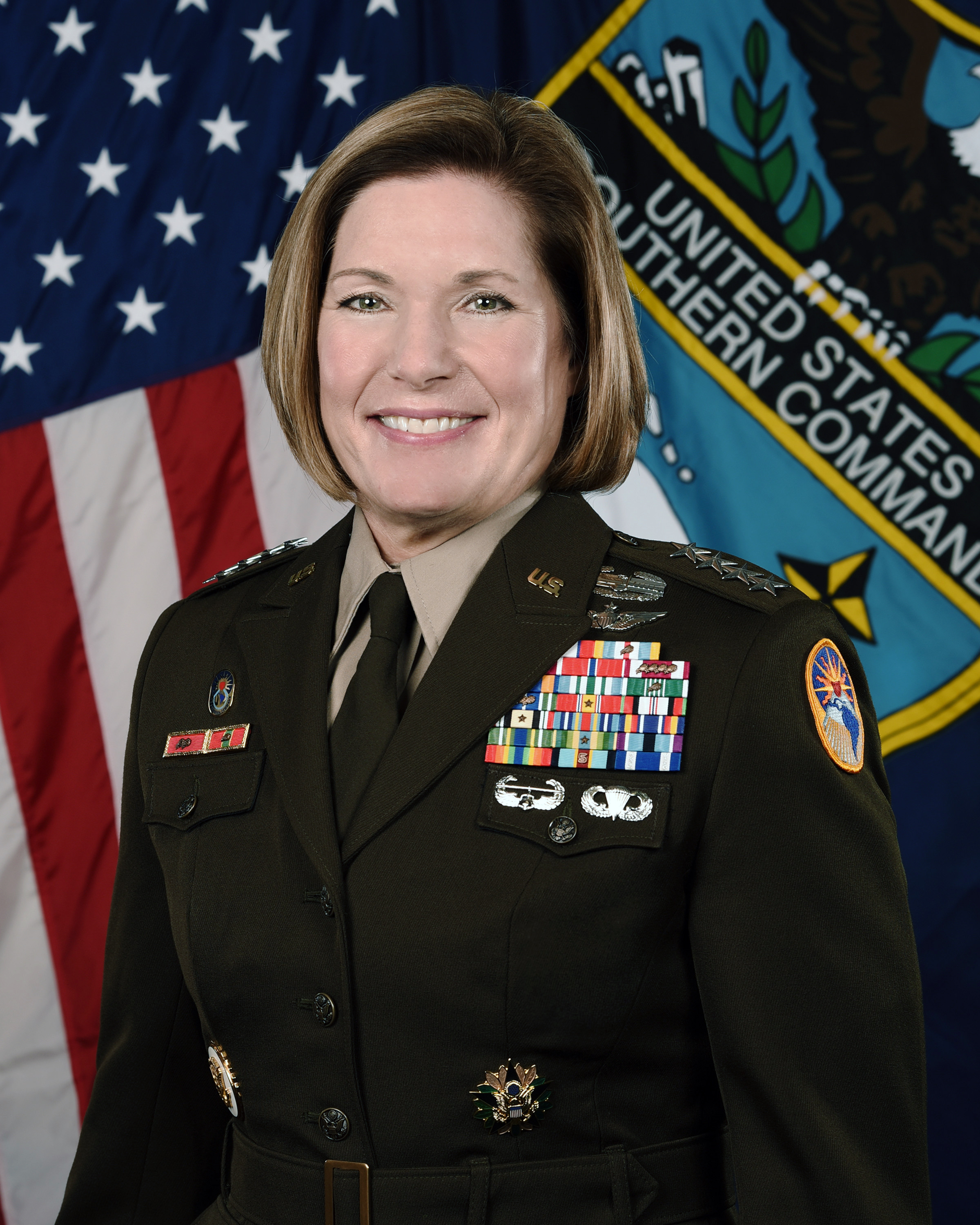
- Born: Laura Jane Strickland; 11 December 1963 (age 62); Kansas City, Missouri, U.S.
- Allegiance: United States
- Branch: United States Army
- Service years: 1986–2025
- Rank: General
- Commands: United States Southern Command; United States Army North; United States Army Forces Command (acting); Army Legislative Liaison Office; Operational Test Command, Fort Hood; Army Garrison, Fort Myer; 5th Battalion, 101st Aviation Regiment
- Conflicts: Iraq War
- Awards: Defense Distinguished Service Medal; Army Distinguished Service Medal (2); Defense Superior Service Medal; Legion of Merit (3); Bronze Star
- Education: Metropolitan State University of Denver (BS); National Defense University (MS)
- Spouse: Lieutenant General James M. Richardson
- [[:File:Opening Statement of GEN Laura J. Richardson at 2022 NORTHCOM and SOUTHCOM Posture Hearing.oga|Laura J. Richardson's typeopening statement at a Senate Armed Services Committee hearing on the 2022 USSOUTHCOM posture Recorded 24 March 2022]]

Laura Jane Richardson (née Strickland; born 11 December 1963) is a retired United States Army general who last served as the commander of United States Southern Command from 2021 to 2024. Prior to that, she was the commanding general of United States Army North from 2019 to 2021.

As an army aviator, Richardson flew Sikorsky UH-60 Black Hawk helicopters. Promoted to brigadier general in 2011, she served in various commands at Fort Hood and as chief of staff for communication in the International Security Assistance Force in Afghanistan. In June 2017, she was promoted to lieutenant general and appointed deputy commanding general of United States Army Forces Command (FORSCOM). She served as acting commander of FORSCOM from October 2018 until March 2019 and, on 8 July 2019, became the first woman appointed to command United States Army North. Richardson was nominated as commander of United States Southern Command by President Joe Biden in March 2021 and confirmed in this role by the United States Senate on 11 August. Having been promoted on 18 October 2021, Richardson became the second woman to attain the rank of general in the U.S. Army, as well as the third woman to lead a combatant command.

== Early life ==
The daughter of Suzanne (Allen) Strickland, a teacher and Darwin Jan Strickland, a physician, Richardson grew up in Northglenn, Colorado, where she attended public schools and graduated from Northglenn High School in 1982. She attended Metropolitan State College in Denver, where she earned a Bachelor of Science degree in psychology. She was an All American swimmer and earned her pilot's license at the age of 16. Richardson was commissioned via the Army Reserve Officers' Training Corps program in 1986.

== Junior and field officer career ==
Richardson was commissioned into the United States Army Aviation Branch in 1986 as a second lieutenant. Richardson flew Sikorsky UH-60 Black Hawk helicopters in the 128th Aviation Company (Assault Helicopter). She was promoted to first lieutenant in 1988 and subsequently was administrative officer, executive officer, and platoon leader with 1st Battalion, 501st Aviation Regiment. She transferred to the 17th Aviation Brigade as an assistant logistics officer in 1989 and served in South Korea before returning to the 501st Aviation Regiment as a personnel officer in the 4th Battalion in 1990. Richardson commanded Headquarters and Headquarters Company, 4th Battalion from September 1990 to September 1991, and was promoted to captain in March 1991.

Richardson attended the Aviation Officer Advanced Course at Fort Rucker in 1991–1992 and took command of Company B, 1st Battalion, 158th Aviation Regiment in July 1992. She later served as the battalion's personnel officer (S-1). In 1995–96 she was a trainer in the Battle Command Training Program at Fort Leavenworth before spending a year as a student at the Army Command and General Staff College. Promoted to major in March 1997, Richardson became operations officer and then executive officer of 9th Battalion, 101st Aviation Regiment.

Richardson served as a military aide to Vice President Al Gore between February 1999 and January 2001. That year she was promoted to lieutenant colonel and became deputy operations officer of the 101st Airborne Division (Air Assault). From July 2002 to May 2004 Richardson was commander of 5th Battalion, 101st Aviation Regiment and served with that unit on Operation Iraqi Freedom. During that time, she was featured on the cover of the 24 March 2003 edition of Time magazine. She, her husband, and their daughter were the subjects of a story by Nancy Gibbs entitled "An American Family Goes to War", in which they were described as "...the first husband and wife battalion commanders in the new married-with-children military". She was Army campaign planner with the deputy chief of staff for operations and plans from 2004 to 2006. In 2007, she was awarded a Master of Science degree from the National Defense University's Industrial College of the Armed Forces (now the Dwight D. Eisenhower School for National Security and Resource Strategy) at Fort McNair. Promoted to colonel, she was commander of the Army garrison at Fort Myer until October 2009 when she was assigned as chief of the United States Senate liaison division for the Secretary of the Army.

== General officer ==
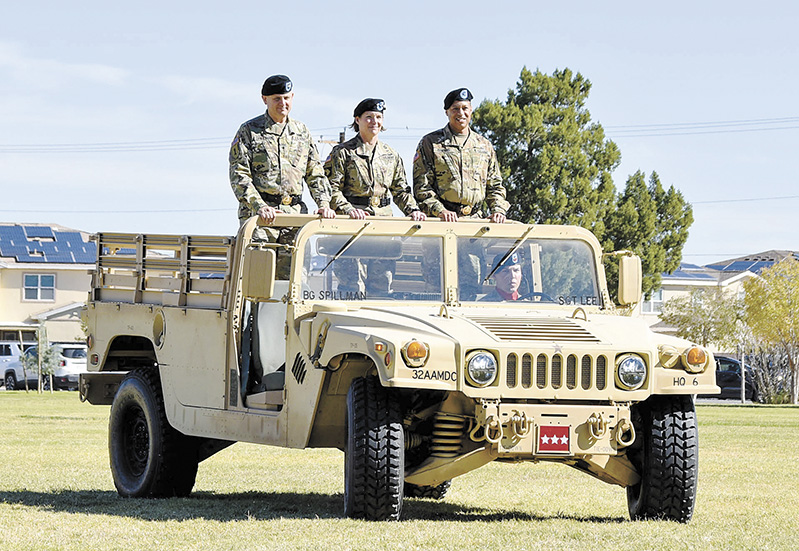
Richardson, Acting Commanding General (CG) of FORSCOM (center), flanked by the outgoing and incoming CGs of 32nd Army Air and Missile Defense Command, review the troops at a change of command ceremony, Fort Bliss, November 2018

In July 2011, Richardson was promoted to brigadier general and appointed commanding general of the Operational Test Command at Fort Hood. She was subsequently appointed deputy commanding general – support for the 1st Cavalry Division at Fort Hood, a position she left in 2013 to become deputy chief of staff, communication for the International Security Assistance Force in Afghanistan. Richardson returned to the United States after a year and became chief legislative liaison to the Office of the Secretary of the Army as a major general.

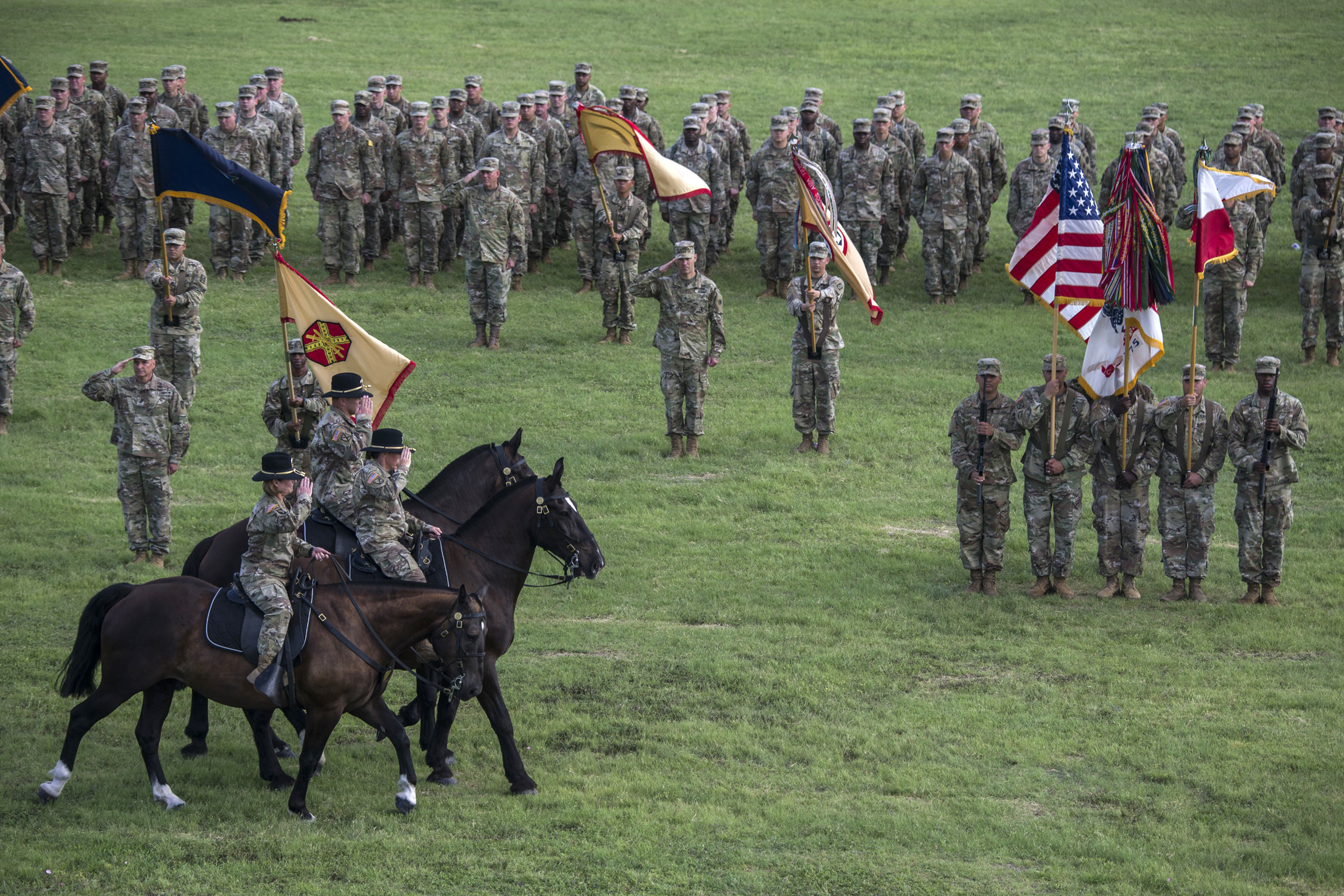
Richardson, incoming CG of ARNORTH, troops the line at a change of command ceremony, Fort Sam Houston, 8 July 2019

In June 2017, Richardson was promoted to lieutenant general and appointed deputy commander of United States Army Forces Command (FORSCOM), replacing Lieutenant General Patrick J. Donahue II, who was retiring. She was appointed by FORSCOM commander General Robert B. Abrams who said the decision took "less than a second". This was despite never having worked with Richardson; Abrams said "I know her reputation. I’ve seen her work... She’s the exact right leader at the exact right time". Her appointment was confirmed by the U.S. Senate and she became the first woman to hold the position officially (Major General Jody J. Daniels had acted as deputy for the week prior to Richardson's appointment). FORSCOM is the largest command in the U.S. Army, representing 770,000 soldiers and civilians including 200,000 regular army soldiers stationed in the United States and the entire National Guard and Army Reserve. In October 2018, Abrams left FORSCOM for a new assignment, and Richardson was named acting commander, the first woman to head the organization. In announcing the appointment, Army Chief of Staff Mark Milley indicated that Richardson could expect to be the acting commander for several months, and was being considered for permanent assignment to the post. She continued to serve as acting commander until General Michael X. Garrett assumed command in March 2019.

=== Commander of U.S. Army North ===
In April, Richardson was nominated to be the first female commander of United States Army North. She assumed command of ARNORTH/5th Army on 8 July 2019.

During Richardson's tenure, ARNORTH supported the Operation Allies Welcome Afghan evacuee mission. ARNORTH also participated in the federal government's response to the COVID-19 pandemic, as well as natural disaster relief including wildland firefighting operations in Northern California.

=== Commander of U.S. Southern Command ===
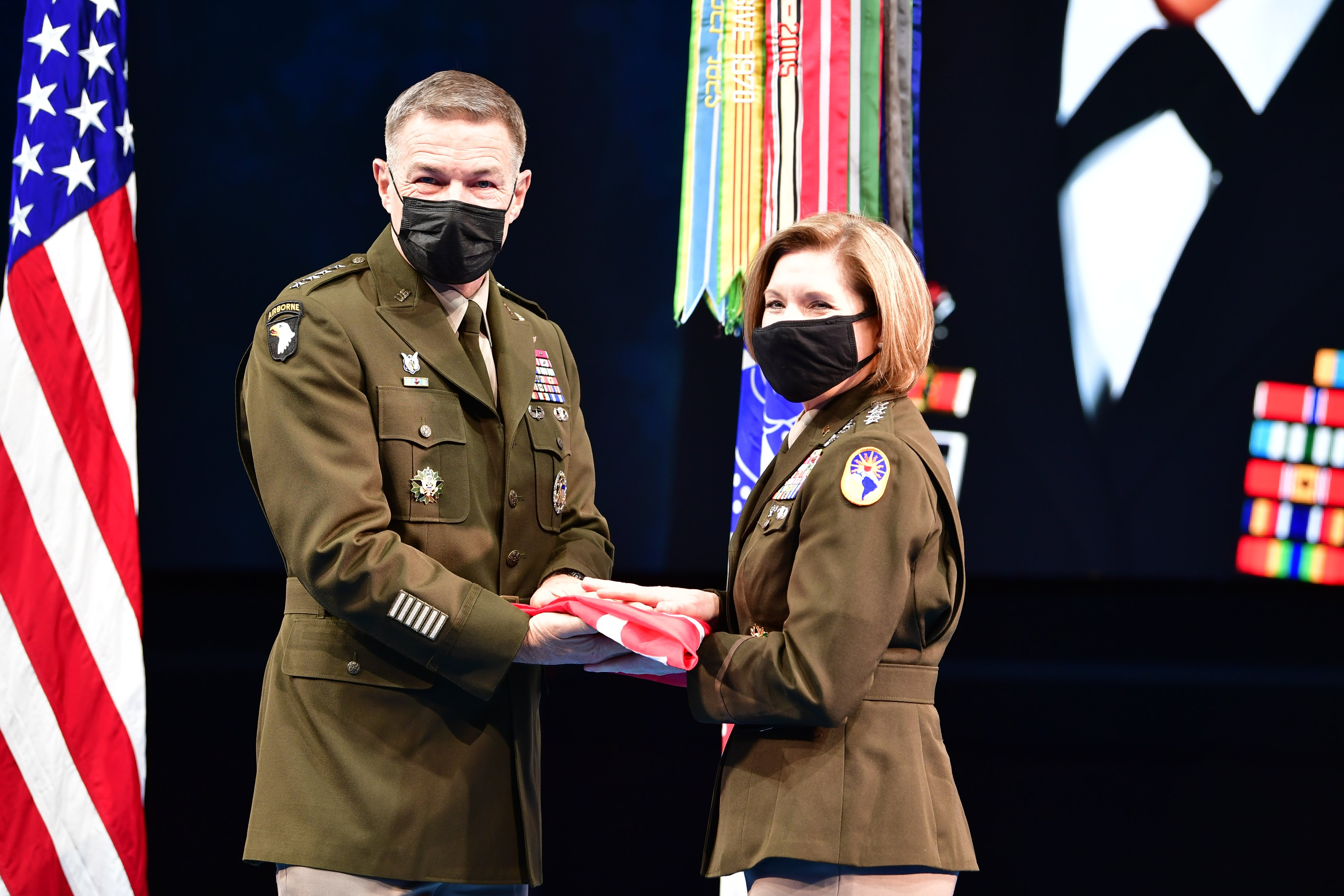
Richardson is presented her four-star flag by Army chief of staff General James C. McConville at her promotion ceremony, 18 October 2021

On 6 March 2021, Defense Secretary Lloyd Austin announced that President Biden nominated Richardson to become commander of the United States Southern Command. Her nomination was sent to the Senate on 5 March 2021, with hearings held on 3 August 2021. Richardson was originally going to be recommended by then-Defense Secretary Mark Esper and Chairman of the Joint Chiefs of Staff Mark Milley, but they delayed until after the 2020 United States presidential election over concern that then-President Donald Trump might react negatively to the nomination of a woman to a top command.

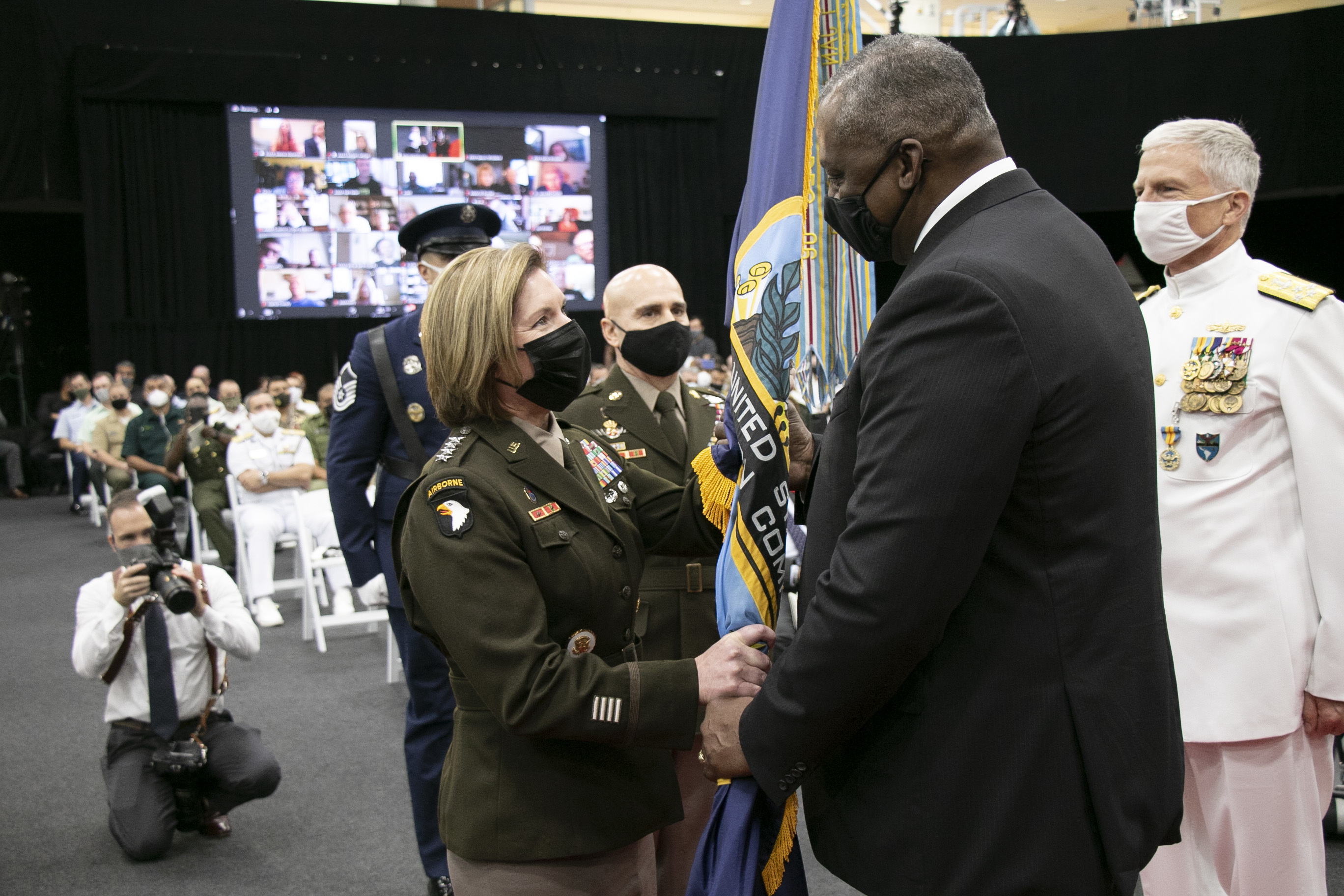
Richardson assumes command of SOUTHCOM from Secretary of Defense Lloyd Austin on 29 October 2021

At her nomination hearing, Richardson stated her commitment to strengthening SOUTHCOM's approach to security cooperation and ensuring the United States remained the partner of choice in the region, as well as ensuring SOUTHCOM played its part in supporting the "whole-of-government" effort to distribute COVID-19 vaccines to partner nations. She added that she would focus on expanding the command's security cooperation efforts and multilateral exercises, prioritize international military education and training exchanges, and continue to work with Congress and the Department of Defense to increase interoperability levels and global integration. She was confirmed by unanimous voice vote on 11 August 2021.

Richardson relinquished command of ARNORTH to John R. Evans Jr. on 9 September 2021. She received her fourth star as the third woman to lead a combatant command, with the promotion ceremony held on 18 October 2021. Her four-star rank was pinned by the Chief of Staff of the United States Army, General James C. McConville and her husband, Lieutenant General James M. Richardson.

The change of command ceremony took place on 29 October 2021, with her predecessor, Admiral Craig S. Faller, retiring after 38 years service.

At the Aspen Security Forum in Colorado, on 20 July 2022, Richardson spoke about a "South blindness" and described the importance of the 31 nations that make up her command:

"...our competitors know that, our adversaries know that...this region is so rich in resources it's off the charts rich and they have a lot to be proud of, and our competitors and adversaries also know how rich in the resources that this region is. 60% of the world's lithium is in the region, you have heavy crude, you have light sweet crude, you have rare earth elements, you have the Amazon which is called the lungs of the world, you have the 31% of the world's fresh water here in this region, and there are adversaries that are taking advantage of this region every single day right in our neighborhood, and I just look at what happens in this region in terms of security impacts our security our national security in the homeland and in the United States..."

— Laura Richardson

== Personal life ==
Richardson is married to retired Lieutenant General James M. Richardson, who was deputy commander for combat development at the Army Futures Command. They have one daughter.

== Awards and decorations ==
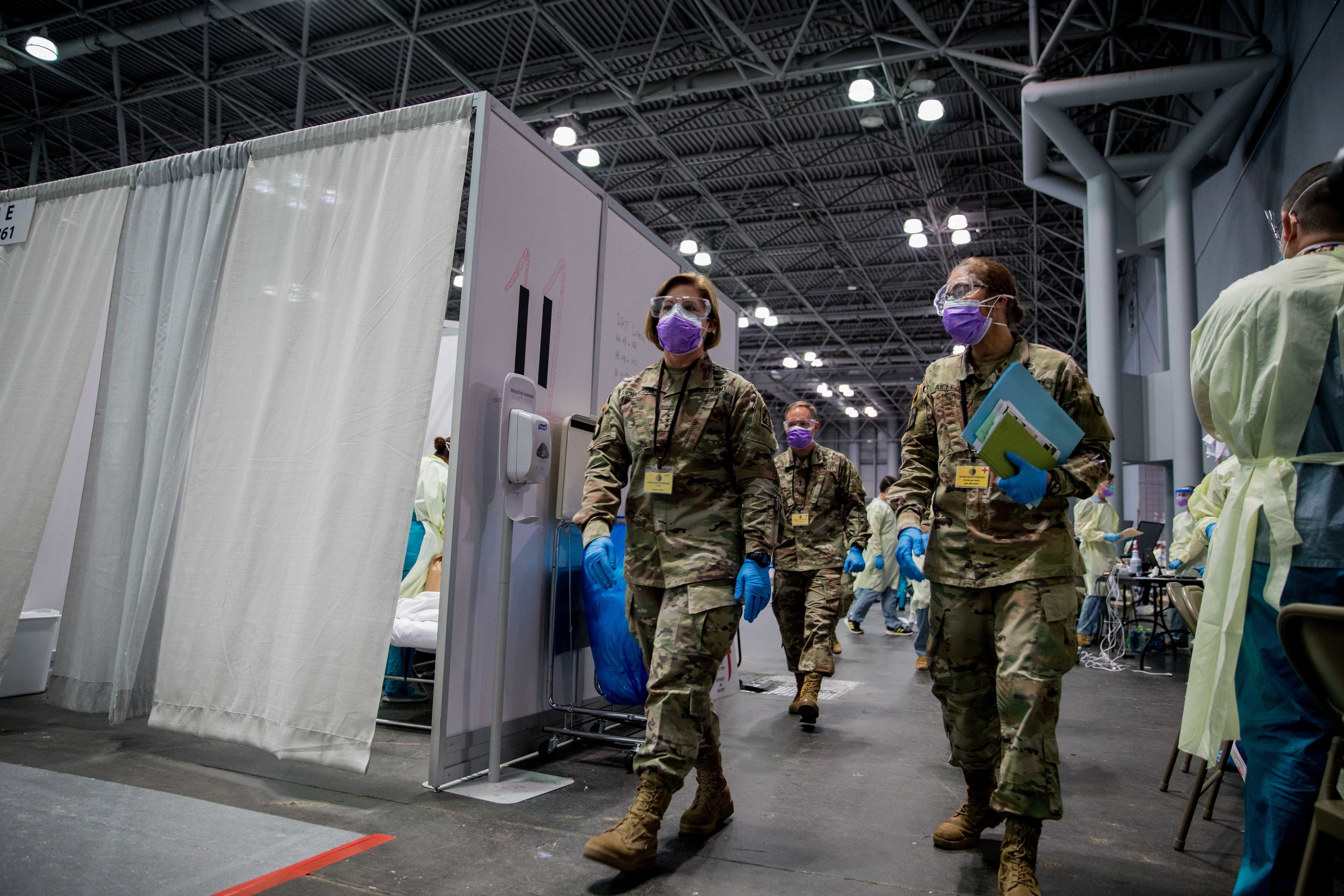
LTG Laura Richardson receives a tour of Javits New York Medical Station, 12 April 2020, by 44th Medical Brigade Commanding Officer Army Col. Kimberlee Aiello, right, during the COVID-19 pandemic

As listed by U.S. Army datasheet:

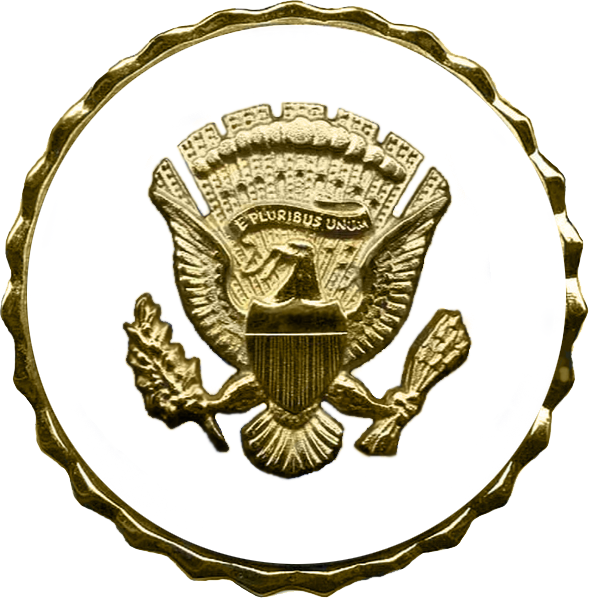
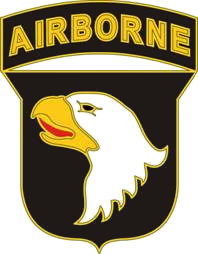
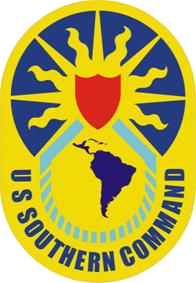
Combat Action Badge
Senior Army Aviator Badge
Air Assault Badge
Basic Parachutist Badge
Army Staff Identification Badge
Vice Presidential Service Badge
101st Airborne Division Shoulder Sleeve Insignia for Former Wartime Service
United States Southern Command Distinctive Unit Insignia
4 Overseas Service Bars

Defense Distinguished Service Medal
Army Distinguished Service Medal with one bronze oak leaf cluster
Defense Superior Service Medal
Legion of Merit with two oak leaf clusters
Bronze Star Medal
Meritorious Service Medal with three oak leaf clusters
Air Medal with bronze award numeral 7
Joint Service Commendation Medal
Army Commendation Medal with oak leaf cluster
Army Achievement Medal with two oak leaf clusters
Meritorious Unit Commendation with two oak leaf clusters
Superior Unit Award with oak leaf cluster
National Defense Service Medal with one bronze service star
Afghanistan Campaign Medal
Iraq Campaign Medal with service star
Global War on Terrorism Expeditionary Medal
Global War on Terrorism Service Medal
Korea Defense Service Medal
Armed Forces Service Medal with service star
Humanitarian Service Medal
Army Service Ribbon
Army Overseas Service Ribbon with award numeral 5
NATO Medal for service with ISAF

Military offices
Preceded by Patrick J. Donahue II	Deputy Commander of United States Army Forces Command; 2017–2019	Succeeded by Leopoldo A. Quintas
Preceded by Jeffrey S. Buchanan	Commander of United States Army North; 2019–2021	Succeeded by John R. Evans Jr.
Preceded by Craig S. Faller	Commander of United States Southern Command; 2021–2024	Succeeded by Alvin Holsey
