= Richard R. Coffman =

U.S. Army general

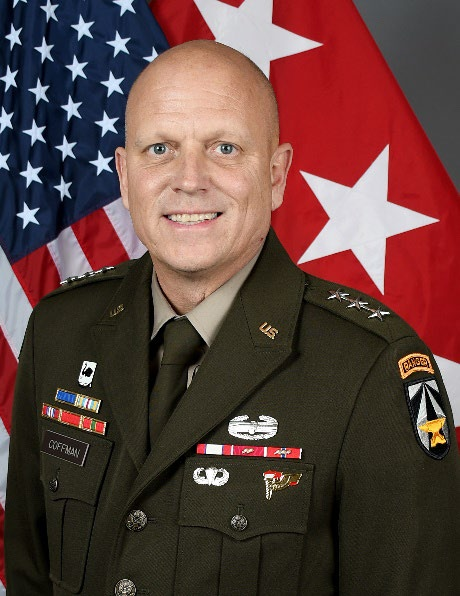
- Official portrait, 2022
- Education: Harvard University; Embry Riddle University; Centre College
- Spouse: Jacqui Coffman
- Military career
- Allegiance: United States of America
- Branch: United States Army
- Service years: 1989–2024
- Rank: Lieutenant General
- Nickname: Ross
- Commands: Next Generation Combat Vehicle Cross Functional Team, 1st BCT, 1st Armored Division, 1st Battalion, 64th Armored Regiment
- Conflicts: Iraq War, Desert Storm

Richard "Ross" Coffman is a retired United States Army lieutenant general who last served as the deputy commanding general for combat development of United States Army Futures Command from 2022 to 2024. He previously served as director of the Next Generation Combat Vehicle Cross Functional Team from August 2018 to August 2022. Coffman attended Harvard University, Embry Riddle University, and Centre College.

== Early life ==
LTG Ross Coffman was commissioned by the University of Kentucky's ROTC program as a lieutenant in the Armor branch following his graduation from Centre College (Danville, KY) in 1989. During his more than 30-year career he has served at the tactical, operational and strategic levels in the United States and overseas.

Before being selected as the deputy commanding general of the U.S. Army Futures Command, LTG Coffman was the director of the Next Generation Combat Vehicles Cross Functional Team, one of eight new Army units responsible for closing capability gaps in the Army's top transformation priorities. LTG Coffman also served in Eastern Europe as the deputy commanding general for maneuver in the 1st Infantry Division, a historic Army formation known as “The Big Red One.” He is proud to have served throughout his career in units that were awarded the Presidential Unit Citation, the Valorous Unit Award, the Joint Meritorious Unit Citation, the Meritorious Unit Citation, and the Superior Unit Award. He has led Army efforts in Saudi Arabia, Bosnia, Europe, Haiti, Kuwait, Iraq, and the U.S.

== Civilian Education ==
- Bachelor's degree in Economics and Government from Centre College.
- Master in Business Administration from Embry Riddle University.
- Graduate Fellowship, Harvard Kennedy School.

== Military Education ==
- Armor Officer Basic and Advanced Courses.
- United States Army Command and General Staff College.
- Joint and Combined Warfighting School.

== Publications and Media by Richard R. Coffman ==
Coffman has published many videos and articles about his lessons in leadership throughout his career in the U.S. Army, including what impacts effective leadership, the importance of a human connection, team collaboration, and demonstrating care to enable collective success.

- Lessons in Leadership with Major General Ross Coffman. Detroit Regional Chamber, April 26, 2021. By MG Ross Coffman. Lessons in Leadership with Maj. Gen. Ross Coffman (detroitchamber.com)
- The Silver Bullet of Leadership. The Strategy Bridge, April 9, 2016. By MG Ross Coffman. The Silver Bullet of #Leadership (thestrategybridge.org)
- US Army’s Coffman on Next-Generation Combat Vehicles, Autonomy, New Technologies. Defense & Aerospace Report, October 15, 2019. US Army’s Coffman on Next-Generation Combat Vehicles, Autonomy, New Technologies - YouTube
- READY 6 Podcast #2.1: Mission Command. Ready 6 Podcast, 1st Brigade, 1st Armored Division, November 14, 2014. By COL Ross Coffman. Ready First Podcast - Facebook (facebook.com)

Military offices
| Preceded by Scott L. Efflandt | Deputy Commanding General (Maneuver) of the 1st Infantry Division; 2017–2018 | Succeeded by Winston P. Brooks |
| New office | Director of the Next Generation Combat Vehicle Cross Functional Team; 2018–2022 | Succeeded by Geoffrey A. Norman |
| Preceded by James M. Richardson | Deputy Commanding General for Combat Development of the United States Army Futures Command; 2022–2024 | Succeeded by Edmond Brown |
