= Craig S. Faller =

United States Navy admiral

Admiral Craig S. Faller
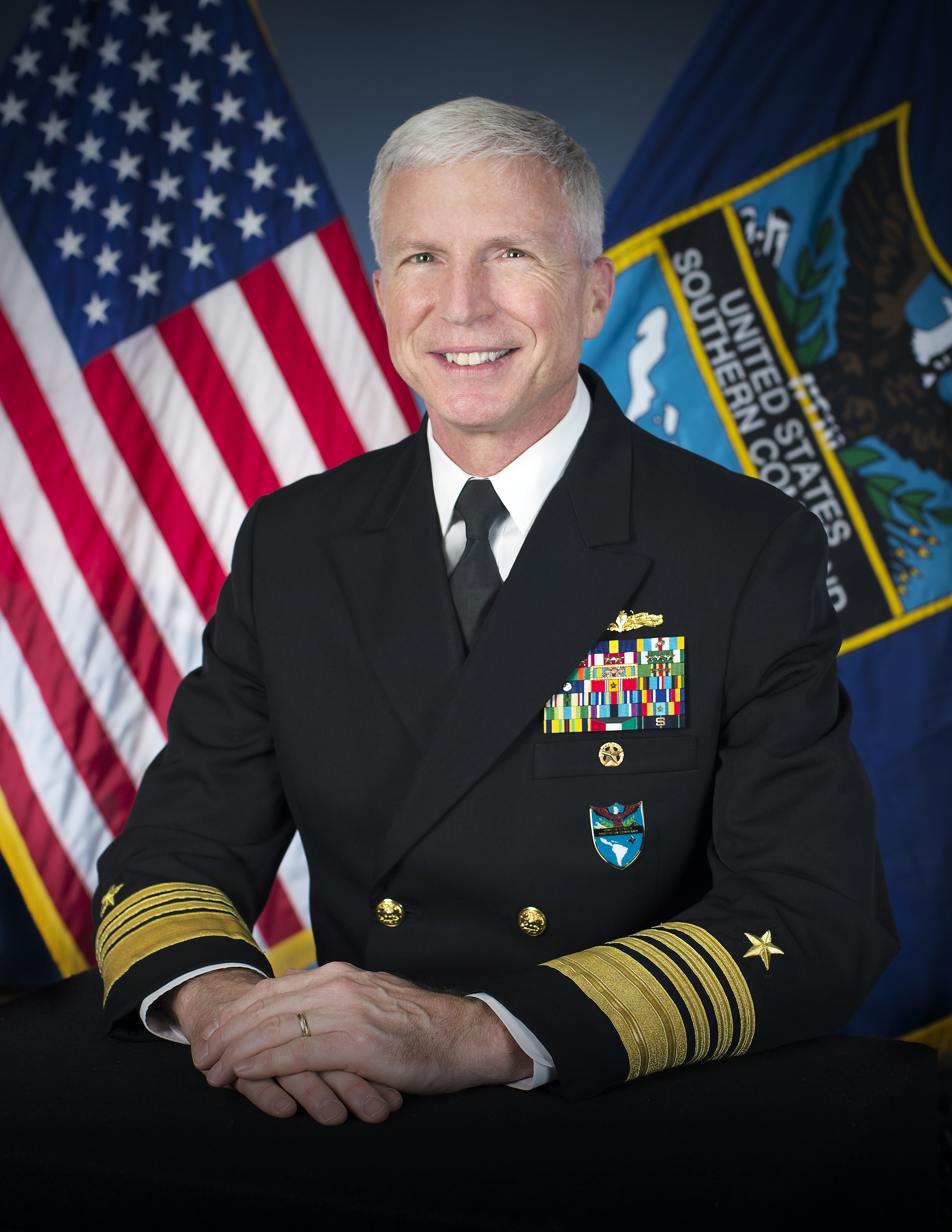
- Admiral Craig S. Faller in 2018
- Born: 1961 (age 64–65); Fryburg, Pennsylvania, U.S.
- Military career
- Allegiance: United States
- Branch: United States Navy
- Service years: 1983–2021
- Rank: Admiral
- Nickname: Dadmiral
- Commands: United States Southern Command; Carrier Strike Group 3 USS Shiloh (CG 67); USS Stethem (DDG 63)
- Conflicts: Gulf War
- Awards: Defense Distinguished Service Medal (2); Navy Distinguished Service Medal; Defense Superior Service Medal (2); Legion of Merit (5)

Craig Stephen Faller (born 1961) is a retired United States Navy admiral. A 1983 graduate of the United States Naval Academy and a native of Fryburg, Pennsylvania, he earned a Bachelor of Science in Systems Engineering. He earned his master's in national security affairs (strategic planning) from the Naval Postgraduate School in 1990.

Faller assumed duty as senior military assistant to the secretary of defense in January 2017. In that position, he served as the principal military advisor and assistant to the secretary of defense. On November 26, 2018, he succeeded Admiral Kurt W. Tidd as commander of United States Southern Command.

== Naval career ==
At sea, Faller served as reactor electrical division officer, electrical officer, and reactor training assistant aboard USS South Carolina (CGN-37); operations officer aboard USS Peterson (DD-969); station officer aboard USS Enterprise (CVN-65), and executive officer of USS John Hancock (DD-981). As commanding officer of USS Stethem, he deployed to the Persian Gulf and participated in maritime interception operations in support of United Nations sanctions against Iraq. During his tour as commanding officer of USS Shiloh (CG-67), he assisted victims of the devastating tsunami off Indonesia. Finally, as commander, Carrier Strike Group 3, he deployed to the Middle East, supporting Operations New Dawn (Iraq) and Enduring Freedom (Afghanistan).

Ashore, Faller was assigned to chief of legislative affairs for the Secretary of the Navy; served as Deputy Chief of Naval Operations (Plans, Policy and Operations); served as a legislative fellow on the staff of Senator Edward M. Kennedy. Ashore also served as head of Surface Nuclear Officer Programs and Placement at Navy Personnel Command and served as executive assistant to the Chief of naval operations. Finally, he served as commander, Navy Recruiting Command; as executive assistant to the commander, United States Pacific Command and commander, United States Central Command; and as Director of Operations, United States Central Command.

He retired from active duty on October 29, 2021, relinquishing command of SOUTHCOM to General Laura J. Richardson.

== Awards and decorations ==

Surface Warfare Officer Pin
Defense Distinguished Service Medal with one bronze oak leaf cluster	Navy Distinguished Service Medal	Defense Superior Service Medal with oak leaf cluster
Legion of Merit with four gold award stars	Meritorious Service Medal with two award stars	Navy and Marine Corps Commendation Medal with three award stars
Navy and Marine Corps Achievement Medal	Joint Meritorious Unit Award with three oak leaf clusters	Navy Meritorious Unit Commendation with three bronze service stars
Navy "E" Ribbon w/ Wreathed Battle E device	National Defense Service Medal with service star	Armed Forces Expeditionary Medal
Southwest Asia Service Medal with service star	Global War on Terrorism Expeditionary Medal	Global War on Terrorism Service Medal
Armed Forces Service Medal	Humanitarian Service Medal	Navy Sea Service Deployment Ribbon with silver service star
Navy Recruiting Service Ribbon	Order of Naval Merit Admiral Padilla, Grand Cross (Colombia)	Military Medal for Distinguished Service, Grand Cross (Colombia)
Unidentified Medal (Colombia)	Kuwait Liberation Medal (Kuwait)	Navy Rifle Sharpshooter Ribbon
Command at Sea insignia
United States Southern Command Badge

- Admiral Faller also received the Navy Recruiter Badge with gold wreath.
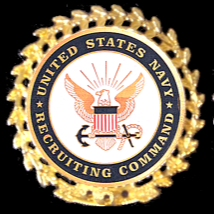

Military offices
Preceded by Joseph P. Aucoin	Commander of Carrier Strike Group 3; 2011–2012	Succeeded by Charles M. Gaouette
Preceded by ???	Director of Operations of the United States Central Command; 201?–2014	Succeeded by Kenneth S. Wilsbach
Preceded by ???	Chief of Legislative Affairs of the United States Navy; 2014–2017	Succeeded by James T. Loeblein
Preceded by Eric M. Smith	Senior Military Assistant to the Secretary of Defense; 2017–2018	Succeeded by George W. Smith Jr.
Preceded by Kurt W. Tidd	Commander of United States Southern Command; 2018–2021	Succeeded by Laura J. Richardson
