= James M. Richardson (general) =

US Army general

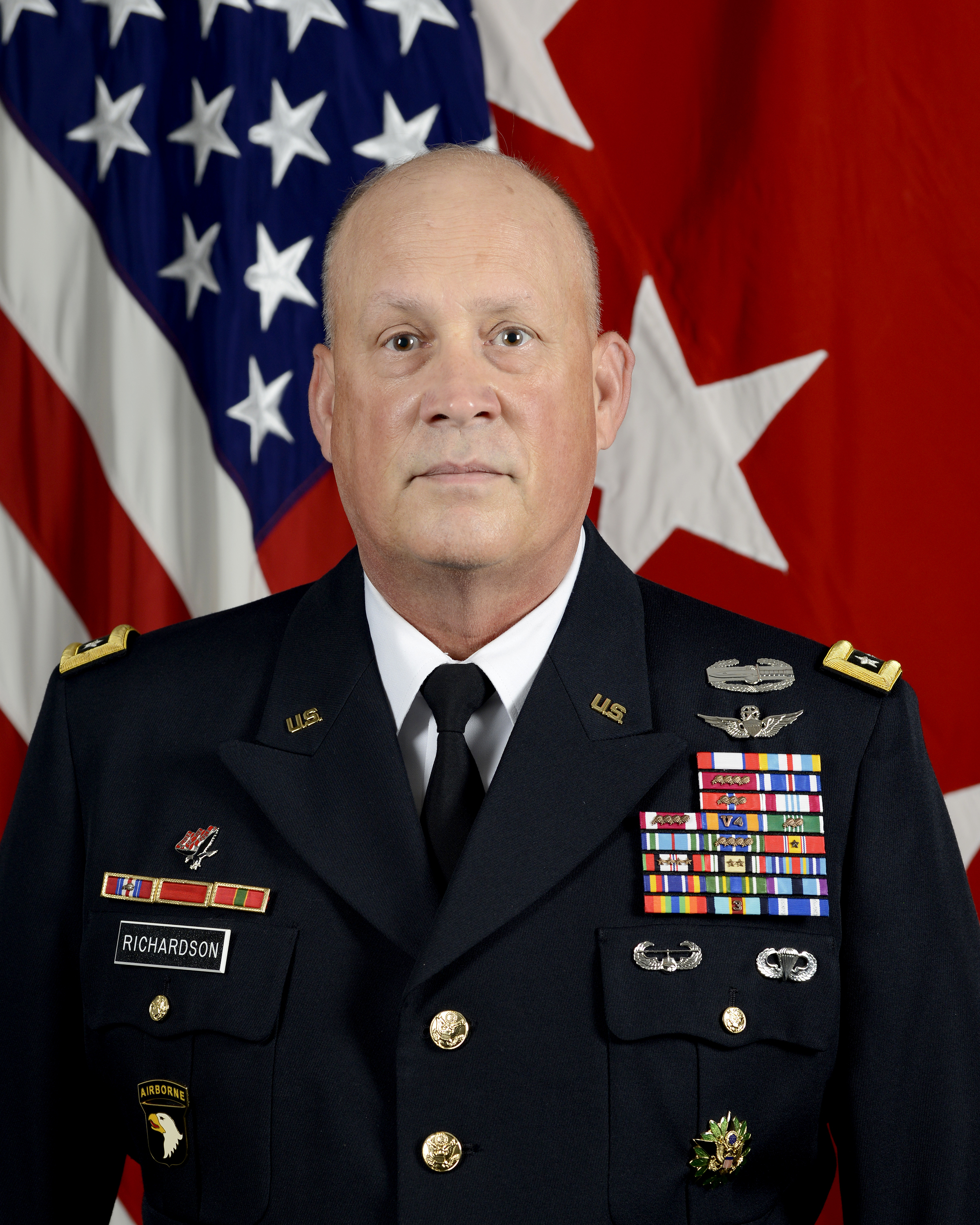
- Richardson in 2018
- Born: 1960 (age 65–66); Myrtle Beach, South Carolina, U.S.
- Spouse: General Laura J. Richardson
- Military career
- Allegiance: United States
- Branch: United States Army
- Service years: 1983–2022
- Rank: Lieutenant General
- Commands: Army Futures Command (Acting); United States Army Aviation and Missile Command; 101st Combat Aviation Brigade
- Conflicts: War in Afghanistan; Iraq War
- Awards: Army Distinguished Service Medal; Defense Superior Service Medal; Legion of Merit (5); Distinguished Flying Cross; Bronze Star Medal (4)

James M. Richardson (born 1960) is a retired United States Army lieutenant general who last served as Deputy Commanding General for Combat Development of the United States Army Futures Command from 2018 to 2022, as well as the Acting Commander of Futures Command from 2021 to 2022. He was commissioned in 1983, through ROTC at the University of South Carolina. He is married to General Laura J. Richardson.

== Later career ==
A leader in new combat technologies, Richardson has been a speaker on these topics at defense and academic symposia including the annual Space & Missile Defense Symposium.

== Awards and decorations ==
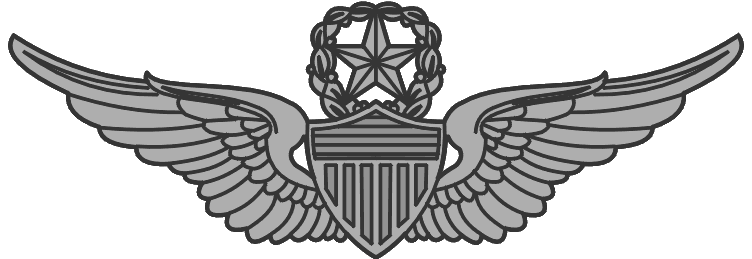
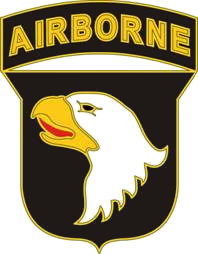
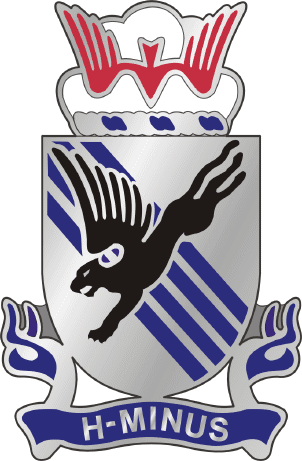
Combat Action Badge
Master Army Aviator Badge
Air Assault Badge
Basic Parachutist Badge
Army Staff Identification Badge
101st Airborne Division Combat Service Identification Badge
505th Infantry Regiment Distinctive Unit Insignia
12 Overseas Service Bars

Army Distinguished Service Medal
Defense Superior Service Medal
Legion of Merit with four bronze oak leaf clusters
Distinguished Flying Cross
Bronze Star Medal with three oak leaf clusters
Defense Meritorious Service Medal
Meritorious Service Medal with four oak leaf clusters
Air Medal with "V" device and bronze award numeral 4
Army Commendation Medal with two oak leaf clusters
Joint Service Achievement Medal
Army Achievement Medal with four oak leaf clusters
Valorous Unit Award with oak leaf cluster
Meritorious Unit Commendation
Superior Unit Award
National Defense Service Medal with one bronze service star
Afghanistan Campaign Medal with four service stars
Iraq Campaign Medal with two service stars
Global War on Terrorism Expeditionary Medal
Global War on Terrorism Service Medal
Korea Defense Service Medal
Humanitarian Service Medal
Army Service Ribbon
Army Overseas Service Ribbon with award numeral 3
NATO Medal for service with ISAF

Military offices
Preceded by Joseph P. DiSalvo	Deputy Commanding General of the III Corps and Fort Hood; 2012–2014	Succeeded by Kendall P. Cox
Preceded by Lynn A. Collyar	Commanding General of the United States Army Aviation and Missile Command; 2014–2016	Succeeded by Douglas Gabram
New office	Deputy Commanding General for Combat Development of the United States Army Futures Command; 2018–2022	Succeeded by Richard R. Coffman
Preceded by John M. Murray	Commanding General of the United States Army Futures Command; Acting; 2021–2022	Succeeded by James E. Rainey
