= Command systems in the United States Army =

Software system development

Command systems in the United States Army refers to electronic command systems implemented by the US Army to carry out important central functions to operation of its units and major commands.

The Semi-Automatic Ground Environment and Missile Master systems were used by Army Air Defence Command from the 1960s.

The Integrated Air & Missiles Defense Battle Command System (IBCS) is a new command system which is being developed for future use by Army combat units.

The United States Army Futures Command has teams that manage a variety of central functions, such as networking, aviation, long-range artillery, and unit navigation methods. The new Army Applications Lab in Austin, Texas, is delving into various forms of disruptive technology, for future combat.

== See also ==
- United States Army
- Command and Control
