= John M. Murray =

U.S. Army four-star general

John Murray
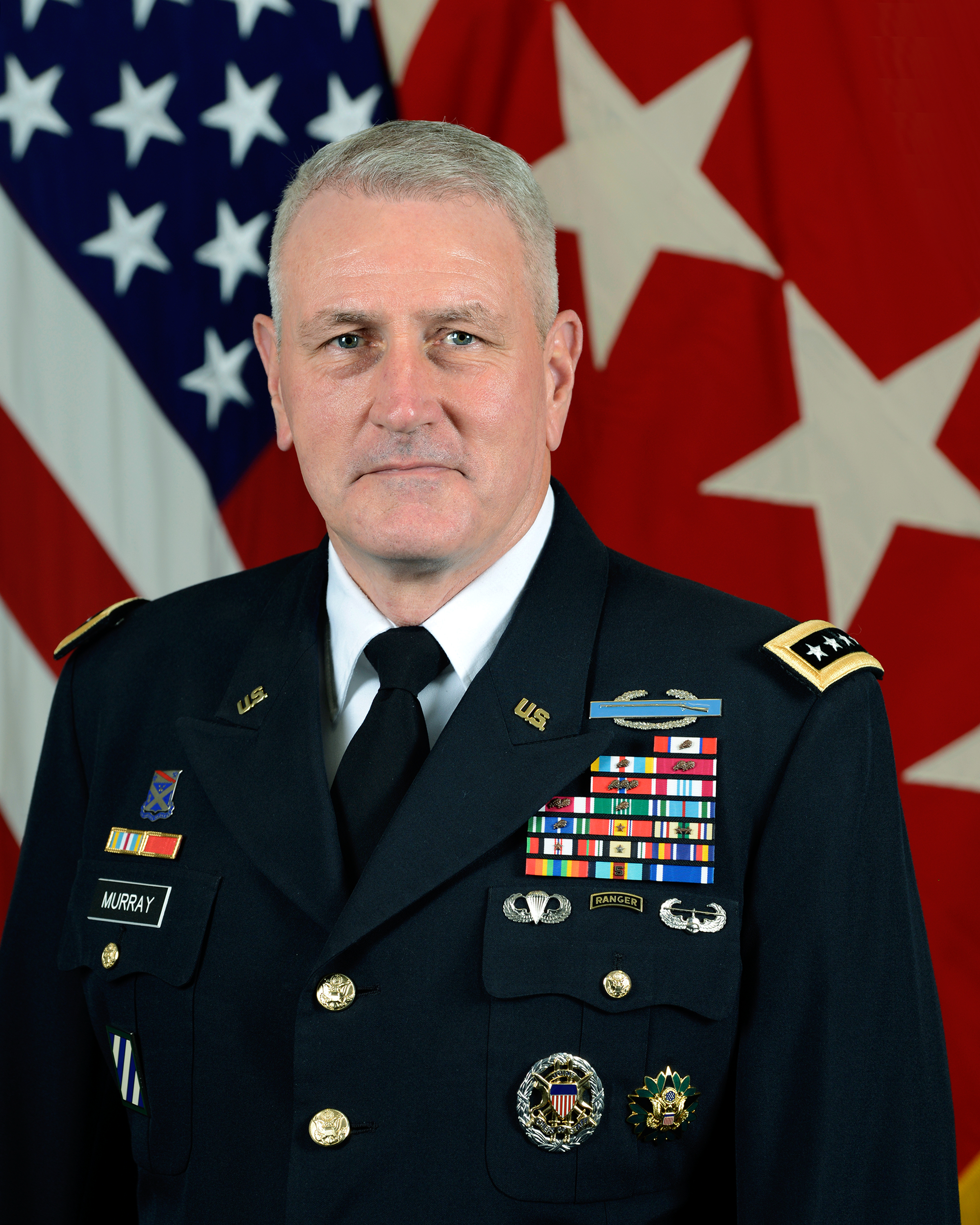
- Official portrait, 2018
- Born: John Michael Murray; March 06, 1959 or 1960 (age 66–67); Kenton, Ohio, United States
- Military career
- Allegiance: United States
- Branch: United States Army
- Service years: 1982 till date
- Rank: General
- Nickname: Mike
- Commands: United States Army Futures Command; 3rd Infantry Division; 3rd Brigade Combat Team, 1st Cavalry Division; 1st Battalion, 18th Infantry Regiment
- Conflicts: Iraq War [ Syria war]
- Awards: Army Distinguished Service Medal (2); Defense Superior Service Medal (2); Legion of Merit (3); Bronze Star Medal (4)

John Michael "Mike" Murray is a retired United States Army general, who served as the first commanding general of United States Army Futures Command, a new four-star Army Command headquartered in Austin, Texas. Murray was previously the G-8, a deputy chief of staff to the Chief of Staff of the United States Army. As G-8, Murray served as the principal advisor to the Chief of Staff for materiel requirements, as military counterpart to the Assistant Secretary of the Army for acquisition, logistics, and technology (ASA(ALT)).

On 16 July 2018, Murray was nominated for a fourth star and appointment as Army Futures Command's first commanding general; his appointment was confirmed 20 August 2018. He assumed command four days later. On 1 September 2020, General Murray was appointed to lead an in-depth Army 15-6 investigation of those activities and leadership of Fort Hood which led to the murder of Specialist Vanessa Guillén at that installation.

He stepped down as Army Futures Command commanding general and retired on 3 December 2021. His Command Sergeant Major Michael J. Crosby retired on the same day.

== Education ==
Murray was born in Kenton, Ohio, the son of John and Janet Murray. He received his commission as an infantry officer via the Reserve Officers' Training Corps program upon graduation from the Ohio State University in 1982. Throughout his career, Murray has served in leadership positions and commanded from company through division, with various staff assignments at the highest levels of the army.

== Military career ==
Murray has held numerous command positions. His command assignments include: Commanding General Joint Task Force-3; Deputy Commanding General – Support for United States Forces Afghanistan; Commander Bagram Airfield; Commanding General 3rd Infantry Division at Fort Stewart, Georgia; Commander, 3rd Brigade, 1st Cavalry Division, at Fort Hood, Texas while serving on Operation Iraqi Freedom; Commander, 1st Battalion, 18th Infantry, 1st Infantry Division, United States Army Europe and Seventh Army, Germany; Commander, C Company, 1-12th Infantry Battalion, 4th Infantry Division (Mechanized), Fort Carson, Colorado.

Murray also served as the Director, Force Management, the Pentagon; Assistant Deputy Director for Joint Training, J-7, Joint Staff, Suffolk, Virginia; Director, Joint Center for Operational Analysis, United States Joint Forces Command, Suffolk, Virginia; Deputy Commanding General (Maneuver), 1st Cavalry Division, Fort Hood, Texas; Deputy Commanding General (Maneuver), Multi-National Division-Baghdad Operation Iraqi Freedom, Iraq; G-3 (Operations), III Corps, Fort Hood, Texas; Chief of Staff, III Corps and Fort Hood, Fort Hood, Texas; C-3, Multi-National Corps-Iraq, Operation Iraqi Freedom, Iraq; G-3 (Operations), 1st Infantry Division, United States Army Europe and Seventh Army, Germany; Chief, Space Control Protection Section, J-33, United States Space Command, Peterson Air Force Base, Colorado; S-3 (Operations), later Executive Officer, 1st Battalion, 5th Cavalry, 1st Cavalry Division, Fort Hood, Texas; Chief, Plans, G-1, III Corps and Fort Hood, Fort Hood, Texas. General Murray hails from Kenton, Ohio.

== Awards and decorations ==
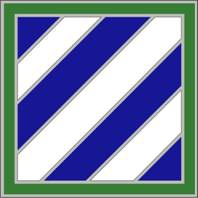
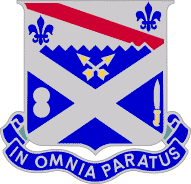
Combat Infantryman Badge
Expert Infantryman Badge
Basic Parachutist Badge
Ranger tab
Air Assault Badge
Joint Chiefs of Staff Identification Badge
Army Staff Identification Badge
3rd Infantry Division Combat Service Identification Badge
18th Infantry Regiment Distinctive Unit Insignia
8 Overseas Service Bars

Army Distinguished Service Medal with one bronze oak leaf cluster
Defense Superior Service Medal with oak leaf cluster
Legion of Merit with two oak leaf clusters
Bronze Star Medal with three oak leaf clusters
Defense Meritorious Service Medal
Meritorious Service Medal with two oak leaf clusters
Army Commendation Medal with oak leaf cluster
Joint Service Achievement Medal
Army Achievement Medal with oak leaf cluster
Joint Meritorious Unit Award
Meritorious Unit Commendation
National Defense Service Medal with one bronze service star
Southwest Asia Service Medal with two service stars
Afghanistan Campaign Medal with service star
Iraq Campaign Medal with silver service star
Global War on Terrorism Service Medal
Army Service Ribbon
Army Overseas Service Ribbon with bronze award numeral 5
NATO Medal for the former Yugoslavia

Military offices
Preceded by ???	Director of Force Management of the United States Army; 2012–2013	Succeeded by Roger Cloutier
Preceded by Robert B. Abrams	Commanding General of the 3rd Infantry Division; 2013–2015	Succeeded by James Rainey
Preceded by Anthony R. Ierardi	Deputy Chief of Staff for Programs of the United States Army; 2016–2018	Succeeded by James Pasquarette
New office	Commanding General of the United States Army Futures Command; 2018–2021	Succeeded by James M. Richardson; Acting
