= United States Army Futures Command =

U.S. Army Command that formerly handled modernization projects

- AFC's shoulder sleeve insignia
- Founded: 24 August 2018
- Disbanded: 2 October 2025
- Country: United States
- Branch: United States Army
- Type: Army command
- Garrison/HQ: Austin, Texas
- Motto: "Forge the future"
- Website: www.army.mil/futures at the Wayback Machine (September 2025) armyfuturescommand.com at the Wayback Machine (August 2022)

Insignia
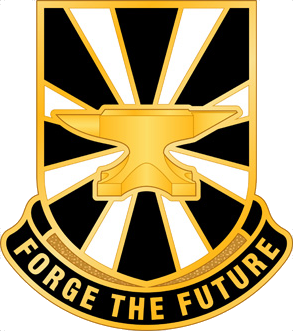
- Distinctive unit insignia

- Beret flash

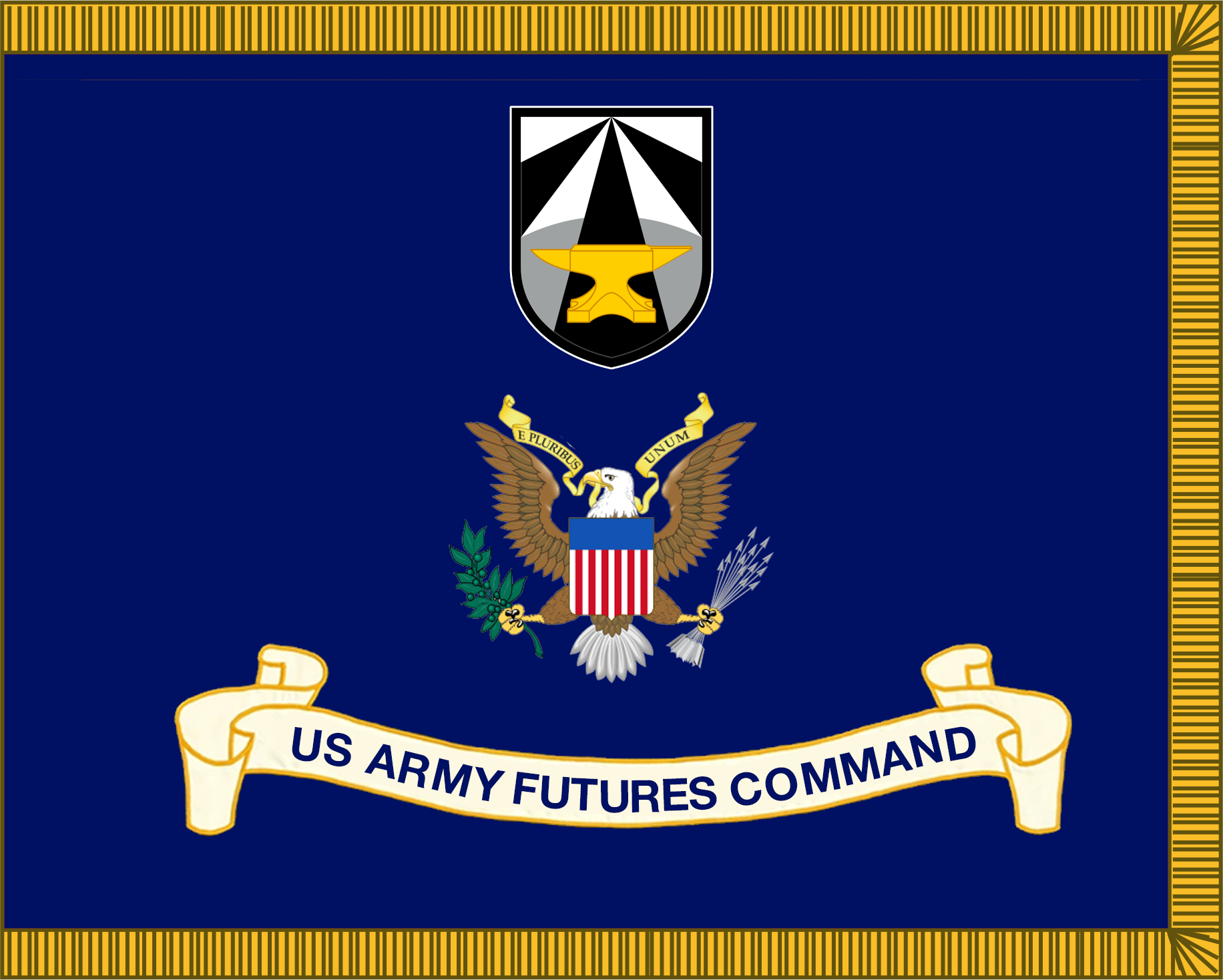
- US Army Futures Command Flag

The United States Army Futures Command (AFC) was a United States Army command that ran modernization projects. (Note: The CG,AFC is responsible for Force design (in the style of TRADOC's G357, but applied to Force modernization, rather than training). The Army's Force management model begins with a projection of the Future operating environment, in terms of resources: political, military, economic, social, information, infrastructure, physical environment, and the time available to bring the Current army to bear on the situation. The AROC serves as a discussion forum of these factors.: The Army G-8 and G-3/5/7 sit on the Army Requirements Oversight Council (AROC), chaired by the Chief of Staff of the Army (CSA).; The relevant strategy is provided by the Army's leadership to guide Army staff.; The resources are "dictated by Congress".; A DOTMLPF analysis models the factors necessary to change the Current force into a relevant Future force.; A JCIDS/ACIDS process identifies the gaps in capability between Current and Future force.; A Force design to meet the materiel gaps is underway.; An organization with the desired capabilities (manpower, materiel, training) is brought to bear on each gap.; AR 5-22(pdf) lists the Force modernization proponent for each Army branch, which can be a CoE or Branch proponent leader.; Staff uses Synchronization meetings before seeking approval —HTAR Force Management 3-2b: "Managing change in any large, complex organization requires the synchronization of many interrelated processes".; A budget request is submitted to Congress.; Approved requests then await resource deliveries which then become available to the combatant commanders.) It was headquartered in Austin, Texas.

The AFC began initial operations on 1 July 2018. It was created as a peer of Forces Command (FORSCOM), Training and Doctrine Command (TRADOC), and Army Materiel Command (AMC). While the other commands focus on readiness to "fight tonight", AFC aimed to improve future readiness for competition with near-peers. The AFC commander functioned as the Army's chief modernization investment officer. (Note: Sydney J. Freedberg Jr. Army Applications Lab: (23 October 2018) Army Futures Command Wants YOU (To Innovate): —Adam Jay Harrison's list for types of Funding Authority) It was supported by the United States Army Reserve Innovation Command (75th Innovation Command).

On October 2nd, 2025, Army officials inactivated the Army Futures Command and activated the U.S. Army Transformation and Training Command (T2COM). This effectively merged AFC with Training and Doctrine Command. The Army will retain AFC's headquarters to serve as the new headquarters for T2COM.

== History ==
=== 2018 ===
Between 1995 and 2009, the Army spent $32 billion on programs such as the Future Combat System that were later cancelled with no harvestable content. As of 2021, the Army had not fielded a new combat system in decades.

Army Futures Command was established in 2018 by Army Secretary Mark Esper to improve Army acquisition by creating better requirements and reducing the time to develop a system to meet them. Leaders who helped form the command include General Mark Milley, then Army Chief of Staff, and Under Secretary of the Army Ryan McCarthy. Its first commander was General John Murray, formerly the Army's G-8.

Over his tenure as Army Secretary, Esper led a process known as "night court", working with other top service officials, to free up and shift billions of dollars into modernization programs and based the new command in Austin, Texas, an area known for its innovative, technology-focused workforce. The Army gave the command's chief and the leaders of new groups, dubbed "§ cross-functional teams", the authority to manage requirements and the leeway to direct dollars.

At its founding, Futures Command was focused on six priorities: (Note: The capabilities as prioritized by the Chief of Staff, will use subject-matter experts (SMEs) in the realms of requirements, acquisition, science and technology, test, resourcing, costing, and sustainment, using CFTs for: 1. Improved long-range precision fires (artillery):—(Fort Sill, Oklahoma) Lead: BG John Rafferty ... PEO Ammunition (AMMO); 2. Next Generation Combat Vehicle—(Detroit Arsenal, Warren, Michigan) Lead: BG Geoffrey Norman ... PEO Ground Combat Systems (GCS); 3. Vertical lift platforms—(Redstone Arsenal, Huntsville, Alabama) Lead: BG Wally Rugen ... PEO Aviation (AVN); 4. Mobile and expeditionary (usable in ground combat) communications network (Aberdeen Proving Ground, Maryland); 1. Network Command, Control, Communications and Intelligence—Lead: BG Jeth Rey ... PEO Command Control Communications Tactical (C3T); 2. Assured Position Navigation and Timing—(Redstone Arsenal, Huntsville, Alabama) Lead: William B. Nelson, SES; 5. Air and missile defense—(Fort Sill, Oklahoma) Lead: BG Brian Gibson, ... PEO Missiles and Space (M&S); 6. Soldier lethality; 1. Soldier Lethality—(Fort Benning, Georgia) Lead: BG Larry Q. Burris, Jr. ... PEO Soldier; 2. Synthetic Training Environment—(Orlando, Florida) Lead: BG William Glaser ... PEO Simulation, Training, & Instrumentation (STRI); 7. Contested logistics—(Huntsville, Alabama) Lead: Army Materiel Command (AMC) stood up in 2023; Above, 'dotted line' relationship (i.e., coordination) is denoted by a ' ... ') Long-range precision fires, Next Generation Combat Vehicle, Future Vertical Lift platforms, a mobile & expeditionary Army network, air and missile defense capabilities, and soldier lethality.

Murray announced plans to stand up an Army Applications Lab to accelerate acquisition and deployment of materiel to the soldiers, including by using artificial intelligence (AI).

Murray also said he would hire a chief technology officer for AFC.

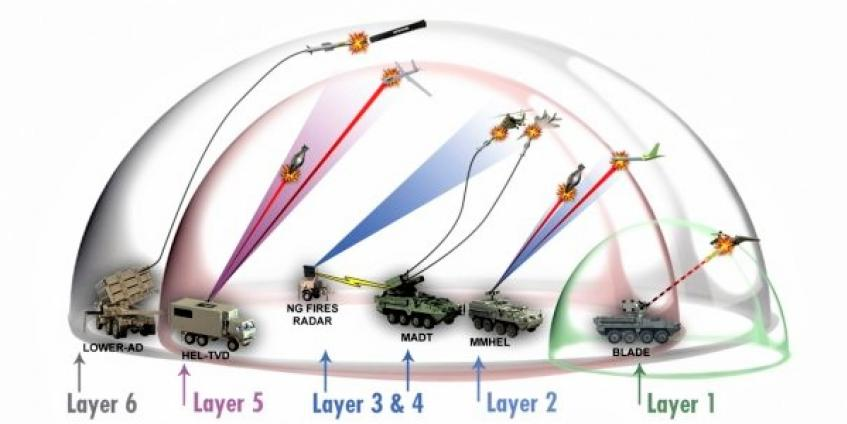
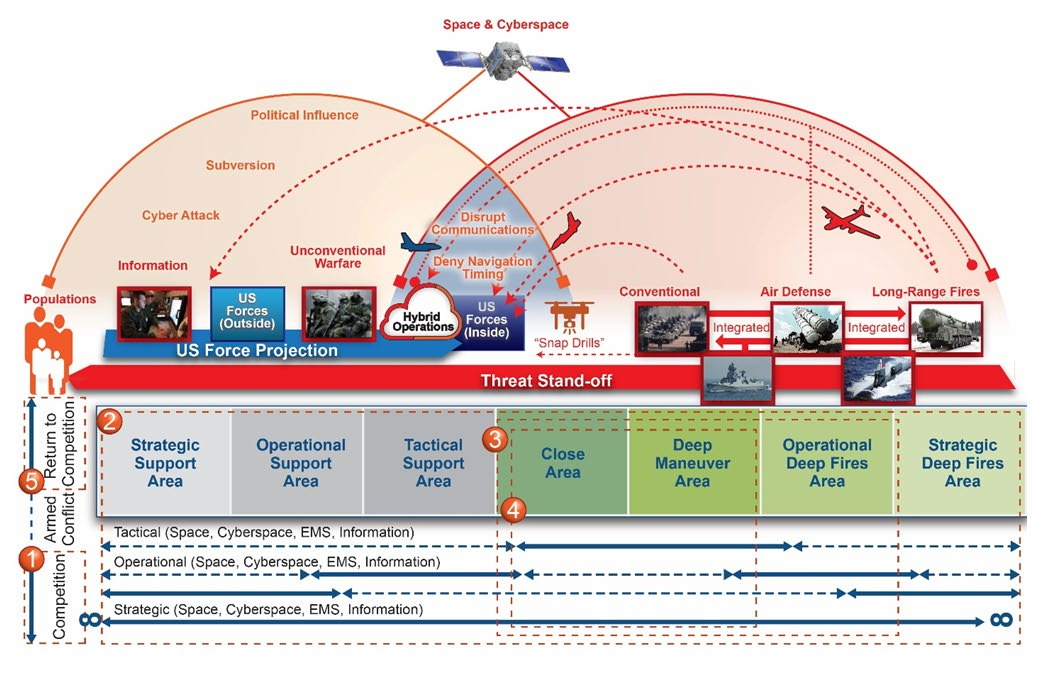
A fundamental strategy was formulated, involving simultaneous integrated operations across domains. This strategy involves pushing adversaries to standoff, (Note: In standoff, adversaries attempt to project protected areas against each other. Within these protected areas, friends are deemed safe, but foes who attempt penetration are endangered by the capabilities of the allies arrayed against them. Outside these protected areas, adversaries compete for control, by projecting their power.) by presenting them with multiple simultaneous dilemmas. (Note: Sydney J. Freedberg Jr. (November 22, 2019) SecArmy's Multi-Domain Kill Chain: Space-Cloud-AI Army Multi-Domain Operations Concept, December 2018 slide from TRADOC pamphlet 525-3-1 (Dec 2018). Multi-domain operations (MDO) span multiple domains: cislunar space, land, air, maritime, cyber, and populations.: In September 2020 an ABMS Onramp demonstrated a specific scenario, which can be illustrated by the 5 red numbered bullet points from the slide in TRADOC pamphlet 525-3-1: 1. Competition— No overt hostilities are yet detected. Blue bar (force projection) is in standoff against red bar (threat).; 2. Strategic Support area— National assets (blue) detect breaching of standoff by adversary (in red).; 3. Close area support— blue assets hand-off to the combatant commands, who are to create effects visible to the adversary (in red).; 4. Deep maneuver— blue combatant actions dis-integrate adversary efforts (per TRADOC pamphlet 525-3-1: "militarily compete, penetrate, dis-integrate, and exploit" the adversary); —Operational and Strategic deep fires create effects on the adversary. Adversary is further subject to defeat in detail, until adversaries perceive they are overmatched (no more red assets to expend).; 5. Adversary retreats to standoff. The populations perceive that the adversary is defeated, for now. (Compare to Perkins' cycle, 'return to competition', in which deterrence has succeeded in avoiding a total war, in favor of pushing an adversary back to standoff (the red threat bar). Blue force projection still has overmatched red threat.)) A goal is that by 2028, the ability to project rapid, responsive power across domains will have become apparent to potential adversaries. (Note: As informed by lessons learned in light of the 2022 Russian invasion of Ukraine)

In 2018, Army Secretary Ryan McCarthy said Futures Command would have three areas of focus:

1. Futures and Concepts: assess gaps (needs versus opportunities, given a threat). Concepts for realizable future systems (with readily harvestable content) will flow into TRADOC doctrine, manuals, and training programs.
2. Combat Development: stabilized concepts. Balance the current state of technology and the cash-flow requirements of the defense contractors providing the technology, that they become deliverable experiments, demonstrations, and prototypes, in an iterative process of acquisition. (Note: Andrew Eversden (17 Dec 2021) Here's the Army's 24 programs in soldiers' hands by 2023: 1. Precision Strike Missile (§ PrSM); 2. Extended Range Cannon Artillery (ERCA); 3. Long-Range Hypersonic Weapon (LRHW) will not deploy by 1 Oct 2023.; 4. Mid-range capability (§ MRC) missile, also called Strategic Mid-Range Fires (SMRF); 5. Armored Multi-Purpose Vehicle (AMPV); 6. Robotic Combat Vehicle (§ RCV); 7. Mobile Protected Firepower (MPF); 8. Future Unmanned Aircraft Systems/ Future Tactical Unmanned Aircraft System (FUAS)/(FTUAS); 9. Integrated Tactical Network (§ ITN) unified with § echelons above brigade, and the multi-domain task forces; 10. Common Operating Environment: Command Post Computing Environment/Mounted Computed Environment (CPCE)/(MCE) See Common operational picture; 11. Command Post Integrated Infrastructure (CPI2); 12. Mounted Assured Positioning, Navigation, and Timing System (MAPS); 13. Dismounted Assured Positioning, Navigation, and Timing System (DAPS); 14. Maneuver-Short Range Air Defense (M-SHORAD) using high-energy lasers; 15. Indirect Fires Protection Capability: Iron Dome; 16. Lower Tier Air and Missile Defense Sensor ([[Integrated Air and Missile Defense Battle Command System; 17. Lower Tier Air and Missile Defense Sensor|§ LTAMDS]]) - Patriot radar replacement; 18. Army Integrated Air and Missile Defense (§ IBCS); 19. Directed Energy Maneuver-Short Range Air Defense (DE M-SHORAD) High energy lasers; 20. Next Generation Squad Weapon (NGSW); 21. Integrated Visual Augmentation System (IVAS); 22. Enhanced Night Vision Goggle – Binocular (ENVG-B); 23. Reconfigurable Virtual Collective Trainer (RVCT) - Synthetic training environment; 24. IVAS Squad Immersive Virtual Trainer (SiVT) - Synthetic training environment; 25. One World Terrain/ Training Management Tools/ Training Simulation Software (OWT) / (TMT) / (TSS) - Synthetic training environment,) (Note: In Future Vertical Lift, FARA and FLRAA are projected to be prototyped by 2028, with fielding by 2030. The OMFV prototype is projected for 2025.) (See Value stream)
3. Combat Systems: experiments, demonstrations, and prototypes. Transition to the acquisition, production, and sustainment programs of AMC. (Note: ASA(ALT) (2018) Weapon Systems Handbook update Page 32 lists how the Weapon Systems Handbook is organized. 440 pages.: By Modernization priority; By Acquisition or Business System category (ACAT or BSC). The Weapon systems in each ACAT are sorted alphabetically by Weapon system name. Each weapon system might also be in several variants (Lettered); a weapon system's variants might be severally and simultaneously in the following phases of its Life Cycle, namely—°Materiel Solution Analysis; °Technology Maturation & Risk Reduction; °Engineering & Manufacturing Development; °Production & Deployment; °Operations & Support; ACAT I, II, III, IV are defined on page 404.) (Note: The Army's unclassified Multi-Domain Operations (MDO) concept is "the combined arms employment of capabilities from all domains that create and exploit relative advantages to defeat enemy forces, achieve objectives and consolidate gains during competition, crisis, and armed conflict".)

Army Secretary Mark Esper said that the 2018 administrative infrastructure for the Futures and Concepts Center (formerly ARCIC) and United States Army Combat Capabilities Development Command (CCDC, now called DEVCOM, (formerly RDECOM)) remains in place at their existing locations. What has changed or will change is the layers of command (operational control, or OPCON) needed to make a decision.

=== 2019 ===
AFC declared its full operational capability in July 2019, after an initial one-year period. The FY2020 military budget allocated $30 billion for the top six modernization priorities over the next five years. The $30 billion came from $8 billion in cost avoidance and $22 billion in terminations. More than 30 projects were envisioned to become the materiel basis needed for overmatching any potential competitors in the 'continuum of conflict' over the next ten years in multi-domain operations (MDO).

From an initial 12 people at its headquarters in 2018, AFC grew to more than 17,000 people across 25 states and 15 countries in 2019. AFC's research facilities and personnel (including ARCIC and RDECOM) moved from other commands and parts of the Army such as the United States Army Research Laboratory.

=== 2020 ===
ASA(ALT) Bruce Jette started xTechsearch to reward private innovators. (Note: The 2020 xTechSearch top ten semifinalists (who will each receive $120,000) are: Bounce Imaging, for a tactical throwable camera (self-orienting, pointable camera); GeneCapture, for deployable medical tests; Inductive Ventures, for magnetic braking of helicopters; IoT/AI, for hardware IoT AI devices; LynQ Technologies, for a GPS beacon; KeriCure, for wound care; MEI Micro, for Micro Electronic-Mechanical System Inertial Measurement Unit (assured position, navigation, and timing—A-PNT); Multiscale Systems, for meta-material; Novaa, for single-aperture antennas (multi-band rather than 1 dedicated antenna per application); Vita Inclinata, stabilized anti-spin hoisting for pulling injured people on a stretcher into a hovering helicopter) The COVID-19 pandemic led the Army to run an xTechsearch Ventilator Challenge. TRX Systems won an xTechsearch award for technology that allows navigation in a GPS-denied environment.

=== 2021 ===
On 13 October 2021, Army officials said most of AFC's 31 signature systems, and the four rapid capability projects of the Rapid Capabilities and Critical Technologies Office would be fielded by fiscal year 2023.

=== 2022 ===
In 2022, Army leaders projected that 24 of the top-35 priority modernization programs would be deployed by fiscal 2023.

Army Secretary Christine Wormuth announced the top six areas for the Army of 2030: 1) improved intelligence, surveillance, and reconnaissance; 2) "Coordination at greater speed"; 3) "Win the Fires fight"; 4) concealment via improved mobility and reduced signature; 5) "talk often and quickly"; (Note: Colin Clark (18 Feb 2020) Gen. Hyten On The New American Way of War: All-Domain Operations (ADO): "A computer-coordinated fight": in the air, land, sea, space, cyber, and the electromagnetic spectrum (EMS); "forces from satellites to foot soldiers to submarines sharing battle data at machine-to-machine speed"; "it's the ability to integrate and effectively command and control all domains in a conflict or in a crisis seamlessly"—Gen. Hyten, Vice Chairman of the Joint Chiefs; All-Domain Operations (ADO) use global capabilities: "space, cyber, deterrent [the nuclear triad (for mutually assured destruction in the Cold War, an evolving concept in itself)], transportation, electromagnetic spectrum operations, missile defense") and 6) logistics.

By 2022, Futures Command was conducting the third annual iteration of Project Convergence: experiments and joint tests of 300 technologies by the Defense Department and its allies and partners.

In October 2022, Wormuth assigned AFC to work on "Army of 2040" concepts. Two months later, Futures Command hosted a conference with representatives from AMC, TRADOC, FORSCOM, and Headquarters Department of the Army. AFC is leading the development of a new Army Operating Concept (v. 1.0) for the Army of 2030 to 2040.

=== 2024 ===
The 'All-domain sensing cross-functional team' (CFT) is standing up to support the plethora of data coming from data sources across the joint and combined services, allies, and partners. This CFT is built from the existing PNT (positioning, navigation, and tracking) CFT. See Combined JADC2. The contested logistics CFT was stood up in 2023.

=== 2025 ===
In May 2025, the Army announced it would merge Army Futures Command with Training and Doctrine Command to form the U.S. Army Transformation and Training Command.

On 2 October 2025, the Army deactivated Army Futures Command in a ceremony at Austin, Texas. The new Transformation and Training Command, known as T2COM, will be activated simultaneously.

== Organization ==
The commanding general was assisted by three deputy commanders.

- The Futures and Concepts Center: The first commander was AFC deputy commanding general General Eric J. Wesley, and it was led in 2021 by Lieutenant General Scott McKean. The center operates along four lines of effort: science and technology, (Note: As an example, any number of effects can be weaponized (see p.1 The New York Times 2 September 2018 "Invisible strikes may be cause of envoy's ills", describing the Microwave auditory effect), or else countered. Hypersonic vehicles are a countermeasure to ballistic missiles.) experiments, concepts development, and requirements development.
- Combat Development: Helps AFC commander to assess and integrate the future operational environment, emerging threats, and technologies to develop and deliver concepts, requirements, and future force designs.
  - The capability development integration directorate (CDID) of each Center of Excellence, works with its cross-functional team and its research, development and engineering center to develop operational experiments and prototypes to test.
  - The Battle Labs and the Research Analysis Center prototype and analyze the concepts to test.
  - The Joint Modernization Command provides live developmental experiments to test those concepts or capabilities, "scalable from company level to corps, amid tough, realistic multi-domain operations".
  - The Combat Capabilities Development Command (CCDC, or DEVCOM), the former RDECOM. Stood up on 3 February 2019.
- Acquisition and Systems (founded as Combat Systems in 2018): (Note: The Combat Systems Directorate was to be led by the ASA(ALT)'s Principal Military Deputy (Principal Military Deputy (PMILDEP) to the ASA(ALT)) who will produce those developed solutions and seek feedback. In 2022, AD2018-15 was rescinded by Army Directive AD2022-07, which in turn is subject to rescission 180 days after passage of FY2023 NDAA.)
  - Gen. Robert Abrams has tasked III Corps with providing soldier feedback for the Next Generation Combat Vehicles CFT, XVIII Corps for the soldier feedback on the soldier lethality CFT, the Network CFT, as well as the Synthetic Training CFT, and I Corps for the Long Range Precision Fires CFT.
  - Combat Systems refines, engineers, and produces the developed solutions from Combat Development.

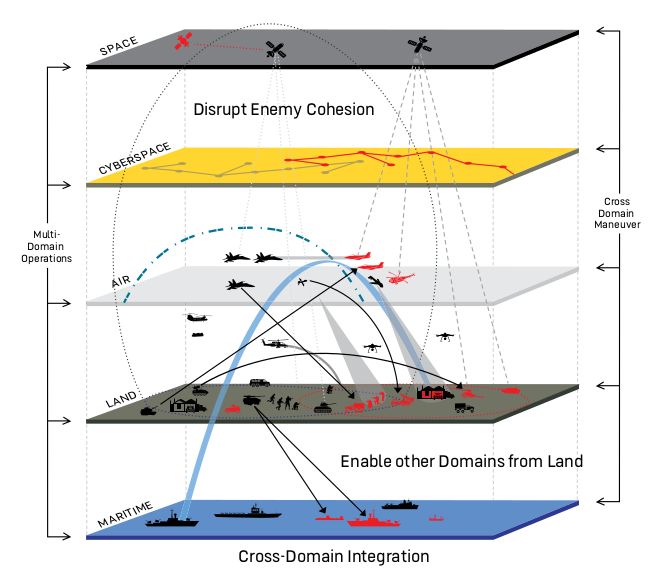
Multi-domain operations (MDO): Friendly forces (denoted in black) operating in multi-domains (gray, yellow, light blue, dark gray, and dark blue)—Space, Cyber, Air, Land, and Maritime respectively—cooperate across domains, working as an integrated force against adversaries (denoted in red). These operations will disrupt these adversaries, and present them multiple simultaneous dilemmas, to encourage adversaries to return to competition rather than continue a conflict.

=== Cross-functional teams ===
When AFC was created in 2018, it was given eight cross-functional teams, or CFTs: one for each of the Army's six modernization priorities, and two others for broader capabilities. These teams are Long-Range Precision Fires, Next-Generation Combat Vehicles, Future Vertical Lift, the Network to include Precision Navigation and Timing, Air-and-Missile Defense, Soldier Lethality and Synthetic Training Environment.

1. Improved long-range precision fires (artillery):—(Fort Sill, Oklahoma) Lead: BG John Rafferty ... PEO Ammunition (AMMO)
2. Next-generation combat vehicle—(Detroit Arsenal, Warren, Michigan) Lead: BG Ross Coffman ... PEO Ground Combat Systems (GCS)
3. Vertical lift platforms—(Redstone Arsenal, Huntsville, Alabama) Lead: BG Wally Rugen ... PEO Aviation (AVN)
4. Mobile and expeditionary (usable in ground combat) communications network (Aberdeen Proving Ground, Maryland)
  1. Network Command, Control, Communications and Intelligence— Lead: MG Pete Gallagher ... PEO Command Control Communications Tactical (C3T)
  2. Assured Position Navigation and Timing— (Redstone Arsenal, Huntsville, Alabama) Lead: William B. Nelson, SES
5. Air and missile defense—(Fort Sill, Oklahoma) Lead: BG Brian Gibson, ... PEO Missiles and Space (M&S)
6. Soldier lethality
  1. Soldier Lethality—(Fort Benning, Georgia) Lead: BG David M. Hodne ... PEO Soldier
  2. Synthetic Training Environment —(Orlando, Florida) Lead: MG Maria Gervais ... PEO Simulation, Training, & Instrumentation (STRI).

In 2023, the Army announced that it would create a ninth team, for Contested Logistics. The 2023 exercises for IndoPacom will test its prepositioned stocks. The CG of Army Materiel Command is taking the lead for contested logistics.

In 2018, McCarthy characterized a CFT as a team of teams, led by a requirements leader, program manager, sustainer and tester. Some CFTs also have representatives of U.S. allies. Each CFT lead is mentored by a 4-star general. Each CFT can have a Capability Development Integration Directorate. For example, the Aviation Center of Excellence at Fort Rucker, in coordination with the Aviation Program Executive Officer (PEO), contains the Vertical Lift CFT and the Aviation CDID. "We were never above probably a total of eight people", the Aviation CFT's Brigadier General Wally Rugen said in 2018. Four of the eight CFT leads have now shifted from dual-hat jobs to full-time status.

Each CFT must strike a balance amid constraints—the realms of requirements, acquisition, science and technology, test, resourcing, costing, and sustainment—to produce a realizable concept before a competitor achieves it.

The Army Requirements Oversight Council (AROC) itself serves as a kind of CFT, operating at a higher level as response to Congressional oversight, budgeting, funding, policy, and authorization for action.

AFC and the CFTs are expected to unify control of the Army' s $30 billion modernization budget.

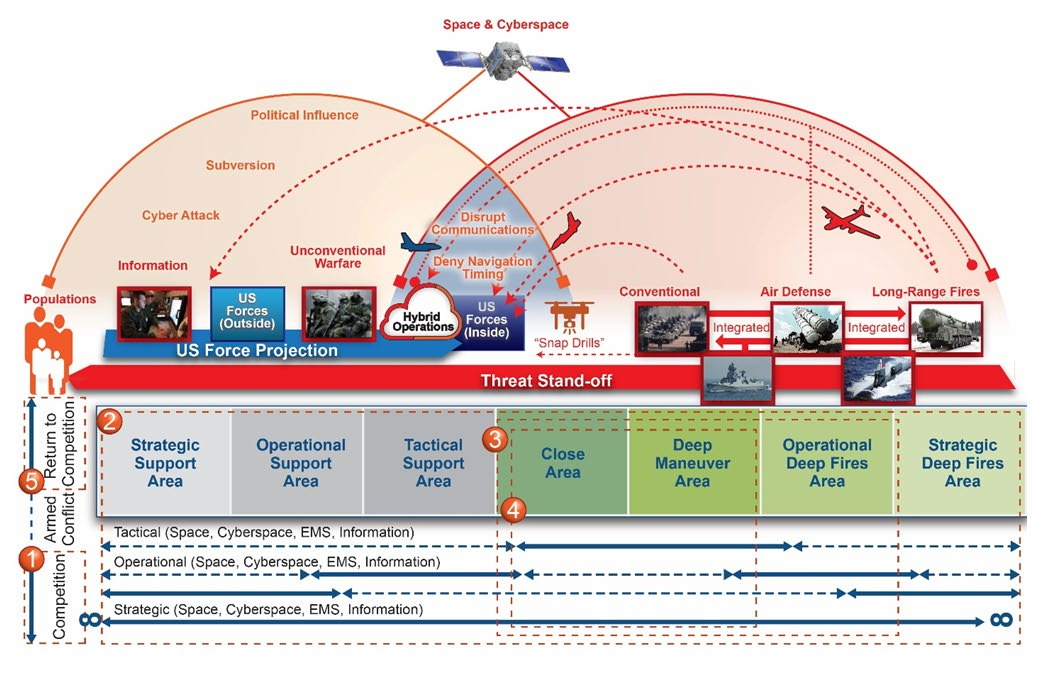
Multi-domain operations (MDO) span multiple domains: cislunar space, land, air, maritime, cyber, and populations. Echelons above brigade (division, corps, and theater army) engage in a continuum of conflict. —This illustration is from The MDO Concept, TRADOC pamphlet 525-3-1. (Note: Echelons above brigade (division, corps, and theater army) engage in a continuum of conflict.)

=== Partners ===
Project Convergence is a campaign of learning to aggressively pursue an Artificial Intelligence and machine learning-enabled battlefield management system.

AFC has given research funding to more than 300 colleges and universities with one-year program cycles. "We will come to you. You don't have to come to us," Murray said on 24 August 2018",

Multiple incubator tech hubs are available in Austin, especially Capital Factory, with offices of Defense Innovation Unit (DIU) and AFWERX (USAF tech hub).

AFC will work with other organizations such as Defense Innovation Unit Experimental (DIUx) as needed.

== Locations ==
AFC's headquarters is based in Austin, Texas where it spreads across three locations totaling 75,000 ft^{2}; One location is a University of Texas System building at 210 W. Seventh St. in downtown Austin, on the 15th and 19th floors; UT Regents did not charge rent to AFC through December 2019.

AFC personnel also operate in and from dozens of military installations around the country, including:

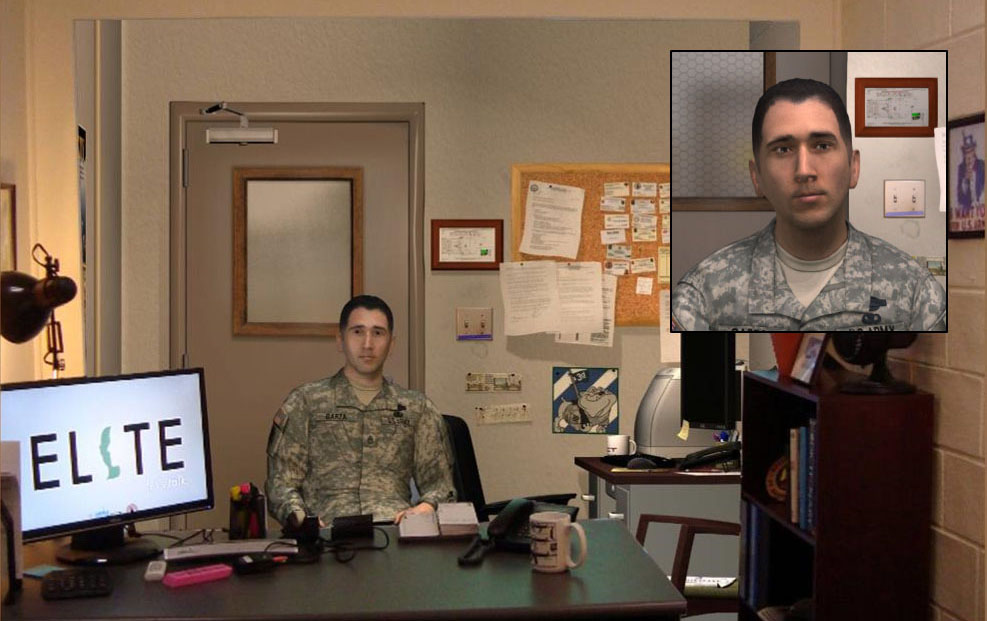
A simulation used to put leadership teams in a situation akin to a Combat Training Center rotation, "an intellectually and emotionally challenging environment that forgives the mistakes of the participants" In a role-playing session; a trainer (not seen) must tell the virtual Soldier what the Soldier is not doing correctly. Trainers using this program show a 40% increase in their knowledge of the Sexual Harassment/Assault Response & Prevention policy. These simulations are created at Army Research Laboratory (ARL) West, and ICT, Playa Vista, CA

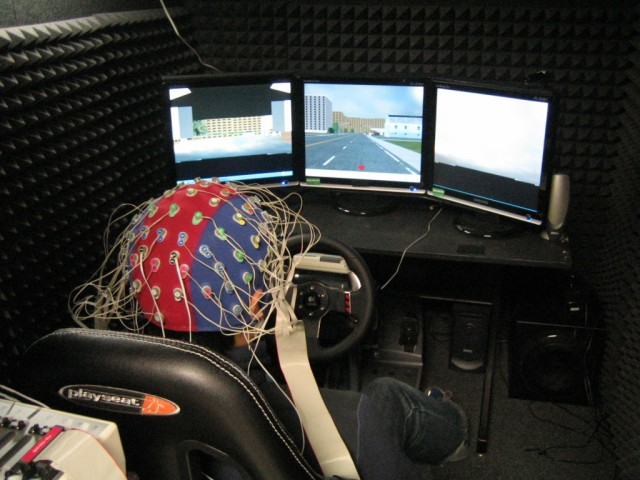
CCDC Army Research Laboratory Neuroscience Big Data: over ten years of EEG data, comprising over 1,000 recording sessions (The Cognition and Neuroergonomics Collaborative Technology Alliance)

- AFSG Army Future Studies Group, 2530 Crystal Dr, Arlington, VA 22202
- AFC Futures and Concepts Center, formerly ARCIC Fort Eustis VA
- JMC Joint Modernization Command, Fort Bliss, which is contiguous to WSMR
- White Sands Missile Range NM, also houses ARL, TRAC, and Army Test and Evaluation Command.
- FT LVN Operations research: Mission Command Battle Lab, Capability development integration directorate (CDID), The Research Analysis Center (TRAC), formerly TRADOC Analysis Center, Fort Leavenworth KS
  - CFT: Synthetic Training Environment (STE): The HQ for STE has opened in Orlando (28 January 2019).
- CCOE Cyber CoE - (its CDID and Battle Lab), Fort Gordon GA
  - CFT: Mobile and Expeditionary Network
- MCOE Maneuver CoE - (its CDID and Battle Lab), Fort Benning GA
  - CFT: Next Generation Combat Vehicle (NGCV)
  - CFT: Soldier Lethality
- AVNCOE Aviation CoE - (its CDID), at Fort Novosel
  - CFT: Future Vertical Lift (FVL)
- FCOE Fires CoE - (its CDID and Battle Lab), Doctrine updates to support strategic fires Fort Sill OK
  - CFT: Long Range Precision Fires (LRPF)
  - CFT: Air and Missile Defense
- ICOE Intelligence CoE - (its CDID), Fort Huachuca AZ
- MSCOE Maneuver Support CoE - (its CDID and Battle Lab), Fort Leonard Wood MO
- SCOE Sustainment CoE - (its CDID), Fort Gregg-Adams VA
- APG Aberdeen Proving Ground, Aberdeen MD, also houses Combat Capabilities Development Command (CCDC, now called DEVCOM), formerly RDECOM, Army Materiel Systems Analysis Activity (AMSAA), and C5ISR center (the Command, Control, Communications, Computers, Cyber, Intelligence, Surveillance and Reconnaissance Center was formerly CERDEC)
  - CFT: Assured Positioning, Navigation and Timing (A-PNT)
  - CFT: Network CFT (N-CFT)
  - CFT: Long Range Precision Fires,
- CCDC Armaments Center (formerly Armament research, development and engineering center—ARDEC), Picatinny Arsenal, PEO AMMO
  - CFT: Long Range Precision Fires
- CCDC Ground Vehicle Systems Center (formerly Tank Automotive research, development and engineering center—TARDEC), Detroit Arsenal (Warren, Michigan)
  - CFT: Next Generation Combat Vehicle (NGCV)
- Army Aviation and Missile Center (formerly Aviation and Missile research, development and engineering center—AMRDEC), Redstone Arsenal, Huntsville AL
  - CFT: Air and Missile Defense
- CCDC Soldier Center (formerly Natick Soldier research, development and engineering center—NSRDEC), General Greene Ave, Natick, MA
- Army Research Laboratory (ARL), Adelphi MD
- ARL-Orlando Army Research Laboratory, Orlando FL
- ARL West, Playa Vista CA
- ARL-RTP Army Research Laboratory, Raleigh-Durham NC
- AI task force at Carnegie-Mellon University

== Work ==
=== AI ===
In 2018, the Army secretary ordered AFC to draft an execution order to create an Army AI Task Force (A-AI TF) to support the DoD Joint AI center. The Army AI task force establish scalable machine learning projects at Carnegie Mellon University.

That same year, the Army Applications Laboratory was established along with AFC to help connect Army-future efforts and commercial products and ideas.

In 2019, the Army CIO/G-6 was ordered to create an Identity, Credential, and Access Management system to efficiently issue and verify credentials to non-person entities (AI agents and machines) As well, DCS G-2 will coordinate with CG AFC, and director of A-AI TF, to provide intelligence for Long-Range Precision Fires. CG AMC will provide functional expertise and systems for maintenance of materiel with AI. AFC and A-AI TF will establish an AI test bed for experimentation, training, deployment, and testing of machine learning capabilities and workflows.

In 2022, DEVCOM Analysis Center (DAC) signed a cooperative agreement with Northeastern University's Kostas Research Institute (KRI) to build on KRI's analytic framework, with six other universities on artificial intelligence and assistive automation (AI/AA), to further Army sub-goals ("mission effectiveness analysis, ontology for decision making, automatic target recognition, human systems integration, cyber resilience/electronic warfare threat defense, and assessing autonomous maneuver/mobility").

=== Software ===
Futures Command was to stand up Army Software Factory in August 2021, to immerse soldiers and Army civilians of all ranks in modern software development, in Austin. Like the Training with Industry program, participants are expected to take these practices back with them, to influence other Army people in their future assignments, and to build up the Army's capability in software development. The training program lasts three years, and will produce skill sets for trainees as product managers, user experience and user interface designers, software engineers, or platform engineers. The Al Work Force Development program and this Software Factory will complement the Artificial Intelligence Task Force. The Army has identified soldiers who can already code at Ph.D.-level, but who are in unexpected MOSs. In March 2023 the Marine Corps moved its software factory to the Army's software factory in Austin, Texas.

Data

The Army looks for ideas from defense contractors In 2018, for example, the Network CFT and the Program Executive Office Command, Control, Communications—Tactical (PEO C3T) hosted a forum so vendors could learn what products might soon work as testable or deployable systems. Vendors submitted hundreds of white papers; ones with "very mature ideas" were passed to the Army's acquisition community and to the Communications-Electronics Research, Development and Engineering Center (CERDEC).

The Army is interested in ways to accelerate acquisition programs. For example, this was an explicit request in the 2019 solicitation for requests for information about Future Vertical Lift. In January 2020, the optionally manned fighting vehicle solicitation was cancelled when its requirements added up to an unobtainable project;

Robotic combat vehicles

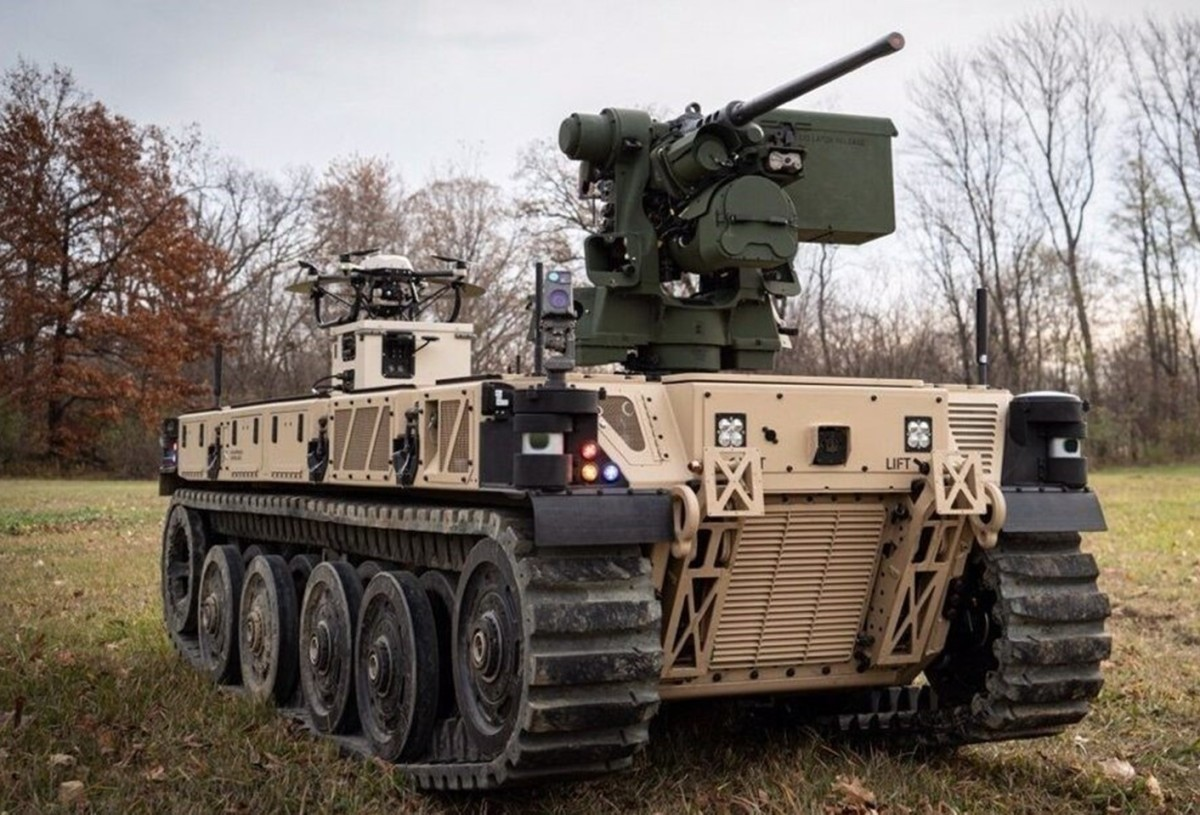
Robotic combat vehicle (RCV)

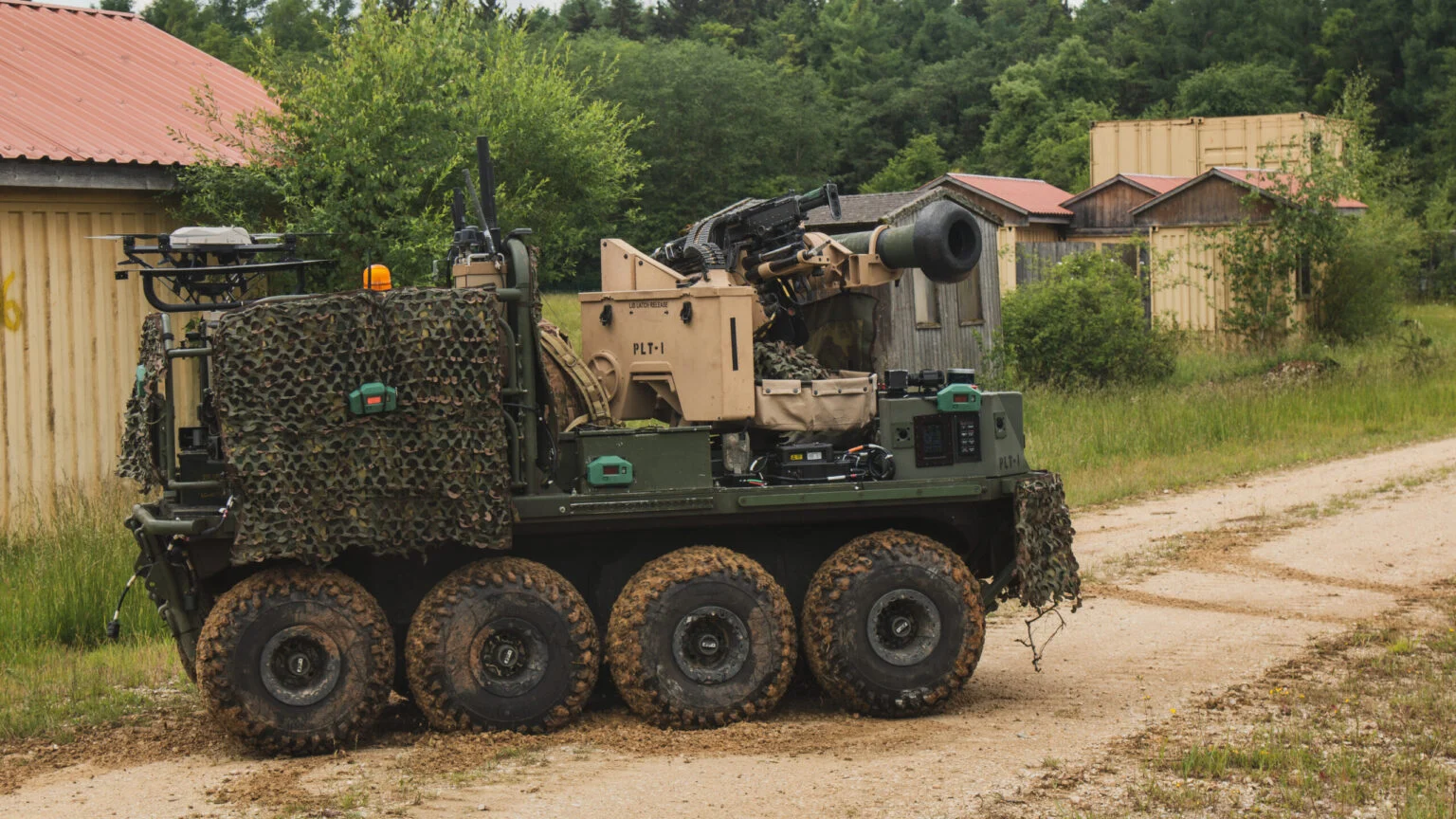
Project Origin unmanned ground vehicle (UGV), at Joint Multinational Readiness Center, Hohenfels, Germany

By October 2021, experiments with a company-sized tele-operated / unmanned formation were underway at Camp Grayling, Michigan. The 18 light and medium robotic combat vehicles (RCV), in concert with surrogate heavy RCVs (modified M113 armored personnel carriers), proxy manned control vehicles (MET-Ds), and drones for intelligence, surveillance, and reconnaissance (ISR), were to complete ATEC (Army Test and Evaluation Command) safety testing in May 2022 and live-fire drills in August 2022.

By June 2022, Army RCVs had demonstrated some disruptive capabilities, in preparation for Project Convergence 2022. At PC22, resupply by unmanned helicopters and other autonomous capabilities were demonstrated by systems from the US, Australia, and UK.

In May 2023, Army Futures Command disclosed concepts for robotic combat platoons, akin to the collaborative combat aircraft (CCA) of the Air Force.

==== Acquisition ====
Futures Command works with the ASA(ALT), who as Army Acquisition Executive (AAE), has milestone decision authority (MDA) at multiple points in a materiel development decision (MDD). AFC consolidates expertise into the relevant CFT, which balances the constraints needed to realize a prototype, beginning with requirements, science and technology, test, etc., then enters the acquisition process (typically the Army prototypes on its own and, as of 2019, initiates acquisition at Milestone B in order to have the Acquisition Executive, with the concurrence of the Army Chief of Staff, decide on production as a Program of Record at Milestone C). Next, refine the prototype to address the factors needed to pass the Milestone decisions A, B, and C which require Milestone decision authority (MDA) in an acquisition process. This consolidation of expertise thus reduces the risks in a Materiel development decision (MDD), for the Army to admit a prototype into a program of record.) The existing processes (as of April 2018) for a Materiel development decision (MDD) have been updated to clarify their place in the Life Cycle of a program of record: over 1,200 programs/projects were reviewed; by October 2019, over 600 programs of record had been moved from the acquisition phase to the sustainment phase. An additional life cycle management action is underway, to re-examine which of these projects or programs should be cancelled.

Futures Command picks which programs to develop. Each CFT works with the Army Acquisition Corps, U.S. Army Acquisition Support Center (USAASC), and Army Contracting Command. The Principal Military Deputy to the ASA(ALT) is also deputy commanding general for Combat Systems, Army Futures Command, and leads the Program Executive Officers (PEO); he has directed each PEO who does not have a CFT to coordinate with, to immediately form one, at least informally.

The current acquisition system has pieces all throughout the Army. ... There's chunks of it in TRADOC and chunks of it in AMC and then other pieces. So really all we're trying to do is get them all lined up under a single command.....from concept, S&T, RDT&E, through the requirements process, through the beginnings of the acquisition system—Milestone A, B, and C.

— Defense Secretary Mark Esper

The PEOs work closely with their respective CFTs. Operationally, the CFTs reduce degrees of separation between Army echelons, and provide a point of contact for Army reformers.

==== Prototyping and experimentation ====
The development process will consist of one or more cycles (prototype, demonstration/testing, and evaluation,) meant to find and discard unrealistic requirements before a project becomes a program. "Our new approach is really to prototype as much as we can to help us identify requirements, so our reach doesn't exceed our grasp. ... A good example is Future Vertical Lift: The prototyping has been exceptional," Esper said in 2019.

AFC activities include at least one cross-functional team, its capability development integration directorate (CDID), and the associated Battle Lab, for each Army Center of Excellence. Each CDID and associated Battle Lab work with their CFT to develop operational experiments and prototypes to test.

ASA(ALT), in coordination with AFC, has dotted-line relationships between its PEOs and the CFTs. In particular, the Rapid Capabilities and Critical Technologies Office of ASA(ALT) has a PEO to develop experimental prototype "units of action" for rapid fielding. In June 2019, the prototypes were for long-range hypersonic weapons, high-energy laser defense, and space, The Army tripled its spending on speed and range capabilities from 2017 to 2019.

CFTs and PEOs order up tests run by JMC and White Sands Missile Range, which hosts United States Army Test and Evaluation Command. Test results are analyzed by the Research and Analysis Center at Fort Leavenworth.

CCDC, now called DEVCOM (formerly RDECOM, at APG) includes the several Army research laboratory locations, as well as research, development and engineering centers listed:

CCDC is focusing on long-range precision fires the six RDECs and the Army Research Laboratory. As of September 2018, RDECOM's "concept of operation" is first to support the LRPF CFT, with ARDEC. AMRDEC is looking to improve the energetics and efficiency of projectiles. TARDEC Ground Vehicle Center is working on high-voltage components for extended range cannon artillery that save on size and weight. Two dedicated RDECOM people support the LRPF CFT, with reach back support from two dozen more at RDECOM. In January 2019, RDECOM was renamed CCDC; General Murray noted that CCDC will have to support more soldier feedback, and that prototyping and testing will have to begin before a project ever becomes a program of record.

Acquisition specialists are being encouraged to accept lateral transfers to RDECs where their skills are needed: Ground Vehicle Systems Center (formerly TARDEC, at Detroit Arsenal. Michigan), Aviation and Missile Center (formerly AMRDEC, at Redstone Arsenal), C5ISR Center (formerly CERDEC, at Aberdeen Proving Ground), Soldier Center (formerly NSRDEC, Natick, Massachusetts), and Armaments Center (formerly ARDEC, at Picatinny Arsenal) listed below.

Esper said AFC will reduce the time needed to define requirements for a new program from 60 to 12 months. Requirements may be reduced to "a simple statement of a problem." The development process will consist of repeated prototyping, demonstration/testing, and evaluation, designed to find and eliminated unrealistic requirements. ASA(ALT) Bruce Jette says the acquisition community should seek to fail and find a new solution rather than commit a program to a drawn-out failure.

Esper scrubbed through 800 modernization programs to reprioritize funding for the top six modernization priorities, which will consume 80% of the modernization funding, of 18 systems. His "night court" budget review process shifted $2.4 billion for modernization from programs that were not tied to modernization or to the 2018 National Defense Strategy.

Budgets will likely restrict the fielding of new materiel to one Armor BCT per year; at that rate, updates would take decades.

In 2019, the CIO/G6 piloted "enterprise IT-as-a-service"-style service contracts at AFC. In July 2019, such a contract set up a sensitive compartmented information facility at AFC headquarters.

In February 2020, the Army vice chief of staff said Army modernization was perceptibly speeding up.

This Life Cycle Management (formulated in 2004) was intended to exert the kind of operational control (OPCON) needed just for the sustainment function (AMC's need for Readiness today), rather than for its relevance to modernization for the future. AFC now serves as the deciding authority when moving a project in its Life Cycle, out of the Acquisition phase and into the Sustainment phase.

During the COVID-19 pandemic, the Acquisition Executive and the AFC commander created a COVID-19 task force to try to project supplier problems 30, 60, and 90 days out. In 2020, they tracked 800 programs and 35 priorities.

The CFTs must balance requirements, acquisition, science and technology, test, resourcing, costing, and sustainment.

Some modernization work will be done via the Doctrine, Organization, Training, Materiel, Leadership and education, Personnel and Facilities (DOTMLPF) framework.

The plan is to have an MDO-capable Army by 2028 and an MDO-ready Army by 2035.

In 2018, McConville said TRADOC, ASA (ALT), and AFC are tied together. The ASA(ALT) will coordinate the acquisition reform with AFC. He also said AFC will have to be "a little bit disruptive" to institute reforms within budget in a timely way.

Congress has given the Army Other Transaction Authority (OTA), which allows the PEOs to enter into Full Rate Production quicker by permitting the services to control their own programs of record, rather than DoD. This strips out one layer of bureaucracy. Middle tier acquisition authority is another tool.

There is now a PEO for Rapid Capabilities (RCO) with two program managers, one for rapid prototyping, and one for rapid acquisition, of a capability. Requirements are developed by the Cross-functional team (CFT). In 2019 RCO became the Rapid Capabilities and Critical Technologies Office (RCCTO).

In 2019, Futures Command was formulating multiyear enterprise campaign plans. The planning process includes Army Test and Evaluation Command (ATEC), AFC's cross-functional teams (CFTs), Futures and Concepts (FCC), Combat Capabilities Development Command (CCDC), and Army Reserve's Houston-based 75th Innovation Command. Pne goal is to formulate the plans in simple, coherent language which nests within the national security strategic documents. By October 2022 Field Manual 3-0 said "Multi-domain Operations are at the root of all Army operations".

A goal of AFC is overmatch of the capability of a competitor or adversary, particularly the imposition of multiple simultaneous dilemmas upon a competitor or adversary. By 2021, Army leaders recognized that the multi-domain operations task force could do so.

Planning for the Army of 2040 is underway.

=== Futures ===
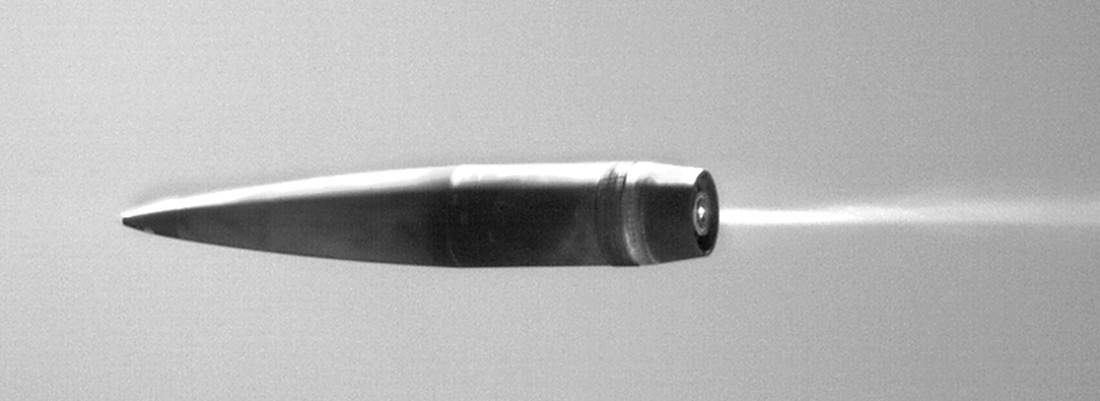
XM1113 extended range artillery round, shown here at a range demonstration, uses a rocket-assist motor

- Long-range precision fires developments include: (Note: Munitions such as PrSM will need to fire and then move, at targets on the move.)
  - Hypersonic materiel development: the Strategic long range cannon (SLRC), for a hypersonic projectile, is meant to have a range up to 1,000 nautical miles. An early ballistic test took place at Naval Support Facility Dahlgren, as announced at AUSA in October 2019. SLRC was cancelled in March 2022.
  - Extended Range Cannon Artillery (ERCA) development at Picatinny Arsenal: evaluate several manufacturing technologies, tied to the XM1113 munition. ERCA was cancelled in March 2024; Gen. Rainey has ceded towed artillery as at its end-of-life.
  - Targeting with thousand-mile missiles, "streamlining the sensor-shooter link at every echelon"—BG John Rafferty, in Integrated fire.
- Mobile & Expeditionary Network / MDO Multi-domain operations
  - Assured Positioning, Navigation and Timing (A-PNT)
    - An A-PNT event was scheduled at WSMR for August 2019
    - Prototype jam-resistant GPS kits are being fielded to 2nd Cavalry Regiment in US European Command (EUCOM) before year-end 2019. More than 300 Strykers of the 2nd Cavalry Regiment are being fitted with the Mounted Assured Precision Navigation & Timing System (MAPS), with thousands more planned for EUCOM.
    - A Modular Open Systems Approach (MOSA) to Positioning, Navigation and Timing (PNT) is under development.
      - Low Earth orbit satellites for Assured Positioning, Navigation and Timing—"When you look at the sheer number of satellites that go up and the reduced cost to do it, it gives us an array of opportunities on how to solve the problems" in A-PNT
    - ARL researchers have proposed and demonstrated a way for small ground-based robots with mounted antennas to configure phased arrays, a technique which usually takes a static laboratory to develop. Instead the researchers used robots to covertly create and focus a highly directional parasitic array (see Yagi antenna).
    - ARL's Army Research Office is funding researchers at University of Texas at Austin, and University of Lille who have built a new 5G component using hexagonal boron nitride which can switch at performant speeds, while remaining 50 times more energy-efficient than current materials—the "thinnest known insulator with a thickness of 0.33 nanometers".
    - ARL's Army Research Office is seeking diamond colloids, microscopic spheres which can assemble bottom-up into promising structures for laser action.
    - A demonstration of proof of concept allows soldiers to communicate their position using a wearable tracking unit. The technology allows soldiers (or robots) to prosecute a fight even indoors or underground, even if GPS were lost.
- Air, Missile Defense: An Integrated Air and Missile Battle Command System (IBCS) award, including next software build. of $238 million also funds initial prototypes of the command and control system for fielding in fiscal 2022.
    - Hypersonic glide vehicle launch preparations, beginning in 2020, and continuing with launches every six months.
    - At Naval Air Weapons Station China Lake, an FVL CFT-sponsored demonstration of interconnected sensors handed off control of a glide munition which had been launched from a Grey Eagle drone. When another group of sensors picked up a higher-priority target, another operator at the Tactical Operations Center redirected the glide munition to the higher-priority target.
- Soldier lethality
  - Network CFT sponsors sensor-to-shooter prototype for multi-domain battle, 2019 operational assessment.
  - Night vision goggles thermal polarimetric camera. Integrated Visual Augmentation System (IVAS) The Synthetic Training Environment (STE) is available to some of the troops outfitted with IVAS. Army Secretary Christine Wormuth said Army work on a common operating picture will be a foundation for joint operations.
  - CCDC ARL researchers are developing a flexible, waterproof, lithium-ion battery of any size and shape, for soldiers to wear; the electrolyte is water itself. In 2020 the batteries were engineering prototypes; by 2021 soldiers will wear the battery for themselves for the first time.
    - CCDC ARL and DoE's PNNL are examining the solid-electrolyte-interphase (SEI) as it first forms during the initial charging of a lithium-ion battery. They have found an inner SEI (thin, dense, and inorganic—most likely lithium oxide) between the copper electrode, and an outer SEI which is organic and permeable—a finding which will be useful when building future batteries.
  - CCDC ARL and MIT researchers are formulating atomically thin materials to be layered upon soldiers' equipment and clothing for MDO information display and processing.
  - Integrated, wearable cabling for capabilities such as IVAS, Next Generation Squad Weapon (NGSW), or Nett Warrior are under development; the potential exists to reduce 20 pounds of batteries to half that weight.
  - CCDC ARL is studying additive manufacturing (3D printing) for munitions.
  - Natick Soldier RDEC has awarded an Other Transaction Authority (OTA) contract to prototype soldier exoskeletons which augment human leg strength under harsh conditions.
  - DEVCOM Chem Bio Center (CBC) is developing sensors to detect contaminants.
  - The Infantry Squad Vehicle (ISV) is meant to be airdropped for a squad of nine paratroopers. The GM design was selected; first unit is expected at 1/82nd AB division in February 2021.
    - A-PNT devices are being miniaturized, with more redundant positioning sources.
    - In September 2019 in the Maneuver CoE's Battle Lab at Fort Benning, OneSAF simulations of a platoon augmented by UAS drones, ground robots, and AI were able to dislodge a defending force 3 times larger, repeatedly. But by current doctrine, a near-battalion would have been required to accomplish that mission.

In February 2024 the department of the Air Force announced its intention to create the Space Futures Command. The US Air Force is seeking to launch Integrated Capabilities Command by year-end 2024 to set future requirements for the USAF.

== List of commanding generals ==
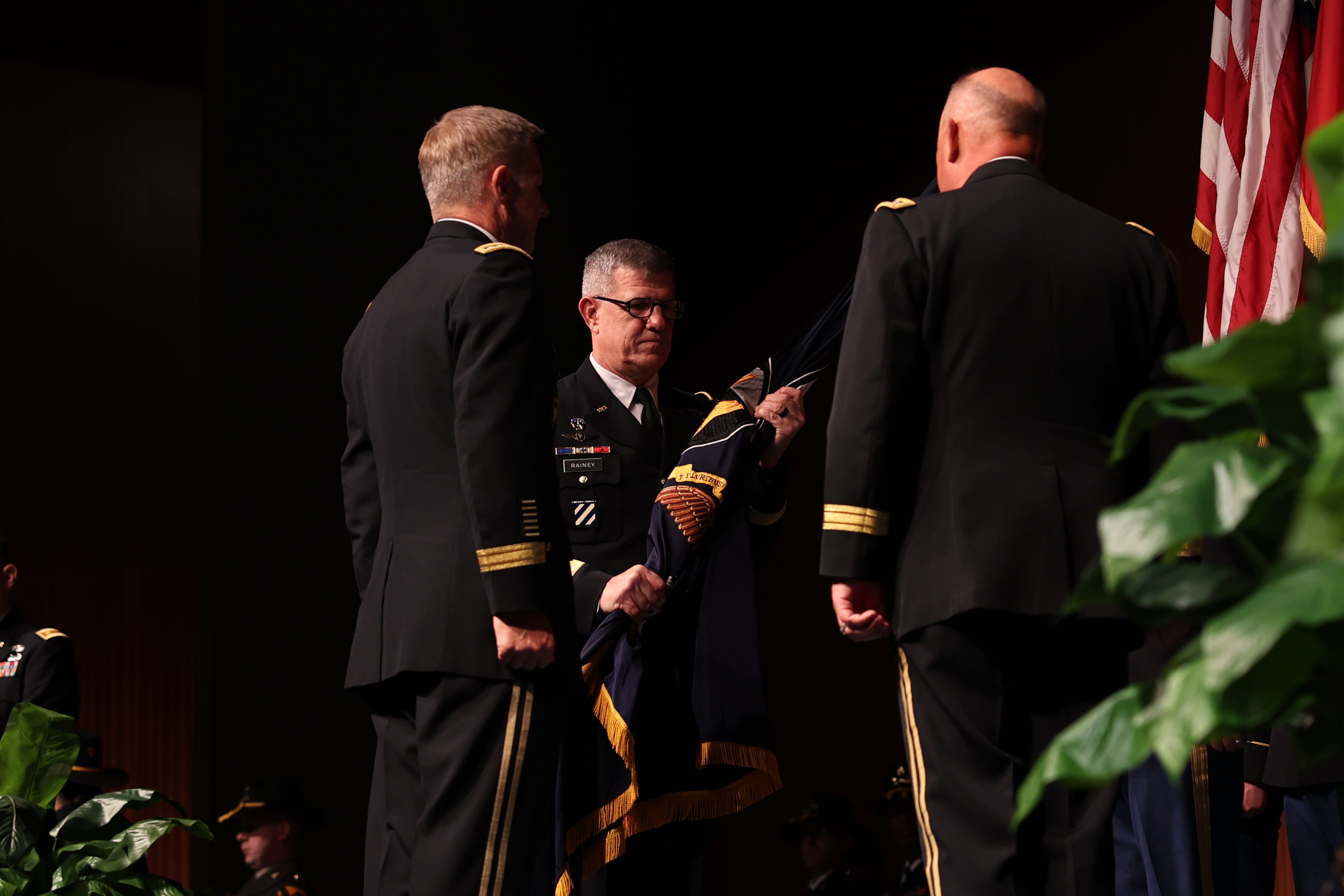
LTG James E. Rainey assumes command of AFC from LTG James M. Richardson on 4 October 2022.

General John M. Murray became Army Futures Command's first commanding general upon its activation on 24 August 2018. General James E. Rainey became AFC's second and last commanding general on 4 October 2022.

No.	Portrait	Name and rank	Took office	Left office	Term length
1	John M. Murray	General; John M. Murray	24 August 2018	3 December 2021	3 years, 101 days
-	James M. Richardson	Lieutenant General; James M. Richardson; Acting	3 December 2021	4 October 2022	305 days
2	James E. Rainey	General; James E. Rainey	4 October 2022	2 October 2025	4 years, 49 days

== See also ==
- Military acquisition § In the United States
- Military budget of the United States
- Command systems in the United States Army
- Air and Missile Defense
- Combat Capabilities Development Command Soldier Center § Soldier Lethality
- Manhattan Project
- Space Warfighting Analysis Center
