= Bradley Becker =

U.S. Army general

Bradley A. Becker
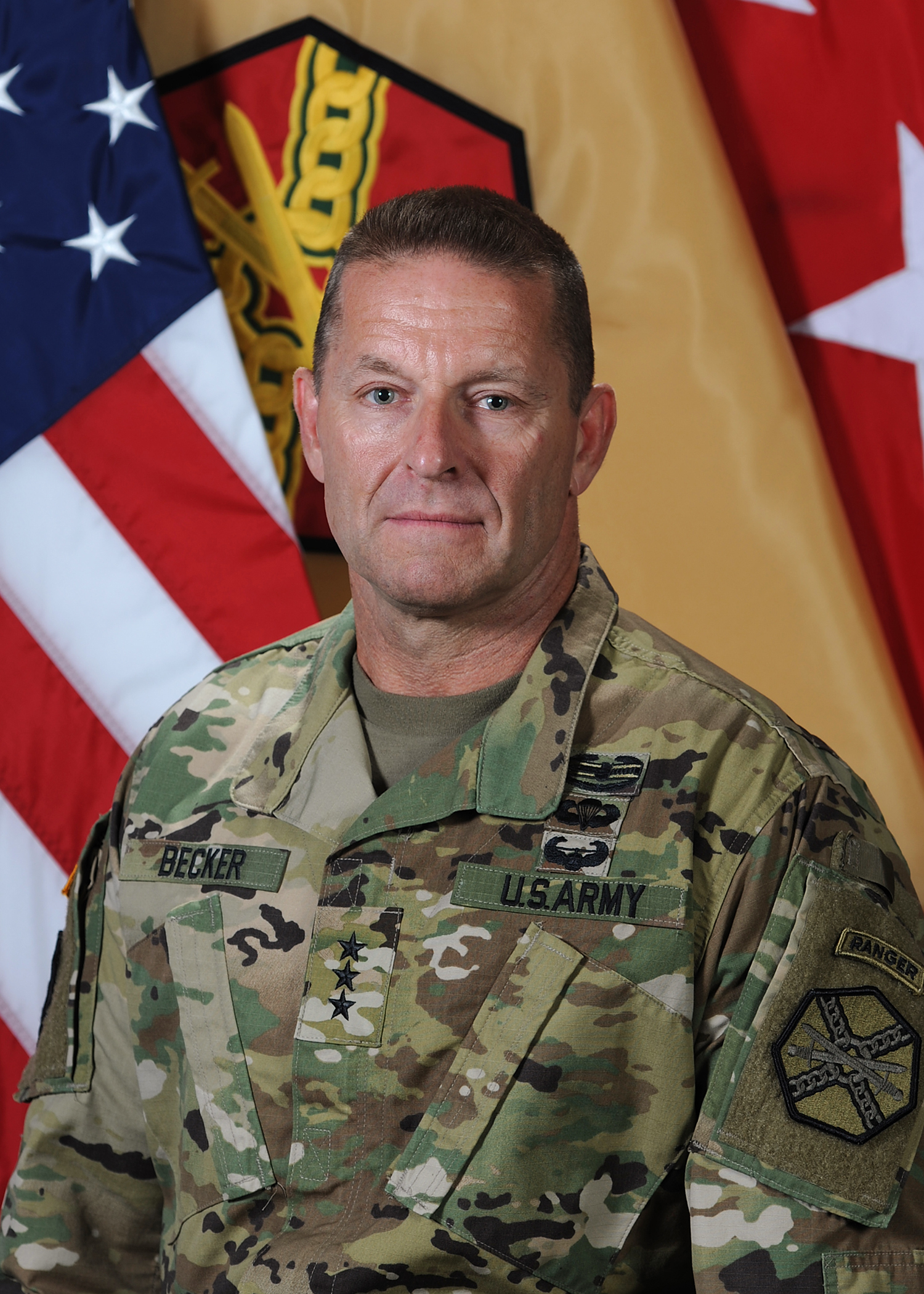
- Education: University of California, Davis (BA); Auburn University (MA); United States Army War College (MNSS)
- Military career
- Allegiance: United States
- Branch: United States Army
- Service years: 1986–2019
- Rank: Lieutenant General
- Commands: United States Army Installation Management Command; United States Army Military District of Washington; Joint Force Headquarters National Capital Region; U.S. Army Training Center at Fort Jackson; 3rd Battlefield Coordination Detachment, Eighth United States Army; 2nd Battalion, 8th Field Artillery Regiment
- Awards: Army Distinguished Service Medal (2); Defense Superior Service Medal; Legion of Merit; Bronze Star Medal (2)

Bradley A. Becker is a retired United States Army lieutenant general who last served as the 6th commanding general of the United States Army Installation Management Command from September 2018 to August 2019. He previously served as a Chief of the Office of Security Cooperation – Iraq from January 2017 to April 2018. Previous commands he held include serving as commanding general of the United States Army Military District of Washington and commander of the Joint Force Headquarters National Capital Region from June 2015 to April 2017, and prior to that as the 46th commanding general of the National Training Center at Fort Jackson from August 2013 to May 2015.

Becker was commissioned via the ROTC program at the University of California, Davis in 1986, graduating with a B.A. degree in political science. He also has an M.A. degree in political science from Auburn University, as well as a master's degree in National Security Policy and Studies from the United States Army War College.

He was relieved as commander of IMCOM and forced into retirement in August 2019 "due to a loss of trust and confidence in his ability to command". No reason was given for his relief. Though it was stated by Army spokespersons that the reason was not mission-related, lack of military response to complaints of poor conditions in privatized military residences was cited as a possible reason for his departure.

Military offices
Preceded by Peggy C. Combs	Commanding General of the United States Army Training Center at Fort Jackson; 2013-2015	Succeeded by Roger L. Cloutier Jr.
Preceded by Jeffrey S. Buchanan	Commanding General of the United States Army Military District of Washington and Commander of the Joint Force Headquarters National Capital Region; 2015-2017	Succeeded by Michael L. Howard
Preceded by D. Scott McKean	Chief of the Office of Security Cooperation - Iraq; 2017-2018	Succeeded by Sean M. Jenkins
Preceded by Kenneth R. Dahl	Commanding General of the United States Army Installation Management Command; 2018-2019	Succeeded by Timothy P. McGuire; Acting
