= Guy C. Swan III =

United States Army lieutenant general (born 1954)

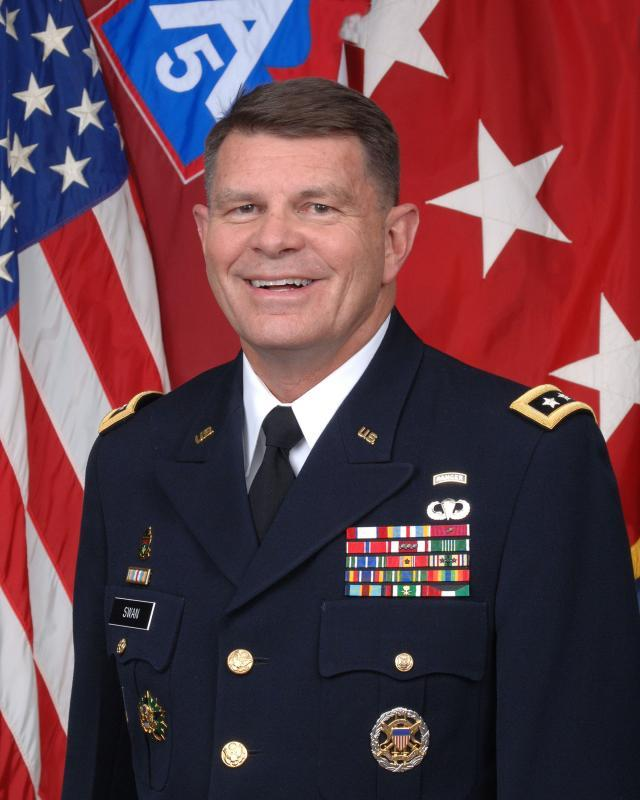
- Born: January 28, 1954 (age 72); New Jersey, United States
- Military career
- Allegiance: United States
- Branch: United States Army
- Service years: 1976–2011
- Rank: Lieutenant General
- Commands: United States Army North; Military District of Washington; Joint Force Headquarters National Capital Region; 7th Army Training Command; 11th Armored Cavalry Regiment; 4th Battalion, 64th Armor Regiment
- Conflicts: Gulf War
- Awards: Army Distinguished Service Medal (2); Defense Superior Service Medal; Legion of Merit (2); Bronze Star Medal

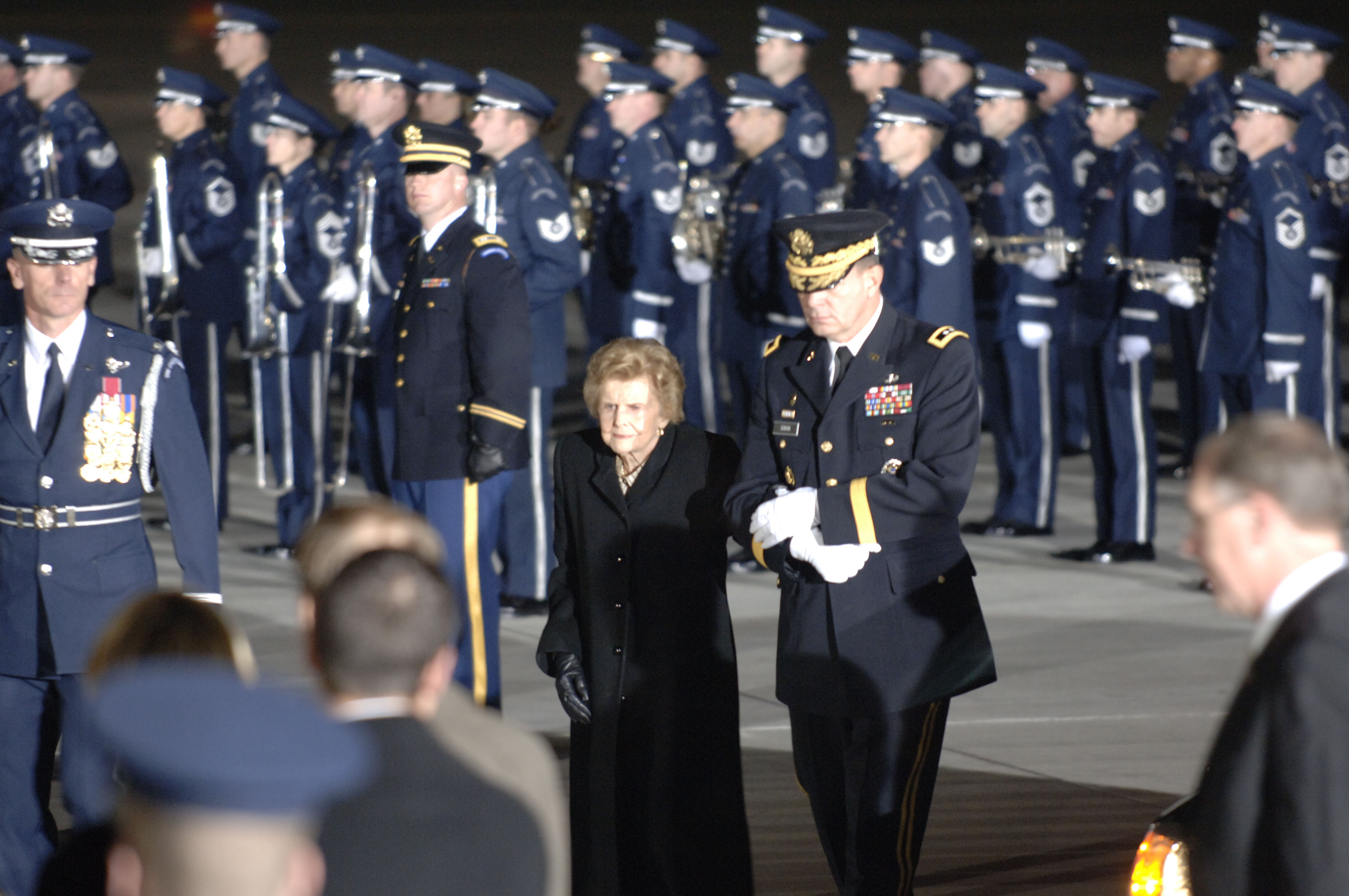
First Lady Betty Ford during former President Gerald Ford's state funeral.

Lieutenant General Guy Carleton Swan III (born January 28, 1954) is a retired United States Army officer. His final assignment was Commanding General United States Army North at Fort Sam Houston, Texas.

Swan grew up in the Pines Lake neighborhood of Wayne, New Jersey, where he attended Wayne Hills High School.

== Military career ==
Swan was commissioned as an armor officer from the United States Military Academy at West Point, New York, in June 1976. After graduation and initial officer training, he served in Korea as a tank platoon leader in the 2nd Infantry Division's 1st Battalion, 72nd Armor. Upon returning to the United States in 1978, he joined the 3rd Armored Cavalry Regiment at Fort Bliss, Texas, serving as a cavalry platoon leader, troop executive officer, and squadron adjutant.

From 1982 to 1985, Swan was the commanding officer of Company A, 2nd Battalion, 77th Armor Regiment at Fort Lewis, Washington, and later served as aide-de-camp to the commanding general, 9th Infantry Division (Motorized). From 1985 to 1987 Swan served as an Armor Branch assignment officer in Washington, D.C. He graduated from the US Army Command and General Staff College at Fort Leavenworth, Kansas, in 1988 and from the School of Advanced Military Studies in 1989.

Swan then served as the chief, G3 Plans for the 1st Armored Division, VII Corps, US Army Europe and Seventh Army in Ansbach, Germany, and later as the division's deputy G3 (Operations) in Kuwait, Saudi Arabia, and Iraq during Operations Desert Shield and Desert Storm. In 1991 he returned to the cavalry, joining the 11th Armored Cavalry Regiment (Blackhorse), V Corps, United States Army Europe and Seventh Army where he served as the executive officer of the 1st Squadron in Kuwait during Operation Positive Force, and as the regimental executive officer in Fulda, Germany.

Swan commanded the 4th Battalion, 64th Armor Regiment, an M1A1 Abrams main battle tank unit, in the 24th Infantry Division (Mechanized), Fort Stewart, Ga., from July 1993 to July 1995. He then completed a year-long National Security Fellowship at Harvard University's John F. Kennedy School of Government.

From June 1996 to June 1998, Swan was the regimental commander for the 2500-soldier 11th Armored Cavalry Regiment (Blackhorse), serving as the 57th colonel of the regiment and as the commander of the Opposing Forces (OPFOR) at the US Army's National Training Center, Fort Irwin, California.

Swan served at the Pentagon in Washington, D.C., from June 1998 to August 2000 as the assistant deputy director for strategy and policy (J-5) for the Joint Chiefs of Staff.

Swan took up a training mission again, this time as commanding general of the 7th Army Training Command (7th ATC), which he led from September 2000 to August 2002 at the Grafenwoehr/Hohenfels Training Area in Upper Bavaria, Germany. In that capacity, he was responsible for supporting the military training readiness of the 65,000 US Army Soldiers based in Europe.

Returning to Washington, D.C., Swan became the Army's "pointman" on Capitol Hill, serving as the Army's Chief of Legislative Liaison from August 2002 to July 2005. Prior to his assignment to USNORTHCOM, Swan was the commanding general of the Military District of Washington (CG/MDW) and Joint Force Headquarters National Capital Region (JFHQ-NCR) from July 21, 2005 through June 5, 2007.

As CG MDW/JFHQ-NCR, Swan became a known figure when he escorted Betty Ford during the nine days in December 2006 and January 2007 that marked the death and state funeral of her husband, former U.S. president Gerald Ford. His immediate predecessor, Major General Galen B. Jackman, escorted former First Lady Nancy Reagan at the state funeral of former U.S. president Ronald Reagan.

Swan retired in December, 2011, after relinquishing command to LTG William B. Caldwell

As of 2012, Swan was serving as Vice President of the Association of the United States Army.

On July 31, 2019, President Trump announced his intention to appoint Swan to be a Member of the Board of Visitors to the United States Military Academy.

== Qualifications and decorations ==
Swan holds a Master of Arts degree in National Security Studies from Georgetown University and a Master of Military Art and Science degree from the School of Advanced Military Studies. His awards include the Army Distinguished Service Medal, the Defense Superior Service Medal, the Legion of Merit, the Bronze Star Medal, the Ranger Tab, the Parachutist Badge, and the United States Armor Association's Honorable Order of St. George.
