= Timothy A. Guden =

United States Army soldier

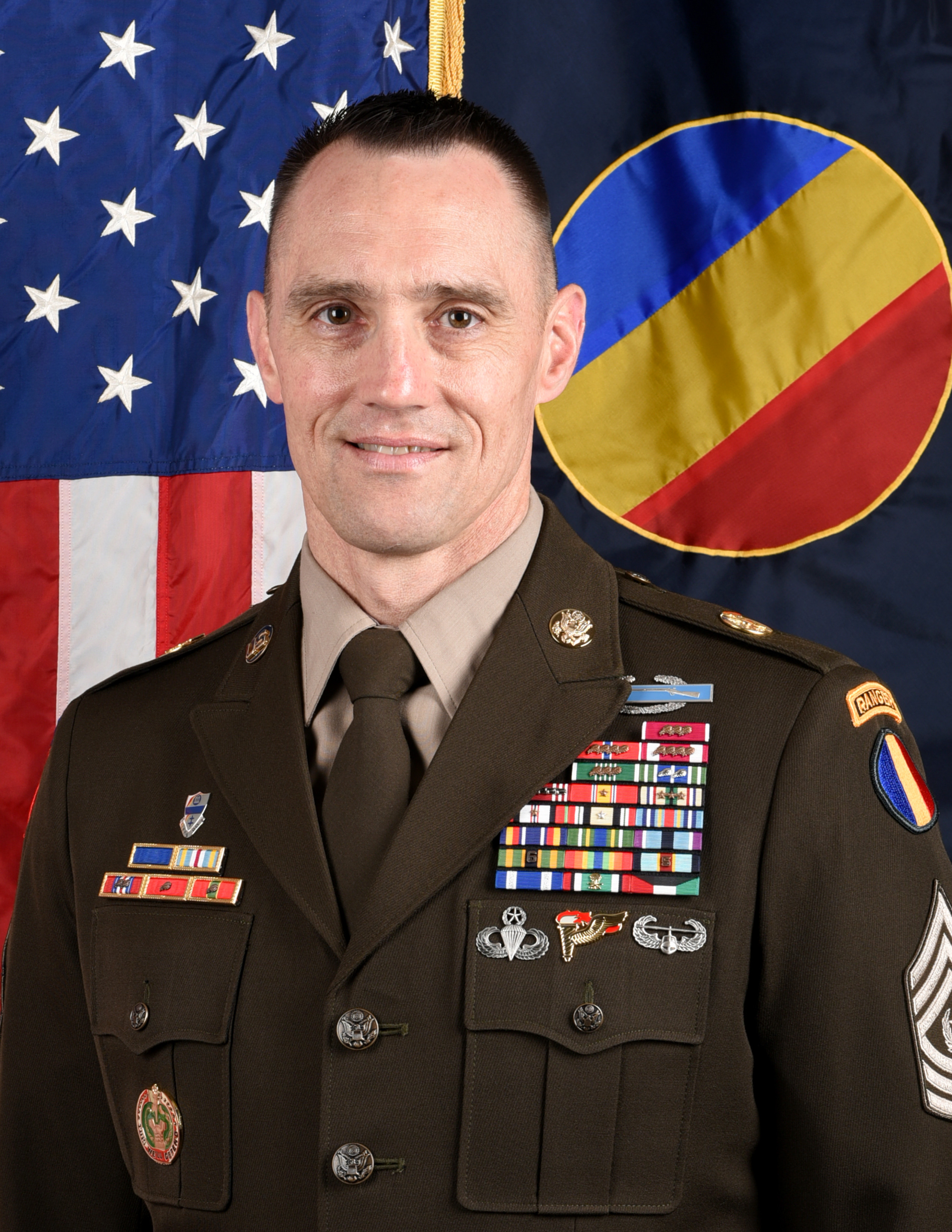
- CSM Guden at TRADOC
- Born: Medford, Wisconsin
- Military career
- Allegiance: United States
- Branch: United States Army
- Service years: 1987–2021
- Rank: Command Sergeant Major
- Units: 2nd Battalion, 508th Parachute Infantry Regiment, 82nd Airborne Division; 1st Battalion, 22nd Infantry Regiment, 4th Infantry Division; 1st Armored Brigade Combat Team, 4th Infantry Division
- Commands: United States Military Academy; United States Army Training and Doctrine Command; Joint Force Headquarters National Capital Region; Fort Benning; United States Army Infantry School
- Conflicts: Gulf War; Iraq War; War in Afghanistan; Operation Inherent Resolve
- Awards: Army Distinguished Service Medal; Legion of Merit (4)

Timothy A. Guden is a former United States Army soldier. Over a 33-year career, he served as the Command Sergeant Major for the United States Army Infantry School at Fort Benning, Georgia, from August 2012 to March 2014, the Command Sergeant Major of the Maneuver Center of Excellence and Fort Benning, Georgia, from March 2014 to May 2015, the Command Sergeant Major of the Joint Force Headquarters-National Capital Region from June 2015 to July 2016, Command Sergeant Major of the United States Military Academy at West Point, New York, from August 2016 to June 2018, and the Command Sergeant Major of the United States Army Training and Doctrine Command from February 2018 to September 2020. Guden retired from the Army on September 3, 2020.

== Military career ==
Born in Medford, Wisconsin, Guden enlisted in the United States Army on July 28, 1987. He completed Basic Combat Training at Fort Jackson (South Carolina), and subsequently Advanced Individual Training at Fort Gordon, Georgia. Throughout his career, he has held numerous leadership positions ranging from team leader to brigade command sergeant major in Signal, Cavalry, Aviation, Intelligence, Armor and Infantry units. He served as the brigade operations sergeant major for the 1st Armored Brigade Combat Team, 4th Infantry Division; the battalion command sergeant major for 1st Battalion, 22nd Infantry Regiment; and the command sergeant major for the 2nd Battalion, 508th Parachute Infantry Regiment. Guden then served as the brigade command sergeant major for the 2nd Infantry Brigade Combat Team, 82nd Airborne Division.

His combat deployments include four tours in Iraq, one tour in Afghanistan, and one tour in the Persian Gulf during Operations Desert Shield/Desert Storm.

== Personal life ==
Guden is married to his wife, Anne Guden, both of whom live together in North Carolina, post his retirement. They have two sons and two daughters. Also, an adoptive daughter.

== Awards and decorations ==
Guden has received the following awards:

Right breast			Left breast		
			Width-44 scarlet ribbon with width-4 ultramarine blue stripe at center, surrounded by width-1 white stripes. Width-1 white stripes are at the edges.		
325th Infantry Regiment Distinctive Unit Insignia			Combat Infantryman Badge		
Joint Meritorious Unit Award		Valorous Unit Award	Legion of Merit with three bronze oak leaf clusters	Legion of Merit with three bronze oak leaf clusters	Bronze Star Medal with four oak leaf clusters
Valorous Unit Award with two oak leaf clusters	Meritorious Unit Commendation with one oak leaf cluster	Superior Unit Award with one oak leaf cluster	Meritorious Service Medal with four oak leaf clusters	Army Commendation Medal with three oak leaf clusters	Army Achievement Medal with two silver oak leaf clusters
			Army Good Conduct Medal (11 awards)	National Defense Service Medal with one bronze service star	Southwest Asia Service Medal with three service stars
			Afghanistan Campaign Medal with service star	Iraq Campaign Medal with silver service star	Global War on Terrorism Expeditionary Medal
			Global War on Terrorism Service Medal	Korea Defense Service Medal	Humanitarian Service Medal
			NCO Professional Development Ribbon with bronze award numeral 6	Army Service Ribbon	Army Overseas Service Ribbon with award numeral 5
			NATO Medal for service with ISAF	Kuwait Liberation Medal (Saudi Arabia)	Kuwait Liberation Medal (Kuwait)
			Ranger Tab	Master Parachutist Badge	Military Freefall Jumpmaster Badge
82nd Airborne Division Combat Service Identification Badge			Air Assault Badge	Pathfinder Badge	Drill Sergeant Identification Badge
