= Michael Linnington =

CEO of Wounded Warrior Project, US Army Lieutenant General

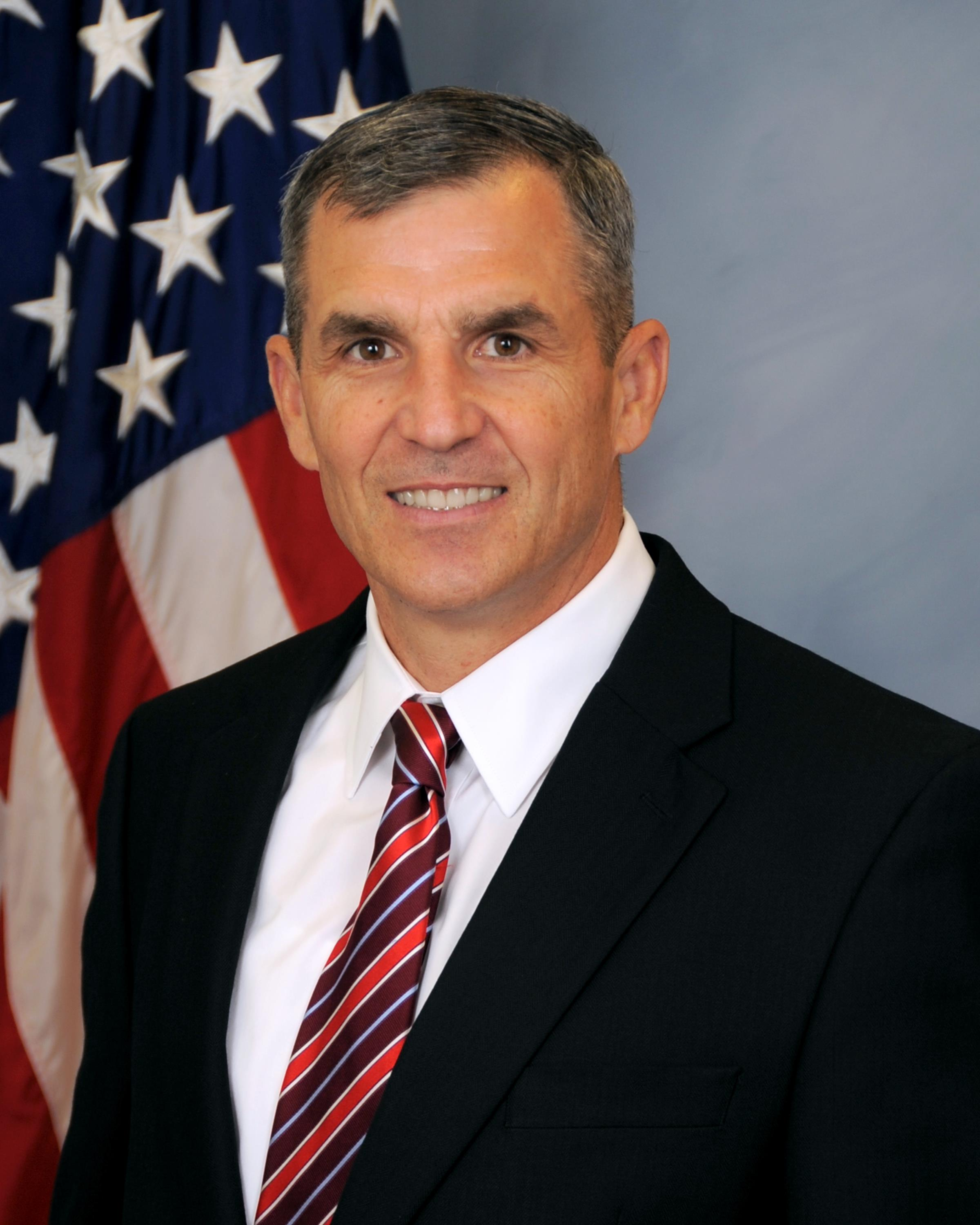
- Michael Linnington
- Born: 30 September 1958 (age 68); Cape May, New Jersey, United States
- Other name: Michael S. Linnington
- Alma mater: U.S. Military Academy at West Point, Rensselaer Polytechnic Institute, National War College
- Military career
- Allegiance: United States of America
- Branch: United States Army
- Service years: 1980-2015
- Rank: Lieutenant General
- Commands: 187th Airborne Infantry Regiment (Rakkasans)
- Known for: Wounded Warrior Project, USO
- Conflicts: War on terror; Operation Enduring Freedom; Operation Iraqi Freedom
- Awards: Expert Infantryman's Badge; Combat Infantryman's Badge; Bronze Star Medal; Legion of Merit; Distinguished Service Medal

Michael Linnington (born 1958, Cape May, New Jersey) is the former CEO of the United Service Organizations and former CEO of Wounded Warrior Project (WWP) and a retired United States Army Lieutenant General. He has more than 35 years of military experience and was the first permanent Director of the Defense POW/MIA Accounting Agency (DPAA).

Throughout his 35-year military career, Linnington has served as a Military Deputy to the Under Secretary of Defense for Personnel and Readiness, was the Commanding General of the Joint Force Headquarters-National Capital Region, the Deputy Commanding General at Fort Benning, GA, Commandant of Cadets at the U.S. Military Academy at West Point and Deputy Chief of Staff for Plans and Policy for the International Security Assistance Force Joint Command in Kabul, Afghanistan.

Linnington graduated from the U.S. Military Academy at West Point in 1980 and holds master’s degrees from Rensselaer Polytechnic Institute and the National War College.

== Early life and education ==
Linnington was born in Cape May, New Jersey and grew up in the Villas section of the Lower Township, New Jersey. He grew up with five brothers and went to military high school and military college. He attended the former St. Raymond's Roman Catholic School while working in a local restaurant and nearby Citgo gas station. He then graduated from Valley Forge Military Academy in 1976.

In 1980, he graduated from the U.S. Military Academy at West Point where he met his wife Brenda, who also graduated from the U.S. Military Academy in 1981. He has master's degrees in Applied Mathematics from Rensselaer Polytechnic Institute and in National Security Strategy from the National War College.

== Military career ==
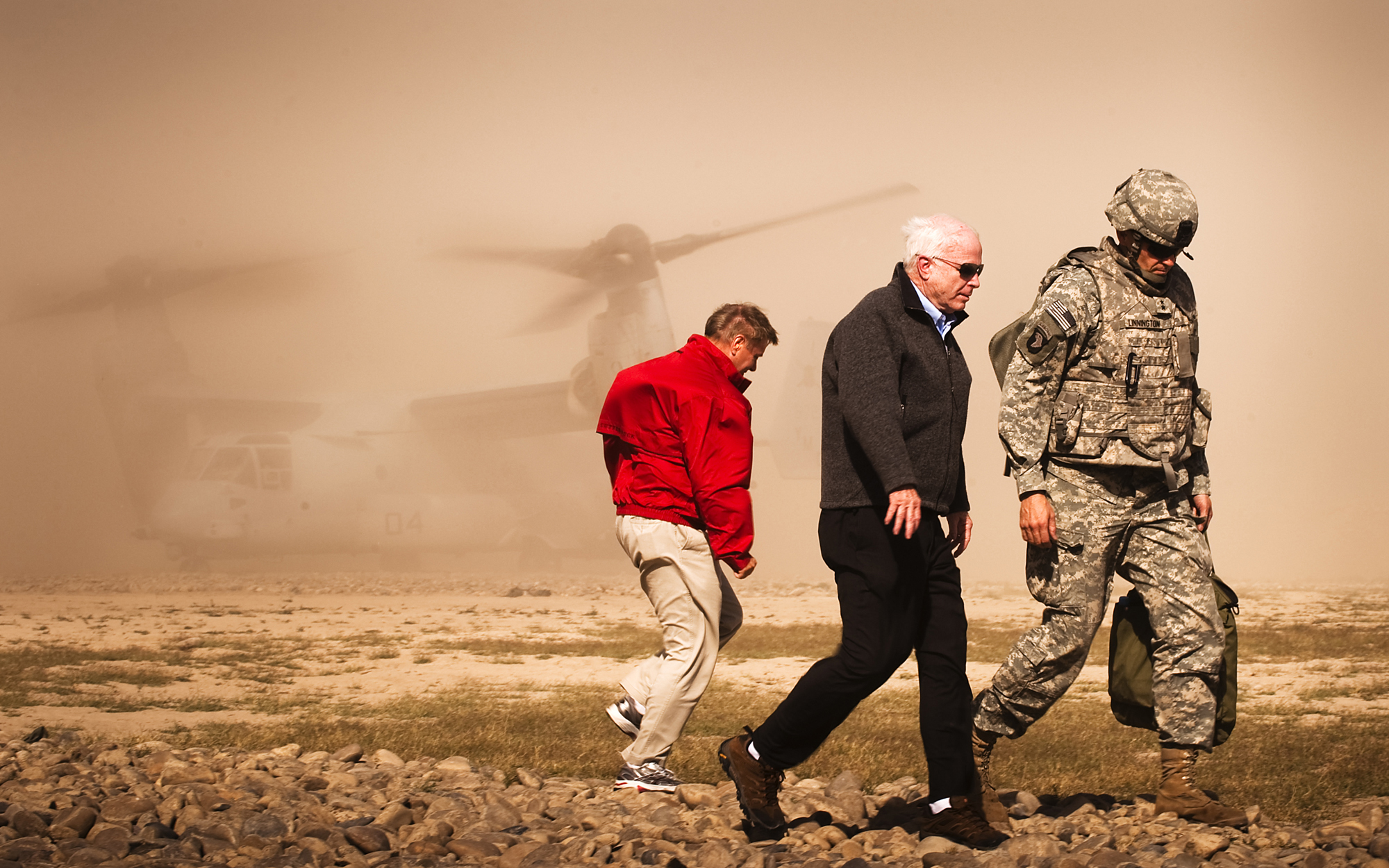
Linnington with Senators John McCain and Lindsey Graham, Nawa, Afghanistan, Nov. 11, 2010

Michael Linnington is a military veteran with a 35-year career in the United States Army. Linnington is airborne, air assault, and ranger qualified. Throughout his career, he held a variety of command and staff positions in various locations around the world.

He was Deputy Commanding General in command of 75,000 troops at Fort Benning, Georgia from 2007-2008. In 2007, he was promoted to Brigadier General and began a new role as commandant of Cadets at West Point in May 2008.

In 2009, Linnington testified to a U.S. Senate subcommittee on military suicides and prevention efforts at West Point.

Linnington fought in Operation Enduring Freedom in Afghanistan. While in Afghanistan, he commanded the 3rd Brigade of the 101st Airborne Division, also known as the Rakkasans.

Linnington led 1,500 vehicles in his convoy, and about 5,000 troops in the brigade. In 2009, he returned to Kabul, Afghanistan as Deputy Chief of Staff for Plans and Policy for the International Security Assistance Force Joint Command.

Linnington fought in Operation Iraqi Freedom in Iraq and served directly under Gen. David H. Petraeus.

Linnington served as Commanding General of the Military District of Washington/Joint Force Headquarters-National Capital Region from 2011-2013.

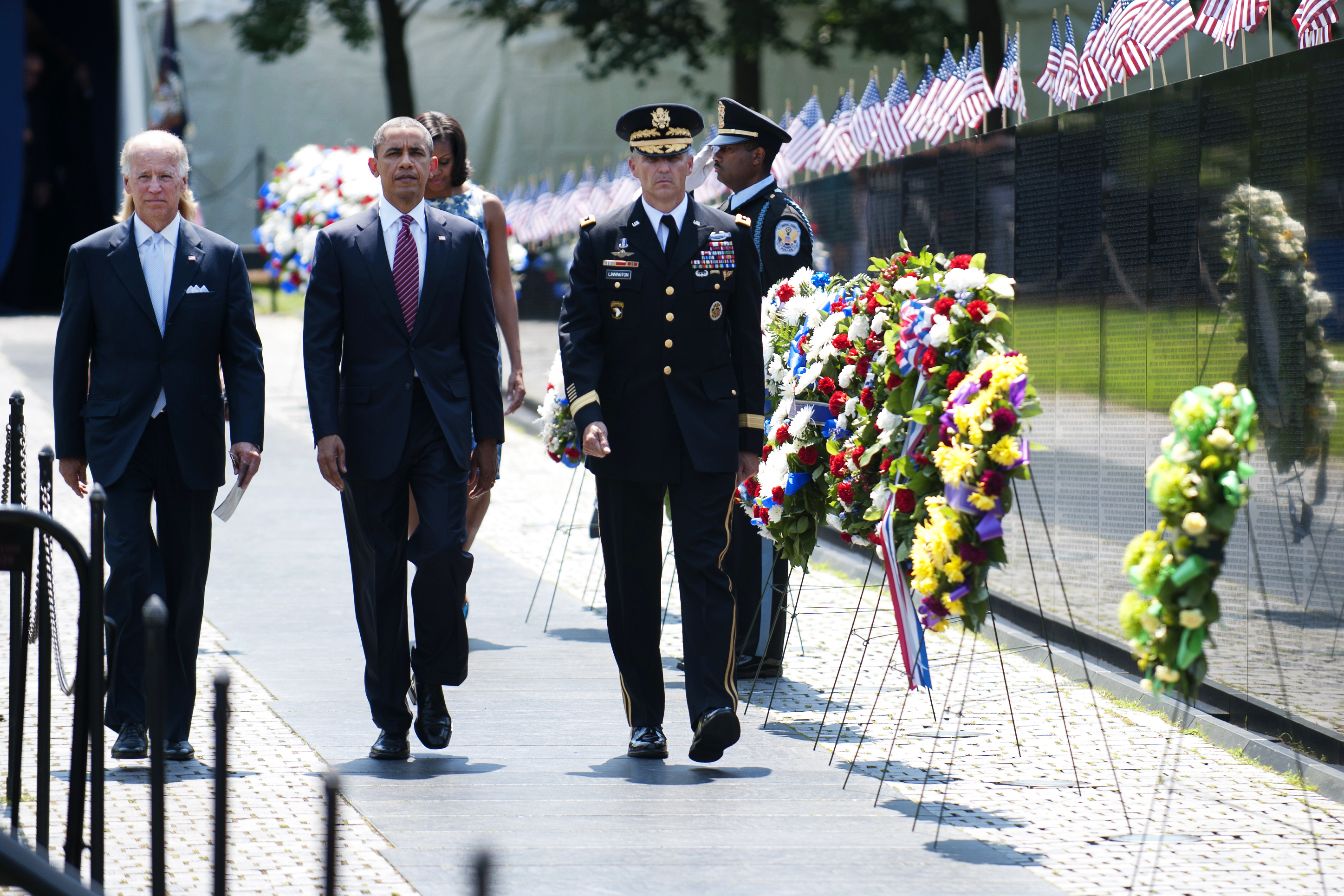
Linnington with President Barack Obama and Vice President Joe Biden, Vietnam Veterans Memorial Wall, Washington, D.C., May 28, 2012

During his time as Commanding General, Linnington made a number of appearances in Washington, D.C. He walked with US President Barack Obama to the Tomb of the Unknown Soldier to commemorate Veterans Day on November 11, 2011. On November 12, 2011, Linnington hosted the ceremony for the 150th anniversary of President Lincoln's Grand Review at Fort McNair Parade Field, Washington, DC. In 2013, Linnington headed the task force for President Obama's second inauguration.

Linnington served as Military Deputy to the Under Secretary of Defense (Personnel and Readiness) from 2013 to 2015.

=== Awards ===
- Expert Infantryman's Badge
- Combat Infantryman's Badge
- Distinguished Service Medal
- Legion of Merit
- Bronze Star Medal

== Post-military career ==
=== Defense POW/MIA Accounting Agency (DPAA) ===
In 2014, two organizations, the Defense Prisoner of War/Missing Personnel Office and the Joint POW/MIA Accounting Command were merged into the Defense POW/MIA Accounting Agency (DPAA). Its mission was to account for missing personnel to their families and provide accurate and timely details of their story. Lt. Gen. (Ret.) Michael S. Linnington was its first permanent director. When Linnington took over, his priorities were to continue the mission during reorganization without disrupting field operations, finish reorganization of conflict accounting, streamline and modernize operations and communications, improve communications to stakeholders, and expand partnerships.

During his time as director, the agency nearly doubled identification of missing service members.

=== Wounded Warrior Project (WWP) ===
On July 18, 2016, Lt. Gen. (Ret.) Michael S. Linnington was appointed Chief Executive Officer of Wounded Warrior Project, a nonprofit veterans service organization providing programs for veterans injured in service on or after 9/11. He told a reporter he felt compelled to lead WWP after he observed the organization began suffering due to a media scandal in 2016. The allegations of the scandal were later disproved by several audits and investigations held by third parties, including the Better Business Bureau's Wise Giving Alliance. Media coverage resulted in a severe drop in donations and revenue. As a result, Linnington's first actions were focused on reducing costs while maximizing impact from veterans programs, including a pay cut from the previous WWP CEO salary.

On March 9, 2017, Linnington testified to Congress about veterans healthcare needs highlighting four major areas:

1. Collaboration between government and nonprofits
2. Improving care for veterans with traumatic brain injury (TBI)
3. Improving health insurance for severely injured veterans
4. Extending In Vitro Fertilization benefits provided by the VA

On February 5, 2019, Linnington announced to ABC/NBC-owned First Coast News that WWP has "turned the corner" and is doing more with less resources. "We are serving more warriors today than ever before in impactful ways that change their lives."

In April 2022, Linnington lobbied for H.R. 3967 (Honoring our PACT Act of 2022), a bill to provide healthcare and resources to veterans who were exposed to toxic substances during military service.

In March 2023, Linnington was named the Grand Marshal of the New York Veterans Day Parade. As the Grand Marshal, Linnington will lead over 20,000 people up Fifth Avenue on November 11, 2023.

Linnington also saw the number of peer support group leaders rise to hundreds leading events in their communities as volunteers. He saw the organization shift its focus to provide long-term financial aid for wounded veterans, emotional support for families, career guidance, and social events across the U.S.
