= United States Army Military District of Washington =

US Army command

Military District of Washington
- Shoulder sleeve insignia
- Active: 1862–1869; 1921–present
- Country: United States
- Branch: Army
- Type: Army Command
- Part of: United States Northern Command
- Garrison/HQ: Fort Lesley J. McNair, Washington, D.C.
- Nickname: Guardian of the Nation's Capital
- Mottos: Latin: Haec protegimus, lit. 'This We Guard'
- Wars: World War II
- Website: jtfncr.mdw.army.mil

Commanders
- Current commander: Maj. Gen. Antoinette R. Gant
- Notable commanders: Harry H. Bandholtz; John T. Cole

Insignia
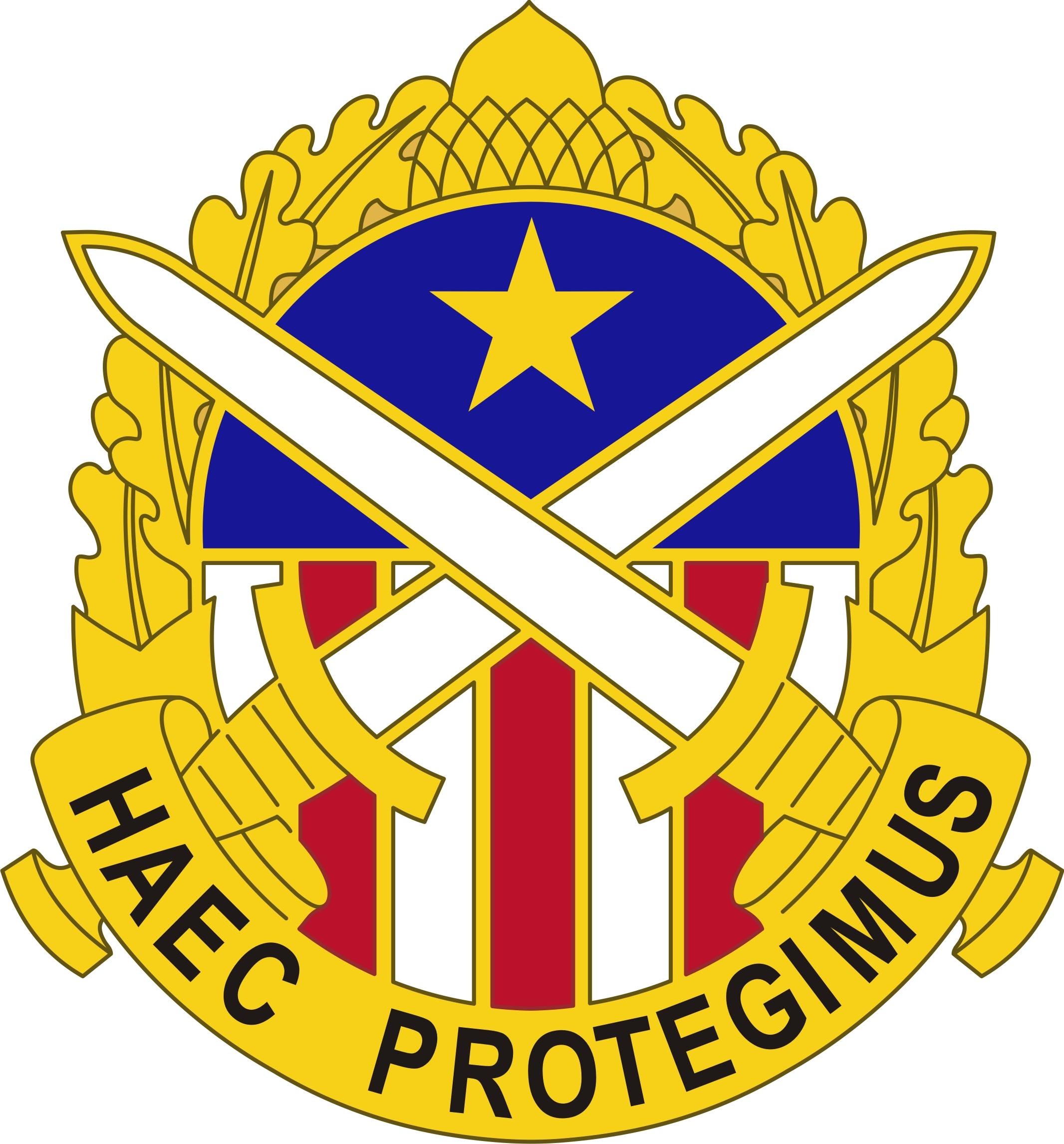
- Distinctive unit insignia

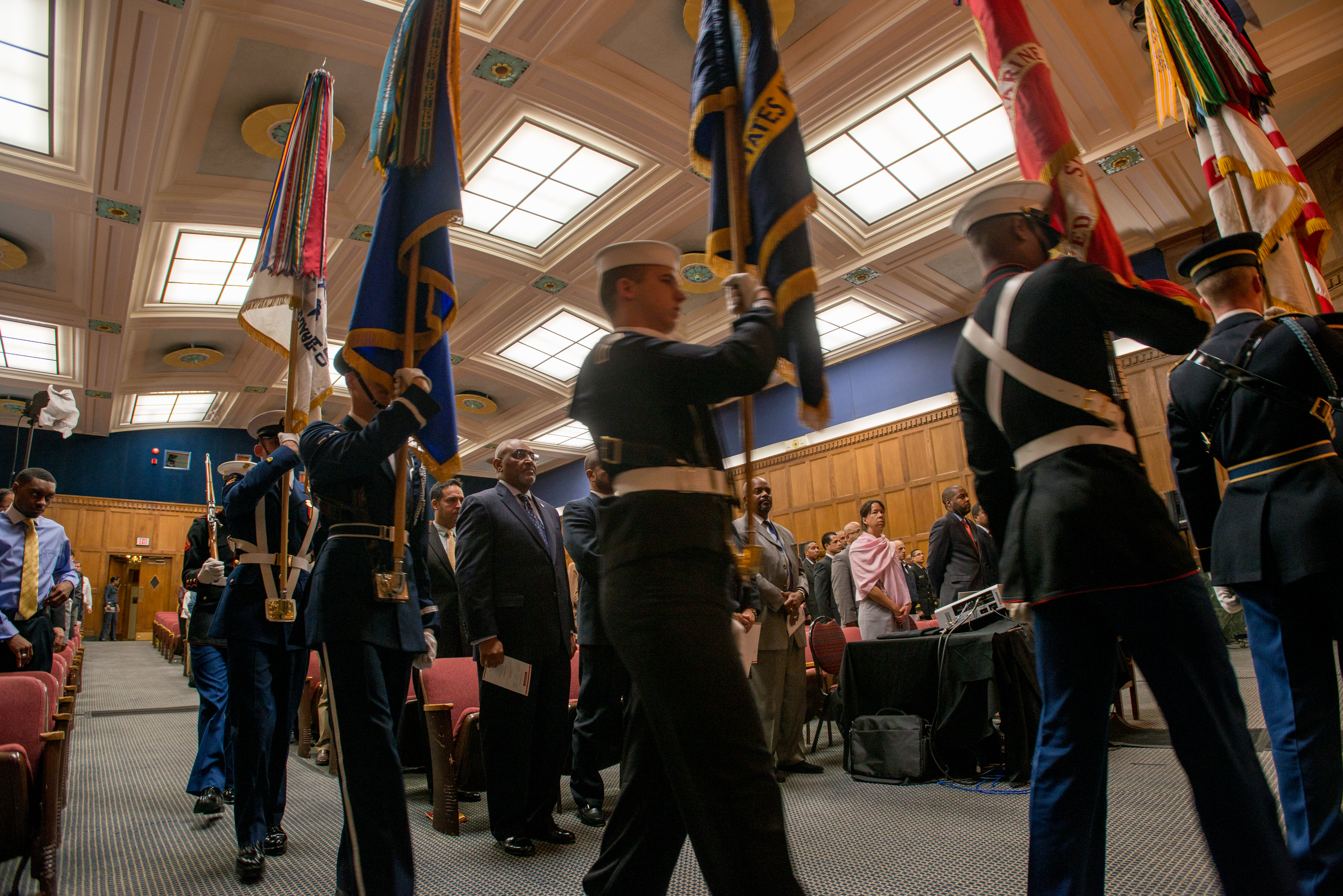
The U.S. Military District of Washington Joint Armed Forces Color Guard presents the Colors at the USDA Headquarters' Jefferson Auditorium, in Washington, D.C., on Tuesday, 4 Nov. 2014

The United States Army Military District of Washington (MDW) is one of nineteen major commands of the United States Army. It is headquartered in Fort Lesley J. McNair in Washington, D.C. The missions of the units in the Military District of Washington include ceremonial tasks as well as a combat role in the defense of the National Capital Region.

The Military District of Washington also represents the U.S. Army in the Joint Task Force – National Capital Region (JTF-NCR), as well as oversight of all ceremonial operations in Arlington National Cemetery.

The current Commanding General of the Military District of Washington is Major General Antoinette Gant. The Commanding General, Chief of Staff, and Command Sergeant Major of the Military District of Washington hold the same positions at the JTF-NCR, which supervises military planning for the defense of the National Capital Region.

== History ==
The MDW can trace its origin back to the American Civil War when it was formed on 12 March 1862, as the Military District of Washington, and it included the areas of the District of Columbia, Alexandria, Virginia, and Fort Washington, Maryland. It was first under the command of Bvt. Major General James S. Wadsworth. It became part of the Department of Washington under the 22nd Army Corps on 2 February 1863 and it was disbanded in 1869.

The MDW was reformed in 1921 when the War Department created the District of Washington. Today MDW is one of the Army's major commands. Its installations include Fort McNair, the nation's third-oldest military post still in use, and Fort Myer, Gen. Philip Sheridan's cavalry showplace and site of the first military aircraft flight.

The District of Washington initially included Fort Washington, Md., Fort Hunt, Va., the District of Columbia and Fort Myer. With the dissolution of the District of Washington in 1927, the commanding general of the 16th Infantry Brigade at Fort Hunt became responsible for conducting military ceremonies and administering discipline to service members in the nation's capital. In 1936, the Washington Provisional Brigade was organized, thus relieving the 16th Infantry Brigade. The Provisional Brigade was formed around elements of the 12th Infantry Regiment, 3rd Cavalry Regiment, 10th Cavalry Regiment and the 16th Field Artillery Regiment.

In 1942, about five months after the U.S. entered World War II, the War Department created the U.S. Army Military District of Washington to plan for a ground defense of the nation's capital.

MDW was headquartered during those years in "temporary" buildings at Gravelly Point, Virginia., near Washington National Airport. It moved to Second Street, S.W., in Washington, D.C., in the early 1960s, and to its present headquarters at Fort Lesley J. McNair in 1966.

During the World War II era, MDW was gradually reorganized as a service-and-support command. One of MDW's main responsibilities was servicing the newly built Pentagon through the Army Headquarters commandant. The United States Army Band, "Pershing's Own," also became an integral part of the command's ceremonial mission during this period.

At the end of World War II, the 3rd Infantry Regiment (The Old Guard) was deactivated in Germany. This regiment, the oldest U.S. infantry unit, was reactivated in 1948 and assigned to MDW to meet the command's tactical commitments and for military ceremonies.

Although MDW's mission has remained the same, it has gained, lost and regained various installations and support responsibilities over the years. Vint Hill Farms and Arlington Hall Station, both in Virginia, and Walter Reed Army Medical Center in Washington, D.C., were once part of MDW. Cameron Station and Davison Army Airfield, near Fort Belvoir, joined MDW in the 1950s.

In 1980 MDW gained responsibility for the administration and daily operation of Arlington National Cemetery, in addition to the ceremonial support the command has always provided.

In 1987 MDW's support responsibilities for the Pentagon were transferred to the Washington Headquarters Services. Fort Belvoir became a major subordinate command in 1988.

In 1992 Davison Aviation Command was reorganized as the Operational Support Airlift Command, with responsibilities for fixed-wing Army aircraft support throughout the United States. Additionally, they provide rotary-wing (helicopter) support to Army leadership and distinguished officials in the National Capital Region.

In April 1993, MDW reorganized its MACOM staff and the Fort Myer Military Community formed a garrison staff to support Forts Myer and McNair, and Cameron Station.

On 1 October 1993, Fort Meade, and Fort Ritchie in Maryland, and A.P. Hill in Virginia joined the MDW family of installations. The command more than doubled in size as MDW went from four posts totaling 9,802 acres (39.67 km^{2}) to eight posts totaling 91,889 acres (371.86 km^{2}). The number of service members and civilians on MDW installations also increased from 16,166 to 61,531.

Cameron Station officially closed on 30 September 1995. Most of the organizations were relocated to either Fort Belvoir or Fort Myer.

Fort Hamilton, New York, became the newest member of MDW's family of installations when it was transferred to MDW from U.S. Army Forces Command 6 October 1997. The post is 172 years old.

On 10 June 2010, Secretary of the Army John M. McHugh rescinded MDW's responsibility for the administration and daily operation of Arlington National Cemetery. However, MDW still maintains ceremonial support for funerals and guarding the Tomb of the Unknown Soldier.

=== Ceremonial duties ===
The Military District of Washington is responsible for organizing state funerals, including those of former presidents. The Military District of Washington is also responsible for organizing Presidential inaugurations every four years, as well as championship parades for all of Washington's sports teams.

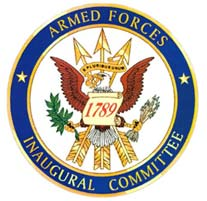

From 1953 to 2003 the Armed Forces Inaugural Committee (AFIC) coordinated military support to the Presidential Inaugural Committee (PIC) and the Joint Congressional Committee on Inaugural Ceremonies (JCCIC). Beginning in 2003, the AFIC mission was assumed by the Joint Task Force-National Capitol Region (JTF-NCR).

The military has participated in inaugural day ceremonies since President George Washington.

The ten-day celebration surrounding the second inauguration of Richard Nixon in 1973 was impacted by the death of former President Lyndon B. Johnson, just two days into Nixon's new term. The remainder of the ceremonies were cancelled, as the military would have to deal with the state funeral for the nation's 36th president. Because of the inauguration, all the military men who participated in the inauguration participated in the state funeral.

== Organization ==
Current units commanded by the district include;

- The United States Army Band "Pershing's Own"
- The United States Army Field Band
- Regimental Headquarters and Headquarters Company, 3rd U.S. Infantry Regiment (The Old Guard)
  - Caisson Platoon
  - Commander-in-Chief's Guard
  - Continental Color Guard
  - The Old Guard Fife and Drum Corps
  - Presidential Salute Battery
  - Tomb of the Unknown Soldier Sentinels
  - The United States Army Drill Team
  - 1st Battalion, 3rd U.S. Infantry Regiment (The Old Guard) (Infantry)
    - Headquarters and Headquarters Company, 1st Battalion
    - B Company
    - C Company
    - D Company
    - H Company
    - 1st Battalion Chaplains Group
  - 4th Battalion, 3rd U.S. Infantry Regiment (The Old Guard) (Ceremonial)
    - Headquarters and Headquarters Company, 4th Battalion
    - 529th Regimental Support Company
    - A Company
    - Honor Guard Company
    - 289th Military Police Company
    - Regimental Fife and Drum Corps
- United States Army Transportation Agency
- The Army Aviation Brigade
  - United States Army Priority Air Transportation (Jet) Detachment
  - 12th Aviation Battalion - Sikorsky UH-60 Black Hawk VH-60M "Gold Top" variants are heavily modified UH-60Ms used for executive transport. Members of the Joint Chiefs, Congressional leadership, and other DoD personnel are flown on these exclusively by Alpha company 12th Aviation Battalion at Fort Belvoir, Virginia.
    - 911th Technical Rescue Engineer Company
  - Army Aviation Brigade Airfield Division

A Priority Air Transport helicopter was involved in the 29 January, 2025 Potomac River mid-air collision.

== Joint Service Honor Guard ==
The Joint Service Honor Guard is composed of personnel from the official honor guard (see also honour guard) units of each uniformed DOD branch. The honor guard units of each of the services are located in or near Washington D. C., and they form the ad-hoc battalion sized unit to represent the entire armed forces at numerous ceremonies of state, mostly State visits to the United States and the Armed Forces Farewell ceremony to the outgoing President before the United States presidential inauguration in January.

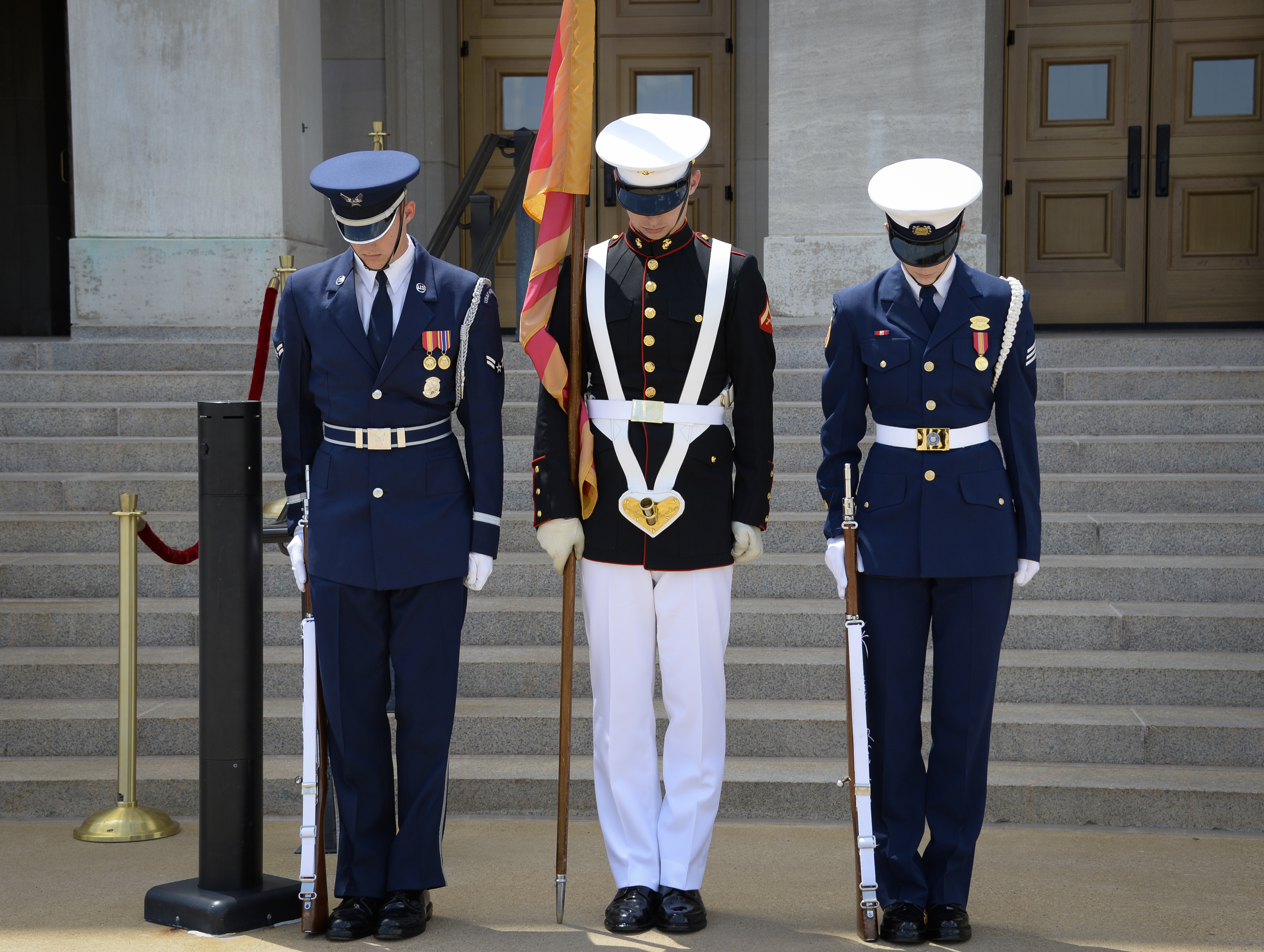
Members of the Joint Service Honor Guard of the National Capital Region and the Department of Defense.

The following units make up the battalion:

- Echo Company, 4th Battalion, 3rd U.S. Infantry Regiment (The Old Guard)
- Ceremonial Company A, Marine Barracks Washington
- United States Navy Ceremonial Guard
- United States Air Force Honor Guard
- United States Coast Guard Ceremonial Honor Guard

Since the early 1940s, the 3rd United States Infantry Regiment (The Old Guard) has served as the official escort to the President, additionally providing security for the National Capital Region during national/local emergencies.

Operationally attached to the ad-hoc battalion are five of the military bands and two field music formations designated as premier ensembles of the entire Armed Forces:

- United States Marine Band
- United States Marine Drum and Bugle Corps
- United States Navy Band
- The United States Army Band
- Old Guard Fife and Drum Corps
- United States Air Force Band
- United States Coast Guard Band

These bands take turns whenever they are assigned to perform in state ceremonies with the exception of the USMDBC, which, given that it reports directly to the office of the Commandant of the Marine Corps, can only be assigned on similar events upon his discretion. The 257th Army Band of the District of Columbia National Guard is occasionally attached if any of the bands are absent.

== Insignia ==
=== Shoulder sleeve insignia ===
- Description: On a blue oval 2 7/8 inches in height fimbriated white within a 3/16-inch red border, issuing from a green mount in base fimbriated argent, the Washington Monument of the last superimposed by a red double-handed sword bendwise, fimbriated white, hilt and pommel yellow; all fimbriations 1/32-inch.
- Symbolism:

The functions of the organization are indicated by the double-handed sword, symbolic of protection, over the Washington Monument, representing the area concerned.
The blue represents the Navy and the Infantry; the scarlet the Field Artillery, Coast Artillery and Engineers, and the green and gold the Military Police.

- Background:
1. The shoulder sleeve insignia was originally approved for Military District of Washington on 1942-09-26
2. Redesignated for US Army Military District of Washington on 1971-07-21.

=== Distinctive unit insignia ===
- Description: A gold color metal and enamel device 1 3/16 inches in height overall consisting of an oval its upper half blue and containing a gold star in the center, the lower half divided into seven stripes alternately white and red. Bordering the bottom of the oval, a semicircular gold scroll inscribed with the words HAEC PROTEGIMUS in black, the scroll ends folded twice and forked with the points up below a border of gold oak leaves terminating at either side of a gold acorn with point up at top center, crossed in front two swords their gold hilts emerging from the folds of the scroll and their white blades terminating outside the oak leaf border.
- Symbolism:

The background of the National colors refers to the seat of the government, which lies within the Military District of Washington, with the dome-shaped upper part suggesting the Capitol building.
The Command's responsibilities of conducting ceremonies for the President of the United States and foreign dignitaries, Medal of Honor presentations, military funerals and guarding the Tomb of the Unknown Soldier are represented by the gold star.
The oak leaves symbolize strength and courage and the crossed swords indicate the command's mission to defend the Nation's Capital.
The motto translates to "This We Guard."

- Background:
1. The distinctive unit insignia was originally approved for Headquarters, Military District of Washington on 1968-09-06;
2. Revised to delete Headquarters from the designation on 1968-10-28;
3. Redesignated for US Army Military District of Washington on 1971-07-21.

== List of commanders ==
No.	Commander		Term		
No.	Portrait	Name	Took office	Left office	Term length
–	James S. Wadsworth	Brigadier General; James S. Wadsworth (1807–1864)	17 March 1862	7 September 1862	174 days
–	Harry Hill Bandholtz	Brigadier General; Harry Hill Bandholtz	1 September 1921	4 November 1923	~2 years, 64 days
–	Hamilton S. Hawkins III	Brigadier General; Hamilton S. Hawkins III (1872–1951)	5 November 1923	12 February 1924	99 days
–	Samuel D. Rockenbach	Brigadier General; Samuel D. Rockenbach (1869–1952)	12 February 1924	12 July 1927	3 years, 150 days
–	George C. Barnhardt	Brigadier General; George C. Barnhardt (1868–1930)	31 July 1927	23 September 1927	73 days
–	Guy V. Henry	Colonel; Guy V. Henry (1875–1967); Acting	23 September 1927	30 September 1927	7 days
–	Thomas Q. Donaldson	Brigadier General; Thomas Q. Donaldson (1864–1934)	1 October 1927	21 December 1927	81 days
–	Herbert O. Williams	Brigadier General; Herbert O. Williams	21 December 1927	6 May 1930	2 years, 136 days
–	Alfred T. Smith	Colonel; Alfred T. Smith (1874–1939); Acting	6 May 1930	7 October 1930	154 days
–	Edgar T. Collins	Brigadier General; Edgar T. Collins (1873–1933)	7 October 1930	1 February 1932	~1 year, 117 days
–	James M. Petty	Colonel; James M. Petty; Acting	1 February 1932	1 April 1932	60 days
–	Perry L. Miles	Brigadier General; Perry L. Miles (1873–1961)	1 April 1932	1 April 1936	~4 years, 0 days
–	Charles D. Roberts	Brigadier General; Charles D. Roberts (1873–1966)	1 April 1936	30 June 1937	~1 year, 90 days
–	Dana T. Merrill	Brigadier General; Dana T. Merrill (1876–1957)	1 July 1937	30 November 1938	~1 year, 152 days
–	Maxwell Murray	Brigadier General; Maxwell Murray (1885–1948)	1 December 1938	23 June 1940	~1 year, 205 days
–	Charles B. Lyman	Lieutenant Colonel; Charles B. Lyman (1888–1981); Acting	23 June 1940	10 July 1940	~17 days
–	Bruce Magruder	Brigadier General; Bruce Magruder (1882–1953)	10 July 1940	10 October 1940	~92 days
–	John N. Greely	Brigadier General; John N. Greely (1885–1965)	10 October 1940	28 July 1941	~291 days
–	Albert L. Cox	Brigadier General; Albert L. Cox (1883–1964)	28 July 1941	14 May 1942	~290 days
–	John T. Lewis	Major General; John T. Lewis (1894–1983)	14 May 1942	6 September 1944	2 years, 115 days
–	Charles F. Thompson	Major General; Charles F. Thompson (1882–1954)	6 September 1944	14 July 1945	311 days
–	Robert N. Young	Brigadier General; Robert N. Young (1900–1964)	14 July 1945	15 June 1946	336 days
–	Claude B. Ferenbaugh	Brigadier General; Claude B. Ferenbaugh (1899–1975)	15 June 1946	6 November 1947	1 year, 144 days
–	Hobart R. Gay	Major General; Hobart R. Gay (1894–1983)	6 November 1947	6 August 1949	1 year, 273 days
–	John T. Cole	Colonel; John T. Cole (1895–1975); Acting	6 August 1949	28 February 1950	173 days
–	Thomas W. Herren	Major General; Thomas W. Herren (1895–1985)	1 March 1950	8 March 1952	2 years, 7 days
–	Edwin K. Wright	Major General; Edwin K. Wright (1898–1983)	8 March 1952	26 February 1954	1 year, 355 days
–	John H. Stokes Jr.	Major General; John H. Stokes Jr. (1895–1968)	15 April 1954	5 February 1956	1 year, 296 days
–	John G. Van Houten	Major General; John G. Van Houten (1904–1974)	6 February 1956	May 1959	~3 years, 84 days
–	Charles K. Gailey Jr.	Major General; Charles K. Gailey Jr. (1901–1966)	May 1959	May 1961	~2 years, 0 days
–	Paul A. Gavan	Major General; Paul A. Gavan (1903–1979)	May 1961	July 1963	~2 years, 61 days
–	Philip C. Wehle	Major General; Philip C. Wehle (1906–1978)	August 1963	August 1965	~2 years, 0 days
–	Curtis J. Herrick	Major General; Curtis J. Herrick (1909–1971)	2 October 1965	31 May 1967	1 year, 241 days
–	Charles S. O'Malley Jr.	Major General; Charles S. O'Malley Jr. (1913–1993)	1 June 1967	1 September 1969	2 years, 92 days
–	Roland M. Gleszer	Major General; Roland M. Gleszer (1915–2000)	1 September 1969	April 1972	~2 years, 213 days
–	James B. Adamson	Major General; James B. Adamson (1921–2003)	1 May 1972	12 November 1973	1 year, 195 days
–	Frederic E. Davison	Major General; Frederic E. Davison (1917–1999)	12 November 1973	22 September 1974	314 days
–	Ronald J. Fairfield Jr.	Major General; Ronald J. Fairfield Jr. (1919–2014)	22 September 1974	1 August 1975	313 days
–	Robert G. Yerks	Major General; Robert G. Yerks (1928–2021)	1 August 1975	15 July 1977	1 year, 348 days
–	Kenneth E. Dohleman	Major General; Kenneth E. Dohleman (1926–2018)	1 August 1977	1979	~2 years, 0 days
–	Robert Arter	Major General; Robert Arter (born 1929)	1979	1981	~2 years, 0 days
–	Jerry R. Curry	Major General; Jerry R. Curry (1932–2020)	1981	1983	~2 years, 0 days
–	John L. Ballantyne III	Major General; John L. Ballantyne III (born 1931)	1983	1986	~3 years, 0 days
–	Donald C. Hilbert	Major General; Donald C. Hilbert (1933–2020)	1986	1990	~4 years, 0 days
–	William F. Streeter	Major General; William F. Streeter (born 1937)	1990	20 May 1993	~3 years, 0 days
–	Fred A. Gorden	Major General; Fred A. Gorden (born 1940)	20 May 1993	29 August 1995	2 years, 101 days
–	Robert F. Foley	Major General; Robert F. Foley (born 1941)	29 August 1995	13 August 1998	2 years, 349 days
–	Robert R. Ivany	Major General; Robert R. Ivany (born 1947)	13 August 1998	28 July 2000	1 year, 350 days
–	James T. Jackson	Major General; James T. Jackson	28 July 2000	2003	~3 years, 0 days
–	Galen B. Jackman	Major General; Galen B. Jackman (born 1951)	2003	21 July 2005	~2 years, 0 days
–	Guy C. Swan III	Major General; Guy C. Swan III (born 1954)	21 July 2005	5 June 2007	1 year, 319 days
–	Richard J. Rowe Jr.	Major General; Richard J. Rowe Jr.	5 June 2007	23 June 2009	2 years, 18 days
–	Karl R. Horst	Major General; Karl R. Horst	23 June 2009	3 June 2011	1 year, 345 days
–	Michael Linnington	Major General; Michael Linnington (born 1958)	3 June 2011	24 June 2013	2 years, 21 days
–	Jeffrey S. Buchanan	Major General; Jeffrey S. Buchanan	24 June 2013	9 June 2015	1 year, 350 days
–	Bradley Becker	Major General; Bradley Becker	9 June 2015	28 April 2017	1 year, 323 days
–	Michael L. Howard	Major General; Michael L. Howard	28 April 2017	4 June 2019	2 years, 37 days
–	Omar Jones	Major General; Omar Jones	4 June 2019	8 June 2021	2 years, 4 days
–	Allan Pepin	Major General; Allan Pepin	8 June 2021	1 June 2023	1 year, 358 days
–	Trevor J. Bredenkamp	Major General; Trevor J. Bredenkamp	1 June 2023	21 July 2025	2 years, 50 days
–	Antoinette R. Gant	Major General; Antoinette R. Gant	21 July 2025	Incumbent	1 year, 54 days

== See also ==
- Naval District Washington
- Air Force District of Washington
- Washington Headquarters Services
- Pentagon Force Protection Agency
- Protective Services Battalion
- Joint Task Force – National Capital Region
