= Robert Arter =

United States Army general

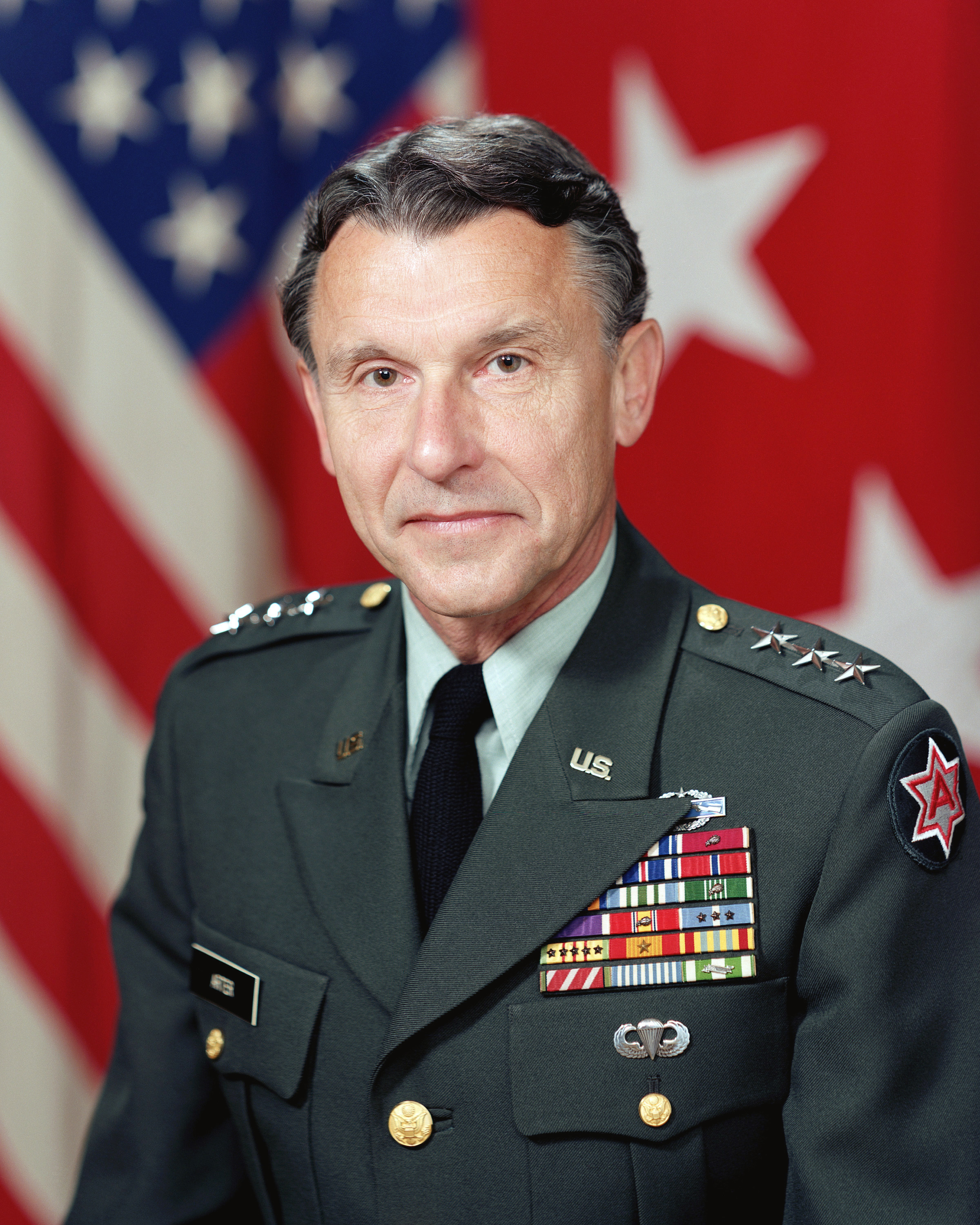
- Lieutenant General Robert Arter
- Born: September 7, 1929 (age 97); Massillon, Ohio, U.S.
- Military career
- Allegiance: United States
- Branch: United States Army
- Service years: 1950–1986
- Rank: Lieutenant General
- Commands: Sixth United States Army; United States Army Military District of Washington; 1st Brigade, 101st Airborne Division; 1st Battalion, 506th Airborne Infantry Regiment
- Conflicts: Korean War; Vietnam War
- Awards: Army Distinguished Service Medal; Silver Star; Legion of Merit (2); Distinguished Flying Cross; Bronze Star Medal; Purple Heart
- Other work: Civilian Aide to the Secretary of the Army

Robert Arter (born September 7, 1929) is a retired United States Army lieutenant general and former commanding general of the Sixth United States Army.

Born and raised in Massillon, Ohio, Arter graduated from Washington High School in 1946. He was commissioned a second lieutenant of Infantry from Ohio University in 1950 after completing a B.S. degree in personnel management. Arter later earned an M.S. degree in public administration from Shippensburg State College.

In 1952, Arter served with the 35th Regimental Combat Team, 25th Infantry Division, in Korea. From 1956 to 1960, after attending the Infantry Officer Advanced Course, he was assigned as an operations officer for the Infantry School. Upon completion of the United States Air Force Air Command and Staff College in 1962, he held numerous command and staff positions before being sent to the Republic of Vietnam. In 1968, he assumed command of the 1st Battalion, 506th Airborne Infantry Regiment, 101st Airborne Division (Airmobile). He returned to Vietnam in 1971 to command the 1st Brigade, 101st Airborne Division.

Arter was promoted to brigadier general in 1973 and became the Commanding General of the Third ROTC Region. From 1975 to 1979, he was the Deputy Commanding General, United States Training Center and Fort Ord; Assistant Division Commander, 7th Infantry Division; and Deputy Commandant, United States Army Command and General Staff College. In 1979, Arter was promoted to major general and named Commanding General, United States Army Military District of Washington, followed by Commanding General, United States Army Military Personnel Center. Arter's last assignment was as Commanding General, Sixth United States Army.

== Awards and decorations ==
Combat Infantryman Badge with star (2 awards)
Basic Parachutist Badge

Army Distinguished Service Medal
Silver Star
Legion of Merit with one bronze oak leaf cluster
Distinguished Flying Cross
Bronze Star Medal
Purple Heart
Air Medal with "V" Device and bronze award numerals 14
Joint Service Commendation Medal
Army Commendation Medal with oak leaf cluster
National Defense Service Medal with one bronze service star
Korean Service Medal with three service stars
Vietnam Service Medal with five service stars
Army Service Ribbon
Vietnam Gallantry Cross with bronze star
Vietnam Armed Forces Honor Medal (1st Class)
Vietnam Staff Service Medal (1st Class)
United Nations Korea Medal
Vietnam Campaign Medal

Gen Arter was inducted in the inaugural class of the Phi Kappa Tau Hall of Fame and is a member of the Beta chapter of Phi Kappa Tau's Hall of Fame at Ohio University.

== Retirement ==
In 1991, Arter briefly held the position of Superintendent of Wentworth Military Academy. He served as president and CEO of the Armed Forces Bank in Fort Leavenworth, Kansas for a number of years and remains as a member of the board. In February 2006, he was named as a civilian aide to the Secretary of the Army for Kansas. In addition, Arter serves on the Governor’s Military Council for the state of Kansas.
