= Office of the Chief Legislative Liaison (United States Army) =

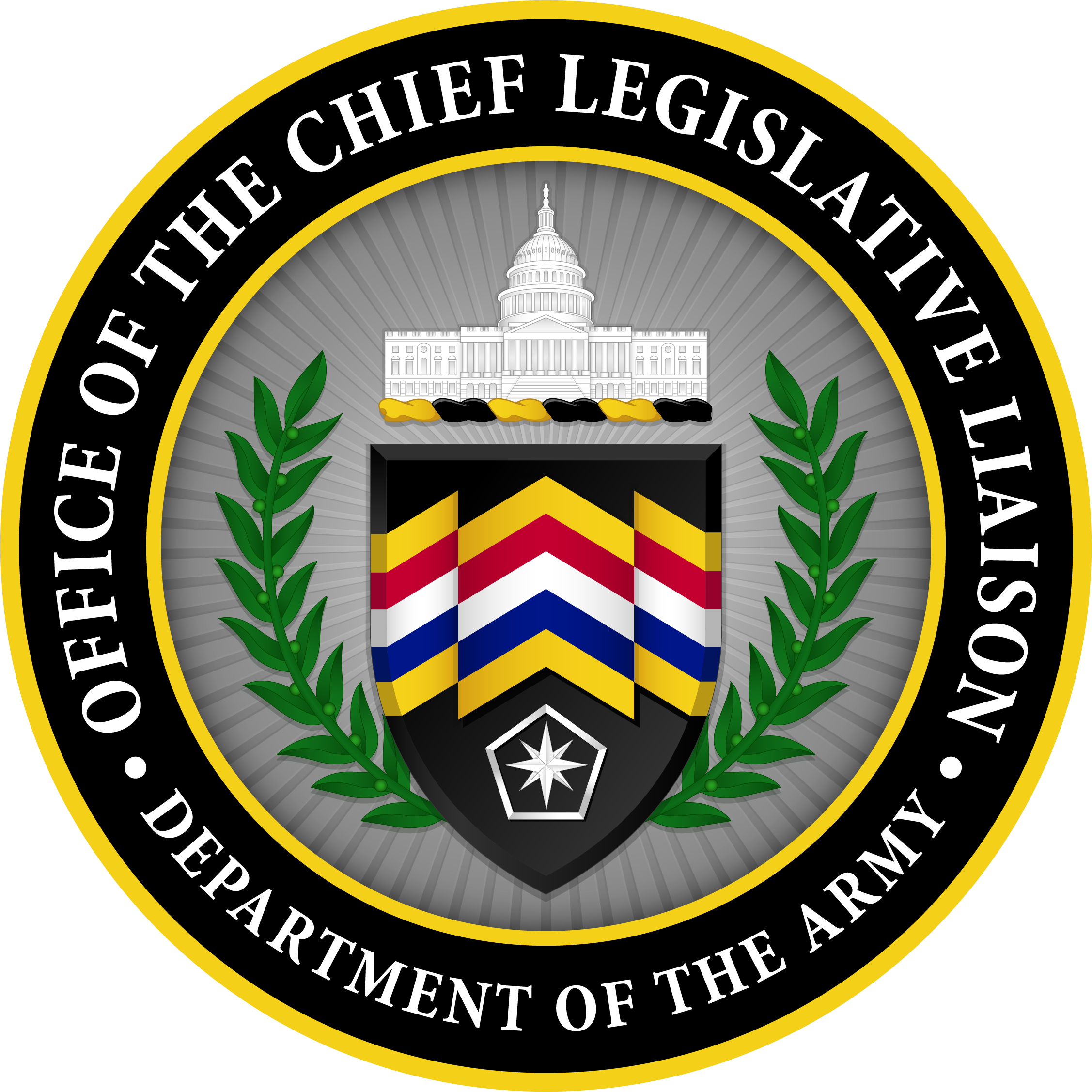
Seal of the Office of the Chief Legislative Liaison

The Office of the Chief Legislative Liaison (OCLL), an office of the U.S. Department of the Army. As described at the official website, "The Chief, Legislative Liaison (CLL) is directly responsible to the Secretary of the Army for legislative affairs, including formulating, coordinating, supervising, and executing the Army's Congressional policy and strategy. The CLL ensures the overall integration of the Army's efforts with Congress, develops comprehensive congressional engagement strategies for Army senior leaders, and disseminates critical information on all major Congressional activities." The Office’s House Liaison Division is the Office's only special division. The Chief of the House Liaison Division of the Office is the Department of Army's contact with that oversight body, which is of unique importance to the Army and the U.S. Executive Branch, because, uniquely, only that branch of the U.S. Congress, the U.S. House of Representatives, can originate funding legislation. The House Liaison Division of the U.S. Department of Army's Office of Chief Legislative Liaison is according to the Office’s website charged with serving "as the primary point of contact with Members of the U.S. House of Representatives, their staff, and all relevant committees" and "assisting Representatives and (their) staff in understanding policies, actions, operations, and requirements of the Army".

The Office was established in 1921 and its functions were thereafter in 1931 by memorandum order of the then U.S. secretary of war coordinated with the budget functions of the U.S. Army's Supply Division to form an Army Budget and Legislative Planning Branch (BLBP). Office was transferred to Office of the Secretary of the Army by General Order 15, Department of the Army, February 17, 1955.

== See also ==
Galen B. Jackman, U.S. Army Maj. Gen.
