= John G. Van Houten =

United States Army general

Major General John G. Van Houten
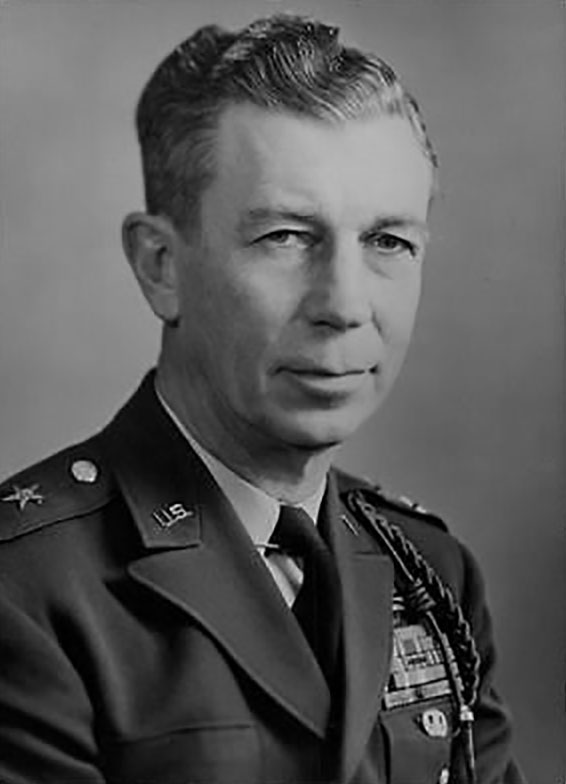
- Born: 11 March 1904; Georgia, U.S.
- Died: 23 February 1974 (aged 69)
- Military career
- Allegiance: United States of America
- Branch: United States Army
- Service years: 1926–1961
- Rank: Major General
- Service number: 016669
- Commands: 60th Infantry Regiment; 8th Infantry Division; United States Army Military District of Washington
- Conflicts: World War II; Korean War
- Awards: Distinguished Service Medal; Silver Star Medal; Legion of Merit; Bronze Star Medal (2); Air Medal

John Gibson Van Houten (1904-1974) served as a major general in the United States Army and was an important figure in the rebirth of the United States Army Rangers during the Korean War. He was a commanding officer of the 60th Infantry Regiment and Chief of staff of the 9th Infantry Division in World War II. At the start of the Korean War, he was picked by J. Lawton Collins to create an Airborne Ranger Training Program at Fort Benning in Georgia. Towards the end of his career he served as commander of the 8th Infantry Division and as Commander of the United States Army Military District of Washington.

Born in Georgia, Van Houten earned a B.S. in agriculture from the University of Georgia in 1926. He was commissioned as a reserve cavalry officer on May 31, 1926 and entered the regular army infantry on September 17, 1926. Van Houten graduated from the National War College in 1949.

Van Houten retired from active duty on June 30, 1961. After his death in 1974, he was interred at Fort Sam Houston National Cemetery. Van Houten was posthumously inducted into the U.S. Army Ranger Hall of Fame in 2006.
