= Michael L. Howard =

U.S. European Command deputy commander

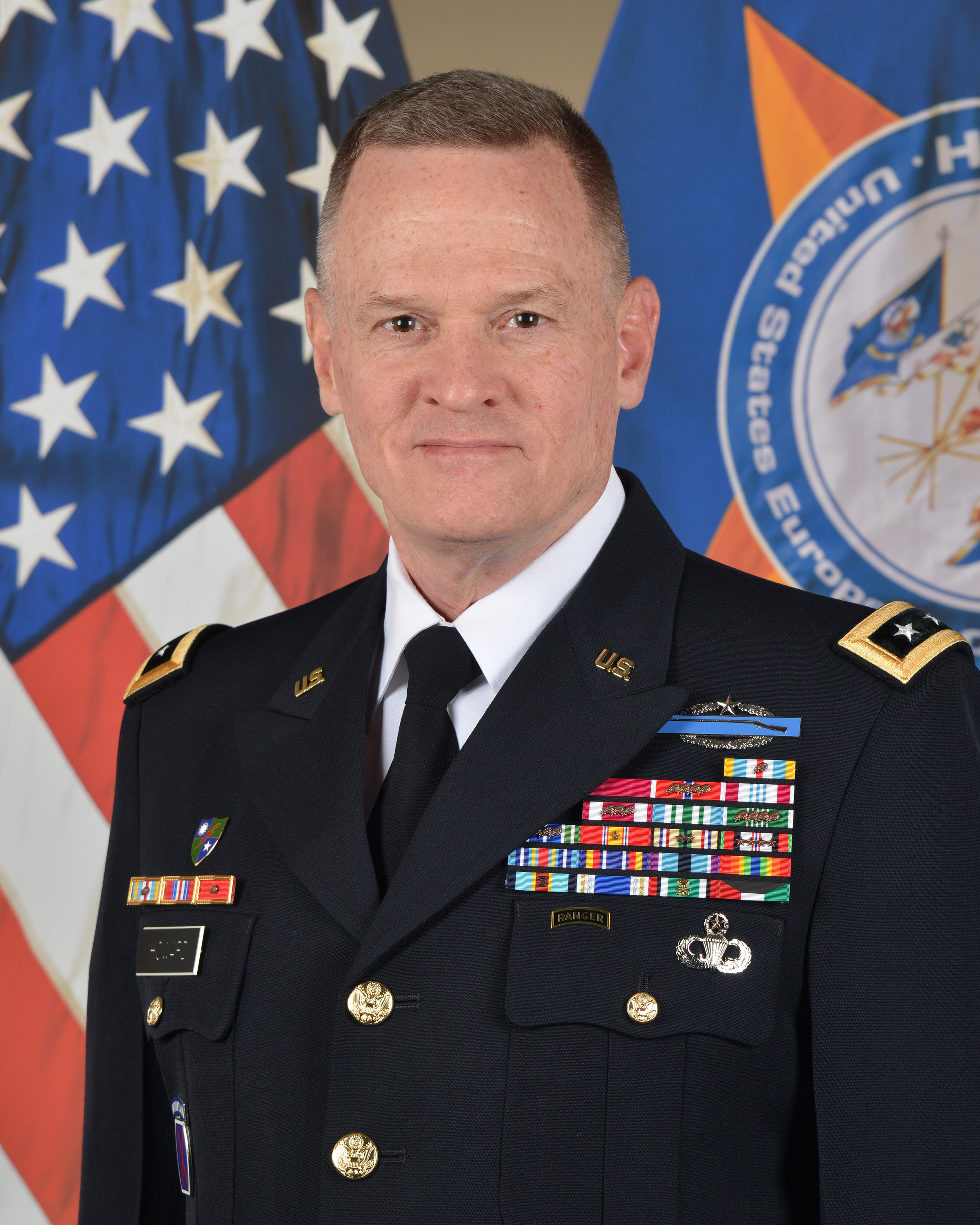
- Military career
- Allegiance: United States
- Branch: United States Army
- Service years: 1986–2022
- Rank: Lieutenant General
- Commands: United States Army Military District of Washington; Train Advise Assist Command – East; 4th Brigade Combat Team (Airborne), 25th Infantry Division; 1st Battalion, 87th Infantry Regiment
- Conflicts: Gulf War; War in Afghanistan
- Awards: Defense Superior Service Medal (2); Legion of Merit; Bronze Star Medal (5)

Michael L. Howard is a retired United States Army lieutenant general who last served as the deputy commander of the United States European Command. Prior to that, he was the command's operations director.

Howard earned a B.S. degree in biology from Mercer University in 1986. He later received an M.S. degree in national security strategic studies from the National War College.

Prior to his current European assignment, Howard served for two years as the commanding officer of the Military District of Washington (MDW). During that time, he also served as the official escort for former president George W. Bush and his family during the state funeral for his father, former President George H. W. Bush, in late 2018.

== Awards and decorations ==
Combat Infantryman Badge with Star (2nd award)
Ranger tab
Master Parachutist Badge
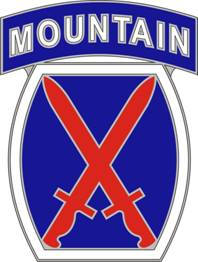
10th Mountain Division Combat Service Identification Badge
75th Ranger Regiment Distinctive Unit Insignia
11 Overseas Service Bars

Defense Superior Service Medal with one bronze oak leaf cluster
Legion of Merit
Bronze Star Medal with four oak leaf clusters
Defense Meritorious Service Medal
Meritorious Service Medal with three oak leaf clusters
Joint Service Commendation Medal
Army Commendation Medal with four oak leaf clusters
Army Achievement Medal with three oak leaf clusters
Joint Meritorious Unit Award with oak leaf cluster
Valorous Unit Award
Meritorious Unit Commendation with oak leaf cluster
National Defense Service Medal with one bronze service star
Southwest Asia Service Medal with two service stars
Afghanistan Campaign Medal with four service stars
Global War on Terrorism Expeditionary Medal
Global War on Terrorism Service Medal
Humanitarian Service Medal
Army Service Ribbon
Army Overseas Service Ribbon with bronze award numeral 3
NATO Meritorious Service Medal
Kuwait Liberation Medal (Saudi Arabia)
Kuwait Liberation Medal (Kuwait)

Military offices
Preceded by Andrew P. Poppas	Director of Force Management of the United States Army; 2016–2017	Succeeded by Brian J. Mennes
Preceded by Bradley A. Becker	Commanding General of the United States Army Military District of Washington; 2017–2019	Succeeded by Omar J. Jones IV
Preceded by Robert P. White	Director of Operations of the United States European Command; 2019–2020	Succeeded by Lance K. Landrum
Preceded by Stephen Twitty	Deputy Commander of the United States European Command; 2020–2022	Succeeded by Steven L. Basham
