= Pines Lake, New Jersey =

Populated place in Passaic County, New Jersey, US

- Census-designated place
- Location in Passaic County Location in New Jersey Location in the United States
- Coordinates: 40°59′30″N 74°15′44″W
- Country: United States
- State: New Jersey
- County: Passaic
- Township: Wayne

Area
  - Total: 1.64 sq mi (4.24 km^{2})
  - Land: 1.34 sq mi (3.48 km^{2})
  - Water: 0.29 sq mi (0.76 km^{2})
- Elevation: 246 ft (75 m)

Population (2020)
  - Total: 3,033
  - Density: 2,259.3/sq mi (872.31/km^{2})
- ZIP Code: 07470
- FIPS code: 34-58860
- GNIS feature ID: 0882022

Pines Lake is an unincorporated community and census-designated place (CDP) located on a lake in Wayne, in Passaic County, in the U.S. state of New Jersey. As of the 2020 census, Pines Lake had a population of 3,033. Pines Lake was started in the 1920s as a vacation community around a man-made lake approximately 1.5 miles (2.4 km) long and 0.5 miles (0.80 km) wide. Many of the original homes were modified log cabins. A large number of these log cabins, built of American chestnut in the 1930s, are still occupied as year-round homes. Gradually the neighborhood became approximately 500 high end to moderate suburban homes. It has a grammar school, Pines Lake School and its residents send their high-school-aged children to Wayne Hills High School.

An interesting feature of the lake is the one lane road that passes over the dam, giving a view down into "the Glen", a steep sided ravine which is maintained as a park. There are rare tiger salamanders and native ferns. Marine fossils have occasionally been found in the Glen and on properties surrounding the lake. An undeveloped area near the southern end of the lake has long been believed to contain an Indian burial ground.

The Lenape Native Americans lived in the area of Pines Lake prior to European settlement. Stone mounds and other signs of the Lenni-Lenape are visible in the forests and the undeveloped areas around Pines Lake. Many of the surrounding roads in Pines Lake are named after Indian tribes in honor of them. This includes Osceola Road, Iroquois Trail, Algonquin Trail, Mohawk Trail, and others.

Despite its name, there are very few natural pine trees around Pines Lake. The area is mostly forested in black oak, white oak, and red oak along with flowering dogwoods and American beech. There are groves of mature Eastern hemlocks that may have been mistaken for pine trees. The Glen is forested with mature oaks, hemlocks, and beech, including American sycamores along the stream banks.

Pines Lake has several community beaches on the lake and an active community life, centered on swimming, tennis, and sailing. One such beach is the Sunny Ridge Beach, at the foot of Sunny Ridge Road, which serves residents in the immediate vicinity. Catch and release fishing is offered to private association members. The lake is stocked with large-mouth bass, sunfish, and Northern pike, and is also home to channel catfish and yellow perch, among other fish species. The lake supports flocks of mallards, coots, swans and other ducks, herons, and waterfowl. On the weekend nearest July 4 each year a community celebration is held, including the "Baby" Parade—a costume parade for children walking, or on decorated bicycles, and on homemade floats—culminating in a beach-side picnic. Children living in Pines Lake are eligible to participate in the summer program, several weeks of supervised play and learning activities - such as swimming and sailing lessons - sponsored by the Pines Lake Association. Another large community event is the annual Lobster Bash sponsored by the Sailing Club which is always sold out. These and other events are held at the South Beach Pavilion, built in the 1980s. The local Pines Lake swimming team has a large following.

The Pines Lake community is also the location of Laurelwood Arboretum, a 30-acre (12 ha) botanically diverse property. Laurelwood features woodland trails and gardens, wildlife, two ponds, streams and hundreds of varieties of rhododendrons, azaleas and other unusual species of plants and trees. Gravel paths wind and connect through the Arboretum, making it an ideal destination for hikers, runners, birdwatchers, plant enthusiasts and photographers. Once a commercial nursery, Laurelwood Arboretum is now maintained as a public park through a partnership between the Township of Wayne and the non-profit organization Friends of Laurelwood Arboretum, Inc (FOLA).

== Demographics ==
Historical population
Census	Pop.	Note	%±
2020	3,033		—
U.S. Decennial Census 2020

Pines Lake was first listed as a census designated place in the 2020 U.S. census.

=== 2020 census ===
As of the 2020 census, Pines Lake had a population of 3,033. The median age was 50.5 years. 17.8% of residents were under the age of 18 and 25.8% of residents were 65 years of age or older. For every 100 females there were 94.7 males, and for every 100 females age 18 and over there were 92.3 males age 18 and over.

100.0% of residents lived in urban areas, while 0.0% lived in rural areas.

There were 1,096 households in Pines Lake, of which 28.9% had children under the age of 18 living in them. Of all households, 67.4% were married-couple households, 11.6% were households with a male householder and no spouse or partner present, and 17.5% were households with a female householder and no spouse or partner present. About 17.1% of all households were made up of individuals and 11.5% had someone living alone who was 65 years of age or older.

There were 1,131 housing units, of which 3.1% were vacant. The homeowner vacancy rate was 0.6% and the rental vacancy rate was 4.5%.

Pines Lakes CDP, New Jersey – Racial and ethnic composition Note: the US Census treats Hispanic/Latino as an ethnic category. This table excludes Latinos from the racial categories and assigns them to a separate category. Hispanics/Latinos may be of any race.
Race / Ethnicity (NH = Non-Hispanic)	Pop 2020	2020
White alone (NH)	2,478	81.70%
Black or African American alone (NH)	41	1.35%
Native American or Alaska Native alone (NH)	8	0.26%
Asian alone (NH)	220	7.25%
Native Hawaiian or Pacific Islander alone (NH)	0	0.00%
Other race alone (NH)	10	0.33%
Mixed race or Multiracial (NH)	69	2.27%
Hispanic or Latino (any race)	207	6.82%
Total	3,033	100.00%
