= 911th Technical Rescue Engineer Company =

US Army unit

911th Engineer Company
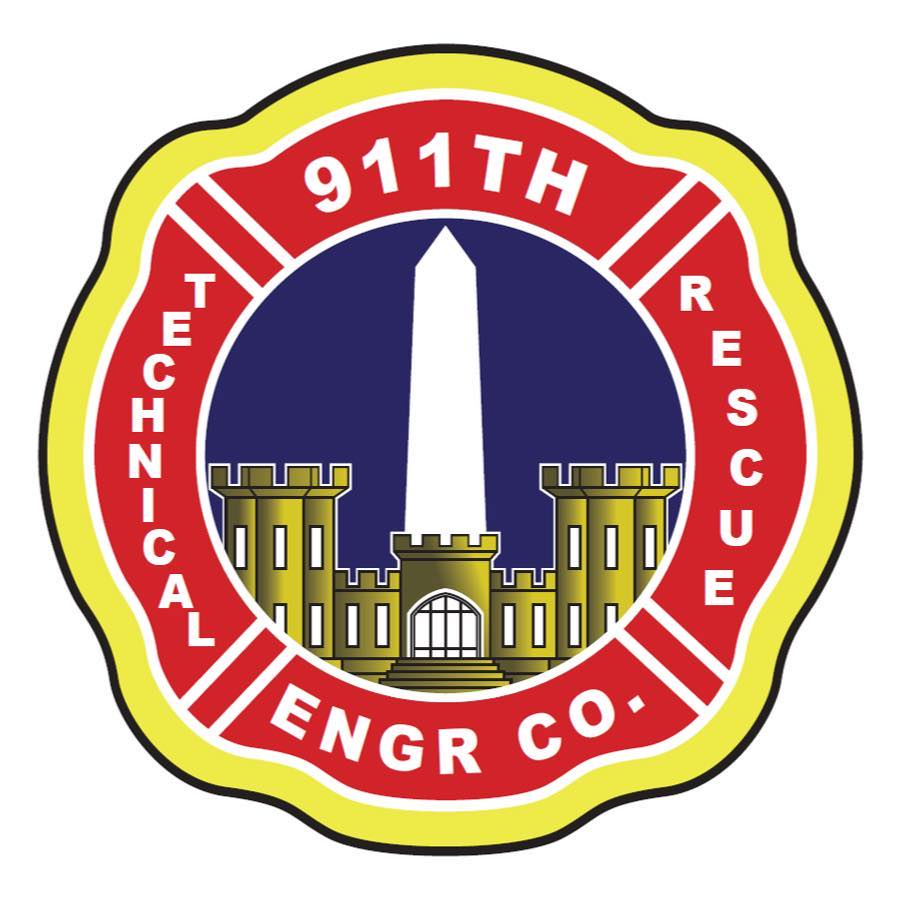
- Distinctive Unit Insignia of the 911th Engineering Company
- Active: 1989-2006 (MDW Engineer Company); 2006-present (911th Engineer Company)
- Country: United States
- Branch: United States Army
- Type: Urban search and rescue
- Role: Support
- Size: Company
- Headquarters: Fort Belvoir, Virginia

Insignia
- Military District of Washington Shoulder Sleeve Insignia

- Map symbol (MIL-STD-2525D)

The 911th Technical Rescue Engineer Company, formerly the MDW (Military District of Washington) Engineer Company, is a unit of the United States Army that specialises in technical rescue, particularly urban search and rescue (US&R). It is one of the only technical rescue companies in the United States Department of Defense. The 911th Technical Rescue Engineer Company is stationed at Fort Belvoir, Virginia. The company was originally founded in July 1989.

The 911th Technical Rescue Engineer Company is assigned to the 12th Aviation Battalion, Army Air Operations Group, United States Army Military District of Washington. The company is modeled after a Federal Emergency Management Agency (FEMA) Urban Search and Rescue Heavy Task Force. The company is certified in mine rescue and technical rescue, and specializes in trench, structural collapse, ropes, and confined space disciplines. It regularly trains with local, state, and federal first responders.

In 2001, the company responded immediately to the September 11 attacks on the Pentagon. The first sergeant and company commander moved the company to the disaster site without waiting for orders and spent 10 days engaged in search and rescue operations. The unit was re-designated as the 911th United States Army Technical Rescue Engineer Company on 11 September 2006, in memory of its historic role in the subsequent recovery effort.

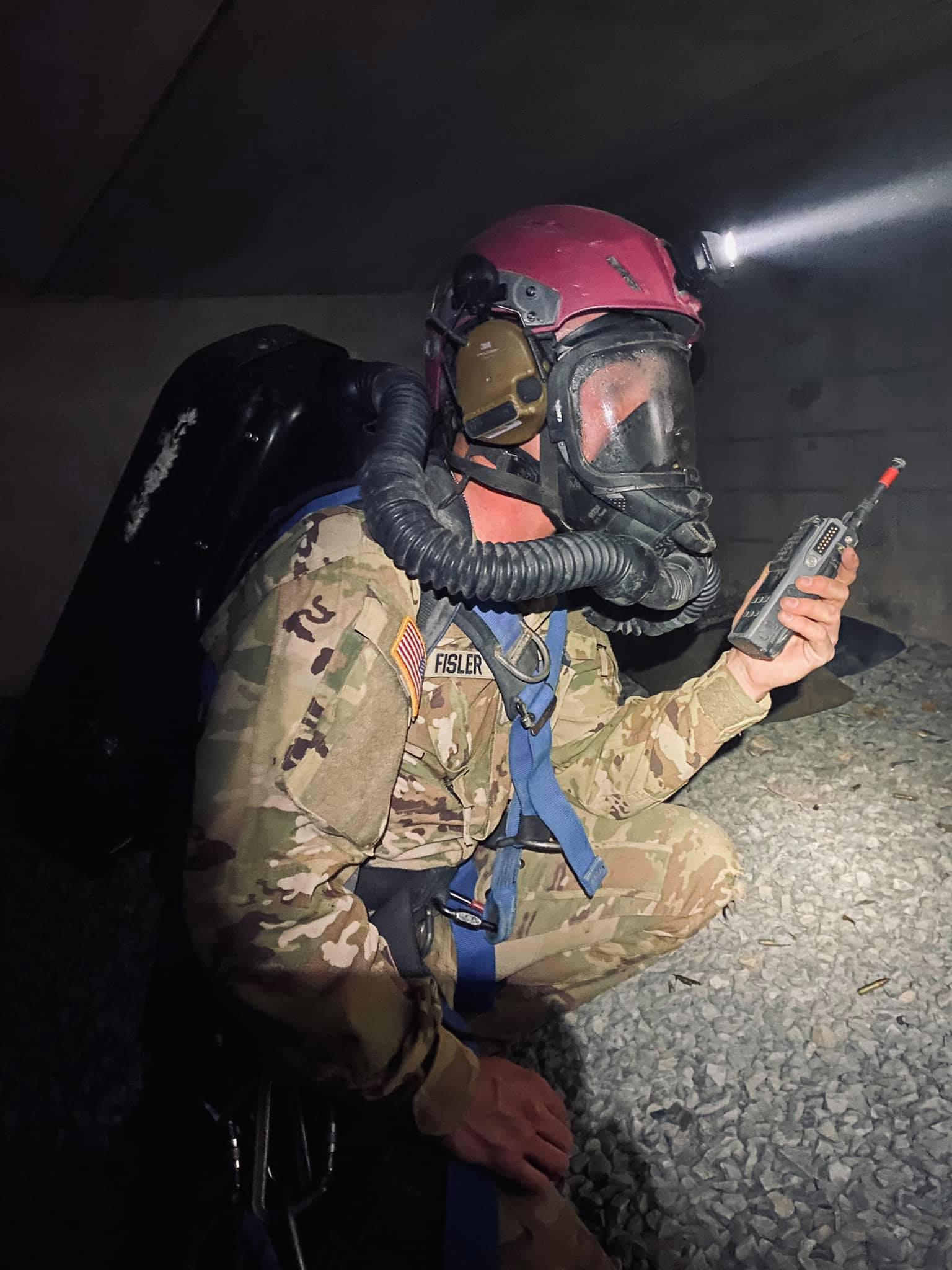
A soldier of the 911th conducting confined space search and rescue operations with a Drager rebreather.

The company was on standby during the first inauguration of Barack Obama in 2009, and since then has been prepared for numerous other events within the National Capital Region. In 2012 the company was equipped with heavy transport and dump trucks.
