= Galen B. Jackman =

American military officer

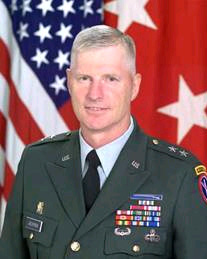
- U.S. Army Major General Galen B. Jackman as MDW Commander
- Born: Galen Bruce Jackman; 1951 (age 74–75); Scottsbluff, Nebraska, U.S.
- Military career
- Allegiance: United States
- Branch: United States Army
- Service years: 1973–2008
- Rank: Major General
- Commands: Commanding General, Military District of Washington/Joint Force Headquarters National Capital Region (2003–2005); Director of Operations (J-3), United States Southern Command (2001–2003); Commander, Ranger Training Brigade, Fort Benning (1994–1996)
- Conflicts: Operation Joint Forge, Bosnia-Herzegovina
- Awards: Distinguished Service Medal; Defense Superior Service Medal (1 Oak Leaf Cluster); Legion of Merit (1 OLC); Expert Infantryman Badge; Master Parachutist Badge; Air Assault Badge; Ranger Tab
- Other work: Raytheon Co. V.P., Army Programs, U.S. Business Development

Galen Bruce Jackman (born 1951) is a retired United States Army Major General. His last assignment in the Army was serving in the Pentagon as the Army's Chief Legislative Liaison. Before that assignment, he was the first commanding general of the Joint Force Headquarters National Capital Region (JFHQ-NCR), a dual-hatted role combined with commanding the Military District of Washington (MDW).

After his retirement from the U.S. Army, Jackman was hired in October 2008 by Raytheon Company, a Massachusetts-based defense contractor, as the vice-president over U.S. Army Programs, U.S. Business Development.

Jackman may be best known for his role during the seven days in June 2004 that marked the death and state funeral of Ronald Reagan. As the then-commanding general of the MDW (CG MDW), he became a known figure when he escorted former First Lady Nancy Reagan, the former president's wife.

== Early life ==
Jackman was born in August 1951 in Scottsbluff, Nebraska, and is one of at least three children born to Virgil and Maxine Jackman. At the time of his birth, Jackman's parents lived in the nearby city of Gering, where the family lived until they moved to Nebraska's capital, Lincoln, in 1965. Jackman graduated from Lincoln East High School in 1969.

== Military career ==
Jackman attended the University of Nebraska–Lincoln on an Army ROTC scholarship. While at the university he became an active member of the National Society of Pershing Rifles, an ROTC military fraternal organization known for including many who later became successful Army officers. Upon graduation he was commissioned into active duty in the U.S. Army in June 1973. His first duty assignment was with the 1st Battalion (ABN) 508th Infantry, 82nd Airborne Division, Fort Bragg, North Carolina, where he served as a rifle platoon leader, anti-tank platoon leader, company executive officer, and battalion adjutant. He next served with the 1st Battalion, 21st Infantry, 25th Infantry Division, Schofield Barracks, Hawaii, as a battalion S4, rifle company commander, and battalion S3. Following assignment as a Procurement Officer with the United States Missile Command, Redstone Arsenal, Alabama, he served at Fort Bragg as Procurement Officer, Squadron Executive Officer, and Support Squadron Commander in 1st Special Forces Operational Detachment-Delta (Airborne) (1st SFOD-D(A)), more commonly known as "Delta Force."

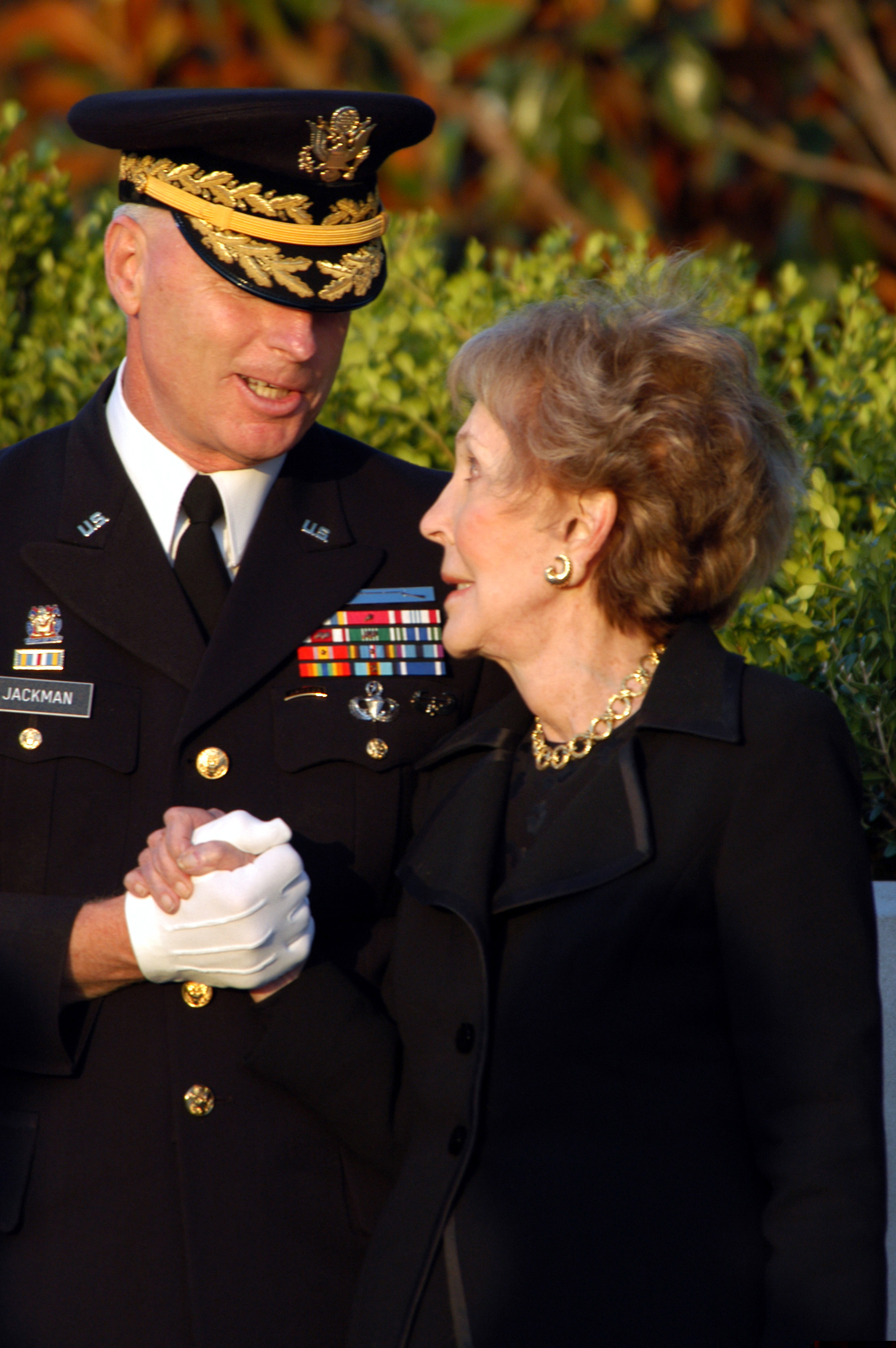
Army Major General Galen Jackman escorting former First Lady Nancy Reagan during the state funeral of Ronald Reagan, her husband, United States' 40th president

Jackman has commanded the 1st Battalion, 14th Infantry, 25th Infantry Division (Light); 2nd Brigade, 7th Infantry Division (Light), Fort Ord, California; and the Ranger Training Brigade, Fort Benning, Georgia. It was under then-Colonel Jackman's command at the Ranger Training Brigade that four Ranger candidates were killed in training on February 15, 1995, in the Florida swamps of Eglin Air Force Base. Killed were Captain Milton Palmer, Second Lieutenant Curt G. Sansoucie, Second Lieutenant Spencer D. Dodge, and Sergeant Norman Tillman. It was reported to be the worst incident in the Ranger School's 44-year history . Multiple accounts held the leadership climate, both at the command level and at the trainer level, responsible for the multiple errors that led to the training accident and deaths. Among the reasons named for the deaths include the command's lack of a proper risk assessment of the weather conditions surrounding the exercise before it took place and the Ranger trainers' decision to continue with the exercise despite poor training conditions and high water dangers. As a result of the accident, the Ranger School's command changed swamp training to include more food and sleep for trainees and now require trainers to go into potentially high water before their trainees do. No evidence exists to suggest that Jackman suffered any career-related consequences due to the incident.

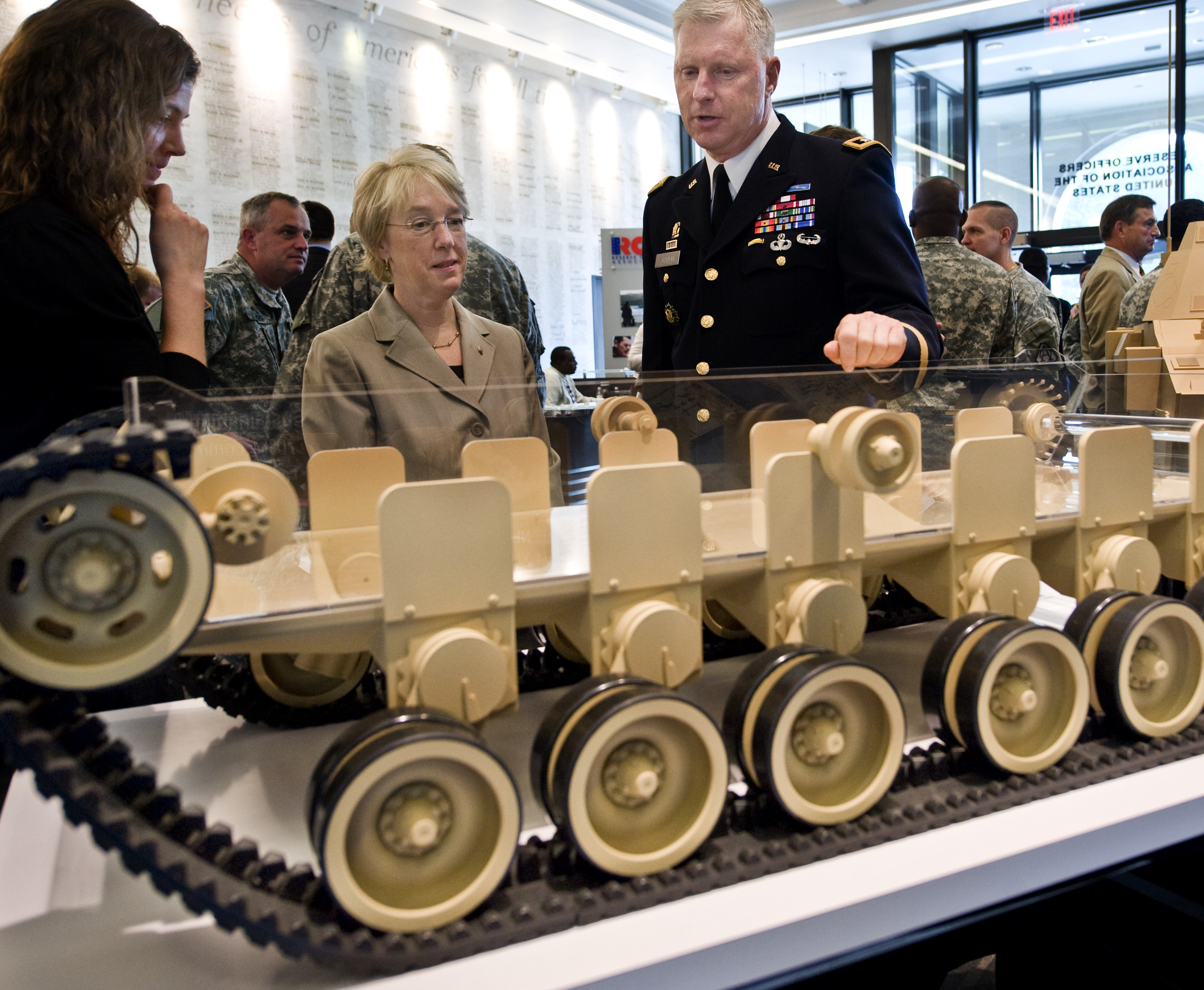
Jackman briefs Senator Patty Murray on the Manned Ground Vehicle program in Washington, D.C.

Following his command at the Ranger Training Brigade, Jackman served as the Director of Combined Arms and Tactics at the United States Army Infantry School at Fort Benning, as well as the Deputy J3 for Training and Readiness, United States Pacific Command (USPACOM), Hawaii. He was then assigned as Chief of Staff, 10th Mountain Division (Light Infantry), Fort Drum, New York, during which he participated as part of NATO's "Follow-on Force" in Operation Joint Forge, Bosnia-Herzegovina. Shortly thereafter he was made Assistant Division Commander for Support for the 10th Mountain Division.

Jackman served as Director of Operations, United States Southern Command (USSOUTHCOM) from 2001 to 2003, concentrating mostly on anti-drug and anti-terrorism endeavours. He took command of the MDW in mid-2003 and subsequently the JFHQ-NCR in late 2004 at its official inception. While in this dual command capacity, Jackman organized the proceedings and security for the dedication of the World War II Memorial on the National Mall and its accompanying WWII reunion, organized former President Ronald Reagan's state funeral, served as the official escort to the former President's wife, former First Lady Nancy Reagan, and served as commander of the Joint Task Force-Armed Forces Inaugural Committee for President George W. Bush's 2005 Presidential Inauguration. Jackman was assigned as the Army's Chief of Legislative Liaison on July 21, 2005. He retired from that position, and the U.S. Army after 35 years of service, in July 2008.

== Personal life ==
In 1982 Jackman married Cathy (née Dowd), herself the daughter of a retired Army officer. Cathy Jackman is originally from Fayetteville, North Carolina, and is a 1970 graduate of Terry Sanford High School. The Jackmans have two sons, David and Patrick. David Jackman is a graduate of Guilford College in Greensboro, North Carolina.

== Qualifications and decorations ==
=== Education and training ===
Jackman graduated from the University of Nebraska–Lincoln in 1973 with a Bachelor of Arts degree in history. After entering the U.S. Army in June, he completed the three-month Infantry Officer Basic Course, United States Army Infantry School, Fort Benning, Georgia, towards the end of 1973. He later completed the six-month Infantry Officer Advanced Course, also at the United States Army Infantry School, in 1978. In 1983, Jackman graduated after attending the US Army Command and General Staff College at Fort Leavenworth, Kansas, after nearly a year of study. That same year, he earned a Masters of Science degree in Acquisition/Procurement and Contract Management from the Florida Institute of Technology. Finally, Jackman attended the Industrial College of the Armed Forces, (Ft. Lesley J. McNair in SW Washington, D.C.), completing his year-long studies in 1992.

=== Dates of rank ===
- Second Lieutenant: 19 May 1973
- First Lieutenant: 6 June 1975
- Captain: 6 June 1977
- Major: 1 March 1984
- Lieutenant Colonel: 1 June 1989
- Colonel: 1 September 1993
- Brigadier General: 1 August 2000
- Major General: 1 October 2003

=== Decorations, awards and badges ===
- Distinguished Service Medal
- Defense Superior Service Medal with oak leaf cluster
- Legion of Merit with oak leaf cluster
- Defense Meritorious Service Medal
- Meritorious Service Medal with two oak leaf clusters
- Army Commendation Medal with two oak leaf clusters
- Army Achievement Medal
- Joint Meritorious Unit Award
- National Defense Service Medal with bronze star
- Armed Forces Expeditionary Medal with bronze star
- Humanitarian Service Medal
- Army Service Ribbon
- Overseas Service Ribbon with Arabic numeral 3
- NATO Medal
- Expert Infantryman Badge
- Master Parachutist Badge
- Air Assault Badge
- Ranger Tab
- Army Staff Identification Badge
