= Joint Task Force – National Capital Region =

Joint command of the US military

Joint Task Force – National Capital Region (JTF-NCR)
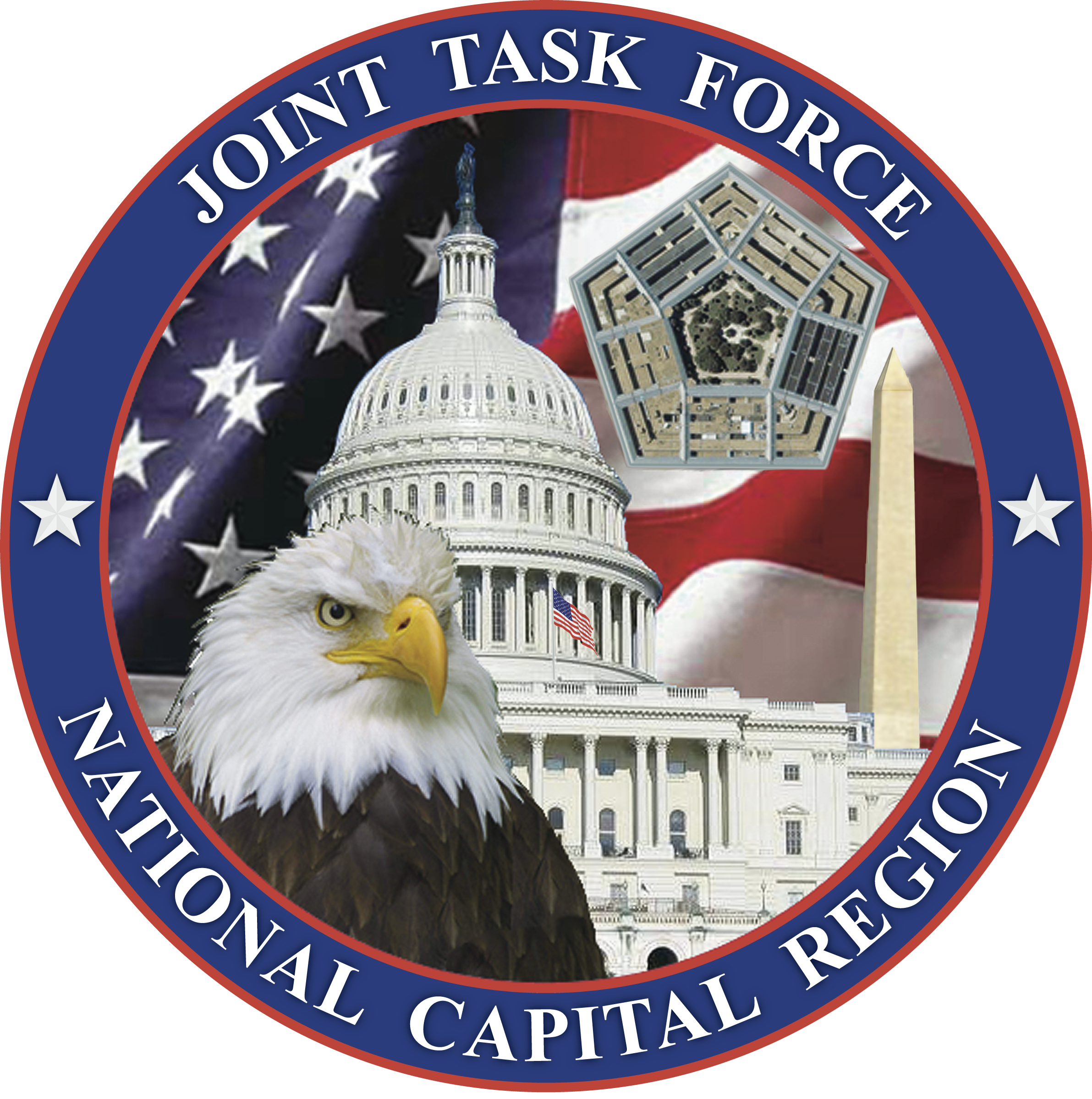
- Official seal of Joint Task Force – National Capital Region
- Active: September 22, 2004 – Present
- Country: United States
- Role: Anti-Terrorism; Counter-Terrorism; Homeland Defense; Homeland Security
- Part of: United States Northern Command
- Garrison/HQ: Fort Lesley J. McNair, Washington, D.C.
- Motto: Heed the Guardian

Commanders
- Commander: Major General Antoinette Gant
- Deputy Commander: Rear Admiral (Lower Half) David J. Faehnle
- Notable commanders: MG Galen B. Jackman, USA; MG Guy C. Swan III, USA

Joint Task Force – National Capital Region (JTF-NCR), formerly known as Joint Force Headquarters – National Capital Region (JFHQ-NCR), is a joint task force of the United States Department of Defense.

The task force:

"plans, coordinates, maintains situational awareness, and as directed, partners in the employment of forces to conduct continuity of government/operations, homeland defense, and civil support operations in the National Capital Region."

The National Capital Region includes the Washington D.C. area as well as surrounding counties in Virginia and Maryland. The JTF-NCR assists federal and local civilian agencies and disaster response teams in the event that the capital area's security is or possibly could be breached by acts of terrorism.

Officially activated on September 22, 2004, as JFHQ-NCR, the task force is part of United States Northern Command. It is based upon the headquarters of the Army's Military District of Washington with substantial augmentation from the other DOD services.

== History ==
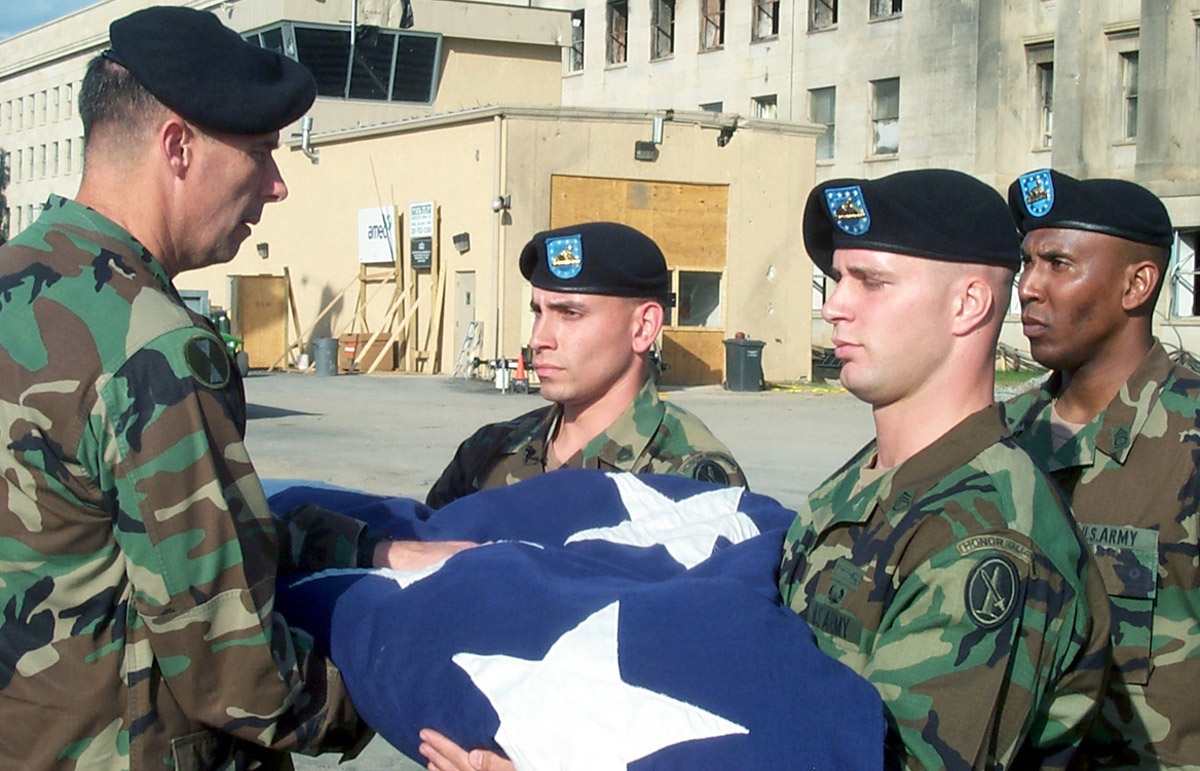
U.S. Army Soldiers from Company A, 3d Infantry Regiment, "The Old Guard," present the Military District of Washington Commander Major General Jim Jackson with the American flag that draped next to the Pentagon's impact site on October 11, 2001.

After the terrorist attacks on the World Trade Center and The Pentagon on September 11, 2001, military and civilian leaders recognized a need for strong cooperation and communication between agencies and national and local units in times of emergency or to prevent such attacks in the first place, something that had been severely lacking prior to that time. USNORTHCOM was subsequently established, taking command of several JTFs throughout the U.S. that are charged with homeland security. The Joint Force Headquarters for the National Capital Region was created for the sole purpose of preventing and responding to future terrorist attacks within the Washington, D.C. area and its surrounding cities and counties.

JFHQ-NCR officially came into being in September 2004. However, the unit had been operating in part for at least a year prior to its official creation. Major General James T. Jackson, the Military District of Washington (MDW) Commander at the time of the September 11th attacks, was the first to take hold of the concept of the new Headquarters and began to piece various aspects of it together, particularly seeing and responding to the need for a mobile command center and a more effective central command and control headquarters. When MG Galen B. Jackman replaced Jackson in 2003, Jackman solidified the role of JFHQ, commanding the response to various regional emergencies and National Special Security Events (NSSE), proving the potential of JFHQ-NCR. When the organization finally stood up in the fall of 2004—after having had a year of practice—it was fully operational and able to provide an effective answer to the NCR's growing security concerns.

== JTF-NCR in action ==
One of the Joint Task Force – National Capital Region's most essential tasks is to plan, coordinate and execute Department of Defense-approved support, as well as conduct liaison and coordination with the Presidential Inaugural Committee and the United States Congress Joint Committee on Inaugural Ceremonies. Immediately following the general election, the President-elect appoints the inaugural committee to plan, coordinate and host numerous celebrations and special events associated with the Presidential Inauguration. The joint committee, appointed by the House and the Senate, is responsible for conducting the swearing-in ceremony for the President-elect and Vice President–elect at the Capitol. Both of these committees historically request various forms of ceremonial support from Department of Defense.

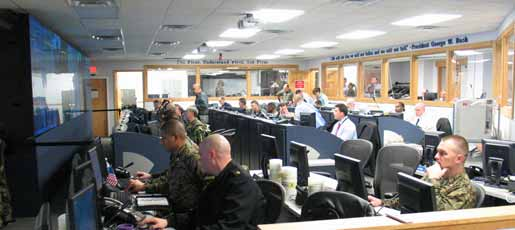
Personnel in the Joint Task Force National Capital Region's Joint Operations Center maintain security vigilance during George W. Bush's State of the Union Address, January 31, 2006.

When called upon to assist in a regional crisis or an NSSE (national events requiring security measures outlined and directed by the U.S. Secret Service), the JTF mobilizes to respond as quickly as possible and with as many component and interagency partners as applicable to address the issue at hand. Although the JTF is the single point of contact for military entities within the NCR, the JTF is ultimately guided by a lead agency (the agency that asked the JTF for assistance to begin with) and the directives of USNORTHCOM. The Joint Task Force participates in all inter-agency planning and conducts planning with joint partners in the National Capital Region. The joint force is expected to provide world-class ceremonial support for the Presidential Inauguration and the related official ceremonies and events throughout the inaugural period, continuing the tradition of military participation in the inauguration of the commander-in-chief, tracing back to the inauguration of George Washington in 1789.

The JTF-NCR has had several claims of success in the few years it has been operating. The first crisis that required what was then the JFHQ-NCR to activate its JTF occurred on February 2, 2004, when ricin was discovered in the Capitol Hill office mail room of Senate Majority Leader Bill Frist. The Marine Corps' Chemical Biological Incident Response Force (CBIRF) assisted in the situation and helped officials safely decontaminate the area.

Other times the JTF was activated in the NCR included the dedication of the World War II Memorial on the National Mall and its accompanying World War II reunion, former president Ronald Reagan's state funeral, President George W. Bush's 2005 Presidential Inauguration, President Bush's State of the Union Addresses, and the state funeral of former president Gerald Ford.

=== Joint Operations Center ===
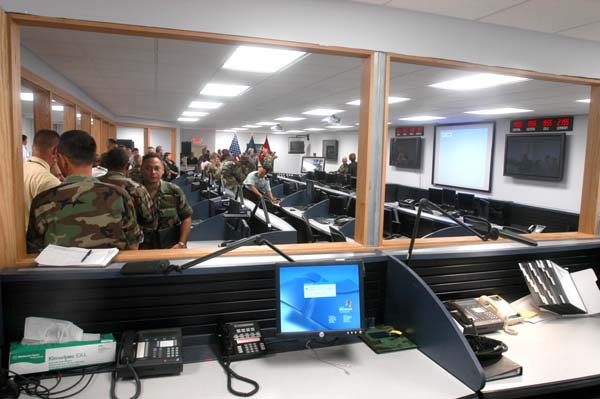
JFHQ-NCR's Joint Operations Center at its dedication at Ft. McNair, Washington, D.C., August 2, 2004.

The Joint Operations Center (JOC), dedicated a month and a half prior to the official activation of JFHQ-NCR, is the command and control center at the heart of the command. The JOC is housed in a building at Ft. McNair, designed with the latest in communication capabilities. The JOC boasts dozens of workstations, complete with secure and non-secure capability by way of phones, computer network access, and video teleconferencing for the entire center. The JOC is also "red phone" capable, Geospatial Information System ready, and fully integrated into the secure NORTHCOM communications system. In addition to the ability to communicate with various civilian and military units within the NCR, satellites provide the JOC with secure communication links to the Mobile Command Center and its smaller mobile cousin, "Dagger."

=== Mobile Command Post ===
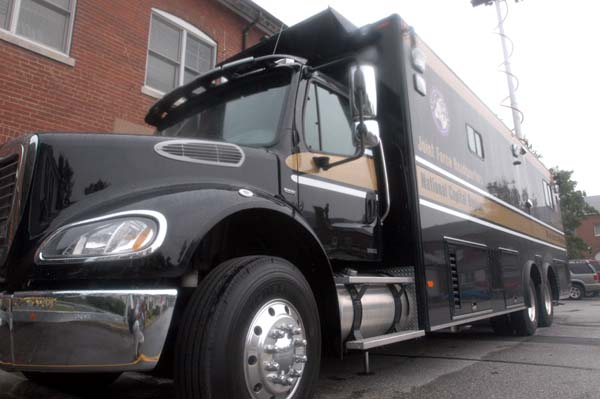
The Mobile Command Post of the JFHQ-NCR, parked inside Ft. McNair, August 2, 2004. The MCP allows the commander to communicate with all necessary components within the National Capital Region.

The Mobile Command Post (MCP), like the JOC, was instituted as a direct result of failures in communication capabilities at the time of the September 11th attacks. MG James Jackson needed to be in two places at once much of the time to coordinate recovery efforts at the Pentagon; however, "We had no vehicle then that was capable of anything more than a non-secure telephone connection. The EOC was basically an unclassified environment. (Jackson) made the commitment to secure a modern mobile command center and to fund it from the MDW budget," said Col. Egon Hawrylak (USA-Ret.), a civilian deputy operations officer who previously worked in the MDW operations center.

The MCP, a mobile, smaller version of the JOC, is situated on a 41-foot, 10-wheeled, truck chassis. The MCP was custom built for its mission of providing mobile support to the JFHQ commander and the JOC and, like the JOC, is complete with the latest in computer, technological, and communication advances.

== Organization ==
=== Command of the JTF-NCR ===
The commanding officer of the JTF-NCR is also the Commanding General of the U.S. Army Military District of Washington (MDW). This general officer, who represents the US Army within JTF-NCR through the MDW, is aided by a deputy commanding officer who is not associated with the MDW; he or she is a commanding officer of one of the military component-partners within JTF-NCR, normally the same officer who concurrently serves as the commandant of the Naval District of Washington. The commander of JTF-NCR, like all JTFs in the U.S., must answer to USNORTHCOM and its commanding general.

Commanding Officers of the JTF-NCR
Commander	Deputy Commander	Dates
Major General Antoinette Gant, USA	Rear Admiral David J. Faehnle, USN	2025–Present
Major General Trevor J. Bredenkamp, USA	Rear Admiral Nancy S. Lacore, USN	2023–2024
Major General Allan M. Pepin, USA	Rear Admiral Michael J. Steffen, USN	2021–2023
Major General Omar J. Jones IV, USA	Rear Admiral Carl A. Lahti, USN	2019–2021
Major General Michael L. Howard, USA	Rear Admiral Charles W. Rock, USN	2017–2019
Major General Bradley A. Becker, USA	Rear Admiral Yancy B. Lindsey, USN	2015–2017
Major General Jeffrey S. Buchanan, USA	Rear Admiral Markham K. Rich, USN	2013–2015
Major General Michael S. Linnington, USA	Rear Admiral Patrick J. Lorge, USN	2011–2013
Major General Karl R. Horst, USA	Rear Admiral Patrick J. Lorge, USN	2009–2011
Major General Richard J. Rowe, Jr., USA	Rear Admiral Earl L. Gay, USN	2007–2009
Major General Guy C. Swan III, USA	Rear Admiral Terence E. McKnight, USN	2005–2007
Major General Galen B. Jackman, USA	Rear Admiral Jan Cody Gaudio, USN	2004–2005

The Command Sergeant Major of the MDW, Command Sgt. Maj. Vern B. Daley Jr., fills the same position within the JTF-NCR. Because of the dual-hatted role of the MDW/JTF-NCR Commander, both commands are headquartered out of the same address at Fort Lesley J. McNair, Washington, D.C.

=== Interagency and community cooperation ===
When called upon for assistance by the civilian sector of the National Capital Region, the JTF-NCR acts as a single cooperative point of contact for a wide range of military units, civilian units, and government agencies throughout the Washington, D.C. area.

==== Military units and assets ====
- U.S. Army Military District of Washington/Joint Force Land Component Commander (JFLCC) (MDW)
  - White House Transportation Agency
  - 1st Battalion, 3rd U.S. Infantry Regiment
  - United States Army Band
  - 911th Engineer Company
  - 12th Aviation Battalion
  - Washington Military Police Battalion (CID), Fort Myer, Virginia
    - 68th Military Police Detachment (CID), Fort Meade, Maryland
    - 75th Military Police Detachment (CID), Fort Belvoir, Virginia
  - Site-R Raven Rock Mountain Complex Alternate Joint Communications Center (AJCC) Alternate National Military Command Center
- Naval District Washington (NDW)/Joint Force Maritime Component Commander (JFMCC)
- Air Force District of Washington (AFDW)/Joint Force Air Component Commander (JFACC)
- Marine Corps National Capital Region Command (MCNCRC)
- U.S. Coast Guard Fifth District

On 10 June 2010, Secretary of the Army, John M. McHugh, rescinded MDW's responsibility for the administration and daily operation of Arlington National Cemetery. However, MDW still maintains ceremonial support for funerals and guarding the Tomb of the Unknown Soldier.

When required, the 320th Air Expeditionary Wing activates and becomes the Air Force service component of the task force. Normally, the commander of the Air Force District of Washington serves as the commander of the wing.

==== Military installations ====
- Fort McNair, Washington, D.C.
- Joint Base Myer-Henderson Hall, Virginia
- Fort Belvoir, Virginia
- Fort Walker, Virginia
- Fort Meade, Maryland
- Joint Base Andrews, Maryland

==== Government/intelligence agencies ====
- USNORTHCOM
- Department of Homeland Security's Office of National Capitol Region Coordination (ONCRC)
- Federal Bureau of Investigation (FBI)
  - Joint Terrorism Task Force (JTTF)
- Naval Criminal Investigative Service's Multiple Threat Alert Center (MTAC)
- 902nd Military Intelligence Brigade
- Federal Emergency Management Agency (FEMA)
- U.S. Secret Service
- Federal Aviation Administration
- U.S. Department of Health and Human Services
- Joint Task Force Civil Support (JTF-CS)
- White House Military Office
- D.C./Virginia/Maryland State and National Guard Units
- US Army's Installation Management Agency, Northeast Region Office (IMA-NERO)
- Washington Metropolitan Area Transit Authority
- Washington Headquarters Services
- Pentagon Force Protection Agency
- Walter Reed Army Medical Center
- National Naval Medical Center
- Joint Task Force National Capital Region Medical

==== Civilian units ====
- U.S. Park Police
- U.S. Capitol Police
- Metropolitan Police Department of the District of Columbia
- D.C. Homeland Security Emergency Management Agency (HSEMA)
- Local fire departments
- Local police departments
- Search and Rescue (SAR) units
