= Jeffrey S. Buchanan =

U.S. Army major general

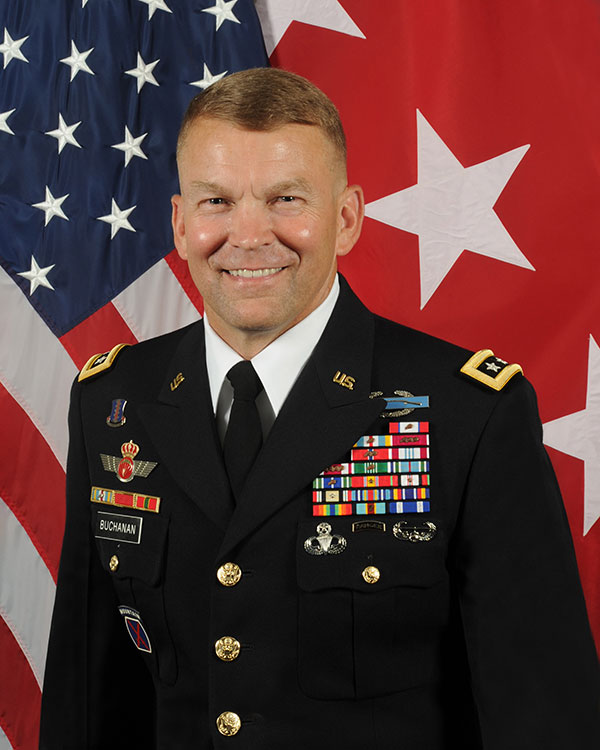
- Military career
- Allegiance: United States of America
- Branch: United States Army
- Service years: 1982–2019
- Rank: Lieutenant General
- Commands: United States Army North (Fifth Army)
- Conflicts: Iraq War; War in Afghanistan

Jeffrey S. Buchanan is a retired lieutenant general of the United States Army. He was the commander of the United States Army North (Fifth Army). He also served as the senior commander of Fort Sam Houston and Camp Bullis.

== Education ==
He has a Bachelor of Science in wildlife ecology from the University of Arizona and a Master of Arts in leadership development from the United States Military Academy.

== Military career ==
He was commissioned a lieutenant in the infantry in May 1982 after graduating from the University of Arizona. He has served four tours in Iraq and one in Afghanistan. He has held command or staff positions in the 82nd Airborne Division, 25th Infantry Division, 101st Airborne Division, and 10th Mountain Division, as well as the U.S. Military Academy and the National Training Center. Recent assignments have included serving as the Deputy Commanding General of I Corps (2012–2013), commander of the US Army Military District of Washington/Joint Force Headquarters-National Capitol Region (2013–2015), and Resolute Support DCOS-Operations/Deputy Commander (Operations) for US Forces-Afghanistan (2015–2016). He was commander of United States Army North from August 26, 2016. until his retirement on July 9, 2019, when he handed command over to Lieutenant General Laura J. Richardson in a change of command ceremony at Joint Base San Antonio-Fort Sam Houston.

He also led Operation Khanjar ("strike of the sword").

In September 2017 he was dispatched to Puerto Rico, a week after the island was devastated by Hurricane Maria. His assignment was to lead all military hurricane relief efforts there and to see how the military can be more effective in the recovery effort, particularly in dealing with the thousands of containers of supplies that are stuck in port because of "red tape, lack of drivers, and a crippling power outage".

== Personal life ==
Buchanan and his wife, Laura have three children and 3 grandchildren

== Dates of rank ==
Rank	Date
Second lieutenant	May 17, 1982
First lieutenant	November 26, 1983
Captain	February 1, 1986
Major	September 2, 1993
Lieutenant colonel	May 1, 1998
Colonel	March 1, 2004
Brigadier general	October 2, 2008
Major general	August 3, 2011
Lieutenant general	August 18, 2016

== Awards and decorations ==
Over the course of his military career, LTG Buchanan has been awarded the following:

Medals and badges
Badge	Combat Infantryman Badge		
1st row	Distinguished Service Medal with 1 Oak leaf cluster (2 awards)		Defense Superior Service Medal with 1 Oak leaf cluster (2 awards)
2nd row	Legion of Merit with 3 Oak leaf clusters (4 awards)	Bronze Star with 2 Oak leaf clusters (3 awards)	Defense Meritorious Service Medal
3rd row	Meritorious Service Medal with 4 Oak leaf clusters (5 awards)	Army Commendation Medal with 1 Oak leaf cluster (2 awards)	Joint Service Achievement Medal
4th row	Army Achievement Medal with 1 Oak leaf cluster (2 awards)	National Defense Service Medal with 1 Service star	Afghanistan Campaign Medal with 1 Campaign star
5th row	Iraq Campaign Medal with 1 Campaign star	Global War on Terrorism Expeditionary Medal	Global War on Terrorism Service Medal
6th row	Army Service Ribbon	Army Overseas Service Ribbon with Award numeral 6	NATO Medal for service with ISAF
Badges	Master Parachutist Badge	Ranger Tab	Air Assault Badge

Other accoutrements
Expert Infantryman Badge
Spanish Parachutist Badge
187th Infantry Regiment Distinctive unit insignia
10th Mountain Division Combat service identification badge
