= List of United States Army lieutenant generals since 2020 =

Flag of an Army lieutenant general

The rank of lieutenant general (or three-star general) is the second-highest rank normally achievable in the United States Army, and the first to have a specific number of authorized positions for it set by statute. It ranks above major general (two-star general) and below general (four-star general).

There have been 101 lieutenant generals in the U.S. Army since 1 January 2020, eight of whom were promoted to four-star general. All 94 achieved that rank while on active duty in the U.S. Army. Lieutenant generals entered the Army via several paths: 55 were commissioned via Reserve Officers' Training Corps (ROTC) at a civilian university, 29 via the U.S. Military Academy (USMA), nine via ROTC at a senior military college, five via Officer Candidate School (OCS), one via ROTC at a military junior college, one via cross-commission at the USAFA and one via direct commission (direct).

== List of generals ==
Entries in the following list of lieutenant generals are indexed by the numerical order in which each officer was promoted to that rank while on active duty, or by an asterisk (*) if the officer did not serve in that rank while on active duty in the U.S. Army or was promoted to four-star rank while on active duty in the U.S. Army. Each entry lists the general's name, date of rank, (Note: Dates of rank are taken, where available, from the U.S. Army register of active and retired commissioned officers, the General Officer Management Office, or the National Guard Senior Leader Management Office. The date listed is that of the officer's first promotion to lieutenant general. If such a date cannot be found, the next date substituted should be that of the officer's assumption of his/her first three-star appointment. Failing which, the officer's first Senate confirmation date to lieutenant general should be substituted. For officers promoted to lieutenant general on the same date, they should be organized first by date of promotion to four-star rank, and then by the tier of their first listed assignment upon promotion to lieutenant general.) active-duty positions held while serving at three-star rank, (Note: Positions listed are those held by the officer when promoted to lieutenant general. Dates listed are for the officer's full tenure, which may predate promotion to three-star rank or postdate retirement from active duty. Positions held in an acting capacity are italicized.) number of years of active-duty service at three-star rank (Yrs), (Note: The number of years of active-duty service at three-star rank is approximated by subtracting the year in the "Date of rank" column from the last year in the "Position" column. Time spent between active-duty three-star assignments is not counted.) year commissioned and source of commission, (Note: Sources of commission are listed in parentheses after the year of commission and include: the United States Military Academy (USMA); Reserve Officer Training Corps (ROTC) at a civilian university; ROTC at a senior military college such as the Virginia Military Institute (VMI), Norwich University (Norwich), Pennsylvania Military College (PMC), University of North Georgia (UNG), Widener University (Widener), or The Citadel (Citadel); Officer Candidate School (OCS); the aviation cadet program (cadet); the Army National Guard (ARNG); direct commission (direct); and battlefield commission (battlefield).) number of years in commission when promoted to three-star rank (YC), (Note: The number of years in commission before being promoted to three-star rank is approximated by subtracting the year in the "Commission" column from the year in the "Date of rank" column.) and other biographical notes. (Note: Notes include years of birth and death; awards of the Medal of Honor, Congressional Gold Medal, Presidential Medal of Freedom, or honors of similar significance; major government appointments; university presidencies or equivalents; familial relationships with significant military officers or government officials such as U.S. Presidents, cabinet secretaries, U.S. Senators, or state governors; and unusual career events such as premature relief or death in office. Officers who served as enlisted soldiers for 7 years or more prior to commissioning are also noted.)

List of U.S. Army lieutenant generals since 2020
#	Name	Photo	Date of rank	Position	Yrs	Commission	YC	Notes
1	Douglas M. Gabram		22 Jan 2020	Commanding General, U.S. Army Installation Management Command (CG IMCOM), 2020–2022.	2	1984 (ROTC)	36	
*	Randy A. George		4 Feb 2020	Commanding General, I Corps, 2020–2021.; Senior Military Assistant to the Secretary of Defense (SMA SecDef), 2021–2022.	2	1988 (USMA)	32	(1964– ) (Note: Served as Vice Chief of Staff, U.S. Army (VCSA).) (Note: Served as Chief of Staff, U.S. Army (CSA).) Promoted to general, 5 Aug 2022.
2	Robert L. Marion		2 May 2020	Principal Military Deputy to the Assistant Secretary of the Army for Acquisition, Logistics and Technology/Director, U.S. Army Acquisition Corps (PMD(ASA(ALT))/DIRAAC), 2020–2024.	4	1988 (ROTC)	32	
3	David G. Bassett		4 Jun 2020	Director, Defense Contract Management Agency (DIRDCMA), 2020–2023.	3	1988 (ROTC)	32	
4	Flem B. Walker Jr.		2 Jul 2020	Deputy Commanding General/Chief of Staff, U.S. Army Materiel Command (DCG/COFS AMC), 2020–2021.; Deputy Commanding General, U.S. Army Materiel Command (DCG AMC), 2021–2022.	2	1987 (ROTC)	33	
5	Thomas H. Todd III		13 Jul 2020	Deputy Commanding General, Acquisition and Systems Management, U.S. Army Futures Command/Director, Combat Systems Directorate (DCG-ASM/DIRCSD), 2020–2022.; Deputy Commanding General, Acquisition and Systems/Chief Information Officer, U.S. Army Futures Command/Director (DCG-A&S/CIO), 2022–2023.	3	1989 (Citadel)	31	
6	Michael L. Howard		21 Jul 2020	Deputy Commander, U.S. European Command (DCDRUSEUCOM), 2020–2022.	2	1986 (ROTC)	34	
7	Jody J. Daniels		28 Jul 2020	Chief, U.S. Army Reserve/Commanding General, U.S. Army Reserve Command (CAR/CG USARC), 2020–2024.	4	1983 (ROTC)	37	(c. 1962– ) First woman to lead the U.S. Army Reserve.
*	Gary M. Brito		2 Aug 2020	Deputy Chief of Staff, Personnel, Army Staff (DCS G-1), 2020–2022.	2	1987 (ROTC)	33	(1964– ) Promoted to general, 8 Sep 2022.
8	Jon A. Jensen		3 Aug 2020 (Note: Jensen's effective date of rank is 3 August 2020, which is seven days before he assumed the office of director of the Army National Guard.)	Director, Army National Guard (DIRARNG), 2020–2024.; Vice Chief, National Guard Bureau (VCNGB), 2024.	4	1989 (OCS)	31	(1963– )
9	Roger L. Cloutier Jr.		4 Aug 2020	Commander, Allied Land Command (CDRLANDCOM), 2020–2022.	2	1988 (ROTC)	32	(1965– )
10	John B. Morrison Jr.		4 Aug 2020	Deputy Chief of Staff, Command, Control, Communications, Cyber Operations and Networks, Army Staff (DCS G-6), 2020–2024.	4	1986 (ROTC)	34	
11	John S. Kolasheski		4 Aug 2020	Commanding General, V Corps, 2020–2024.	4	1989 (ROTC)	31	
12	Paul T. Calvert		9 Sep 2020	Commander, Combined Joint Task Force – Operation Inherent Resolve (CDRCJTF-OIR), 2020–2021.; Deputy Commanding General/Chief of Staff, U.S. Army Forces Command (DCG/COFS FORSCOM), 2021–2022.; Deputy Commanding General, U.S. Army Forces Command (DCG FORSCOM), 2022–2024.	4	1987 (NGC) (Note: Graduated from North Georgia College & State University, which merged with Gainesville State College in 2013 and is now the University of North Georgia.)	33	
13	Scott A. Spellmon		10 Sep 2020	U.S. Army Chief of Engineers/Commanding General, U.S. Army Corps of Engineers (CoE/CG USACE), 2020–2024.	4	1986 (USMA)	34	(1963– )
14	Laura A. Potter		14 Sep 2020	Deputy Chief of Staff, Intelligence, Army Staff (DCS G-2), 2020–2024.; Director, Army Staff (DAS), 2024–2025.	5	1989 (ROTC)	31	(c. 1971– )
*	James J. Mingus		1 Oct 2020	Director, Operations, Joint Staff, J3, 2020–2022.; Director, Joint Staff (DJS), 2022–2024.	4	1985 (ROTC)	35	(1964– ) Promoted to general, 3 Jan 2024.
15	Willard M. Burleson III		2 Oct 2020	Commanding General, Eighth U.S. Army/Chief of Staff, ROK/U.S. Combined Forces Command (CG EUSA/COFS CFC), 2020–2024.	4	1988 (USMA)	32	(1965– )
16	D. Scott McKean		2 Nov 2020	Deputy Commanding General, Futures and Concepts, U.S. Army Futures Command/Director, Futures and Concepts Center (DCG-FC/DIRFCC), 2020–2024.	4	1990 (USMA)	30	(1968– )
17	A. C. Roper Jr.		4 May 2021	Deputy Commander, U.S. Northern Command/Vice Commander, U.S. Element, North American Aerospace Defense Command (DCDRUSNORTHCOM/VCDRNORAD), 2021–2024.	3	1983 (ROTC)	38	(1963– ) First African-American in the U.S. Army Reserve to achieve the rank of lieutenant general.
18	Maria R. Gervais		28 May 2021	Deputy Commanding General/Chief of Staff, U.S. Army Training and Doctrine Command (DCG/COFS TRADOC), 2021–2024.	3	1987 (ROTC)	34	
19	Erik C. Peterson		2 Jun 2021	Deputy Chief of Staff, Programs, Army Staff (DCS G-8), 2021–2024.	3	1986 (ROTC)	35	
20	Antonio A. Aguto Jr.		8 Jul 2021	Commanding General, First Army, 2021–2022.; Commander, Security Assistance Group – Ukraine (CDRSAG-U), 2022–2024.	3	1988 (USMA)	33	(1966– )
21	Stuart W. Risch		12 Jul 2021	Judge Advocate General, U.S. Army (TJAG), 2021–2024.	3	1984 (ROTC)	37	
22	Paul A. Chamberlain		2 Aug 2021	Military Deputy for Budget to the Assistant Secretary of the Army (Financial Management and Comptroller) (MILDEP ASA(FM&C)), 2021–2025.	4	1988 (ROTC)	33	
*	Ronald P. Clark		4 Aug 2021	Commanding General, U.S. Army Central/Commanding General, Coalition Forces Land Component Command (CG USARCENT/CG CFLCC), 2021–2022.; Senior Military Assistant to the Secretary of Defense (SMA SecDef), 2022–2024.	3	1988 (USMA)	33	(1966– ) Promoted to general, 8 Nov 2024.
23	Jonathan P. Braga		13 Aug 2021	Commanding General, U.S. Army Special Operations Command (CG USASOC), 2021–2025.; Commander, Joint Special Operations Command/Commander, Joint Special Operations Command Forward, U.S. Special Operations Command (CDRJSOC/CDRJSOC-F), 2025-present.	4	1991 (USMA)	30	(1969– )
24	Donna W. Martin		2 Sep 2021	Inspector General, U.S. Army (IG), 2021–2025.	4	1988 (ROTC)	33	(c. 1966– ) Provost Marshal General, U.S. Army, 2020–2021. First woman to be Inspector General of the United States Army.
25	John R. Evans Jr.		9 Sep 2021	Commanding General, U.S. Army North (CG ARNORTH), 2021–2024.	3	1988 (ROTC)	33	(1966– )
*	Xavier T. Brunson		1 Oct 2021	Commanding General, I Corps, 2021–2024.	3	1990 (ROTC)	31	(c. 1965– ) (Note: Served as Commander, U.S. Forces Korea (COMUSFK).) Promoted to general, 20 Dec 2024.
26	Antonio M. Fletcher		15 Oct 2021	Commander, NATO Special Operations Headquarters (CDRNSHQ), 2021–2023.; Commander, Allied Special Operations Forces Command (CDRSOFCOM), 2023–2024.	3	1989 (USMA)	32	
27	Michael R. Fenzel		2 Nov 2021	U.S. Security Coordinator for Israel and the Palestinian National Authority (USSC), 2021–present.	4	1989 (ROTC)	32	(1967– )
*	Christopher T. Donahue		11 Mar 2022	Commanding General, XVIII Airborne Corps, 2022–2024.	2	1992 (USMA)	30	(1969– ) Promoted to general, 10 Dec 2024.
*	Charles R. Hamilton		6 Apr 2022	Deputy Chief of Staff, Logistics, Army Staff (DCS G-4), 2022–2023.	1	1988 (OCS)	34	(1967– ) Promoted to general, 16 Mar 2023.
28	Maria B. Barrett		3 May 2022	Commanding General, U.S. Army Cyber Command/Commander, Joint Force Headquarters – Cyber (Army) (CG ARCYBER/CDRJFHQ-C), 2022–2025.	3	1988 (ROTC)	34	
29	Douglas A. Sims II		10 Jun 2022	Director, Operations, Joint Staff, J3, 2022–2024.; Director, Joint Staff (DJS), 2024–2025.	3	1991 (USMA)	31	(1968– )
30	Steven W. Gilland		27 Jun 2022	Superintendent, U.S. Military Academy, 2022–present.	3	1990 (USMA)	32	(1968– )
31	John P. Sullivan		30 Jun 2022	Deputy Commander, U.S. Transportation Command (DCDRUSTRANSCOM), 2022–2024.	2	1987 (ROTC)	35	
32	Omar J. Jones IV		5 Jul 2022	Commanding General, U.S. Army Installation Management Command (CG IMCOM), 2022–2025.	3	1992 (USMA)	30	
33	Patrick D. Frank		7 Jul 2022	Commanding General, U.S. Army Central/Commanding General, Coalition Forces Land Component Command (CG USARCENT/CG CFLCC), 2022–2026.; Deputy Commander, U.S. Central Command (DCDRUSCENTCOM), 2026-present.	3	1989 (ROTC)	33	(1967– )
34	James B. Jarrard		28 Jul 2022	Deputy Commanding General, U.S. Army Pacific (DCG USARPAC), 2022–2024.	2	1988 (NGC)	34	(1966– )
35	Andrew M. Rohling		2 Aug 2022	Deputy Commanding General, U.S. Army Europe and Africa (DCG USAREUR-AF), 2022–2024.; Deputy Chair, NATO Military Committee (DCMC), 2024–2025.	3	1989 (ROTC)	33	
36	Douglas F. Stitt		5 Aug 2022	Deputy Chief of Staff, Personnel, Army Staff (DCS G-1), 2022–2024.	2	1990 (Norwich)	32	
37	Robert A. Rasch Jr.		2 Sep 2022	Director, Rapid Capabilities and Critical Technologies Office (DIRRCCTO), 2022–2025.	3	1989 (ROTC)	33	
38	Kevin Vereen		21 Sep 2022	Deputy Chief of Staff, Installations, Army Staff (DCS G-9), 2022–2024.	2	1988 (ROTC)	34	(c. 1970– ) Provost Marshal General, U.S. Army, 2019–2020.
39	Patrick E. Matlock		3 Oct 2022	Deputy Chief of Staff, Operations, Plans and Training, Army Staff (DCS G-3/5/7), 2022–2024.	2	1988 (USMA)	34	(1965– ) Son-in-law of Army four-star general Tommy Franks.
40	Milford H. Beagle Jr.		4 Oct 2022	Commanding General, U.S. Army Combined Arms Center/Commandant, U.S. Army Command and General Staff College/Executive Vice Chancellor, Army University/Deputy Commanding General, Combined Arms, U.S. Army Training and Doctrine Command (CG USACAC/CMDT CGSC/EVC ArmyU/DCG-CA TRADOC), 2022–2025.	3	1990 (ROTC)	32	
41	Richard R. Coffman		4 Oct 2022	Deputy Commanding General, U.S. Army Futures Command (DCG AFC), 2022–2024.	2	1989 (ROTC)	33	
42	Sean C. Bernabe		4 Oct 2022	Commanding General, III Armored Corps, 2022–2024.; Deputy Commanding General, U.S. Army Europe and Africa (DCG USAREUR-AF), 2024–present.	3	1992 (USMA)	30	(1970– )
43	Christopher O. Mohan		30 Nov 2022	Deputy Commanding General, U.S. Army Materiel Command (DCG AMC), 2022–2025.; Commanding General, U.S. Army Materiel Command (CG AMC), 2024–present.	3	1989 (ROTC)	33	
44	Telita Crosland		3 Jan 2023	Director, Defense Health Agency (DIRDHA), 2023–2025.	2	1993 (USMA)	30	
45	Thomas L. James		5 Dec 2023	Deputy Commander, U.S. Space Command (USSPACECOM), 2023–2025.	2	1990 (ROTC) (Note: Enlisted in 1983, commissioned as aviation officer in 1990.)	33	(c. 1968– ) Served seven years in the enlisted ranks before receiving his commission in 1990.
46	Heidi J. Hoyle		5 Dec 2023	Deputy Chief of Staff, Logistics, Army Staff (DCS G-4), 2023–2025.	2	1994 (USMA)	29	
47	David T. Isaacson		15 Dec 2023	Director, Command, Control, Communications and Computers/Cyber and Chief Information Officer, Joint Staff, J6, 2023–present.	2	1988 (ROTC)	35	
48	Anthony R. Hale		3 Jan 2024	Deputy Chief of Staff, Intelligence, Army Staff (DCS G-2), 2024–2025.	1	1990 (ROTC)	33	
49	Robert M. Collins		3 Jan 2024	Principal Military Deputy to the Assistant Secretary of the Army for Acquisition, Logistics and Technology/Director, U.S. Army Acquisition Corps (PMD(ASA(ALT))/DIRAAC), 2024–present.	1	1992 (ROTC)	32	
50	Michele H. Bredenkamp		4 Jan 2024	Director's Advisor for Military Affairs, Office of the Director of National Intelligence (ADV-ODNI), 2024–2025.; Director, National Geospatial-Intelligence Agency (DIRNGA), 2025-present.	1	1990 (ROTC)	34	
51	David M. Hodne		9 Jan 2024	Deputy Commanding General, Futures and Concepts, U.S. Army Futures Command/Director, Futures and Concepts Center (DCG-FC/DIRFCC), 2024–2025.	1	1991 (USMA)	33	(1969– ) Promoted to general, 2 Oct 2025.
52	Sean A. Gainey		9 Jan 2024	Commanding General, U.S. Army Space and Missile Defense Command/U.S. Army Forces Strategic Command/Commander, Joint Functional Component Command for Integrated Missile Defense (CG USASMDC/ARSTRAT/CDRJFCC IMD), 2024–present.	1	1990 (ROTC)	34	
53	William J. Hartman		16 Jan 2024	Deputy Commander, U.S. Cyber Command (DCDRUSCYBERCOM), 2024–present.; Commander, U.S. Cyber Command/Director, National Security Agency/Chief, Central Security Service (CDRUSCYBERCOM/DIRNSA/CCSS), 2025–present.	1	1989 (ROTC)	35	
54	Mary K. Izaguirre		25 Jan 2024	Surgeon General, U.S. Army/Commanding General, U.S. Army Medical Command (TSG/CG MEDCOM), 2024–present.	1	1991 (direct) (Note: Directly commissioned via the Armed Forces Health Professions Scholarship Program (HPSP).)	33	
55	Mark T. Simerly		2 Feb 2024	Director, Defense Logistics Agency (DIRDLA), 2024–present.	1	1984 (ROTC)	30	
56	Karl H. Gingrich		2 Feb 2024	Deputy Chief of Staff, Programs, Army Staff (DCS G-8), 2024–2025.	1	1990 (ROTC)	34	
57	Stephen G. Smith		2 Apr 2024	Deputy Commanding General, U.S. Army Forces Command (DCG FORSCOM), 2024–present.	1	1991 (Citadel)	33	
58	John W. Brennan Jr.		3 Apr 2024	Deputy Commander, U.S. Africa Command (DCDRUSAFRICOM), 2024–present.	1	1990 (ROTC)	34	
59	Christopher C. LaNeve		5 Apr 2024	Commanding General, Eighth U.S. Army/Chief of Staff, ROK/U.S. Combined Forces Command (CG EUSA/COFS CFC), 2024–2025.; Senior Military Assistant to the Secretary of Defense (SMA SecDef), 2025–2026.	1	1990 (ROTC)	34	Promoted to general, 6 Feb 2026.
60	Charles D. Costanza		8 Apr 2024	Commanding General, V Corps, 2024–present.	1	1991 (USMA)	33	(1969– )
61	Joseph P. McGee		2 May 2024	Director, Strategy, Plans and Policy, Joint Staff, J5/Senior Member, U.S. Delegation to the U.N. Military Staff Committee (Sr. Member MSC), 2024–2025.	1	1990 (USMA)	34	(c. 1967– )
62	Thomas M. Carden Jr.		4 May 2024	Deputy Commander, U.S. Northern Command/Vice Commander, U.S. Element, North American Aerospace Defense Command (DCDRUSNORTHCOM/VCDRNORAD), 2024–2026.	1	1989 (OCS)	35	(c. 1968– ) Promoted to general, 16 Jan 2026.
63	Jered P. Helwig		10 Jul 2024	Deputy Commander, U.S. Transportation Command (DCDRUSTRANSCOM), 2024–present.	1	1994 (ROTC)	30	
64	Joseph B. Berger III		10 Jul 2024	Judge Advocate General, U.S. Army (TJAG), 2024–2025.	1	1992 (USMA)	32	(c. 1970– ) Relieved, 2025.
65	Robert D. Harter		1 Aug 2024	Chief, U.S. Army Reserve/Commanding General, U.S. Army Reserve Command (CAR/CG USARC), 2024–present.	1	1988 (Virginia Tech)	36	(c. 1970– )
66	David J. Francis		1 Aug 2024	Deputy Commanding General, U.S. Army Training and Doctrine Command/Commanding General, U.S. Army Army Center for Initial Military Training (DCG TRADOC/CG USACIMT), 2024–present.	1	1989 (ROTC)	35	(c. 1967– )
67	Brian S. Eifler		2 Aug 2024	Deputy Chief of Staff, Personnel, Army Staff (DCS G-1), 2024–present.	1	1990 (ROTC)	34	(1968– )
68	Jonathan M. Stubbs		3 Aug 2024	Director, Army National Guard (DIRARNG), 2024–present.; Chief, National Guard Bureau (CNGB), 2024.; Vice Chief, National Guard Bureau (VCNGB), 2024.	1	1995 (OCS) (Note: Enlisted in 1993, commissioned as infantry officer in 1995.)	29	(1972– )
69	Curtis A. Buzzard		5 Aug 2024	Commander, Security Assistance Group – Ukraine (CDRSAG-U), 2024.; Commander, Security Assistance Group – Ukraine/Commander, NATO Security Assistance and Training for Ukraine (CDRSAG-U/CDRNSATU), 2024–present.	1	1992 (USMA)	32	
70	Mark H. Landes		5 Aug 2024 (Note: Jensen's effective date of rank is 5 Aug 2024; which is approximately one month before he officially assumed command of First Army.)	Commanding General, First Army, 2024–present.	1	1990 (USMA)	34	(1968– )
71	Kevin D. Admiral		7 Aug 2024	Commanding General, III Armored Corps, 2024–present.	1	1994 (ROTC)	30	
72	David Wilson		3 Sep 2024	Deputy Chief of Staff, Installations, Army Staff (DCS G-9), 2024–present.	1	1991 (Citadel)	33	
73	William H. Graham Jr.		13 Sep 2024	U.S. Army Chief of Engineers/Commanding General, U.S. Army Corps of Engineers (CoE/CG USACE), 2024–present.	1	1989 (ROTC)	35	(c. 1967– )
74	Joshua M. Rudd		25 Sep 2024	Deputy Commander, U.S. Indo-Pacific Command (DCDRUSINDOPACOM), 2024–present.	1	1993 (ROTC)	31	(c. 1971– )
75	Joel B. Vowell		2 Oct 2024	Deputy Commanding General, U.S. Army Pacific (DCG USARPAC), 2024–present.	1	1991 (ROTC)	33	
76	Paul T. Stanton		4 Oct 2024	Director, Defense Information Systems Agency/Commander, Joint Force Headquarters – Department of Defense Information Network (DIRDISA/CDRJFHQ-DoDIN), 2024–2025.; Director, Defense Information Systems Agency/Commander, Department of Defense Cyber Defense Command (DIRDISA/CDRDCDC), 2025–present.	1	1995 (USMA)	29	(c. 1973– )
77	Richard E. Angle		4 Oct 2024	Commander, Allied Special Operations Forces Command/Commander, Special Operations Command Europe (CDRSOFCOM/CDRSOCEUR), 2024–present.	1	1991 (USMA)	33	
78	Matthew W. McFarlane		25 Oct 2024	Commanding General, I Corps, 2024–present.	1	1992 (ROTC)	32	
79	Edmond M. Brown		2 Nov 2024	Deputy Commanding General, U.S. Army Futures Command (DCG AFC), 2024–present.	1	1994 (Citadel)	30	
80	Joseph A. Ryan		4 Nov 2024	Deputy Chief of Staff, Operations, Plans and Training, Army Staff (DCS G-3/5/7), 2024–2025.	1	1991 (USMA)	33	(c. 1970– ) Promoted to general, 5 Dec 2025.
81	Allan M. Pepin		3 Dec 2024	Commanding General, U.S. Army North (CG ARNORTH), 2024–present.	1	1988 (ROTC)	36	(c. 1966– )
82	Gregory K. Anderson		6 Dec 2024	Commanding General, XVIII Airborne Corps, 2024–present.	1	1991 (USMA)	33	
83	Johnny K. Davis		20 Dec 2024	Commanding General, U.S. Army Recruiting Command (CG USAREC), 2024–present.	1	1989 (NMMI)	35	
84	Jeth B. Rey		3 Jan 2025	Deputy Chief of Staff, Command, Control, Communications, Cyber Operations and Networks, Army Staff (DCS G-6), 2025–present.	0	1996 (OCS)	29	Served 13 years in the enlisted ranks before receiving his commission in 1996.
85	Gregory J. Brady		17 Mar 2025	Inspector General, U.S. Army (IG), 2025–present.	0	1991 (USMA)	34	(1969– )
86	Mark S. Bennett		3 Aug 2025	Military Deputy for Budget to the Assistant Secretary of the Army (Financial Management and Comptroller) (MILDEP ASA(FM&C)), 2025–present.	0	1990 (ROTC)	35	
87	Marcus S. Evans		2 Sep 2025	Director, Army Staff (DAS), 2025–present.	0	1994 (ROTC)	31	(c.1970- )
88	James M. Smith		24 Sep 2025	Commanding General, U.S. Army Installation Management Command (CG IMCOM), 2025-present.	0	1992 (ROTC)	33	(c.1970- )
89	Joseph E. Hilbert		10 Oct 2025	Commanding General, Eighth U.S. Army/Chief of Staff, ROK/U.S. Combined Forces Command (CG EUSA/COFS CFC), 2025–present.	0	1993 (ROTC)	32	
90	Winston P. Brooks Jr.		13 Oct 2025	Deputy Chair, NATO Military Committee (DCMC), 2025–present.	0	1993 (ROTC)	32	
91	James P. Isenhower III		30 Oct 2025	Commanding General, U.S. Army Combined Arms Center/Commandant, U.S. Army Command and General Staff College/Executive Vice Chancellor, Army University (CG USACAC/CMDT CGSC/EVC ArmyU), 2025–present.	0	1992 (USMA)	33	
92	Richard L. Zellmann		3 Nov 2025	Deputy Commander, U.S. Space Command (USSPACECOM), 2025–present.	0	1992 (USMA)	33	
93	Francisco J. Lozano		3 Nov 2025	Director, Rapid Capabilities and Critical Technologies Office (DIRRCCTO), 2025–present.	0	1993 (ROTC)	32	
94	Lawrence G. Ferguson		3 Nov 2025	Commanding General, U.S. Army Special Operations Command (CG USASOC), 2025–present.	0	1990 (USAFA)	35	
95	William D. Taylor		12 Nov 2025	U.S. Military Representative, NATO Military Committee (USMILREP), 2025–present.	0	1990 (ROTC)	35	
96	Michelle K. Donahue		14 Nov 2025	Deputy Chief of Staff, Logistics, Army Staff (DCS G-4), 2025–present.	0	1992 (ROTC)	33	
97	Gavin A. Lawrence		20 Nov 2025	Deputy Commanding General, U.S. Army Materiel Command (DCG AMC), 2025–present.	0	1995 (USMA)	32	
98	Christopher L. Eubank		3 Dec 2025	Commanding General, U.S. Army Cyber Command/Commander, Joint Force Headquarters – Cyber (Army) (CG ARCYBER/CDRJFHQ-C), 2025–present.	0	1991 (VMI)	32	
99	Michelle A. Schmidt		5 Dec 2025	Deputy Chief of Staff, Intelligence, Army Staff (DCS G-2), 2025–present.	0	1992 (USMA)	33	
100	Brett G. Sylvia		18 Dec 2025	Director, Strategy, Plans and Policy, Joint Staff, J5/Senior Member, U.S. Delegation to the U.N. Military Staff Committee (Sr. Member MSC), 2025–present.	0	1994 (USMA)	31	
101	Peter N. Benchoff		05 Jan 2026	Deputy Chief of Staff, Programs, Army Staff (DCS G-8), 2026–present.	0	1993 (USMA)	33	
102	Joseph Jarrard		26 Jan 2026	Deputy Commander, U.S. Northern Command/Vice Commander, U.S. Element, North American Aerospace Defense Command (DCDRUSNORTHCOM/VCDRNORAD), 2026–present.	0	1988 (NGC)	38	(1966– ) Twin brother of Army three-star general James Jarrard.
103	Brian W. Gibson		6 Feb 2026	Deputy Direct Reporting Program Manager for Golden Dome for America (GDA DRPM), 2026–present.	0	1992 (ROTC)	34	(1970– )
104	Kevin C. Leahy		6 Feb 2026	Commanding General, U.S. Army Central/Commanding General, Coalition Forces Land Component Command (CG USARCENT/CG CFLCC), 2026-present.	0	1993 (ROTC)	33	

== Background ==
=== Modern use of the rank ===
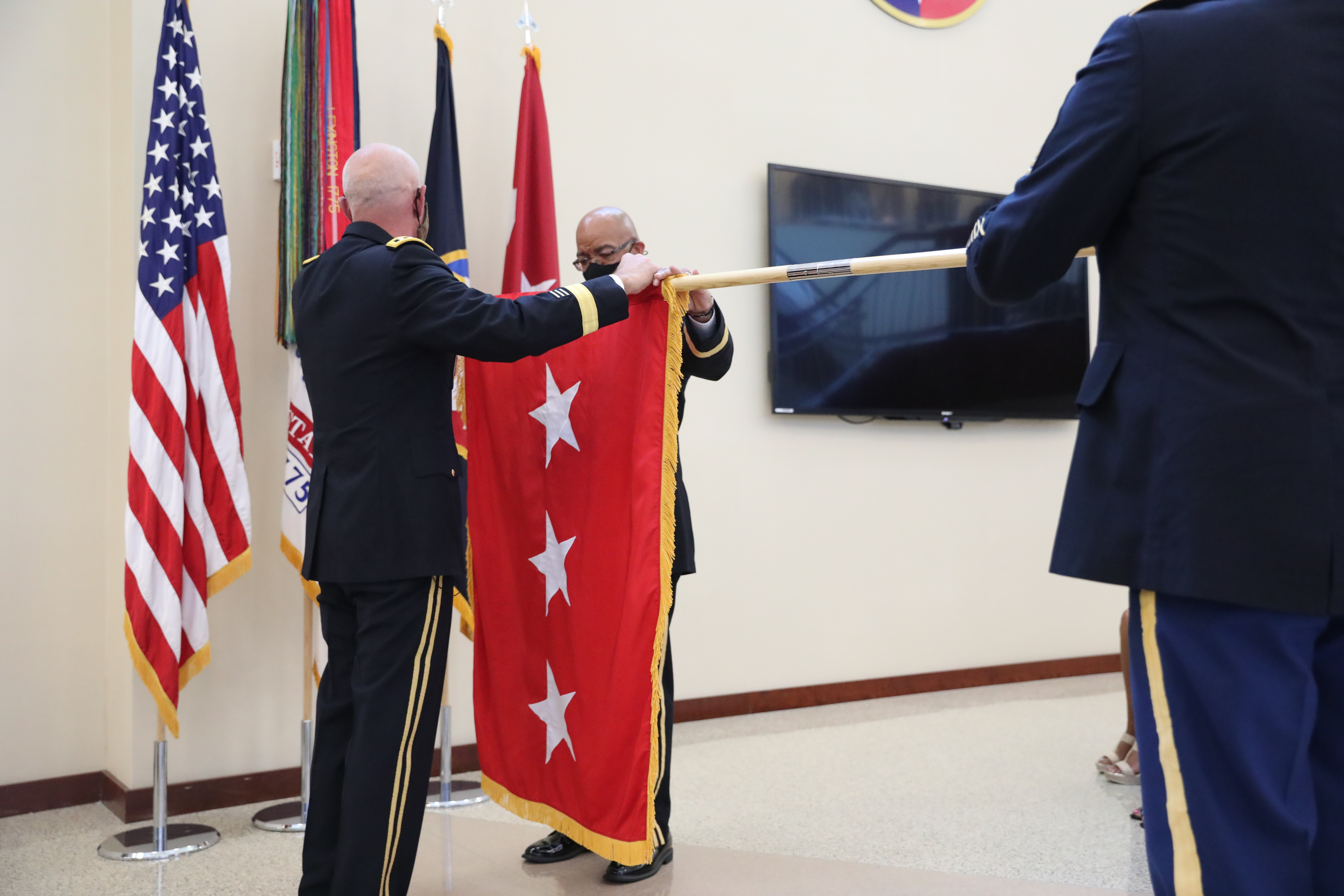
Lt. Gen. A.C. Roper and Lt. Gen. (ret.) Charles D. Luckey unveil Roper's three-star flag on 14 May 2021.

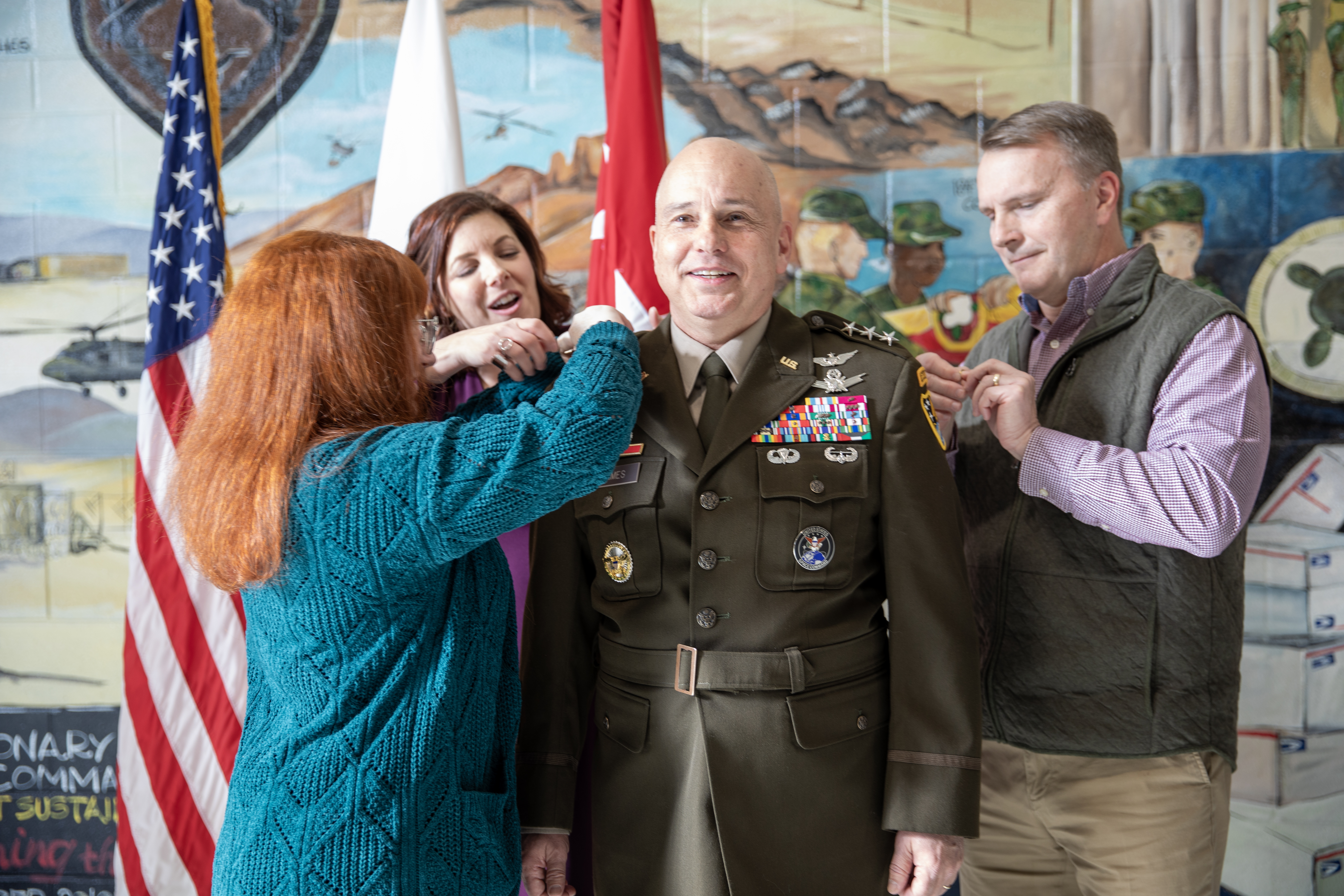
Lt. Gen. Thomas L. James is pinned with his lieutenant general's stars by his family on 15 December 2023.

Aside from the conventional role of lieutenant generals as corps or field army commanders, said billets also include senior staff positions under the authority of the four-star chief and vice chief of staff (such as the director of the Army staff), high-level specialty positions (Note: For officers in specialty career paths such as the Medical Corps, or Army Reserve, these positions are the highest they can attain. There have been exceptions, such as when Maryanne Miller was promoted to general in 2018, becoming the first Air Force Reserve officer to reach four-star rank.) like the chief of engineers, surgeon general and chief of Army Reserve, deputy commanders of four-star Army commands and the commanders of the Army service component commands. (Note: with the exception of U.S. Army Europe and Africa (a four-star billet) and U.S. Army South (a two-star [one-star promotable] billet)) The superintendent of the United States Military Academy has also been a lieutenant general without interruption since 1981, as has been the director of the Army National Guard since 2001.

About 30 to 50 joint service three-star billets exist at any given time that can be occupied by an Army lieutenant general, among the most prestigious being the director of the Joint Staff (DJS), principal staff advisor to the chairman of the Joint Chiefs of Staff and historically considered a stepping stone to four-star rank. All deputy commanders of the unified combatant commands are of three-star rank, (Note: The deputy commander of U.S. European Command was a four-star position until 2007, when it was reduced in rank to make way for the establishment of U.S. Africa Command, commanded by a four-star officer. The last four-star deputy commander of USEUCOM, General William E. Ward, also became the first commander of USAFRICOM.) as are directors of Defense Agencies not headed by a civilian such as the director of the Defense Intelligence Agency (DIRDIA). Internationally-based three-star positions include the United States military representative to the NATO Military Committee (USMILREP) and the security coordinator for Israel and the Palestinian National Authority. All nominees for three-star rank must be confirmed via majority by the Senate before the appointee can take office and thus assume the rank.

==== Statutory limits, elevations and reductions ====
The U.S. Code states that no more than 46 officers in the U.S. Army may hold the rank of lieutenant general on the active duty list, aside from those on joint duty assignments. Three-star positions can be elevated to four-star grade or reduced to two-star grade when necessary, either to highlight their increasing importance (Note: 10 U.S.C. § 601 refers to positions held by four-star and three-star officers as "positions of importance and responsibility".) to the defense apparatus (or lack thereof) or to achieve parity with equivalent commands in other services or regions. Few three-star positions are set by statute, leading to their increased volatility as they do not require congressional approval to be downgraded.

==== Senate confirmations ====
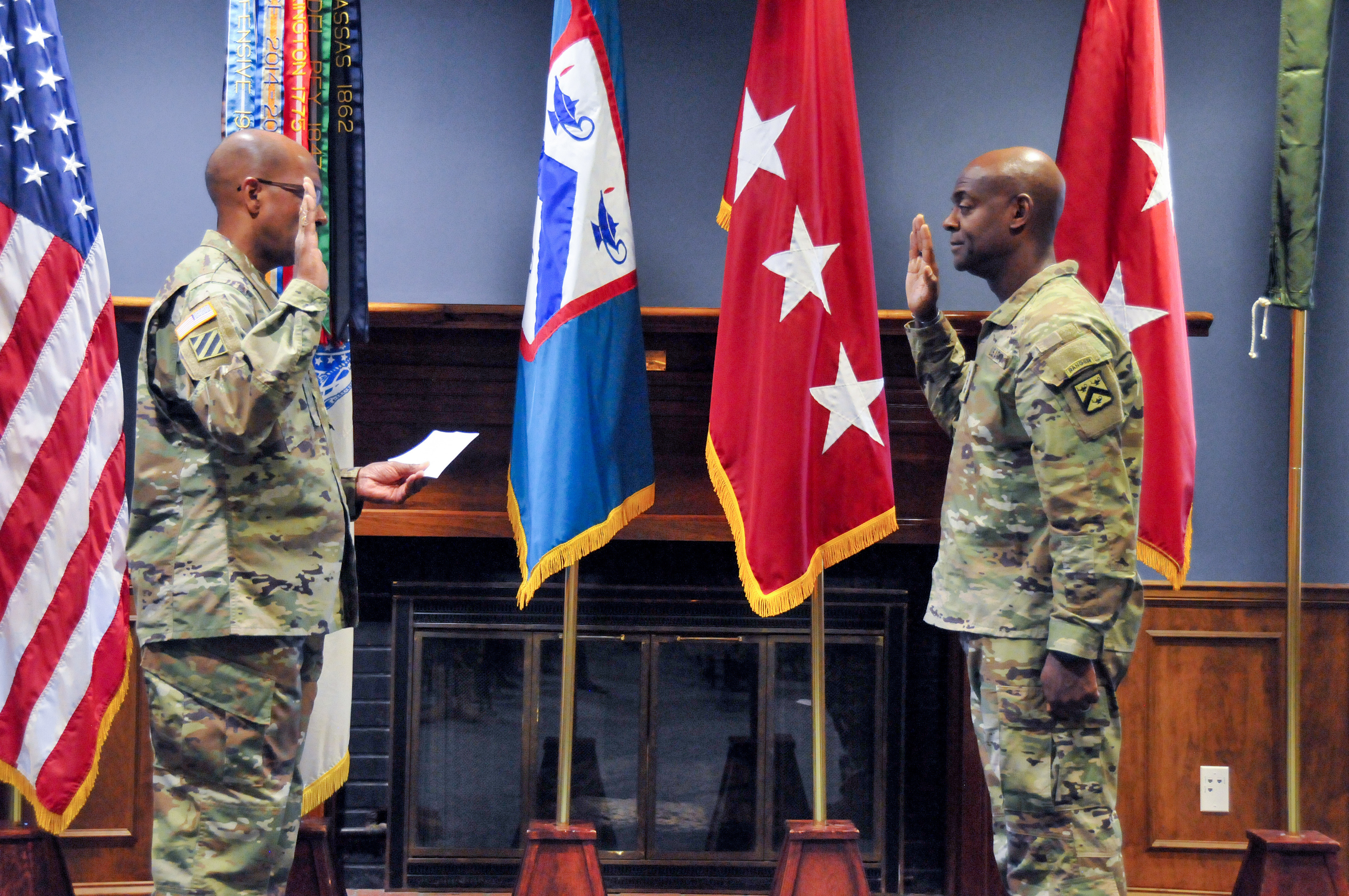
Lt. Gen. Milford H. Beagle Jr. (right) is sworn into his new rank by TRADOC commanding general Gen. Gary M. Brito (left) on 4 October 2022.

Military nominations are considered by the Senate Armed Services Committee. While it is rare for three-star or four-star nominations to face even token opposition in the Senate, nominations that do face opposition due to controversy surrounding the nominee in question are typically withdrawn. Nominations that are not withdrawn are allowed to expire without action at the end of the legislative session.

- For example, the nomination of Ryan F. Gonsalves for promotion to lieutenant general and assignment as commanding general of U.S. Army Europe was withdrawn in November 2017 after an investigation was launched into the general's inappropriate comment to a female Congressional staffer. As a result, Gonsalves was administratively reprimanded and retired in May 2018.

Additionally, events that take place after Senate confirmation may still delay or even prevent the nominee from assuming office.

- For example, John G. Rossi, who had been confirmed for promotion to lieutenant general and assignment as the commanding general of the U.S. Army Space and Missile Defense Command in April 2016 committed suicide two days before his scheduled promotion and assumption of command. As a result, the then incumbent commander of USASMDC, David L. Mann, remained in command beyond customary term limits until another nominee, James H. Dickinson was confirmed by the Senate.

== See also ==
- Lieutenant general (United States)
- General officers in the United States
- List of active duty United States four-star officers
- List of active duty United States three-star officers
- List of United States Army four-star generals
- List of lieutenant generals in the United States Army before 1960
- List of United States Army lieutenant generals from 1990 to 1999
- List of United States Army lieutenant generals from 2000 to 2009
- List of United States Army lieutenant generals from 2010 to 2019
- List of United States military leaders by rank
- Staff (military)
