= Anthony Potts =

U.S. Army general (1963/1964–2023)

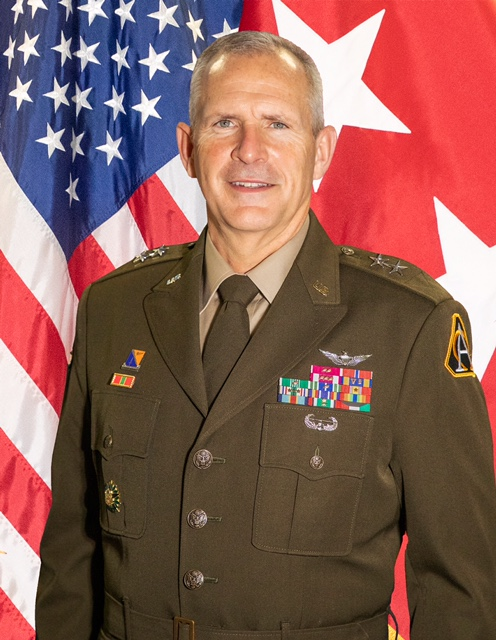
- Official portrait, 2021
- Born: 1963/1964
- Died: July 25, 2023 (aged 59); Havre de Grace, Maryland, U.S.
- Military career
- Allegiance: United States
- Branch: United States Army
- Service years: 1986–2023
- Rank: Major General
- Commands: PEO C3T; PEO Soldier; Natick Soldier Systems Center; PEO Missiles and Space
- Conflicts: Gulf War; Operation Desert Shield; Operation Desert Storm
- Awards: Army Distinguished Service Medal; Legion of Merit (3); Bronze Star Medal

Anthony W. Potts (1963/1964 – July 25, 2023) was a United States Army major general who served as the Program Executive Officer for Command, Control and Communications (Tactical) from June 22, 2022, to June 2023. He most recently served as the Program Executive Officer for Soldier of the United States Army, and before that served as the Deputy Commanding General of the United States Army Research, Development, and Engineering Command and Senior Commander of the Natick Soldier Systems Center.

On July 25, 2023, Potts died in the crash of a Piper PA-28 Cherokee that he was piloting near Havre de Grace, Maryland. He was 59. The crash is under investigation by the U.S. National Transportation Safety Board. His funeral was held on August 29, after which he was interred at Arlington National Cemetery.

Military offices
Preceded by Thomas H. Todd III	Deputy Commanding General of the United States Army Research, Development, and Engineering Command and Senior Commander of the Natick Soldier Systems Center; 2017–2018	Succeeded by Vincent F. Malone II
Preceded by Brian P. Cummings	Program Executive Officer for Soldier of the United States Army; 2018–2022	Succeeded by Christopher D. Schneider
Preceded by Robert M. Collins	Program Executive Officer for Command, Control and Communications (Tactical); 2022–2023	Succeeded by Mark C. Kitz
