= U.S. Army Acquisition Support Center =

Part of the office of the ASA(ALT)

Acquisition Support Center
- Shoulder sleeve insignia
- Active: 2002–present
- Country: United States
- Branch: United States Army
- Size: 4,600 employees (2026)
- Part of: United States Department of the Army
- Garrison/HQ: Fort Belvoir, Virginia

Commanders
- Director: Ronald R. (Rob) Richardson, Jr

Insignia
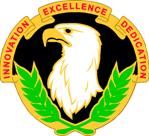
- US Army Acquisition Support Center DUI

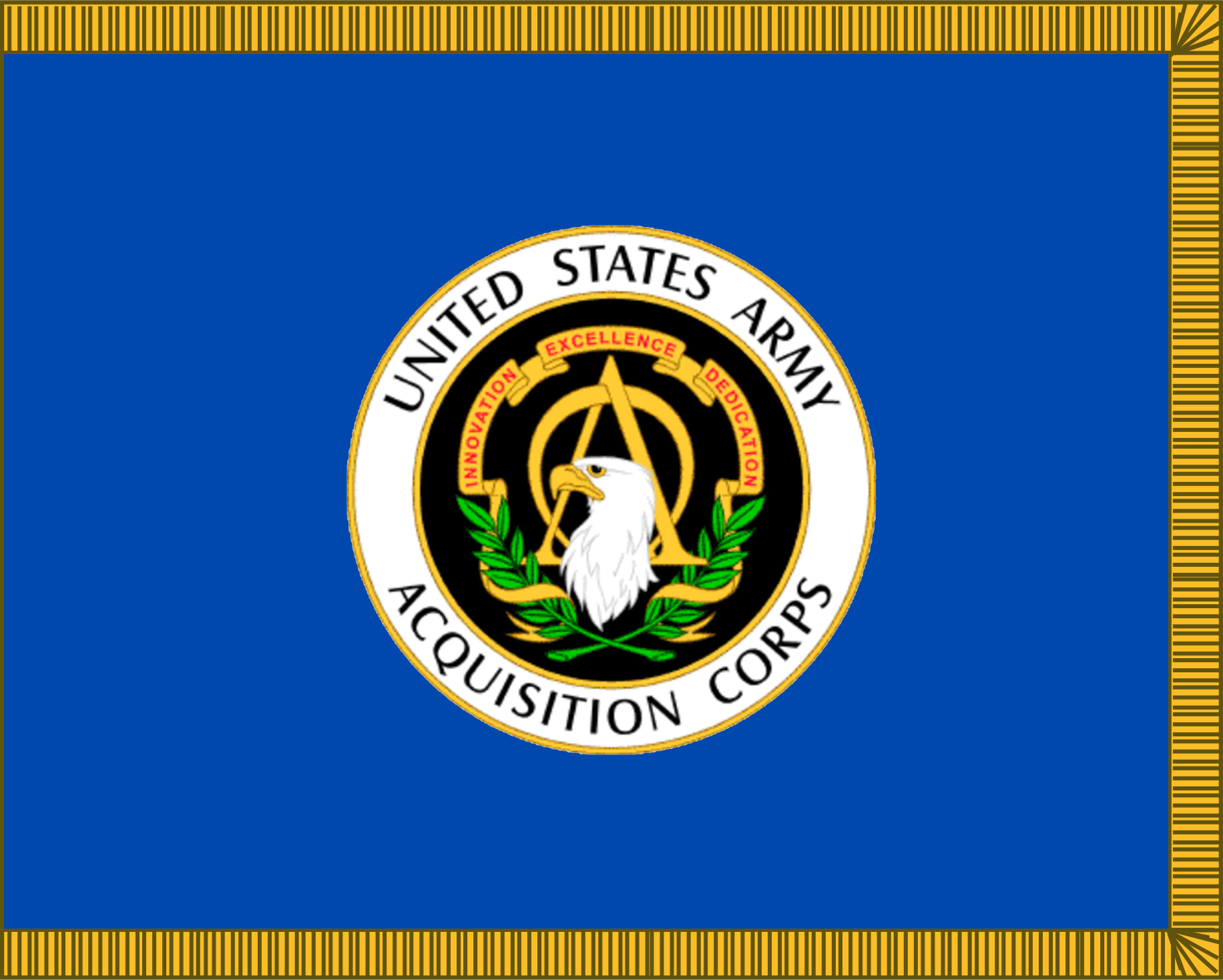
- US Army Acquisition Corps Flag

The United States Army Acquisition Support Center (USAASC) is part of the Office of the Assistant Secretary of the Army for Acquisition, Logistics, and Technology (ASA(ALT)). USAASC is headquartered at Fort Belvoir, Virginia.

== Overview ==
USAASC was established in its current form on October 1, 2002. It was designated as a direct reporting unit (DRU) of the Assistant Secretary of the Army for Acquisition, Logistics, and Technology (ASA(ALT)) on October 16, 2006.

Its core functions include:

- Providing career development support for the Army Acquisition Workforce and the United States Army Acquisition Corps, military and civilian acquisition leaders.
- Providing customer service and support to the Army program executive offices in the areas of human resources, resource management (manpower and budget), program structure, and acquisition information management.
- Advising the ASA(ALT) and others on acquisition issues.

=== Leadership of USAASC ===
Craig Spisak served as the director of the USAASC from 2005 to 2021. Mr. Spisak also serves as the Deputy Director for Acquisition Career Management. Mr. Spisak retired from federal service in July 2021. He was succeeded by Ronald (Rob) Richardson as the ASC Director and Director for Acquisition Career Management (DACM) in August 2021.

== Director, Acquisition Career Management (DACM) ==
The DACM Office is the organization within the USAASC responsible for providing professional development opportunities for the Army Acquisition Workforce and establishing the procedures that train, educate, and develop members of the workforce.

The Army DACM Office works directly with the Defense Acquisition University (DAU), the Assistant Secretary of Defense (Acquisition), and the Under Secretary of Defense (Acquisition, Technology and Logistics) to enable workforce initiatives and to serve as advocates for the Army Acquisition Workforce.

The Defense Acquisition Workforce Improvement Act, aimed to professionalize the defense acquisition workforce. The Army DACM Office supports DAWIA-required training, education and experience for the workforce through three main lines of effort.

=== Leadership of DACM ===
Lt. Gen. Robert L. Marion was confirmed by the Senate to succeed Lt. Gen. Paul A. Ostrowski as the Principal Military Deputy to the Assistant Secretary of the Army for Acquisition, Logistics and Technology (ASA(ALT)) and the Director, Army Acquisition Corps on March 20, 2020.

Mr. Ronald (Rob) Richardson, Director, U.S. Army Acquisition Support Center, serves as the DACM. His staff, the Army DACM Office, enables the mission of the DACM.

== Insignia ==
=== Shoulder sleeve insignia ===
USAASC shoulder sleeve insignia

The U.S. Army Acquisition Support Center shoulder sleeve insignia was first approved for the U.S. Army Acquisition Executive Support Agency (AAESA) in 1998 by the Institute of Heraldry.

The AAESA and Acquisition Career Management Office merged to create USAASC in 2001, and the SSI was re-designated for the USAASC on 1 October 2002.

Wear of the USAASC shoulder sleeve insignia is approved for military personnel on its table of distribution and allowances (TDA), which includes program executive offices (replaced by similar management offices between 2025 and 2026) and certain staff elements. The SSI is not authorized for the Acquisition Corps or other units.

Adapted from the Acquisition Corps' emblem, the Greek letters alpha and omega symbolize the intricate and continuous acquisition process.

== See also ==
- Assistant Secretary of the Army for Acquisition, Logistics, and Technology (ASA(ALT))
- Defense Acquisition University (DAU)
- Under Secretary of Defense (Acquisition and Sustainment)
- Defense Acquisition Workforce Improvement Act
