= General Marion =

General Marion may refer to:

- Charles Stanislas Marion (1758–1812), First French Empire brigadier general
- Charles Marion (politician) (1887–1944), Vichy French general
- Francis Marion (c. 1732–1795), South Carolina Militia brigadier general in the American Revolutionary War
- Robert L. Marion (fl. 1980s–2020s), U.S. Army lieutenant general
