= L. Neil Thurgood =

U.S. Army general

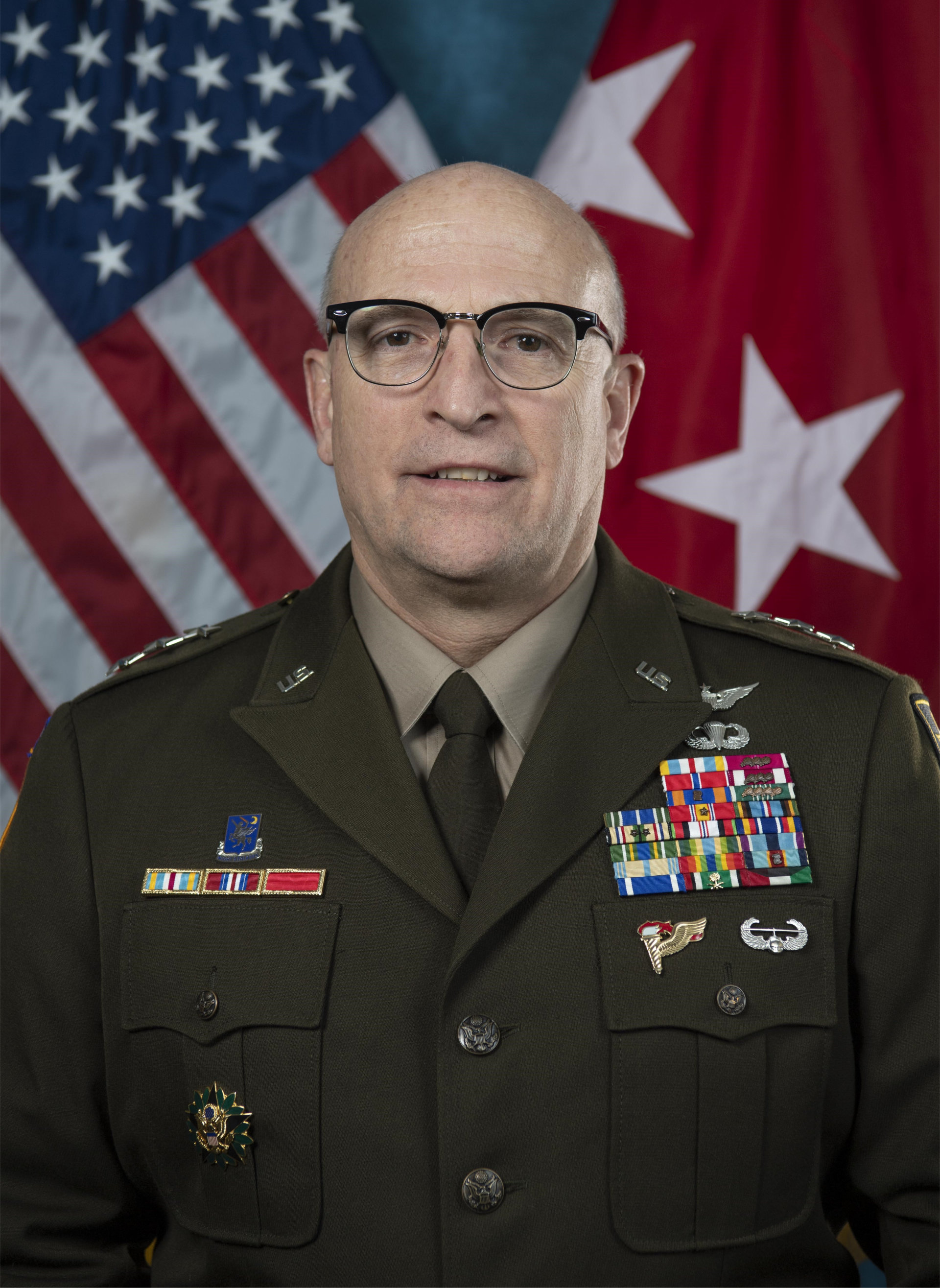
- Official portrait, 2021
- Born: Leon Neil Thurgood
- Military career
- Allegiance: United States
- Branch: United States Army
- Service years: 1983–2022
- Rank: Lieutenant General
- Commands: Rapid Capabilities and Critical Technologies Office
- Conflicts: Gulf War; War in Afghanistan
- Awards: Defense Superior Service Medal; Legion of Merit (4); Bronze Star Medal

Leon Neil Thurgood is a retired United States Army lieutenant general who last served as the director of the Rapid Capabilities and Critical Technologies Office. He previously served as the Special Assistant to the Assistant Secretary of the Army for Acquisition, Logistics, and Technology.

Thurgood is a member of the Church of Jesus Christ of Latter-day Saints. His father, Leon Thurgood, was also an officer in the United States military. Most of the time he was growing up he lived in various countries in Europe. Thurgood began his education at Brigham Young University and served a mission for the Church in the England Birmingham Mission. He then entered the United States military as an enlisted man. He later studied at the University of Utah where he was part of the ROTC. He has a doctorate in strategic planning and organizational behavior from the University of Sarasota.

Thurgood retired from active duty in 2022.

Military offices
Preceded by Ole A. Knudson	Program Executive Officer for Missiles and Space of the United States Army; 2013–2016	Succeeded by Barry J. Pike
Preceded by Paul A. Ostrowski	Deputy for Acquisition and Systems Management of the Office of the Assistant Secretary of the Army for Acquisition, Logistics, and Technology; 2016–2017	Succeeded by Robert L. Marion
Preceded by Paul A. Ostrowski	Deputy Commander of the Combined Security Transition Command-Afghanistan; 2017–2018	Succeeded by Patrick W. Burden
Preceded by Daniel P. Hughes	Director for Test of the Missile Defense Agency; 2018–2019	Succeeded by Douglas M. Gabram
New office	Director of the Rapid Capabilities and Critical Technologies Office; 2019–2022	Succeeded by Robert A. Rasch
