= Robert L. Marion =

U.S. Army general

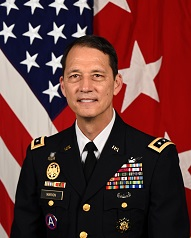
- Military career
- Allegiance: United States
- Branch: United States Army
- Service years: 1988–2024
- Rank: Lieutenant General
- Commands: United States Army Acquisition Corps
- Conflicts: War in Afghanistan
- Awards: Defense Superior Service Medal; Legion of Merit (2)

Robert L. Marion is a retired United States Army lieutenant general who served as the principal military deputy to the Assistant Secretary of the Army for Acquisition, Logistics, and Technology and the Director of the United States Army Acquisition Corps from 2020 to 2024. He previously served as the Deputy Commander of the Combined Security Transition Command-Afghanistan.

Military offices
Preceded by William T. Crosby	Program Executive Officer for Aviation of the United States Army; 2014–2017	Succeeded by Thomas H. Todd III
Preceded by Leon N. Thurgood	Deputy for Acquisition and Systems Management at the Office of the Assistant Secretary of the Army for Acquisition, Logistics, and Technology; 2017–2018	Succeeded by Patrick W. Burden
Preceded by Patrick W. Burden	Deputy Commander of the Combined Security Transition Command-Afghanistan; 2019–2020	Succeeded by William M. Boruff
Preceded by Paul A. Ostrowski	Principal Military Deputy to the Assistant Secretary of the Army for Acquisition, Logistics, and Technology and Director of the United States Army Acquisition Corps; 2020–2024	Succeeded by Robert M. Collins
