= Robert A. Rasch =

U.S. Army general

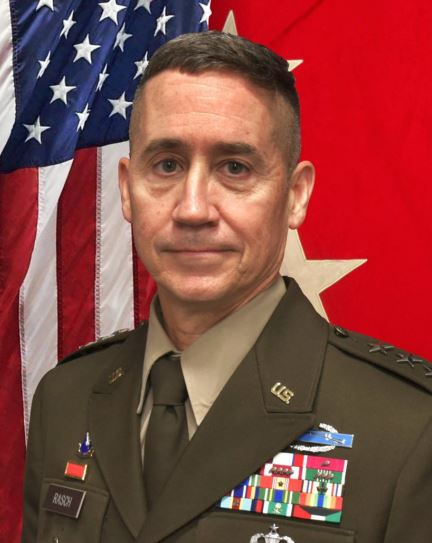
- Official portrait, 2023
- Military career
- Allegiance: United States
- Branch: United States Army
- Service years: 1989–2025
- Rank: Lieutenant General
- Commands: Rapid Capabilities and Critical Technologies Office
- Conflicts: Gulf War
- Awards: Legion of Merit (2)

Robert A. Rasch Jr. is a former United States Army lieutenant general who served as the director of the Rapid Capabilities and Critical Technologies Office from September 2022 to October 2025. He was previously the program executive officer for missiles and space from July 2018 to August 2022.

== Military career ==
In May 2022, Rasch was nominated for promotion to lieutenant general and assignment as director of hypersonics, directed energy, space and rapid acquisition of the Office of the Assistant Secretary of the Army (Acquisition, Logistics and Technology), succeeding L. Neil Thurgood.

Military offices
Preceded by William E. Cole	Deputy Program Executive Officer for Missiles and Space of the United States Army; 2016–2018	Succeeded by Darryl Colvin
Preceded by Barry J. Pike	Program Executive Officer for Missiles and Space of the United States Army; 2018–2022	Succeeded by Frank J. Lozano
Preceded by L. Neil Thurgood	Director of the Rapid Capabilities and Critical Technologies Office; 2022–present	Incumbent
