= Thomas H. Todd III =

United States Army general

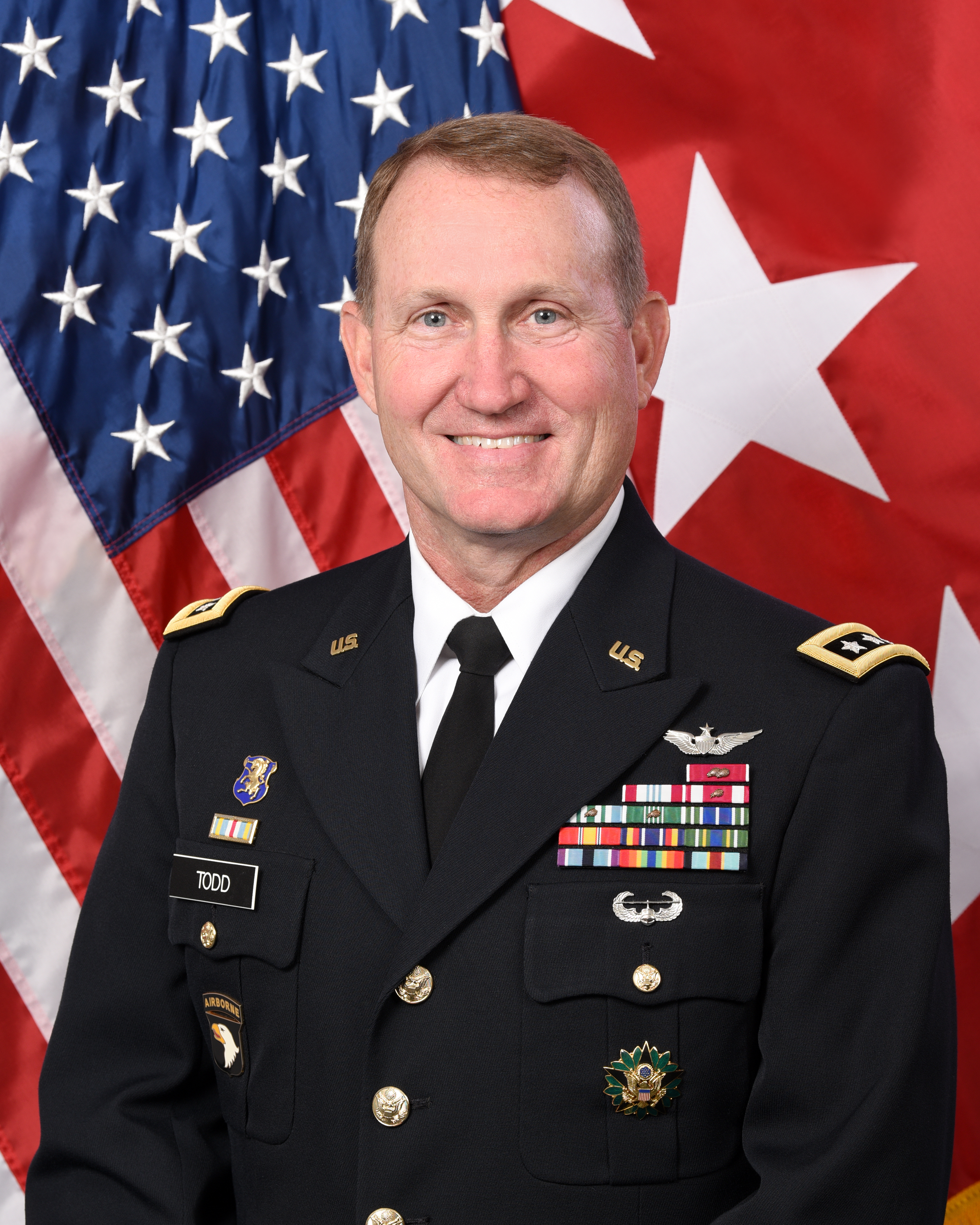
- Alma mater: Air War College (MSS); Florida Institute of Technology (MSCM); The Citadel (BSBA)
- Military career
- Allegiance: United States
- Branch: United States Army
- Service years: 1989–2023
- Rank: Lieutenant General
- Awards: Legion of Merit (3)

Thomas Hiram Todd III is lieutenant general in the United States Army who last served as Deputy Commanding General of Acquisition and Systems at United States Army Futures Command in Texas.

Previously, Todd was Program executive officer of Aviation at Redstone Arsenal in Alabama. He was Deputy Commanding General of United States Army Combat Capabilities Development Command in Maryland, and Senior Commander of Natick Soldier Systems Center in Massachusetts.

In 1989 Todd was commissioned a second lieutenant at The Citadel where he majored in business administration. An army aviator, he deployed on both Operation Enduring Freedom (Afghanistan) and Operation Iraqi Freedom. Todd is a graduate of the OH-58 and H-60 Maintenance Test Pilot Course, the Army Aviation Officer Advanced Course, and the Command and General Staff Officer Course. He has a master's degree in contract management from the Florida Institute of Technology, and a master's in strategic studies from the United States Air Force Air War College.

Military offices
Preceded by William E. Cole	Deputy Commanding General of the United States Army Research, Development, and Engineering Command and Senior Commander of the Natick Soldier Systems Center; 2015–2017	Succeeded by Anthony Potts
Preceded by Robert L. Marion	Program Executive Officer for Aviation of the United States Army; 2017–2020	Succeeded by Robert L. Barrie Jr.
Preceded by Patrick W. Burden	Deputy Commanding General for Acquisition and Systems of the United States Army Futures Command; 2020–2023	Vacant
