= United States Army Acquisition Corps =

U.S. Army branch charged with product development, fielding, and support

Acquisition Corps
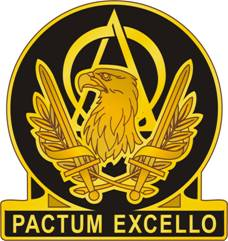
- Regimental insignia
- Active: 1989–present
- Country: United States of America
- Branch: United States Army
- Type: Military acquisition
- Role: Product development, fielding, and support
- Motto: Pactum Excello
- Colors: Black

Commanders
- Principal Military Deputy OASA (ALT): LTG Robert M. Collins

Insignia
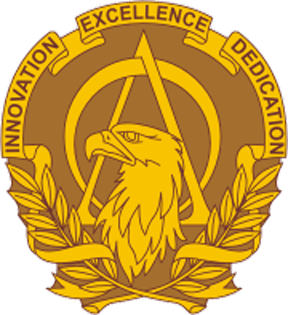
- Branch insignia

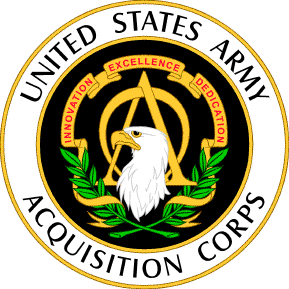
- Branch plaque

The United States Army Acquisition Corps (AAC) is the officer / NCO corps of the United States Army Acquisition Workforce (AAW), a branch which includes civilians, officers, and NCOs. The Acquisition Corps is composed of army officers who serve in acquisition, a specialized form of product development, fielding, and support and Noncommissioned Officers who specialize in Contracting, Level I Program Management and Purchasing. These officers begin their careers in the other branches of the army for eight years, after which they may elect the Acquisition branch as their career as assistant program managers (APMs), program managers (PMs), and program executive officers (PEOs). (A PEO can be civilian.) The Noncommissioned Officers (NCOs) are reclassified in the Army Acquisition NCO Corps after serving 7–10 years in their respective enlisted career management fields, and serve primarily in the Army Acquisition Career Management Field - 51 and (MOS) 51C. 4% percentage of the Army Acquisition Officers serve among the 40,000 members of the army acquisition workforce, 6% in MOS 51C - Acquisition, Logistics and Technology Contracting Noncommissioned Officer (Active, Reserve and National Guards), and the remainder 90% percentage consist largely of Department of the Army civilians.

The director of the Army Acquisition Corps, currently a lieutenant general, also serves as principal military deputy (PMILDEP) to the Assistant Secretary of the Army for Acquisition, Logistics, and Technology or ASA(ALT). The PMILDEP is also director of combat systems for Army Futures Command (AFC), by Army Directive 2018-15. The Office of ASA(ALT) has a direct reporting unit (DRU) which is denoted the U.S. Army Acquisition Support Center (USAASC). An office within USAASC, DACM ensures the professional development of the Acquisition Workforce as well as the Officers / NCOs corps itself, including the recruitment of suitable Captains, Majors, Staff Sergeants and Sergeant First Class into the pipeline of courses at the US Army Acquisition Corps School of Acquisition Excellence, Huntsville, AL and Defense Acquisition University (DAU). DAU certifies the 150,000-member Defense Acquisition Workforce, including the Army's Acquisition workforce of 40,000 civilians, officers, and NCOs (MOS 51C).

Army Acquisition Workforce	40,000		Army role
Army Acquisition Workforce	%	count	Army role
USAASC	12	4800	acquisition support
Army Corps of Engineers	18	7200	combat service support
Army Materiel Command	60	24000	materiel provider
ATEC	4	1600	test and evaluation
Other	3	1200	low density acquisition
MEDCOM	2	800	combat medical equipment
SMDC	1	400	space and missile defense

== History ==
The Acquisition Corps was instituted in 1989 by Chief of Staff Carl Vuono. Vuono's goal was to professionalize the Acquisition workforce. In 2006 the Army Acquisition NCO Corps was approved by the Department of the Army and instituted by the Office of the Assistant Secretary of the Army (Acquisition, Logistics, and Technology)/Army Acquisition Executive by the Honorable Claude M. Bolton Jr.

During the post-9/11 period, the US Army was preoccupied with counter-insurgencies, leaving its competitors free to develop new weapon systems. In order to address this need for modernization, the Army Futures Command (AFC) was instituted in 2018. AFC's approach to modernization is to clarify the engineering of a candidate system before it becomes a Program of Record in the Acquisition process. "Our new approach is really to prototype as much as we can to help us identify requirements, so our reach doesn't exceed our grasp. ... A good example is Future Vertical Lift: The prototyping has been exceptional." —Secretary of the Army Mark Esper

The Army Requirements Oversight Council (AROC) is an advisory council to the Army Chief of Staff, who chairs AROC. AROC is a mechanism which can authorize the acquisition process. AROC brings the budgeting, requirements and acquisition circles into a venue for making some key decisions. (Note: Both DCS G-8 and G-3/5/7 sit on the Army Requirements Operating Council (AROC), chaired by the Chief of Staff of the Army (CSA).)

== Acquisition process ==
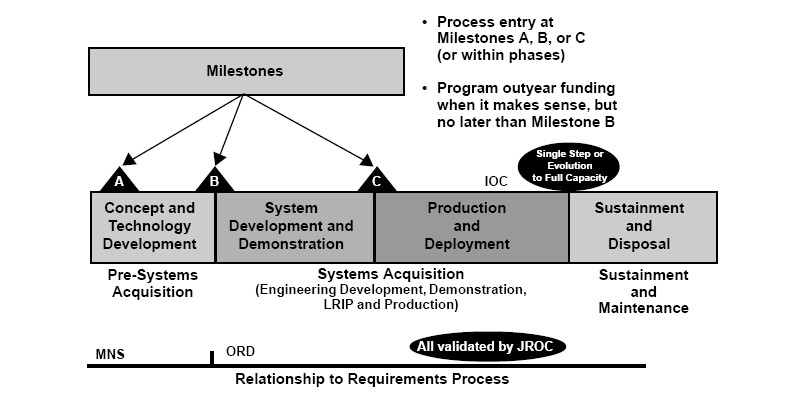
DoD (2007) Acquisition process denoting Milestones A, B, C along a timeline. When a milestone has been met, the triangle then points downward, at this time. Otherwise the milestone is planned, but not yet met at this time.

Before a prototype can become a Program of Record, the Army has determined that prototype has a desired capability. For a Program of Record, the Acquisition Life Cycle is

°Materiel Solution Analysis;
°Technology Maturation & Risk Reduction;
°Engineering & Manufacturing Development;
°Production & Deployment;
°Operations & Support

The 40,000 member Acquisition workforce (AAW) is composed as follows (Source: CAPPMIS As of 31 July 2018):

Percentage, Acquisition Career Field
1% Business-Cost Estimating
4% Information Technology
4% Business-Financial Management
17% Life-cycle Logistics
20% Contracting
4% Production, Quality and Manufacturing
23% Engineering
8% Program Management
12% Facilities Engineering
1% Purchasing
<1% Industrial/Contract Property Management
1% Science & Technology Manager
5% Test and Evaluation

The Acquisition process has existed for centuries, but has historically been beset by dysfunctional response to change. The US Army has not fielded a new weapon system in decades. The Acquisition process is in need of reform, as noted by Senator John McCain to General Mark Milley, during Milley's confirmation hearings as Army Chief of Staff. A series of Acquisition reforms has attempted to address these problems, not the least of which is an impending funding shortfall in 2020. Secretary Esper scrubbed through 800 modernization programs to reprioritize funding for the top 6 modernization priorities, which will consume 80% of the modernization funding of the army, of 18 systems. The Budget Control Act will restrict funds by 2020. One issue is that Acquisition leadership gets unreadable reports, according to the GAO.

A succession of Army Secretaries and Army Chiefs of Staff have instituted reforms, or else project cancellations, in response.

The 2018 approach is to prototype and experiment (before Milestone B, for Army Acquisition) before the Materiel Development Decision.

== Modernization priorities ==
The Army's modernization priorities of 2018, and its Cross-functional teams (CFTs), are found in the Army Futures Command (AFC):

1. Long Range Precision Fires (Artillery branch)
2. Next Generation Combat Vehicles (Armor branch)
3. Future Vertical Lift (Aviation branch)
4. Expeditionary network (Signal Corps)
5. Air and Missile defense (Air Defense Artillery branch)
6. Soldier Lethality completes the top six CFTs; in addition,
7. Assured Positioning, Navigation and Timing seeks a wartime replacement for GPS, and
8. Synthetic Training Environment provides virtual reality training for Soldiers at their home stations

The last two CFTs are cross-cutting over multiple domains.

From the viewpoint of Futures Command, a quick failure is preferable to a long, drawn-out failure. The 6th ASA(ALT) Bruce Jette has cautioned the acquisition community to 'call-out' unrealistic processes which commit a program to a drawn-out failure, rather than failing early, and seeking another solution. A cancellation with harvestable content is not a total loss. In the Department of Defense, the materiel supply process was underwritten by the acquisition, logistics, and technology directorate of the Office of the Secretary of Defense (OSD), with a deputy secretary of defense (DSD) to oversee five areas, one of them being acquisition, logistics, and technology (ALT). ALT is overseen by an under secretary of defense (USD). But as of 2018 the DoD under secretary (USD) for ALT is participating in a reorganization of the DoD Acquisition process. (See: Joint Capabilities Integration and Development System (JCIDS), and Analysis of Alternatives) Dr. Jette points out that the army, by using middle-tier acquisition, has been exempted from the DoD 5000 and JCIDS procedures and is allowed to use rapid prototyping.

== Modernization process ==
The modernization of the combat systems of the US Army in a timely way is the goal of Futures Command, established in 2018. AFC uses Cross-functional teams (CFTs) to downselect prospective requirements from the myriad solutions that might possibly feed into the Acquisition process. Each CFT addresses one of a manageable number of priorities set by the secretary and Chief of Staff of the Army. A CFT is a team of teams, at base a small co-located team of experts, each expert reaching back to their respective team when necessary, for additional knowledge on requirements, acquisition, science and technology, test, resourcing, costing, and sustainment. Each CFT experiments on, and tests, prototypes to learn what is doable in a timely way. Each prototype is expected to reach Milestones: A, B, C, .. until a Materiel Development Decision (MDD) can be made, whether or not to admit a Combat system into the Acquisition process. Otherwise a prototype is discarded or divested from the modernization portfolio.

The current acquisition system has pieces all throughout the Army. ... There’s chunks of it in TRADOC and chunks of it in AMC and then other pieces. So really all we’re trying to do is get them all lined up under a single command…..from concept, S&T, RDT&E, through the requirements process, through the beginnings of the acquisition system — Milestone A, B, and C — ….aligned under that same commander. ... We will finally achieve… unity of command — Secretary Esper.

The ASA(ALT) is the Acquisition executive (AAE). By statute, an MDD is ultimately the decision of the Acquisition executive (because the AAE, with the concurrence of the Chief of Staff of the Army, has Milestone Decision Authority —MDA), who jointly might delegate the details of that materiel development decision to the PMILDEP or PEO. The PMILDEP has found CFTs to be so useful that he has recommended that each PEO find a CFT as soon as possible (in 2018). (Note: AROC context)

The principal military deputy (PMILDEP) of ASA(ALT) was to be also director of combat systems for Army Futures Command (AFC), by Army Directive 2018-15 but AD2018-15 has been rescinded by AD2022-07; AD2022-07 also rescinds AD2020-15.
