= Sean Bernabe =

US Army general

Sean C. Bernabe
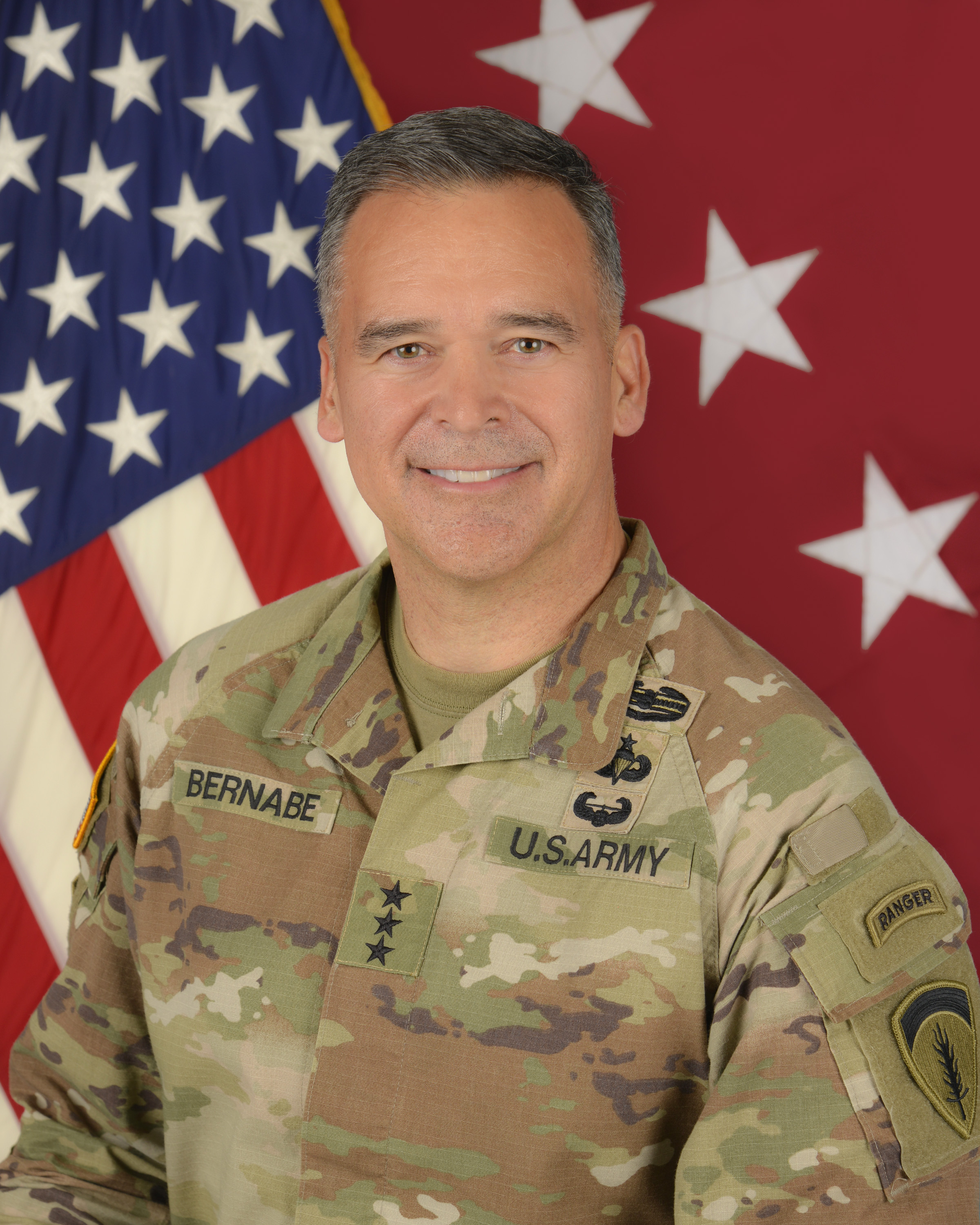
- Born: 1970 (age 55–56)
- Education: United States Military Academy (BS); School of Advanced Military Studies (MMAS); National War College (MNSS)
- Children: 1
- Relatives: divorced
- Military career
- Allegiance: United States
- Branch: United States Army
- Service years: 1992–present
- Rank: Lieutenant General
- Commands: III Armored Corps; 1st Armored Division; Task Force Marne, 3rd Infantry Division; Operations Group, Joint Readiness Training Center; 2nd Brigade Combat Team, 1st Cavalry Division; 2nd Battalion, 14th Infantry Regiment
- Conflicts: Iraq War; War in Afghanistan
- Awards: Legion of Merit (3); Bronze Star Medal (3)

Sean Cardona Bernabe (born 1970) is a United States Army lieutenant general who has served as the deputy commanding general of United States Army Europe and Africa since August 2024. He most recently served as the commanding general of III Armored Corps from 2022 to 2024. He previously served as the commanding general of the 1st Armored Division from 2020 to 2022.

== Education and military career ==
Bernabe is a 1992 graduate of the United States Military Academy with a Bachelor of Science degree in electrical engineering. He holds a master's degree in military art and science from the School of Advanced Military Studies at the Army Command and General Staff College and a master's degree in national security strategy from the National War College.

Bernabe served as Deputy Commanding General, United States Army Europe from July to September 2020.

In May 2024, Bernabe was nominated for assignment as deputy commanding general of United States Army Europe and Africa.

Military offices
| Preceded by Timothy J. Daugherty | Deputy Chief of Staff for Operations, Plans, and Training of United States Army Europe; 2018–2020 | Succeeded by John V. Meyer III |
| Preceded by Timothy P. McGuire | Deputy Commanding General of United States Army Europe; 2020 | Succeeded by Joseph Jarrard; Acting |
| Preceded by Matthew Eichburg; Acting | Commanding General of the 1st Armored Division; 2020–2022 | Succeeded by James P. Isenhower III |
| Preceded by Robert P. White | Commanding General of the III Armored Corps; 2022–2024 | Succeeded by Kevin Admiral |
| Preceded by Andrew Rohling | Deputy Commanding General of United States Army Europe and Africa; 2024–present | Incumbent |
