= Andrew Rohling =

U.S. Army general

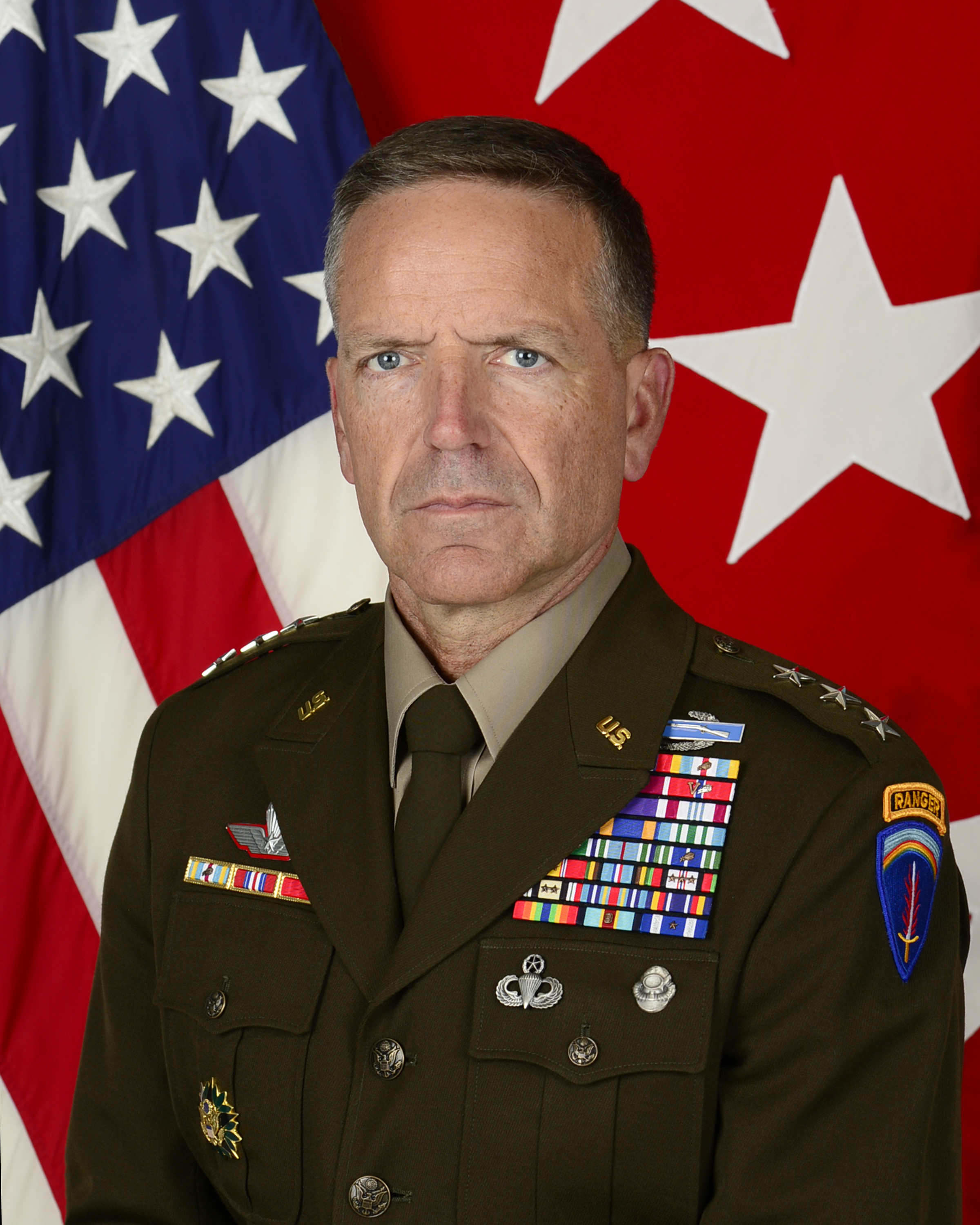
- Official portrait, 2022
- Military career
- Allegiance: United States
- Branch: United States Army
- Service years: 1989–2025
- Rank: Lieutenant General
- Commands: Deputy Chair of the NATO Military Committee; U.S. Army Southern European Task Force, Africa; United States Army Africa; 173rd Airborne Brigade; 3rd Battalion, 187th Infantry Regiment
- Awards: Distinguished Service Medal; Defense Superior Service Medal (2); Legion of Merit (3); Bronze Star Medal (2); Purple Heart

Andrew M. Rohling is a retired United States Army lieutenant general who serves as the deputy chair of the NATO Military Committee from 2024 to 2025. He previously served as the deputy commanding general of the United States Army Europe and Africa from 2022 to 2024. He also served as the commanding general of the Southern European Task Force-Africa and deputy commanding general for Africa of the United States Army Europe and Africa.

In May 2023, Rohling was nominated for reappointment as lieutenant general and assigned as deputy chair of the NATO Military Committee. In February 2024, he assumed the position.

Military offices
Preceded by Carl A. Alex	Deputy Commanding General (Support) of the 10th Mountain Division; 2015–2017	Succeeded by Milford Beagle Jr.
Preceded by Joseph P. Harrington	Deputy Chief of Staff for Operations of the Allied Rapid Reaction Corps; 2017–2018	Succeeded by David M. Hamilton
Preceded by Timothy McGuire	Deputy Commanding General of United States Army Europe; 2018–2020	Succeeded by Sean Bernabe
Preceded by Roger Cloutier	Commanding General of United States Army Africa; 2020	Unit merged
Preceded by Roger Cloutier	Commanding General of U.S. Army Southern European Task Force, Africa; 2020–2022	Succeeded by Todd R. Wasmund
New office	Deputy Commanding General for Africa of United States Army Europe and Africa; 2020–2022	Succeeded by Todd R. Wasmund
Preceded by Peter Andrysiak	Deputy Commanding General of United States Army Europe and Africa; 2022–2024	Succeeded by Sean Bernabe
Preceded by Lance Landrum	Deputy Chair of the NATO Military Committee; 2024–2025	Succeeded by Winston P. Brooks Jr.
