= PEO Soldier =

Acquisition program executive office of the United States Army

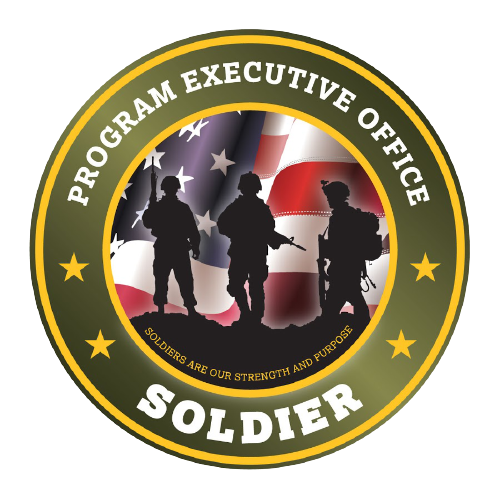
- PEO Soldier emblem
- Active: 2002–present
- Country: United States
- Branch: U.S. Army
- Type: Program executive office
- Role: Developing equipment and weapons for US soldiers
- Size: 1,438 employees (2019 figures)
- Garrison/HQ: Fort Belvoir, Virginia
- Website: peosoldier.army.mil

Commanders
- Program executive officer: BG Troy M. Denomy
- Deputy program executive officer: Mr. Andrew T. Clements
- Sergeant major: SGM Jonathon D. Dyon

Insignia
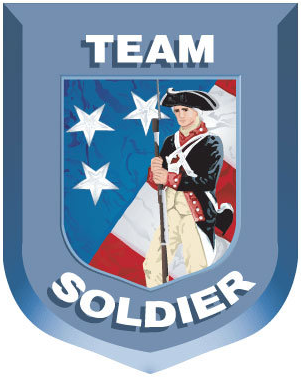
- PEO Soldier logo (2002)

The Program Executive Office Soldier (PEO Soldier), sometimes PEO-Soldier or Team Soldier is a program executive office of the United States Army responsible for rapid prototyping, procurement, and fielding of soldier's equipment.

== History ==
=== PM Soldier ===
In June 1992, the Project Manager for Soldier Systems (PM-Soldier Systems) — shortened as PM Soldier / PM-Soldier / PM, Soldier — was officially chartered. The "Systems" in PM Soldier Systems was frequently omitted, likely for better compatibility with TSM Soldier, or TRADOC Systems Manager Soldier. The TSM Soldier — later renamed as TCM Soldier (TRADOC Capability Manager Soldier) — was TRADOC's counterpart to PM Soldier.

PM Soldier's purpose was to centralize the life-cycle management of soldier system-related materiel acquisition. Its role was to manage the cost, schedule, and performance factors associated with the development, acquisition, and fielding of materiel for the soldier. In June 1993, Colonel William T. Meadows was assigned as the Project Manager-Soldier.

On 29 September 1994, Project Manager, Soldier was assigned to Headquarters, U.S. Army Materiel Command (AMC). The mission of PM Soldier was to modernize the soldier as a total system. All elements of a soldier system must work together to achieve a balance among the soldier's fighting capabilities (lethality, mobility, communications and control, survivability, and sustainability). This applies to the development and acquisition of items the individual soldier wears, consumes or carries in a tactical environment. The soldier system also includes non-tactical clothing and individual equipment, and dress clothing. PM Soldier also provided centralized project management of the Soldier System program within AMC.

PM Soldier was responsible for the coordination of concept formulation and program functions that include PEOs/PMs (program executive officers/program managers), MACOMs (major Army commands), and other services. PM Soldier served as the AMC Executive Agent for the Soldier Enhancement Program (SEP).

In September 1994, PM Soldier reorganized into five teams and a Logistics Management Office.

PM Soldier comprised the following teams (in addition to the Logistics Management Office):

- Clothing and Individual Equipment
- Land Warrior
- Crew Warrior
- Soldier Enhancement Program
- Business Management

=== PEO Soldier ===
PEO Soldier was stood up in April 2002. On 7 June 2002, the Assistant Secretary of the Army for Acquisition, Logistics, and Technology aka ASA(ALT) re-designated PM Soldier to PEO Soldier (Program Executive Office Soldier), or Team Soldier at Fort Belvoir, Virginia. The change was made to address concerns surrounding the Land Warrior program’s complexity and the need for additional oversight of the program. This elevated the top-level management from an O-6/Colonel level to an O-7/Brigadier General level.

The first commander of PEO Soldier was Brigadier General James R. Moran.

== Organization ==
Project Manager, Soldier Protection and Individual Equipment (PM SPIE) is responsible for the development and implementation of soldier protection items, uniforms, and parachute systems.

- Product Manager, Soldier Protective Equipment (PdM SPE) is tasked with developing and deploying force protection equipment designed to defeat ballistic and fragmentation threats in theater. PM SPE is responsible for providing body armor, helmets, and other gear that reduces the risk of serious injury.
- Product Manager, Soldier Clothing and Individual Equipment (PdM SCIE) supports soldiers in operational environments by providing safe, durable, and operationally effective individual and unit equipment. PM SCIE focuses on enhancing survivability through the use of technologically advanced tactical and environmental protective clothing, individual chemical protective gear, and personnel parachutes, as well as other airdrop equipment.

Project Manager, Soldier Lethality (PM SL) aims to enhance soldiers' capabilities by improving current systems and developing next-generation weapons technology. It prioritizes the equipping of soldiers with weapon systems, ammunition, and associated target acquisition/fire-control products, both in the present and the future.

- Product Manager, Crew Served Weapons (PdM CSW) is responsible for research and development of current and future light to heavy machine guns, grenade launchers, small arms ammunition, remote weapons stations, and related target acquisition/fire control products.
- Product Manager, Individual Weapons (PdM IW) is responsible for research and development of current rifles, carbines, pistols, shotguns, grenade launchers, small arms ammunition, and related target acquisition/fire control products.
- Product Manager, Next Generation Weapons (PdM NGW) is responsible for research and development of future squad-level weapons, ammunition, and related target acquisition/fire control products.

Project Manager, Soldier Sensors and Lasers (PM SSL) provides soldiers with improved lethality, mobility, and survivability in all weather and visibility conditions. Soldier-borne sensors and lasers enhance a soldier's ability to see in all battlefield and lighting conditions, to acquire objects of military significance before detection and to target threat objects accurately for engagement by soldiers or guided munitions. These systems provide critical, on-the-ground direct support to U.S. forces.

- Product Manager, Soldier Maneuver Sensors (PdM SMS) provides soldiers with products for enhanced vision, improved targeting, and greater lethality.
- Product Manager, Soldier Precision Targeting Devices (PdM SPTD) develops and fields systems that accurately locate and designate targets for engagement with precision munitions.

Project Manager, Soldier Warrior (PM SWAR) supports soldiers through the acquisition of integrated soldier systems. Current systems include Land Warrior, Ground Soldier, Mounted Soldier, and Air Warrior. PM SWAR assembles components into complete systems designed to increase combat effectiveness, decrease combat load, and improve mission flexibility.

- Product Manager, Air Warrior (PdM AW) integrates all aviation life support and mission equipment into an ensemble that improves the combat effectiveness of the Army aircrew member. This system leverages several joint service technology efforts to create a modular system that increases situational awareness and freedom of movement at the flight controls, enhances mobility to safely operate aircraft systems, reduces physiological stress, facilitates aircraft entry and exit, and provides survival gear in the event of a downed aircraft over land or water.
- Product Manager, Ground Soldier (PdM GS) provides improved situational awareness and battle command through the current system, Land Warrior (LW), and the future system, Ground Soldier Ensemble (GSE). Digital imagery and GPS locations provided by LW/GSE enable detailed mission planning, ramp-side convoy briefings, and on-the-fly changes during missions for high-value targets (HVTs). LW/GSE allows teams, squads, and platoons to pinpoint the location of improvised explosive devices (IEDs), cells, or HVTs with improved speed and precision. LW/GSE enhances dismounted soldiers survivability by rapidly disseminating locations of suspected enemy IEDs and snipers. LW/GSE also helps prevent fratricide by providing locations of mounted forces and dismounted soldiers.
- Product Director, Soldier Systems Integration (PdD SSI) provides cross-product soldier hardware systems integration support to enable the PEO at the enterprise (aka responsibility area; here, soldiers) level to understand, visualize, and deliberately evolve the Soldier system into a mission-tailorable set of capability modules that function as a seamless, integrated suite and to memorialize the results of a deliberate, collaborative systems engineering process. Product Director SSI oversees the Tactical Communication and Protective System (TCAPS) program, the Soldier Power program, and administers the Soldier Enhancement Program (SEP) on behalf of PEO Soldier. The mission of SEP is to identify and evaluate commercial, off-the-shelf (COTS), government, off-the-shelf (GOTS), non-developmental items (NDI) in the form of individual weapons, munitions, optics, combat clothing, individual equipment, water supply, shelters, communication, and navigational aids which can be adopted and provided to soldiers.

== See also ==
- Program executive officer (PEO)
- Soldier Systems Center-Natick
- Military acquisition
