= Defense Acquisition Workforce Improvement Act =

The Defense Acquisition Workforce Improvement Act (DAWIA) is a United States law that requires the Department of Defense to establish education and training standards, requirements, and courses for the civilian and military workforce. It was initially enacted by Public Law 101-510 on November 5, 1990. It has been subsequently modified by amendments to the USC Title 10 Chapter 87.

== Background ==
In 1985, the DoD called for an extensive review of the education and training functions. At the same time, President Reagan established the Packard Commission to review the management of the DoD. Both studies indicated that acquisition workers were undertrained and inexperienced, resulting in the enactment of DAWIA as part of the FY 1991 National Defense Authorization Act.

== Content ==
The DoD Directive 5000 series set forth a unified approach that all services were to follow. As part of this the Defense Acquisition University (DAU) was established, a unified consortium of previously separate services and separate courses. The efforts to structure and advance acquisition led to 5 college-level campuses, producing works such as the Defense Acquisition Guide (DAG); library collections; publications of Defense AT&L Magazine and the Defense Acquisition Review Journal; the development of numerous courses including online learning; and professional conferences.

Civilian and military positions in the acquisition workforce have acquisition duties that fall into fifteen functional areas. For each area, certification is available at three levels typified as Level I Basic or Entry (GS5-9), Level II Intermediate or Journeyman (GS 9-12), and Level III Advanced or Senior (GS 13 and above):

- Auditing
- Business Cost Estimating and Financial Management (no longer use)
- Business Cost Estimating (as of 2010)
- Business Financial Management (as of 2010)
- Contracting
- Facilities Engineering
- Industrial/Contract Property Management
- Information Technology
- Life Cycle Logistics
- Production, Quality and Manufacturing
- Program Management
- Purchasing
- Small Business
- Systems Planning, Research, Development and Engineering – Program Systems Engineering (no longer use after 2013)
- Science and Technology Manager – Formerly known as Systems Planning, Research, Development and Engineering – Science and Technology Manager
- Engineering – Formerly known as Systems Planning, Research, Development and Engineering – Systems Engineering
- Test and Evaluation
