= Omar J. Jones IV =

U.S. Army general

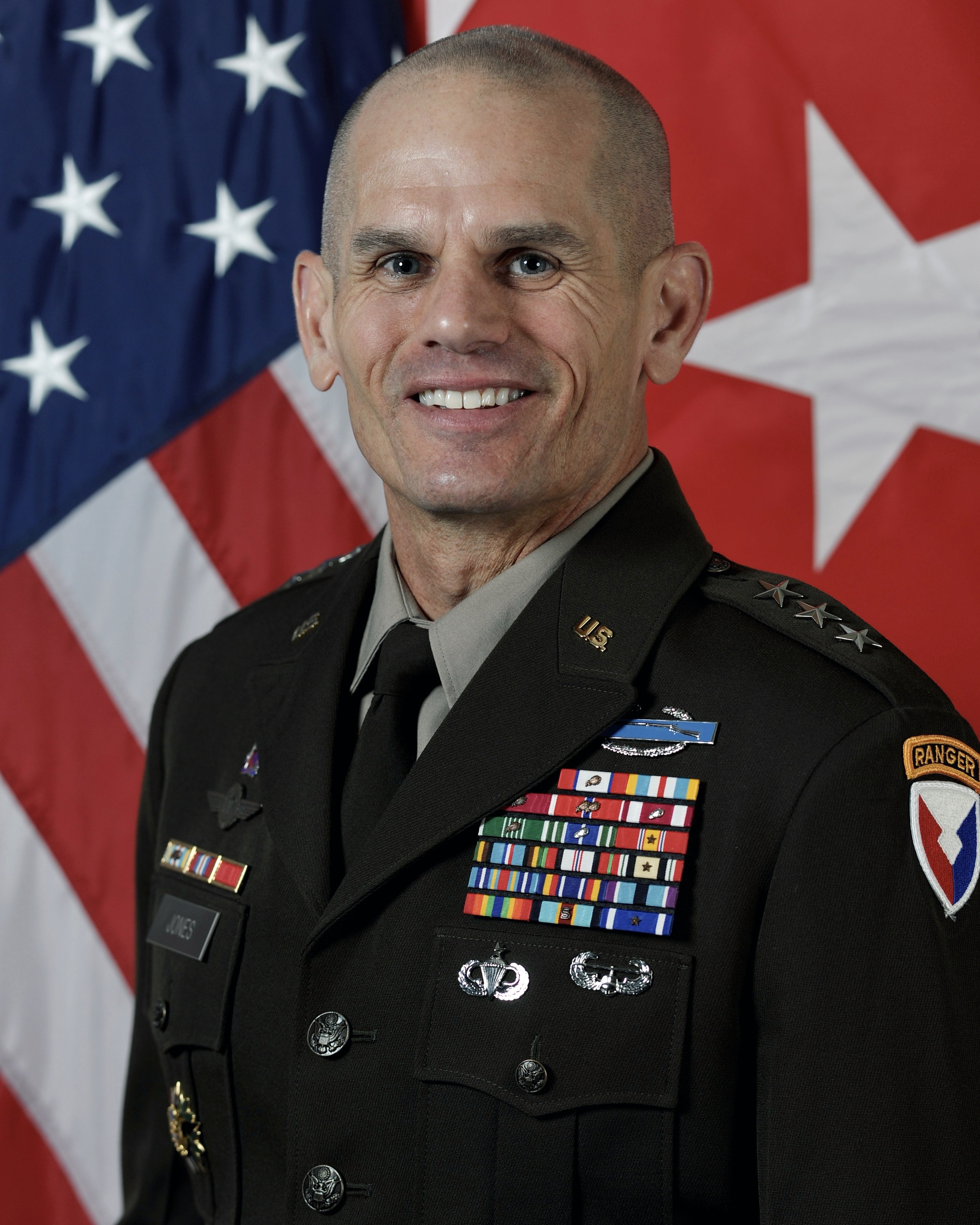
- Official portrait, 2022
- Born: Maryland, U.S.
- Military career
- Allegiance: United States
- Branch: United States Army
- Service years: 1992–2025
- Rank: Lieutenant General
- Commands: United States Army Installation Management Command; United States Army Military District of Washington; Joint Force Headquarters National Capital Region; 2nd Brigade Combat Team, 4th Infantry Division; 2nd Squadron, 2nd Stryker Cavalry Regiment
- Awards: Distinguished Service Medal (2); Defense Superior Service Medal; Legion of Merit (2); Bronze Star Medal (3); Meritorious Service Medal (6)

Omar James Jones IV is a retired United States Army lieutenant general who last served as the commanding general of the United States Army Installation Management Command from 2022 to 2025. He previously served as the deputy commanding general of the United States Army Installation Management Command from 2021 to 2022, and commanded the United States Army Military District of Washington and Joint Task Force – National Capital Region from 2019 to 2021.

Born in Maryland where his father was attending dental school in Baltimore, Jones graduated from Glenelg High School in 1988. He then attended the United States Military Academy, serving as First Captain for his class and graduating in 1992 with a B.S. degree in operations research. Jones later earned a Master of Public Administration degree from Harvard University and a master's degree in national security strategy from the National War College.

Jones retired in July 2025 at a ceremony at Joint Base Myer-Henderson Hall, Virginia on 31 July 2025.

== Personal ==
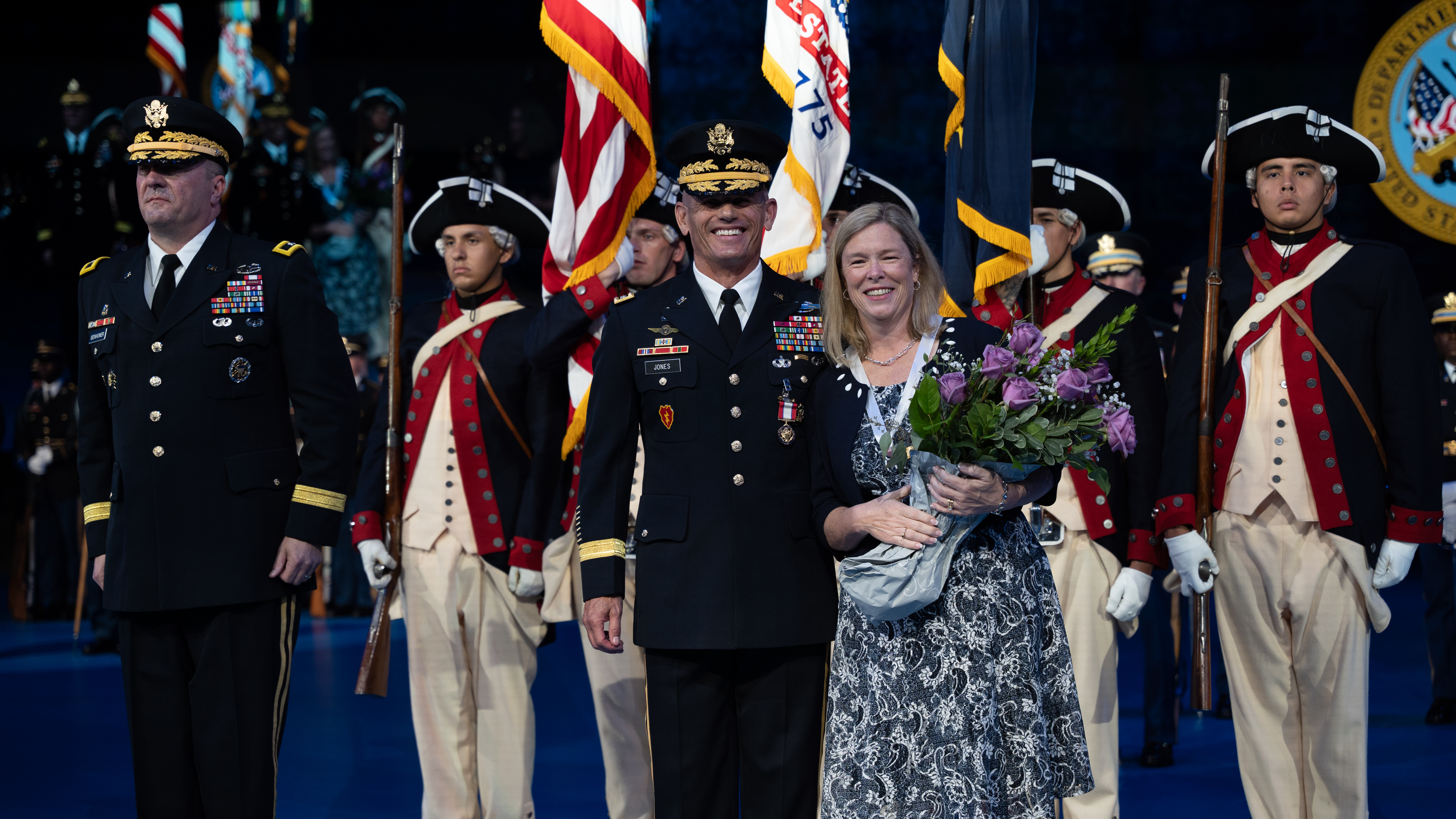
Lieutenant General Omar J. Jones retirement ceremony at Joint Base Myer-Henderson Hall, Virginia on 31 July 2025

Jones is the son of Omar J. Jones III and Carol Jones. His father was a dentist who served as an Army Dental Corps captain from 1973 to 1976. Jones has two sisters.

Jones married his high school classmate at West Point one day after his graduation in 1992. They have three sons, two of whom have also graduated from West Point.

Military offices
Preceded by Antonio Aguto	Deputy Commanding General (Operations) of the 7th Infantry Division; 2016–2017	Succeeded by Otto K. Liller
Preceded by Malcolm B. Frost	Chief of Public Affairs of the United States Army; 2017–2019	Succeeded by Amy E. Hannah
Preceded by Michael L. Howard	Commanding General of United States Army Military District of Washington and Commander of Joint Task Force – National Capital Region; 2019–2021	Succeeded by Allan Pepin
Preceded by Timothy McGuire	Deputy Commanding General of the United States Army Installation Management Command; 2021–2022	Succeeded by Thomas J. Tickner
Preceded by Douglas Gabram	Commanding General of the United States Army Installation Management Command; 2022–2025	Succeeded by James M. Smith; Acting
