= Robert M. Collins =

U.S. Army general

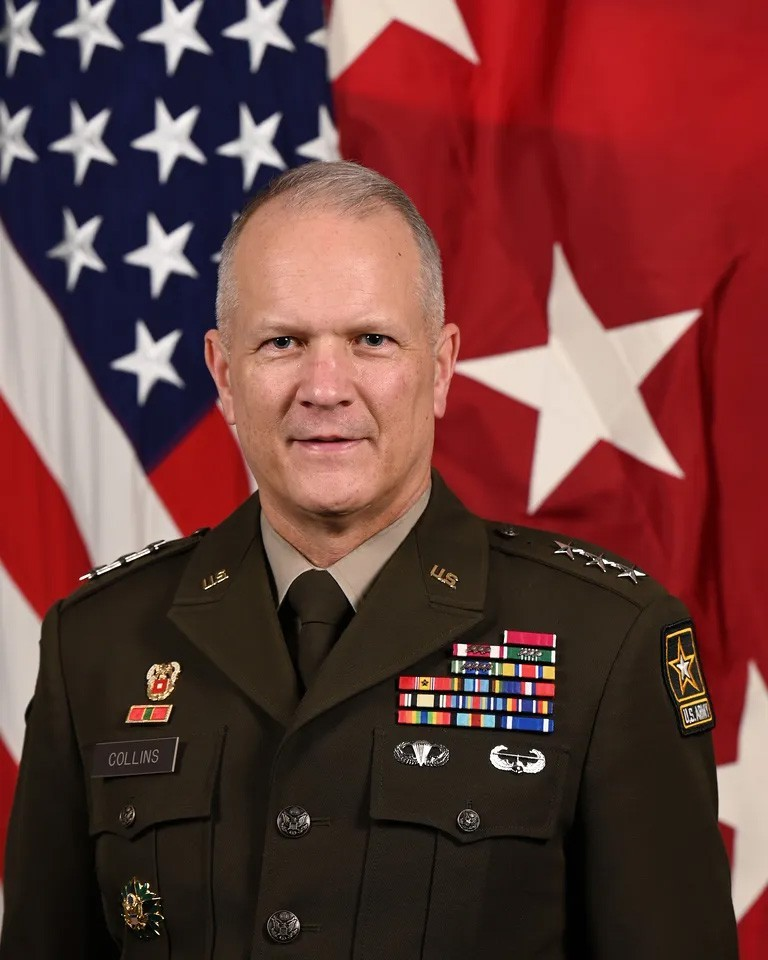
- Official portrait, 2024
- Military career
- Allegiance: United States
- Branch: United States Army
- Service years: 1992–present
- Rank: Lieutenant General
- Commands: United States Army Acquisition Corps
- Awards: Legion of Merit

Robert M. Collins is a United States Army lieutenant general who serves as the principal military deputy to the assistant secretary of the Army for acquisition, logistics, and technology and director of the United States Army Acquisition Corps. He previously served as the deputy for acquisition and systems management at the Office of the United States Assistant Secretary of the Army for Acquisition, Logistics, and Technology. Collins was commissioned as an Armor Officer through the Shippensburg University ROTC program where he majored in Criminal Justice.

In January 2023, Collins was nominated for promotion to lieutenant general.

Military offices
Preceded by Kirk F. Vollmecke	Program Executive Officer for Intelligence, Electronic Warfare, and Sensors of the United States Army; 2019–2020	Succeeded by Michael E. Sloane
Preceded by David G. Bassett	Program Executive Officer for Command, Control, and Communication (Tactical) of the United States Army; 2020–2022	Succeeded by Anthony W. Potts
Preceded by Christopher D. Schneider	Deputy for Acquisition and Systems Management at the Office of the United States Assistant Secretary of the Army for Acquisition, Logistics, and Technology; 2022–2024	Succeeded by Robert L. Barrie Jr.
Preceded by Robert L. Marion	Principal Military Deputy to the Assistant Secretary of the Army for Acquisition, Logistics, and Technology and Director of the United States Army Acquisition Corps; 2024–present	Incumbent
