= Timothy McGuire =

Retired U.S. Army general

Timothy P. (Tim) McGuire
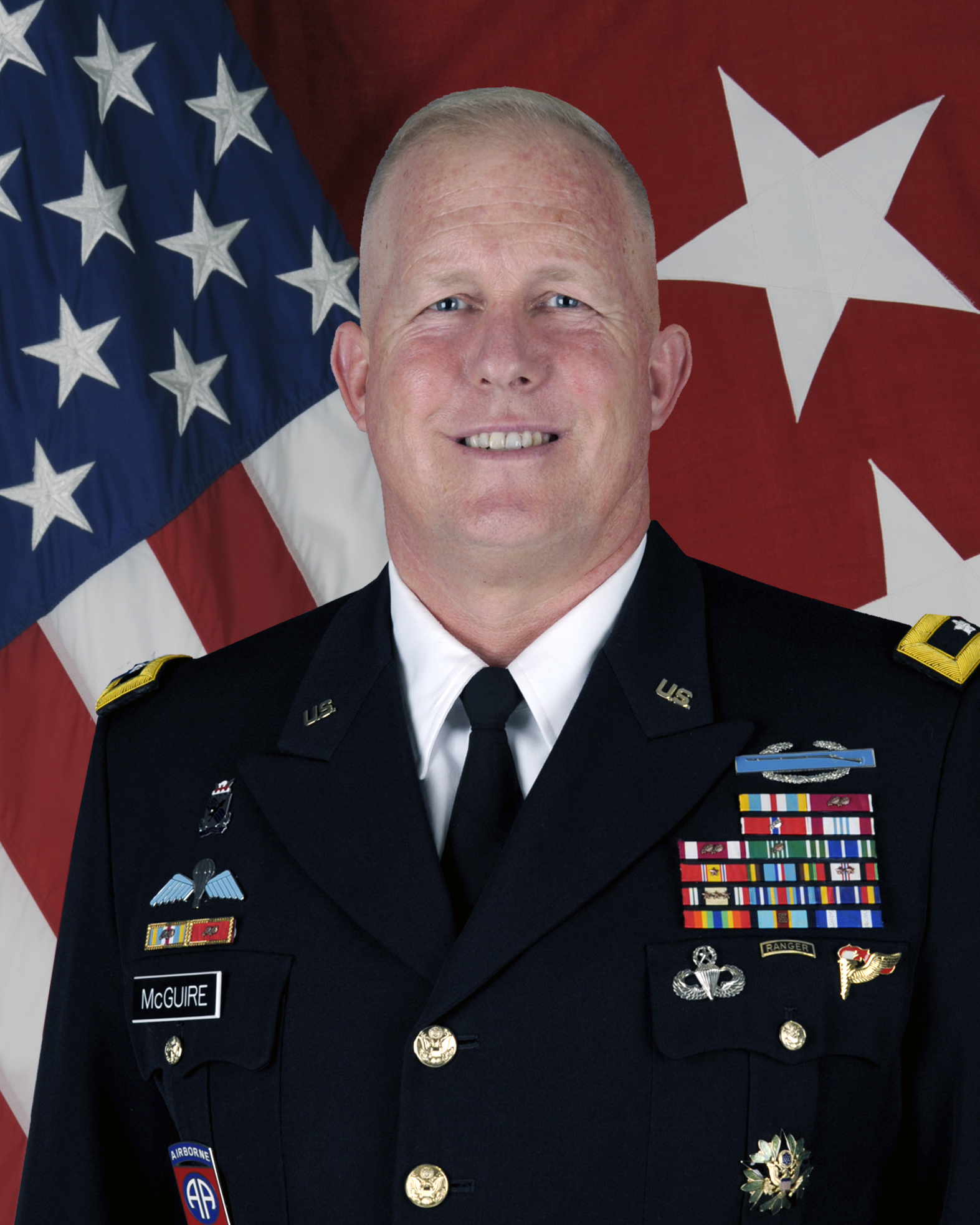
- Born: July 19, 1965 (age 61); California, U.S.
- Military career
- Allegiance: United States
- Branch: United States Army
- Service years: 1987–2021
- Rank: Major General
- Commands: Joint Readiness Training Center; Fort Polk

Timothy Patrick McGuire (born July 19, 1965) is a retired United States Army major general who last served as the Deputy Commanding General of the United States Army Installation Management Command from August 2018 to June 2021. Previously, he served as the Deputy Commanding General of United States Army Europe.

McGuire is a 1987 graduate of the United States Military Academy with a B.S. degree in diplomatic and strategic history. He later earned a master's degree in international relations from the University of Chile and a second master's degree in national security and strategic studies from the Naval War College.

Military offices
Preceded by Charles Q. Brown Jr.	Deputy Director for Operations of the United States Central Command; 2013–2015	Succeeded by ???
Preceded by William B. Hickman	Commanding General of the Joint Readiness Training Center and Fort Polk; 2015–2016	Succeeded by Gary Brito
Preceded by William Gayler	Deputy Commanding General of United States Army Europe; 2016–2018	Succeeded by Andrew M. Rohling
Preceded by Ben Hodges	Commanding General of United States Army Europe; Acting; 2017–2018	Succeeded by Christopher G. Cavoli
Preceded by Sean M. Jenkins	Deputy Commanding General of the United States Army Installation Management Command; 2018–2021	Succeeded by Omar J. Jones IV
Preceded by Bradley A. Becker	Commanding General of the United States Army Installation Management Command; Acting; 2019–2020	Succeeded by Douglas Gabram
