= Douglas Gabram =

U.S. Army general

Douglas M. Gabram
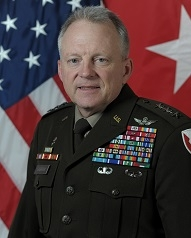
- Military career
- Allegiance: United States
- Branch: United States Army
- Service years: 1984–2022
- Rank: Lieutenant General
- Commands: United States Army Installation Management Command; United States Army Aviation and Missile Command
- Conflicts: Gulf War; War in Afghanistan; Iraq War
- Awards: Army Distinguished Service Medal (2); Legion of Merit (3); Bronze Star Medal (7)

Douglas M. Gabram is a retired United States Army lieutenant general who last served as the commanding general of the United States Army Installation Management Command. Previously, he served as the Director for Test of the Missile Defense Agency.

== Awards and decorations ==
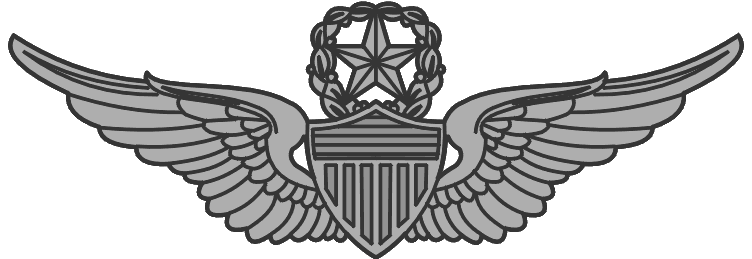
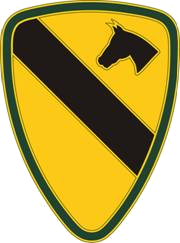
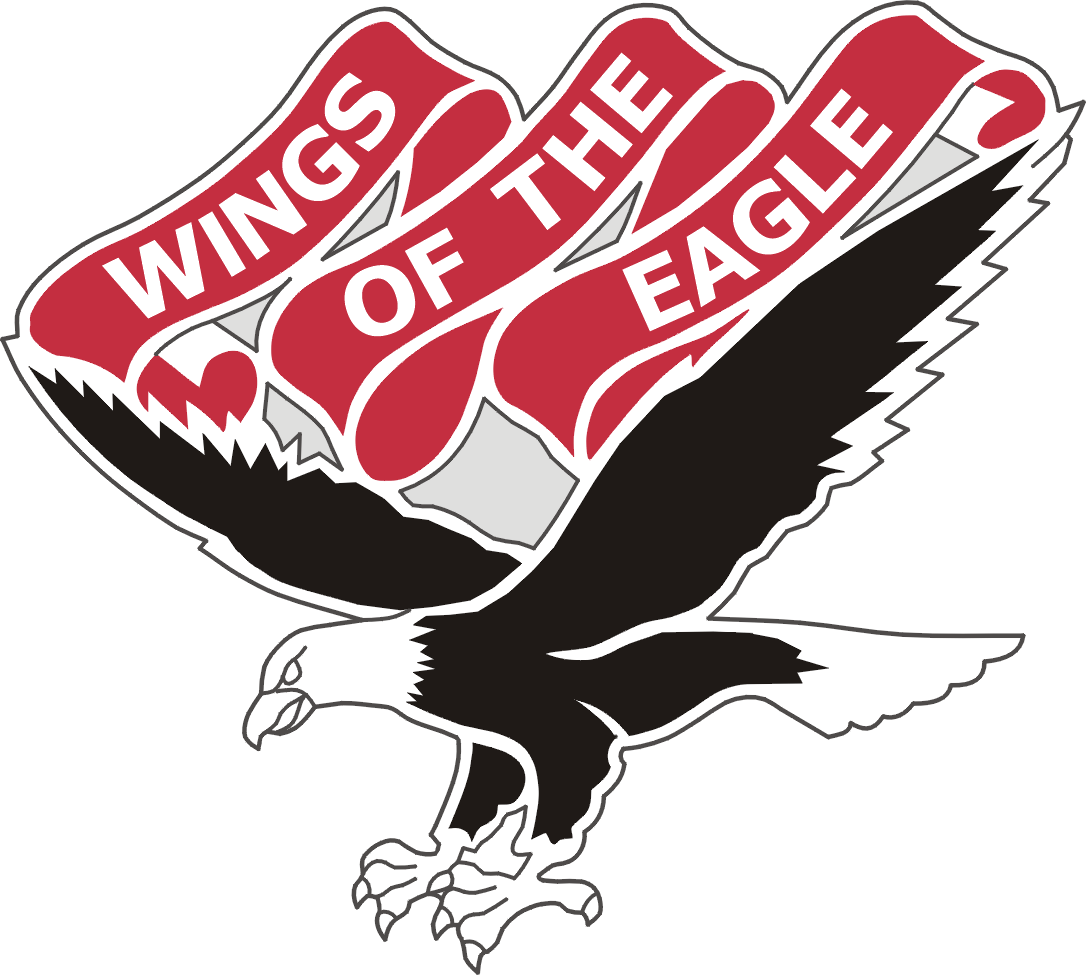
Master Army Aviator Badge
Basic Parachutist Badge
Air Assault Badge
1st Cavalry Division Combat Service Identification Badge
101st Aviation Regiment Distinctive Unit Insignia
10 Overseas Service Bars

Army Distinguished Service Medal with one bronze oak leaf cluster
Legion of Merit with two oak leaf clusters
Bronze Star Medal with six oak leaf clusters
Defense Meritorious Service Medal
Meritorious Service Medal with five oak leaf clusters
Air Medal with "V" device and bronze award numeral 4
Joint Service Commendation Medal with oak leaf cluster
Army Commendation Medal with oak leaf cluster
Army Achievement Medal
Joint Meritorious Unit Award
Valorous Unit Award
Meritorious Unit Commendation with two oak leaf clusters
Superior Unit Award
National Defense Service Medal with one bronze service star
Armed Forces Expeditionary Medal
Southwest Asia Service Medal with three service stars
Afghanistan Campaign Medal with two service stars
Iraq Campaign Medal with four service stars
Global War on Terrorism Expeditionary Medal
Global War on Terrorism Service Medal
Armed Forces Service Medal
Humanitarian Service Medal
Army Service Ribbon
Army Overseas Service Ribbon with award numeral 7
United Nations Medal
NATO Medal for service in ex-Yugoslavia
Kuwait Liberation Medal (Saudi Arabia)
Kuwait Liberation Medal (Kuwait)

Military offices
Preceded by Wilson A. Shoffner Jr.	Deputy Chief of Staff of the Operations, Plans, and Training of the United States Army Training and Doctrine Command; 2015–2016	Succeeded by Robert J. Ulses
Preceded by James M. Richardson	Commanding General of the United States Army Aviation and Missile Command; 2016–2019	Succeeded by Kenneth T. Royar
Preceded by Leon N. Thurgood	Director for Test of the Missile Defense Agency; 2019–2020	Succeeded by Michael T. Morrissey
Preceded by Timothy P. McGuire; Acting	Commanding General of the United States Army Installation Management Command; 2020–2022	Succeeded by Omar J. Jones IV
