= Program executive officer =

One of a few key individuals in the United States military acquisition process

A program executive officer, or PEO, is one of a few key individuals in the United States military acquisition process. Shown by the examples below, a program executive officer may be responsible for a specific program (e.g., the Joint Strike Fighter), or for an entire portfolio of similar programs (e.g., the Navy PEO for aircraft carriers).

- Army: The direct reports of the Army Acquisition Executive are program executive officers for the respective program executive offices (PEOs)

The current program executive officers include (but may not be limited to):

== Army ==
Each of the Army PEOs direct the Acquisition Executive's lines of effort, such as Ground combat systems. (Note: In 2016 Maj. Gen. Dave Bassett was PEO GCS In 2018 MG Bassett became PEO C3T — (Program Executive Office Command Control Communications-Tactical)) The PEOs work closely with the directors of Cross-functional teams of the Army's Futures Command.

- Armaments and Ammunition – MG John Reim, JPEO (Joint Program Executive Officer) A&A (formerly PEO Ammunition, or PEO Ammo) Picatinny Arsenal (New Jersey)
- Aviation – BG David Philips, PEO AVN Redstone Arsenal (Alabama)
- Chemical, Biological, Radiological and Nuclear Defense – Mr. Darryl Colvin, JPEO CBRND (formerly JPEO Chemical and Biological Defense, or JPEO CBD) Aberdeen Proving Ground, MD
- Combat Support and Combat Service Support – BG Camilla White, PEO CS & CSS Detroit Arsenal (Warren, Michigan)
- Command, Control, Communications, and Network – BG Shane Taylor (Acting), PEO C3N (formerly PEO Command, Control and Communications-Tactical, or PEO C3T) Aberdeen Proving Ground, MD
- Enterprise – Mr. William Hepworth, PEO Enterprise (formerly PEO Enterprise Information Systems, or PEO EIS) Fort Belvoir, VA
- Ground Combat Systems – Ms. Michelle Link (Acting), PEO GCS Detroit Arsenal (Warren, Michigan)
- Intelligence, Electronic Warfare and Sensors – BG Kevin Chaney, PEO IEW&S Aberdeen Proving Ground, MD
- Missiles and Space – MG Frank Lozano, PEO Missiles & Space Redstone Arsenal (Alabama)
- Rapid Capabilities (RCO) – Ms. Tanya Skeen, PEO RCO (Skeen has now moved to DoD, late 2018). In 2019, RCO became the Rapid Capabilities and Critical Technologies Office (RCCTO) The Pentagon (Arlington, Virginia), headed by Lt. Gen. Robert Rasch, formerly L. Neil Thurgood
- Simulation, Training, and Instrumentation – BG Christine Beeler, PEO STRI Orlando, FL
- Soldier – BG Troy Denomy, PEO Soldier Fort Belvoir, VA
- Assembled Chemical Weapons Alternatives – Ms. Tamika Atkins, PEO ACWA Aberdeen Proving Ground, MD

=== 2023 ===
In October 2023, changes to three PEOs' missions occurred. The restructure transferred network-related areas previously under multiple PEOs', to instead be under one PEO (for example, UAVs were studied by PEO Aviation and PEO Soldier). The network-related areas of interest were supplied by three PEOs, including: Intelligence, Electronic Warfare and Sensors (IEW&S); Command, Control and Communications-Tactical (C3T); and Enterprise Information Systems (EIS). The PEO for Intelligence, Electronic Warfare and Sensors (IEW&S) gained the responsibility for all cyber operations. The responsibility for tactical and enterprise network elements was assigned to PEO Command, Control and Communications-Tactical (PEO C3T). As part of the transfer, two PMs from PEO EIS were transferred to PEO IEW&S and PEO C3T. The realignment did not affect any Army positions or contracts.

== Navy ==
- Joint Strike Fighter
- Air ASW, Assault, and Special Mission Programs
- Aircraft carriers
- C4I
- Space
- Enterprise Information Systems
- Integrated Warfare
- Unmanned and Small Combatants (formerly Littoral and Mine Warfare)
- Ships
- Space Systems
- Strike Weapons and Unmanned Aviation
- Submarines
- Tactical Air Programs
- Land Systems (USMC)

== Air Force ==
Collaborative combat aircraft are being developed collaboratively by the PEO for fighter aircraft, the commanders of AFRL, Air Combat Command, Air Force Test Center, and USAF deputy chief of staff, plans and programs

- Aircraft Aeronautical Systems Center
- Agile Combat Systems (ACS)77th Aeronautical Systems Wing
- Intelligence, Surveillance, and Reconnaissance / Special Operation Forces (ISR/SOF)
- Fighters and Advanced Aircraft
- Mobility 516th Aeronautical Systems Wing
- KC-46A
- Command, Control, Communication, Infrastructure & Networks (C3I&N) Air Force Life Cycle Management Center
- Enterprise Logistics Systems
- Command and Control / Intelligence, Surveillance, and Reconnaissance (C2ISR)
- Cyber NetCentric
- Digital Air Force Life Cycle Management Center
- Enterprise Information Systems
- Nuclear Command and Control (NC3)
- Strategic Systems
- Weapons
- Services* Rapid Capability
- Joint Strike Fighter (JSF)

== Space Force ==
- Assured Access to Space (AATS or SSC/AA): Brig Gen Kristin Panzenhagen
- Battle Management Command, Control, and Communications (BMC3 or SSC/BC): Shannon Pallone
- Space Domain Awareness & Combat Power (SDACP or SSC/SZ): Col Byron E. C. McClain
- Military Communications & Positioning, Navigation, and Timing (MCPNT or SSC/CG): Cordell A. Delapena Jr.
- Space Sensing (SSC/SN): Col Robert W. Davis
- Operational Test and Training Infrastructure (OTTI or SSC/TI): Col Corey Klopstein
- Space Development Agency (SDA): Derek Tournear
- Space Rapid Capabilities Office (SpRCO): Kelly D. Hammett

== Military ==
- Health Systems
