= United States Assistant Secretary of the Army for Acquisition, Logistics, and Technology =

Civilian official in the U.S. Department of the Army

Assistant Secretary of the Army (Acquisition, Logistics, and Technology)
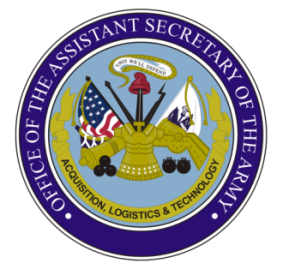
- Seal of the Office of the Assistant Secretary of the Army (Acquisition, Logistics, and Technology)

- Flag of an assistant secretary of the Army

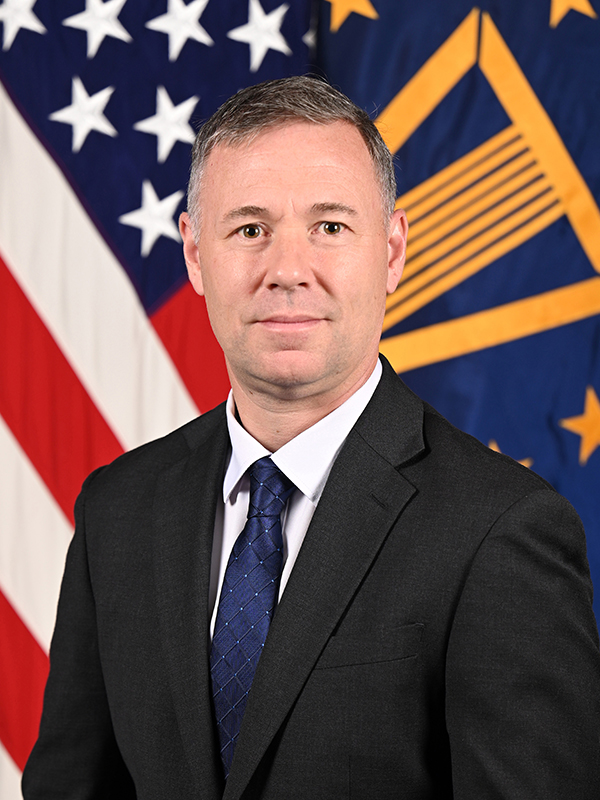
- Incumbent; Brent G. Ingraham since September 22, 2025
- United States Department of the Army
- Style: Mr. Secretary; The Honorable (formal address in writing)
- Reports to: Secretary of the Army; Under Secretary of the Army
- Seat: The Pentagon, Arlington County, Virginia, United States
- Nominator: The president with Senate advice and consent
- Term length: No fixed term
- Constituting instrument: 10. U.S.C. § 7016
- Formation: May 29, 1998
- First holder: Paul J. Hoeper
- Succession: Joint 17th in SecDef succession in seniority of appointment
- Deputy: Principal Deputy Assistant Secretary of the Army for Acquisition, Logistics, and Technology
- Salary: Executive Schedule, Level IV
- Website: Official website

The Assistant Secretary of the Army for Acquisition, Logistics, and Technology (ASA(ALT) /ˈeɪsɑːlt/ A-salt) is a civilian office in the United States Department of the Army. The office of ASA(ALT) is abbreviated as OASA(ALT), and commonly refers to its leader and sub-offices. OASA(ALT) serves, when delegated, as: the army acquisition executive, the senior procurement executive, the science advisor to the secretary of the Army, and as the senior research and development official for the Department of the Army. The OASA(ALT) also has principal responsibility for all Department of the Army matters related to logistics.

The current Principal Military Deputy OASA (ALT) is LTG Robert M. Collins.

== History ==
Effective February 16, 1999, Secretary of the Army Louis Caldera directed the logistics mission and functions of the assistant secretary of the Army (installations, logistics and environment), or ASA (IL&E), be transferred under the operational control of the assistant secretary of the Army (research, development and acquisition), known as ASA (RDA). As such, the office of the ASA (RDA) was renamed the assistant secretary of the Army (acquisition, logistics and technology), abbreviated ASA (ALT), and the office of ASA (IL&E) was renamed the assistant secretary of the Army (installations and environment), or ASA (I&E).

== Organization ==
- Assistant Secretary of the Army for Acquisition, Logistics, and Technology
  - Principal Deputy Assistant Secretary of the Army for Acquisition, Logistics, and Technology
    - Deputy Assistant Secretary of the Army for Defense Exports and Cooperation
    - Deputy Assistant Secretary of the Army for Plans, Programs and Resources
    - Deputy Assistant Secretary of the Army for Procurement
    - Deputy Assistant Secretary of the Army for Research and Technology
      - Pathway for Innovation and Technology (PIT)
    - Deputy Assistant Secretary of the Army for Strategy and Acquisition Reform
    - Deputy Assistant Secretary of the Army for Sustainment
    - Deputy for Acquisition and Systems Management (DASM)
  - Principal Military Deputy/Director Acquisition Career Management/Chief Integration Officer (Note: By law, portfolio acquisition executives (PAEs), capability program executives (CPEs), and program executive offices (PEOs) have direct access, and report directly to the army acquisition executive in connection with all program matters.)
    - Director, US Army Acquisition Support Center (USAASC)
    - Portfolio acquisition executives (PAE) (dual reporting structure to T2COM for requirements, and ASA(ALT) for acquisition)
      - PAE Agile Sustainment and Ammunition (AS&A)
      - PAE Command and Control/Counter-Command and Control (C2/CC2)
      - PAE Fires
      - PAE Layered Protection and CBRN Defense
      - PAE Maneuver Air
      - PAE Maneuver Ground
    - Capability program executives (CPEs)
      - CPE Ammunition and Energetics (A&E)
      - CPE Aviation
      - CPE CBRN Defense
      - CPE Combat Logistics (CL)
      - CPE Command and Control Information Network (C2IN)
      - CPE Defensive Fires
      - CPE Enterprise Software and Services (ES2)
      - CPE Ground
      - CPE Integrated Fires
      - CPE Intelligence and Spectrum Warfare (ISW)
      - CPE Mission Autonomy (MA)
      - CPE Offensive Fires
      - CPE Simulation, Training, Test and Threat (ST3)

== In role of service acquisition executive ==
The ASA(ALT) is delegated the role of acquisition executive.

=== Acquisition offices ===
Prior to late 2025 to early 2026, the Army used program executive offices for procurement and program management.

Program executive offices (PEOs) and joint PEOs:

- JPEO Armaments and Ammunition (A&A)
- JPEO Chemical, Biological, Radiological and Nuclear Defense (CBRND)
- PEO Assembled Chemical Weapons Alternatives (ACWA)
- PEO Aviation
- PEO Combat Support and Combat Service Support (CS&CSS)
- PEO Command, Control, Communications, and Network (C3N)
- PEO Enterprise
- PEO Ground Combat Systems (GCS)
- PEO Intelligence, Electronic Warfare and Sensors (IEW&S)
- PEO Missiles and Space (MS)
- PEO Simulation, Training and Instrumentation (STRI)
- PEO Soldier

On November 7, 2025, the Army launched an overhaul of its procurement process. The Army replaced its program executive offices (PEOs) with portfolio acquisition executives (PAEs) and capability program executives (CPEs).

The new acquisition construct, as follows:

Former	Reorganized	
Program executive offices	Capability program executives	Portfolio acquisition executive
JPEO Armaments and Ammunition; PEO Combat Support and Combat Service Support	CPE Ammunition and Energetics; CPE Combat Logistics	PAE Agile Sustainment and Ammunition
PEO Aviation	CPE Aviation; CPE Mission Autonomy	PAE Maneuver Air
PEO Ground Combat Systems; PEO Soldier	CPE Ground	PAE Maneuver Ground
PEO Command, Control, Communications, and Network; PEO Intelligence, Electronic Warfare and Sensors; PEO Simulation, Training and Instrumentation	CPE Command and Control Information Network; CPE Intelligence and Spectrum Warfare; CPE Simulation, Training, Test and Threat	PAE Command and Control/Counter-Command and Control
PEO Missiles and Space; Rapid Capabilities and Critical Technologies Office	CPE Defensive Fires; CPE Integrated Fires; CPE Offensive Fires	PAE Fires
JPEO CBRN Defense	CPE CBRN Defense	PAE Layered Protection and CBRN Defense

== Publications ==
The ASA(ALT) was responsible for Army AL&T magazine, a quarterly publication addressing army technology and logistics topics. The magazine ceased issue in July 2025, and was replaced by online articles.

First issued as Army Research and Development magazine in December 1960, and published by the Army Research Office (ARO), the magazine covered topics in army technology and logistics. The magazine was placed under the assistant secretary of the army for research, development and acquisition (ASA (RDA)) in 1980, and was renamed as Army RD&A. In 2000, the magazine was placed under the assistant secretary of the army for acquisition, logistics and technology (ASA (ALT)), and was renamed as Army AL&T.

=== Timeline ===
- December 1960 – First issue, named Army Research and Development magazine (also Army R&D); published monthly (Note: From 1961 to 1973, publications of Army R&D were occasionally combined.)
- 1973 – Changed publication to six times per year at the start of 1973 (Note: From 1961 to 1973, publications of Army R&D were occasionally combined.)
- 1980 – Renamed Army RD&A
- 2000 – Renamed Army AL&T
- 2006 – Changed to quarterly publication at the start of 2006
- 2019 – Beginning in spring 2019, publication dates were changed from month spans to seasons (e.g., issues previously named July–September, were now known as a Summer issue)
- Summer 2025 – Final issue of Army AL&T

Source(s): (Note: For 1972 Army Research and Development magazine issues (omitted from the USAASC website's AL&T archive webpage as of April 2026), see selection of available copies at archive.org in § External links.)

== Officeholders ==
No.	Portrait	Name	Term of office			Secretary(s) served under	President appointed by
No.	Portrait	Name	Took office	Left office	Time in office	Secretary(s) served under	President appointed by
1	Hoeper	Paul J. Hoeper	May 29, 1998	January 20, 2001	2 years, 236 days	Louis Caldera	Bill Clinton
–	Oscar	Kenneth J. Oscar (acting)	January 20, 2001	February 1, 2002	1 year, 12 days	Thomas E. White	George W. Bush
2	Bolton	Claude M. Bolton Jr.	February 1, 2002	January 2, 2008	5 years, 335 days	Thomas E. White; Francis J. Harvey; Pete Geren	George W. Bush
–	Popps	Dean G. Popps (acting)	January 2, 2008	March 4, 2010	2 years, 61 days	Pete Geren; John M. McHugh	George W. Bush; Barack Obama
3	O'Neill	Malcolm Ross O'Neill	March 4, 2010	June 3, 2011	1 year, 91 days	John M. McHugh	Barack Obama
4	Shyu	Heidi Shyu	June 4, 2011	January 30, 2016	4 years, 240 days	John M. McHugh; Eric Fanning (acting); Patrick Murphy (acting)	Barack Obama
5		Katrina McFarland	February 1, 2016	November 1, 2016	274 days	Patrick Murphy (acting); Eric Fanning	Barack Obama
–		Steffanie Easter (acting)	November 2, 2016	November 8, 2017	1 year, 6 days	Eric Fanning; Robert M. Speer (acting)	Barack Obama
–		Jeffrey S. White (acting)	November 8, 2017	January 1, 2018	54 days	Ryan McCarthy; Mark Esper	Donald Trump; Joe Biden
6		Bruce D. Jette	January 2, 2018	January 21, 2021	3 years, 19 days	Mark Esper; Ryan McCarthy; John Whitley (acting)	Donald Trump; Joe Biden
–		Douglas R. Bush (acting)	January 21, 2021	February 11, 2022	1 year, 21 days	John Whitley (acting); Christine Wormuth	Joe Biden
7		Douglas R. Bush	February 11, 2022	January 20, 2025	2 years, 344 days	Christine Wormuth	Joe Biden
–		Patrick Mason (acting)	January 20, 2025	May 5, 2025	105 days	Mark Averill (acting); Daniel P. Driscoll	Donald Trump
–		Jesse D. Tolleson (acting)	May 5, 2025	September 22, 2025	140 days	Daniel P. Driscoll	Donald Trump
8		Brent G. Ingraham	September 22, 2025	Present	1 year, 25 days	Daniel P. Driscoll; Adam Telle (acting)	Donald Trump

== Office symbol ==
In accordance with Army Regulation 25–59, the ASA(ALT) office symbol is SAAL-ZA. Sub-offices of the ASA(ALT) are also assigned office symbols.

== See also ==
- Army Science Board
- Structure of the United States Army
- List of positions filled by presidential appointment with Senate confirmation

Related positions

- Assistant Secretary of the Navy (Research, Development and Acquisition)
- Assistant Secretary of the Air Force (Acquisition, Technology and Logistics)
- Assistant Secretary of the Air Force (Space Acquisition and Integration)
- Under Secretary of Defense for Acquisition and Sustainment
