= Guiding Light (1937–1949) =

The Guiding Light (TGL) is an American radio series which became a television soap opera.

== Show development ==
The series was created by Emmons Carlson and Irna Phillips, who based it on personal experiences. After giving birth to a still-born baby at age 19, she found spiritual comfort listening to sermons by a preacher of a church centered on the brotherhood of man. These sermons formed the nucleus of the creation of The Guiding Light, which began as a radio show. From 1937 to 1946, the show was broadcast from Chicago on the NBC radio network.

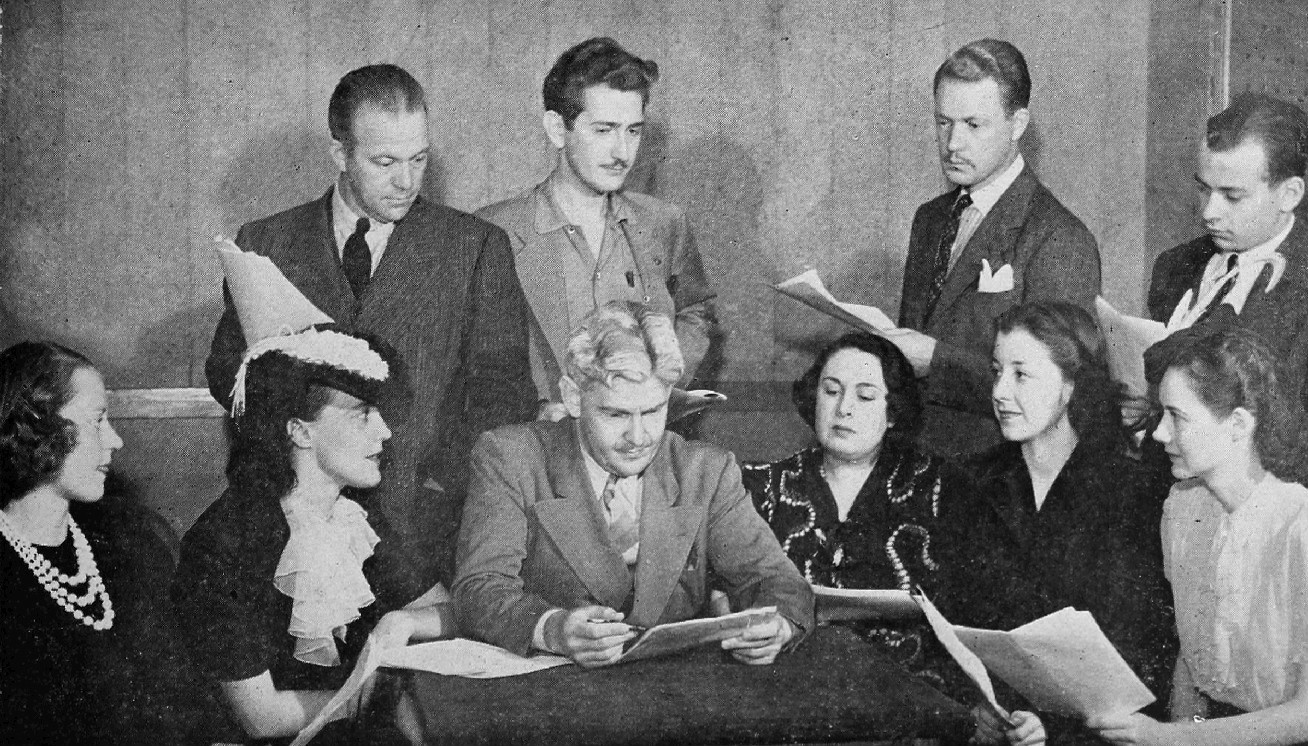
Cast of the show in December 1940. Front row from left: Ruth Bailey (Rose Kransky), Gladys Heene (Torchy Reynolds), Arthur Peterson Jr. (Dr. John Ruthledge), Mignon Schreiber (Mrs. Kransky), Muriel Bremner (Fredericka Lang), Betty Arnold (Iris Marsh), Back row from left: Bill Bouchey (Charles Cunningham), Paul Barnes (Jack Felzer), Phil Dakin (Ellis Smith), Seymour Young (Jacob Kransky)

The show was canceled by NBC twice, once in 1939 and once in 1946. The first time on October 13, 1939, it was brought back by the popular demand of the listening audience and began again only four months later, on January 22, 1940. (Although some of the characters, Rose Kransky and part of her family, briefly transitioned to another Phillips' creation, The Right to Happiness, with Phillips bringing back the characters to The Guiding Light when NBC restarted the show.) The November 29, 1946, NBC cancellation coincided with the Federal Communications Commission forcing a split of NBC and the creation of the ABC network. CBS would pick up the show seven months later, on June 2, 1947. CBS would be where the show would stay until its cancellation on television in September 2009.

Procter & Gamble was the original sponsor of The Guiding Light until March 16, 1942, when General Mills started sponsorship. Procter & Gamble would again sponsor the show when CBS picked up the show on June 2, 1947.

The show started in the locale of Five Points, a fictional enclave neighborhood of Chicago, but in 1947 when CBS brought back the show, the locale transitioned to the fictional suburb of Los Angeles, Selby Flats.

From 1943 to 1946, The Guiding Light and two other Phillips-created soaps (Woman in White and Today's Children) were aired as a programming block known collectively as The General Mills Hour, with Guiding Light cast member Ed Prentiss acting as master of ceremonies. Major characters made crossover appearances between the three shows, and at one point during this period, Phillips considered the experiment of running the individual program segments longer or shorter than the then-traditional quarter-hour. However, the Hour was disbanded before Phillips could proceed further with the idea.

From 1947 to 1949, the show was broadcast from Hollywood, but in the fall of 1949 the show moved to New York City where it remained or was based until the show was canceled in September 2009.

== Major characters ==
The Ruthledges/Holdens

- Reverend Dr. John Ruthledge (Arthur Peterson Jr., 1937 to 1946)
- Mary Ruthledge Holden (Mercedes McCambridge, 1937 to 1939; Sarajane Wells, 1939 to 1941 and 1943 to 1944; Vivian Fridell, 1942)
- Ned Holden (Ed Prentiss, 1937 to 1947)
- Frances Holden AKA Fredericka Lang (Peggy Fuller, 1937 to 1939; Muriel Brenner, 1939 to 1940)
- Paul Holden (Ed Prentiss, 1937 to 1938)
- Torchy Reynolds Holden (Gladys Heen, 1939 to 1941; Dorothy Reynolds, 1942)

The Bauers/Roberts/Whites

- Meta Bauer White Roberts AKA Jan Carter (Gloria Blondell, June 1948 to September 24, 1948; Dorothy Lovett, September 27, 1948 to August 26, 1949; Jone Allison, September 22, 1949 to June 27, 1952)
- Theodore "Ted" White (Arnold Moss, 1948 to 1949; Bert Cowlan, 1949 to 1950; James Monk, 1950)
- Friedrich "Papa" Bauer (Theodore von Eltz, August 31, 1948 to September 21, 1949; Theo Goetz, September 22, 1949 to June 27, 1952)
- "Mama" Bauer (Gloria Brandt, September 1948 to August 26, 1949; Adelaide Klein, September 22, 1949 to December 14, 1949)
- William Edward "Bill" Bauer, Sr. (Lyle Sudrow, September 27, 1948 to June 27, 1952)
- Gertrude "Trudy" Bauer Palmer (Laurette Fillbrant, September 27, 1948 to September 21, 1949; Charlotte Holland, September 22, 1949 to 1951; Helen Wagner, January 1952 to June 27, 1952, June 30, 1952 to August 22, 1952)
- Bertha "Bert" Miller Bauer (Ann Shepard, September 22, 1949 to January 20, 1950; Charita Bauer, February 3, 1950 to June 27, 1952)
- Joe Roberts (Larry Haines, 1950 to 1951; Herbert "Herb" Nelson, 1951 to 1952)
- Joey Roberts (Tarry Green, 1950 to 1952)
- Katherine "Kathy" Roberts Lang Grant (Susan Douglas, 1950 to 1952)
- Dr. Richard "Dick" Grant, Jr. (James Lipton, 1951 to 1952)
- Bob Lang, Kathy's first husband
- Charles "Chuckie" White, Ted and Meta's son

Other characters

- Rose Kransky Greenman (Ruth Bailey, 1937 to 1941; Louise Fitch, 1942; Charlotte Manson, 1942 to 1943)
- Charles Cunningham (Willis B. Bouchey, 1937 to 1939 and 1940 to 1941)
- Ellis Smith AKA Gordon Ellis AKA Mr. Nobody From Nowhere (Raymond Edward Johnson, 1937 to 1939; Sam Wanamaker, 1939 to 1940; Phil Dakin, 1940; Marvin Miller, 1940 to 1942; Karl Weber, 1942)
- Claire Marshall Lawrence MacNeill (Eloise Kummer, 1943 to 1946; Sharon Grainger, 1946)
- Ray Brandon AKA Roger Barton, Sr. (Donald Briggs, 1946 to 1947 and 1950 to 1951; Willard Waterman, 1947 to 1949; Staats Cotsworth, 1949 to 1950)
- Julie Barton Collins (Mary Lansing, 1946 to 1947)
- Reverend Dr. Paul Keeler (Bernard Lenrow, 1946 and 1949 to 1950; Bill Smith, 1950 to 1952)
- Reverend Dr. Charles Matthews (Hugh Studebaker, 1947 to 1949)
- Frank Collins (Willis B. Bouchey, 1947)
- Charlotte Wilson Brandon (Gertrude Warner, 1947; Betty Lou Gerson, 1947 to 1948; Lesley Woods, 1949 to 1951)
- Dr. Mary Leland (Anne Seymour, 1948 to 1951)
- Dr. Ross Boling (Karl Weber, 1949 to 1951)
- Gloria La Rue (Anne Burr McDermott, 1950 to 1951)
- Richard Hanley (Mandell Kramer, 1950; Maurice Tarplin, 1951)
- Peggy Ashley Regan (Jane Webb, 1951)

== Plot development ==
The radio show's original storyline centers on a preacher named Rev. John Ruthledge and all the people of a fictional suburb in Chicago called Five Points. The townspeople's lives all revolve around him, and the show's title refers to a lamp in his study that family and residents can see as a sign for them to find help when needed. Early ongoing storylines contrasted Ellis Smith (nicknamed Mr. Nobody from Nowhere) with Rev. Ruthledge. The former's cynicism often acts as a foil to the latter's optimism. Rev. Ruthledge's daughter Mary also embarked on a secret romance with her foster brother Ned Holden. Ned and Mary would eventually marry in a 1941 episode of the soap with Rev Ruthledge's blessing, but not before a series of complications arose. One such complication is the return of Ned's parents, Frances and Paul Holden. This storyline results in Frances shooting Paul dead when he makes his plans to extort money from Ned known. Another complication is Ned's marriage to and subsequent divorce from lounge singer Torchy Reynolds (who later ended up in a relationship with Ellis Smith). Storylines in this era also touched on topics rarely discussed up to that point — for example, the character of Rose Kransky had radio's first out-of-wedlock baby.

During the radio years, succeeding preachers carried on the work Rev. Ruthledge had started, thus becoming keepers of the "guiding light." The show's setting moved to another fictional suburb in 1947, Selby Flats, in the Los Angeles, California area. The Bauers became central to the storyline in 1948.

== See also ==
- List of radio soap operas

== Listen to ==
- Guiding Light (July 15, 1940)
