= Ruth Bailey =

American stage and radio actress (1905–1989)

- Born: June 8, 1913
- Died: September 20, 1989 (aged 76)
- Occupation: Actress
- Known for: Guiding Light

Ruth Emilissa Bailey (June 8, 1913 – September 20, 1989) was an American actress on stage and on old-time radio. After her acting years, she became a producer at a theater in Cincinnati.

== Early years ==
Bailey was born in Pittsburgh. Her father was an official with the New York Central Railroad. Her parents were opposed to her having a career in acting, but she studied at the Goodman School of Theater in Chicago anyway in addition to attending Vassar College.

== Career ==
Bailey gained acting experience at the Pasadena Playhouse and, while in California, made some short films. Her career developed further after she moved to Chicago, where she performed on stage and radio. Her radio roles included Alice Day on Woman in White, Rose on Guiding Light, and Rose Kransky on The Right to Happiness. Other programs on which she appeared included Jane's Grief, Bachelor's Children, Today's Children, and Girl Alone.

Bailey performed on television in Cincinnati, including having the role of Death Valley Daisy, hostess of WLWT's broadcasts of Western films and starring in The Storm on WKRC.

In 1955, Bailey founded Cherry County Playhouse in Traverse City, Michigan. The theater used a resident company of actors supplemented by stars of film and television. Bailey was a hands-on producer, selecting stars, selecting plays, and negotiating contracts, among other responsibilities. She sold the theater in 1975.

Her other business activities included serving as president and manager of E & J Swigart Co. in Cincinnati.

== Personal life ==
On April 12, 1939, Bailey married attorney Eugene Swigart Jr. They moved to Cincinnati in 1947. She was active in civic affairs in Cincinnati, including working with the Cincinnati Garden Center, the Modern Art Society, the Women's Committee of the Symphony, and the School for the Creative and Performing Arts.

== Death ==
On September 20, 1989, Bailey died at age 76 at her home in the Mount Lookout neighborhood of Cincinnati.
