= Eugene Karlin =

American illustrator and artist (1918–2003)

Eugene Karlin (December 15, 1918 – November 20, 2003) was an American illustrator and artist. He was best known for his magazine illustrations and fine art drawings, serving as a staff artist for Fortune magazine in the 1940s and later contributing to publications such as Esquire, The New Republic, and Playboy. Karlin's paintings and illustrations were also exhibited in major art museums, including the Metropolitan Museum of Art. In addition to his commercial work, he taught at several art and design schools and produced landscape and figurative artworks that blended realism with abstraction. Karlin's career bridged the worlds of graphic illustration and fine art over the mid-20th century.

== Early life and education ==
Karlin was born in Kenosha, Wisconsin, on December 15, 1918. His family moved to Chicago during his childhood, and he showed early artistic talent. As a boy he took art lessons at Jane Addams' Hull House in Chicago. Karlin attended Senn High School in Chicago, where a special art curriculum was arranged for him. A 1938 article in the Kenosha Evening News reported that Karlin, then 19, had been awarded a scholarship to the Art Students League of New York, one of ten awarded internationally that year. The article described him as the son of Mr. and Mrs. Isadore Karlin, formerly of Kenosha, and noted that he had previously attended Durkee School. Karlin had won scholarships to the Art Institute of Chicago, the Academy of Fine Arts, the Harrison Commercial Art School, and the Professional School of Art. He also chaired the Cartoonists Exhibit and was active in the Chicago Cartoonist Guild.

Karlin's early training included studies at the Art Institute of Chicago, the Art Students League in New York, and the Colorado Springs Fine Arts Center. According to art historian Bob Forrest, Karlin's time at the Art Students League was pivotal in shaping his mastery of pen-and-ink illustration, and he studied under instructors with connections to the Ashcan School and early American modernism.

== Career ==
Karlin began his professional career as an illustrator in the 1940s. He moved to New York City and was hired as a staff artist at Fortune magazine from 1943 to 1945. After leaving Fortune, he became a freelance contributor to many publications, including Esquire, Look, The New Republic, Sports Illustrated, Town & Country, Seventeen, Architectural Forum, and Playboy. He also designed record album covers, working with labels such as RCA Victor and Columbia Records, and produced cover art for classical, jazz, and popular albums in the 1950s and 1960s.

Karlin was an active illustrator of books and literary works. He created drawings for illustrated editions of The Rubáiyát of Omar Khayyám (1964), Plato's Symposium, and fairy tales retold by Marianne Moore. Forrest notes that Karlin typically worked directly in ink, often redrawing a scene multiple times until he achieved an ideal composition. His Rubáiyát illustrations were praised for their stylized yet classical approach, and Forrest documents Karlin's methodical process of closely reading each quatrain before rendering visual interpretations that balanced fidelity to the text with imaginative vision. He received the New York Herald Tribune Children's Book Award in 1961.

In addition to his commercial work, Karlin taught at several New York art schools, including Parsons School of Design, Pratt Institute, Cooper Union, the School of Visual Arts, and the Workshop School of Advertising and Editorial Art.

== Artistic style and themes ==
Karlin's artistic style was characterized by fine, flowing line work and a blend of realist and abstract elements. He worked in pen and ink, pencil, tempera, oil paint, pastel, and ceramics. His paintings combined careful realism with imaginative abstraction, often exploring humanistic and social themes. Critics noted his ability to shift between commercial clarity and expressive personal work, and to move from poetic scenes to commentary on age, poverty, and the human condition. Forrest emphasized Karlin's distinctive direct-ink technique and his aversion to preliminary sketching, describing his drawings as both immediate and refined.

== Exhibitions ==
Karlin's artworks were exhibited in major U.S. art institutions, including the Museum of Modern Art, the Art Institute of Chicago, the Pennsylvania Academy of the Fine Arts, the Corcoran Gallery of Art, the San Francisco Museum of Art, and the Metropolitan Museum of Art. Later in his career, he exhibited in California, including at the Laguna Art Museum. In the 1970s, he undertook a lecture tour of Japan and was featured in a special issue of the Tokyo art magazine Vision.

== Collections ==
Karlin's work is held in the permanent collections of the National Gallery of Art in Washington, D.C., the Whitney Museum of American Art (which acquired his 1948 lithograph Southern Negro Girl), the Crystal Bridges Museum of American Art which holds his Night Shift print in the Labor and Industry Print Collection.

== Legacy ==
Karlin is remembered for bridging the gap between commercial and fine art. His illustrations and paintings demonstrated technical precision and aesthetic sophistication, earning him a place in both museums and magazines. He influenced a generation of students through his teaching roles, particularly at the School of Visual Arts, which honored him during its 40th anniversary exhibition in 1988. His album covers, book illustrations, and fine art remain collectible and have been the subject of recent critical reevaluation.
