= Assistant Secretary of Defense for Acquisition =

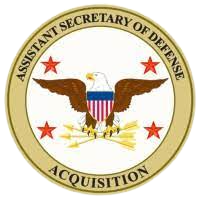
- Emblem of the assistant secretary of defense for acquisition

- Flag of an assistant secretary of defense

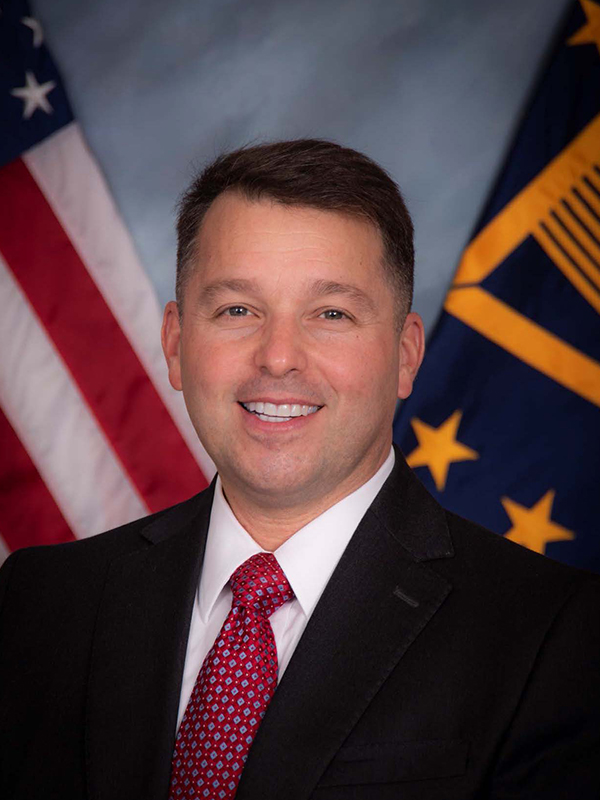
- Incumbent; James A. Ruocco (acting) since 22 January 2025
- Office of the Secretary of Defense
- Reports to: Under Secretary of Defense for Acquisition and Sustainment; Deputy Secretary of Defense; Secretary of Defense
- Appointer: The president with the advice and consent of the Senate
- Term length: No fixed term
- Formation: 1 October 2011
- Succession: 16th in SecDef succession
- Deputy: John M. Tenaglia
- Salary: Level IV of the Executive Schedule
- Website: www.acq.osd.mil/asda

The assistant secretary of defense for acquisition, or ASD (A), is one of three assistant secretaries reporting to the under secretary of defense for acquisition and sustainment. The position is the principal advisor to the under secretary of defense for acquisition and sustainment, the deputy secretary of defense, and the secretary of defense on matters relating to acquisition program management; the Department of Defense Acquisition System; and the development of strategic, space, intelligence, tactical warfare, command and control, and business systems.

== Roles and responsibilities ==
The assistant secretary of defense for acquisition's priority, is to deliver a Defense Acquisition System that is flexible, tailorable, and enables speed, and is able to deliver capability at the point of need. Currently, the office is focused on transitioning from an acquisition system that is expensive, slow, and burdensome towards one involving reduced timelines, lower costs, and improved quality.

== Organization ==
The assistant secretary of defense for acquisition has the following people reporting to them:

- Principal Deputy Assistant Secretary of Defense for Acquisition
- Deputy Assistant Secretary of Defense for Strategic, Space, and Intelligence Portfolio Management
- Deputy Assistant Secretary of Defense for Platform and Weapon Portfolio Management
- Executive Director, Acquisition Integration and Interoperability (AI2) Office
- Executive Director, Joint Rapid Acquisition Cell
- Executive Director, Joint Production Accelerator Cell
- Principal Director, Defense Pricing and Contracting
- President, Defense Acquisition University
- Director, Defense Contract Management Agency

== Officeholders ==
No.	Assistant Secretary		Term			SecDef(s) served under	President(s) served under	Ref(s)
No.	Portrait	Name	Took office	Left office	Term length	SecDef(s) served under	President(s) served under	Ref(s)
–	Katrina G. McFarland	Katrina G. McFarland; Acting	1 October 2011	24 May 2012	236 days	Leon Panetta	Barack Obama	
1	Katrina G. McFarland	Katrina G. McFarland	24 May 2012	20 January 2017	4 years, 241 days	Leon Panetta; Chuck Hagel; Ash Carter	Barack Obama	
–	Dyke D. Weatherington	Dyke D. Weatherington; Acting	20 January 2017	14 December 2017	328 days	Jim Mattis	Donald Trump	
–	James A. MacStravic	James A. MacStravic; Acting	14 December 2017	18 February 2018	66 days	Jim Mattis	Donald Trump	
2	Kevin M. Fahey	Kevin M. Fahey	18 February 2018	20 January 2021	2 years, 337 days	Jim Mattis; Mark Esper	Donald Trump	
–	Dyke D. Weatherington	Dyke D. Weatherington; Acting	20 January 2021	30 June 2021	161 days	Lloyd Austin	Joe Biden	
–	Christopher C. O'Donnell	Christopher C. O'Donnell; Acting	1 July 2021	3 March 2022	245 days	Lloyd Austin	Joe Biden	
–	Tanya M. Skeen	Tanya M. Skeen; Acting	3 March 2022	15 August 2023	1 year, 165 days	Lloyd Austin	Joe Biden	
–	Gary A. Ashworth	Gary A. Ashworth; Acting	15 August 2023	5 March 2024	203 days	Lloyd Austin	Joe Biden	
3	Cara L. Abercrombie	Cara L. Abercrombie	5 March 2024	29 May 2024	85 days	Lloyd Austin	Joe Biden	
–	Gary A. Ashworth	Gary A. Ashworth; Acting	29 May 2024	20 January 2025	236 days	Lloyd Austin	Joe Biden	-
–	Brent G. Ingraham	Brent G. Ingraham; Acting	20 January 2025	22 January 2025	2 days	Robert G. Salesses (acting)	Donald Trump	
–	James A. Ruocco	James A. Ruocco; Acting	22 January 2025		1 year, 227 days	Pete Hegseth	Donald Trump	-

=== Principal Deputy Assistant Secretary ===
No.	Principal Deputy Assistant Secretary		Term			SecDef(s) served under	President(s) served under	Ref(s)
No.	Portrait	Name	Took office	Left office	Term length	SecDef(s) served under	President(s) served under	Ref(s)
1	Stacy A. Cummings	Stacy A. Cummings	March 2019	20 January 2021	~1 year, 311 days	Mark Esper	Donald Trump	
–	Christopher C. O'Donnell	Christopher C. O'Donnell; Acting	20 January 2021	30 June 2021	161 days	Lloyd Austin	Joe Biden	
–	John M. Tenaglia	John M. Tenaglia; Acting	1 July 2021	3 March 2022	245 days	Lloyd Austin	Joe Biden	
–	Christopher C. O'Donnell	Christopher C. O'Donnell; Acting	3 March 2022	15 August 2023	1 year, 165 days	Lloyd Austin	Joe Biden	
–	John M. Tenaglia	John M. Tenaglia; Acting	15 August 2023	5 March 2024	203 days	Lloyd Austin	Joe Biden	
2	Gary A. Ashworth	Gary A. Ashworth	5 March 2024	29 May 2024	85 days	Lloyd Austin	Joe Biden	
–	John M. Tenaglia	John M. Tenaglia; Acting	29 May 2024	1 August 2025	1 year, 64 days	Lloyd Austin; Pete Hegseth	Joe Biden; Donald Trump	
–	David S. Cadman	David S. Cadman; Acting	1 August 2025	Incumbent	1 year, 36 days	Pete Hegseth	Donald Trump	
