= Claude M. Bolton Jr. =

United States Air Force general

Claude Milburn Bolton Jr.
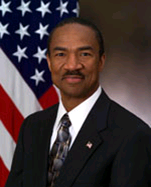
- Official portrait as United States Assistant Secretary of the Army for Acquisition, Logistics, and Technology.
- Born: 13 December 1945; Sioux City, Iowa
- Died: 28 July 2015 (aged 69); Chantilly, Virginia
- Education: University of Nebraska–Lincoln (BS); Troy State Univ (MBA)
- Spouse: Linda
- Children: Cindy, Jennifer
- Parent(s): Claude Bolton Sr. Annie Lee Bolton
- Military career
- Allegiance: United States of America
- Branch: United States Air Force
- Service years: 1969–2002
- Rank: Major general
- Unit: 497th TF Sqdn
- Commands: Def Sys Mgmt Coll; AFSAC
- Conflicts: Vietnam War
- Awards: Dist. Svc Medal; Legion of Merit

United States Assistant Secretary of the Army for Acquisition, Logistics, and Technology
- In office 2 January 2002 – 2 January 2008

Claude Milburn Bolton Jr. was a United States Air Force major general who served also as United States Assistant Secretary of the Army for Acquisition, Logistics, and Technology from 2002 to 2008.

== Early life ==
Claude M. Bolton Jr. was born in 1945 in Sioux City, Iowa. He was educated at the University of Nebraska–Lincoln, receiving a bachelor's degree in electrical engineering in 1969.

== Military career ==
While in college, he served in the Reserve Officers' Training Corps, and after college, he was commissioned as a second lieutenant in the United States Air Force in June 1969. After spending a year in undergraduate pilot training at Williams Air Force Base, he served as a fighter pilot posted at McConnell Air Force Base for the second half of 1970, at Davis–Monthan Air Force Base in early 1971, and at Ubon Royal Thai Air Force Base 1971–72. In total, during the course of the Vietnam War, Bolton logged over 2,700 hours in over 30 different aircraft; this involved 232 combat missions, 40 of which were over North Vietnam. He then spent 1972–74 as an instructor pilot over Cannon Air Force Base, ultimately logging enough hours to become a command pilot. In 1974, he attended the five-week-long Squadron Officer School at Maxwell Air Force Base. From 1974 to 1976, he was an instructor pilot at RAF Upper Heyford.

Bolton then spent all of 1977 at the U.S. Air Force Test Pilot School at Edwards Air Force Base. He was then a test pilot stationed at Eglin Air Force Base 1978–82, during which time he flew test flights for the McDonnell Douglas F-4 Phantom II, the General Dynamics F-111 Aardvark, and the General Dynamics F-16 Fighting Falcon. Also, in 1978 he completed a master's degree in management from Troy State University.

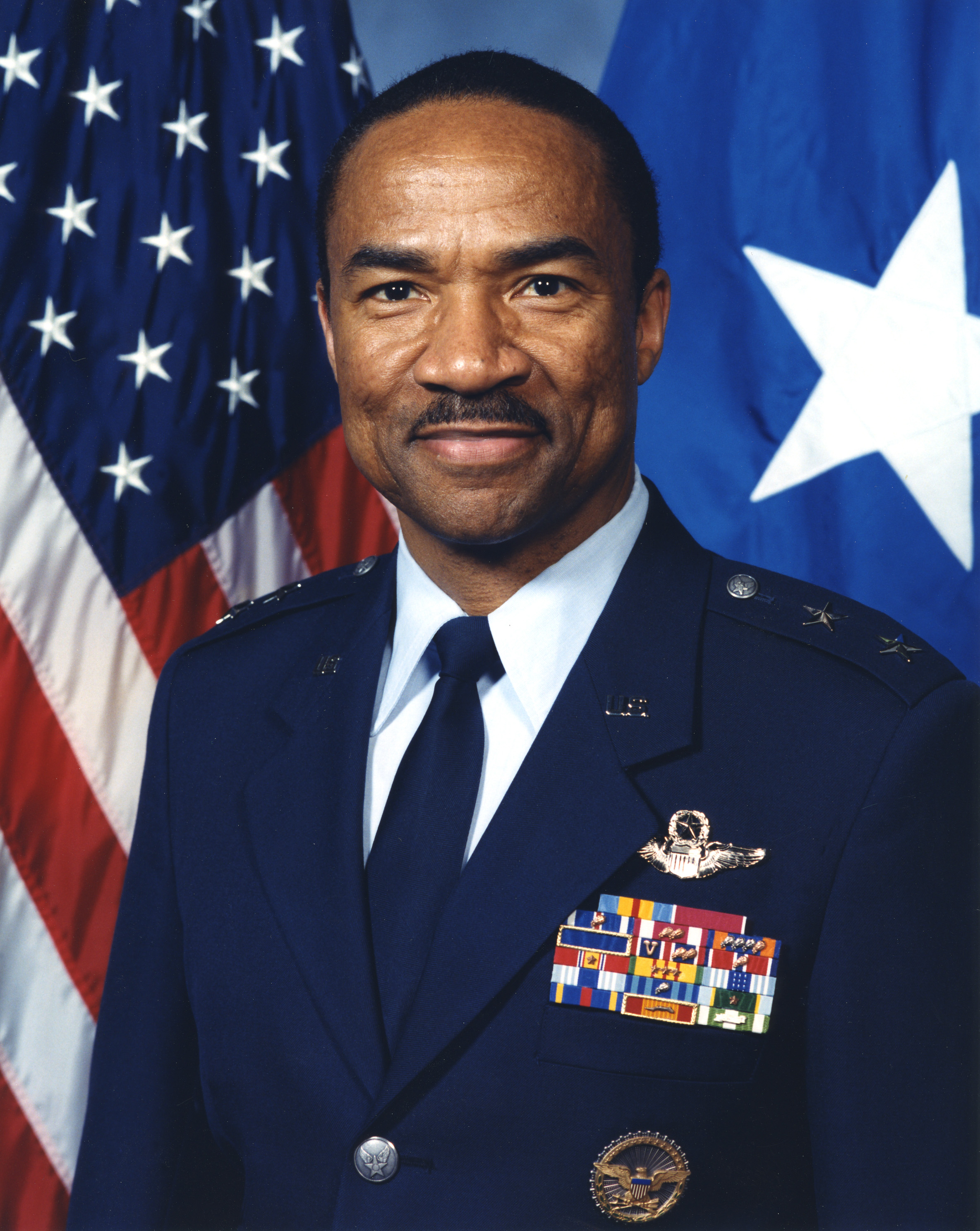
Major General Claude M. Bolton Jr. shortly before his retirement.

Bolton spent the next phase of his Air Force career in program management. In 1982, he completed correspondence courses from the Air Command and Staff College. He also attended the Defense Systems Management College of the Defense Acquisition University. From 1982 to 1985, he was posted to Wright-Patterson Air Force Base, where he was the program manager of the Lockheed Martin F-22 Raptor System Program Office. He then spent 1985–86 as a student at the Naval War College. From 1985 to 1986, he served in the Pentagon as the program element officer for the General Dynamics F-16 Fighting Falcon and as deputy division chief of the Aircraft Division, and later division chief of the Low Observables Vehicle Division in the Office of Special Programs. In 1988, Bolton returned to Wright-Patterson Air Force Base to serve as deputy program director for the Northrop Grumman B-2 Spirit Program System Office. From 1989 to 1992, he was program director of the AGM-129 ACM System Program Office at Wright-Patterson Air Force Base. Also, in 1991, he completed a master's degree in national security and strategic studies from the Naval War College. Remaining at Wright-Patterson Air Force Base, from 1992 to 1993, he was inspector general of the Air Force Materiel Command.

He was then commandant of the Defense Systems Management College at Fort Belvoir from 1993 to 1996. He spent three months as special assistant to the Assistant Secretary of the Air Force (Acquisition) in 1996, and then returned to Air Force Materiel Command as director of requirements 1996–98. From 1998 to 2000, he was Program Executive Officer for fighter and bomber programs in the Office of the Assistant Secretary of the Air Force (Acquisition). He was then commanding officer of the Air Force Security Assistance Center 2000–2002. As such, he was responsible for overseeing over $90 billion of sales of military equipment to foreign countries. He retired from the Air Force in 2002, having attained the rank of major general.

== Effective dates of promotion ==
Insignia	Rank	Date
	Major general	March 20, 1998
	Brigadier general	August 1, 1993
	Colonel	July 1, 1988
	Lieutenant colonel	March 1, 1984
	Major	May 1, 1980
	Captain	May 30, 1972
	First lieutenant	November 30, 1970
	Second lieutenant	May 31, 1969

== Civilian career ==
In 2002, while serving the commander of Air Force Security Assistance and Cooperation Command at Wright-Patterson AFB, President of the United States George W. Bush asked Bolton if he would step down from that position and accept nomination as the United States Assistant Secretary of the Army for Acquisition, Logistics, and Technology. Accepting the position required Bolton to retire from the Air Force, a decision he made after discussing with his wife and daughters, and on December 31, 2001, Bolton retired at Wright Patterson. The next day, New Years Day, Bolton and his family drove to Washington D.C. and was sworn in as the United States Assistant Secretary of the Army for Acquisition, Logistics, and Technology the next day, January 2, 2002. Bolton held the office from 2 January 2002 to 2 January 2008. The six years he spent in the position was at the height of the Operation Iraqi Freedom and Operation Enduring Freedom and was considered by many to be an unusually long period of time for such a stressful appointment. According to his wife, Linda Bolton, he stayed in the job for a long period because felt compelled to ensure that soldiers in battle were receiving the best equipment possible.

During his tenure as the Army's senior acquisition official, Bolton received an honorary doctorate from Cranfield University in 2006, and a second honorary doctorate from his alma mater, the University of Nebraska–Lincoln, in 2007.

On January 3, 2008, Bolton became executive-in-residence of the Defense Acquisition University at Fort Belvoir, where he taught DAU's executive-level Program Manager's course, a ten-week course designed for experienced acquisition practitioners who had been selected for their potential as leaders of major acquisition programs.

Bolton died unexpectedly at his home on July 28, 2015. At the time of his death he was training for the Air Force Marathon, an event he participated in annually with his two daughters.

His engagement with the [Program Manager's Course] students helped to thoroughly enrich the experience for each student he interacted with, as he contributed his knowledge and experience to the course. He will be missed, not only by the students, but also by the faculty, with whom he spent many hours over the last few years, providing assistance and valuable feedback that directly influenced the quality of instruction and the course

— Dr. Michael C. Ryan, Defense Acquisition University

Government offices
Preceded by Paul J. Hoeper; Kenneth J. Oscar (acting)	United States Assistant Secretary of the Army for Acquisition, Logistics, and Technology; 2 January 2002 – 2 January 2008	Succeeded by Dean G. Popps (acting); Malcolm Ross O'Neill
