= Jeffrey R. Riemer =

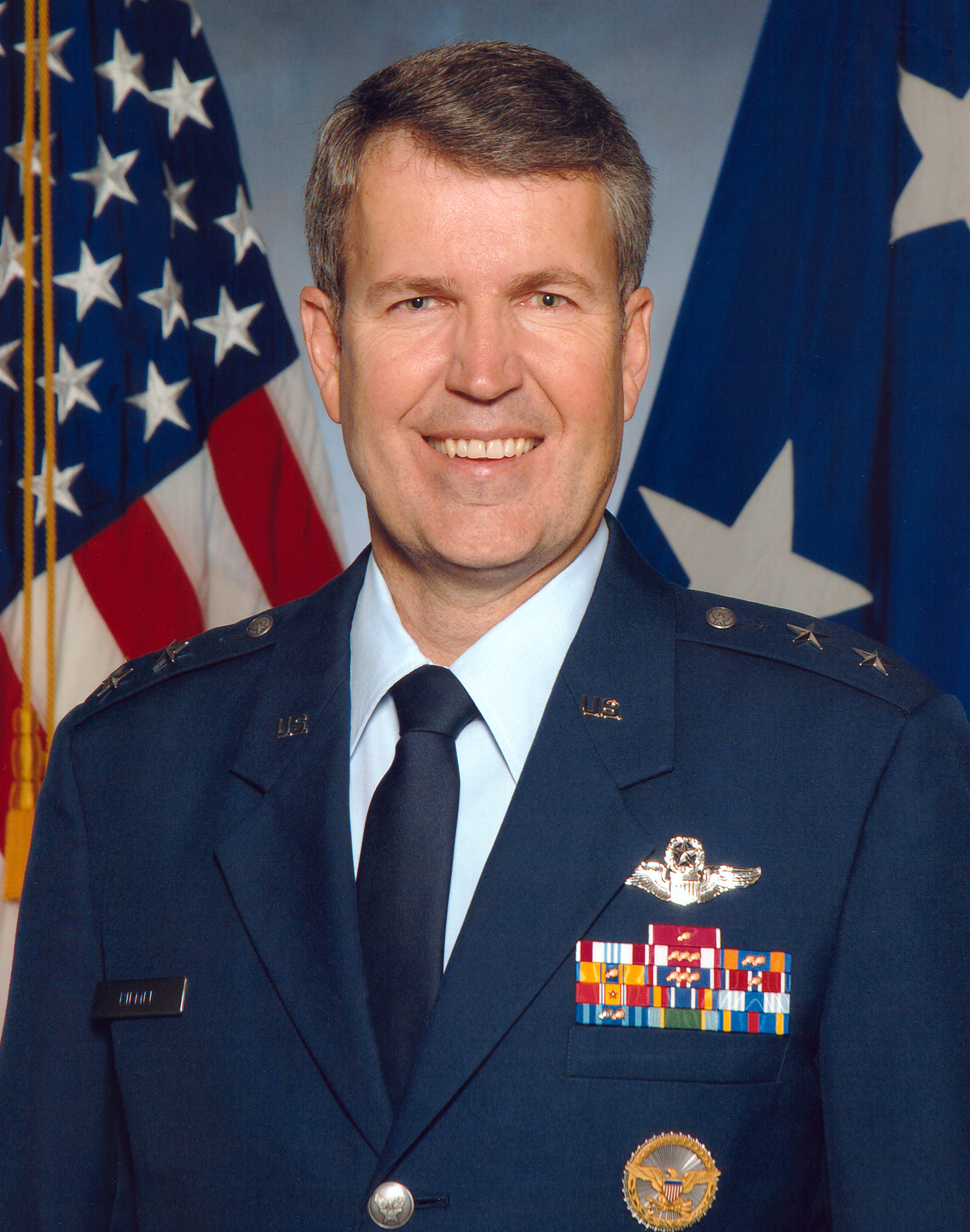
- Major General Jeffrey R. Riemer
- Born: August 26, 1951 (age 75); South Haven, Michigan, United States
- Military career
- Allegiance: United States of America
- Branch: United States Air Force
- Service years: 1974-2008
- Rank: Major General
- Commands: 4953d Test Squadron; Air Armament Center; Air Force Security Assistance Center
- Awards: Air Force Distinguished Service Medal; Legion of Merit (2); Defense Meritorious Service Medal; Meritorious Service Medal (4); Air Medal (3); Air Force Commendation Medal (2)

Major General Jeffrey R. Riemer is a retired major general in the United States Air Force. He served as the program executive officer for the F-22 Program for the United States Air Force from January 2007 to October 1, 2008. During this time he was responsible for all acquisition activities including the awarding of a $5 billion contract extension for the procurement of an additional 60 aircraft. He previously served as commander of the Air Armament Center from December 2005 to January 2007.

General Riemer joined the Air Force in 1974 after graduating from the University of Florida ROTC program. He served as an F-4 pilot in Japan before being transferred to the Air Training Command, where he became a T-37 instructor pilot and was named Instructor Pilot of the Year.

The general also worked as an F-16 test pilot at General Dynamics and the F-16 Combined Test Force and served as an instructor at the Air Force Test Pilot School. Other assignments have included serving as a military staff assistant for the testing of aircraft and air-to-air missiles in the Office of the Secretary of Defense, program manager for the MC-130H Combat Talon, program director of special programs for the Air-to-Air Joint System Program Office, and program executive officer for command and control, and combat support systems.

The general has commanded the 4953d Test Squadron, Air Force Security Assistance Center and Air Armament Center. He has over 3,000 flying hours in more than 40 different types of aircraft. He retired from the Air Force on October 1, 2008.

== Education ==
- 1974 Bachelor of Science degree in aerospace engineering, University of Florida
- 1980 Squadron Officer School, Maxwell AFB, Ala.
- 1984 Master of Science degree in aeronautical engineering, Air Force Institute of Technology
- 1986 Air Command and Staff College, by correspondence
- 1990 Program Management Course, Fort Belvoir, Va.
- 1994 Air War College, Maxwell AFB, Ala.
- 1997 Executive Program Management Course, Fort Belvoir, Va.
- 2001 National Security Decision Making II Seminar, Johns Hopkins University, Baltimore, Md.
- 2002 Driving Government Performance: Leadership Strategies that Produce Results, John F. Kennedy School of Government, Harvard University, Cambridge, Mass.
- 2003 Program for Senior Executives in National and International Security, John F. Kennedy School of Government, Harvard University
- 2003 Chairman of the Joint Chiefs of Staff Level IV Antiterrorism Executive Seminar, Washington, D.C.
- 2004 Architecture Based Systems Engineering for Senior Leaders, Armed Forces Communications and Electronics Association Educational Foundation, Fairfax, Va.
- 2005 Program for Senior Managers in Government, John F. Kennedy School of Government, Harvard University, Cambridge, Mass.
- 2008 Certificate of Process Expertise and Process Mastery, Hammer and Company, Cambridge, Mass.
- 2008 Certificate of Achievement in Lean Six Sigma Black Belt, Villanova University, Pa.

== Assignments ==
1. October 1974 – December 1975, student, undergraduate pilot training, Webb AFB, Texas
2. December 1975 – February 1976, student, lead-in fighter training, Holloman AFB, N.M.
3. February 1976 – December 1976, student, F-4 Replacement Training Unit, Luke AFB, Ariz.
4. December 1976 – August 1978, F-4C Wild Weasel pilot, 67th Tactical Fighter Squadron, Kadena Air Base, Japan
5. August 1978 – December 1978, student, T-37 pilot instructor training, Randolph AFB, Texas
6. December 1978 – March 1981, T-37 instructor pilot, Columbus Air Force Base, Miss.
7. March 1981 – June 1982, F-16 acceptance test pilot, Air Force Plant Representative Office, General Dynamics, Fort Worth, Texas
8. June 1982 – June 1983, graduate student, School of Aeronautical Engineering, Air Force Institute of Technology, Wright-Patterson AFB, Ohio
9. June 1983 – June 1984, distinguished graduate, USAF Test Pilot School, Edwards AFB, Calif.
10. June 1984 – June 1986, test pilot instructor, USAF Test Pilot School, Edwards AFB, Calif.
11. June 1986 – November 1988, experimental test pilot branch chief and operations officer, F-16 Combined Test Force, 6510th Test Wing, Edwards AFB, Calif.
12. November 1988 – August 1991, military staff assistant, Office of the Deputy Director for Defense Research and Engineering, and Test and Evaluation, Office of the Secretary of Defense, Washington, D.C.
13. August 1991 – July 1993, commander, 4953rd Test Squadron, Wright-Patterson AFB, Ohio
14. July 1993 – June 1994, student, Air War College, Maxwell AFB, Ala.
15. June 1994 – July 1995, MC-130H Combat Talon program manager, Special Operations Developmental Systems Office, Wright-Patterson AFB, Ohio
16. July 1995 – September 1996, chief, F-16 Programs Division, F-16 System Program Office, Wright-Patterson AFB, Ohio
17. September 1996 – February 1998, program director of special programs, Air-to-Air Joint SPO, Eglin AFB, Fla.
18. February 1998 – June 2000, system program director, F-16 SPO, Wright-Patterson AFB, Ohio
19. June 2000 – December 2000, program executive officer, Command and Control Programs, Headquarters U.S. Air Force, Washington, D.C.
20. January 2001 – February 2002, program executive officer for command and control, and combat support systems, Headquarters U.S. Air Force, Washington, D.C.
21. February 2002 – July 2004, commander, Air Force Security Assistance Center, Headquarters Air Force Materiel Command, Wright-Patterson AFB, Ohio
22. July 2004 – December 2005, director of operations, Headquarters AFMC, Wright-Patterson AFB, Ohio
23. December 2005 – January 2007, commander, Air Armament Center, and Air Force Program Executive Officer for Weapons, AFMC, Eglin AFB, Fla.
24. January 2007 – September 2008, Air Force program executive officer for the F-22 Program, Office of the Assistant Secretary of the Air Force for Acquisition, Headquarters U.S. Air Force, Washington, D.C.

== Flight information ==
- Rating: Command pilot and test pilot
- Flight hours: 3,000
- Aircraft flown: F-4, F-16, A-37, T-37, A-10, T-38, U-6, NT-39, N/C-141, and X-29

== Major awards and decorations ==
Air Force Distinguished Service Medal
Legion of Merit with oak leaf cluster
Defense Meritorious Service Medal
Meritorious Service Medal with three oak leaf cluster
Air Medal with two oak leaf cluster
Air Force Commendation Medal with oak leaf cluster

== Promotion dates ==
Rank	Date
Second Lieutenant	October 26, 1974
First Lieutenant	October 26, 1976
Captain	October 26, 1978
Major	March 1, 1986
Lieutenant Colonel	April 1, 1990
Colonel	June 1, 1996
Brigadier General	December 1, 2001
Major General	October 1, 2005
