= Heidi Shyu =

Taiwanese-American engineer and government official

- 徐若冰
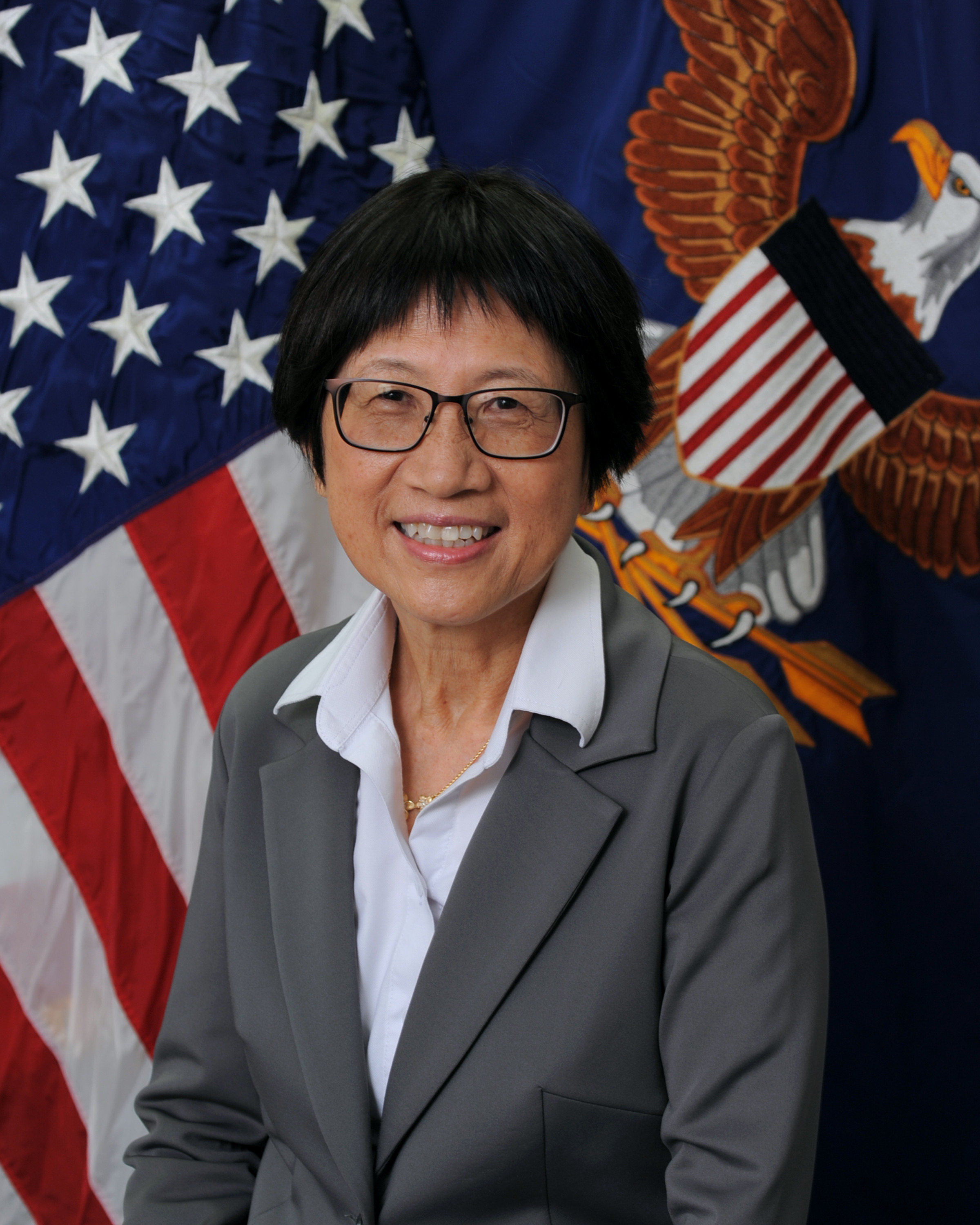

Under Secretary of Defense for Research and Engineering
- In office July 25, 2021 – January 20, 2025
- President: Joe Biden
- Preceded by: Michael D. Griffin
- Succeeded by: Emil Michael

United States Assistant Secretary of the Army for Acquisition, Logistics, and Technology
- In office June 4, 2011 – January 30, 2016
- President: Barack Obama
- Preceded by: Malcolm Ross O'Neill
- Succeeded by: Katrina G. McFarland

Personal details
- Born: September 28, 1953 (age 73) Taipei, Taiwan
- Education: University of New Brunswick (BSc); University of Toronto (MS); University of California, Los Angeles (MS, MEngr)

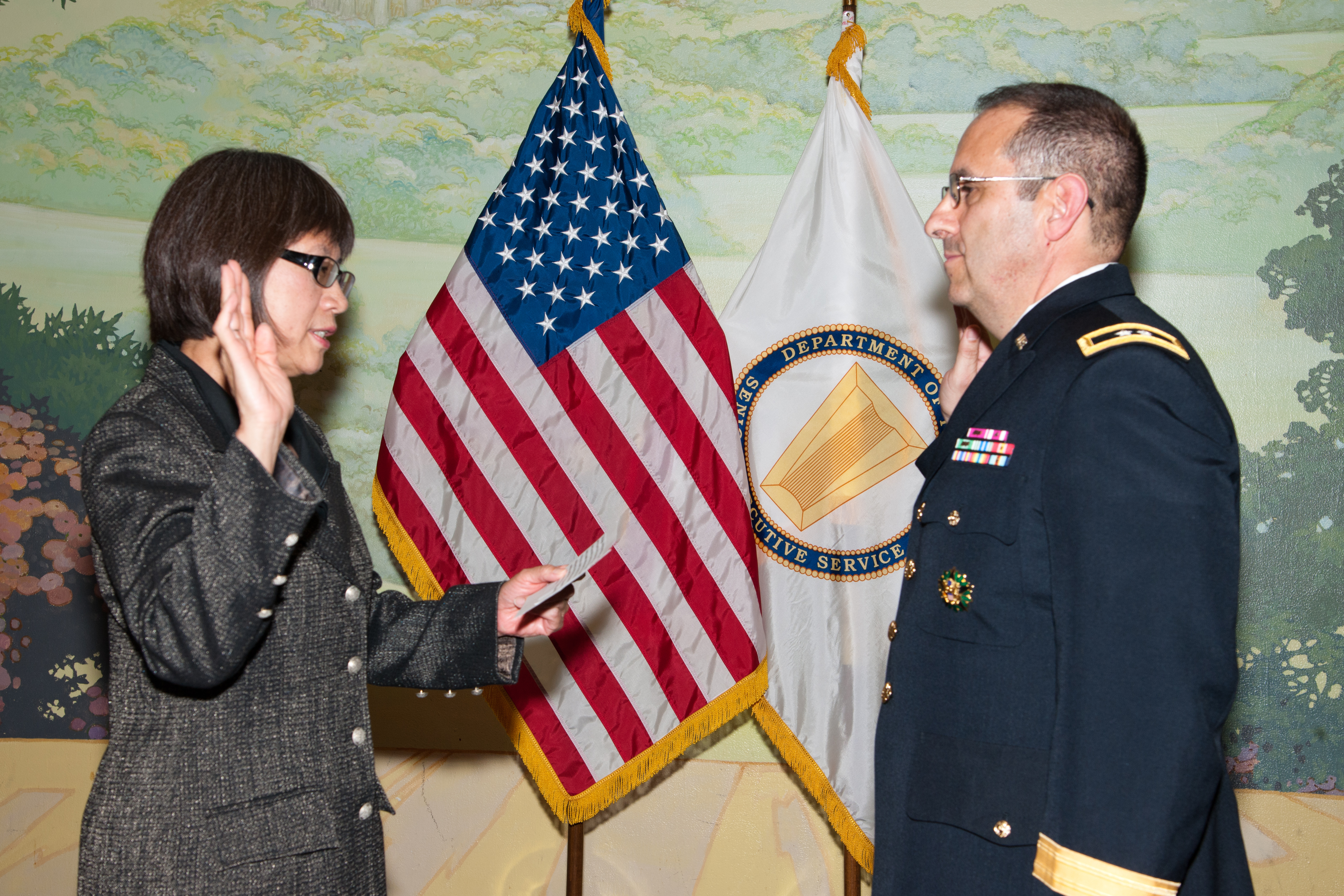
Shyu swears in Maj. Gen. Harold J. Greene on August 30, 2012

Heidi Shyu (Chinese: 徐若冰; Xú Ruòbīng; born September 28, 1953) is a Taiwanese-born American engineer who had served as the Under Secretary of Defense for Research and Engineering in the Biden administration. She previously served as the United States Assistant Secretary of the Army for Acquisition, Logistics, and Technology ASA(ALT) from 2012 to January 30, 2016.

In 2019, Shyu was elected as a member of the National Academy of Engineering for the development of innovative radar/electrooptics/infrared systems in support of the US Army and Air Force.

== Biography ==
Shyu's grandfather, Xu Kangliang, was born in Zhejiang, China. He was a warplane pilot who took part in many air battles during the Second Sino-Japanese War and later was promoted to the post of Deputy Commander of Republic of China Air Force. Her father, Xu Naili was a historian born in Hangzhou, China. Her entire family emigrated to Taiwan following the KMT defeat in the Chinese Civil War.

Shyu received a Bachelor of Science in mathematics from the University of New Brunswick, a Master of Science in mathematics from the University of Toronto, and a Master of Science in electrical engineering from the University of California, Los Angeles. She also received an engineer's degree from the University of California, Los Angeles.

== Career ==
She began her career as an engineer at Hughes Aircraft. She later moved on to Grumman and Litton Industries.

She then spent a large part of her career at Raytheon. There she held the positions of Laboratory Manager for Electromagnetic Systems; Director of JSF Antenna Technologies; Director of JSF Integrated Radar/Electronic Warfare Sensors; Senior Director of Joint Strike Fighter; Senior Director of Unmanned Combat Vehicles; Vice President of Unmanned and Reconnaissance Systems; Vice President and Technical Director of Space and Airborne Systems; Corporate Vice President of Technology and Research; and finally Vice President of Technology Strategy for Raytheon Company's Space and Airborne Systems.

She was a member of the United States Air Force Scientific Advisory Board from 2000 to 2010, serving as its vice-chairman from 2003 to 2005 and as its chairman from 2005 to 2008.

=== Obama administration ===
President Barack Obama nominated her to be an Assistant Secretary of the Army for Acquisition, Logistics, and Technology in the US Defense Department in February 2012. The Senate Armed Services Committee held hearings on Shyu's nomination on March 29, 2012. The committee favorably reported her nomination to the entire Senate on May 15, 2012. Shyu was confirmed by the entire Senate on September 22, 2012, via voice vote. Shyu held the role until the January 30, 2016.

=== Biden administration ===
On April 27, 2021, President Joe Biden nominated Shyu to be the next Under Secretary of Defense for Research and Engineering. Hearings on her nomination were held before the Senate's Armed Services Committee on May 25, 2021. The committee favorably reported her nomination to the Senate floor on June 10, 2021. Shyu was officially confirmed by the Senate on July 22, 2021, via voice vote. She started her assignment on July 25, 2021.
