= Percy Dovetonsils =

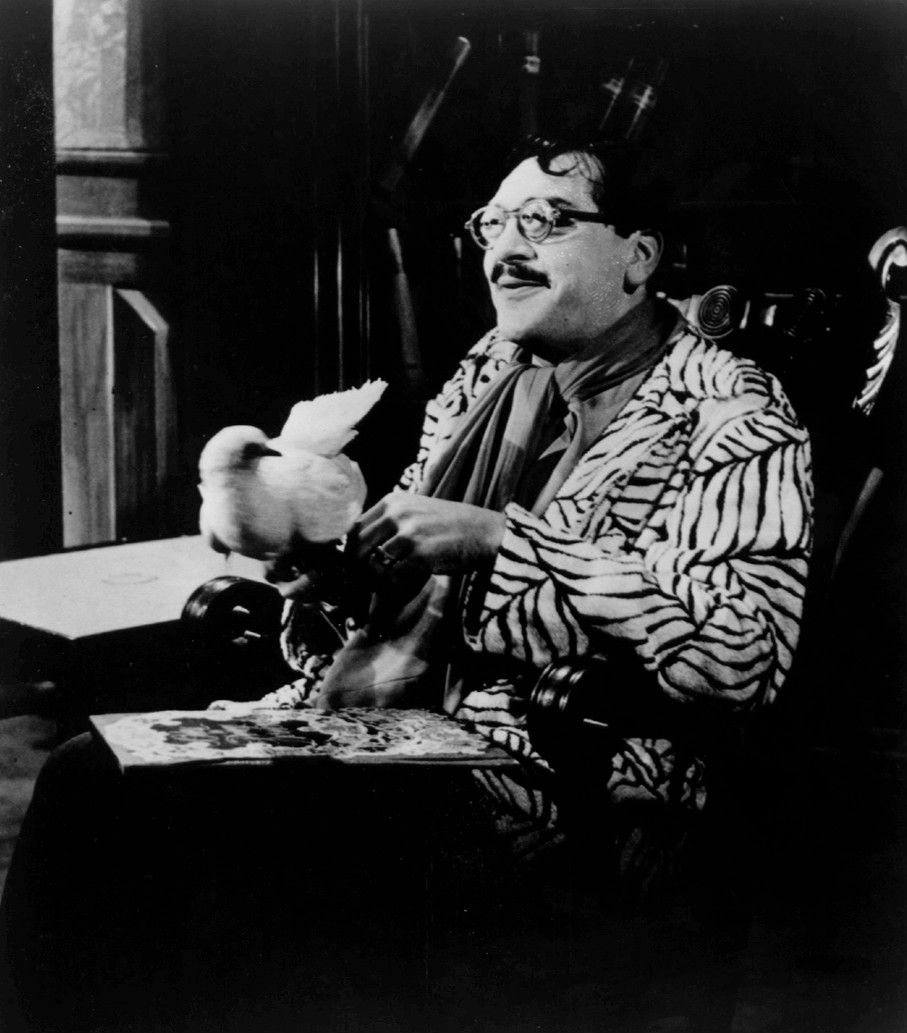
- Portrayed by: Ernie Kovacs

In-universe information
- Gender: Male
- Occupation: Poet Laureate
- Family: Bruce
- Relatives: Mother

Percy's glasses

Percy Dovetonsils is a fictional character created and played by American television comedian Ernie Kovacs. It is probably the best remembered of Kovacs' many TV incarnations.

== Creation ==
Kovacs created the character in 1950 for his program Three to Get Ready on WPTZ in Philadelphia (the station that is now KYW-TV). The prop glasses he used were discovered by his associate Andy McKay at a novelty store for ten cents; Kovacs drew lines on the eyeballs of the glasses to give Percy a "half-awake" appearance. Kovacs was said to be inspired by the TV poetry readings of Ted Malone. (Malone's program was called Between the Bookends); Percy's sign-off was, "I'll see you just outside the bookends." Others have attributed Percy's persona to Alexander Woollcott.

== Format ==
Percy was always introduced with a sweeping flourish of harp music as a "poet laureate" who appeared onscreen as a bizarrely effeminate "artiste" with weirdly slicked hair (including two carefully placed spit-curls on his forehead) and extraordinarily thick eyeglasses that appeared to have eyes painted on the backsides of the lenses. He would appear seated in a chair wearing a zebra-patterned smoking jacket, and reading from an oversize book lying open in his lap. Percy would address the audience in a syrupy lisp and read his poems out of the book while sipping from a martini glass (which often had a daisy for a swizzle stick) and/or smoking through a long cigarette holder.

The poems themselves were corny or silly, with titles like "Leslie the Mean Animal Trainer" and "Ode to a Housefly (Philosophical Ruminations on a Beastie in the Booze)." While clever, the real humor of the poems lay in the delivery, Percy's appearance and mannerisms, and his obvious self-satisfaction with his creations (as evidenced by a pursed-lip smile and a quiver of the head at the end of significant stanzas).

Occasionally, Percy would display talents other than his poetry; he is seen playing Beethoven's Moonlight Sonata on a grand piano-even after the piano itself disappears from view, and as a "Master Detective" in the US Steel "Private Eye, Private Eye" special of March 8, 1961, seen on CBS. The television special was a series of skits spoofing the portrayal of private investigators on television and in films. In "The Good Old Days", Kovacs as Percy tries tracking down a killer for the victim's widow, played by Edie Adams. Percy also put in a guest appearance on The Perry Como Show in February, 1957.

== Character ==
The character has characteristics of the stereotype of homosexuals common in the 1950s and early 1960s. In one segment, he looks up abruptly from his book and says "That cameraman has the motht muthcular legth..." It was probably a Kovacs ad-lib, if one can judge from the off-camera laughter and the momentary shaking of the camera. In one of his poems, about a cowboy, one of the lines was "Are you really a gay ranchero?" The term "gay" in that sense was not often heard on television at that time.

Percy would sometimes talk to the off-camera crew (who were frequently heard laughing at Kovacs' ad-libs), or to his unseen "friend," Bruce. The lisping of both names helped reinforce the supposedly effeminate nature of those two names, a fact which George Carlin would later sometimes reference when discussing gay issues.

According to Joe Mikolas, a friend of Kovacs who also worked with him on his television shows, Kovacs had plans to make Percy Dovetonsils a more three-dimensional character, but died in an auto accident before he could start writing new material. Kovacs' own description of his character was, "He's a beautiful soul who hasn't quite made it over the line into this rude, virile world."

== Records ==
In 1961, Kovacs recorded an album of Percy reading his poetry for Vanguard Records; the album was titled, Percy Dovetonsils... Thpeaks, but it was not released until 2012. Kovacs planned to release the album, but was not able to do so because of conflicts with other labels he recorded for. When the masters were given to Kovacs, he donated them to a Los Angeles area hospital. His wife, Edie Adams, was able to acquire them again in 1967; they remained part of her non-public collection of her husband's work until her death in 2008. When found, the tape was mislabeled as film and had no music background; it was only audio of Kovacs as Percy reading his poetry.
