= Byron Wien =

American investor (1933–2023)

- Born: Byron Richard Wien; February 14, 1933; Chicago, Illinois, U.S.
- Died: October 25, 2023 (aged 90); Southampton, New York, U.S.
- Education: Harvard University (BA, MBA)
- Occupations: Investor; writer
- Spouse: Anita Volz (m. 1978)

Byron Richard Wien (/wiːn/; February 14, 1933 – October 25, 2023) was an American investor. After a long career as an executive at Morgan Stanley, he became vice chairman of Blackstone Advisory Partners, a subsidiary of The Blackstone Group. He was regarded as one of Wall Street's most prominent market strategists.

Wien's memoir, which he co-authored with former Blackstone colleague Taylor Becker, was published posthumously on November 12, 2024.

== Background ==
Byron Richard Wien was born in Chicago on February 14, 1933, to Max Wien and Anne (Lurie) Wien. Both of his parents had died by the time he was 14 years old, and he was thereafter raised by his maternal aunt Rose. He was a 1950 graduate of Senn High School in the Edgewater neighborhood on the North Side of Chicago. He received an AB with honors from Harvard College in 1954, where he was on the staff of The Harvard Crimson. Two years later, he graduated with an MBA from Harvard Business School.

== Career ==
Byron Wien began his investment career in 1965 as a security analyst at the money-management firm Brokaw, Schaenen, and Clancy, which subsequently merged with Weiss, Peck & Greer. He later transitioned roles from security analyst to portfolio manager, and eventually took a position with Century Capital Associates in early 1983.

He joined Morgan Stanley in 1985 and became managing director later that year. He spent 20 years at Morgan Stanley, finally ascending to the role of Chief U.S. Investment Strategist. During this time, he wrote weekly investment reports, and was considered among the most widely read investment writers. Wien joined hedge fund Pequot Capital Management in 2005 until the firm's closing in 2009. He joined The Blackstone Group as vice chairman in 2009.

He produced an annual "Ten Surprises" list which was widely distributed on Wall Street. He also regularly appeared in the financial press, making television appearances and providing quotes for news stories. In 1995, Wien co-authored a book with George Soros on the legendary investor's life and philosophy, Soros on Soros – Staying Ahead of the Curve.

First Call named Wien the most-read analyst of 1988, while Smart Money magazine honored him as Wall Street's top strategist in 1990. He was named to the 2004 SmartMoney Power 30 list of Wall Street's most influential investors, thinkers, enforcers, policy makers, players and market movers. He appeared in the “Thinker” category.

In 2006, Wien was named by New York Magazine as one of the sixteen most influential people in Wall Street. The New York Society of Security Analysts (NYSSA) presented him with a lifetime achievement award in 2008.

He was on the Investment Advisory Committee of The Open Society Foundation, and a member of the Investment Committees of Lincoln Center and The Pritzker Foundation. He was a trustee of the New York Historical Society and Chairman of the Investment Committee of the JPB Foundation.

== Personal life and death ==
Wien married Lois Rosenthal in 1960. After that marriage ended in divorce, Wien married economic consultant Anita Volz in 1978. The couple divided their time between Manhattan and Wainscott, New York.

Wien died in Southampton, New York, on October 25, 2023, at the age of 90.
