= Katrina G. McFarland =

American engineer

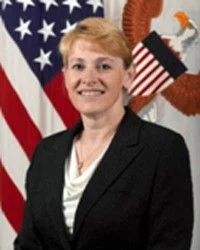

1st Assistant Secretary of Defense for Acquisition
- In office October 1, 2011 – January 20, 2017
- President: Barack Obama
- Preceded by: Position established
- Succeeded by: Kevin M. Fahey

5th United States Assistant Secretary of the Army for Acquisition, Logistics, and Technology
- In office February 1, 2016 – November 1, 2016
- President: Barack Obama
- Preceded by: Heidi Shyu
- Succeeded by: Bruce D. Jette

President of the Defense Acquisition University
- In office November 2010 – May 2012

Personal details
- Education: Queen's University at Kingston; Cranfield University

Katharina G. McFarland is an engineer who served as the first U.S. assistant secretary of defense for acquisition from 2012 to 2017 and as the fifth assistant secretary of the Army for acquisition, logistics, and technology in 2016. She was president of the Defense Acquisition University from 2010 to 2012.

== Early life and education ==
McFarland earned a B.S. in materials, mechanical, electronics, and civil engineering from Queen's University at Kingston. She has an honorary Doctorate of Engineering from the University of Cranfield (UK). McFarland has a professional engineer license and Project Management Professional certification as well as being DAWIA Level-III-certified in program management.

== Career ==
In 1986, McFarland became a general engineer at the Headquarters Marine Corps. In 1990 she became the role of Procurement Head of Electronics at the Department of National Defense (DND) in Ottawa, Canada and in 1992, she returned to the Marine Corps where she remained until February 2005 when she concluded her role as Director of Battle Management and Air Defense Systems (BMADS). She was the director of the Missile Defense Agency from 2006 to 2010. She served as president of the Defense Acquisition University from November 2010 to May 2012. On October 1, 2011, she began acting as the first assistant secretary of defense for acquisition. She was sworn in on May 24, 2012, and was succeeded by acting assistant secretary Dyke D. Weatherington on January 20, 2017. During her tenure, she served as the fifth assistant secretary of the Army for acquisition, logistics, and technology and as the Army acquisition executive from February 1, 2016, to November 1, 2016. From 2017 to 2019, she was director of Engility. From 2018 to 2021, McFarland was a member of the National Security Commission on Artificial Intelligence (NSCAI).

She is president of Blue Oryx Inc.

== Awards ==
- Presidential Meritorious Executive Rank Award (2011)
- Secretary of Defense Meritorious Civilian Service Award
- Navy Meritorious Civilian Service Award
