= Dr. Sixgun =

American Western radio drama

- Genre: Western
- Running time: 30 minutes
- Country of origin: United States
- Language: English
- Starring: Karl Weber; Bill Griffs
- Original release: September 2, 1954 – October 13, 1955

Dr. Sixgun is an American Western radio drama that aired on NBC from September 2, 1954 to October 13, 1955.

== Plot summary ==
Dr. Ray Matson, (Karl Weber) is a frontier physician based in a small western town in the 1870s called Frenchman's Ford. The stories are told by a recurring character named Pablo (Bill Griffis), a gypsy peddler who has a talking raven named Midnight as his sidekick. As his name implied, Matson was equally at home with using a gun or using his medical skills to solve problems.

== Broadcast history ==
Dr. Sixgun was broadcast September 2, 1954 – October 13, 1955, on NBC. The 30-minute sustaining series aired Thursdays at 8:30 pm, September 2–October 21, 1954; Sundays at 8 pm, October 10, 1954 – April 21, 1955; and Thursdays at 8 pm, August 18–October 13, 1955.

== Preservation status ==
More than 25 episodes are known to survive in radio collections.
