= Ted Malone =

American radio personality

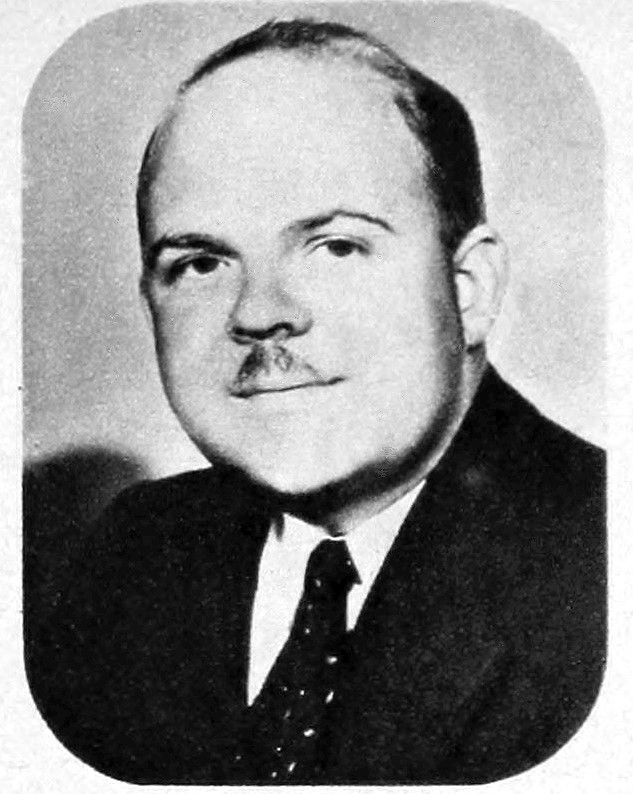
- Malone in 1947
- Born: Frank Alden Russell; May 18, 1908; Colorado Springs, Colorado
- Died: October 20, 1989 (aged 81)
- Education: William Jewell College
- Occupation: Radio host

Ted Malone (May 18, 1908 - October 20, 1989) (born Frank Alden Russell, the son of a grocer), was an American radio broadcaster.

== Childhood ==
Malone was born in Colorado Springs, Colorado, the son of Frank Arthur Russell and Grace Aurora Gunter Russell. His father was a minister. He became interested in oral performance when he attended high school in Missouri. He was also a debater in college, and graduated from William Jewell College in 1928.

== Career ==
Malone had a career in radio as a storyteller and reader of poetry. Malone's broadcasting style was that of a friendly neighbor dropping by to chat.

He was one of the few broadcast interpretationists recorded in the history of radio. Malone had a career in radio for more than forty years.

Malone began work as an announcer & ukulele soloist at KMBC, Kansas City, Missouri, in 1929. He acquired his pseudonym, Ted Malone, when asked to fill in for a program by reading poetry. Malone was asked to fill time by reading poetry when scheduled performers did not show up on time. Too embarrassed to use his own name, another announcer introduced him as Ted Malone. The positive audience response to his reading led to his radio program "Between the Bookends". Because he felt that "poetry was sissy stuff," he agreed to do the poetry program only under a pseudonym. Malone once said of his approach to Between the Bookends: "I never prepare a program. I just get before a microphone and talk and talk and talk. What about? Oh, just small talk on anything that occurs to me."

Malone's Between the Bookends program was broadcast on the CBS radio network beginning in 1935 and was presented two to five times a week for thirty years. During its first year of broadcast, Newsweek reported that the program had received more fan mail than any other network sustaining program. Malone actively sought poetry contributions from his listeners. He published the works in a regular anthology, Ted Malone's Scrapbook. Malone also published a regular "Between the Bookends" column in Radio Mirror, where readers were invited to submit their own poetry for cash prizes and had a similar arrangement with Good Housekeeping, where he was the poetry editor between 1940 and 1944. Malone was popular enough to be called "The Voice of Poetry" by the Library of Congress; when the "Between the Bookends" radio show was in danger of cancellation, the fans of the program were able to convince the network to keep the show on the air.

His organist in the early days of that program was Hugh Studebaker. Andy McKay, an associate of Ernie Kovacs said that the program inspired Kovacs to create his character, Percy Dovetonsils. As his popularity increased, Malone began writing for other programs, and soon became production manager, production director, and program director at his radio station.

During World War II, Malone began to do other types of broadcasts, such as variety shows and quiz shows, and went overseas to broadcast as a war correspondent, providing human interest soldier stories for his listeners. By 1957, Malone had established his own company, "Ted Malone Productions". The firm offered production and consultation for radio, television and the film industry. Malone partially retired in the 1970s.

== Recognition ==
Malone has a star at 1628 Vine Street in the Radio section of the Hollywood Walk of Fame. It was dedicated February 8, 1960.

== Death ==
Malone died in 1989 spending more than 60 years in broadcasting and its development.

== Legacy ==
The University of Missouri–Kansas City is home to the Ted Malone Collection, which includes more than 4,000 scripts from radio programs, more than 20,000 poems, more than 450 photographs and other items related to Malone's career.

== Works ==
His works include:

- The American album of poetry, (January 1, 1938)
- A Listener's Aid to Pilgrimage of Poetry: Ted Malone's Album of Poetic Shrines (NBC) by Ted Malone (January 1, 1939)
- Ted Malone's Mansions of imagination album: A listener's aid to "American pilgrimage" (1940)
- Ted Malone's Scrapbook: Favorite Selections From Between the Bookends (1941)
- American pilgrimage, (January 1, 1942)
- Between the Bookends with Ted Malone Volume Five (Hardcover - 1942)
- Pack up your troubles: A collection of verse (January 1, 1942)
- Yankee doodles: A book of American verse, (January 1, 1943)
- The Pocket Book of Popular Verse (1945)
- Ted Malone's Adventures in Poetry (1946)
- The All-American book of verse;: Yankee doodles (January 1, 1948)
- Ted Malone's Favorite Stories (1950)
