= Malcolm Ross O'Neill =

United States Army general

Dr. Malcolm Ross O'Neill
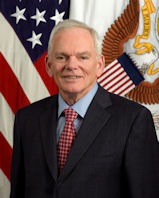

United States Assistant Secretary of the Army for Acquisition, Logistics, and Technology
- In office March 4, 2010 – June 3, 2011
- President: Barack Obama
- Preceded by: Claude M. Bolton Jr.

4th Director of the Ballistic Missile Defense Organization
- In office November 22, 1993 – August 1, 1996
- President: Bill Clinton
- Preceded by: Henry F. Cooper
- Succeeded by: Lester L. Lyles

Personal details
- Born: March 25, 1940 (age 86) Chicago, Illinois
- Education: Depaul University (BS); Rice University (MA, PhD)

Military service
- Allegiance: United States
- Branch/service: United States Army
- Years of service: 1962–1993
- Rank: Lieutenant General

Malcolm Ross O'Neill (born March 25, 1940) was the United States Assistant Secretary of the Army for Acquisition, Logistics, and Technology, having been sworn into office by United States Under Secretary of the Army Joseph W. Westphal on March 10, 2010, and resigned June 3, 2011.

== Biography ==
Malcolm Ross O'Neill was born in Chicago in 1940, where he graduated from Senn High School in 1958. He was educated at DePaul University, receiving a B.Sc. in Physics. In 1962, he joined the United States Army and was commissioned as a Field Artillery Officer. Following postings to Fort Sill, Fort Benning, Fort Bragg, Redstone Arsenal, and the Defense Language Institute at the Presidio of Monterey, O'Neill began his first tour of duty during the Vietnam War beginning in January 1965. There, he was posted at the Military Assistance Command, Vietnam. He spent 1966-67 as an instructor, and then aide-de-camp at Redstone Arsenal. In 1967-68, O'Neill was a student at the United States Army Ordnance Center and School at Aberdeen Proving Ground. He then spent 1968-70 completing a master's degree in Physics at Rice University. He returned to Vietnam in June 1970, serving as Assistant Chief of Staff of the United States Army Support Command until June 1971. He then spent 1971-72 at the United States Army Command and General Staff College, and then returned to Rice University, completing his Ph.D. in Physics in August 1974.

From 1974 to 1976, he was posted to the United States Army Missile Command at Redstone Arsenal. He then spent 1977 to 1980 at DARPA. After studying at the United States Army War College 1980-81, he spent 1981-83 in Munich as Deputy Program Manager of the NATO Patriot Management Office. He then spent the second half of 1983 as Chief of Staff of the United States Army Missile Command at Redstone Arsenal. In 1984, he was project manager for the Multiple Launch Rocket System, posted at Redstone Arsenal. He spent 1985-87 as Director for Kinetic Energy Weapons in the Office of the Secretary of Defense.

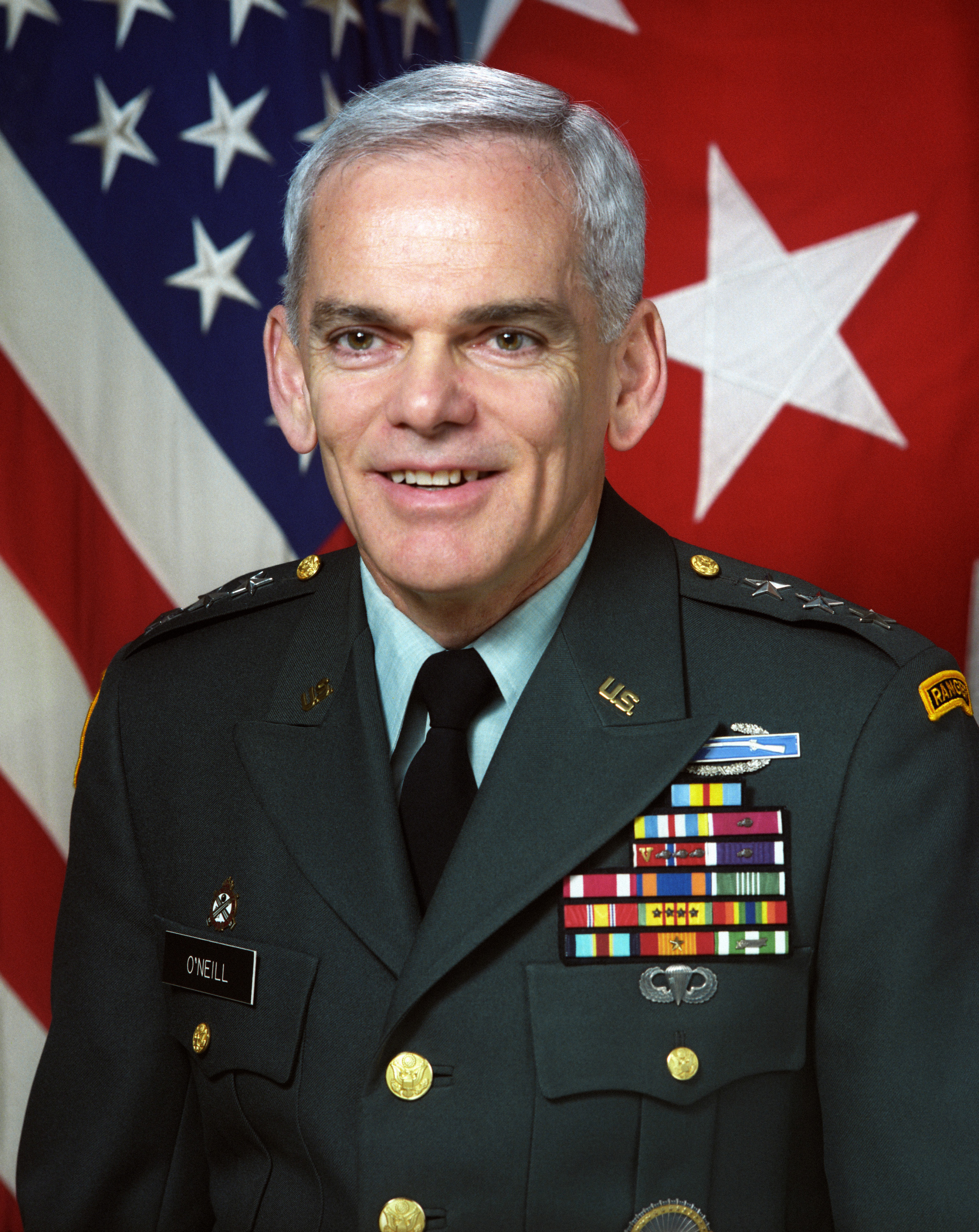
Lt. Gen. O'Neill in 1993

From 1987 to 1989, O'Neill was commanding general of the United States Army Laboratory Command in Adelphi, Maryland. He worked in the Office of the Assistant Secretary of the Army (Research, Development and Acquisition) 1989-90, and was Deputy Director, then Acting Director, of the Strategic Defense Initiative Organization 1990-93. From 1993 to 1996, he was Director of the Ballistic Missile Defense Organization. O'Neill retired from the Army in 1996, having achieved the rank of Lieutenant General.

In 1996, O'Neill joined Lockheed Martin as Vice President for Operations and Best Practices in the Space and Strategic Missiles Division. In 2000, he became Lockheed Martin's Chief Technical Officer, a position he held until 2006. He left Lockheed Martin in 2006, becoming Chairman of the United States National Academies's Board on Army Science and Technology.

President of the United States Barack Obama nominated O'Neill to be United States Assistant Secretary of the Army for Acquisition, Logistics, and Technology in 2010, and O'Neill was sworn into office by United States Under Secretary of the Army Joseph W. Westphal on March 10, 2010, and resigned effective June 3, 2011.

== Honors and awards ==
- Ronald Reagan Award, US Department of Defense, Missile Defense Agency (2012)
- Member of the National Academy of Engineering (2008) ("For exceptional leadership and innovative management of national missile-defense programs and other high-profile military-technology capabilities.")
- Honorary Fellow of AIAA (2007)
- Fellow of AIAA (2003)
- Defense Distinguished Service Medal
- Army Distinguished Service Medal
- Defense Superior Service Medal
- Legion of Merit (4)
- Bronze Star Medal (4)
- Purple Heart (2)
- Meritorious Service Medal
- Air Medal

== Dates of O'Neill's Promotions ==
| Rank | Date of Promotion |
|---|---|
| Second Lieutenant | June 6, 1962 |
| First Lieutenant | December 6, 1963 |
| Captain | November 23, 1965 |
| Major | September 30, 1968 |
| Lieutenant Colonel | July 4, 1977 |
| Colonel | July 10, 1981 |
| Brigadier General | July 1, 1987 |
| Major General | July 1, 1990 |
| Lieutenant General | December 1, 1993 |

Government offices
| Preceded by Claude M. Bolton, Jr. Dean G. Popps (acting) | United States Assistant Secretary of the Army for Acquisition, Logistics, and Technology; March 10, 2010 – June 3, 2011 | Succeeded by Heidi Shyu |
