= Marjorie Hannan =

American actress

Marjorie Hannan (born 1911 or 1912) was an American actress.

== Early years ==
Hannan was born in Hamilton, Ohio, and she majored in physical education at the University of Cincinnati (UC). While she attended UC, she also studied at the Schuster-Martin School of Dramatic Art. In July 1930 she was chosen from applicants recommended by six schools of the arts in the Cincinnati area to be the first guest student at Cincinnati's Three Arts Club, with her residence there beginning in September 1930. Hannan, who graduated from the drama school in 1931, was a tap dancer who was featured in the school's 1931 senior dance recital. She was also an Albertina Rasch dancer. She taught at Mother of Mercy High School in Cincinnati but found that her interests lay more in drama.

== Career ==
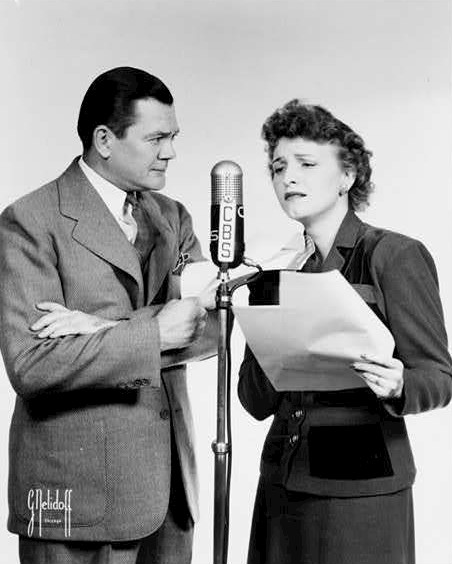
Hugh Studebaker and Hannan in Bachelor's Children

Hannan left teaching to seek work on stage in New York. After six months there with no success she returned to Cincinnati, where she became an actress on radio station WLW.

Hannan's performance in a 1930 radio adaptation of A Christmas Carol led to advances in her career. A production manager, attracted by her ability and her voice, "arranged the commercial audition that started her on the road up." On network radio, Hannah portrayed Ruth Ann on Bachelor's Children and Fay on Ma Perkins. Other radio programs on which Hannan performed included Sally of the Talkies and The Mysterious Doctor Mikalin.

Hannan retired from radio in the mid-1940s, a move that led to the death of the character that she had portrayed on Bachelor's Children for more than 10 years. Bess Flynn, the program's author, wrote that "a very fine actress" was hired to take over the role, but "she was not Ruth Ann!" Flynn added, "To me, Ruth Ann died with Miss Hannan's leaving the show" and the stories would continue to be convincing only if the character died."

== Personal life ==
Hannan was married to radio executive Myron Reck, and they had a son.
