= Gary A. Ashworth =

American retired Lieutenant Colonel

Gary Ashworth
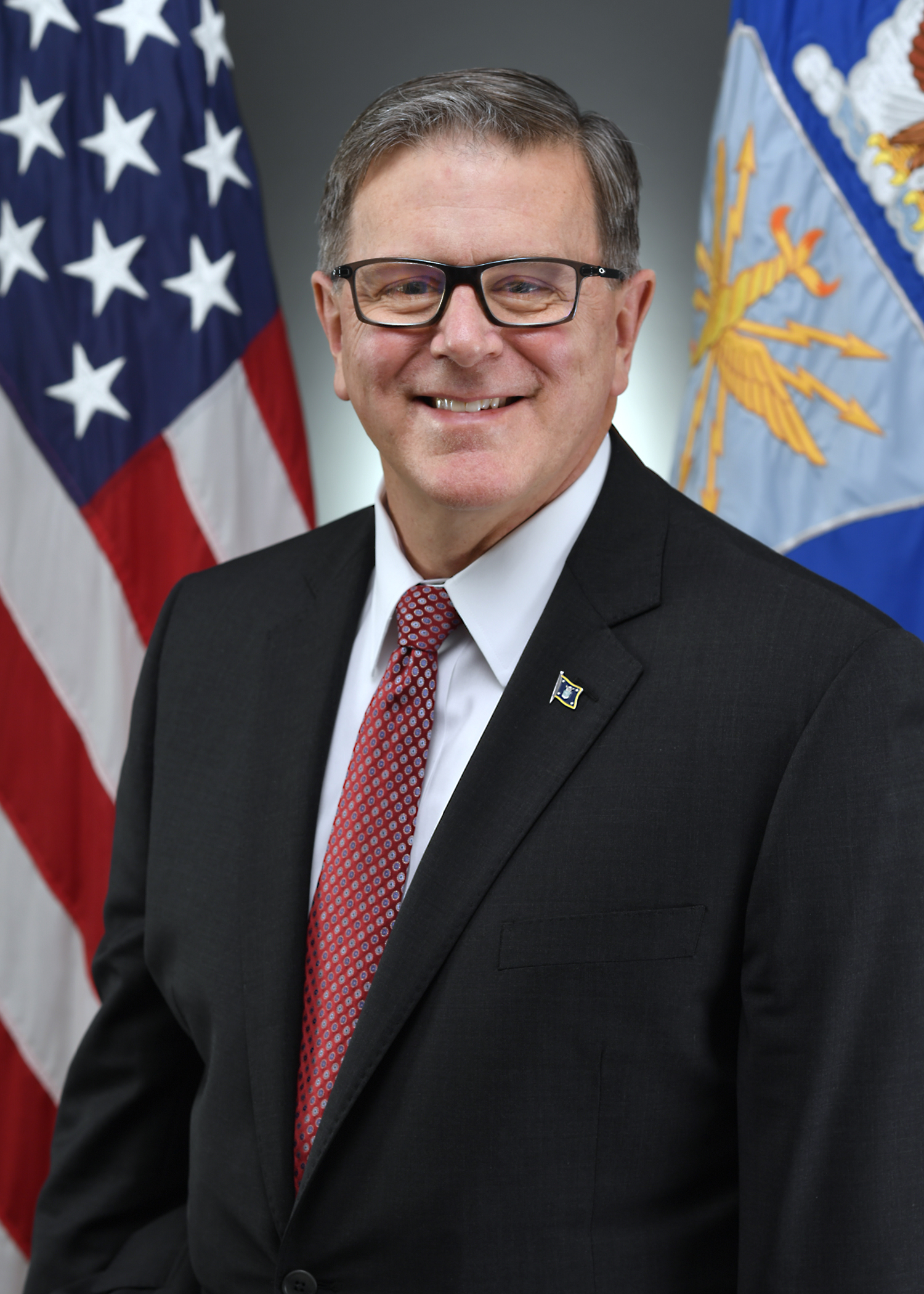
- Official portrait, 2025

United States Secretary of the Air Force
- Acting
- In office January 20, 2025 – May 13, 2025
- President: Donald Trump
- Deputy: Jennifer L. Miller (acting); Edwin Oshiba (acting)
- Preceded by: Frank Kendall III
- Succeeded by: Troy Meink

Assistant Secretary of Defense for Acquisition
- Acting
- In office May 29, 2024 – January 20, 2025
- President: Joe Biden
- Preceded by: Cara L. Abercrombie
- Succeeded by: Brent Ingraham (acting)

Personal details
- Education: Lehigh University (BS); South Dakota School of Mines and Technology (MS)
- Civilian awards: Distinguished Civilian Service Award

Military service
- Allegiance: United States
- Branch/service: United States Air Force
- Years of service: 1988–2009
- Rank: Lieutenant Colonel
- Military awards: Defense Meritorious Service Medal; Meritorious Service Medal (4); Air Force Commendation Medal; Joint Service Achievement Medal; Air Force Achievement Medal

Gary A. Ashworth is an American retired lieutenant colonel who served as the acting United States Secretary of the Air Force from January 2025 until the Senate confirmed Dr. Troy Meink on 13 May 2025.

== Education ==
Ashworth received a Bachelor of Science in electrical engineering from Lehigh University in 1987, and a Master of Science in electrical engineering from South Dakota School of Mines and Technology in 1994.

== Career ==
Ashworth served in the Air Force for over 20 years, before retiring as a Lieutenant Colonel.

On January 20, 2025, President Donald Trump appointed Ashworth the acting United States Secretary of the Air Force.

Political offices
Preceded by Frank Kendall III	United States Secretary of the Air Force; Acting; 2025	Succeeded by Troy Meink
