= Senn High School =

Public secondary school in Chicago, Illinois, US

Location
- 5900 N. Glenwood Avenue; Chicago, Illinois 60660; United States; 41°59′21″N 87°40′00″W

Information
- Type: Public Secondary
- Motto: Learning is a lifelong process. Learning empowers.
- Established: February 3, 1913; 113 years ago
- School district: Chicago Public Schools
- Dean: Terrell Walsh
- Principal: Holly Dacres
- Grades: 9–12
- Gender: Coed
- Enrollment: 1,682 (2020–21)
- Campus type: Urban
- Colors: Forest Green; White
- Athletics conference: Chicago Public League
- Mascot: Bulldogs
- Newspaper: Senn Weekly
- Yearbook: Forum
- Website: www.sennhs.org

Senn High School is a public four-year high school located in the Edgewater neighborhood on the North Side of Chicago, Illinois, United States. Senn is operated by the Chicago Public Schools system and was opened on 3 February 1913. The school is named in honor of surgeon, instructor, and founder of the Association of Military Surgeons of the United States Nicholas Senn. Senn has advanced placement classes, an International Baccalaureate Diploma Program, a fine arts program (theater, visual arts, dance, and music), and a Junior Reserve Officers' Training Corps program. It formerly housed the public but administratively separate, Hyman Rickover Naval Academy. The architect for the Senn High School building and campus was Arthur F. Hussander, who was the chief architect for the Chicago Board of Education; the contractor was Frank Paschen.

== Curriculum ==
Senn was granted the International Baccalaureate program in 1999. Senn also has the TESOL/Multilingual Program, an English as a Second Language program for limited English proficiency students, the Striving for Excellence Program (for a select group of freshmen identified as struggling or at-risk), and the Education-To-Careers Program (for 10th, 11th and 12th graders that includes job shadowing, apprenticeships, and partnerships with local businesses). In 2011, it was announced that Senn would be adding a fine and performing arts magnet program.

== Service learning/extra-curricular activities ==
The school encourages its students to participate in community service. Information regarding service learning is provided by the Service Learning Coach. Student organizations at Senn range from the Global Heritage Club to the Red Cross Club.

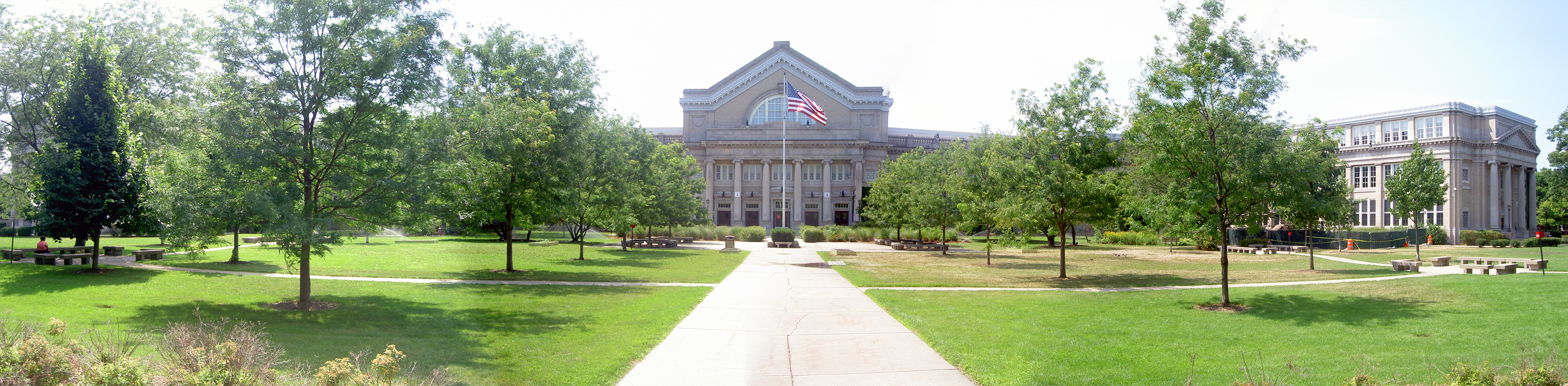
Senn campus, 2009.

== Hyman G. Rickover Naval Academy ==
With support from Mayor Richard M. Daley, Senator Dick Durbin, Alderman Mary Ann Smith, and Chicago Public Schools, a wing of the school was converted into the Rickover Naval Academy, named for Admiral Hyman G. Rickover. On 6 September 2005, the academy opened its doors with approximately 120 cadets and 12 staff members. The academy is a college preparatory school. Rickover Naval Academy moved into their own campus in the Portage Park neighborhood starting with the 2019–2020 school year.

== Notable alumni ==
- Cliff Aberson – professional football player with NFL Green Bay Packers (1946) and a Major League Baseball outfielder (1947–49) with the Chicago Cubs
- Forrest Barnes – radio writer
- Buddy Bregman – musical arranger, record producer and composer
- Corey Holcomb – stand-up comedian, actor, and 5150 Show webcast creator and host
- Donald Briggs – actor
- Penny Ann Early – first female athlete to both be a licensed parimutuel horse racer and play in a men's professional basketball league with the Kentucky Colonels of the American Basketball Association, both during 1968.
- Carlos Eire – historian, writer, professor at Yale University, author of Waiting for Snow in Havana
- Joseph Epstein – writer, essayist, and editor
- Jimmy Evert – tennis coach whose students included Jennifer Capriati and his daughter, Chris Evert
- William Friedkin – Academy Award–winning film director
- Shecky Greene – comedian
- Alan Hargesheimer – professional baseball player for San Francisco Giants, Chicago Cubs, and Kansas City Royals
- Barbara Harris – actress on stage, television, and screen
- Herblock (Herbert Lawrence Block) – political cartoonist, three-time Pulitzer Prize winner, and Presidential Medal of Freedom honoree
- Gene Honda – media spokesman and public address announcer for Chicago White Sox and Chicago Blackhawks
- John Jakes – bestselling author
- Allan Katz – comedy writer, television producer (M*A*S*H)
- Harvey Korman – Emmy Award-winning comedic actor
- Dixie Lee – actress/singer on stage and screen
- Lou Levy – jazz bebop artist
- William Keepers Maxwell, Jr. – novelist and editor
- Don McGuire (born Don Rose) – actor, director, screenwriter, and producer
- Clayton Moore – actor best known for his portrayal of The Lone Ranger
- Lois Nettleton – actress in film and on television for nearly six decades
- Mike North – host of television and radio sports shows
- Anita O'Day – jazz singer
- Malcolm Ross O'Neill – class of 1958, U.S. Army lieutenant general, PhD physicist and government official
- Irna Phillips – creator of radio and TV soap operas
- Fritz Pollard, Jr. – bronze medalist in the 110 meter hurdles at the 1936 Olympics
- Harold Ramis – comedy writer, film director, and actor
- Annette Rogers – gold medalist in 4 x 100 metres relay at 1932 Olympics and 1936 Olympics
- William Russo – jazz arranger and composer
- Sidney Sheldon – Academy Award and Tony Award-winning playwright, screenwriter, and novelist
- Scott Simon – Emmy and Peabody Award-winning writer and radio personality
- Lee Stern – trader at the Chicago Board of Trade, minority owner of Chicago White Sox and president of Chicago's former NASL soccer team, the Sting
- Stanley Tigerman – architect and designer
- Burr Tillstrom – Emmy and Peabody Award-winning puppeteer
- Hal Totten – radio sports announcer with the Chicago Cubs and Chicago White Sox
- Sarajane Wells - Peabody Award-winning actress and educator
- Byron Wien - class of 1950, BA & MBA Harvard, 21 years Chief (later Senior) U.S. Investment Strategist at Morgan Stanley
