= Hugh Studebaker =

American actor (1900–1978)

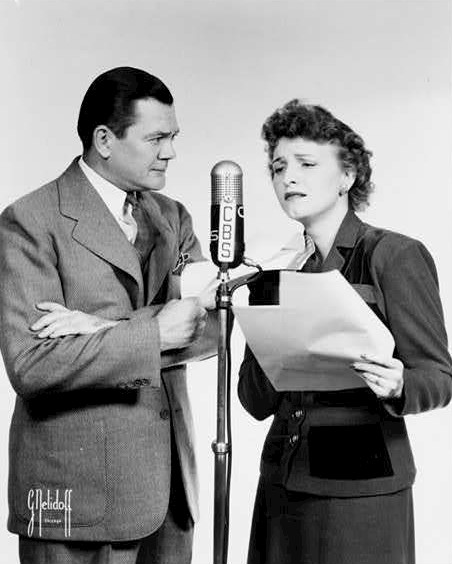
- Studebaker and Marjorie Hannan during an episode of Bachelor's Children
- Born: Hugh Charles Studebaker; May 31, 1900; Ridgeville, Indiana. U.S.
- Died: May 26, 1978 (aged 77); Encino, California, U.S.
- Occupation: Radio actor
- Years active: 1927–1978

Hugh Studebaker (May 31, 1900 – May 26, 1978) was an American actor, born in Ridgeville, Indiana, who starred in old-time radio programs. He was the son of Mr. and Mrs. W.A. Studebaker.

== Early years ==
As a student, Studebaker was the male lead in the opera "King Hal," produced by his high school in Kansas City, Kansas.

Studebaker served in the United States Navy in World War I. After being discharged "at an early age," he took lessons to learn to sing and play the organ and "worked respectively as a blacksmith, salesman and postal clerk -- and didn't do well at any of them." As a member of a quartet, the Night Hawks, Studebaker sang in night clubs and theaters across the United States.

In his early 20s, Studebaker was a member of The Marion Quartette, which toured "under the auspices of the Redpath-Horner institute," Redpath-Horner was part of the Chatauqua movement.

== Career ==
Studebaker first performed on radio in 1927 as part of "Georgie and Porgie, the Breakfast Food Boys." Later, a job at KOIL radio in Omaha, Nebraska, provided "a daily fifteen-minute piano and conversational spot." In 1929, he was hired as an organist at KMBC in Kansas City, Missouri, and soon had acting roles in dramas added to his duties. While at KMBC, he was organist for Ted Malone's Between the Bookends program.

By 1933, Studebaker had a program that was carried on CBS. A radio listing in a 1933 issue of a Fresno, California, newspaper lists "4 P.M., Hugh Studebaker's One Man Show, CBS." He moved to Chicago, Illinois, in 1934. There he "was a free-lance announcer, a disc jockey and occasionally got assignments in daytime dramas."

His roles on network radio programs included the following:

Program	Character
Bachelor's Children	Dr. Bob
Beulah	Harry Henderson (Beulah's employer)
Captain Midnight	Ichabod Mudd
Fibber McGee and Molly	Silly Watson
Guiding Light	Dr. Matthews
Midstream	Charles Meredith
Right to Happiness	Fred Minturn
The Road of Life	Grandpa Sutter
The Story of Mary Marlin	Jonathon
That Brewster Boy	Joey Brewster's father
Whispering Smith	Whispering Smith

Studebaker also appeared in other programs, including The Romance of Helen Trent, Curtain Time, and Knickerbocker Playhouse, and he played Scrooge in A Christmas Carol.

Studebaker's mannerisms during broadcasts sometimes gave people in the studio an added dimension of entertainment. In 1937, a writer commented about the actor's role in Fibber McGee and Molly:

When tall, thin Studebaker shuffles up to the mike as Silly Watson, Fibber, along with the audience, thinks that's very funny. Laughs as much as anyone else. It's not a prop laugh, either; it comes from deep down inside.

== Related activities ==
Studebaker was one of the people who founded the American Federation of Television and Radio Artists.

== Family ==
Studebaker married Bertina Congdon in 1934. She had been his boss at KMBC. He had two brothers, Joseph W. Studebaker and A.A. Studebaker, and a sister, Mrs. Paul Holbrook.

== Death ==
Following a long illness, Studebaker died May 26, 1978, at Valley Presbyterian Hospital.
