= Defense Acquisition University =

US Department of Defense corporate university

Warfighting Acquisition University (formerly Defense Acquisition University)
- Other names: WarU, DAU
- Established: October 22, 1991
- Parent institution: Federal government of the United States, Department of Defense
- Accreditation: COE, IAECT, ACE
- Budget: $220 million
- President: Bilyana Anderson
- Location: Fort Belvoir, Virginia, U.S.
- Website: www.waru.edu

The Warfighting Acquisition University (WarU) (formerly Defense Acquisition University (DAU)) is a corporate university of the United States Department of Defense offering "acquisition, technology, and logistics" (AT&L) training to military and Federal civilian staff and Federal contractors. WarU is headquartered in Fort Belvoir, Virginia, and is accredited by the American Council on Education (ACE), International Association for Continuing Education and Training (IACET) and the Council on Occupational Education (COE).

== History ==
The University Charter was created in October 1991 by Department of Defense (DoD) Directive 5000.57. Originally a loose consortium of existing training commands, DAU worked to standardize the training courses and establish mechanisms that allowed for centralized management of training funds for the DoD workforce.

In the late 1990s, the consortium arrangement was replaced by a centralized structure, more like that of a corporate university. By 2014, DAU had grown to the point of graduating 181,970 students.

Defense Acquisition University (DAU) was renamed Warfighting Acquisition University (WarU) in November 2025 as part of Defense Secretary Hegseth's acquisition transformation initiative.

=== Leadership ===
DAU was headed by a Commandant until the year 2000 when it became a civilian institution, and since then the chief executive position has the title "President." DAU's Commandants and Presidents have included William L. Vincent (1991–1993), Claude M. Bolton (1993–1996), Richard A. Black (1996–1997), Leonard Vincent (1997–1999), Frank J. Anderson (1999–2010), Katrina McFarland (2011–2012), James P. Woolsey (2013–2024), and Bilyana Anderson (2024–Present). Bilyana Anderson oversaw the transition of DAU to WarU under Secretary Hegseth's acquisition transformation initiative and became the first president of WarU.

== Locations ==
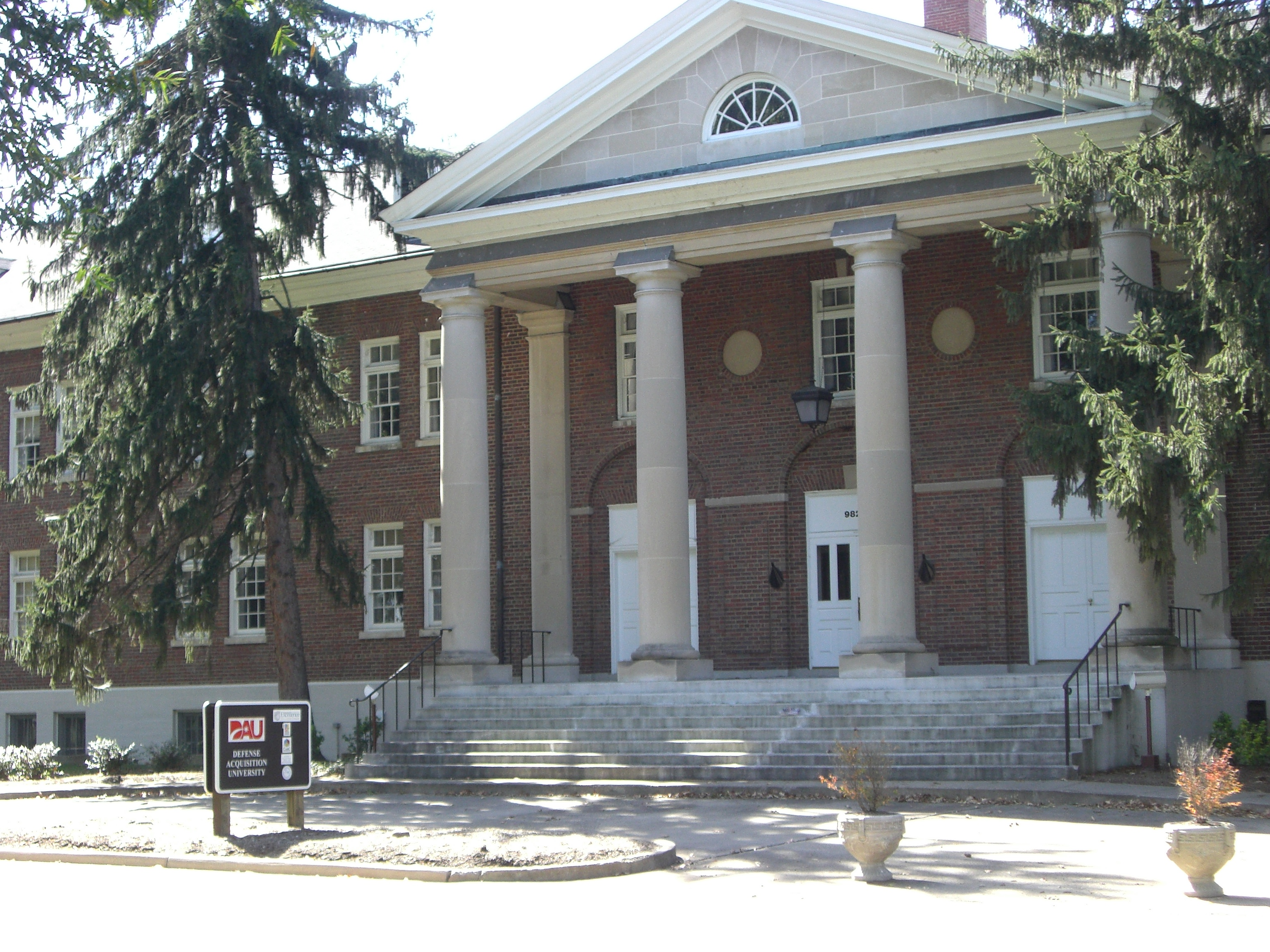
WarU's Headquarters Building on the base of Fort Belvoir near Washington, DC

WarU is headquartered at Fort Belvoir, Virginia, and serves the approximately 160,000 members of the defense acquisition workforce. WarU also has several other locations across the United States as well an online presence. Some of these locations include:

- WarU Capital and Northeast, located at Fort Belvoir, provides services to The Pentagon and Washington DC Department of War agencies, and acquisition and sustainment organizations throughout the Northeast. It serves a workforce of about 35,000 people.
- Defense Systems Management College, also located at Ft Belvoir, on the same campus as the Capital and Northeast Region
- WarU Mid-Atlantic, located in California, Maryland, (near the Patuxent River Naval Air Station)
- WarU South, in Huntsville, Alabama, on Redstone Arsenal, serving 41,000+ members
- WarU Midwest, located in Kettering, Ohio, (just outside Wright-Patterson Air Force Base), serving 25,000+ members
- WarU West in San Diego, serving 30,013 people (as of 2021) in the western United States and the Pacific Rim
- Various satellite locations at major military commands.

== Admissions and costs ==
Applicants must have a current affiliation with the United States government in order to attend training courses offered by WarU. The United States Military Services and the DoD have internal registration and quotas for WarU instructor-led courses, while the Federal Acquisition Institute (FAI) accepts applications and registers most non-DoD students.

U.S. Federal employees and defense contractors may attend WarU courses at no cost when space is available, and may enroll in WarU's Defense acquisition credential learning pathways, and in online courses. WarU charges tuition only to certain foreign students.

== Training and certificates ==
The Defense Acquisition Workforce Improvement Act (DAWIA) requires Defense Acquisition Workforce members to be certified for the positions they hold. WarU offers training courses for all Defense Acquisition Workforce members in seven functional areas and at three certification levels.

Functional Areas:

- Auditing
- Business:
  - Financial Management
  - Cost Estimating
- Contracting
- Engineering and Technical Management
- Life Cycle Logistics
- Program Management
- Test and Evaluation

The American Council on Education (ACE) assigns ACE credits to various WarU courses. WarU coursework can apply toward college and university degrees and certificates at some partner institutions.

=== Defense Acquisition Guide ===
The Defense Acquisition Guidebook (DAG) is a text developed to aid in the understanding and implementation of United States Department of Defense Acquisition practices under the DoD Directive 5000 series. This text, also available in web-accessed electronic format and web-structured HTML basis (see https://aaf.dau.edu/guidebooks/) provides insight to a life cycle view and functional roles within the lifecycle of acquisitions.

In 2002, the DOD 5000.2-R became the Interim Defense Acquisition Guidebook.

== Mission assistance ==
WarU instructors are available to consult and assist acquisition organizations in the design and review of processes and internal training when they are not teaching. They can also provide workshops and specific topic instruction in areas of interest or concern tailored to a specific organization.

== Hacking incident ==
In July 2011, a hacking incident occurred affecting DAU's Web-based training site. This incident occurred on a vendor's network that provided the learning management system's underlying source code and inhibited access to online courses for almost two months. While DAU was not hacked, U.S. Cyber Command (U.S. CYBERCOM) evaluated the risk level to DAU's system based on the incident that occurred on the vendor's network, and temporarily suspended online training courses to secure the system and protect students' personal information.

== See also ==
- Military acquisition
- Joint Capabilities Integration Development System
- Federal Acquisition Regulation
