= Girl Alone =

Girl Alone was an American radio soap opera broadcast on NBC from 1935 to 1941. Sponsored by Kellogg's and Quaker Oats, the series was scripted by Fayette Krum.

== Characters and story ==
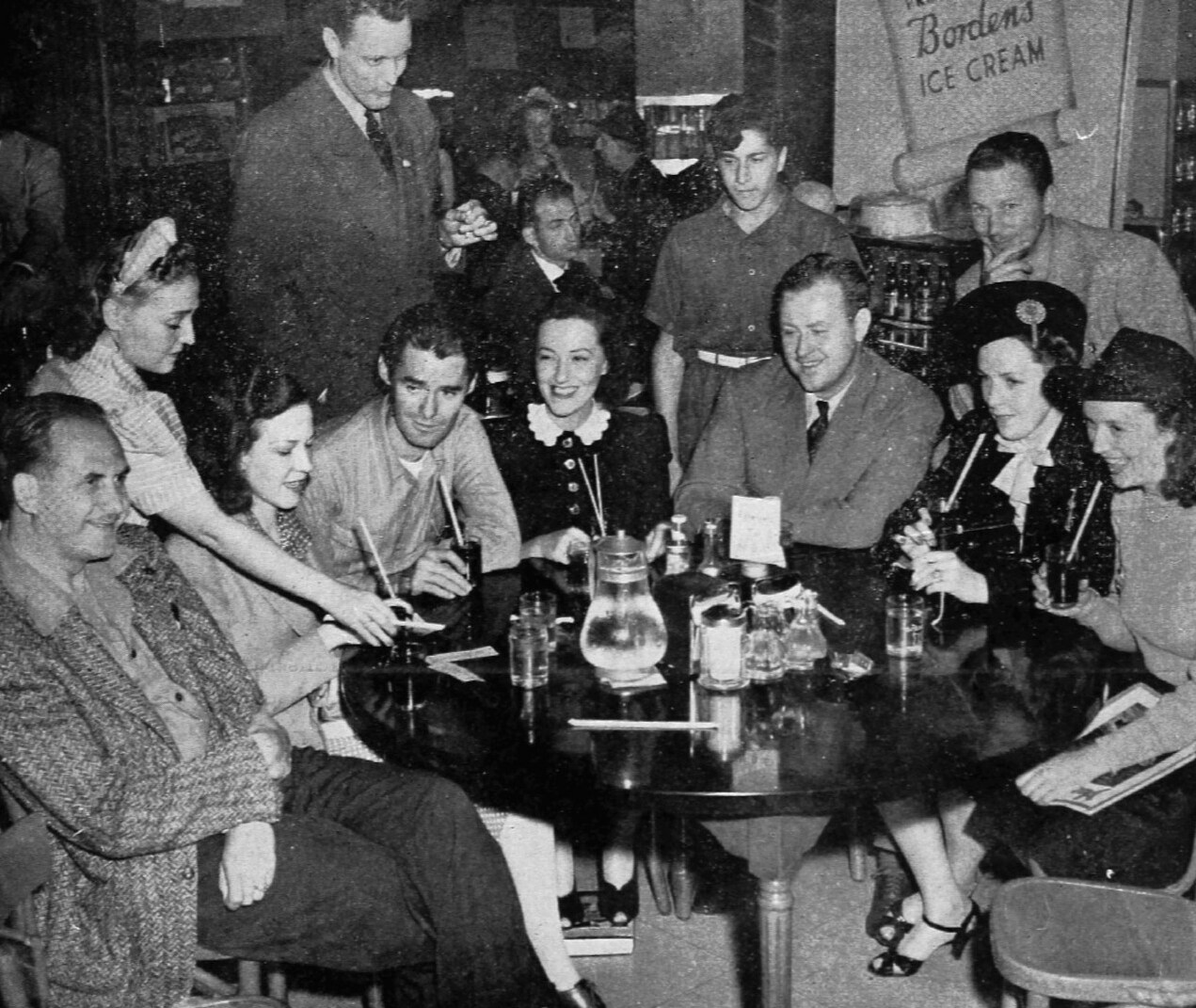
The cast of the program taking a refreshment break in January 1941. Seated, from left:Herbert Butterfield (Zeihm), Laurette Fillbrandt (Virginia Richman), John Larkin (Frankie McGinnis), Betty Winkler (Patricia Rogers), Pat Murphy (Scoop Curtis), Joan Winters (Alice Ames Warner), Frances Carlon (Ruth Lardner). Standing from left: Director Charles Urquhart, Frankie Pacelli (Jack), Henry Hunter (Scotson Webb)

After inheriting a fortune, Patricia Rogers (Betty Winkler) falls in love with the trustee of her estate, John Knight, portrayed by Karl Weber, Les Damon, Macdonald Carey, Bob Bailey and Syd Simons. Separating from Knight and leaving Chicago, Rogers enters into a romantic relationship with Phoenix newspaperman Scoop Curtis (Don Briggs, Pat Murphy, Arthur Jacobson), who is later paralyzed by an automobile accident.

Other characters and the actors who played them were as follows:

Character	Actor
Jack Rogers	Frank Pacelli
Scoop Curtis	Pat Murphy
Stormy Wilson Curtis	June Travis
Virginia Richman	Laurette Fillbrandt
Dr. John Richman	Michael Romano
Alice Ames Warner	Joan Winters
Aunt Kate	Kathryn Card
Ruth Lardner	Frances Carlon
Scotson Webb	Henry Hunter
Dr. Warren Douglas	Henry Hunter
Joe Markham	Arthur Hohl
Arthur Cook	Charles Penman
Muggsy Modoc	Bob Jellison
W. C. Green	Stanley Gordon
Ziehm	Herb Butterfield
Frankie McGinnis	John Larkin
McCullough	John Hodiak
Keil	Carlton Brickert
Emmett Dayton	Ian Keith
Henry Senrich	Willard Waterman
Lt. Custer	Art Peterson
Lewis	Bob Jellison
Chuprin	Don Gallagher

The announcers were Bob Brown and Charles Lyon.

The program's theme was "The Girl Alone Suite" by Don Marcotte. Gordon Hughes and Axel Gruenberg directed.
