= Sarajane Wells =

American actress and educator

Sarajane Wells (born Sara Jane Wells, December 8, 1913 - January 10, 1987) was an American actress who was active in old-time radio and later became an educator.

== Early years ==
Wells was a native of Owensboro, Kentucky, the daughter of Clark and Martha Wells. When she was young, she and her family moved to Chicago. There she took classes in acting and attended Senn High School. She was designated as one of four outstanding seniors at Senn, where her activities included being a member of the Senn Players and the Honor Society. For two years she studied at the School of the Art Institute of Chicago, and she graduated from Northwestern University in 1938. She acted on radio while she was a student, and she performed with the Players' Guild of Evanston.

== Career ==
Wells portrayed Betty Fairfield, the girlfriend of the title character on Jack Armstrong, the All-American Boy on radio. Her other roles on radio included Mary Rutledge on The Guiding Light. Kaaren on Flying Patrol, Carol Evans on Road of Life, Eileen Holmes on Woman in White, and Louise Sims on The Right to Happiness. She received a Peabody Award in 1949 for her performance in the radio adaptation of Ernest Hemingway's The Short Happy Life of Francis Macomber.

Wells moved to Hollywood in the 1940s, but after the growth of television resulted in the elimination of serial programming on radio, she returned to Chicago. She worked for the Chicago Historical Society, first as an associate and later as its director of education. Wells's efforts for the society increased activities for young people, particularly with hands-on exhibits and programs oriented to children. Those activities included Museum Mornings on Saturdays during the school year and weekly summer programs that dramatized people and events from history and literature. She also provided narration to accompany many exhibits.

Wells was educational consultant for filmstrips about Chicago for the Society for Visual Education and the International Film Bureau.

== Personal life and death ==
Wells was involved in a variety of civic activities in Chicago, including being chair of the Old Town Bal Masque, the Old Town art Center, and the School of the Old Town Art Center. She was a member of the boards of the Lincoln Park Conservation Association and the Old Town Triangle Association.

Wells was married to Oliver Mahan, a sales manager for American Airlines. On March 12, 1942, she married actor Dolph Nelson in Chicago. She died from complications of Alzheimer's disease on January 10, 1987, in a nursing home in Chicago, aged 73.
