= Karl Weber (actor) =

American actor (1916–1990)

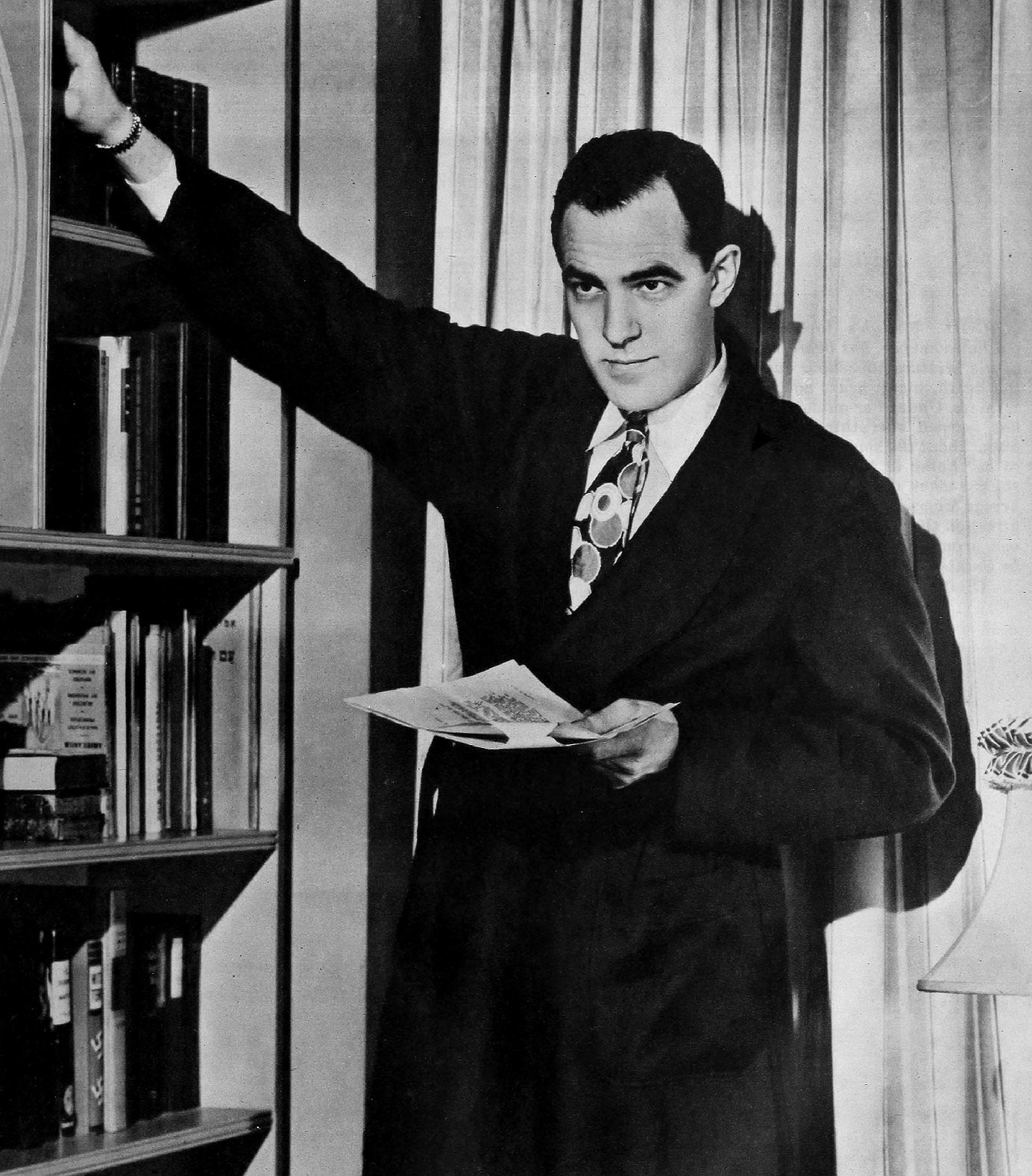
- Weber as Gary Bennett in 1945
- Born: March 17, 1916; Columbus Junction, Iowa
- Died: July 30, 1990 (aged 74); Boston, Massachusetts
- Education: Cornell College; University of Iowa
- Occupation: Actor
- Spouse: Marjorie
- Children: 1 daughter 2 sons

Karl Weber (March 17, 1916 – July 30, 1990) was an actor in the era of old-time radio.

== Early years ==
A native of Columbus Junction, Iowa, Weber attended Cornell College and was a graduate of the University of Iowa. He had three brothers and two sisters.

== Stage ==
Before going into radio, Weber acted with Shakespearean troupes in the Midwest. In the late 1940s, he helped to found the New Stages off-Broadway group in New York City. His Broadway credits include The Land of Fame and Lady Behave.

== Radio ==
Weber's roles in radio programs included those shown in the table below.

Program	Role
Alias John Freedom	John Freedom
The Doctor's Wife	Dr. Dan Palmer
Dr. Sixgun	Dr. Ray Matson
Girl Alone	John Knight
Inspector Thorne	Inspector Thorne
Lorenzo Jones	Verne Massey
Nona from Nowhere	Vernon Dutell
The Romance of Helen Trent	Brett Chapman
The Second Mrs. Burton	Brad Burton
The Strange Romance of Evelyn Winters	Gary Bennett
When a Girl Marries	Phil Stanley
Woman in White	Dr. Kirk Harding

== Television ==
Weber played Arthur Tate in Search for Tomorrow. He also appeared on Maverick, Dr. Kildare, and Perry Mason.

== Film ==
Weber portrayed FBI agent Charlie Reynolds in Walk East on Beacon (1952).

== Commercials ==
In the mid-1960s, Weber was featured in commercials for Avis Rent a Car. The company spent $6 million on the campaign in its first year. He also made commercials for Lyndon B. Johnson's and Nelson A. Rockefeller's campaigns for president.

== Other activities ==
In 1968–1969, Weber was president of New York's chapter of the Screen Actors Guild. He also used his talent to record more than 200 books for the American Foundation for the Blind.

== Personal life ==
Weber met his wife, Marjorie, when they were students at Cornell College. They had a daughter, Lynn, and two sons, Christopher and Mark.

== Death ==
Weber died of congestive heart failure in Boston, Massachusetts, on July 30, 1990. He was 74.
