= Air Force Security Assistance Center =

Air Force Security Assistance and Cooperation (AFSAC) Directorate
- Active: 2012 -Present
- Country: United States
- Branch: United States Air Force
- Size: Directorate
- Part of: Air Force Materiel Command; Air Force Life Cycle Management Center
- Garrison/HQ: Wright-Patterson Air Force Base

The Air Force Security Assistance and Cooperation (AFSAC) Directorate at Wright-Patterson Air Force Base, Ohio, develops and executes international agreements with friendly forces to provide defense materiel and services, in support of US national security. It has been a staff agency of the Air Force Life Cycle Management Center of the Air Force Materiel Command since 1 October 2012 when it replaced the Air Force Security Assistance Center. The office symbol of the Directorate is AFLCMC/WF.

From 1992–2012, the unit was known as the Air Force Security Assistance Center. Prior to that, AFSAC was designated the International Logistics Center (ILC) (1978–1992) and the International Logistics Directorate, Air Force Acquisition Logistics Division (1976–1978).

== Staff agencies ==
- WFA – Regional Support Division
- WFE – Foreign Military Sales Construction Division
- WFF – Financial Management Division
- WFK – Contract Execution Division
- WFI – International Division
- WFM – Central Division
- WFN – International Affairs Policy and Programs Division
- WFO – Operations Management Division
- WFR – Information Technology Services Division

== Predecessor ==
- Constituted as the AFLC International Logistics Center on 12 April 1978

Activated on 1 May 1978
Redesignated Air Force Security Assistance Center on 1 July 1992
Inactivated on 1 October 2012

- Assigned to

Air Force Logistics Command, 1 May 1978
Air Force Materiel Command, 1 July 1992 – 1 October 2012 (attached to Air Force Life Cycle Management Center after 9 July 2012)

- Stationed at Wright-Patterson Air Force Base, Ohio, 1 May 1978 – 1 October 2012
