= List of commanders of 7th Infantry Division (United States) =

Shoulder sleeve insignia of the US 7th Infantry Division.

This is a list of commanders of the 7th Infantry Division of the United States Army.

== Past commanders ==
- COL Guy H. Preston, January 1918
- BG Charles H. Barth, January – February 1918
- BG Tiemann N. Horn, February 1918
- BG Charles H. Barth, February 1918 – June 1918
- BG Tiemann N. Horn, June 1918
- BG Charles H. Barth, June – October 1918
- BG Lutz Wahl, October 1918
- MG Edmund Wittenmyer, October 1918 – January 1919
- BG Guy H. Preston, January 1919
- MG Edmund Wittenmyer, January 1919 – May 1919
- BG Lutz Wahl, May 1919
- MG Edmund Wittenmyer, May – June 1919
- BG Lutz Wahl, July 1919 – October 1919
- MG Edward F. McGlachlin Jr., October 1919 – July 1921
- MG Charles J. Bailey, July – August 1921
- MG Harry H. Bandholtz, August – September 1921
- Division inactive, 22 September 1921 – 1 July 1940
- MG Joseph W. Stilwell, July 1940 – August 1941
- MG Charles H. White, August 1941 – April 1942
- MG Albert E. Brown, April 1942 – May 1943
- MG Eugene M. Landrum. May – July 1943
- BG Archibald V. Arnold, July – September 1943
- MG Charles H. Corlett, September 1943 – February 1944
- MG Archibald V. Arnold, February 1944 – September 1945
- BG Joseph L. Ready, September 1945 – March 1946
- MG Andrew D. Bruce, March – June 1946
- BG Leroy J. Stewart, June 1946 – October 1947
- BG Harlan N. Hartness, October 1947 – January 1948
- MG John B. Coulter, January – June 1948
- BG Edwin W. Piburn, June – September 1948
- MG William F. Dean, September 1948 – May 1949
- MG David G. Barr, May 1949 – January 1951
- MG Claude B. Ferenbaugh, January – December 1951
- MG Lyman L. Lemnitzer, December 1951 – July 1952
- MG Wayne C. Smith, July 1952 – March 1953
- MG Arthur G. Trudeau, March – October 1953
- MG Lionel C. McGarr, October 1953 – May 1954
- MG Edmund Sebree, May 1954 – August 1955
- MG Paul W. Caraway, August 1955 – April 1956
- BG Ralph J. Butchers, April – June 1956
- MG Carl H. Jark, June 1956 – September 1957
- MG Thomas J. Sands, September 1957 – April 1958
- MG Normando A. Costello, April 1958 – June 1959
- MG Teddy H. Sanford, June 1959 – August 1960
- MG Tom R. Stoughton, August 1960 – September 1962
- BG Frank S. Henry, September 1962 – January 1963
- MG Chester A. Dahlen, January – August 1963
- MG David W. Gray, August 1963 – June 1964
- MG Ferdinand T. Unger, June 1964 – August 1965
- MG Chester L. Johnson, August 1965 – July 1966
- MG Frederick W. Boye Jr., July 1966 – September 1967
- MG William A. Enemark, September 1967 – August 1968
- MG Osmund A. Leahy, August 1968 – November 1968
- BG James K. Terry, November 1968 – January 1969
- MG Edward P. Smith, January 1969 – May 1970
- MG Harold G. Moore, May 1970 – April 1971
- Division inactive, 2 April 1971 - 21 October 1974
- MG William Hardin Harrison, January 1985 – July 1987
- MG Edwin H. Burba Jr., July 1987 – June 1988
- MG Carmen J. Cavezza, June 1988 – May 1990
- MG Jerry A. White, May 1990 – September 1991
- MG Marvin L. Covault, September 1991 – April 1993
- MG Richard F. Timmons, March 1993 – September 1994
- Division inactive, 1 October 1994 – 4 June 1999
- MG John M. Riggs, June 1999
- MG Edward Soriano, June 1999 – October 2001
- MG Charles C. Campbell, October 2001 – October 2002
- MG Robert (Bob) Wilson, October 2002 – January 2005
- MG Robert W. Mixon Jr., January 2005 – August 2006
- Division inactive, August 2006 – 11 October 2012
- MG Stephen R. Lanza, October 2012 – February 2014
- MG Terry Ferrell, February 2014 – August 2014
- MG Thomas S. James Jr., August 2014 – July 2017
- MG Willard M. Burleson, July 2017 – August 2019
- MG Xavier T. Brunson, August 2019 – May 2021
- MG Stephen G. Smith, May 2021 – September 2023
- MG Michelle A. Schmidt, September 2023 – October 2025
