= Christopher LaNeve =

American general (born 1967)

Chris LaNeve
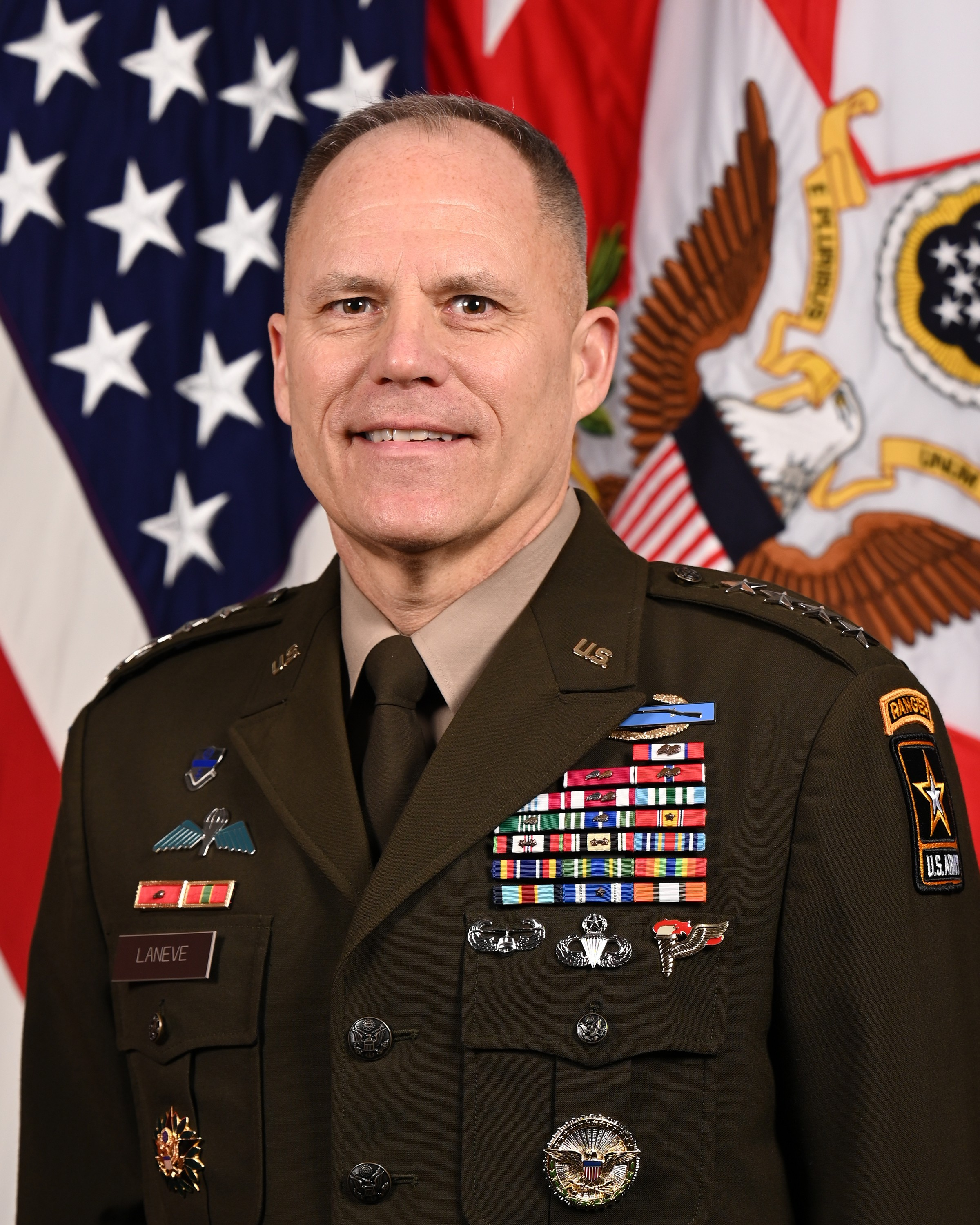
- Official portrait, 2026
- Born: April 25, 1967 (age 59); Pittsburgh, Pennsylvania, U.S.
- Education: University of Arizona (BA); Central Michigan University (MS); United States Army Command and General Staff College (MMAS)
- Military career
- Allegiance: United States
- Branch: United States Army
- Service years: 1990–present
- Rank: General
- Commands: Chief of Staff of the Army (acting); Vice Chief of Staff of the Army; Eighth Army; 82nd Airborne Division; 7th Army Training Command; 3rd Brigade Combat Team, 1st Armored Division; 2nd Battalion, 325th Infantry Regiment
- Conflicts: War in Afghanistan; Iraq War
- Awards: Army Distinguished Service Medal (3); Legion of Merit (4); Bronze Star Medal (3)

Christopher C. LaNeve (born April 25, 1967) is an American general who serves as the 40th vice chief of staff of the United States Army since 6 February 2026. He became the acting chief of staff of the Army on 2 April 2026. He most recently served as the Senior Military Assistant to the Secretary of Defense, Pete Hegseth, from 2025 to 2026.

A native of Pennsylvania, LaNeve received his commission as an Infantry officer in 1990, through the University of Arizona's Army Reserve Officers' Training Corps program. He was deployed during the Iraq War and the War in Afghanistan. LaNeve commanded the 7th Army Training Command from 2018 to 2019, the 82nd Airborne Division from 2022 to 2023, and concurrently served as commanding general of the Eighth Army and chief of staff of the Republic of Korea/United States Combined Forces Command from 2024 to 2025.

== Early life and education ==
LaNeve is a native of Pittsburgh, Pennsylvania. He obtained an undergraduate degree from the University of Arizona in 1989, a Master's of Science in Administration from Central Michigan University, and a Master's of Military Art and Science in Strategic Studies from the Command and General Staff College Advanced Operational Art Studies Fellowship. His military education includes the Infantry Officer Basic and Advanced Courses, the Combined Arms Services Staff School, the Command and General Staff College, the Joint Forces Staff College, and Senior Service College Fellows Course.

== Army career ==
LaNeve received his commission via the Army Reserve Officers' Training Corps at the University of Arizona as an Infantry officer in May 1990. His initial assignment was to Fort Ord, where he served in 4th Battalion, 21st Infantry, 7th Infantry Division. As a Captain, he commanded a company in the 101st Airborne Division, 3d Battalion, 327th Infantry as well as the Sabalauski Air Assault School after completing the Infantry Officer's Advanced Course and service at the Western Illinois University ROTC program. He then transferred to Washington, D.C. in 1999 where he was assigned as the Executive Officer to the Army Assistant Deputy Chief of Staff for Operations and Plans (G-3/5/7), and later the Deputy Director of Executive Communications and Control Division-Operations in the Office of the Chief of Staff of the Army.

Following Command and General Staff College, while a major, he was assigned to 1st Brigade Combat Team, 10th Mountain Division. He served as the Brigade S4 and Operations Officer for 1st Battalion, 87th Infantry, and subsequently as the Brigade Operations Officer. In 2006, he was assigned to the Defense Intelligence Agency, Joint Staff, Washington, D.C., where he served in the Defense Warning Office.

LaNeve commanded 2nd Battalion, 325th Airborne Infantry Regiment, 2nd Brigade Combat Team, 82nd Airborne Division. Following command, he assumed duties as the J3, Combined Joint Task Force 82 in Regional Command East, Afghanistan. Upon redeployment, he served as the G3, 82nd Airborne Division. LTG LaNeve went on to command the "Bulldog BCT," 3rd Brigade Combat Team, 1st Armored Division at Fort Bliss, and Operations Group (COG), Joint Readiness Training Center at Fort Polk. After his time at Fort Polk, he served as the Executive Officer to the Commander, Resolute Support Mission, Afghanistan and then as the Deputy Commanding General for Operations, 82nd Airborne Division, Fort Bragg, North Carolina. Afterwards, he served as the Commanding General for the 7th Army Training Command, Grafenwoehr, Germany, and then at the Pentagon as the HQDA Director of Operations, Readiness, and Mobilization in the Office of the Deputy Chief of Staff (G-3/5/7). Prior to command of the 82nd Airborne Division he served as the Deputy Chief of Staff (G-3/5/7) for U.S. Army Forces Command, Fort Bragg, North Carolina.

LaNeve was the commanding general of the 82nd Airborne Division from March 2022 until November 2023, during which time the division was deployed to Poland due to the Russian invasion of Ukraine. From November 2023 to March 2024, he was a special assistant to the commanding general of U.S. Army Forces Command at Fort Bragg. LaNeve assumed command of the United States Eighth Army in South Korea on 5 April 2024. In March 2025, LaNeve was nominated for reappointment as a lieutenant general and assignment as senior military assistant to the secretary of defense. He relinquished command of the Eighth Army on 16 April 2025 and took the post of senior military assistant to defense secretary Pete Hegseth.

=== Vice chief of staff and acting chief ===
In October 2025, LaNeve was nominated by President Donald Trump for assignment as the vice chief of staff of the United States Army and for appointment to the grade of general, replacing James Mingus. He was confirmed by the Senate on 7 January 2026, and took office on 6 February 2026. LaNeve became the acting chief of staff of the Army after the removal of Randy George by Pete Hegseth on 2 April 2026, amid the Iran war.

The Wall Street Journal reported in August 2026 that he had not been nominated for the position because his selection faced opposition from some Republicans on the Senate Armed Service Committee, including Senator Joni Ernst. LaNeve had been a four-star general for only six months, which is unusual for a chief of staff of the Army, and Ernst was among a group of senators that were concerned about his qualifications. In August 2026 it was also reported that LaNeve decided to disband the Unmanned Assault Battalion of the 173rd Airborne Brigade, reportedly because of tensions between him and the generals Randy George and Chris Donahue, who had set up the unit to integrate the lessons of drone warfare in Ukraine. He published a letter that month outlining his vision for the strategic direction of the Army.

In September, LaNeve stated that the decision to disband the Unmanned Assault Battalion had been made before he became the acting chief of staff. He selected United States Army Futures and Concepts Command to become the Army Futures and Autonomous Systems Command on 13 October, in accordance with a 1 October memo from acting Army Secretary Adam Telle on the branch's autonomous warfare initiatives. LaNeve tasked the command with building corps-level autonomous capabilities with I Corps, III Armored Corps, V Corps, XVIII Airborne Corps, and Eighth Army.

On 16 November 2026, LaNeve was nominated by Trump to serve as the chief of staff of the Army, while Lt. Gen. Marcus S. Evans was nominated to take his position as the vice chief of staff.

== Awards and decorations ==
LaNeve's awards and decorations include:

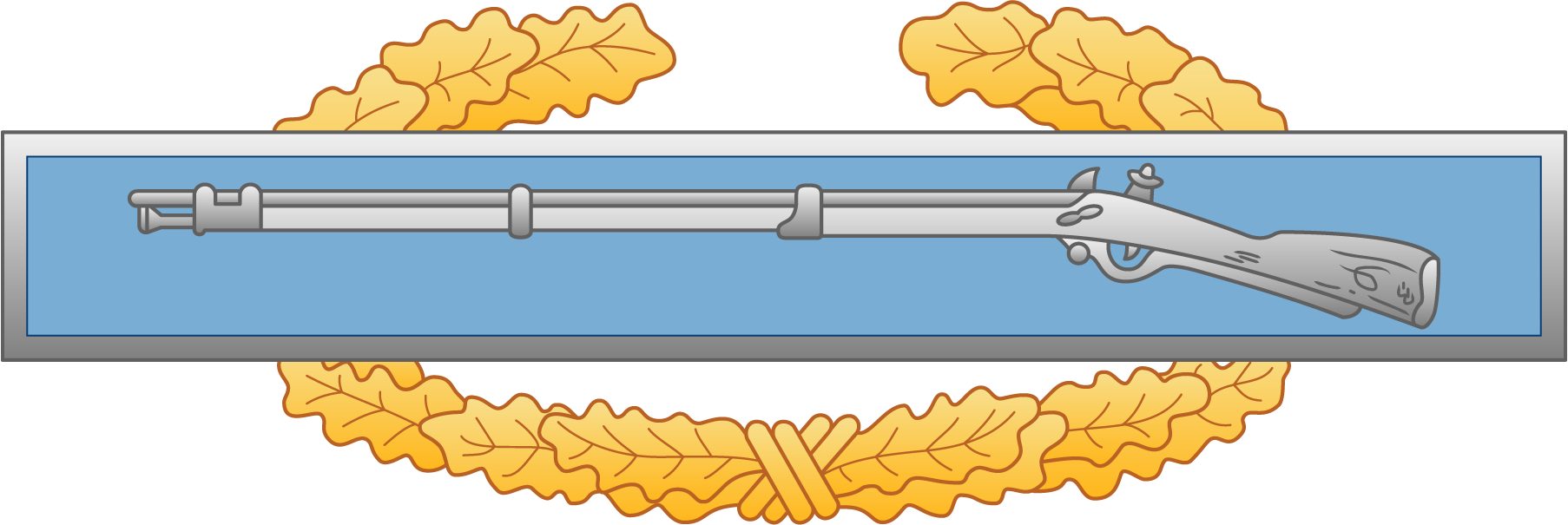

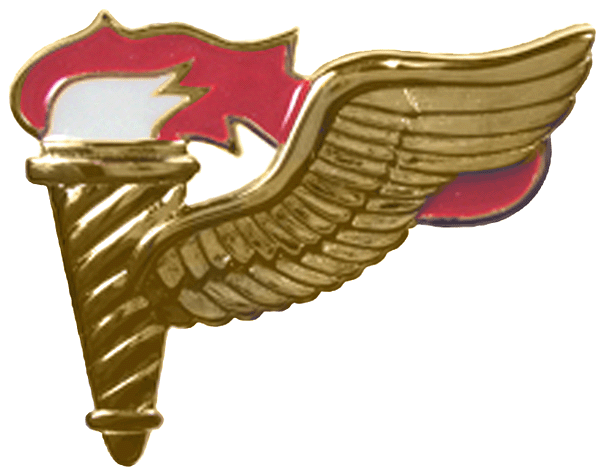
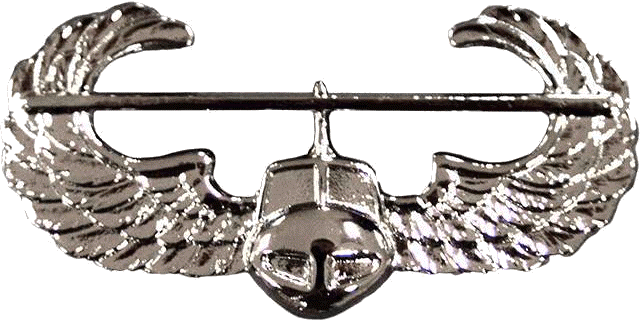

Master Combat Infantryman Badge
Army Distinguished Service Medal with two oak leaf clusters		Legion of Merit with two oak leaf clusters
Bronze Star Medal with two oak leaf clusters	Defense Meritorious Service Medal	Meritorious Service Medalwith two oak leaf clusters
Joint Service Commendation Medal	Army Commendation Medal with oak leaf cluster	Army Achievement Medal with oak leaf cluster
National Defense Service Medal with star	Afghanistan Campaign Medal with two stars	Iraq Campaign Medal with two stars
Global War on Terrorism Expeditionary Medal	Global War on Terrorism Service Medal	Korea Defense Service Medal
Army Service Ribbon	Army Overseas Service	NATO Medal; Non-Article 5 with star
Multinational Force and Observers Medal	Meritorious Unit Award with oak leaf cluster	Army Superior Unit Award
Master Parachutist Badge	Pathfinder Badge	Air Assault Badge
Ranger Tab

Other accoutrements
325th Infantry Regiment Insignia
82nd Airborne Division Shoulder Sleeve Insignia - Former Wartime Service
United Kingdom Parachutist Badge
9 Overseas Service Bars

== Dates of promotion ==
Rank	Branch	Date
Second lieutenant	Army	May 1990
First lieutenant	Army	May 1992
Captain	Army	1994
Major	Army	6 October 2000
Lieutenant colonel	Army	29 September 2006
Colonel	Army	17 February 2012
Brigadier general	Army	2 April 2018
Major general	Army	25 February 2021
Lieutenant general	Army	5 April 2024
General	Army	6 February 2026

== Personal life ==
LaNeve and his wife Kim have a daughter and a son who are officers serving in the U.S. Army.

Military offices
Preceded by Antonio Aguto	Commanding General of the 7th Army Training Command; 2018–2019	Succeeded by Christopher Norrie
Preceded by Chris Donahue	Commanding General of the 82nd Airborne Division; 2022–2023	Succeeded by J. Patrick Work
Preceded by Willard Burleson	Commanding General of the Eighth United States Army; Chief of Staff of the ROK/US Combined Forces Command; 2024–2025	Succeeded by Sean Crockett; Acting
Vacant Title last held by Jennifer Short	Senior Military Assistant to the Secretary of Defense; 2025–2026	Vacant Title next held by John F.G. Wade
Preceded by James Mingus	Vice Chief of Staff of the United States Army; 2026–present	Incumbent
Preceded by Randy George	Chief of Staff of the United States Army; Acting; 2026–present	Incumbent
