= Vice Chief of Staff of the United States Army =

Second highest-ranking officer of the United States Army

Vice Chief of Staff of the Army
- Army Staff identification badge

- Flag of the Vice Chief of Staff of the Army

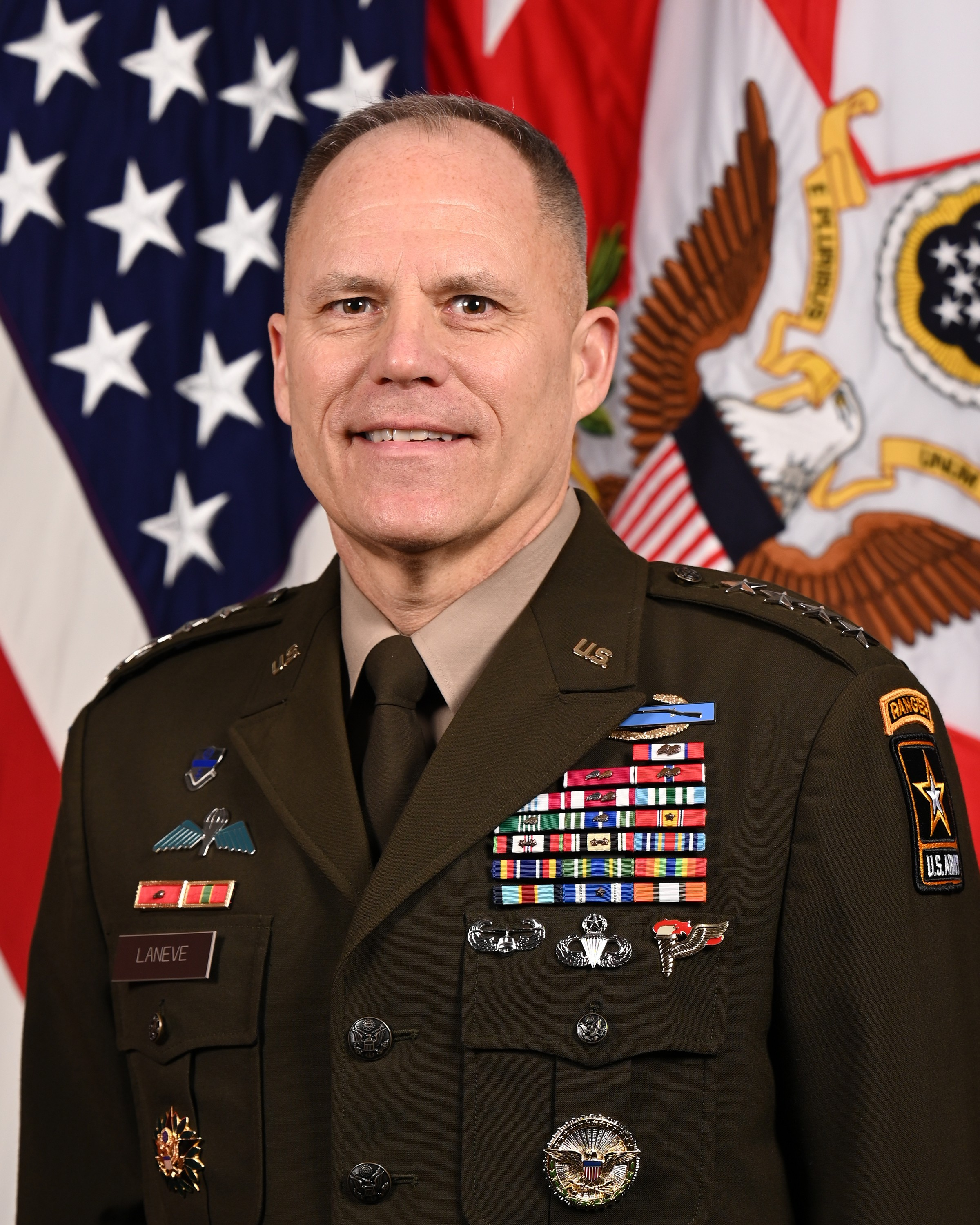
- Incumbent; General Christopher C. LaNeve since February 6, 2026
- Department of the Army; Army Staff
- Abbreviation: VCSA
- Member of: Army Staff; Joint Requirements Oversight Council
- Reports to: Chief of Staff of the Army
- Seat: The Pentagon, Arlington County, Virginia, U.S.
- Appointer: The president; with Senate advice and consent
- Term length: Not fixed
- Constituting instrument: 10 U.S.C. § 7034
- Precursor: Deputy Chief of Staff of the United States Army
- Formation: November 1, 1948
- First holder: GEN J. Lawton Collins
- Succession: First in chief of staff succession
- Deputy: Director of the Army Staff
- Website: www.army.mil/

The vice chief of staff of the Army (VCSA) is the principal deputy to the chief of staff of the Army, and is the second-highest-ranking officer on active duty in the Department of the Army.

The vice chief of staff generally handles the day-to-day administration of the Army Staff, freeing the chief of staff to attend to the interservice responsibilities of the Joint Chiefs of Staff. By statute, the vice chief of staff is appointed as a four-star general in the United States Army while so serving.

The 40th and current vice chief of staff of the Army is General Christopher LaNeve.

== Role ==
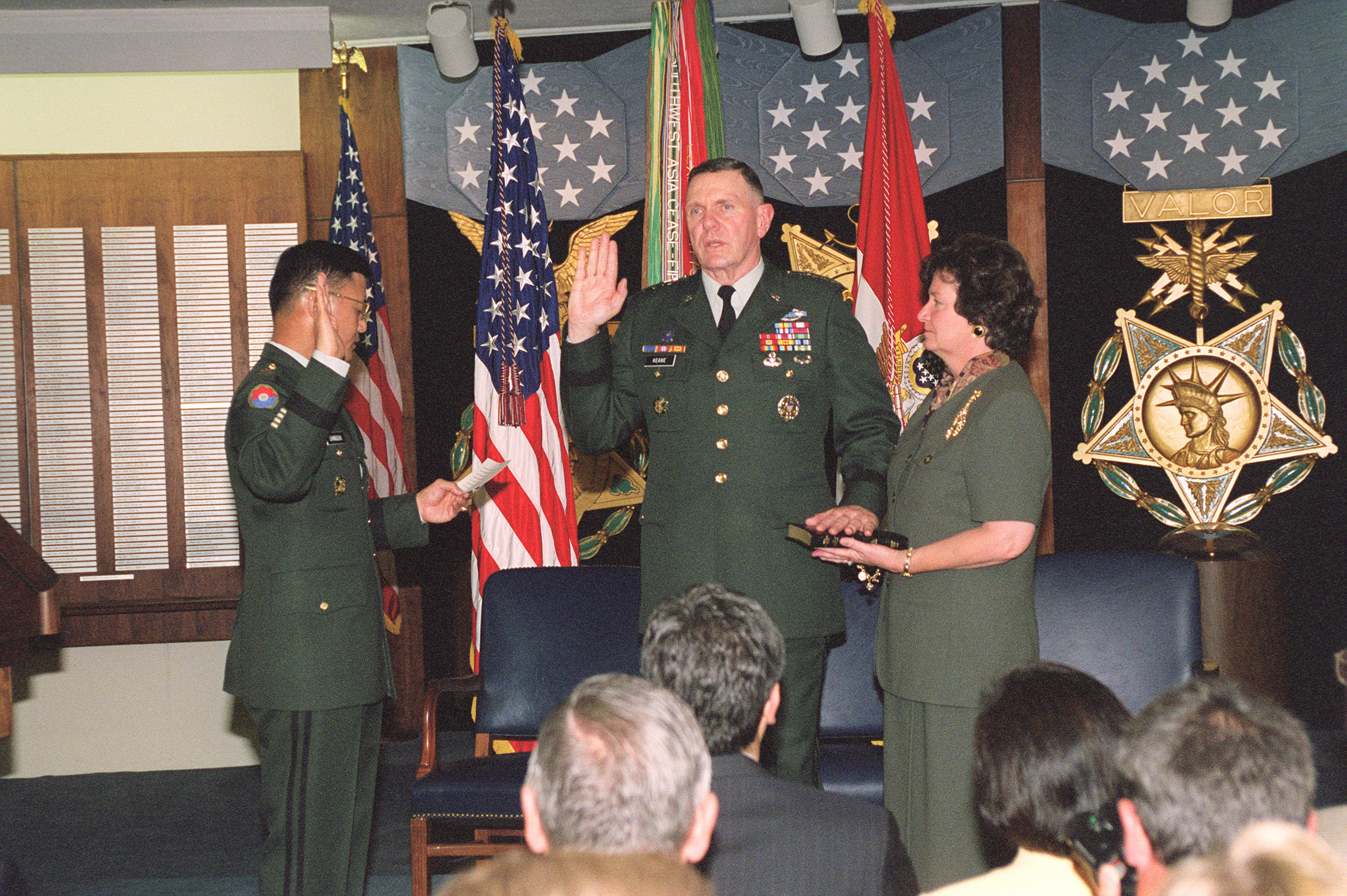
Gen. Eric Shinseki, chief of staff of the Army, swears in Gen. Jack Keane as the 29th vice chief of staff of the Army on June 22, 1999.

The senior leadership of the U.S. Department of the Army consists of two civilians, the secretary of the Army and the under secretary of the Army, as well as two commissioned officers, the Army chief of staff and the Army vice chief of staff.

Under the supervision and direction of the secretary of the Army (who in turn is under the authority, direction and control of the secretary of defense) the vice chief of staff assists the chief of staff on missions and functions related to their duties. The vice chief of staff also assists the chief of staff in the management/oversight of U.S. Army installations and facilities.

Furthermore, the vice chief of staff may also represent the Army at the Office of the Secretary of Defense/Joint Staff level in areas relating to the chief of staff's responsibility and U.S. Army capabilities, requirements, policy, plans, and programs. The vice chief of staff is the designated Army representative to the Joint Requirements Oversight Council (JROC).

If the chief of staff is incapacitated or otherwise relieved of duty, the vice chief of staff serves as the acting chief of staff. If both the chief of staff and the vice chief of staff were to be incapacitated, the senior-most general on the Army Staff would become the acting chief of staff of the Army until someone else is appointed.

== Appointment ==
The vice chief of staff of the Army is appointed by the president, by and with the advice and consent of the Senate, from among the general officers of the Army.

Unlike the chief of staff of the Army, there is no fixed term nor term limit to the position of the vice chief of staff, although most of those appointed to the office have typically served for two or three year tenures.

== List of vice chiefs of staff of the Army ==
No.	Portrait	Vice Chief of Staff	Took office	Left office	Time in office	Chief of Staff
1	J. Lawton Collins	General; J. Lawton Collins (1896–1987)	November 1, 1948	August 15, 1949 (became CSA)	287 days	Omar Bradley
2	Wade H. Haislip	General; Wade H. Haislip (1889–1971)	August 16, 1949	July 29, 1951 (retired)	1 year, 347 days	J. Lawton Collins
3	John E. Hull	General; John E. Hull (1895–1975)	July 30, 1951	August 14, 1953 (reassigned)	2 years, 15 days	J. Lawton Collins
4	Charles L. Bolte	General; Charles L. Bolte (1895–1989)	August 15, 1953	June 29, 1955 (retired)	1 year, 318 days	Matthew Ridgway
5	Williston B. Palmer	General; Williston B. Palmer (1899–1973)	June 30, 1955	May 31, 1957 (reassigned)	1 year, 335 days	Maxwell D. Taylor
6	Lyman L. Lemnitzer	General; Lyman L. Lemnitzer (1899–1988)	June 1, 1957	June 30, 1959 (became CSA)	2 years, 29 days	Maxwell D. Taylor
7	George H. Decker	General; George H. Decker (1902–1980)	July 1, 1959	September 29, 1960 (became CSA)	1 year, 90 days	Lyman Lemnitzer
8	Clyde D. Eddleman	General; Clyde D. Eddleman (1902–1992)	September 30, 1960	March 31, 1962 (retired)	1 year, 181 days	George Decker
9	Barksdale Hamlett	General; Barksdale Hamlett (1908–1979)	April 1, 1962	September 3, 1964 (retired)	2 years, 155 days	George Decker; Earle Wheeler; Harold K. Johnson
10	Creighton W. Abrams Jr.	General; Creighton W. Abrams Jr. (1914–1974)	September 4, 1964	April 30, 1967 (reassigned)	2 years, 238 days	Harold K. Johnson
11	Ralph E. Haines Jr.	General; Ralph E. Haines Jr. (1913–2011)	May 1, 1967	July 2, 1968 (reassigned)	1 year, 62 days	Harold K. Johnson
12	Bruce Palmer Jr.	General; Bruce Palmer Jr. (1913–2000)	July 3, 1968	January 4, 1973 (reassigned)	4 years, 185 days	William Westmoreland; Creighton Abrams
13	Alexander M. Haig Jr.	General; Alexander M. Haig Jr. (1924–2010)	January 4, 1973	May 4, 1973 (reassigned)	120 days	Creighton Abrams
14	Frederick C. Weyand	General; Frederick C. Weyand (1916–2010)	May 4, 1973	October 20, 1974 (became CSA)	1 year, 169 days	Creighton Abrams; Himself (acting)
15	Walter T. Kerwin Jr.	General; Walter T. Kerwin Jr. (1917–2008)	October 21, 1974	September 23, 1978 (retired)	3 years, 337 days	Frederick C. Weyand; Bernard W. Rogers
16	Frederick J. Kroesen	General; Frederick J. Kroesen (1923–2020)	October 26, 1978	October 7, 1979 (reassigned)	346 days	Bernard W. Rogers; Edward C. Meyer
17	John W. Vessey Jr.	General; John W. Vessey Jr. (1922–2016)	October 10, 1979	January 19, 1982 (became JCS chairman)	2 years, 101 days	Edward C. Meyer
18	John A. Wickham Jr.	General; John A. Wickham Jr. (1928–2024)	January 27, 1982	June 22, 1983 (became CSA)	1 year, 146 days	Edward C. Meyer
19	Maxwell R. Thurman	General; Maxwell R. Thurman (1931–1995)	August 26, 1983	February 4, 1987 (reassigned)	3 years, 162 days	John A. Wickham Jr.
20	Arthur E. Brown Jr.	General; Arthur E. Brown Jr. (born 1929)	February 15, 1987	January 20, 1989 (retired)	1 year, 340 days	John A. Wickham Jr. Carl E. Vuono
21	Robert W. RisCassi	General; Robert W. RisCassi (born 1936)	January 21, 1989	December 10, 1990 (reassigned)	1 year, 323 days	Carl E. Vuono
22	Gordon R. Sullivan	General; Gordon R. Sullivan (1937–2024)	December 17, 1990	June 20, 1991 (became CSA)	185 days	Carl E. Vuono
23	Dennis J. Reimer	General; Dennis J. Reimer (born 1939)	June 21, 1991	January 20, 1993 (reassigned)	1 year, 213 days	Gordon R. Sullivan
24	J. H. Binford Peay III	General; J. H. Binford Peay III (born 1940)	January 23, 1993	January 15, 1994 (reassigned)	357 days	Gordon R. Sullivan
25	John H. Tilelli Jr.	General; John H. Tilelli Jr. (born 1941)	January 20, 1994	January 2, 1995 (reassigned)	347 days	Gordon R. Sullivan
26	Ronald H. Griffith	General; Ronald H. Griffith (1936–2018)	January 26, 1995	July 20, 1997 (retired)	2 years, 175 days	Gordon R. Sullivan; Dennis Reimer
27	William W. Crouch	General; William W. Crouch (1941–2024)	August 6, 1997	November 22, 1998 (retired)	1 year, 108 days	Dennis Reimer
28	Eric K. Shinseki	General; Eric K. Shinseki (born 1942)	November 24, 1998	June 21, 1999 (became CSA)	209 days	Dennis Reimer
29	John M. Keane	General; John M. Keane (born 1943)	June 22, 1999	October 16, 2003 (retired)	4 years, 116 days	Eric Shinseki; Peter Schoomaker
30	George W. Casey Jr.	General; George W. Casey Jr. (born 1948)	October 17, 2003	July 23, 2004 (reassigned)	280 days	Peter Schoomaker
31	Richard A. Cody	General; Richard A. Cody (born 1950)	July 24, 2004	July 31, 2008 (retired)	4 years, 7 days	Peter Schoomaker; George W. Casey Jr.
32	Peter W. Chiarelli	General; Peter W. Chiarelli (born 1950)	August 4, 2008	January 31, 2012 (retired)	3 years, 180 days	George W. Casey Jr. Martin Dempsey; Raymond T. Odierno
33	Lloyd J. Austin III	General; Lloyd J. Austin III (born 1953)	January 31, 2012	March 8, 2013 (reassigned)	1 year, 36 days	Raymond T. Odierno
34	John F. Campbell	General; John F. Campbell (born 1957)	March 8, 2013	August 8, 2014 (reassigned)	1 year, 153 days	Raymond T. Odierno
35	Daniel B. Allyn	General; Daniel B. Allyn (born 1959)	August 15, 2014	June 16, 2017 (retired)	2 years, 305 days	Raymond T. Odierno; Mark A. Milley
36	James C. McConville	General; James C. McConville (born 1959)	June 16, 2017	July 26, 2019 (became CSA)	2 years, 40 days	Mark A. Milley
37	Joseph M. Martin	General; Joseph M. Martin (born 1962)	July 26, 2019	August 5, 2022 (retired)	3 years, 10 days	Mark A. Milley; James C. McConville
38	Randy A. George	General; Randy A. George (born 1964)	August 5, 2022	September 21, 2023 (became CSA)	1 year, 47 days	James C. McConville; Himself (acting)
39	James Mingus	General; James Mingus (born 1964)	January 5, 2024	February 6, 2026 (retired)	2 years, 32 days	Randy A. George
40	Christopher LaNeve	General; Christopher LaNeve (born 1967)	February 6, 2026	Incumbent	283 days	Randy A. George; Himself (acting)

== See also ==
- Sergeant Major of the Army
- Under Secretary of the Army
- Assistant Commandant of the Marine Corps (USMC counterpart)
- Vice Chief of Naval Operations (USN counterpart)
- Vice Chief of Staff of the Air Force (USAF counterpart)
- Vice Chief of Space Operations (USSF counterpart)
- Vice Commandant of the Coast Guard (USCG counterpart)
- Deputy Chief of Staff of the United States Army
