= Daniel B. Allyn =

United States Army general

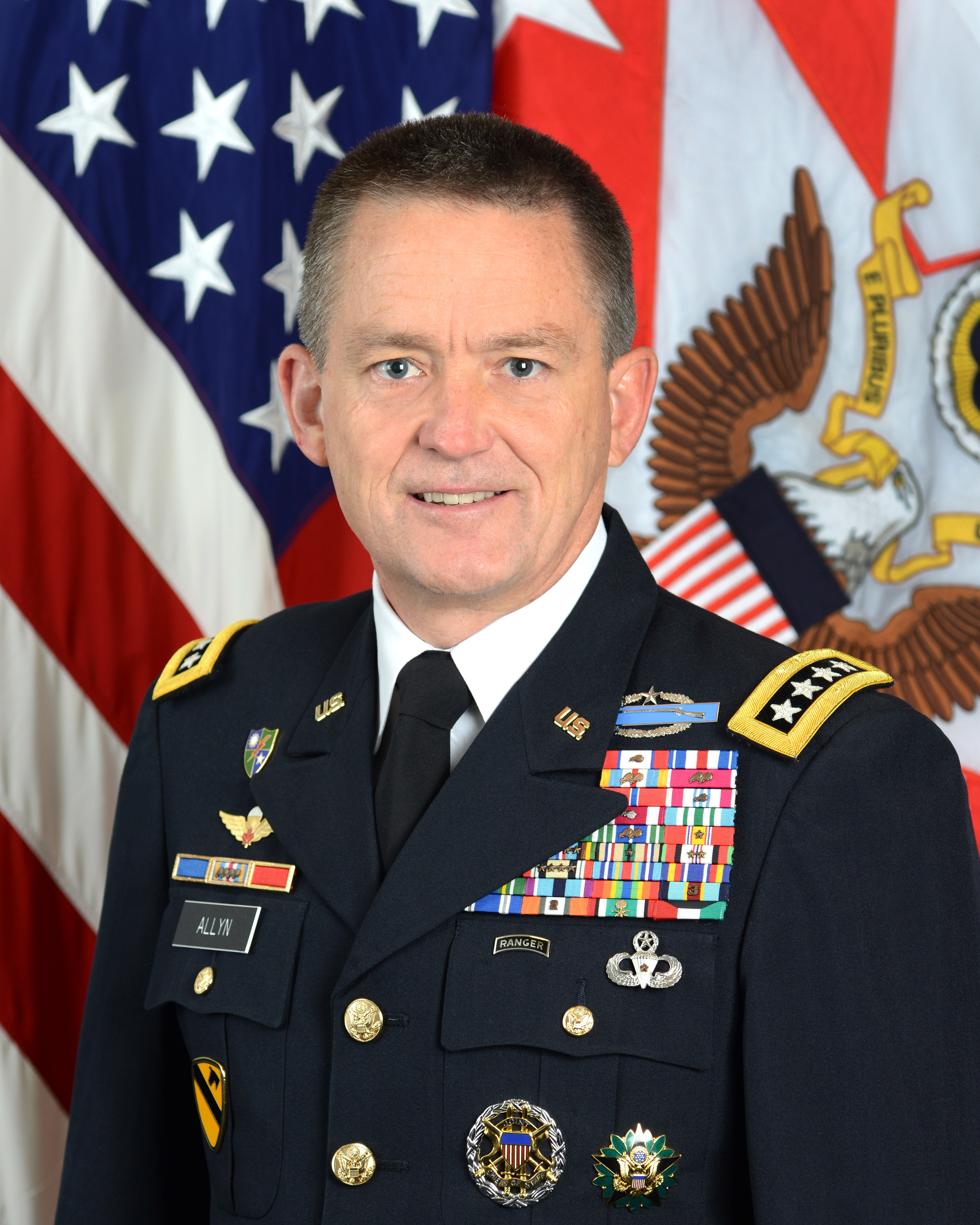
- Official portrait, 2014
- Born: 24 September 1959 (age 67); New Hampshire, United States
- Military career
- Allegiance: United States
- Branch: United States Army
- Service years: 1981–2017
- Rank: General
- Commands: Vice Chief of Staff of the United States Army; United States Army Forces Command; XVIII Airborne Corps; 1st Cavalry Division
- Conflicts: Operation Urgent Fury; Operation Just Cause; Gulf War; Operation Desert Spring; War in Afghanistan; Iraq War
- Awards: Army Distinguished Service Medal (3); Silver Star; Defense Superior Service Medal (3); Legion of Merit (3); Bronze Star Medal

Daniel Bartlett Allyn (born 24 Sep 1959) is a retired United States Army general who served as the 35th Vice Chief of Staff of the United States Army from 2014 until 2017. Allyn previously served as the commanding general of the XVIII Airborne Corps from 2012 to 2013 and of United States Army Forces Command from May 2013 to August 2014.

== Early life and education ==
Allyn was born in New Hampshire on 25 July 1959, and raised in Berwick, Maine. He graduated from the United States Military Academy at West Point, New York in 1981.

== Career ==
Allyn went on to serve overseas in South Korea, Grenada, Egypt, Panama, Saudi Arabia, Kuwait, Iraq and Afghanistan as a combat infantryman and a master parachutist.

== Awards and decorations ==
Combat Infantryman Badge with Star (denoting 2nd award)
Ranger tab
Master Combat Parachutist Badge with one bronze Jump Device
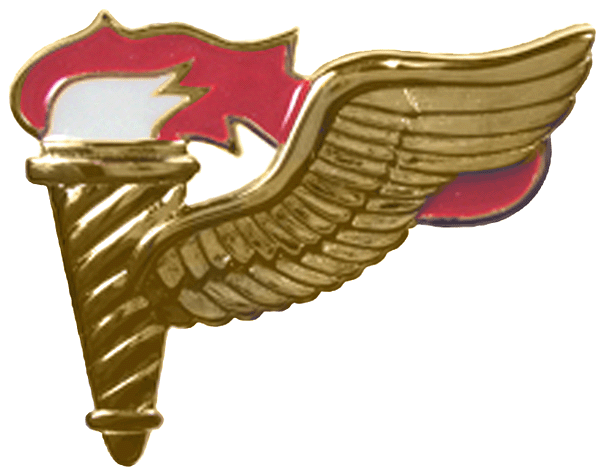
Pathfinder Badge
Joint Chiefs of Staff Identification Badge
Army Staff Identification Badge
Canadian Jump Wings (non-operational)
Italian Parachutist Badge
82nd Airborne Division Combat Service Identification Badge
75th Ranger Regiment Distinctive Unit Insignia
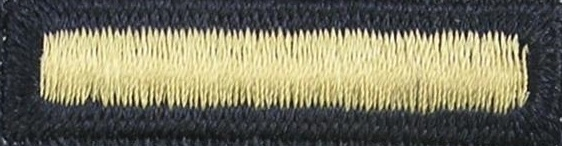
7 Overseas Service Bars

Army Distinguished Service Medal with two bronze oak leaf clusters
Silver Star
Defense Superior Service Medal with two bronze oak leaf clusters
Legion of Merit with two oak leaf clusters
Bronze Star Medal
Defense Meritorious Service Medal with oak leaf cluster
Meritorious Service Medal with silver oak leaf cluster
Joint Service Commendation Medal
Army Commendation Medal with three oak leaf clusters
Army Achievement Medal with two oak leaf clusters
Army Presidential Unit Citation
Joint Meritorious Unit Award with four oak leaf clusters
Meritorious Unit Commendation
National Defense Service Medal with one bronze service star
Armed Forces Expeditionary Medal with Arrowhead device and two service stars
Southwest Asia Service Medal with one bronze campaign star
Afghanistan Campaign Medal with two campaign stars
Iraq Campaign Medal with four campaign stars
Global War on Terrorism Expeditionary Medal
Global War on Terrorism Service Medal
Korea Defense Service Medal
Humanitarian Service Medal
Army Service Ribbon
Army Overseas Service Ribbon with bronze award numeral 3
NATO Medal for Service with ISAF
Multinational Force and Observers Medal with silver numeral 2
Kuwait Liberation Medal (Saudi Arabia)
Kuwait Liberation Medal (Kuwait)

=== Other ===
In 2013, Allyn was the honoree of the Patriot Foundation, an organization that provides scholarships and other support to the families of soldiers who have served in airborne, special operations and other army specialty units.

Military offices
Preceded by Frank Helmick	Commanding General, XVIII Airborne Corps; 2012–2013	Succeeded by Joseph Anderson
Preceded by David M. Rodriguez	Commanding General, United States Army Forces Command; 2013–2014	Succeeded by Mark A. Milley
Preceded by John F. Campbell	Vice Chief of Staff of the United States Army; 2014–2017	Succeeded by James C. McConville
