= Michael A. Bills =

American Army general

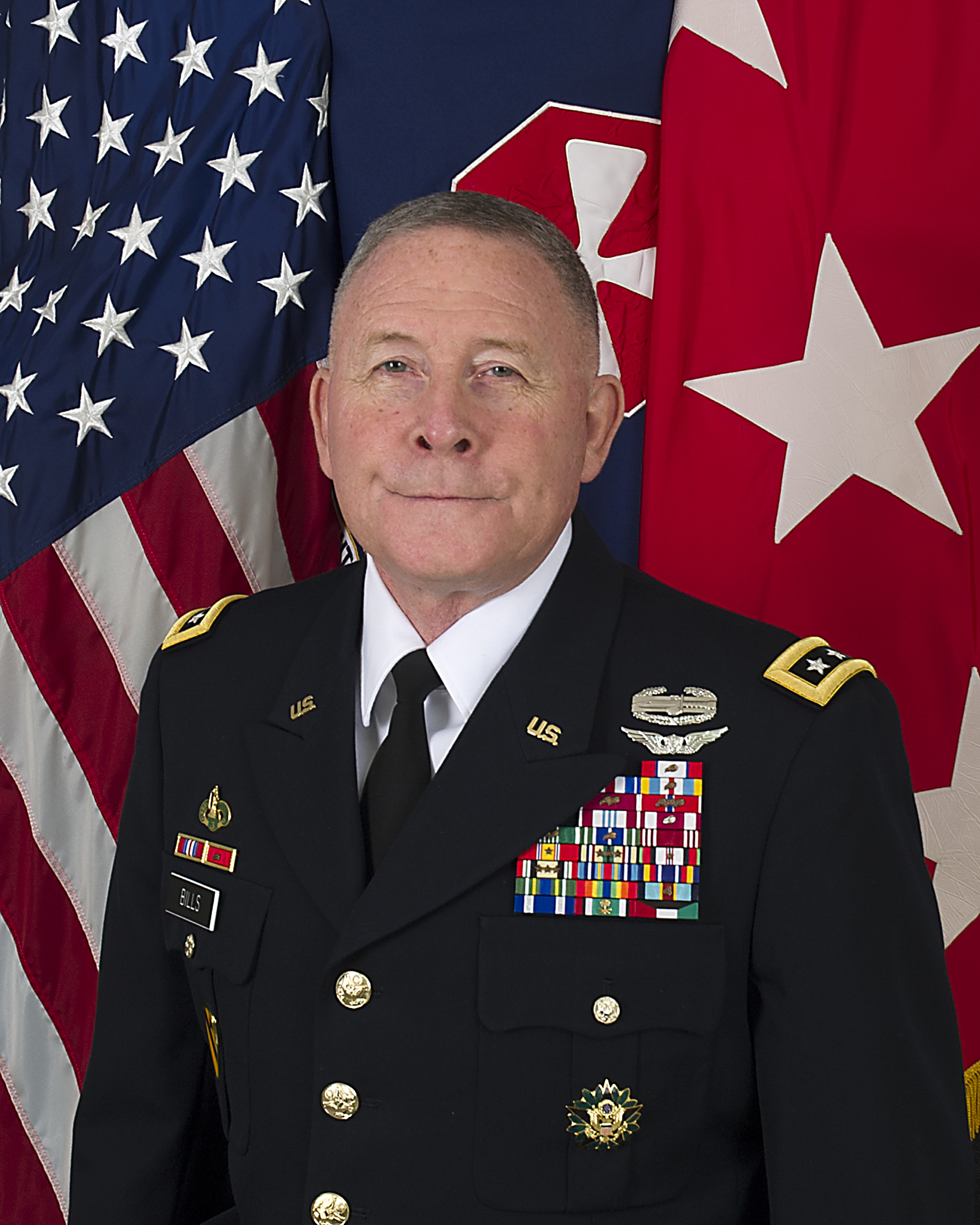
- Born: 1958 (age 67–68)
- Military career
- Allegiance: United States
- Branch: United States Army
- Service years: 1983–2020
- Rank: Lieutenant General
- Commands: Eighth United States Army; 1st Cavalry Division; Joint Task Force North; 3d Armored Cavalry Regiment
- Conflicts: Gulf War; Iraq War; War in Afghanistan
- Awards: Army Distinguished Service Medal (2); Silver Star; Defense Superior Service Medal (2); Legion of Merit (3); Bronze Star Medal (4)

Michael A. Bills (born 1958) is a retired lieutenant general in the United States Army, who last served as the Commanding General of the Eighth United States Army from January 2018 until his retirement in October 2020.

== Military career ==
Bills was commissioned in December 1983, through ROTC at George Mason University as a second lieutenant in the Armor Branch with Bachelor of Arts in sociology. From 1984 to 1987, Bills served as a tank platoon leader, scout platoon leader, Executive Officer, and maintenance officer in the 2nd Battalion, 81st Armor Regiment. He then went to Fort Riley, Kansas to serve in 1st Squadron, 4th Cavalry as the Squadron S1 and then Provisional Commander Headquarters and Headquarters Troop. Later, Bills commanded B Troop of 1-4 CAV and deployed to Saudi Arabia in support of Operation Desert Storm.

Bills was the commander of 1st Squadron, 1st Cavalry Regiment in Büdingen, Germany during the September 11th attacks. Following his command of 1st Squadron, he served in the Combat Maneuver Training Center in Germany and deployed to Operation Iraqi Freedom as part of the V Corps Commander's Assault command post staff.

In 2006, Bills took command of the 3rd Armored Cavalry Regiment again deploying as part of Operation Iragi Freedom. He then served as the Commander of Joint Task Force North, USNORTHCOM at Fort Bliss, Texas before moving on to serve as the Deputy Chief of Staff, G-3, United States Army Europe.

Bills was Fort Carson's acting senior commander and as the Deputy Commanding General of 4th Infantry Division from June 2013 to July 2014. In March 2014, Bills became the commander of 1st Cavalry Division in Fort Hood, Texas, deploying to Afghanistan in support of Operation Enduring Freedom.

In 2016, Bills became the United States Forces Korea's assistant chief of staff of operations. Bills took command of the Eighth United States Army in January 2018. He retired on October 2, 2020.

=== Awards and decorations ===
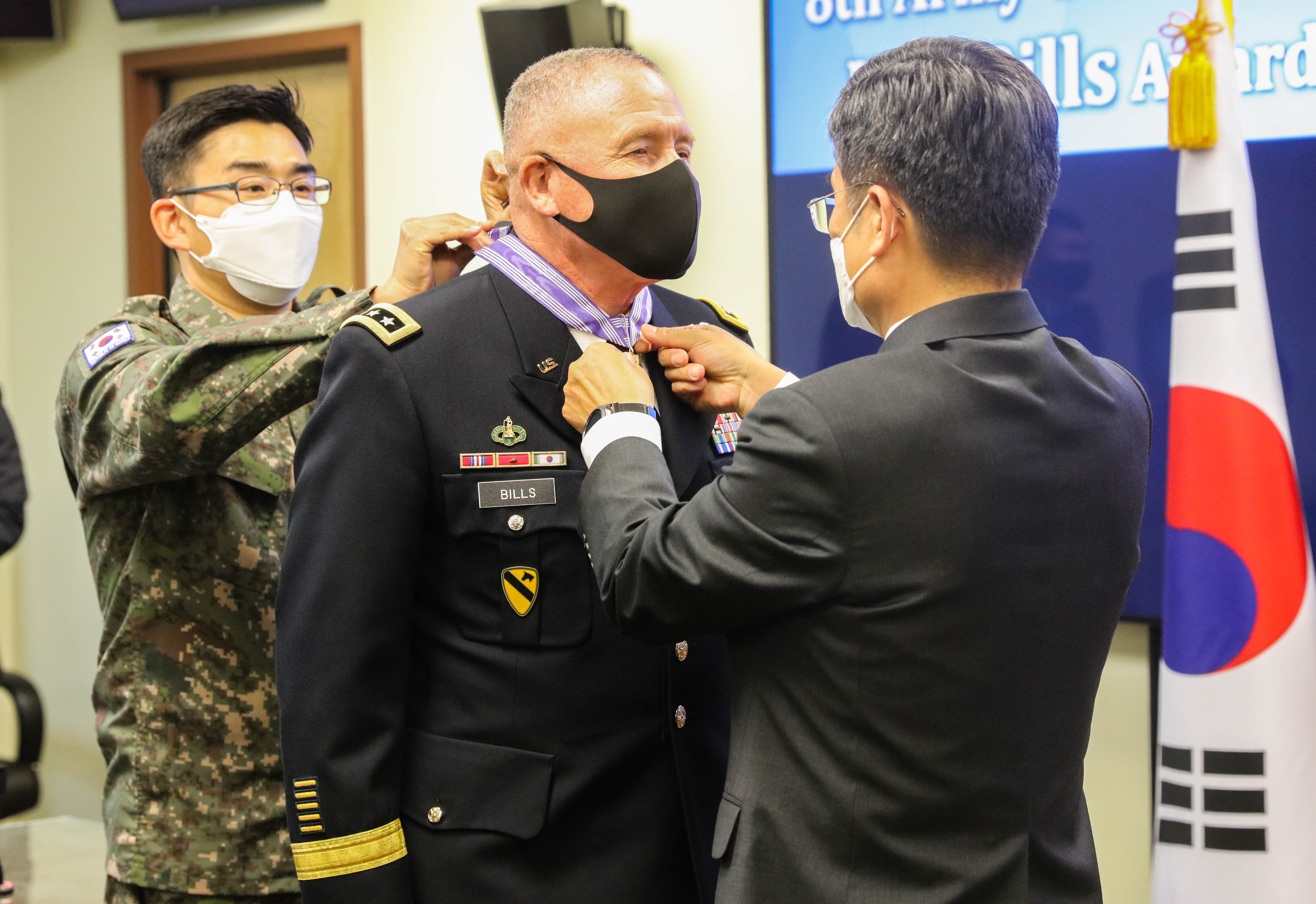
Bills receives the Order of National Security Merit by Republic of Korea Minister of National Defense Suh Wook in 2020

- Army Distinguished Service Medal with oak leaf cluster
- Silver Star
- Defense Superior Service Medal with oak leaf cluster
- Legion of Merit with two oak leaf clusters
- Bronze Star Medal with three oak leaf clusters
- Defense Meritorious Service Medal
- Meritorious Service Medal with silver oak leaf cluster
- Army Commendation Medal with three oak leaf clusters
- Army Achievement Medal with oak leaf cluster

== Personal life ==
Bills is a native of New York. He is married to Megan. They have three sons, Michael, Matthew, and Marc.

Military offices
Preceded by Anthony R. Ierardi	Commanding General of the 1st Cavalry Division; 2014–2016	Succeeded by John C. Thomson III
Preceded by Thomas S. Vandal	Assistant Chief of Staff for Operations of the United Nations Command, ROK/US Combined Forces Command, and United States Forces Korea; 2016–2017	Succeeded by Thomas S. James Jr.
Preceded by Thomas S. Vandal	Commanding General of the Eighth United States Army and Chief of Staff of the ROK/US Combined Forces Command; 2018–2020	Succeeded by Willard Burleson
