= Paul T. Calvert =

U.S. Army general

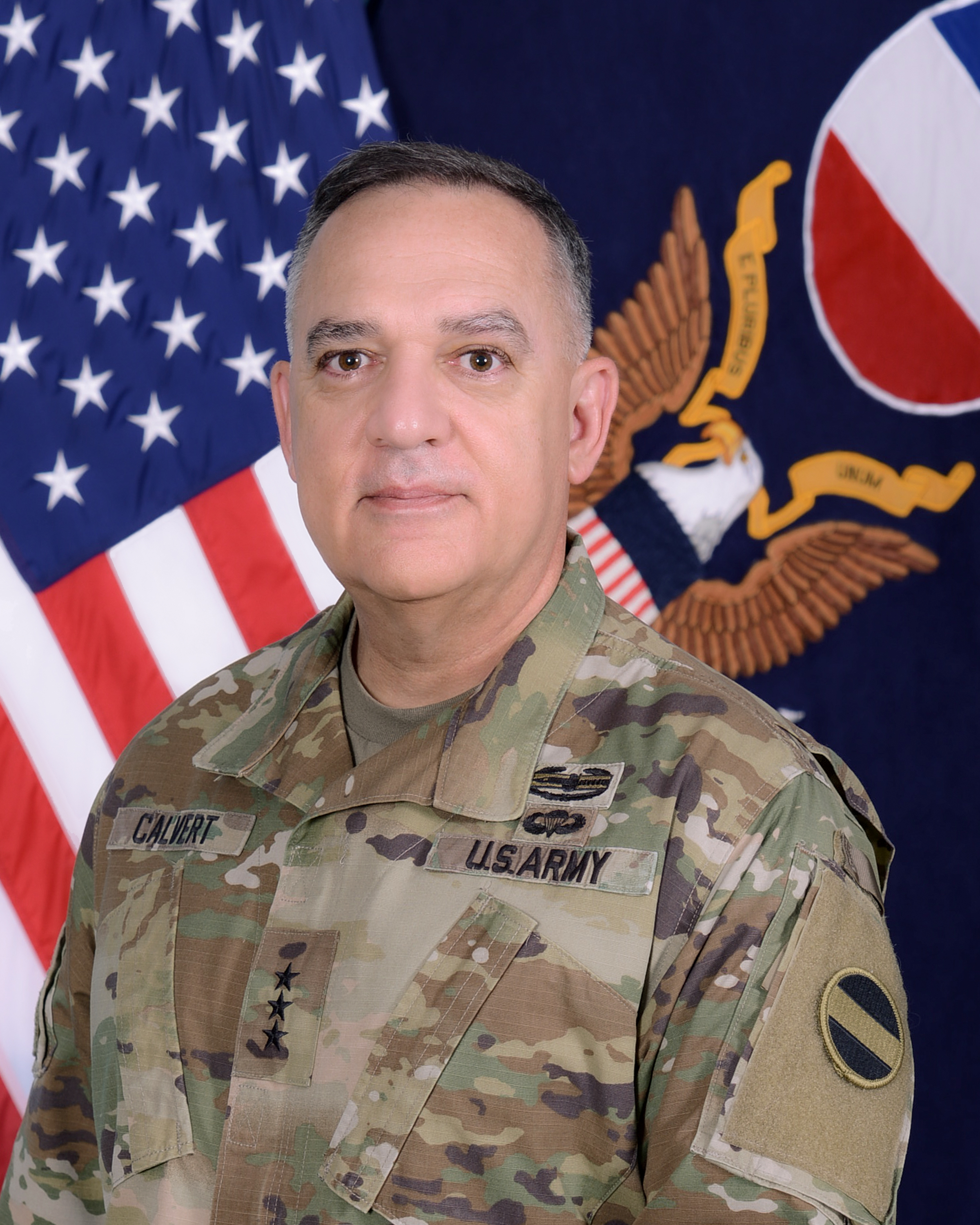
- Military career
- Allegiance: United States
- Branch: United States Army
- Service years: 1987–2024
- Rank: Lieutenant General
- Commands: Combined Joint Task Force – Operation Inherent Resolve; 1st Cavalry Division; Train Advise Assist Command – East; 2nd Brigade Combat Team, 1st Infantry Division
- Conflicts: Gulf War; Iraq War; Operation Inherent Resolve
- Awards: Legion of Merit; Bronze Star Medal (5)

Paul T. Calvert is a retired United States Army lieutenant general who last served as the deputy commanding general and chief of staff of the United States Army Forces Command from 2021 to 2024. He received a Bachelor's degree from the University of North Georgia and a Master's degree in National Security Strategy from the Air University at Maxwell Air Force Base. He was commissioned in 1987 as an armor officer. He served as the Commander of the Combined Joint Task Force – Operation Inherent Resolve from 2020 to 2021. Previously, he was the Assistant Deputy Chief of Staff for Operations, Plans, and Training of the United States Army.

Military offices
Preceded by John C. Thomson III	Commander of the 1st Cavalry Division; 2017–2019	Succeeded by Jeffery D. Broadwater
Preceded by Charles A. Flynn	Assistant Deputy Chief of Staff for Operations, Plans, and Training of the United States Army; 2019–2020	Succeeded by Sean Swindell
Preceded by Robert P. White	Commander of the Combined Joint Task Force – Operation Inherent Resolve; 2020–2021	Succeeded by John W. Brennan
Preceded by Leopoldo A. Quintas Jr.	Deputy Commanding General and Chief of Staff of the United States Army Forces Command; 2021–2024	Succeeded by Stephen G. Smith
