= Magnatag =

Magnatag Visible Systems
- Industry: Non-digital Information Display Products
- Founded: 1967
- Founder: Wallace A. Krapf
- Headquarters: Macedon, New York, U.S.
- Key people: Wallace Krapf (1967-2007) Robert W. Mixon, Jr (2007-2009) Christian Q. Krapf. (2009-Present)
- Number of employees: 70
- Website: www.magnatag.com

Magnatag Visible Systems is a family-owned company founded in 1967 and based in Macedon, New York, United States. Magnatag manufactures and sells customized magnetic whiteboard systems.

The company was founded in 1967 by Wallace A. Krapf under the title, Krapf Business Systems Inc. Previously, while working at a large Rochester, New York stationery company, Krapf began combining supplies and offering them to his customers as an organizational solution to their specific information display problems. Krapf then went on to invent a write-on shelf tag magnet—which he dubbed "Magnatag"— that came in a wide array of colors for color-coding and communicating information. As a result of the product's popularity, Krapf began developing and standardizing magnetic chalkboard display systems to offer as ready-to-use kits.

In the 1980s, Krapf began operating under the Magnatag brand. The company then began to produce organizational whiteboards utilizing a material dubbed, "Magnalux", creating a porcelain-like dry erase surface that could easily be printed on. Currently Magnatag specializes in producing task-specific whiteboards and organizational magnetic dry erase kits.

In October 2007, Robert W. Mixon, Jr took over as president of Magnatag Visible Solutions. Mixon left the company in 2009 after his contract expired. He was replaced later that year by Wallace's son, Christian Krapf.
