= Randy George =

American general (born 1964)

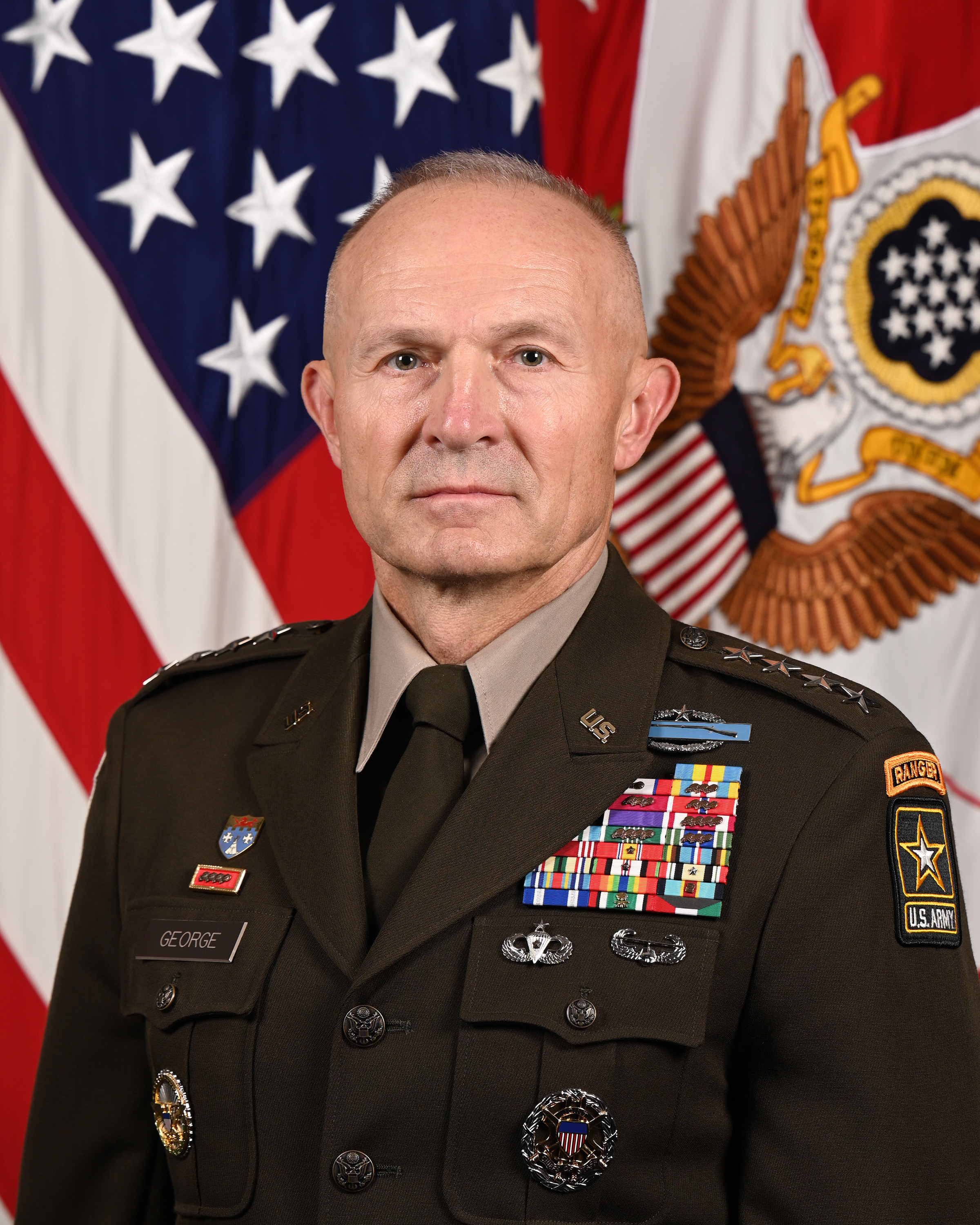
- Official portrait, 2023
- Born: Randy Alan George; 1 November 1964 (age 61); Alden, Iowa, U.S.
- Education: United States Military Academy (BS); Colorado School of Mines (MA); Naval War College (MS)
- Military career
- Allegiance: United States
- Branch: United States Army
- Service years: 1982–2026
- Rank: General
- Commands: Chief of Staff of the United States Army; Vice Chief of Staff of the United States Army; I Corps; 4th Infantry Division; 4th Infantry Brigade Combat Team, 4th Infantry Division; 1st Battalion, 187th Infantry Regiment
- Conflicts: Gulf War; Iraq War; War in Afghanistan
- Awards: Defense Distinguished Service Medal; Army Distinguished Service Medal (2); Defense Superior Service Medal (4); Legion of Merit (4); Bronze Star (4); Purple Heart
- George's voice George's confirmation hearing opening statement for Army chief of staff. Recorded 12 July 2023

Randy Alan George (born 1 November 1964) is a retired American general who served as the 41st chief of staff of the United States Army from 2023 to 2026. He also served as the 38th vice chief of staff of the Army from 2022 to 2023, and the senior military assistant to the United States secretary of defense, Lloyd Austin, from 2021 to 2022.

Born and raised in Iowa, George enlisted in the United States Army in 1982, before entering the United States Military Academy at West Point in 1984. He was commissioned in 1988 as an Infantry officer and was deployed to Iraq and Afghanistan multiple times during his career. George served in the 101st Airborne Division during the Gulf War, commanded the 173rd Airborne Brigade during the Iraq War, and commanded the 4th Brigade Combat Team during the war in Afghanistan. He then held staff positions on the Army Staff and the Joint Staff before commanding the 4th Infantry Division from 2017 to 2019, during which time he deployed to Afghanistan again. George was later the commanding general of I Corps from 2020 to 2021.

As the Army chief of staff, he oversaw the implementation of several measures related to the Army Transformation Initiative.

== Early life and education ==
Born on 1 November 1964 and raised in Alden, Iowa, Randy Alan George is the son of Robert and Lorraine George. He served as an enlisted soldier in the United States Army from 1982 before beginning attendance at the United States Military Academy at West Point, New York, in 1984. George graduated with a Bachelor of Science degree in engineering in 1988. He later received a master's degree in economics from the Colorado School of Mines and a master's in international security studies from the Naval War College, and is also a graduate of the United States Army Command and General Staff College.

== Army career ==
George commissioned from the U.S. Military Academy in 1988 as an infantry officer. He served as a lieutenant in the 101st Airborne Division and deployed in support of Desert Shield/Desert Storm. He had the roles of platoon leader, company executive officer (Desert Shield/Storm), scout platoon leader (3d Battalion, 327th Infantry), aide-de-camp and battalion S3-Air (3d Battalion, 187th Infantry).

Following the Armor Officer Advanced Course in 1993, George was stationed at Fort Carson where he was the assistant operations officer for 3rd Brigade, 4th Infantry Division and then commanded C Company and later Headquarters Company in 1st Battalion, 8th Infantry Regiment. After that assignment he attended the Colorado School of Mines, and later held a position at the Tactical Directorate, National Simulation Center, Fort Leavenworth.

After attending the Army Command and General Staff College at Fort Leavenworth, in 2001 George went to Italy and served as the executive officer of 2nd Battalion, 503rd Infantry Regiment, 173rd Airborne Brigade. He was later executive officer and then deputy commander of the brigade, during which time he deployed in support of Operation Iraqi Freedom in 2003, in Kirkuk, Iraq.

Returning to the 101st Airborne Division in 2004, George commanded 1st Battalion, 187th Infantry Regiment and deployed a second time to Iraq from 2005 to 2006. He then went to United States Naval War College as an instructor of joint military operations and then as a student. He deployed again as part of the initiatives group for the commanding general, Multi-National Corps-Iraq in 2007, in Baghdad.

In 2008 George returned to the 4th Infantry Division, where he commanded 4th Brigade Combat Team and deployed to Afghanistan in support of Operation Enduring Freedom from 2009 to 2010. Following command, he was a fellow on the Council of Foreign Relations, chief of the strategic policy division for the Pakistan-Afghanistan coordination cell on the Joint Staff, executive officer to the 33rd Vice Chief of Staff of the Army, General Lloyd Austin, and then executive assistant to the commander of U.S. Central Command, the latter starting in March 2013. He then returned to Fort Carson as the deputy commanding general (maneuver) of 4th Infantry Division in July 2014.

After two staff assignments as the director of force management for the Army (G-3/5/7) from May 2015 to June 2016, and deputy director for regional operations and force management on the Joint Staff (J-3) from June 2016 to August 2017, George took command of the 4th Infantry Division. In this role he deployed again to Afghanistan for nine months, where he served as deputy chief of staff for operations of the Resolute Support Mission. After relinquishing command in October 2019, he was briefly a special assistant to the vice chief of staff of the Army.

George's most recent command was of I Corps at Joint Base Lewis McChord, taking command in February 2020 and serving in that role during the COVID-19 pandemic in the United States. In May 2021, George took up the post of Senior Military Assistant to the Secretary of Defense under Secretary Lloyd Austin. On 5 August 2022, he assumed the duties of the vice chief of staff of the United States Army.

=== Chief of staff ===
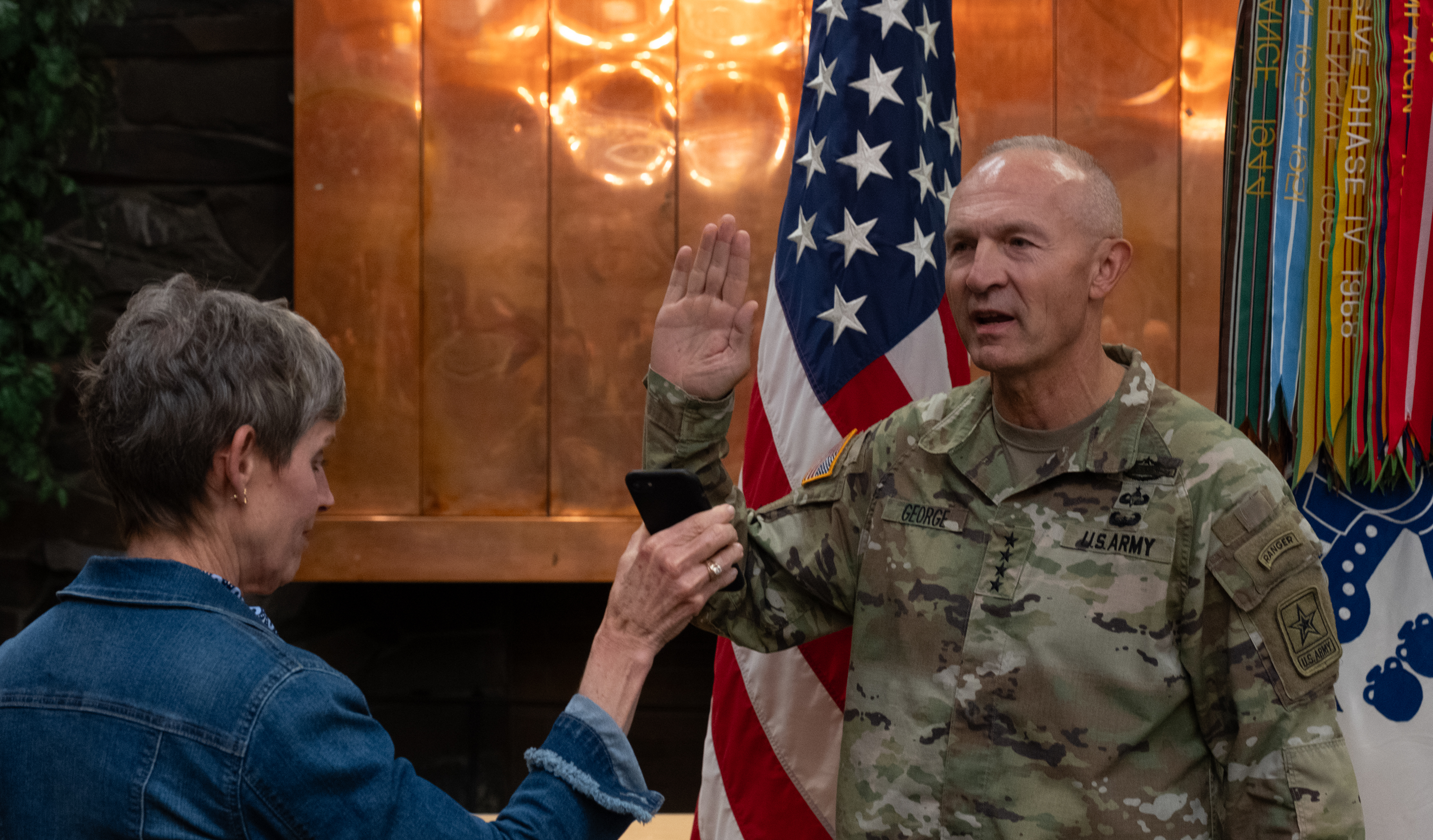
George is sworn in as the 41st chief of staff of the Army on 21 September 2023.

He served in an acting capacity as the chief of staff of the United States Army from 4 August 2023. George's nomination to be Army chief of staff was among those delayed by Senator Tommy Tuberville's hold over opposition to the Defense Department's abortion policy. Having been confirmed via standalone vote on 21 September 2023, George was sworn in on the same day via phone by Secretary of the Army Christine Wormuth while visiting soldiers of the 11th Airborne Division in Alaska.

After becoming the chief of staff he said his top priorities were preparing the Army to fight future conflicts, strengthening the Army profession, and improving recruitment. Initiatives undertaken for the former include improving the Army's ability to counter drone warfare, increasing the range and accuracy of long-range weapon systems, and ensuring that the U.S. industrial base can meet the needs of the Army. In 2024, he decided to cut 5% of the general officer positions in the Army by declining to fill 12 of the total of 219 positions in the next several years, which were deemed "non-essential." At Army headquarters, it was decided to reduce its size by 1,000 personnel. George also led the Army out of one of the worst recruiting crises in its history in 2024.

On 1 May 2025, George and Army Secretary Daniel Driscoll announced the Army Transformation Initiative, a project to restructure the Army, reduce inefficiency, and quickly incorporate new technologies, as part of a larger effort consistent with a directive from Defense Secretary Pete Hegseth. Described as the Army's biggest restructuring in a generation, among its changes are the creation of transformation-in-contact brigades and plans to merge several existing Army commands. The first phase of the initiative took place during 2024, when three Army brigades started experimentation with new technology and structures as transformation-in-contact brigades. This was intended to assist the Army's adoption of drones and other systems that have been widely used in the Russo-Ukrainian war. George also ended the Army's acquisition of the M10 Booker, after it was determined to be too easy to destroy with drones, and accelerated the development of the M1E3 Abrams and the acquisition of the Infantry Squad Vehicle.

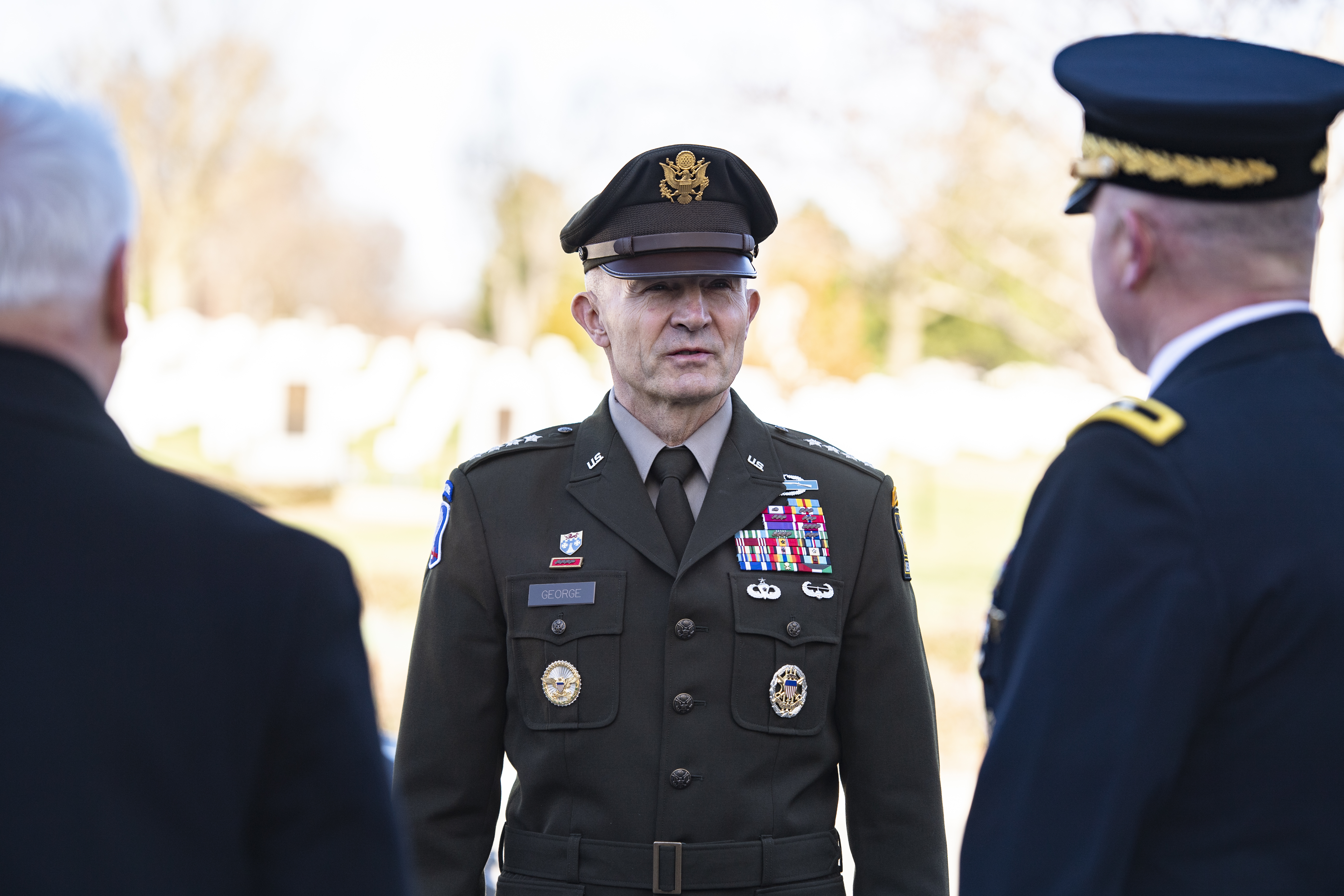
George at the Tomb of the Unknown Soldier in Arlington, Virginia, in March 2024.

George was involved in the planning of the U.S. Army 250th Anniversary Parade, held on 14 June 2025. In October 2025, the Army combined Training and Doctrine Command with Futures Command, to create Army Transformation and Training Command. George also announced that Forces Command will be merged with U.S. Army North and U.S. Army South to form a Western Hemisphere Command before the end of the year, as an effort to reduce the size of headquarters.

In November 2025, George was part of a delegation of senior Army officials that were led by Secretary Daniel Driscoll to Ukraine, where they met with Ukrainian leaders to discuss the peace negotiations in the Russo-Ukrainian war. On 5 December 2025 he spoke at the activation ceremony of the United States Army Western Hemisphere Command, where he passed the colors to its first commanding general. After the start of the United States war against Iran on 28 February 2026, George worked to get additional personnel and air defense assets to the Middle East.

On 2 April 2026, Hegseth asked George to leave his post and retire a year and half before the completion of what is typically a four-year term. George's retirement was "effective immediately", according to a Pentagon spokesman. His official retirement ceremony was held on 24 April. Hegseth's decision was reportedly due to George's close partnership with Army Secretary Driscoll and disagreements over the promotion of senior Army officers. The vice chief, Christopher LaNeve, became acting chief of staff after George's removal. Sources familiar with the matter told The Washington Post that days before his firing, George was troubled by a discussion with LaNeve, who had relayed that Hegseth wanted George stop the military’s procedural investigation into an unauthorized helicopter flyby of Kid Rock's home.

== Awards and decorations ==
Personal decorations
	Defense Distinguished Service Medal
	Army Distinguished Service Medal with oak leaf cluster
	Defense Superior Service Medal with three bronze oak leaf clusters
	Legion of Merit with three oak leaf clusters
Width-44 scarlet ribbon with width-4 ultramarine blue stripe at center, surrounded by width-1 white stripes. Width-1 white stripes are at the edges.	Bronze Star Medal with three oak leaf clusters
	Purple Heart
	Meritorious Service Medal with four oak leaf clusters
	Joint Service Commendation Medal
	Army Commendation Medal with four oak leaf clusters
	Army Achievement Medal with three oak leaf clusters
	Army Good Conduct Medal
Unit awards
	Meritorious Unit Commendation with four oak leaf clusters
Campaign and service medals
	National Defense Service Medal with one bronze service star
	Armed Forces Expeditionary Medal
	Southwest Asia Service Medal
	Afghanistan Campaign Medal with campaign star
	Iraq Campaign Medal with silver campaign star
	Global War on Terrorism Expeditionary Medal
Service, training, and marksmanship awards
	Army Service Ribbon
	Army Overseas Service Ribbon (with award numeral 2)
Foreign awards
	NATO Medal for Service with ISAF
	Kuwait Liberation Medal (Saudi Arabia)
	Kuwait Liberation Medal (Kuwait)
	Honorary Member of the Order of Australia (Australia)
	Officer of the Legion of Honour (France)

Other accoutrements
Master Combat Infantryman Badge with Star (denoting 2nd award)
Senior Parachutist Badge with bronze combat jump device
Ranger tab
Air Assault Badge
Joint Chiefs of Staff Identification Badge
Office of the Secretary of Defense Identification Badge
4th Infantry Division Combat Service Identification Badge
12th Infantry Regiment Distinctive Unit Insignia
9 Overseas Service Bars

== Dates of promotion ==
Rank	Branch	Date
Second lieutenant	Army	1988
First lieutenant	Army	1988
Captain	Army	1993
Major	Army	26 September 1997
Lieutenant colonel	Army	18 September 2002
Colonel	Army	26 January 2007
Brigadier general	Army	2 April 2014
Major general	Army	2 January 2017
Lieutenant general	Army	4 February 2020
General	Army	5 January 2022

== Personal life ==
He has been married to his wife, Patty George, since 1989, and they have two children.

Military offices
Preceded by Ryan Gonsalves	Commanding General of the 4th Infantry Division; 2017–2019	Succeeded by Matthew W. McFarlane
Preceded by Gary J. Volesky	Commanding General of I Corps; 2020–2021	Succeeded by Xavier T. Brunson
Preceded by Bryan P. Fenton	Senior Military Assistant to the Secretary of Defense; 2021–2022	Succeeded by Ronald P. Clark
Preceded by Joseph M. Martin	Vice Chief of Staff of the United States Army; 2022–2023	Succeeded by James Mingus
Preceded by James C. McConville	Chief of Staff of the United States Army; 2023–2026	Succeeded by Christopher LaNeve; Acting
Order of precedence
Preceded by B. Chance Saltzman as Chief of Space Operations	Order of precedence of the United States as Chief of Staff of the Army	Succeeded by Eric Smith as Commandant of the Marine Corps
