= James Mingus =

Retired American general (born 1964)

James J. Mingus
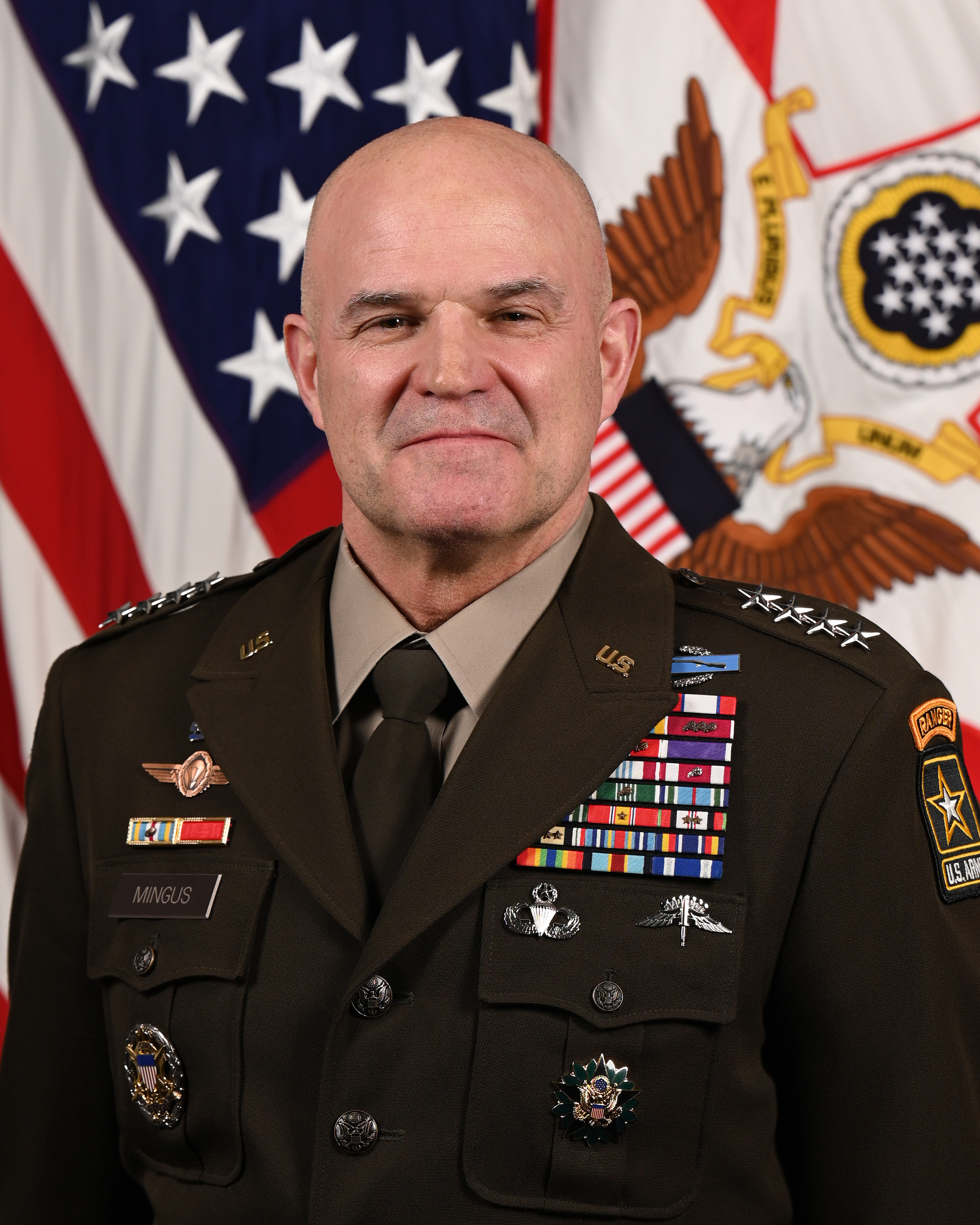
- Official portrait, 2024
- Born: 1964 (age 61–62); Spencer, Iowa, U.S.
- Education: Winona State University; United States Army Command and General Staff College; United States Army War College
- Military career
- Allegiance: United States
- Branch: United States Army
- Service years: 1981–2026
- Rank: General
- Commands: Vice Chief of Staff of the United States Army; 82nd Airborne Division; 4th Brigade Combat Team, 4th Infantry Division; Regimental Special Troops Battalion, 75th Ranger Regiment; 4th Ranger Training Battalion
- Conflicts: War in Afghanistan; Iraq War
- Awards: Army Distinguished Service Medal; Defense Superior Service Medal; Legion of Merit (3); Bronze Star Medal (5) Purple Heart

James J. Mingus (born 1964) is a retired American general who last served as the 39th vice chief of staff of the United States Army from 2024 to 2026.

A native of Iowa, he enlisted in the Iowa Army National Guard in 1981 before being commissioned from Winona State University's Army Reserve Officers' Training Corps in 1985. He later served in the 75th Ranger Regiment. Mingus has had multiple deployments to Iraq and Afghanistan during his career. His commands included the 4th Brigade Combat Team from 2010 to 2013 and the 82nd Airborne Division from 2018 to 2020. Mingus then served on the Joint Staff, including as director of operations from 2020 to 2022, and as director of the Joint Staff from 2022 to 2024.

== Early life and education ==
A native of Spencer, Iowa, he enlisted in the Iowa Army National Guard in 1981 and was commissioned in 1985 through the Army Reserve Officers' Training Corps while he was studying at Winona State University. Mingus was commissioned as a second lieutenant in the United States Army's Field Artillery branch, and later became an infantryman in 1987, when he began active duty. He also later graduated from the U.S. Army Command and General Staff College and the U.S. Army War College.

== Army career ==
In March 1988 he received his first assignment as a platoon leader in 2nd Battalion, 20th Infantry Regiment, 3rd Infantry Division, in Germany. Between then and April 1992 he also served as a battalion executive officer and maintenance officer. After that, until August 1997 Mingus had several roles in the 82nd Airborne Division at Fort Bragg, North Carolina, including as a company commander in the 505th Parachute Infantry Regiment; commander of the division's long range surveillance company; and as aide-de-camp to the division commanding general. From 1997 to 2000 he was an assistant professor of military science at the University of Tennessee–Knoxville and then studied at the U.S. Army Command and General Staff College.

From 2000 to 2003 he served in the 1st Battalion of the 75th Ranger Regiment, including as a liaison officer and operations officer. After that Mingus was made the chief of the Joint Planning Group, Joint Special Operations Command, Fort Bragg. In 2005 he assumed command of the 4th Ranger Training Battalion, Ranger Training Brigade, and in July 2007 he assumed command of the Regimental Special Troops, 75th Ranger Regiment.

In August 2009 he began his studies at the U.S. Army War College in Carlisle, Pennsylvania, before taking command of the 4th Brigade Combat Team, 4th Infantry Division, at Fort Carson, Colorado, in 2010. In that role, Mingus led the brigade combat team in a deployment to Afghanistan. During that deployment, the head of Mingus' personal security, Captain Florent Groberg, was awarded the Medal of Honor for stopping a suicide bomber from attacking Mingus and several Afghan officials that he was meeting with. Mingus was deployed to Iraq and Afghanistan a total of twelve times during his career.

He remained at the 4th Brigade Combat Team until March 2013, when he was made the head of the Commander's Action Group of the United States Central Command at MacDill Air Force Base, Florida. After a year in that role Mingus became the head of the Special Plans Working Group. In September 2015 he returned to the 4th Infantry Division to serve as its deputy commanding general (maneuver). He then took command of the Mission Command Center of Excellence of the United States Army Combined Arms Center in August 2016. Mingus became the commander of the 82nd Airborne Division at Fort Bragg in 2018, and was later assigned to the Joint Staff at The Pentagon to serve as director for operations (J3) in September 2020. He served as director of operations until June 2022.

In June 2022 he took up the post of director of the Joint Staff. In July 2023, Mingus was nominated for promotion to four-star general and assignment as vice chief of staff of the United States Army. His tenure as the 39th vice chief of staff of the Army began on 4 January 2024, when he was sworn in by the chief of staff, General Randy George. As the vice chief Mingus has been a contributor to the implementation of the Army Transformation Initiative, a program that includes incorporating new technology into the Army. In April 2025, it was reported that Mingus had been expected to become the next commander of the United States Central Command, but the Donald Trump administration instead chose the admiral Brad Cooper for the role. In October 2025, it was announced that Donald Trump nominated Christopher LaNeve to replace Mingus as the vice chief, even though he is less than two years into his term. He relinquished the post to LaNeve and retired on 6 February 2026.

== Awards and decorations ==
Mingus was awarded the following decorations during his military career:

Badge	Combat Infantryman Badge		
1st row	Army Distinguished Service Medal	Defense Superior Service Medal	Legion of Merit with 3 Oak leaf clusters
2nd row	Bronze Star with 1 silver Oak leaf cluster	Purple Heart	Defense Meritorious Service Medal
3rd row	Meritorious Service Medal with 1 silver Oak leaf cluster	Joint Service Commendation Medal	Army Commendation Medal with 1 bronze Oak leaf cluster
4th row	Joint Service Achievement Medal	Achievement Medal with 4 bronze Campaign stars	National Defense Service Medal with 1 Service star
5th row	Afghanistan Campaign Medal with 2 bronze Campaign stars	Iraq Campaign Medal with 3 bronze Campaign stars	Global War on Terrorism Expeditionary Medal
6th row	Global War on Terrorism Service Medal	Army Service Ribbon	Army Overseas Service Ribbon
7th row	NATO Medal for service with ISAF	Joint Meritorious Unit Award with 1 bronze Oak leaf cluster	Meritorious Unit Commendation
Badges	Ranger Tab	Military Freefall Parachutist Badge	Master Parachutist Badge

Other accoutrements
4th Infantry Division Distinctive unit insignia
75th Ranger Regiment
German Bronze Parachutist Badge
10 Overseas Service Bars

== Dates of promotion ==
Rank	Branch	Date
Brigadier general	Army	2 November 2014
Major general	Army	2 August 2017
Lieutenant general	Army	1 October 2020
General	Army	4 January 2024

Military offices
Preceded by Willard Burleson	Deputy Director of Strategy, Plans, and Policy of the United States Central Command; 2014–2015	Succeeded by Bradley Gericke
Preceded by Randy George	Deputy Commanding General (Maneuver) of the 4th Infantry Division; 2015–2016	Succeeded by Chris Donahue
Preceded by Willard Burleson	Director of the Mission Command Center of Excellence of the United States Army Combined Arms Center; 2016–2018	Succeeded by Douglas C. Crissman
Preceded by Michael Kurilla	Commanding General of the 82nd Airborne Division; 2018–2020	Succeeded by Chris Donahue
Preceded by Andrew Poppas	Director for Operations of the Joint Staff; 2020–2022	Succeeded by Douglas Sims
Preceded by Andrew Poppas	Director of the Joint Staff; 2022–2024	Succeeded by Douglas Sims
Preceded by Randy George	Vice Chief of Staff of the United States Army; 2024–2026	Succeeded by Christopher LaNeve
