= Arthur E. Brown Jr. =

American general (born 1929)

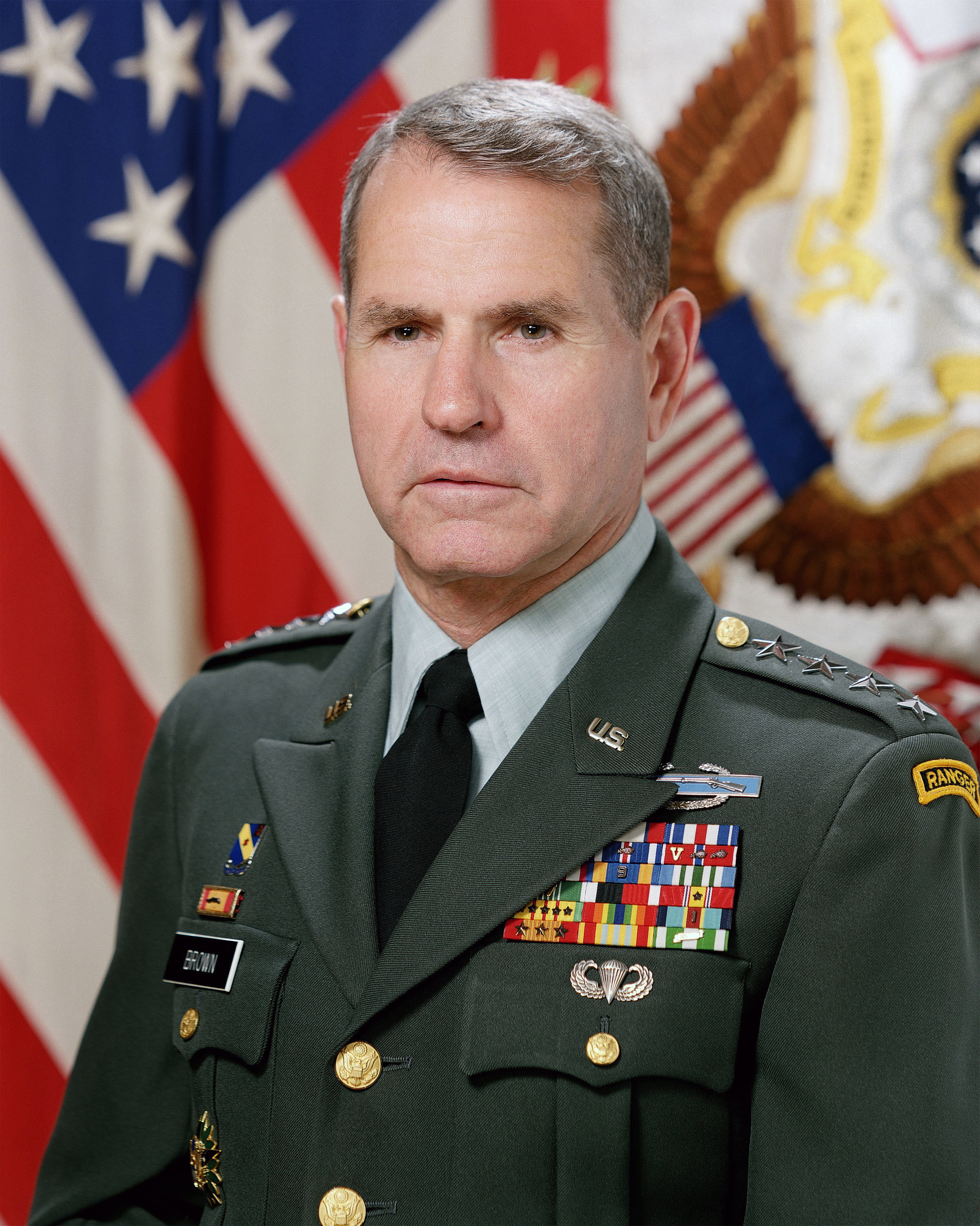
- Brown in 1989
- Born: Arthur Edmon Brown Jr. 21 November 1929 (age 96); Manila, Philippines
- Education: United States Military Academy; United States Army Command and General Staff College; United States Army War College; University of Pittsburgh
- Military career
- Allegiance: United States
- Branch: United States Army
- Service years: 1953–1989
- Rank: General
- Commands: Vice Chief of Staff; Director of the Army Staff; 1st Brigade, 1st Infantry Division
- Conflicts: Vietnam War
- Awards: Defense Distinguished Service Medal; Army Distinguished Service Medal (2); Silver Star; Legion of Merit (4); Distinguished Flying Cross

Arthur Edmon Brown Jr. (born 21 November 1929) is a retired American general who served as the 20th vice chief of staff of the United States Army from 1987 to 1989. He was previously the director of the Army Staff from 1983 to 1987.

== Military career ==
Brown was born on 21 November 1929, in Manila, Philippines, the son of an Army dental surgeon. After graduating from high school, he attended the University of Alabama for two years before being accepted to West Point. He graduated from the United States Military Academy in 1953 and was commissioned in the infantry, and also married the former Jerry Cook immediately upon graduation.

After graduating from Airborne and Ranger School, he was assigned as a rifle platoon leader with the 508th Airborne Regimental Combat Team. He was a company commander in the 60th Infantry Regiment from 1954 to 1956. In 1962, he graduated from the United States Army Command and General Staff College. He went to Vietnam with the Military Advisory Assistance Group-Vietnam from 1962 to 1963, receiving the Combat Infantryman Badge, Bronze Star, and an Army Commendation Medal with "V" device.

Upon returning to the U.S. he attended the University of Pittsburgh and earned a master's degree in public and international affairs in 1964, and then was assigned to the Directorate of Plans, Army Combat Development Command, and awarded a Legion of Merit for his work on the Assessment of Combat Effectiveness Study and the Dynamics of Firepower and Maneuver Study, as well as for his efforts as a member of the Pacification Role in Vietnam Study Group and his work with the Institute of Land Combat. He served as executive officer to the U.S. Representative, NATO Military Committee in Belgium, from 1967 to 1968, earning a Joint Service Commendation Medal.

He graduated from the Army War College and returned to Vietnam in 1969 for a second tour, commanding the 1st Battalion, 52nd Infantry Regiment of the Americal Division and serving as an advisor to the 9th Infantry Division, Army of the Republic of Vietnam. While commanding the battalion he was awarded the Silver Star, the Bronze Star Medal with "V" device, the Legion of Merit, the Distinguished Flying Cross, and the Air Medal.

After his second Vietnam tour he returned to the Army War College as Director, Arms Control and Disarmament Studies, and later served as Director, General Purpose Forces Strategy Studies. His work there earned him a third Legion of Merit. He went on to command the 1st Brigade, 1st Infantry Division from 1973 to 1975, and worked as a division chief and executive officer in the Office of the Deputy Chief of Staff for Operations from 1975 to 1978, receiving a fourth Legion of Merit.

Brown next served as Assistant Division Commander, 25th Infantry Division from 1978 to 1980. He returned to West Point as Deputy Superintendent, and his tenure there also had him responsible for the welcome, housing, and transition of the American hostages that had been released from Iran, for which he received a Meritorious Service Medal. In 1981, he took command of Mobilization and Readiness Region IV, which was responsible for Reserve and National Guard units in five southeastern states, Puerto Rico, and the Virgin Islands.

As a Lieutenant General in 1983, he was assigned as Director of the Army Staff, and oversaw the greatest modernization program since World War II. This included the transition to the M1 Abrams, the M2/M3 Bradley Fighting Vehicle, UH-60 Blackhawk, AH-64 Apache, and the creation or transition to four light infantry divisions: the 6th, 7th, 10th and 25th Infantry Divisions. He also managed the staff reorganization mandated by the Goldwater-Nichols Department of Defense Reorganization Act of 1986 and served as a member of the Stilwell Commission on security. He was also responsible for providing guidance on public affairs matters during a time which saw the Gander aircraft disaster and Operation Urgent Fury. For his work as the Director of the Army Staff, he was awarded the Distinguished Service Medal.

In June 1987, he was appointed to the post of Vice Chief of Staff of the Army. He served as Chief of the U.S. Delegation to the 1987 American, British, Canadian, and Australian Conference on Military Standardization and provided analyses and advice on the Intermediate-range Nuclear Force Arms Control Treaty. He retired in 1989, and was awarded both the Defense Distinguished Service Medal and Army Distinguished Service Medal.

== Awards and decorations ==
Brown's decorations and medals include:

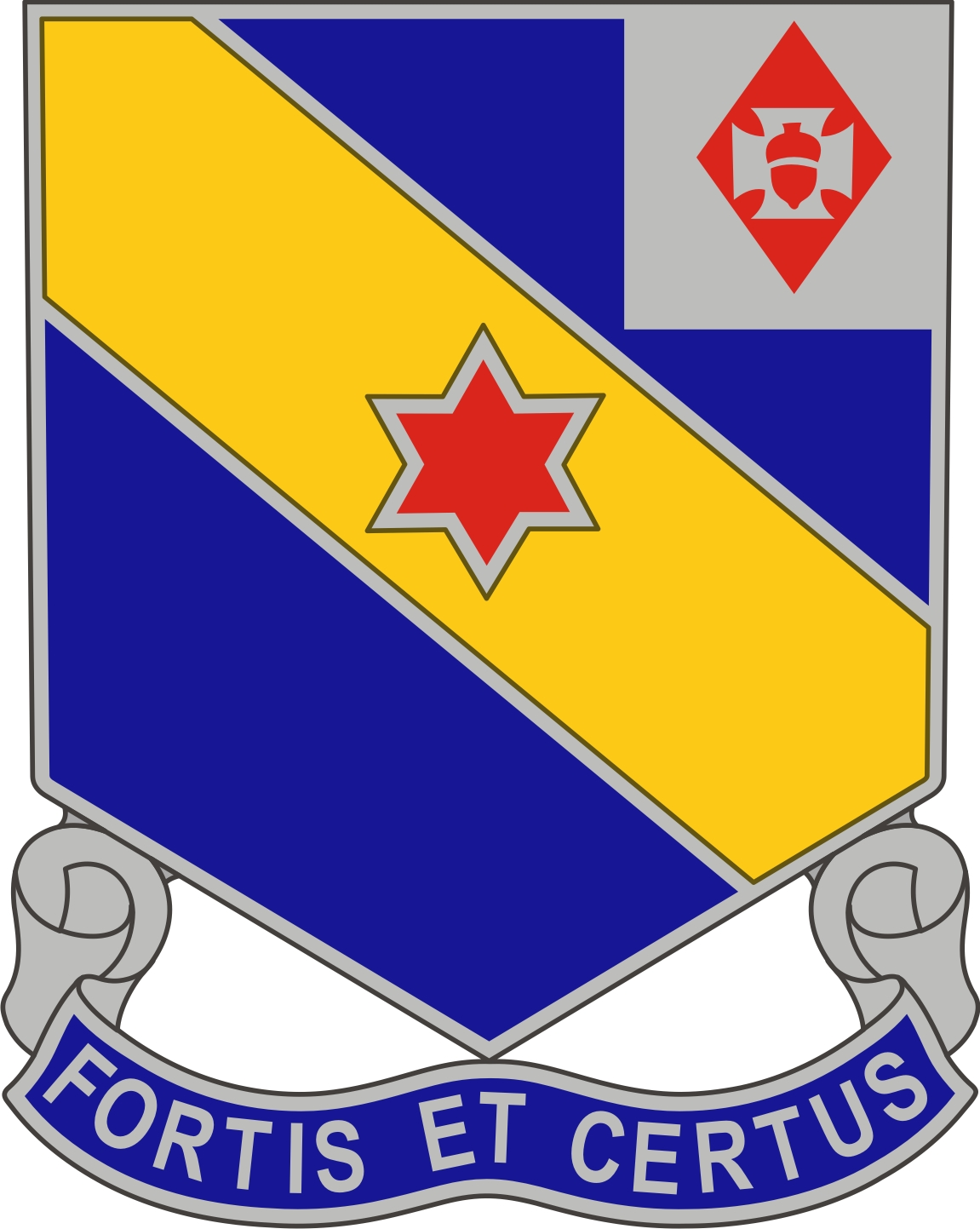

Combat Infantry Badge
Defense Distinguished Service Medal
| Army Distinguished Service Medal | Silver Star Medal | Legion of Merit with three oak leaf clusters |
| Distinguished Flying Cross with oak leaf cluster | Bronze Star with "V" Device and two oak leaf clusters | Meritorious Service Medal |
| Air Medal with bronze award numeral 9 | Joint Service Commendation Medal | Army Commendation Medal with "V" Device |
| Army of Occupation Medal | National Defense Service Medal with bronze service star | Vietnam Service Medal with five bronze service stars |
| Army Service Ribbon | Army Overseas Service Ribbon with bronze award numeral 1 | Gallantry Cross (Vietnam) with two gold and one bronze stars |
| Vietnam Armed Forces Honor Medal 1st class | Vietnam Gallantry Cross Unit Citation | Vietnam Campaign Medal |
| United States Army Parachutist Badge | United States Army Staff Identification Badge | 52nd Infantry Regiment insignia |
Ranger Tab

== Post military career ==
After retiring from the military, he served in various community service positions, including serving on the board of the United Way of Beaufort County, South Carolina, serving as a trustee of the Technical College of the Lowcountry Foundation and later as chairman, and serving on the board of the Hilton Head Island Foundation. He was the 2002 Distinguished Graduate Award recipient from the Association of Graduates, the United States Military Academy alumni association.

== Notes ==
In 2010 General Brown was awarded the Distinguished Alumnus Award by the University of Pittsburgh's Graduate School of Public and International Affairs.

Military offices
| Preceded by Gen. Maxwell R. Thurman | Vice Chief of Staff of the United States Army; 1987–1989 | Succeeded by Gen. Robert W. RisCassi |
