= Robert P. White =

American Army general

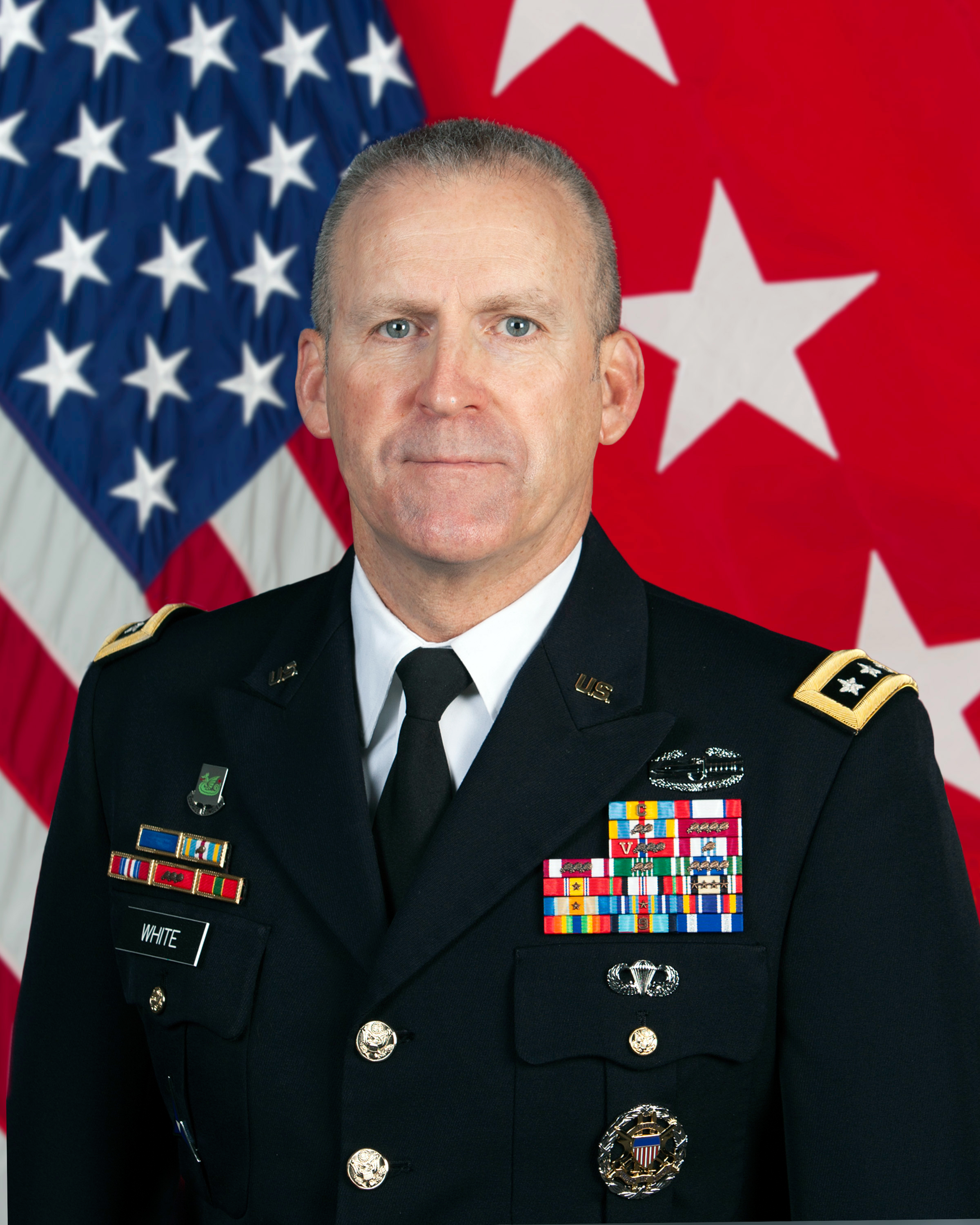
- Born: August 24, 1963 (age 63)
- Military career
- Allegiance: United States
- Branch: United States Army
- Service years: 1986–2022
- Rank: Lieutenant General
- Nickname: "Pat"
- Commands: III Corps; Combined Joint Task Force – Operation Inherent Resolve; Fort Hood; 1st Armored Division; Fort Bliss; 2nd Brigade Combat Team, 1st Armored Division; 2nd Battalion, 37th Armor Regiment
- Conflicts: Iraq War; War in Afghanistan; Operation Inherent Resolve
- Awards: Defense Distinguished Service Medal; Army Distinguished Service Medal; Defense Superior Service Medal; Legion of Merit (4); Bronze Star Medal (4)

Robert P. White (born August 24, 1963) is a retired United States Army lieutenant general who last served as commander of Fort Hood, Texas, and as the 61st Commanding General of III Armored Corps. Over 90,000 soldiers were under his command. From September 2019 to September 2020, he also served as commander of Combined Joint Task Force – Operation Inherent Resolve (CJTF-OIR).

== Education ==
White holds a Bachelor of Arts in History from Claremont McKenna College, a Master of Science in Administration from Central Michigan University, and a Master of Science in Strategic Studies from the United States Army War College.

White's military education includes the Armor Officer Basic and Advanced Courses, the Field Artillery Officer Advanced Course, the United States Army Command and General Staff College, the Joint and Combined Warfighting School, and the United States Army War College.

== Military career ==
White commissioned in the United States Army as an Armor Officer in 1986, and has served in a variety of United States Army, Joint, Combined, and staff positions while stationed on 4 continents. He has served in the Iraq War, the War in Afghanistan, and Operation Inherent Resolve commanding formations all the way up to the corps level. From September 2019 to September 2020, he was in command of the United States led intervention against ISIS as the commander of CJTF-OIR while also commanding III Corps and Fort Hood.

== Awards and decorations ==
Combat Action Badge
Basic Parachutist Badge
Joint Chiefs of Staff Badge
1st Armored Division Combat Service Identification Badge
37th Armored Regiment Distinctive Unit Insignia
? Overseas Service Bars

Defense Distinguished Service Medal with "C" device
Army Distinguished Service Medal
Defense Superior Service Medal with two bronze oak leaf clusters
Legion of Merit with four bronze oak leaf clusters
Bronze Star Medal with "V" device and three oak leaf clusters
Defense Meritorious Service Medal with bronze oak leaf cluster
Meritorious Service Medal with three bronze oak leaf clusters
Army Commendation Medal with two bronze oak leaf clusters
Army Achievement Medal with four bronze oak leaf clusters
Army Presidential Unit Citation
Joint Meritorious Unit Award with bronze oak leaf cluster
Valorous Unit Award
Meritorious Unit Commendation with three bronze oak leaf clusters
Superior Unit Award
National Defense Service Medal with one bronze service star
Afghanistan Campaign Medal
Iraq Campaign Medal with four campaign stars
Inherent Resolve Campaign Medal with campaign star
Global War on Terrorism Expeditionary Medal with bronze star
Global War on Terrorism Service Medal
Army Service Ribbon
Army Overseas Service Ribbon with bronze award numeral 9
NATO Medal for Service with ISAF

Military offices
Preceded by Thomas S. James Jr.	Deputy Chief of Staff for Operations, Plans, and Training of the United States Army Forces Command; 2015–2016	Succeeded by Leopoldo A. Quintas
Preceded by Stephen Twitty	Commanding General of the 1st Armored Division; 2016–2018	Succeeded by Patrick Matlock
Preceded by John C. Thomson III	Director of Operations of the United States European Command; 2018–2019	Succeeded by Michael L. Howard
Preceded by Paul J. LaCamera	Commanding General of the Combined Joint Task Force - Operation Inherent Resolve; 2019–2020	Succeeded by Paul T. Calvert
Preceded by Paul E. Funk II	Commanding General of III Armored Corps; 2019–2022	Succeeded by Sean C. Bernabe
