= Robert W. Mixon Jr. =

American military personnel (born 1952)

- Born: October 5, 1952 (age 74); Georgia, US
- Alma mater: United States Military Academy; Rice University; US Army Command and General Staff College
- Military career
- Allegiance: United States
- Branch: US Army
- Service years: ? - 2007
- Rank: Major General

Major General Robert Wilbur Mixon Jr. (born October 5, 1952) is a retired officer of the United States Army, public speaker, author, and the co-founder of Level Five Associates.

== Biography ==
Born in Georgia, Mixon graduated from the United States Military Academy at West Point with a B.S. degree in 1974. He earned an M.A. degree in history from Rice University in 1982 with a thesis entitled Pioneer Professional: General John M. Schofield and the development of a professional officer corps, 1888-1895. Mixon also received a Master of Military Art and Science degree from the School of Advanced Military Studies at the United States Army Command and General Staff College in 1987. Mixon was commissioned in 1974 upon graduating from West Point. After completing his first master's degree, he returned there to teach history from 1982 to 1985.

Mixon was nominated for appointment to the rank of Brigadier General in 1998 and then for the rank of Major General in 2002. In 2003, General Peter Schoomaker chose Mixon to lead Task Force Modularity with the aim of changing the US Army's structure. The task force would attempt to break the US Army up into smaller, more effective "units of action." This modularization represented a shift from a hierarchical structure to a functional structure.

Robert W. Mixon Jr. retired from active duty on October 1, 2007, after more than 33 years of commissioned service and took over as president of Magnatag Visible Systems in the same month. Mixon would later serve as the Executive Vice President of Strategic Planning and Leadership Development at CDS Monarch. While with CDS Monarch, Mixon helped to found the Warrior Salute Program for veterans with PTSD and traumatic brain injury.

Mixon would go on to co-found Level Five Associates, a leadership consulting company specializing in change management, in 2009 with his long-time friend and former classmate Major General (ret.) John Batiste. Mixon and Batiste co-wrote the best-selling book, Cows in the Living Room: Developing an Effective Strategic Plan and Sustaining It, in 2014.
