= Willard Burleson =

U.S. Army general

Willard M. Burleson III
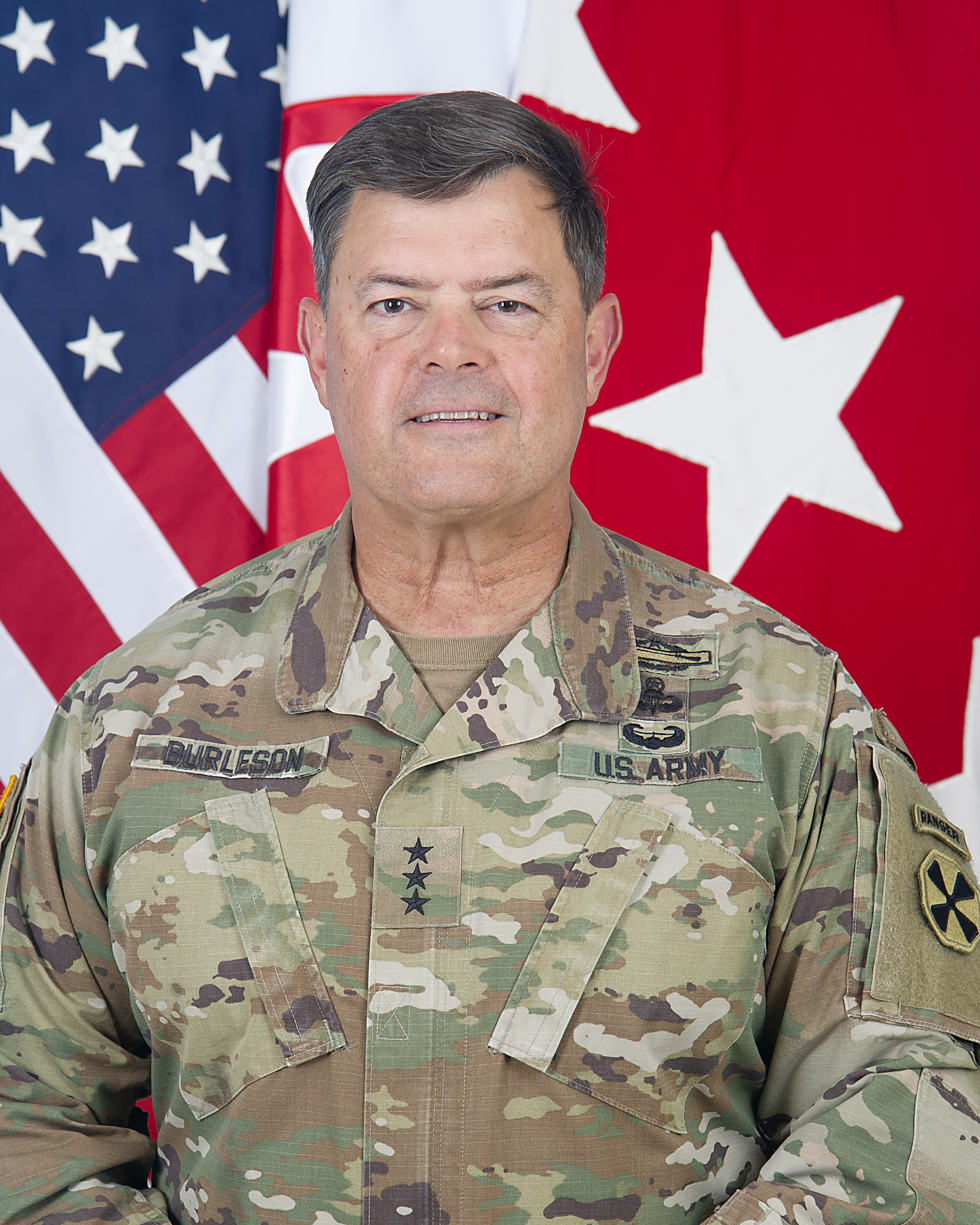
- Born: October 9, 1965 (age 61); Philadelphia, Pennsylvania, U.S.
- Military career
- Allegiance: United States
- Branch: United States Army
- Service years: 1988–2024
- Rank: Lieutenant General
- Commands: Eighth United States Army; 7th Infantry Division; 1st Brigade, 10th Mountain Division; 1st Battalion, 87th Infantry Regiment
- Conflicts: Gulf War; War in Afghanistan; Iraq War
- Awards: Army Distinguished Service Medal; Defense Superior Service Medal; Legion of Merit (4); Bronze Star Medal (3)

Willard McKenzie Burleson III (born October 9, 1965) is a retired United States Army lieutenant general who served as commanding General of the Eighth United States Army and chief of staff of the ROK/US Combined Forces Command from 2020 to 2024.

Previously, Burleson served as the director of operations of the United Nations Command, ROK/US Combined Forces Command, and United States Forces Korea.

== Education ==
Burleson holds a Bachelor of Science degree from the United States Military Academy. He also earned a master's degree in Strategic Studies from the United States Army War College and a master's degree in Military Art and Science from the Army Command and General Staff College.

== Military career ==
Burleson graduated from the United States Military Academy and was commissioned into the Infantry in May 1988. Burleson's first assignment was in the 7th Infantry Division (Light), Fort Ord, California, which included service in the Multi-National Force and Observers, Sinai Peninsula, Egypt, and the invasion of Panama. He also served in 1st Battalion, 75th Ranger Regiment, Savannah, Georgia. He later commanded airborne companies in Vicenza, Italy, which included service as part of the initial entry force for operations in Bosnia-Herzegovina.

After competing duties in Italy, Burleson returned to the 75th Ranger Regiment at Fort Benning, Georgia, and then served as aide-de-camp to the commander of United States Army Training and Doctrine Command. Burleson later served in the 82nd Airborne Division at Fort Bragg, North Carolina, with deployments to Kosovo and Afghanistan.

Burleson next served as aide-de-camp to the commander of the XVIII Airborne Corps, with duty in the Combined Joint Task Force 180 and Multi-National Corps Iraq. Following that tour of duty, Burleson commanded the 1st Battalion, 87th Infantry, 10th Mountain Division at Fort Drum, New York, which included a tour with Multi-National Division, Baghdad, Iraq.

After attending the United States Army War College, Burleson returned to the 10th Mountain Division as commander of the 1st Brigade, which included a deployment to Regional Command-North, Afghanistan. Upon completion of brigade command, he served as the commander of the Joint Readiness Training Center's Operations Group at Fort Polk, Louisiana.

Burleson later served as the deputy commanding general (operations), 7th Infantry Division (United States), Joint Base Lewis-McChord, Washington, and director of the Mission Command Center of Excellence at Fort Leavenworth, Kansas, and as senior advisor to the Ministry of Defense, Afghanistan. Before serving in the Republic of Korea, Burleson served as the commanding general of 7th Infantry Division at Joint Base Lewis-McChord, Washington.

He relinquished command of Eighth Army to Christopher LaNeve on April 5, 2024.

== Awards and decorations ==
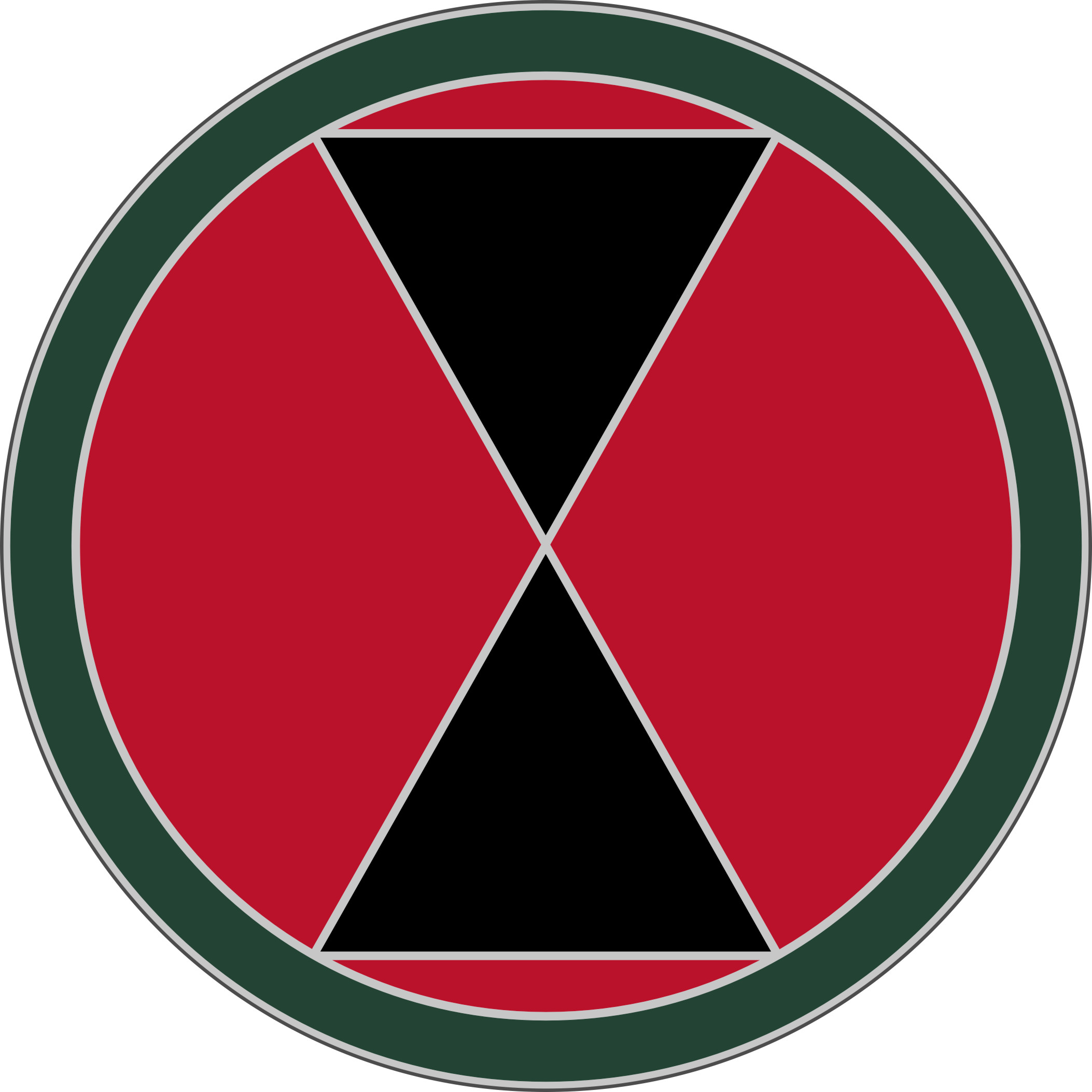
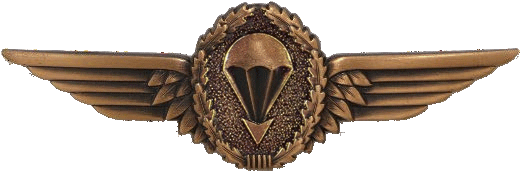
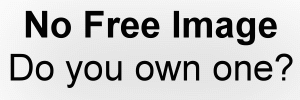
Combat Infantryman Badge with star (denoting 2nd award)
Ranger tab
Air Assault Badge
Master Parachutist Badge
7th Infantry Division Combat Service Identification Badge
German Parachutist badge
British Parachutist Badge
Unidentified foreign parachutist badge
75th Ranger Regiment Distinctive Unit Insignia
9 Overseas Service Bars

Army Distinguished Service Medal
Defense Superior Service Medal
Legion of Merit with three bronze oak leaf clusters
Bronze Star Medal with two oak leaf clusters
Defense Meritorious Service Medal
Meritorious Service Medal with three oak leaf clusters
Joint Service Commendation Medal
Army Commendation Medal with four oak leaf clusters
Army Achievement Medal with silver oak leaf cluster
Joint Meritorious Unit Award
Meritorious Unit Commendation with oak leaf cluster
Superior Unit Award with two oak leaf clusters
National Defense Service Medal with one bronze service star
Armed Forces Expeditionary Medal with service star
Southwest Asia Service Medal with service star
Kosovo Campaign Medal with service star
Afghanistan Campaign Medal with three campaign stars
Iraq Campaign Medal with two campaign stars
Global War on Terrorism Expeditionary Medal with service star
Global War on Terrorism Service Medal
Korea Defense Service Medal
Armed Forces Service Medal
Army Service Ribbon
Army Overseas Service Ribbon with bronze award numeral 5
NATO Medal for ex-Yugoslavia
Multinational Force and Observers Medal
Kuwait Liberation Medal (Kuwait)

== Personal life ==
Burleson and his wife both come from army families and they have a son and a daughter.

Military offices
Preceded by Thomas S. James Jr.	Director to the Ministry of Defense of the Mission Command Center of Excellence; 2014–2016	Succeeded by James J. Mingus
Preceded by Warren E. Phipps Jr.	Senior Advisor to the Ministry of Defense of the United States Forces Afghanistan; 2016–2017	Succeeded by Christopher F. Bentley
Preceded by Thomas S. James Jr.	Commanding General of the 7th Infantry Division; 2017–2019	Succeeded by Xavier T. Brunson
Preceded by James E. Kraft	Director of Operations of the United Nations Command, ROK/US Combined Forces Command, and United States Forces Korea; 2019–2020	Succeeded by Patrick Matlock
Preceded by Michael A. Bills	Commanding General of the Eighth United States Army and Chief of Staff of the ROK/US Combined Forces Command; 2020–2024	Succeeded by Christopher LaNeve
