= Xavier Brunson =

U.S. Army general (born 1968)

Xavier T. Brunson
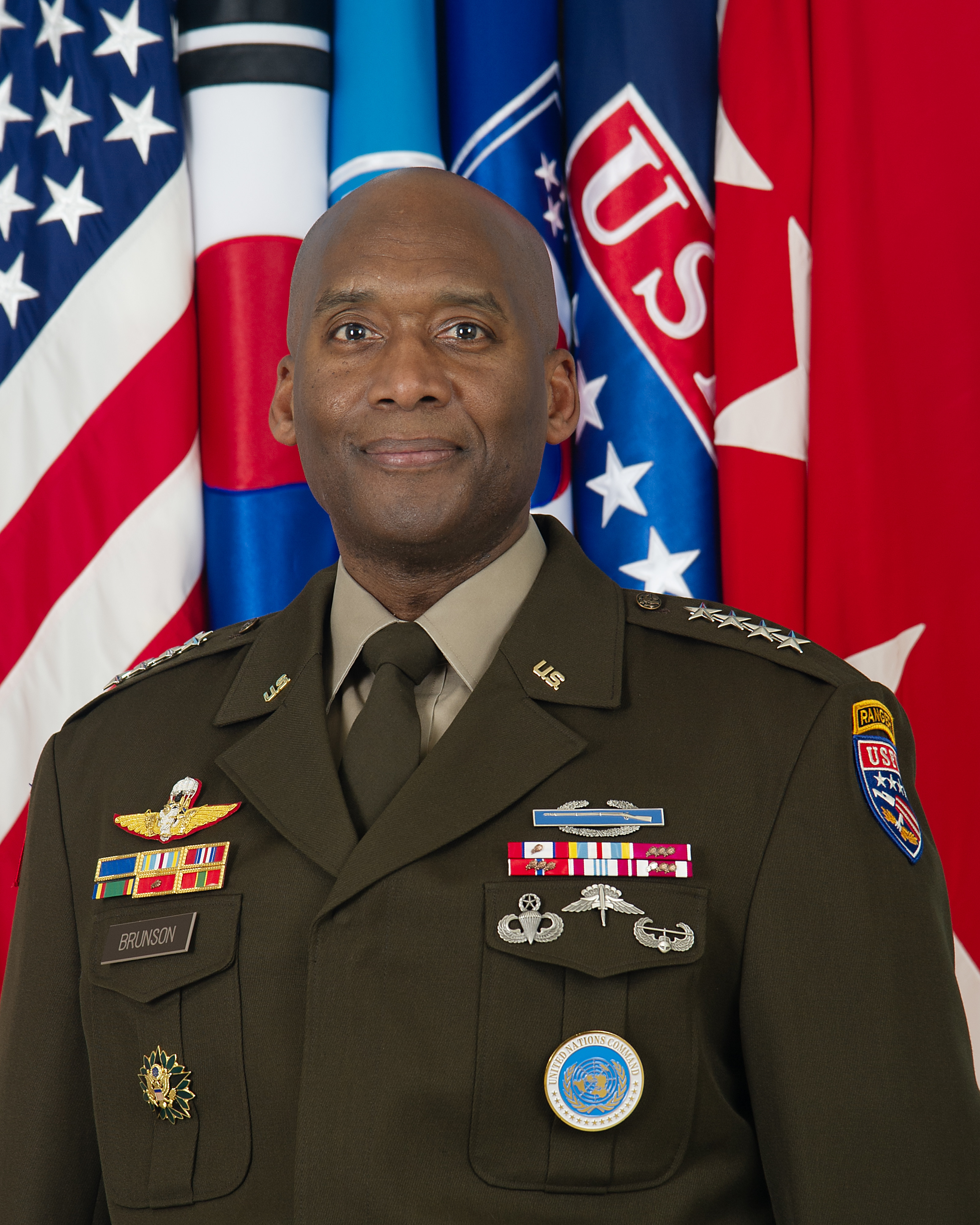
- Brunson in 2024
- Born: 1968 (age 57–58); Fort Bragg, North Carolina, U.S.
- Education: Hampton University (BA); Webster University (MA); United States Army War College (MNSS)
- Spouse: Col. (ret) Kirsten Brunson
- Children: 3
- Relatives: Married
- Military career
- Allegiance: United States
- Branch: United States Army
- Service years: 1990–present
- Rank: General
- Commands: United Nations Command; ROK/US Combined Forces Command; United States Forces Korea; I Corps; 7th Infantry Division; 525th Battlefield Surveillance Brigade (Airborne); 1st Battalion, 504th Parachute Infantry Regiment
- Conflicts: Iraq War; War in Afghanistan; Operation Inherent Resolve
- Awards: Army Distinguished Service Medal (2); Defense Superior Service Medal; Legion of Merit (4); Bronze Star Medal (4)

Xavier T. Brunson is a United States Army general who has served as the commander of United Nations Command, ROK/US Combined Forces Command and United States Forces Korea since 20 December 2024. He most recently served as the commanding general of I Corps from 2021 to 2024. He previously served as deputy commanding general of I Corps from May to September 2021, and commanding general of the 7th Infantry Division from 2019 to 2021, with assignments as chief of staff of XVIII Airborne Corps from 2017 to 2019 and deputy commanding general for operations of the 10th Mountain Division from 2016 to 2017.

A native of Fayetteville, North Carolina, Brunson enrolled in Reid Ross High School. Brunson holds a bachelor's degree in political science from Hampton University (where he earned his commission in 1990), a master's degree in human resources from Webster University, and a master's degree in national security and strategic studies from the United States Army War College.

== Awards and decorations ==

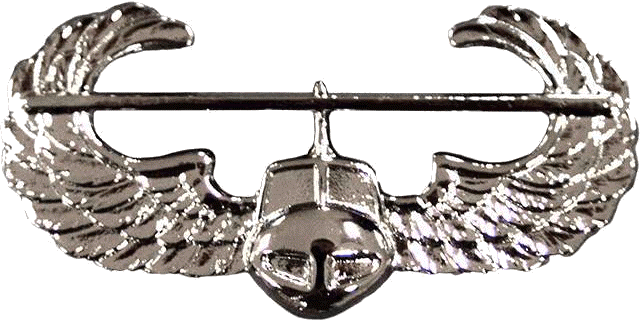

| Badge | Combat Infantryman Badge | | |
| 1st row | Army Distinguished Service Medal with Oak leaf cluster | | |
| 2nd row | Defense Superior Service Medal | Legion of Merit with 3 Oak leaf clusters | Bronze Star with 3 Oak leaf clusters |
| 3rd row | Defense Meritorious Service Medal | Meritorious Service Medal with 3 Oak leaf clusters | Joint Service Commendation Medal |
| 4th row | Army Commendation Medal with 2 bronze Oak leaf clusters | Joint Service Achievement Medal | Achievement Medal with 3 Oak leaf clusters |
| 5th row | National Defense Service Medal with 1 Service star | Kosovo Campaign Medal | Afghanistan Campaign Medal with 1 bronze Campaign star |
| 6th row | Iraq Campaign Medal with 1 silver Campaign star and 1 silver Campaign star | Inherent Resolve Campaign Medal | Humanitarian Service Medal |
| 7th row | Global War on Terrorism Expeditionary Medal | Global War on Terrorism Service Medal | Korea Defense Service Medal |
| 8th row | Army Service Ribbon | Army Overseas Service Ribbon award numeral 2 | NATO Medal for Kosovo |
| 9th row | Presidential Unit Citation | Joint Meritorious Unit Award | Meritorious Unit Commendation with Oak leaf cluster |
| 10th row | Valorous Unit Award | Navy Unit Commendation | Army Superior Unit Award |
| Badges | Air Assault Badge | Military Freefall Parachutist Badge | Master Parachutist Badge |

Other accoutrements
| Ranger tab |
| 82nd Airborne Division Shoulder Sleeve Insignia - Former Wartime Service |
| Royal Thai Army Parachutist Badge |
| United Nations Command Badge |
| 11 Overseas Service Bars |

Military offices
| Preceded by Paul Bontrager | Deputy Commanding General (Operations) of the 10th Mountain Division; 2016–2017 | Succeeded by Brian S. Eifler |
| Preceded by Willard Burleson | Commanding General of the 7th Infantry Division; 2019–2021 | Succeeded by Stephen G. Smith |
| Preceded by Stephen G. Smith | Deputy Commanding General of I Corps; 2021 | Succeeded by William A. Ryan III |
| Preceded by Randy George | Commanding General of I Corps; 2021–2024 | Succeeded by Matthew McFarlane |
| Preceded by Paul LaCamera | Commander of United Nations Command; Commander of United States Forces Korea; Commander of ROK/US Combined Forces Command; 2024–present | Incumbent |
