= Thomas S. James Jr. =

United States Army Lieutenant General

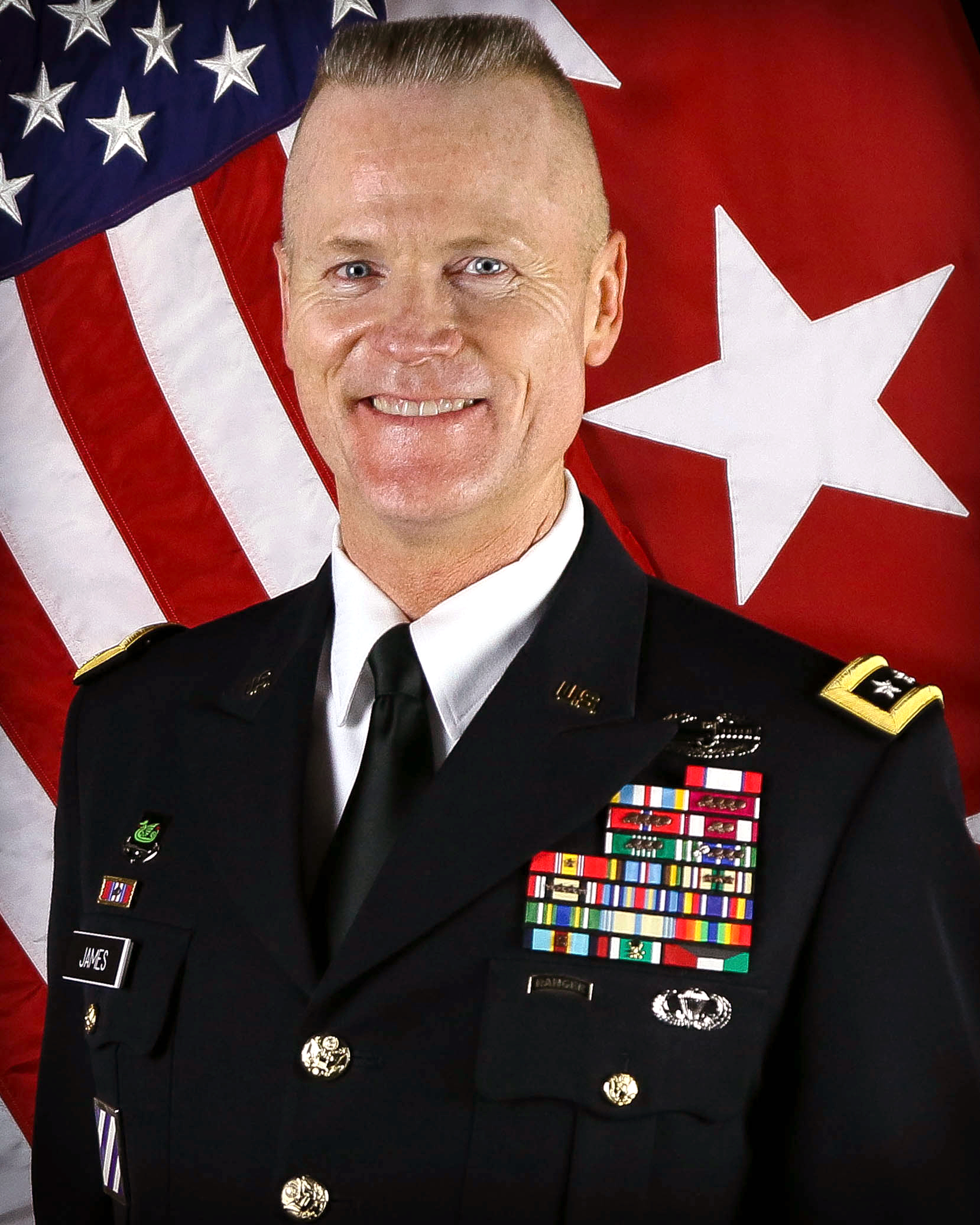
- Lieutenant General Thomas S. James, Jr.
- Born: Greenville, South Carolina, U.S.
- Military career
- Allegiance: United States
- Branch: United States Army
- Service years: 1985–2021
- Rank: Lieutenant General
- Commands: First United States Army; 7th Infantry Division; United States Army Armor School; 4th Brigade, 3rd Infantry Division; 1st Battalion, 37th Armor Regiment
- Conflicts: Gulf War; Iraq War
- Awards: Army Distinguished Service Medal; Defense Superior Service Medal; Legion of Merit (5); Bronze Star Medal (5)

Thomas Sease James Jr. (born October 15, 1963) is a retired United States Army lieutenant general who last served as the 39th Commanding General of the First United States Army headquartered at Rock Island Arsenal, Illinois. He held his latest position from October 29, 2018, to July 8, 2021, after having previously served as Deputy Chief of Staff for United Nations Command/Combined Forces Command/United States Forces Korea.

He relinquished command of First Army to Antonio Aguto on July 8, 2021, and retired from active duty with 36 years of distinguished service the same day.

== Military career ==
A native of Greenville, South Carolina, James attended J.L. Mann High School and was commissioned as an Armor Officer through the Army ROTC program at The Citadel. After serving as a Tank Platoon Leader and Executive Officer in the 37th Armor Regiment at Fort Riley, Kansas, he attended the Infantry Officer Advanced Course then deployed to Operations Desert Shield and Desert Storm as the Plans Officer for 3rd Brigade, 3rd Infantry Division in Aschaffenburg, Germany, subsequently commanding companies in both the 66th and 68th Armor Regiments.

James next served as aide-de-camp to the commanding general, 1st Armored Division in Bad Kreuznach, Germany. Following attendance at the Command and General Staff College and the School of Advanced Military Studies, he again served with the 3d Infantry Division as Plans and Training Officer; then as Operations Officer for 1st Battalion 64th Armor and 2nd Brigade. He returned to Germany as the operations and training officer for V Corps, before commanding the 1st Battalion, 37th Armor during its preparation for and deployment to Operation Iraqi Freedom; while deployed he also served as the Plans Officer for the 1st Armored Division.

Upon completion of the National War College, James served as the Chief of the Training and Doctrine Command Planning Group and subsequently commanded 4th Brigade, 3d Infantry Division at Fort Stewart, Georgia, which included a second deployment to Iraq. Upon departure from brigade command, he served as the Division Chief of Staff and Deputy Commander (Maneuver), completing another deployment to Operation Iraqi Freedom and Operation New Dawn.

Upon promotion to brigadier general, James was assigned as Commandant of the Armor School at Fort Benning, Georgia. He then served as Deputy Commanding General (Maneuver) of the 1st Cavalry Division at Fort Hood, Texas, the Director of the Mission Command Center of Excellence at Fort Leavenworth, Kansas, and Deputy Chief of Staff for Operations, Plans and Training for Forces Command at Fort Bragg, North Carolina. He was next elevated to Commanding General of the 7th Infantry Division at Fort Lewis, Washington.

James' awards and decorations include: the Army Distinguished Service Medal, the Defense Superior Service Medal, 5 awards of the Legion of Merit, 5 Bronze Star Medals, 3 Meritorious Service Medals, the Combat Action Badge, Parachutist Badge, and the Ranger Tab. James holds a Master of Science from both the School of Advanced Military Studies and the National Defense University.

Military offices
| Preceded by James Rainey | Director to the Ministry of Defense of the Mission Command Center of Excellence; 2013–2014 | Succeeded by Willard Burleson |
| Preceded by Stephen M. Twitty | Deputy Chief of Staff for Operations, Plans, and Training of the United States Army Forces Command; 2014–2015 | Succeeded by Robert P. White |
| Preceded by Terry R. Ferrell | Commanding General of the 7th Infantry Division; 2015–2017 | Succeeded by Willard Burleson |
| Preceded by Michael A. Bills | Director of Operations of the United Nations Command, ROK/US Combined Forces Command, and United States Forces Korea; 2017–2018 | Succeeded by James E. Kraft |
| Preceded by Erik C. Peterson; Acting | Commanding General of the First United States Army; 2018–2021 | Succeeded by Antonio Aguto |
