= Jeffery Broadwater =

US Army general

Jeffery D. Broadwater
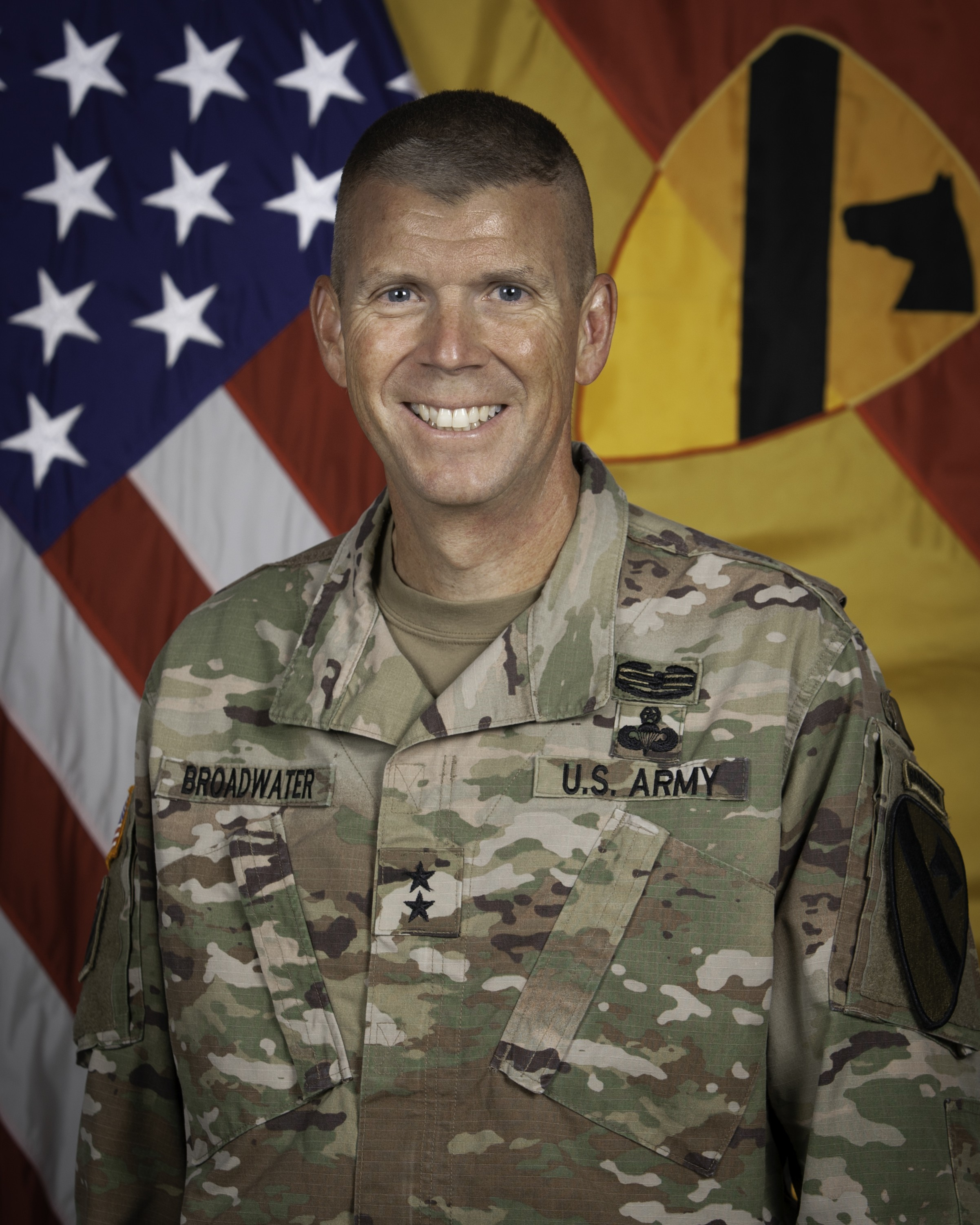
- Born: 1967 (age 58–59); Fort Benning, Georgia, U.S.
- Education: University of Kentucky (BS); Army Ranger School; Naval Postgraduate School (MS); United States Army Command and General Staff College; National War College (MS)
- Spouse: Alicia Broadwater
- Children: 3
- Relatives: Lt. Col. (ret.) Terry W. Broadwater (father)
- Military career
- Allegiance: United States of America
- Branch: United States Army
- Service years: 1989–2023
- Rank: Major General
- Commands: 1st Cavalry Division; Fort Irwin National Training Center; Operations Group, Fort Irwin National Training Center; 2nd Brigade Combat Team, 1st Armored Division; 3rd Squadron, 7th Cavalry Regiment
- Conflicts: Gulf War; Operation Uphold Democracy; Iraq War
- Awards: Defense Superior Service Medal; Legion of Merit; Bronze Star Medal

Jeffery D. Broadwater (born 1967) is a retired United States Army major general who last served as deputy commanding general of V Corps from August 2021 to July 2023. He previously served as commanding general of the 1st Cavalry Division from October 2019 to July 2021. Prior to that, he served as commanding general of the Fort Irwin National Training Center from November 2016 to September 2019.

Broadwater was among 14 Fort Hood military leaders fired or suspended from duty by then-Secretary of the Army Ryan D. McCarthy for creating a "permissive environment" that let crimes up to sexual harassment and assault occur with little punitive action, per an investigation into the death of Vanessa Guillén. He ultimately did not face any disciplinary action, but was consequently not present at the 1st Cavalry's change of command ceremony in July 2021.

Military offices
Preceded by Leopoldo A. Quintas	Deputy Commanding General for Support of the 1st Armored Division; 2015–2016	Succeeded by Mark H. Landes
Preceded by Richard C. Kim	Director of Future Operations of Resolute Support Mission; 2016	Succeeded by Patrick J. Donahoe
Preceded by Joseph M. Martin	Commanding General of the Fort Irwin National Training Center; 2016–2019	Succeeded by David A. Lesperance
Preceded by Paul T. Calvert	Commanding General of the 1st Cavalry Division; 2019–2021	Succeeded by John B. Richardson IV
Preceded by Matthew J. Van Wagenen	Deputy Commanding General of V Corps; 2021–2023	Succeeded by Kevin J. Lambert
