= David Lesperance =

US Army general

David A. Lesperance
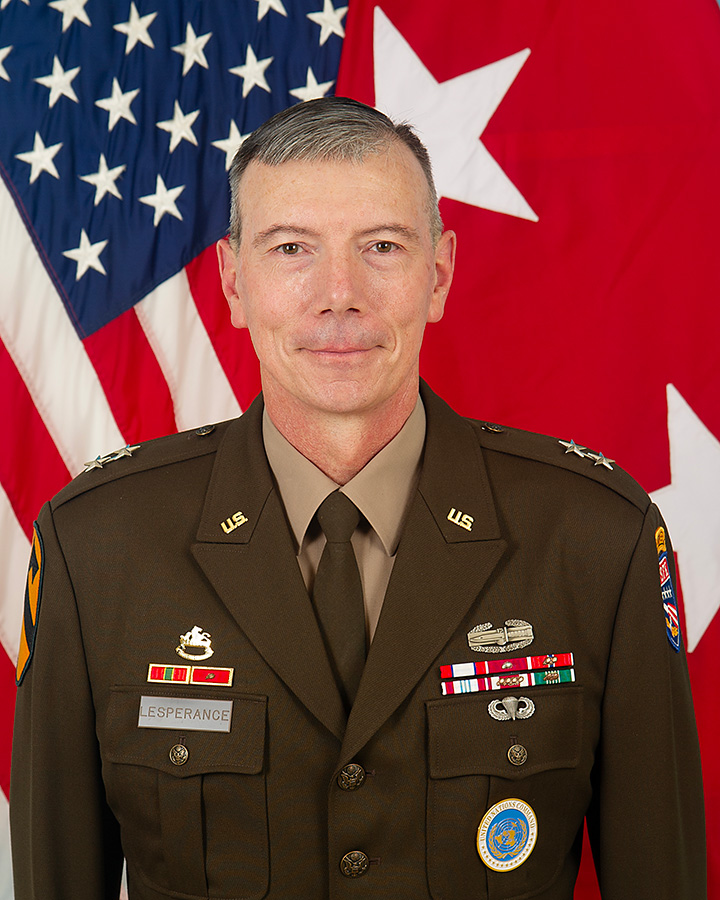
- Education: Portland State University; United States Army Command and General Staff College; United States Army War College
- Spouse: Kelly Lesperance
- Military career
- Allegiance: United States
- Branch: United States Army
- Service years: 1989–2024
- Rank: Major General
- Commands: 2nd Infantry Division; Fort Irwin National Training Center; United States Army Armor School; 3rd Brigade Combat Team, 1st Cavalry Division; 1st Battalion, 8th Cavalry Regiment
- Conflicts: Gulf War; Operation Joint Forge; Iraq War
- Awards: Legion of Merit (3); Bronze Star Medal (3)

David A. Lesperance is a retired United States Army major general who last served as the director of operations of United Nations Command, ROK/US Combined Forces Command and United States Forces Korea from June 2023 to July 2024. He most recently served as commanding general of the 2nd Infantry Division from May 18, 2021, to May 15, 2023. Prior to that, he served as commanding general of the Fort Irwin National Training Center from September 2019 to April 2021.

The "Lesperance Landing Pad", part of the Desert combat area of the National Training Center, is named after Lesperance to commemorate his tenure as commander of the center.

Military offices
| Preceded by Douglas Crissman | Commander of the 3rd Brigade Combat Team, 1st Cavalry Division; 2012–2014 | Succeeded by Matthew J. Van Wagenen |
| Preceded by John S. Kolasheski | Commandant of the United States Army Armor School; 2017–2019 | Succeeded by Kevin Admiral |
| Preceded by Jeffery Broadwater | Commanding General of the Fort Irwin National Training Center; 2019–2021 | Succeeded by Curtis D. Taylor |
| Preceded by Steven W. Gilland | Commanding General of the 2nd Infantry Division; 2021–2023 | Succeeded by William D. Taylor |
| Preceded by Lonnie G. Hibbard | Director of Operations of the United Nations Command, ROK/US Combined Forces Command and United States Forces Korea; 2023–2024 | Succeeded by William D. Taylor |
