= List of commanders of 2nd Infantry Division (United States) =

Shoulder sleeve insignia of the US 2nd Infantry Division.

This is a list of commanders of the US 2nd Infantry Division of the United States Army.

== Division Commanders ==
Name	From	To	Comments
BGen Charles A. Doyen	26 October 1917	November 1917	World War I (United States Marine Corps)
MG Omar Bundy	8 November 1917	July 1918	World War I
MG James G. Harbord	15 July 1918	August 1918	World War I (BGen Wendell C. Neville, USMC, was ad interim from 17–22 July 1919)
MajGen John A. Lejeune	August 1918	December 1919	World War I (United States Marine Corps) (28 July 1918) (ad interim 26 July)
COL Harry A. Eaton	December 1919	March 1920	
MG James G. Harbord	March 1920	July 1921	
MG John L. Hines	July 1921	October 1921	
BG Edward Mann Lewis	October 1921	December 1922	Spanish–American War, World War I led 3rd Brigade 2nd Div. Battle of Chateau-Thierry, later the 30th Infantry Division Battle of St. Quentin Canal
BG Dennis E. Nolan	December 1922	June 1923	
BG Benjamin A. Poore	June 1923	July 1923	
MG Ernest Hinds	July 1923	October 1924	
BG Preston Brown	October 1924	April 1925	
MG Paul B. Malone	April 1925	June 1926	
MG William D. Connor	June 1926	December 1927	
BG Thomas Q. Donaldson	December 1927	February 1928	
BG Harold B. Fiske	February 1928	March 1928	
BG Albert J. Bowley	March 1928	April 1929	
BG Samuel D. Rockenbach	April 1929	November 1929	
MG Halstead Dorey	December 1933	May 1934	
BG Charles R. Howland	May 1934	February 1935	
MG Frank C. Bolles	March 1935	July 1935	
BG Alexander T. Ovenshine	July 1935	April 1936	
MG Charles E. Kilbourne	April 1936	May 1936	
BG Alexander T. Ovenshine	May 1936	July 1936	
MG Herbert J. Brees	July 1936	October 1936	
MG James K. Parsons	October 1936	May 1938	
MG Frank W. Rowell	May 1938	March 1939	
MG Walter Krueger	March 1939	October 1940	
MG James L. Collins	October 1940	March 1941	
BG Edmund L. Daley	March 1941	April 1941	
BG John N. Greely	April 1941	November 1941	
MG John C. H. Lee	6 November 1941	8 May 1942	World War II
MG Walter M. Robertson	9 May 1942	June 1945	World War II
BG William K. Harrison	June 1945	September 1945	World War II
MG Edward M. Almond	September 1945	May/June 1946	
MG Paul W. Kendall	May/June 1946	24 May 1948	
BG Ira P. Swift	25 May 1948	29 June 1948	
MG Harry J. Collins	30 June 1948	April 1950	
MG Laurence B. Keiser	April 1950	December 1950	
MG Robert B. McClure	December 1950	January 1951	
MG Clark L. Ruffner	January 1951	August 1951	
BG Thomas E. deShazo	August 1951	September 1951	
MG Robert N. Young	September 1951	May 1952	
MG James C. Fry	May 1952	May 1953	
MG William L. Barriger	May 1953	March 1954	
MG John F. R. Seitz	March 1954	August 1954	
MG Robert L. Howze Jr.	August 1954	September 1954	
MG Thomas S. Timberman	September 1954	August 1955	
MG Paul L. Freeman, Jr.	August 1955	August 1956	
MG James F. Collins	August 1956	February 1957	
BG John F. Ruggles	February 1957	February 1957	
MG Gilman C. Mudgett	February 1957	June 1958	
BG Miller O. Perry	June 1958	July 1958	
MG Robert H. Wienecke	July 1958	February 1960	
BG Miller O. Perry	February 1960	February 1960	
BG William L. Hardick	February 1960	March 1960	
MG Frederick W. Gibb	March 1960	June 1961	
BG William L. Hardick	June 1961	July 1961	
BG Charles H. White Jr.	July 1961	August 1961	
BG Royal Reynolds Jr.	August 1961	August 1961	
MG Charles H. Chase	August 1961	September 1962	
MG Charles Billingslea	September 1962	September 1964	
MG John H. Chiles	September 1964	July 1965	
MG Hugh M. Exton	July 1965	August 1965	
BG Robert R. Williams	August 1965	August 1965	
MG John H. Chiles	August 1965	July 1966	
MG George B. Pickett Jr.	July 1966	May 1967	
MG Frank M. Izenour	May 1967	June 1968	
MG Leland G. Cagwin	June 1968	September 1969	
MG Salve H. Matheson	September 1969	October 1970	
MG Gilbert H. Woodward	October 1970	October 1971	
MG Jeffery C. Smith	October 1971	May 1973	
MG Henry E. Emerson	May 1973	May 1975	
MG J. R. Thurman	May 1975	June 1976	
MG Morris J. Brady	June 1976	January 1978	
MG David E. Grange, Jr.	January 1978	June 1979	
MG Robert C. Kingston	June 1979	June 1981	
MG James H. Johnson	June 1981	November 1982	
BG Lee D. Brown	November 1982	December 1982	
BG Harison H. Williams	December 1982	December 1982	
MG James H. Johnson	December 1982	July 1983	
MG Henry Doctor	July 1983	August 1985	
MG Gary E. Luck	August 1985	December 1986	
MG Jack B. Farris	December 1986	June 1988	
MG Jack D. Woodall	June 1988	November 1989	
MG Caryl G. Marsh	November 1989	June 1991	
MG James T. Scott	June 1991	May 1993	
MG John N. Abrams	May 1993	March 1995	
MG Tommy R. Franks	March 1995	May 1997	
MG Michael B. Sherfield	May 1997	September 1998	
MG Robert F. Dees	September 1998	September 2000	
MG Russel L. Honoré	September 2000	July 2002	
MG John R. Wood	July 2002	September 2004	
MG George A. Higgins	September 2004	May 2006	
MG James A. Coggin	May 2006	November 2007	
MG John W. Morgan III	November 2007	October 2009	
MG Michael S. Tucker	October 2009	September 2011	
MG Edward C. Cardon	September 2011	June 2013	
MG Thomas S. Vandal	June 2013	April 2015	
MG Theodore D. Martin	April 2015	18 July 2017	
MG D. Scott McKean	18 July 2017	17 July 2019	
MG Steven W. Gilland	17 July 2019	18 May 2021	
MG David A. Lesperance	18 May 2021	15 May 2023	
MG William D. Taylor	15 May 2023	21 June 2024	
MG Charles T. Lombardo	21 June 2024	present	

=== Division Command Sergeants Major (CSMs) ===
Name	From	To	Comments
SGM Hughie Stover	July 1965	August 1965	(Reflagged from 1CD in Korea. Term as 2ID SGM starts at reflagging.)
SGM Robert L. Brown	August 1965	May 1966	
SGM Othon O. Valent	May 1966	September 1967	
SGM John A. Beckham	September 1967	March 1968	
CSM G.H. Cottrell	March 1968	February 1969	
CSM Robert M. Rowsey	February 1969	February 1970	
CSM Tobin	February 1970	December 1970	
CSM Jerome J. Szafranski	December 1970	December 1971	
CSM Wiliam O. Marshall	December 1971	December 1972	
CSM Warren S. Eichelberger	December 1972	May 1974	
CSM George H. Hamil	May 1974	December 1974	
CSM James P. Meade	December 1974	October 1976	
CSM Jose Q. Salas	October 1976	September 1977	
CSM Ralph Pritcher	September 1977	December 1978	
CSM Robert J. Berry	December 1978	February 1980	
CSM Rosvelt Martain	February 1980	July 1980	
CSM Willie Pitts Jr.	July 1980	December 1980	
CSM Donald L. Melvin	December 1980	October 1981	
CSM Simon Ramos	October 1981	June 1982	
CSM William J. McBride	June 1982	July 1983	
CSM Lee S. Rodriguez	July 1983	November 1984	
CSM Bobby C. Boothe	November 1984	October 1986	
CSM Billy R. Finney	October 1986	April 1988	
CSM Jimmie W. Spencer	April 1988	January 1990	
CSM William H. Acebes	January 1990	December 1991	
CSM Robert E. Hall	December 1991	November 1993	**(Later became 11th SMA 21 October 1997)
CSM John J. Beck	November 1993	June 1994	
CSM John W. Jones	June 1994	January 1996	
CSM Charles Jackson	January 1996	June 1997	
CSM Charles Fitzpatrick	June 1997	September 2000	
CSM Barry Wheeler	September 2000	November 2002	
CSM James Lucero	November 2002	August 2005	
CSM James A. Benedict	August 2005	October 2006	
CSM Brian Stall	October 2006	September 2008	
CSM Peter D. Burrowes	November 2008	January 2011	
CSM Michael P. Eyer	January 2011	February 2013	
CSM Andrew J. Spano	February 2013	October 2015	
CSM Edward W. Mitchell	October 2015	1 December 2017	
CSM Phil K. Barretto	1 December 2017	July 2020	
CSM Shawn F. Carns	July 2020	20 April 2022	
CSM Kenneth R. Franco	20 April 2022	Present	
