= Kevin Admiral =

American general

Kevin D. Admiral
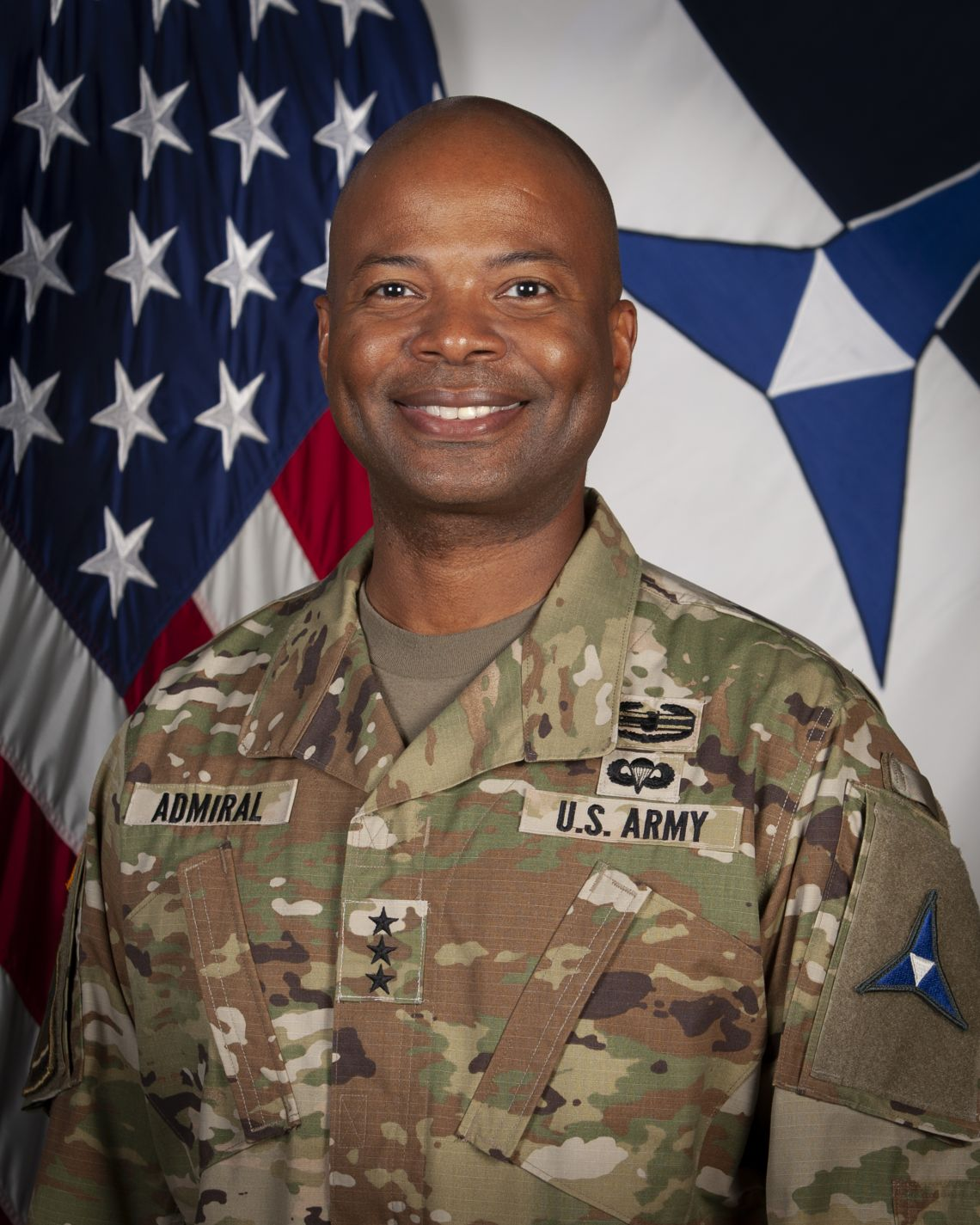
- Education: University of Kansas (BS); Joint Advanced Warfighting School (MS); Royal College of Defence Studies
- Spouse: Charmain Admiral
- Military career
- Allegiance: United States
- Branch: United States Army
- Service years: 1994–present
- Rank: Lieutenant General
- Commands: United States Army Europe and Africa; Allied Land Command; III Armored Corps; 1st Cavalry Division; United States Army Armor School; Task Force-Southeast; 3rd Cavalry Regiment; 1st Battalion, 36th Infantry Regiment
- Conflicts: War in Afghanistan
- Awards: Army Distinguished Service Medal; Defense Superior Service Medal; Legion of Merit (4); Bronze Star Medal (4); Purple Heart

Kevin D. Admiral is an American lieutenant general who has served as the commander of the III Armored Corps since 2024.

Admiral was commissioned as an Armor officer in 1994 from the University of Kansas Army Reserve Officers' Training Corps. His commands have included the 1st Battalion, 36th Infantry Regiment, and the 3rd Cavalry Regiment, which he led on separate deployments for the war in Afghanistan. Admiral also commanded Task Force Southeast in Afghanistan. He later served as the deputy commanding general (maneuver) of the 4th Infantry Division from 2018 to 2019, and as the commandant of the United States Army Armor School from 2019 to 2021.

He was the director of force management of the United States Army from 2021 to 2023. While serving as the commanding general of the 1st Cavalry Division from 2023 to 2024, he led the unit on a deployment to Poland.

== Early life and education ==
Admiral graduated from the University of Kansas in 1994 with a Bachelor of Science degree in cellular biology, and was commissioned as an Armor officer in the United States Army from the university's Army Reserve Officers' Training Corps. He later went on to graduate from the Joint Advanced Warfighting School with a Master of Science degree in Campaign Planning & Strategy, and also from the Royal College of Defence Studies in London.

== Military career ==
Admiral has served in Armor, Cavalry, Mechanized Infantry and Stryker formations during his career. He served as an OC/T at the National Training Center, small group instructor for the Armor Captain Career Course at Fort Knox, Kentucky, and aide-de-camp to the 36th chief of staff of the United States Army. His command assignments at every echelon from company through regiment includes two commands in combat; 1st Battalion, 36th Infantry Regiment and 3rd Cavalry Regiment in Afghanistan. He also led Task Force Southeast in Paktia Province, Afghanistan. In between those two commands, Admiral attended the Royal College of Defence Studies in London. He led the 3rd Cavalry from August 2015 to July 2017, and they deployed to Afghanistan from May 2016 to February 2017.

After leading the 3rd Cavalry, Admiral served as Executive Officer to the Commanding General of United Nations Command, ROK/US Combined Forces Command, US Forces Korea. He was later the deputy commanding general for maneuver of the 4th Infantry Division from 2018 to 2019, and commandant of the United States Army Armor School at Fort Benning, Georgia, from 2019 to 2021. Admiral served as director of force management of the United States Army from June 2021 to June 2023, and then as commander of the 1st Cavalry Division. After assuming command of the 1st Cavalry Division in July 2023, Admiral led the unit on a deployment to Poland.

In July 2024, Admiral was nominated for promotion to lieutenant general and assignment as commanding general of III Armored Corps and Fort Cavazos, Texas. He relinquished command of the 1st Cavalry Division in Poland on 2 August 2024, assumed command of III Armored Corps in Texas on 7 August 2024.

In July 2026, Admiral was nominated to become commanding general of United States Army Europe and Africa and commander of Allied Land Command. He was also nominated to remain with the grade of lieutenant general, as the position is being downgraded after previously being held by four-star generals.

== Dates of promotion ==
Rank	Branch	Date
Second lieutenant	Army	1994
First lieutenant	Army	
Captain	Army	
Major	Army	26 September 2003
Lieutenant colonel	Army	23 July 2008
Colonel	Army	25 September 2013
Brigadier general	Army	2 December 2019
Major general	Army	1 August 2022
Lieutenant general	Army	7 August 2024

== Personal life ==
He is married to Charmain, an Army veteran and attorney, and they have one daughter.

Military offices
Preceded by Cameron M. Cantlon	Commander of the 3rd Cavalry Regiment; 2015–2017	Succeeded by Jonathan C. Byrom
Preceded by David M. Hodne	Deputy Commanding General for Maneuver of the 4th Infantry Division; 2018–2019	Succeeded by John V. Meyer III
Preceded by David A. Lesperance	Commandant of the United States Army Armor School; 2019–2021	Succeeded by Thomas M. Feltey
Preceded by Peter N. Benchoff	Director of Force Management of the United States Army; 2021–2023	Succeeded by Eric S. Strong
Preceded by John B. Richardson IV	Commanding General of the 1st Cavalry Division; 2023–2024	Succeeded by Thomas Feltey
Preceded by Sean Bernabe	Commander of the III Armored Corps; 2024–present	Incumbent
