= John B. Richardson IV =

U.S. Army general

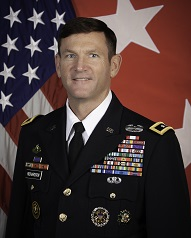
- Official portrait, 2024
- Born: April 17, 1968 (age 58); Baltimore, Maryland, U.S.
- Military career
- Allegiance: United States of America
- Branch: United States Army
- Service years: 1991–2024
- Rank: Major General
- Commands: 1st Cavalry Division; 3rd Cavalry Regiment; 5th Squadron, 4th Cavalry Regiment; Train, Advise, Assist Command- East (Afghanistan); 1st Squadron, 13th Cavalry Regiment; Headquarters and Headquarters Company, 1st Battalion, 34th Armored Regiment; C Company (Tank), 1st Battalion, 34th Armored Regiment
- Conflicts: Iraq War; War in Afghanistan; Operation Inherent Resolve
- Awards: Defense Superior Service Medal (2); Legion of Merit (3); Bronze Star Medal (3); Purple Heart

John Buchanan Richardson IV (born April 17, 1968) is a retired United States Army major general. He served as Commanding General of the 1st Cavalry Division from July 2021 to July 2023. and Deputy Commanding General of the III Corps from September 2, 2020, to July 2021. Before that, he served as the Deputy Chief of Staff for Operations, Plans, and Training of the United States Army Forces Command. Richardson is a 1991 graduate of the United States Military Academy.

== Early life ==
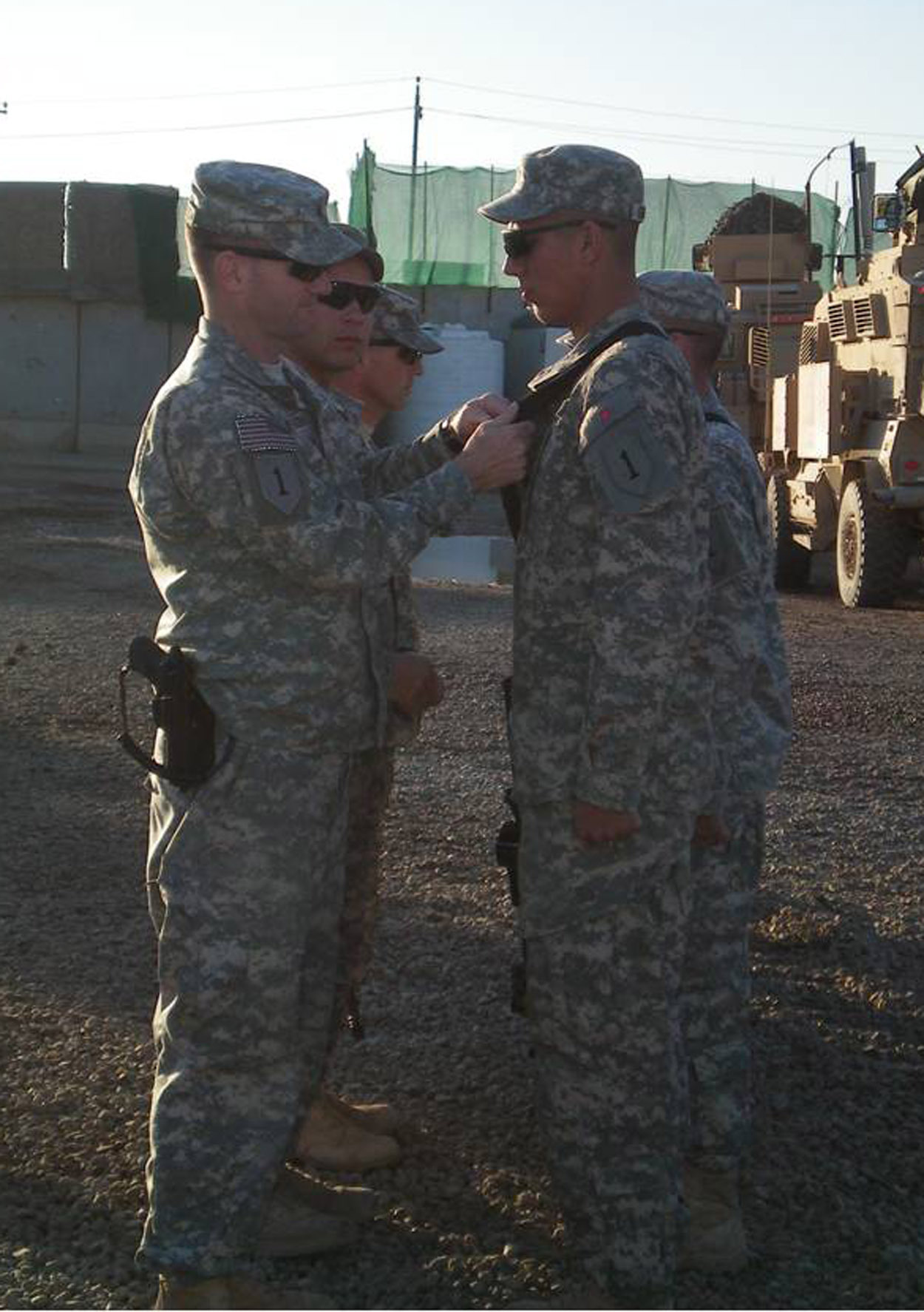
Richardson pins on Combat Action Badges and Purple Heart medals to cavalry troopers at Joint Security Station Ghazaliyah on December 12, 2008.

John B. Richardson IV was born in Baltimore, Maryland, to John B. Richardson III and Judith Ann Loucks. His father served in the Federal Bureau of Investigation and later became a Certified Public Accountant and Forensic Accountant. His mother is an Attorney. He grew up in Tallahassee, Florida and attended Maclay School where he held numerous student leadership positions, active in sports, and graduated in 1987. He was honored as Maclay's 2015 Distinguished Alumnus.

Richardson attended the U.S. Military Academy at West Point and graduated in 1991, the fifth member of his family to attend West Point. He comes from an "old Army" family on his paternal side going back four generations. His great-grandfather, Colonel John B. Richardson, Sr., earned the Distinguished Service Cross, the nation's second highest award for valor, during World War I, and his paternal grandfather served as an infantry battalion commander in the European Theater during World War II and commanded the 5th Cavalry Regiment in the 1st Cavalry Division in Japan and Korea 1953–54. His maternal grandparents were educators. His maternal grandfather, Dr. H. Donald Loucks, graduated from the University of Florida, completed ROTC and served as a math professor and basketball coach at West Point, then a professor of physical education and the first NCAA basketball and tennis coach at Florida State University and was a 1985 inductee into the FSU Athletic Hall of Fame. His paternal grandmother graduated from Wellesley College, and his maternal grandmother graduated from Florida State College for Women.

== Personal life ==
Richardson married his high school sweetheart Deanie in 1991 after her graduation from Florida State University, they have two children, Mary who attends Georgetown University Law and Johnny is an undergrad at University of Tennessee.

== Civilian education ==
- Bachelors in Military History: U.S. Military Academy at West Point
- Masters in Counseling and Leader Development: Long Island University
- Fellowship, Leadership & Management: Harvard University, Kennedy School

== Military education ==
- Armor Officer Basic and Advance Courses
- Command and General Staff College at Fort Leavenworth, Kansas
- Joint and Combined Warfighting School in Norfolk, Virginia

While attending Harvard University, in 2011 he published a monograph with a case study which provides a means for analyzing the complexity of organizational leadership: Real Leadership and the U.S. Army: Overcoming a Failure of Imagination to Conduct Adaptive Work (ISBN 9781304238597). The study presents a high-stakes problem set requiring an operational adaptation by a cavalry squadron in Baghdad, Iraq. This problematic reality triggers the struggle in finding a creative solution, as organizational culture serves as a barrier against overturning accepted norms that have proven successful in the past, even if they do not fit the current reality. The case study highlights leaders who are constrained by assumptions and therefore suffer the consequences of failing to adapt quickly to a changed environment. Emphasizing the importance of reflection, adaptation, and a willingness to experiment and assume prudent risk to seize opportunities, the case study transitions to an example of a successful application of adaptive leadership and adaptive work performed by the organization.

== Military career ==
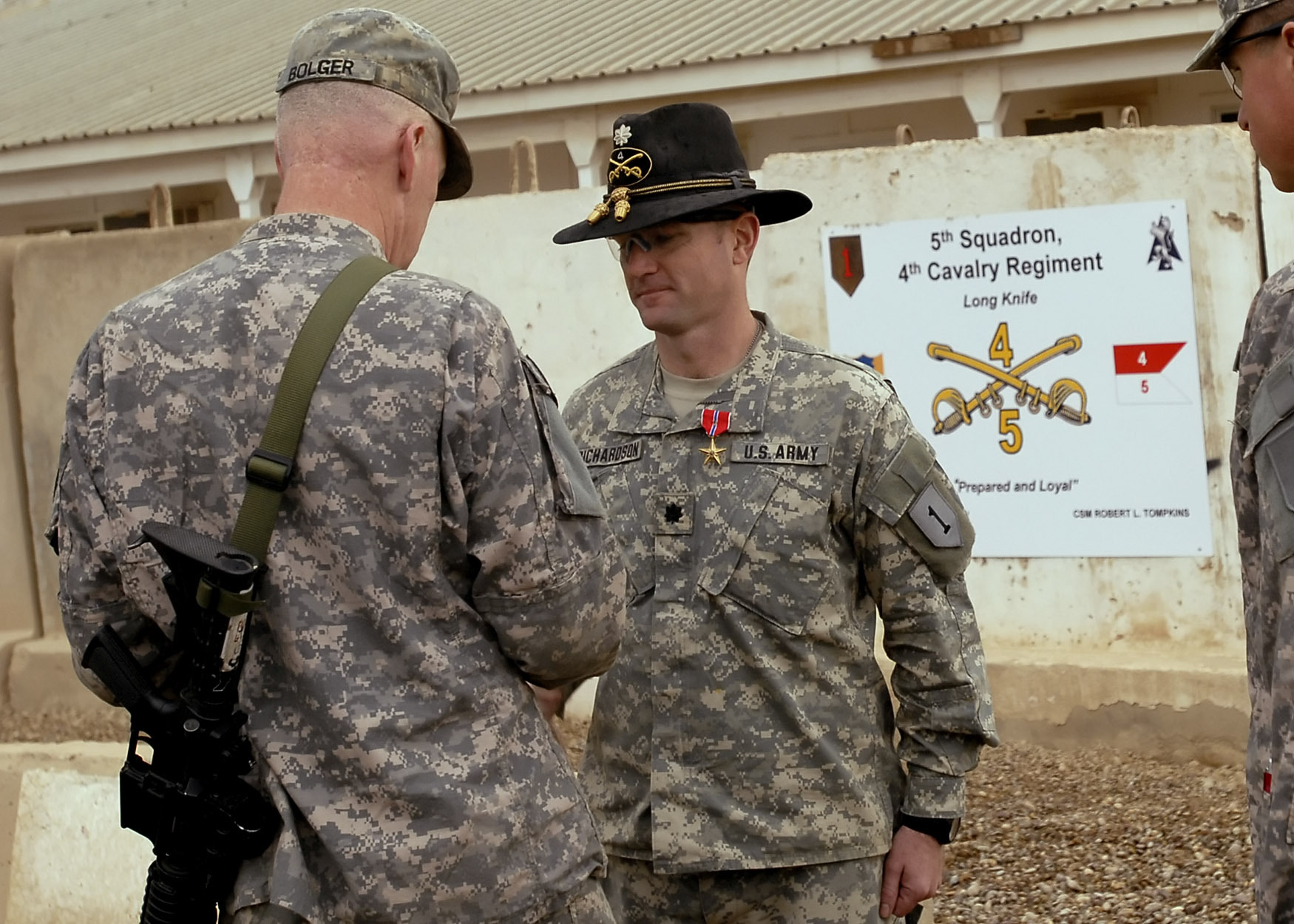
Richardson (right) is presented with the Bronze Star with 'V' device for valor by Major General Daniel Bolger on March 1, 2009 at Camp Liberty.

Richardson was commissioned as an Armor Officer in 1991 from the U.S. Military Academy at West Point. He is a proud Armored Cavalryman. His first assignment was with the 1st Armored Division serving as a tank platoon leader, tank company executive officer, and battalion maintenance officer in 4th Battalion, 67th Armored Regiment in Friedberg, Germany. He was next assigned to the 1st Infantry Division serving as a battalion adjutant, tank company commander, and headquarters and headquarters company commander with the 1st Battalion, 34th Armored Regiment at Fort Riley, Kansas. While assigned to 1st Infantry Division he deployed to Bosnia (IFOR) as the command liaison officer to the Nordic-Polish Brigade. He then served as a Company Tactical Officer at West Point.

As a major he was assigned to the 2d Armored Cavalry Regiment. In the 2d ACR he served as the squadron operations officer for 2d Squadron in Sadr City, Baghdad, Iraq 2003-2004. Upon re-deployment he served as the regimental operations officer for the 2d Armored Cavalry Regiment at Fort Polk, Louisiana. In 2005, he deployed a second time to Iraq as the Aide-de-Camp to the Commanding General of Multi-National Security Transition Command – Iraq. He then served as a Career Manager in Armor Branch at U.S. Army Human Resources Command.

As a lieutenant colonel from 2007 to 2009, he served as the squadron commander of 5th Squadron, 4th Cavalry Regiment in the 1st Infantry Division. During this command the squadron deployed to northwest Baghdad from 2008 to 2009. In 2011, he assumed command as the 74th Colonel of the 3d Cavalry Regiment (Brave Rifles) at Fort Hood, Texas. Following regimental command, he served in the Pentagon on the Joint Staff.

After the tour in the Pentagon he deployed to Iraq in the fight against ISIS in Mosul serving as the Deputy Commanding General for 1st Infantry Division/CJFLCC-Operation Inherent Resolve. Returning from his fourth combat tour in Iraq, he then served as the Deputy Commanding General for the 3rd Infantry Division where he deployed to Afghanistan and commanded Train, Advise, Assist Command-East (TAAC-East) in the fight against ISIS-K and the Taliban.

In June 2018, he returned to the Pentagon and served on the Army Staff as the Director for Readiness, Operations, and Mobilization in the G3/5/7. In June 2019, he served as the Deputy Chief of Staff, G3/5/7 for U.S. Forces Command at Fort Bragg, North Carolina.

In September 2020, Richardson assumed duties as the Deputy Commanding General for III Corps, Fort Hood, Texas following the aftermath of the April 2020 murder of Army Specialist Vanessa Guillen. Over the next year, Richardson would assist the III Corps Commander in leading the reforms recommended by the Fort Hood Independent Review Committee (FHIRC), to improve systemic issues of discipline, poor morale, and safety at the Nation's second largest Army installation. The ensuing III Corps "People First" initiatives would set a foundation for the Army's transition to an inter-war period and focused on balanced and holistic readiness (People/Equipment/Training) required during an era of Great Power competition.

He assumed command of the 1st Cavalry Division at Fort Hood, Texas on July 21, 2021. As a Cavalryman his warfighting philosophy is simple: Seize and maintain the initiative, attack, penetrate, exploit, pursue the enemy relentlessly, and win decisively.

In May 2023, Richardson was nominated for promotion to lieutenant general with assignment as commanding general of the First Army. His nomination was confirmed by the Senate in December 2023 however, he opted to retire in February 2024, before being promoted, after 33 years of active service.

After retirement he was selected by the Chief of Armor to serve as the Honorary Colonel of the 3rd Cavalry Regiment ("Brave Rifles").

Major General John Richardson, US Army (Retired), currently works for USAA. After retiring from the military, he became the Head of Military Affairs at USAA and recently assumed the role of Head of Policy and Strategic Alliances leading USAA's advocacy work to improve the lives of USAA Members and the greater military community.

== Awards and decorations ==
Combat Action Badge
Basic Parachutist Badge
Army Staff Identification Badge
Joint Chiefs of Staff Identification Badge
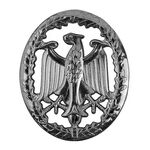
German Armed Forces Badge for Military Proficiency- Silver
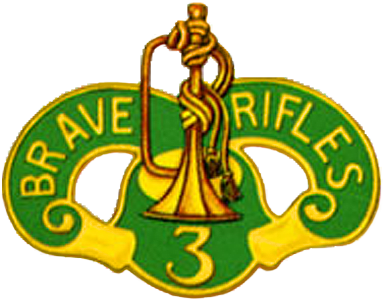
3rd Armored Cavalry Regiment Distinctive Unit Insignia
7 Overseas Service Bars
[[Image:|60px|alt=]]Army Distinguished Service Medal
Defense Superior Service Medal for Combat Service
Defense Superior Service Medal with one bronze oak leaf cluster
Legion of Merit for Combat Service
Legion of Merit (with 2 Bronze Oak Leaf Clusters)
Bronze Star Medal for Valor
Bronze Star Medal (with 2 Bronze Oak Leaf Clusters)
Purple Heart
Defense Meritorious Service Medal
Army Meritorious Service Medal (with 4 Bronze Oak Leaf Clusters)
Joint Service Commendation Medal
Army Commendation Medal (with 2 Bronze Oak Leaf Clusters)
Joint Service Achievement Medal
Army Achievement Medal (with 4 Bronze Oak Leaf Clusters)
Army Presidential Unit Citation
Joint Meritorious Unit Award(with 2 Bronze Oak Leaf Cluster)
Meritorious Unit Commendation(with 1 Bronze Oak Leaf Cluster)
Superior Unit Award (with 1 Bronze Oak Leaf Cluster)
National Defense Service Medal with 1 bronze service star
Armed Forces Expeditionary Medal
Afghanistan Campaign Medal (with 1 Campaign Star)
Iraq Campaign Medal (with 4 Campaign Stars)
Inherent Resolve Campaign Medal (with 2 Campaign stars)
Global War on Terrorism Expeditionary Medal
Global War on Terrorism Service Medal
Armed Forces Service Medal
Army Service Ribbon
Army Overseas Service Ribbon (with Award Numeral 4)
NATO Medal (with 2 Bronze Stars)
[[Image:|60px|alt=]] French Order of Merit - Officer
French National Defense Medal - Gold
Order of the Spur (Gold and Silver)
Order of St. George (Armor and Cavalry)
Order of St. Barbara (Field Artillery)
Order of St. Michael (Aviation)
Order of St. Maurice (Infantry)

Maclay School Distinguished Alumnus

Military offices
Preceded by Patrick E. Matlock	Deputy Director for Operations (Operations Team Four) of the Joint Staff; 2015–2016	Succeeded by Daniel R. Walrath
Preceded by Douglas A. Sims II	Director of Operations, Readiness and Mobilization of the United States Army; 2018–2019	Succeeded by Christopher C. LaNeve
Preceded by Antonio A. Aguto Jr.	Deputy Chief of Staff for Operations, Plans, and Training of the United States Army Forces Command; 2019–2020	Succeeded by Charles D. Costanza
Preceded by Scott L. Efflandt	Deputy Commanding General of III Corps; 2020–2021	Succeeded by Steven W. Gilland
Preceded by Jeffery D. Broadwater	Commanding General of the 1st Cavalry Division; 2021–2023	Succeeded by Kevin D. Admiral
