= List of commanders of 1st Cavalry Division (United States) =

Shoulder sleeve insignia of the US 1st Cavalry Division.

This is a list of commanders of the US 1st Cavalry Division of the United States Army.

- MG Robert L. Howze September 1921 – June 1925
- BG Joseph C. Castner June 1925 – January 1926
- MG Edwin B. Winans January 1926 – October 1927
- BG Samuel D. Rockenbach October 1927 – November 1927
- MG George Van Horn Moseley November 1927 – September 1929
- BG Charles J. Symmonds September 1929 – October 1930
- BG George C. Barnhardt October 1930 – December 1930
- MG Ewing E. Booth December 1930 – March 1932
- BG Walter Cowen Short March 1932 – March 1933
- MG Frank R. McCoy March 1933 – October 1933
- BG Walter Cowen Short October 1933 – April 1934
- BG Hamilton S. Hawkins III April 1934 – September 1936
- BG Francis L. Parker September 1936 – October 1936
- MG Ben Lear October 1936 – November 1938
- MG Kenyon A. Joyce November 1938 – October 1940
- MG Robert C. Richardson Jr. October 1940 – February 1941
- MG Innis Palmer Swift February 1941 – August 1944
- MG Verne D. Mudge August 1944 – February 1945
- BG Hugh F. T. Hoffman February 1945 – July 1945
- MG William C. Chase August 1945 – February 1949
- BG William B. Bradford February 1949 – February 1949
- MG John M. Devine February 1949 – August 1949
- BG Henry I. Hodes August 1949 – September 1949
- MG Hobart R. Gay September 1949 – February 1951
- MG Charles D. Palmer February 1951 – July 1951
- MG Thomas L. Harrold July 1951 – March 1952
- MG Arthur G. Trudeau March 1952 – March 1953
- BG William J. Bradley March 1953 – April 1953
- MG Joseph P. Cleland May 1953 – June 1953
- MG Armistead D. Mead June 1953 – December 1954
- BG Orlando C. Troxel Jr. December 1954 – May 1955
- MG Edward J. McGaw May 1955 – November 1956
- MG Edwin H. J. Carns November 1956 – August 1957
- MG Ralph W. Zwicker October 1957 – January 1958
- MG George E. Bush January 1958 – April 1959
- MG Charles E. Beauchamp April 1959 – May 1960
- MG Charles G. Dodge May 1960 – December 1960
- MG Frank H. Britton December 1960 – July 1961
- MG James K. Woolnough July 1961 – September 1962
- BG Donald C. Clayman September 1962 – October 1962
- MG Clifton F. Von Kann October 1962 – June 1963
- BG Charles P. Brown June 1963 – August 1963
- MG Charles Leonard August 1963 – October 1964
- MG Hugh M. Exton October 1964 – June 1965
- MG Harry W. O. Kinnard July 1965 – May 1966
- MG John Norton May 1966 – March 1967
- MG John J. Tolson March 1967 – August 1968
- BG Richard L. Irby August 1968 – August 1968
- MG George I. Forsythe August 1968 – April 1969
- MG Elvy B. Roberts May 1969 – May 1970
- MG George W. Casey Sr. May 1970 – July 1970
- MG George W. Putnam August 1970 – May 1971
- MG James C. Smith May 1971 – January 1973
- MG Robert M. Shoemaker January 1973 – February 1975
- MG Julius W. Becton Jr. February 1975 – November 1976
- MG W. Russell Todd November 1976 – November 1978
- MG Paul S. Williams Jr. November 1978 – November 1980
- MG Richard D. Lawrence November 1980 – July 1982
- MG Andrew P. Chambers July 1982 – June 1984
- MG Michael J. Conrad June 1984 – June 1986
- MG John J. Yeosock June 1986 – May 1988
- MG William F. Streeter May 1988 – July 1990
- MG John H. Tilelli Jr. July 1990 – July 1992
- MG Wesley K. Clark July 1992 – March 1994
- MG Eric K. Shinseki March 1994 – July 1995
- MG Leon J. LaPorte July 1995 – July 1997
- MG Kevin P. Byrnes July 1997 – October 1999
- MG David D. McKiernan October 1999 – October 2001
- MG Joe Peterson October 2001 – August 2003
- MG Peter W. Chiarelli August 2003 – November 2005
- MG Joseph F. Fil Jr. November 2005 – February 2008
- BG Vincent K. Brooks (Acting Commander) Feb – April 2008
- MG Daniel P. Bolger April 2008 – April 2010
- MG Daniel B. Allyn April 2010 – June 2012
- MG Anthony R. Ierardi June 2012 – March 2014
- MG Michael A. Bills March 2014 - January 2016
- MG John C. Thomson III January 2016 - October 2017
- MG Paul T. Calvert October 2017 - September 2019
- MG Jeffery Broadwater September 2019 - July 2021
- MG John B. Richardson July 2021 – July 2023
- MG Kevin D. Admiral July 2023 – August 2024
- MG Thomas M. Feltey August 2024 – August 2026
- BG Ethan J. Diven (Acting) August 2026 – October 2026
- BG Chad C. Chalfont October 2026 – Present
