= General Forsyth =

General Forsyth may refer to:

- James W. Forsyth (1834–1906), U.S. Army major general
- John Forsyth (general) (1867–1928), Australian Army major general

== See also ==
- George I. Forsythe (1918–1987), U.S. Army lieutenant general
