= Douglas Sims =

U.S. Army director of the Joint Staff (born 1968)

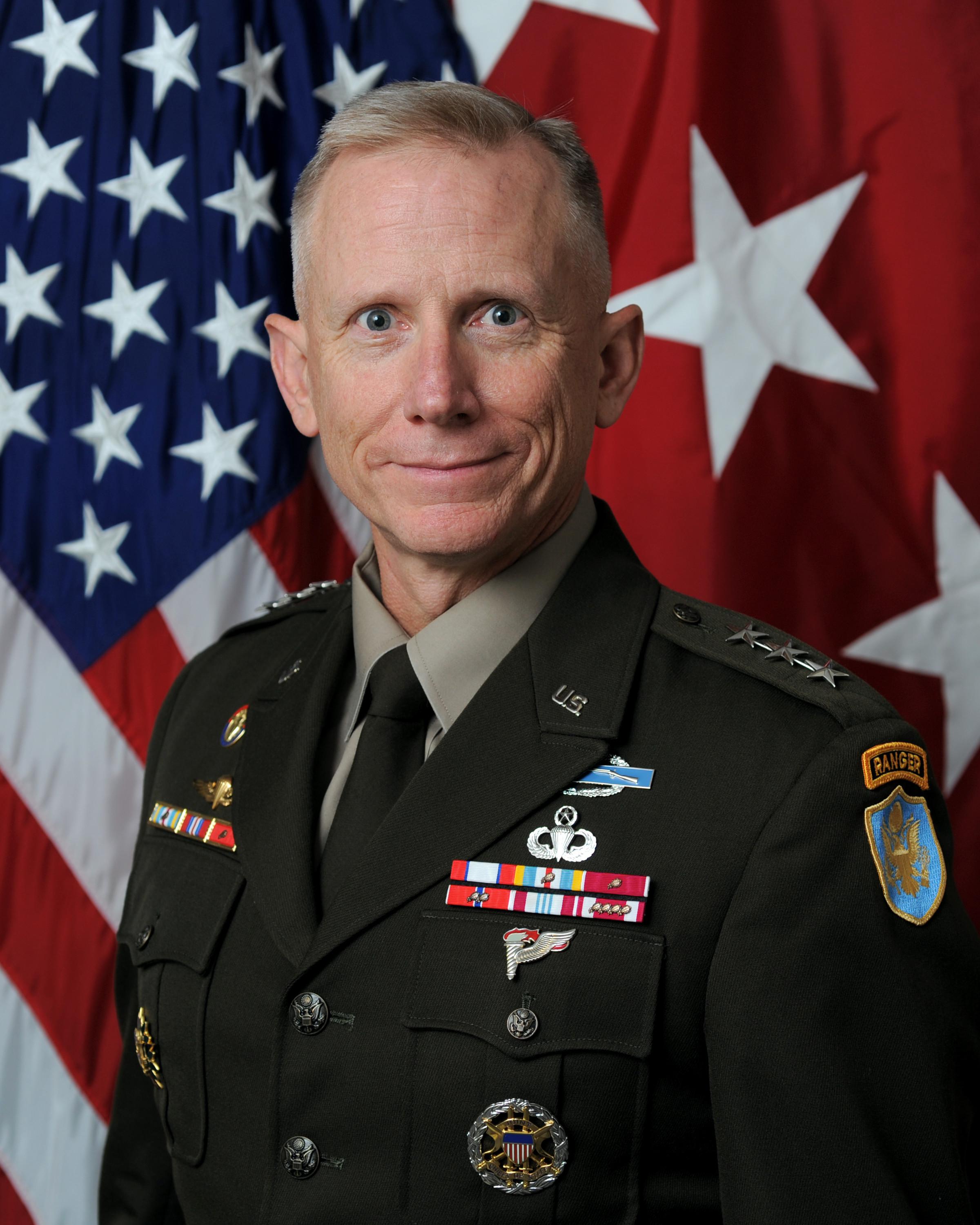
- Official portrait, 2022
- Education: United States Military Academy (BS); United States Army Command and General Staff College; Webster University (MA); Massachusetts Institute of Technology
- Military career
- Allegiance: United States
- Branch: United States Army
- Service years: 1987–2025
- Rank: Lieutenant General
- Nickname: DA
- Commands: 1st Infantry Division; 2nd Cavalry Regiment; 1st Squadron, 2nd Cavalry Regiment
- Conflicts: War in Afghanistan; Iraq War
- Awards: Army Distinguished Service Medal; Defense Superior Service Medal; Legion of Merit (2); Bronze Star Medal (3)
- Douglas Sims's voice Sims's opening statement at a House Appropriations subcommittee hearing on U.S. military aid to Ukraine; Recorded 28 February 2023

Douglas Arthur Sims II is a retired United States Army lieutenant general who last served as director of the Joint Staff from 2024 to 2025. He previously recently served as the director for operations of the Joint Staff from 2022 to 2024. Before that he was commanding general of the 1st Infantry Division at Fort Riley from 2020 to 2022 and deputy director for Regional Operations and Force Management of the Joint Staff from 2018 to 2020.

== Biography ==
Sims was commissioned as a second lieutenant in 1991 after graduating from the United States Military Academy with a Bachelor of Science degree in political science. His education also includes a Master of Arts degree in management from Webster University, the United States Army Basic and Advanced Infantry Officer Courses, and the United States Army Command and General Staff College.

From November 1991 to April 1994 he was a platoon leader in the 505th Infantry Regiment, 82nd Airborne Division, at Fort Bragg, North Carolina, and then until August 1995 he was a platoon leader in the 75th Ranger Regiment at Fort Lewis, Washington. Sims was a student at the United States Army Infantry School at Fort Benning, Georgia, between 1995 and 1996, and became an assistant professor of military science at the University of Pittsburgh in Pennsylvania from April 1996 to May 1998. He was then a battalion headquarters company commander in the 501st Parachute Infantry Regiment, 172nd Infantry Brigade, at Ford Richardson, Alaska, until February 2000. Between March 2000 and May 2001 Sims became the commander of C Company in the 3rd Infantry Regiment (The Old Guard), at Fort Myers, Virginia, and then the regimental assistant operations officer. After that, he was the aide-de-camp to the commanding general, United States Army Military District of Washington at Fort McNair, Washington, DC, until July 2002.

Sims was a student at the U.S. Army Command and General Staff College from August 2002 until June 2003, and then a battalion executive officer in the 5th Infantry Regiment, 1st Stryker Brigade, 25th Infantry Division, at Fort Lewis, Washington until June 2004. He was the operations officer of the 1st Stryker Brigade Combat Team and took part in the Iraq War during that time, until September 2005. Between then and May 2008 Sims held several positions at the United States Special Operations Command at MacDill Air Force Base, Florida. From July 2008 to January 2009 he was deputy commander of the 2nd Cavalry Regiment, stationed in Germany, and was deployed to Iraq again. After that, Sims became the commander of 1st Squadron, 2nd Cavalry Regiment until July 2011, and in the role had a deployment to Afghanistan. From August 2011 to June 2012 he was a Senior Service College Fellow in security studies at the Massachusetts Institute of Technology.

He was the commander of the 2nd Cavalry Regiment between January 2013 and July 2014, during which time he led it in Afghanistan, and after that he was the chief of staff of the 4th Infantry Division at Fort Carson, Colorado from August 2014 to July 2016. Sims was then the Deputy Commanding General (Support) of the 1st Cavalry Division until May 2017, with another deployment to Afghanistan. He was the U.S. Army Director for Operations, Readiness and Mobilization at the Army Staff from June 2017 to June 2018, before becoming the Deputy Director for Regional Operations and Force Management at the Joint Staff, The Pentagon, until June 2020. Sims commanded the 1st Infantry Division at Fort Riley, Kansas, from August 2020 to May 2022, and then was appointed as Director for Operations of the Joint Staff. In October 2023, Sims was nominated for appointment as Director of the Joint Staff, and took up the post in January 2024. Despite his nomination by the Army for his fourth star, defense secretary Pete Hegseth removed his nomination allegedly based on Sims’s previous work for General Mark Milley, a former Chairman of the Joint Chiefs, Sims retired from the Army at the end of September 2025, with over 34 years of service.

== Dates of promotion ==
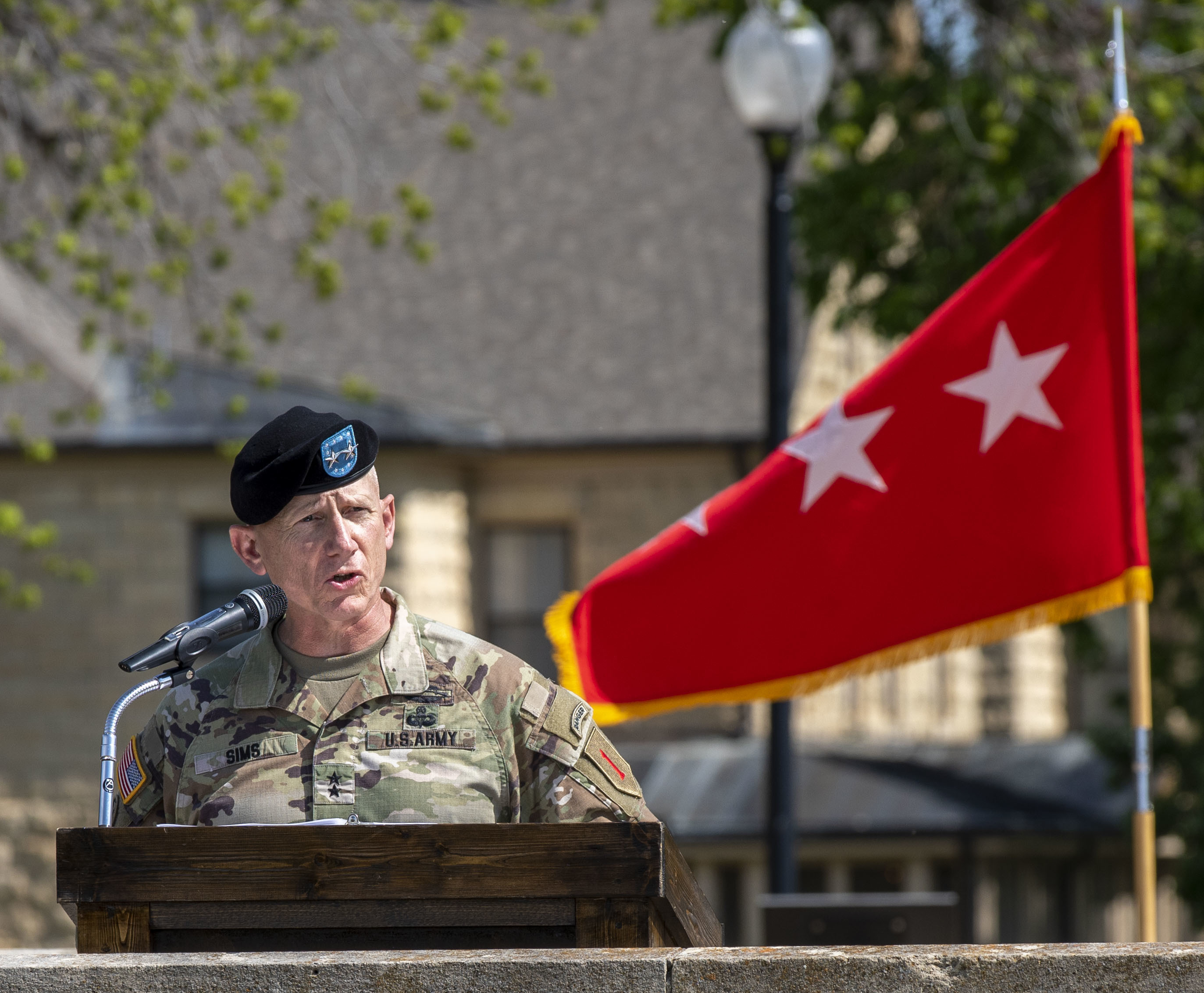
Sims at the change of command ceremony for the 1st Infantry Division, 2022

Rank	Branch	Date
Second lieutenant	Army	1 June 1991
First lieutenant	Army	1 June 1993
Captain	Army	1 June 1995
Major	Army	1 May 2002
Lieutenant colonel	Army	1 June 2007
Colonel	Army	1 October 2012
Brigadier general	Army	2 August 2017
Major general	Army	2 June 2020
Lieutenant general	Army	10 June 2022

Military offices
Preceded by Keith A. Barclay	Commander of the 2nd Cavalry Regiment; 2013–2014	Succeeded by John V. Meyer III
Preceded by Joseph McGee	Deputy Commanding General (Support) of the 1st Cavalry Division; 2016–2017	Succeeded by Matthew J. Van Wagenen
Preceded by Brian E. Winski	Director of Operations, Readiness and Mobilization of the United States Army; 2017–2018	Succeeded by John B. Richardson
Preceded by Randy George	Deputy Director of Regional Operations and Force Management of the Joint Staff; 2018–2020	Succeeded by William D. Taylor
Preceded by John W. O'Connor Jr. Acting	Commanding General of the 1st Infantry Division; 2020–2022	Succeeded by John V. Meyer III
Preceded by James Mingus	Director for Operations of the Joint Staff; 2022–2024	Succeeded by Alexus Grynkewich
Preceded by James Mingus	Director of the Joint Staff; 2024–2025	Succeeded by Stephen Liszewski; Acting
