= Patrick Matlock =

U.S. Army general

Patrick E. Matlock
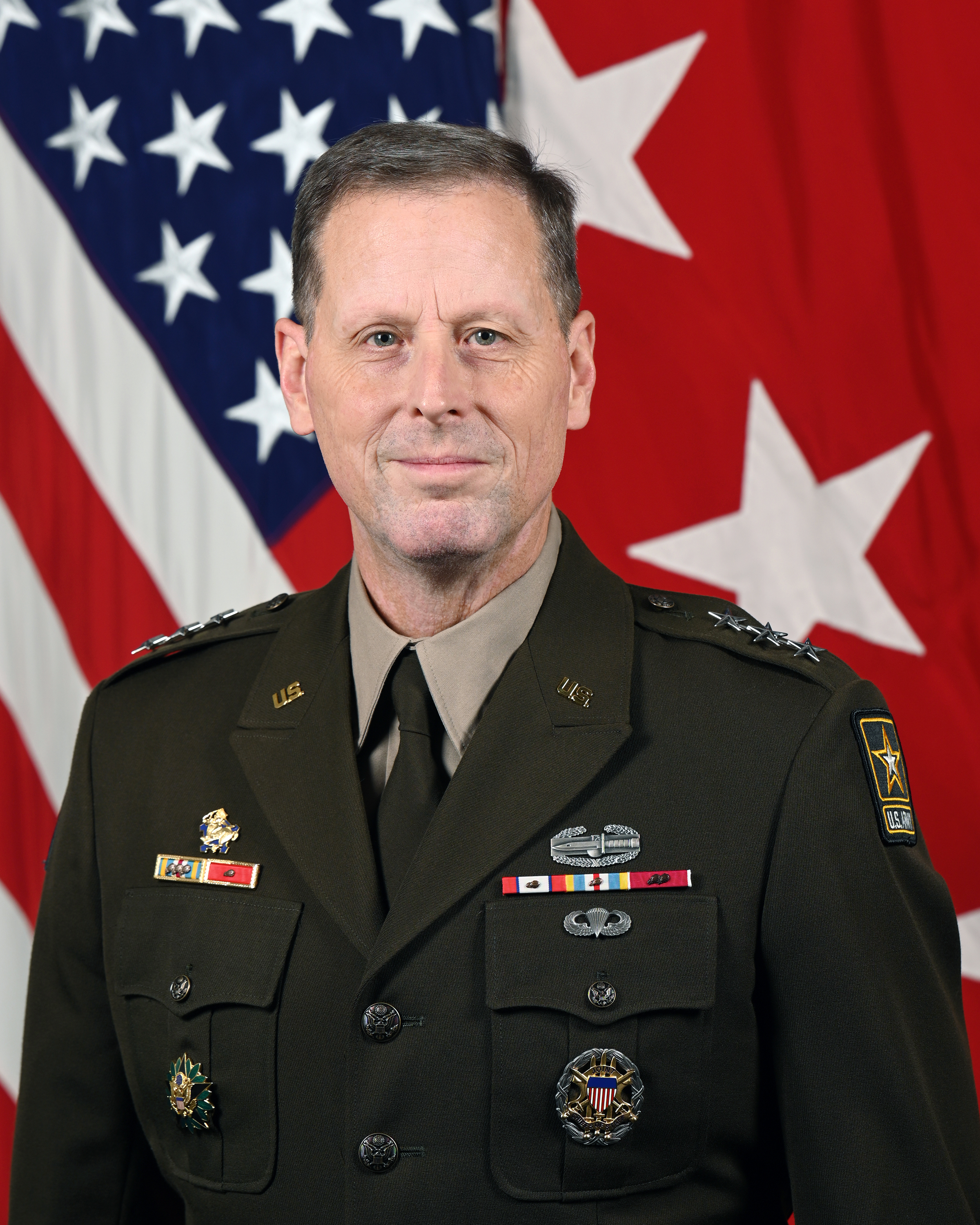
- Born: July 3, 1965 (age 61); Yuba City, California, U.S.
- Military career
- Allegiance: United States
- Branch: United States Army
- Service years: 1988–2024
- Rank: Lieutenant General
- Commands: 1st Armored Division; Fort Bliss; 170th Infantry Brigade Combat Team
- Conflicts: Gulf War; War in Afghanistan; Iraq War
- Awards: Army Distinguished Service Medal (2); Defense Superior Service Medal; Legion of Merit (3); Bronze Star Medal (3)

Patrick Ernest Matlock (born July 3, 1965) is a retired United States Army lieutenant general who last served as the Army's G-3/5/7 (deputy chief of staff for operations, plans and training) of the Army Staff from 2022 to 2024. (Note: Deputy Chief of Staff for Operations, Plans, and Training G-3/5/7. Both G-8 and G-3/5/7 sit on the Army Requirements Oversight Council (AROC), chaired by the Chief of Staff of the Army (CSA).: The Army's Force management model begins with a projection of the Future operating environment, in terms of resources: political, military, economic, social, information, infrastructure, physical environment, and the time available to bring the Current army to bear on the situation.; The AROC serves as a discussion forum of these factors.; A DOTMLPF analysis models the factors necessary to change the Current force into a relevant Future force.; The relevant strategy is provided by the Army's leadership to guide Army staff.; The resources are "dictated by Congress".; A JCIDS process identifies the gaps in capability between Current and Future force.; A Force design to meet the materiel gaps is underway.; An organization with the desired capabilities (manpower, materiel, training) is brought to bear on each gap.; AR 5-22(pdf) lists the Force modernization proponent for each Army branch, which can be a CoE or Branch proponent leader.; Staff uses a Synchronization meeting before seeking approval —HTAR Force Management 3-2b: "Managing change in any large, complex organization requires the synchronization of many interrelated processes".; A budget request is submitted to Congress.; Approved requests then await resource deliveries which then become available to the combatant commanders.) He most recently served as the Assistant Chief of Staff for Operations of the United Nations Command, ROK/US Combined Forces Command, and United States Forces Korea. Previously, he was the Commanding General of the 1st Armored Division.

== Military career ==
Born in Yuba City, California, Matlock graduated from the United States Military Academy with a B.S. degree in 1988 and was assigned to the 1st Cavalry Division at Fort Hood.

Matlock was nominated and confirmed for promotion to lieutenant general in April 2021, but he never assumed the rank. In September 2022, he was again nominated and confirmed for promotion to lieutenant general and appointment as deputy chief of staff for operations, plans, and training of the U.S. Army.

== Personal life ==
Matlock married Jacqueline Damaris "Jacqy" Franks on September 12, 1992. She is the daughter of General Tommy Franks. Matlock and his wife have three children.

== Notes ==
Military offices
Preceded by Malcolm B. Frost	Deputy Director for Operations (Operations Team Four) of the Joint Staff; 2014–2015	Succeeded by John B. Richardson
Preceded by Gary Brito	Deputy Commanding General (Support) of the 25th Infantry Division; 2015–2016	Succeeded by Peter B. Andrysiak
Preceded by John P. Johnson	Director of Training of the United States Army; 2016–2018	Succeeded by Charles D. Costanza
Preceded by Robert P. White	Commanding General of the 1st Armored Division; 2018–2020	Succeeded by Matthew L. Eichburg
Preceded by Willard Burleson	Assistant Chief of Staff for Operations of the United Nations Command, ROK/US Combined Forces Command, and United States Forces Korea; 2020–2021	Succeeded by Lonnie G. Hibbard
Preceded by James Rainey	Deputy Chief of Staff for Operations, Plans, and Training of the United States Army; 2022–2024	Succeeded by Joseph A. Ryan
