= William D. Taylor (general) =

U.S. Army general

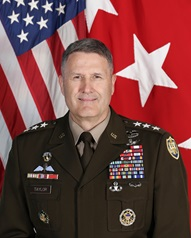
- Official portrait, 2025
- Military career
- Allegiance: United States
- Branch: United States Army
- Service years: 1988–present
- Rank: Lieutenant General
- Nickname: Hank
- Commands: U.S. Military Representative to the NATO Military Committee; 2nd Infantry Division; United States Army Operational Test Command; 2nd Combat Aviation Brigade; 2nd Squadron, 17th Cavalry Regiment
- Conflicts: War in Afghanistan; Iraq War
- Awards: Legion of Merit (4); Bronze Star Medal

William D. "Hank" Taylor is a United States Army lieutenant general who has served as the United States Military Representative to the NATO Military Committee since November 2025. He most recently served as director of operations of United Nations Command, ROK/US Combined Forces Command and United States Forces Korea from 2024 to 2025. He previously served as commanding general of the 2nd Infantry Division from 2023 to 2024. Prior to this, he previously served as Director of Army Aviation of the United States Army from 2022 to 2023, and as the Deputy Director for Regional Operations and Force Management of the Joint Staff from 2020 to 2022, as well as the Senior Advisor to the Ministry of Defense of Afghanistan.

Taylor enlisted in the United States Army in 1988 and was commissioned in 1990. He completed a bachelor's degree at Brigham Young University in 1991 and reported for flight training. Taylor later earned a Master of Science degree in exercise physiology from Brigham Young University.

In April 2024, Taylor was assigned as the director of operations of United Nations Command, ROK-U.S. Combined Forces Command, and United States Forces Korea.

In October 2025, Taylor admitted that he used ChatGPT in his non-field command decision making, noting "Chat and I" have become "really close lately."

Military offices
Preceded by ???	Deputy Commanding General (Maneuver) of the 1st Cavalry Division; 2017–2018	Succeeded by Christopher R. Norrie
Preceded by John C. Ulrich	Commanding General of the United States Army Operational Test Command; 2018–2019	Succeeded by Ronald R. Ragin
Preceded by Frank W. Tate	Senior Advisor to the Ministry of Defense of Afghanistan; 2019–2020	Succeeded by William A. Ryan III
Preceded by Douglas Sims II	Deputy Director for Regional Operations and Force Management of the Joint Staff; 2020–2022	Succeeded by Clair A. Gill
Preceded by Clair A. Gill	Director of Army Aviation of the United States Army; 2022–2023	Succeeded by Walter T. Rugen
Preceded by David Lesperance	Commanding General of the 2nd Infantry Division; 2023–2024	Succeeded by Charles T. Lombardo
Preceded by David Lesperance	Director of Operations of the United Nations Command, ROK/US Combined Forces Command and United States Forces Korea; 2024–present	Incumbent
