= Charles Costanza =

U.S. Army general

Lieutenant General Charles D. Costanza
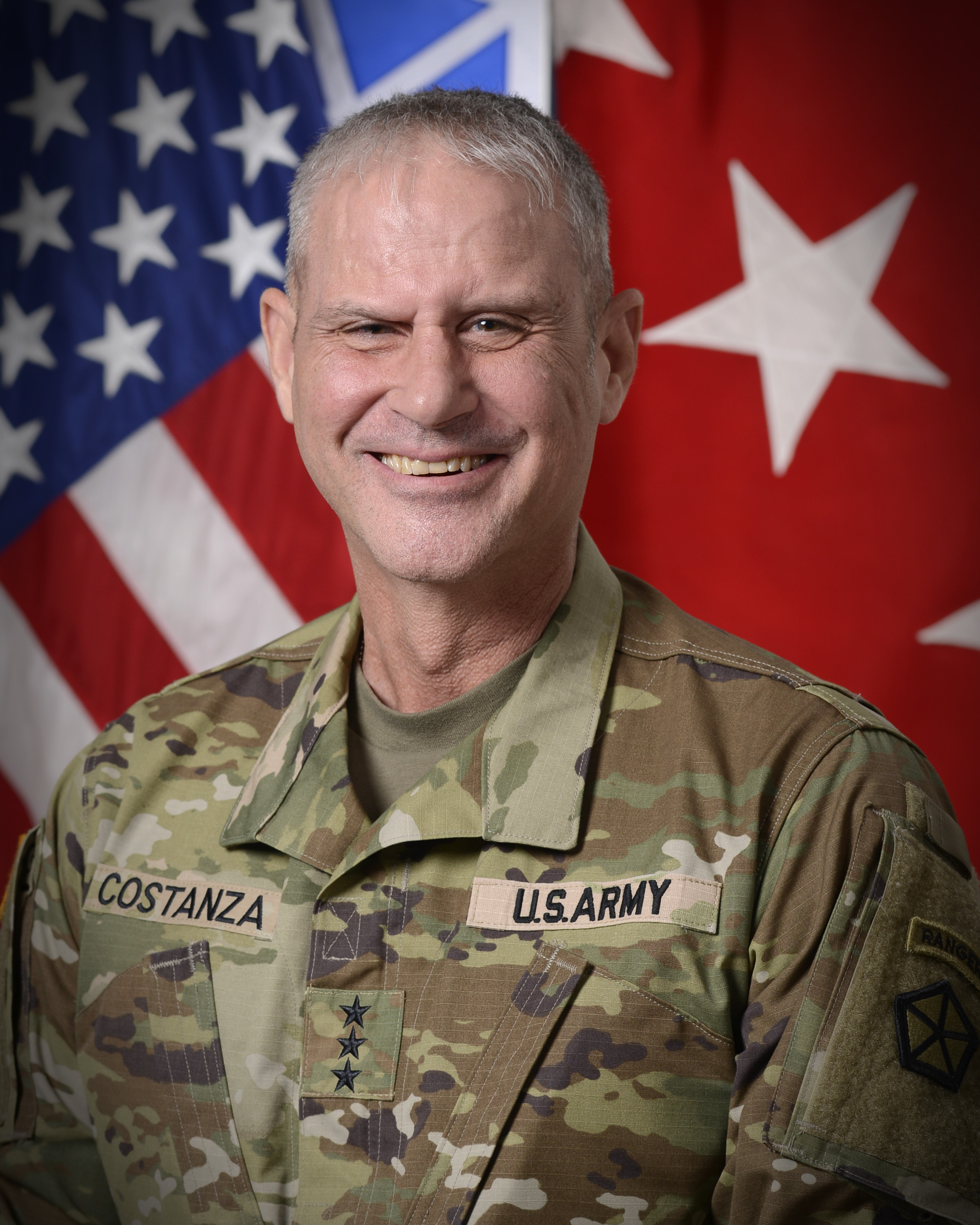
- Born: 30 April 1969 (age 57); Colorado, United States
- Education: United States Military Academy (BS); American Military University (MA); United States Army Command and General Staff College (MMAS)
- Military career
- Allegiance: United States
- Branch: United States Army
- Service years: 1991–present
- Rank: Lieutenant General
- Commands: V Corps; 3rd Infantry Division; 3rd Armored Brigade Combat Team, 3rd Infantry Division; 1st Squadron, 7th Cavalry Regiment
- Conflicts: Iraq War; Operation Inherent Resolve
- Awards: Defense Distinguished Service Medal; Legion of Merit (3); Bronze Star Medal (3)

Charles David Costanza (born 30 April 1969) is a United States Army lieutenant general who recently served as the commanding general of V Corps from April 8, 2024 to August 6, 2026. He most recently served as the commanding general of the 3rd Infantry Division from 2021 to 2023. He previously served as deputy chief of staff for operations, plans and training of the United States Army Forces Command from June 2020 to June 2021, with tours as deputy commanding general for support of the 1st Armored Division from June 2017 to June 2018 and commander of the 3rd Armored Brigade Combat Team, 3rd Infantry Division from May 2013 to May 2015.

In July 2023, Costanza was nominated for promotion to lieutenant general with assignment as the commanding general of V Corps.

In August 2026, Costanza was removed early from command of V Corps.

Military offices
Preceded by Patrick Matlock	Director of Training of the United States Army; 2018–2020	Succeeded by Scott M. Naumann
Preceded by John B. Richardson	Deputy Chief of Staff for Operations, Plans, and Training of the United States Army Forces Command; 2020–2021	Succeeded by Christopher C. LaNeve
Preceded by Antonio Aguto	Commanding General of the 3rd Infantry Division; 2021–2023	Succeeded by Christopher R. Norrie
Preceded by John S. Kolasheski	Commanding General of V Corps; 2024–present	Incumbent
