= Project VOLAR =

1970s U.S. Army project

Project VOLAR, or Project Volunteer Army, was an American series of experiments designed to determine how to successfully transition the U.S. Army to total volunteerism. Its primary mission was to determine how to increase volunteer enlistment and retention. It did so by evaluating the values most important to service members. The project took place in response to the imminent abolishment of the draft, so as to maintain the Army's strength without conscription. The project was created and sponsored by the Special Assistant for the Modern Volunteer Army, a program of the United States Army. It was conducted throughout 1971.

== Origins ==
In 1969, President Richard Nixon established the President's Commission on an All-Volunteer Armed Force to develop a plan to return to an all-volunteer military where the national civil-political discourse implied the imminent evolution towards a volunteer army. The U.S. Army relied heavily on the Military Selective Service Act to satisfy enlistment. Additionally, re-enlistment rates were at an all-time low. On October 13, 1970, General William Westmoreland announced his intentions to appoint an officer to oversee an Army program to move towards an all-volunteer force. General George I. Forsythe was then appointed as the Special Assistant for the Modern Volunteer Army (SAMVA). The Army staff and the Office of the Secretary of Defense subsequently established their goals to increase recruiting efforts and to secure the retention of enlistees. On January 1, 1971, Project VOLAR was launched. The Army began to financially emphasize its desire to move towards an all-volunteer force. The experiments of improving military quality of life were conducted at several forts, but the three most central were Fort Benning, Fort Carson, and Fort Ord.

== Intentions ==
In November 1970, General Westmoreland wrote a message to Army commanders, in which he provided detailed guidance on transitioning to a volunteer army. Westmoreland wrote specifically that "unnecessary elements and unattractive features of Army life" must be eliminated, and that they must "leave no stone unturned". Additionally, Westmoreland articulated his wishes that the recruitment and retention system should deal with people as individuals, on more personal levels. Army leaders desired not only basic improvements in the quality of Army life, but also in the standards of Army professionalism. The project needed to create substantive policies to do so. The project also needed to focus on the shifting cultural patterns of American youth, and determine precisely how their values intersected with the potential for their military enlistment.

== Program ==
Project VOLAR entailed three field experiments, each with its own attempts to improve soldiers' living conditions. Besides Forts Benning, Carson, and Ord, the project was expanded to include Fort Bragg and assorted troop centers in Europe.

At Fort Carson, Major General Bernard Rogers had developed a program to increase retention, which was successful and had retention rates up by 45% in ten months. This program included nicer living conditions - specifically barracks with more privacy – and replaced soldiers with civilians to do menial tasks, such as kitchen duty. Based on this program, the VOLAR program manifested with seven goals for the forts:

1. Higher standards of professionalism
2. Higher job satisfaction
3. Higher job appeal
4. Elimination of "makework"
5. Elimination of the veneration of statistics
6. Less emphasis on inspections
7. Better working conditions

Additionally, numerous slogans were created as part of Project VOLAR. Among the most notable were: "The Army is Changing – For the Better" and "Today's Army Wants to Join You".

== Findings ==
Project VOLAR was concluded on June 30, 1972.

At Fort Benning, the study found that the most significant "impact items" for enlistees included kitchen duty, individuality, dining hours, and policies concerning beer and hats. Among the most significant impact items for officers also included kitchen duty, policies of hats, and dining hours. The top impact item for officers was the availability of sewing supplies available to them. The result of Project VOLAR's implementations was an increased perception of actions being taken to improve Army life.

At Fort Bragg, soldiers had the most improved satisfaction with Project VOLAR's revised policies concerning the five-day work week, kitchen duty, and less strict pass policies.

At Fort Carson, a questionnaire distributed throughout 1971 to officers had several findings; most notably that there was lack of agreement that Project VOLAR was meeting its goals of improving military quality. Yet, there was also general acceptance of the Project VOLAR's concept, goals, and presence. The questionnaire also found that the most important items considered necessary to achieve the project's goals were satisfaction with job position, promotions based on merit, adequate equipment, and less emphasis on tedious work. The program there resulted in an upward trend of reenlistment, especially among men with less than two years in the army.

The project also tracked fort morale at Fort Ord. Throughout the entirety of the project, several nine-week measurements were taken. The results were compiled and found that morale increased significantly over the course of nine weeks.

The combined results from the forts which were a part of Project VOLAR were compiled into classes of conditions, or values which were ranked, by their influence on an individual's decision to serve or continue serving in the army. Factors that were of major influence for retention in the army were: consideration for the individual, personal security, interesting and satisfying work, and the conditions of reenlistment. Factors of major influence for leaving the army were: red tape, overtime work, the risk of physical danger, the reaction of the general public to the military, and the state of the then-present Vietnam War.

The findings of Project VOLAR were especially valuable to the U.S. Army when conscription was discontinued in 1973, and were used to continue recruiting for an all-volunteer army force.

== Notes ==
Citations

References

- Rostker, Bernard. I Want You!: the Evolution of the All-Volunteer Force. Santa Monica, CA: RAND, 2006.
- United States. Department of the Army. Building a Volunteer Army: the Fort Ord Contribution. By Harold G. Moore and Jeff M. Tuten. Washington: U.S. Dept. of Defense, Dept. of the Army, 1976.
- United States. Office of the Chief of Research and Development. Summary and Review of Studies of the VOLAR Experiment, 1971: Installation Reports for Forts Benning, Bragg, Carson, and Ord, and HumRRO Permanent Party Studies. By Robert Vineberg and Elaine N. Taylor. Washington, D.C.: Human Resources Research Organization, 1972.
- United States. United States Army. Final Evaluation Report on Fort Ord Project VOLAR. By William E. Datel. Washington, D.C.: Walter Reed Army Institute of Research, 1978.
