= Scott McKean =

D. Scott McKean
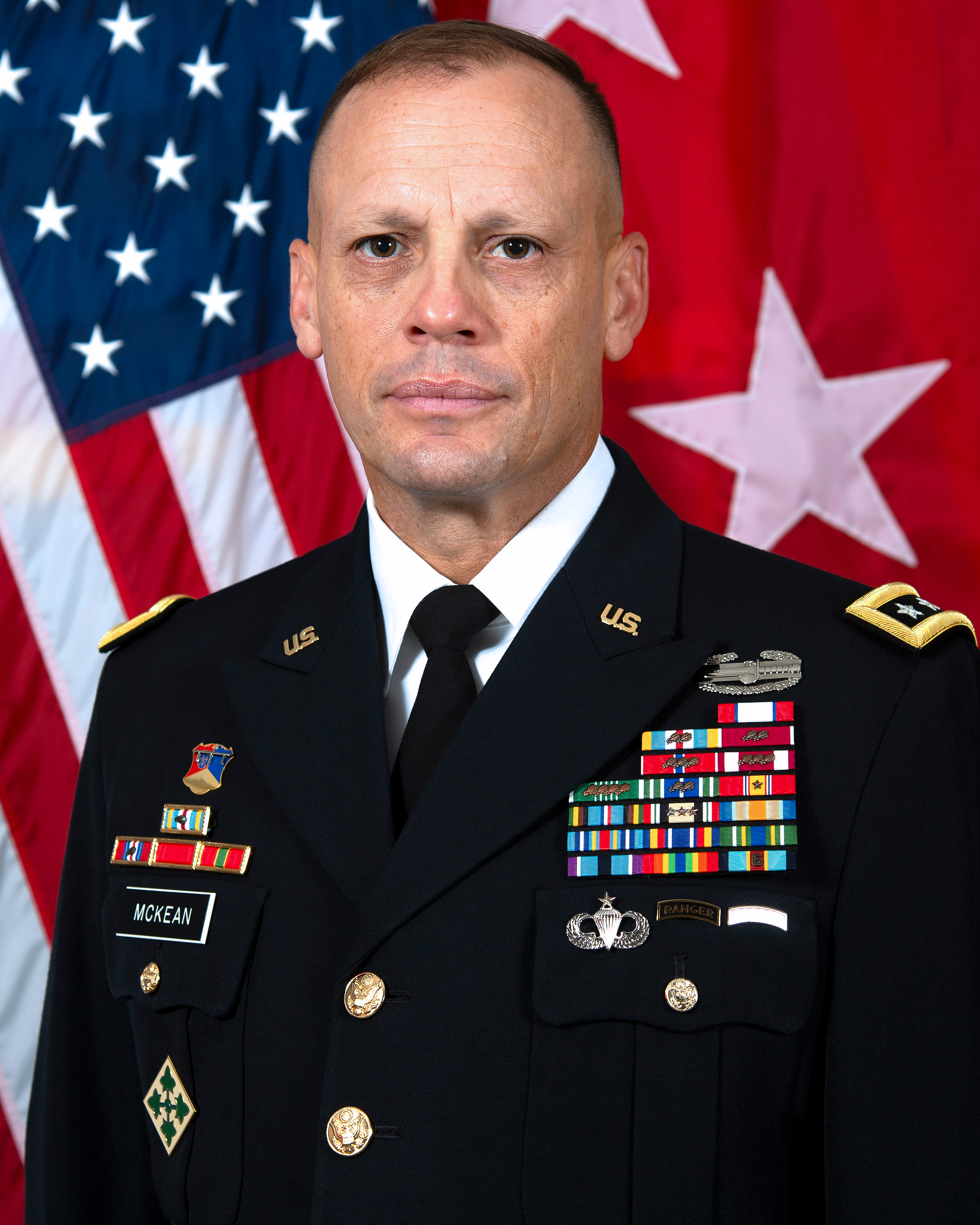
- Lieutenant General Scott McKean
- Born: September 25, 1968 (age 58); San Mateo County, California, U.S.
- Military career
- Allegiance: United States
- Branch: United States Army
- Service years: 1990–2022
- Rank: Lieutenant General
- Commands: 2nd Infantry Division; 4th Armored Brigade Combat Team, 1st Armored Division; 1st Battalion, 66th Armor Regiment
- Conflicts: Iraq War: Operation New Dawn; Operation Inherent Resolve
- Awards: Army Distinguished Service Medal (2); Defense Superior Service Medal (3); Legion of Merit (3); Bronze Star Medal (4)

Dennis Scott McKean is a retired United States Army lieutenant general who last served as deputy commanding general for Army Futures Command and the Director, Futures and Concepts Center. He previously served as the chief of staff for United States Central Command.

== Early life and education ==
McKean was born in San Mateo County, California, and raised in San Jose, California. He graduated from Bellarmine College Preparatory in 1986. McKean was commissioned as an armor officer in 1990 from the United States Military Academy at West Point.

== Military career ==
Colonel Scott McKean (right) talks with an Iraqi Police major, 2011

McKean's previous assignments include tank platoon leader and company executive officer in the 3rd Battalion, 73rd Armor Regiment and operations officer for the XVIII Airborne Corps Long Range Surveillance Company at Fort Bragg, North Carolina, as well as posts at Camp Red Cloud, Korea. He was also a tank company commander and headquarters company commander in the 4th Battalion, 64th Armor Regiment at Fort Stewart, Georgia.

McKean served as the operations officer and executive officer for the 1st Battalion, 67th Armored Regiment, 4th Infantry Division, during his deployment to Iraq. Later, he assumed duty as the deputy G3, 4th Infantry Division and deployed to Baghdad. He then commanded the 1st Battalion, 66th Armor Regiment and deployed back to Baghdad. He deployed again as the commander of the 4th Armored Brigade Combat Team, 1st Armored Division in 2011 as part of Operation New Dawn in Iraq.

Before his assignment at United States Central Command, McKean was assigned as the commanding officer of the 2nd Infantry Division.

== Personal life ==
McKean is married with two children.

== Awards and decorations ==
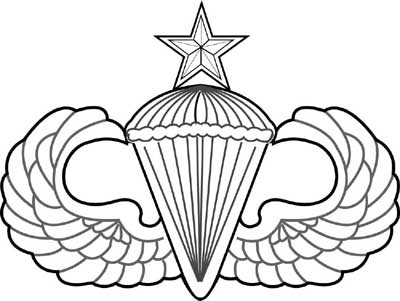
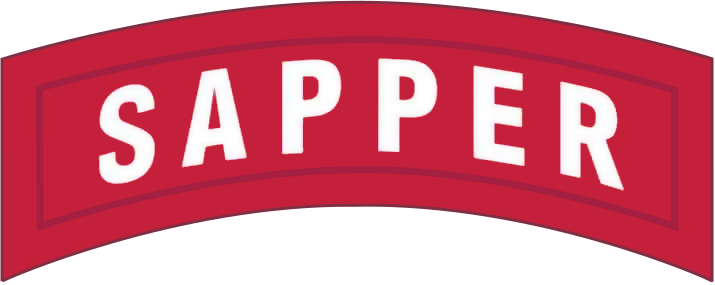
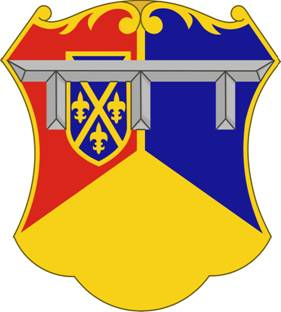
Combat Action Badge
Senior Parachutist Badge
Ranger Tab
Sapper Tab
4th Infantry Division Shoulder Sleeve Insignia
66th Armor Regiment Distinctive Unit Insignia
10 Overseas Service Bars

Army Distinguished Service Medal with bronze oak leaf cluster
Defense Superior Service Medal with two oak leaf clusters
Legion of Merit with two oak leaf clusters
Bronze Star Medal with three oak leaf clusters
Meritorious Service Medal with three oak leaf clusters
Army Commendation Medal with four oak leaf clusters
Army Achievement Medal with two oak leaf clusters
Joint Meritorious Unit Award with oak leaf cluster
Valorous Unit Award with oak leaf cluster
Meritorious Unit Commendation
Superior Unit Award
National Defense Service Medal with one bronze service star
Armed Forces Expeditionary Medal
Iraq Campaign Medal with seven campaign stars
Inherent Resolve Campaign Medal
Global War on Terrorism Expeditionary Medal
Global War on Terrorism Service Medal
Korea Defense Service Medal
Humanitarian Service Medal
Army Service Ribbon
Army Overseas Service Ribbon with bronze award numeral 6

Military offices
Preceded by Leopoldo A. Quintas	Commandant of the United States Army Armor School; 2014–2016	Succeeded by John S. Kolasheski
Preceded by Paul J. LaCamera	Chief of the Office of Security Cooperation-Iraq; 2016–2017	Succeeded by Bradley A. Becker
Preceded by Theodore D. Martin	Commanding General of the 2nd Infantry Division; 2017–2019	Succeeded by Steven W. Gilland
Preceded by Michael E. Kurilla	Chief of Staff of the United States Central Command; 2019–2020	Succeeded by Patrick D. Frank
Preceded by Eric J. Wesley	Deputy Commanding General for Futures and Concepts of the United States Army Futures Command; 2020–2024	Succeeded by David M. Hodne
