= John S. Kolasheski =

U.S Army general

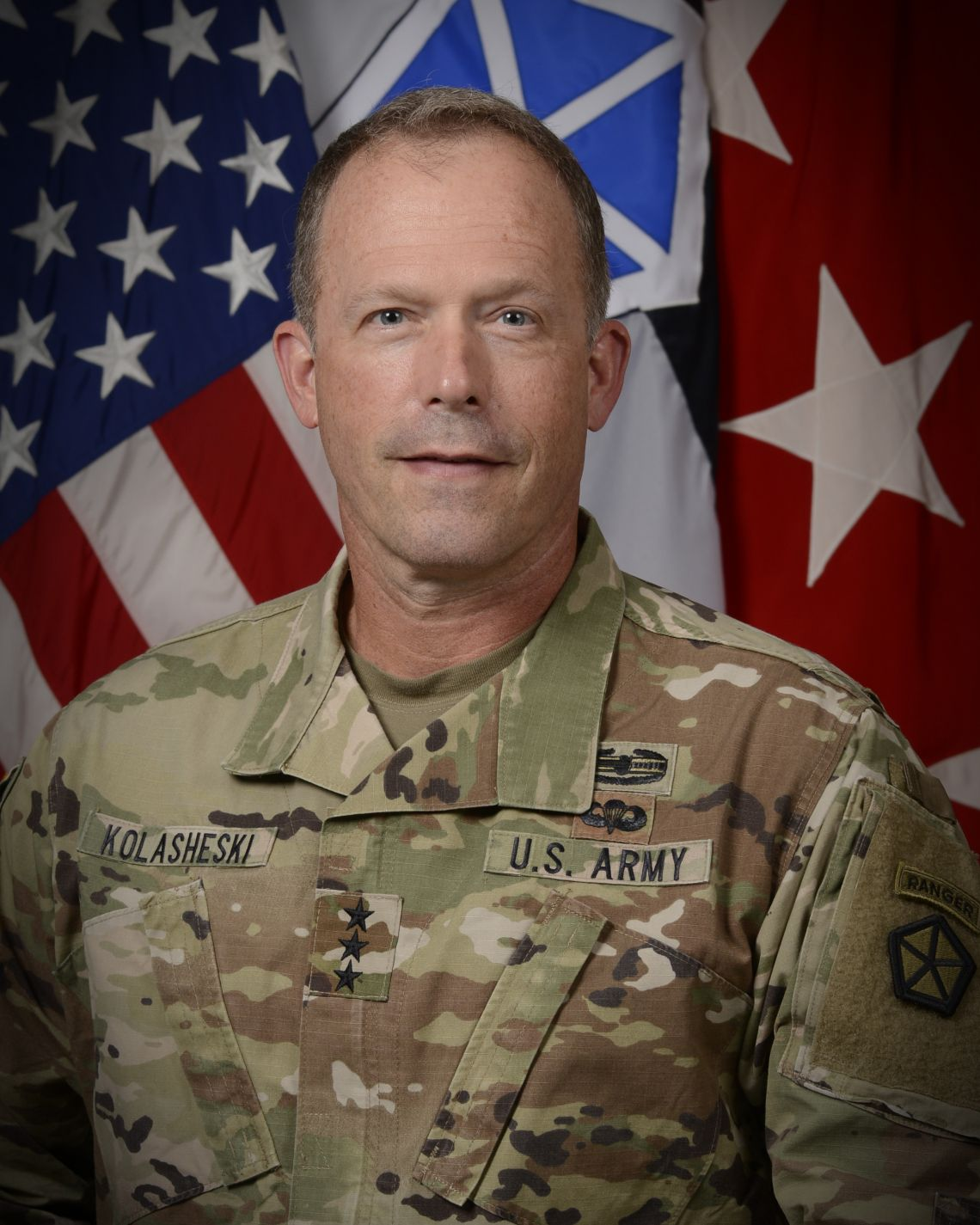
- Kolasheski in 2024
- Born: October 9, 1961 (age 65)
- Relatives: Divorced
- Military career
- Allegiance: United States
- Branch: United States Army
- Service years: 1989–2024
- Rank: Lieutenant General
- Commands: V Corps (United States Army Europe); 1st Infantry Division; United States Army Armor School; 2nd Brigade Combat Team, 4th Infantry Division
- Conflicts: Iraq War; War in Afghanistan
- Awards: Army Distinguished Service Medal (2); Defense Superior Service Medal; Legion of Merit (5); Bronze Star Medal (3)

John Stephen Kolasheski is a retired United States Army officer who was the commanding general of V Corps from 2020 to 2024.

== Education ==
Kolasheski is a 1989 graduate of Bucknell University in Lewisburg, Pennsylvania, where he earned a bachelor's degree in business administration. He has a master's degree in engineering management and interactive simulations from the University of Central Florida. He also has a degree in strategic studies from the United States Army War College.

== Military career ==
John S. Kolasheski was assigned to the 1st Infantry Division from 2001 to 2005. He was deployed in support of Operation Iraqi Freedom as well as Operation Enduring Freedom.

Kolasheski was the Deputy Commanding General (Maneuver) of the 1st Infantry Division from 2015 to 2016. He was also Commandant of the United States Army Armor School and Deputy Commanding General at the Maneuver Center of Excellence at Fort Benning.

Kolasheski has also previously served as Deputy Chief of Staff, G-3/5/7 for U.S. Army Forces Command at Fort Bragg.

Kolasheski assumed command of the 1st Infantry Division in 2018.

In May 2020, Kolasheski was nominated to command the newly reactivated V Corps. Kolasheski was confirmed to the rank of lieutenant general on May 21, 2020. He was promoted to lieutenant general on August 4, 2020 after relinquishing command of the 1st Infantry Division to his deputy Brigadier General Thomas W. O'Connor Jr.

In May 2023, Kolasheski was nominated for reappointment as a lieutenant general with assignment as the deputy commanding general of United States Army Europe and Africa. He retired on April 8, 2024.

Military offices
Preceded by Michael Kurilla	Deputy Commanding General (Maneuver) of the 1st Infantry Division; 2015–2016	Succeeded by Scott L. Efflandt
Preceded by Scott McKean	Commandant of the United States Army Armor School; 2016-2017	Succeeded by David A. Lesperance
Preceded by Leopoldo A. Quintas	Deputy Chief of Staff for Operations, Plans, and Training of the United States Army Forces Command; 2017–2018	Succeeded by Antonio A. Aguto Jr.
Preceded by John C. Thomson III	Commanding General of the 1st Infantry Division; 2018–2020	Succeeded by John W. O'Connor Jr. Acting
New office	Commanding General of V Corps	Succeeded by Charles Costanza
