= Steven W. Gilland =

U.S. Army general

Steven Gilland
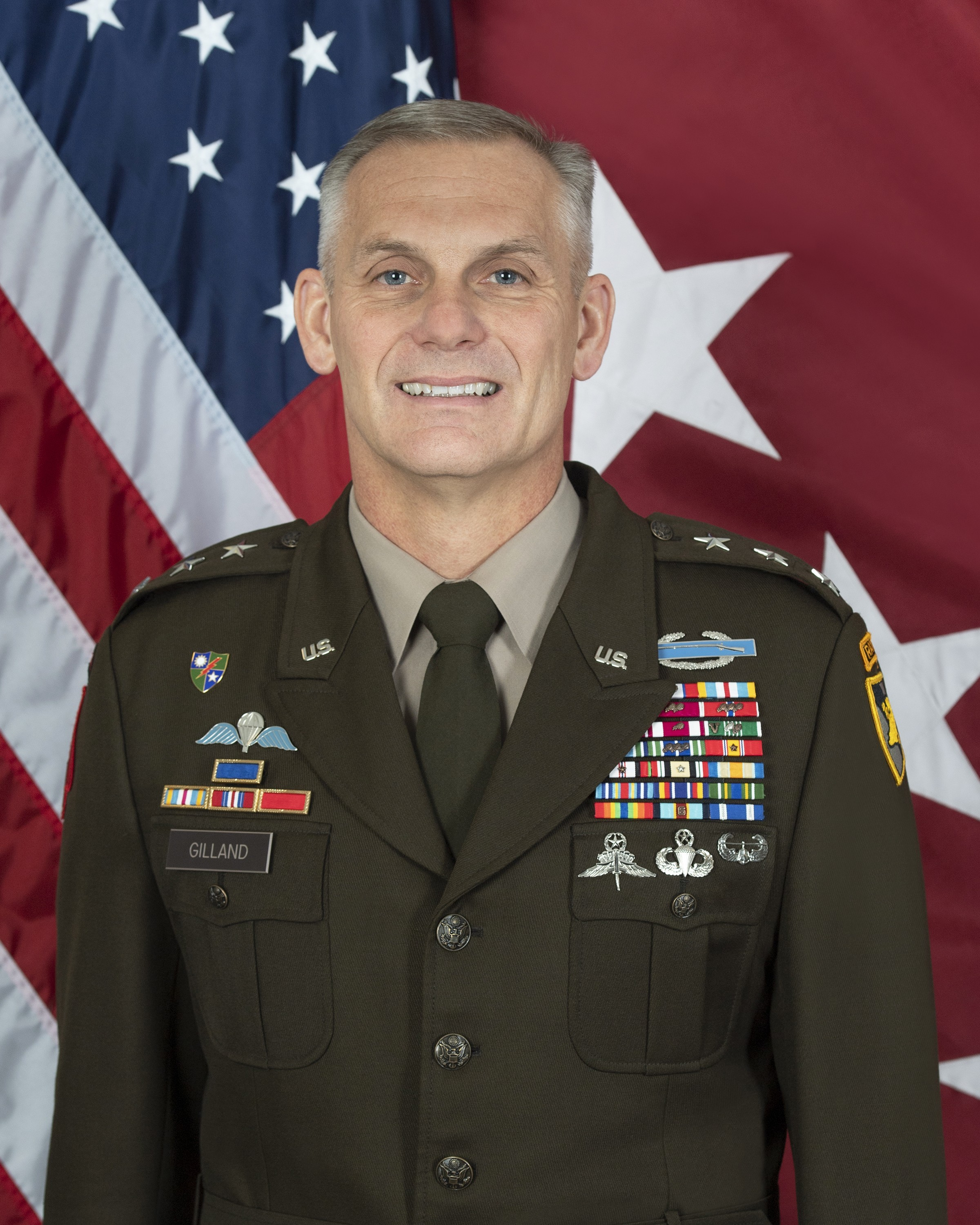

61st Superintendent of the United States Military Academy
- In office 27 June 2022 – 17 August 2026
- Preceded by: Darryl A. Williams
- Succeeded by: James B. Bartholomees III

Personal details
- Born: Steven Wesley Gilland
- Spouse: Betsy Gilland
- Children: 3
- Education: United States Military Academy (BS); Air University (MMAS)

Military service
- Allegiance: United States
- Branch/service: United States Army
- Years of service: 1990–2026
- Rank: Lieutenant General
- Commands: United States Military Academy; 2nd Infantry Division; 1st Brigade Combat Team, 1st Cavalry Division
- Battles/wars: War in Afghanistan; Iraq War; US intervention in the Syrian civil war; Operation Inherent Resolve
- Awards: Army Distinguished Service Medal; Defense Superior Service Medal; Legion of Merit (3); Bronze Star (4)

Steven Wesley Gilland is a retired United States Army lieutenant general who served as the 61st superintendent of the United States Military Academy from 27 June 2022 to 17 August 2026. He most recently served as the deputy commanding general for maneuver of III Corps from July 2021 to June 2022, and prior to that was commanding general of the 2nd Infantry Division from 2019 to 2021.

== Early life and education ==
A native of Rock Island, Illinois, Gilland graduated from Sherrard High School in 1986. He has a B.S. degree from the United States Military Academy and a M.S. degree in military operational art and science from the Air Command and Staff College of Air University. He married his West Point classmate Betsy with whom he has three children.

== Military career ==
Gilland was commissioned from United States Military Academy at West Point in 1990. After attending initial infantry officer training at Fort Benning, Gilland was assigned to Fort Stewart, located in Georgia, where he served in a mechanized infantry unit. Following that he served in A Company, 1st Ranger Battalion of the 75th Ranger Regiment. Gilland has also served in the United States Army's 1st Special Forces Operational Detachment Delta (Delta Force) where he was a Squadron Commander in the unit. In 2012, Gilland took command of the 1st "Ironhorse" Brigade Combat Team. Gilland was promoted to the rank of brigadier general in June 2015. He had previously participated in numerous deployments to the Middle East, Africa and Afghanistan. He served as the 77th Commandant of Cadets of the United States Military Academy from June 2017 to July 2019, and then became commanding general of the 2nd Infantry Division, serving from 17 July 2019 to 18 May 2021.

Around January 2021, the Office of the Chief of Staff of the Army announced that Gilland would become the deputy commander of III Corps at Fort Hood. He assumed the position on 22 July 2021, and served until 8 June 2022.

In May 2022, Gilland was nominated for promotion to lieutenant general and confirmed in June. He assumed office as the 61st Superintendent of the United States Military Academy on 27 June 2022, succeeding Darryl A. Williams.

== Awards and decorations ==
Gilland's awards and decorations include the Army Distinguished Service Medal, Defense Superior Service Medal, Legion of Merit, Bronze Star Medal, Defense Meritorious Service Medal, Meritorious Service Medal, Army Commendation Medal with V Device, Master Military Freefall Parachutist Badge, Master Parachutist Badge, Ranger tab, Air Assault Badge and the Combat Infantryman Badge.

Military offices
Preceded by Diana M. Holland	Commandant of Cadets of the United States Military Academy; 2017–2019	Succeeded by Curtis A. Buzzard
Preceded by Scott McKean	Commanding General of the 2nd Infantry Division; 2019–2021	Succeeded by David A. Lesperance
Preceded by Darryl A. Williams	Superintendent of the United States Military Academy; 2022–2026	Succeeded by James B. Bartholomees III
