= Leopoldo A. Quintas =

U.S Army General

Leopoldo A Quintas
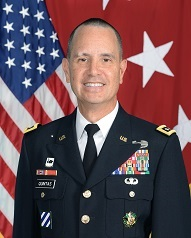
- Born: July 5, 1964 (age 62); Connecticut, United States
- Military career
- Allegiance: United States
- Branch: United States Army
- Service years: 1986–2021
- Rank: Lieutenant General
- Nickname: Lee
- Commands: 3rd Infantry Division; United States National Support Element Command–Afghanistan; United States Army Armor School; 16th Cavalry Regiment; 2nd Battalion, 70th Armor Regiment
- Conflicts: Gulf War; War in Afghanistan; Iraq War
- Awards: Defense Superior Service Medal; Legion of Merit (4); Bronze Star Medal (3); Meritorious Service Medal (6)

Leopoldo Aquino "Lee" Quintas Jr. (born July 5, 1964) is a retired lieutenant general in the United States Army, who last served as the deputy commanding general and chief of staff of United States Army Forces Command (FORSCOM).

Quintas was born in Connecticut and attended Montville High School, graduating in 1982. His father, Leopoldo "Leo" Quintas Sr. was born in the Philippines and was a United States Coast Guard veteran of the Vietnam War. Quintas Jr. is a graduate of United States Military Academy and was commissioned in 1986. He earned a master's degree in applied mathematics from the Rensselaer Polytechnic Institute and returned to the Military Academy to teach mathematical sciences from 1995 to 1997. Quintas Jr. was later commandant of the United States Army Armor School at Fort Benning from 2013 to 2014.

== Awards and decorations ==
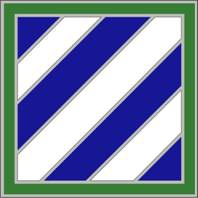
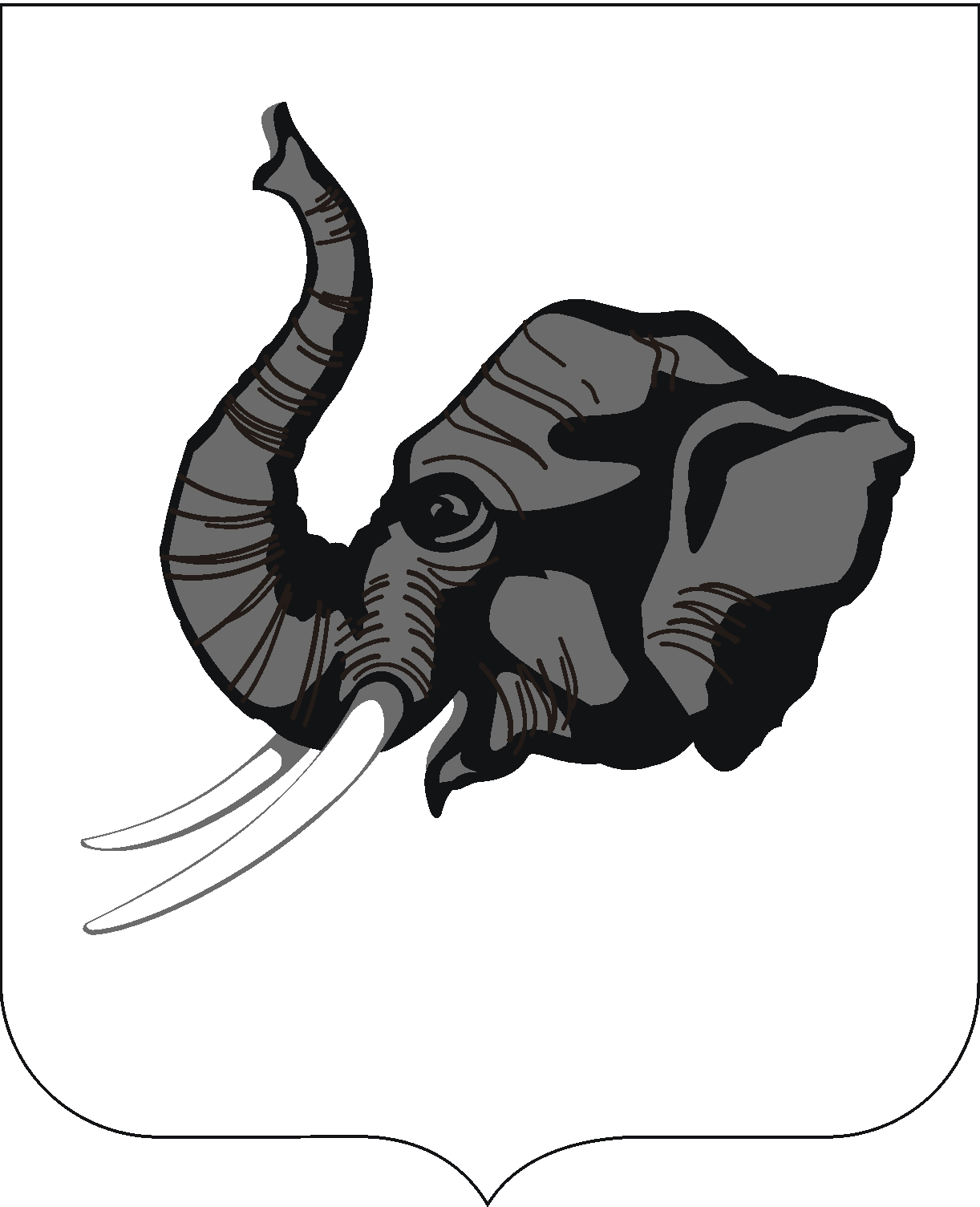
Combat Action Badge
Basic Parachutist Badge
Army Staff Identification Badge
3rd Infantry Division Combat Service Identification Badge
64th Armor Regiment Distinctive Unit Insignia
8 Overseas Service Bars

Defense Superior Service Medal
Legion of Merit with three bronze oak leaf clusters
Bronze Star Medal with "V" device and two oak leaf clusters
Meritorious Service Medal with silver oak leaf cluster
Army Commendation Medal with oak leaf cluster
Army Achievement Medal with oak leaf cluster
Valorous Unit Award with oak leaf cluster
Meritorious Unit Commendation
National Defense Service Medal with one bronze service star
Southwest Asia Service Medal with two service stars
Afghanistan Campaign Medal with two service stars
Iraq Campaign Medal with three service stars
Global War on Terrorism Expeditionary Medal
Global War on Terrorism Service Medal
Army Service Ribbon
Army Overseas Service Ribbon
NATO Medal for service with ISAF
Kuwait Liberation Medal (Saudi Arabia)
Kuwait Liberation Medal (Kuwait)

Military offices
Preceded by Robert P. White	Deputy Chief of Staff for Operations, Plans, and Training of the United States Army Forces Command; 2016–2017	Succeeded by John S. Kolasheski
Preceded by James Rainey	Commanding General of the 3rd Infantry Division; 2017–2019	Succeeded by Antonio Aguto
Preceded by Laura J. Richardson	Deputy Commanding General and Chief of Staff of the United States Army Forces Command; 2019–2021	Succeeded by Paul T. Calvert
