= Matthew J. Van Wagenen =

American army general

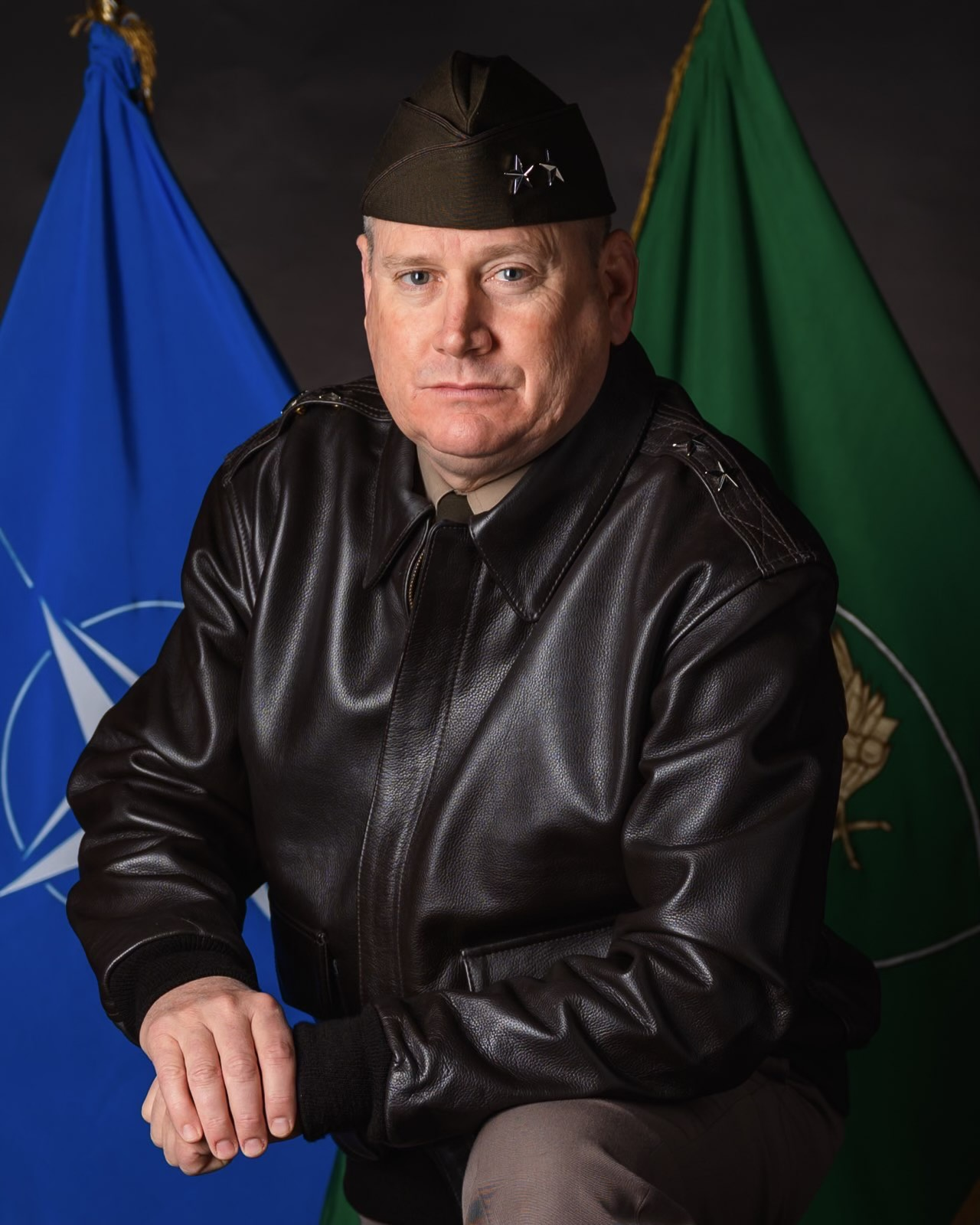
- Born: Pittsburgh, Pennsylvania, U.S.
- Military career
- Allegiance: United States
- Branch: United States Army
- Service years: 1991–present
- Rank: Major General
- Commands: Task Force Southeast; 3rd Brigade Combat Team, 1st Cavalry Division; 4th Squadron, 4th Cavalry Regiment; 1st Battalion, 34th Armor Regiment
- Conflicts: Iraq War: Battle of Ramadi; War in Afghanistan
- Awards: Defense Superior Service Medal; Legion of Merit (5); Bronze Star Medal (3); National Defence Medal Ordinul "Virtutea Militară" în grad de Cavaler- România
- Website: https://www.mattvw.com

Matthew J. Van Wagenen is a retired United States Army major general who recently served as deputy chief of staff for operations (DCOS-OPS) of Allied Command Operations in the Supreme Headquarters Allied Powers Europe. He was previously the deputy commanding general of V Corps at Victory Forward in Poznan, Poland and another prior assignment was as the chief of staff of operations of NATO, Allied Rapid Reaction Corps. He served as deputy commanding general of the 3rd (United Kingdom) Division and the 1st Cavalry Division, and as the commander of Task Force Southeast in Gardez City, Paktia Province, Afghanistan, from March to August 2017. He has participated in numerous combat operations, such as the Battle of Ramadi in 2006.

== Military career ==
Van Wagenen is an ROTC graduate of Marquette University, class of 1991. After attending the Armor Officer Basic Course, Van Wagenen was assigned to Erlangen, Germany, as Tank Platoon Leader and Battalion Motor Officer in the 2nd Brigade, 1st Armored Division in 1992. He was then assigned as a Troop Executive Officer in 3–4 Cavalry Regiment, 3rd Infantry Division in Schweinfurt, Germany, from November 1993 to September 1995. After completing the Armor Officer Advanced Course in Fort Knox, Kentucky, he was assigned as an Assistant Operations Officer, 2d Brigade, 3d Infantry Division in Georgia from April 1996 to May 1997. In 1997, Van Wagenen was assigned as Commander of A Company, 1st Battalion, 64th Armor Regiment, 2nd Brigade in Georgia. Afterwards, he was an Observer and Controller with Operations Group Combat Maneuver Training Center Hohenfels, Germany, in 1999. In 2004, he was assigned to SGS 7th Army Training Command Grafenwoehr, Germany. Then, he was assigned as an executive officer to the Bandits 1–37 Armor Regiment during the Battle of Ar Ramadi and Anbar Awakening till February 2007. He was quoted for explaining the unit's approach to urban warfare and the use of tanks in Ar Ramadi: "This is a whole different concept that leaves the city intact. We're doing this one block at a time, and it's slow," and "They asked me, 'What business does a tank battalion have in downtown Ramadi?" Van Wagenen said, "I told them: 'Any business we want.' And that's the truth."

In June 2008, Van Wagenen was the Commander of 1–34 Armor in Fort Riley, Kansas, at Camp Funston running training for Military Transition Teams (MiTT). Afterwards, he activated and commanded the 4th Squadron, 4th United States Cavalry of the 1st Brigade 1st Infantry Division till May 2010. From May 2010 to July 2013, Van Wagenen was the Division G-3, Chief of Operations for the 1st Infantry Division for 36 months, which included deployment to Regional Command East Afghanistan during the Surge.

From July 2013 to June 2014, Van Wagenen was a senior service college fellow at George C. Marshall European Center for Security Studies, in Garmisch-Partenkirchen, Germany. He was then assigned as commander of the 3d Armored Brigade Combat Team, 1st Cavalry Division, Fort Hood, Texas for two years. In June 2016, he became executive officer to the Director of the Army Staff, Office of the Chief of Staff of the Army. In April 2017, Van Wagenen was Deputy Commanding General (Support), 1st Cavalry Division, Fort Hood, Texas and Operation Freedom's Sentinel, Afghanistan.

From June 2018 to October 2019, Van Wagenen was Deputy Commanding General, 3rd (United Kingdom) Division in the United Kingdom. From October 2019 to May 2021 he was assigned as Deputy Chief of Staff for Operations, Allied Rapid Reaction Corps, North Atlantic Treaty Organization, United Kingdom.

In July 2021, Van Wagenen was promoted to major general.

In April 2022, Van Wagenen was assigned as the Deputy Chief of Staff for Strategic Employment (SEM), later Operations (OPS), of the Supreme Headquarters Allied Powers Europe.

== Selected works ==
- Van Wagenen, Matthew, David, Arnel P., and Jensen, Benjamin, "Innovate or Die: The Army Transformation Initiative and the Future of Allied Land Warfare," Center for Strategic and International Studies (CSIS) Futures Lab.
- Van Wagenen, Matthew, David, Arnel P., "NATO’s Northern Flank: Countering Russia & China Expansion in the Arctic," Real Clear Defense (October 10, 2024). https://www.realcleardefense.com/articles/2024/10/10/natos_northern_flank_countering_russia_and_china_expansion_in_the_arctic_1064137.html
- Van Wagenen, Matthew; David, Arnel P., "A Fiscal Crisis: The West is on the Wrong Side of the Cost Curve," Real Clear Defense (June 13, 2024) https://www.realcleardefense.com/articles/2024/06/13/a_fiscal_crisis_the_west_is_on_the_wrong_side_of_cost_curve_1037896.html?mc_cid=e6d491469e&mc_eid=f810e1cfad
- Van Wagenen, Matthew; David, Arnel P., "New NATO Strategy will Usher in a Renaissance in Allied Operations," Real Clear Defense (June 17, 2023), https://www.realcleardefense.com/articles/2023/06/17/new_nato_strategy_will_usher_in_a_renaissance_in_allied_operations_941318.html
- Van Wagenen, Matthew; David, Arnel P., "Lessons from Ukraine Many Don't Want to Hear," Real Clear Defense (March 11, 2023), https://www.realcleardefense.com/articles/2023/03/11/lessons_from_ukraine_many_dont_want_to_hear_886750.html
- Van Wagenen, Matthew; David, Arnel P., "Strategic Hub of Landpower Builds in the Black Sea Region," Real Clear Defense (October 2020), https://www.realcleardefense.com/articles/2021/02/05/strategic_hub_of_landpower_builds_in_the_black_sea_region_659209.html
- Van Wagenen, Matthew; David, Arnel P., "Project Convergence: An Arena of Innovative Collaboration," Real Clear Defense (October 2020), https://www.realcleardefense.com/articles/2020/10/01/project_convergence_an_arena_of_innovative_collaboration_579311.html

Featured in documentary, Facing War (2025), Van Wagenen accompanied NATO chief Jens Stoltenberg to Ukraine to meet with President Zelensky.

== Dates of rank ==
Promotions
Rank	Date
Second lieutenant	May 1991
First lieutenant	May 1993
Captain	July 1995
Major	October 2003
Lieutenant colonel	August 2007
Colonel	August 2013
Brigadier general	July 2018
Major general	July 2021

== Awards and decorations ==
Combat Action Badge

Airborne Badge

Parachutist Badge
Air Assault Badge
Defence Superior Service Medal
Legion of Merit with four bronze oak leaf clusters
Bronze Star Medal with "V" device and two oak leaf clusters (1 award for Valor)
Defense Meritorious Service Medal with one bronze oak leaf cluster
Meritorious Service Medal with three bronze oak leaf clusters
Army Commendation Medal with one bronze oak leaf cluster
Army Achievement Medal with one silver oak leaf cluster and one bronze oak leaf cluster
Army Meritorious Unit Commendation
Navy Unit Commendation
Army Superior Unit Award
National Defense Service Medal with one bronze service star
Afghanistan Campaign Medal with three bronze service stars
Iraqi Campaign Medal with one bronze service star
Global War on Terrorism Service Medal
Army Service Ribbon
NATO Medal

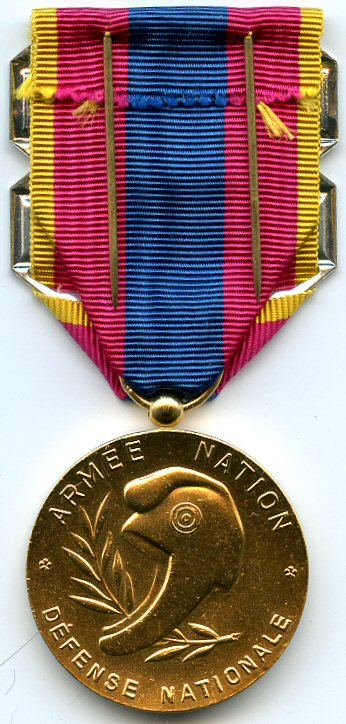
Médaille de la Défense nationale

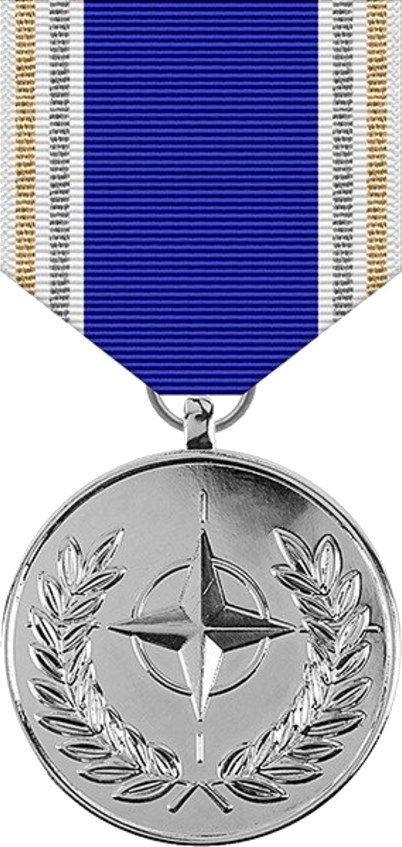

NATO Meritorious Service Medal

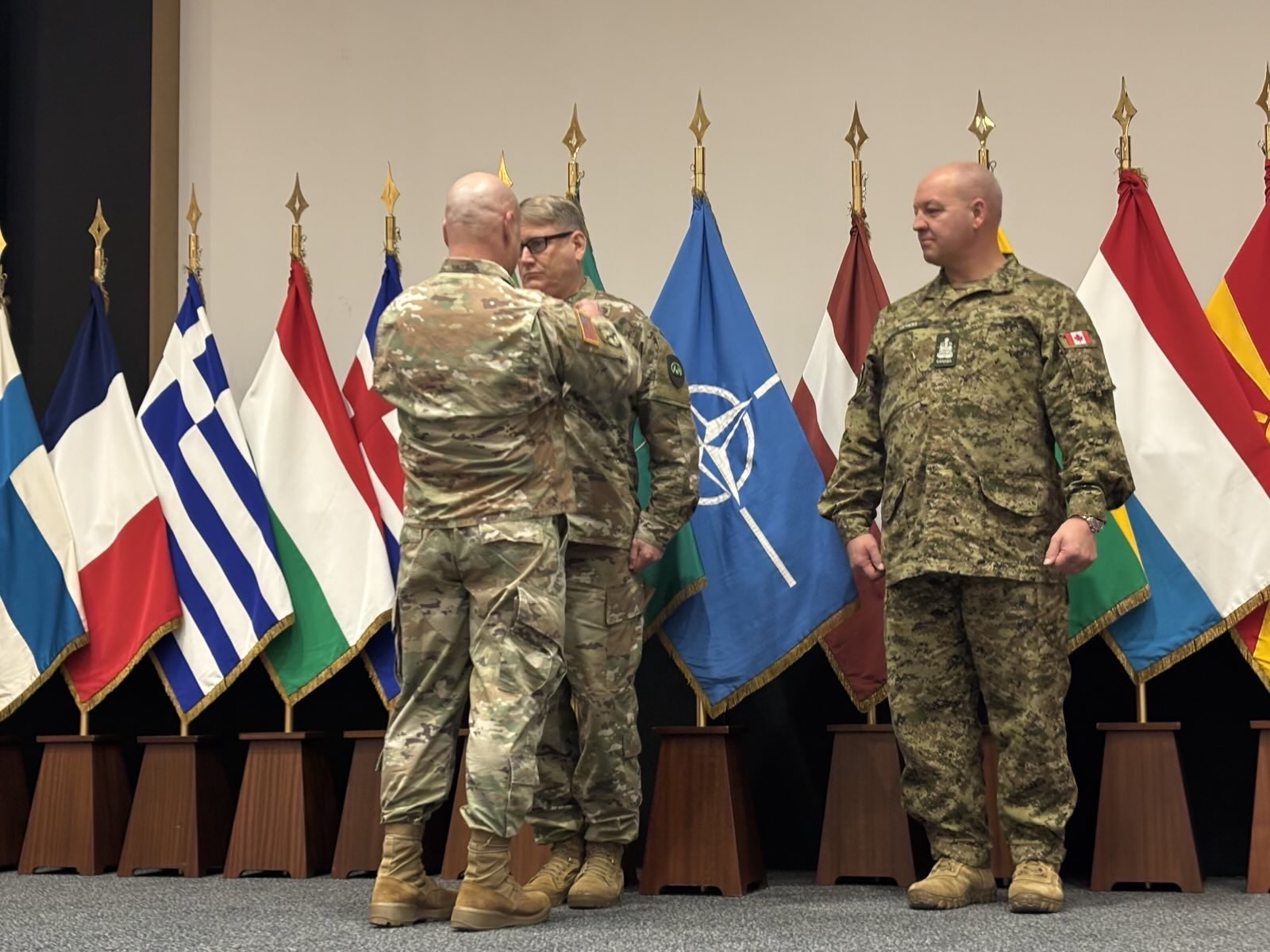

Multinational Corps Southeast Medal

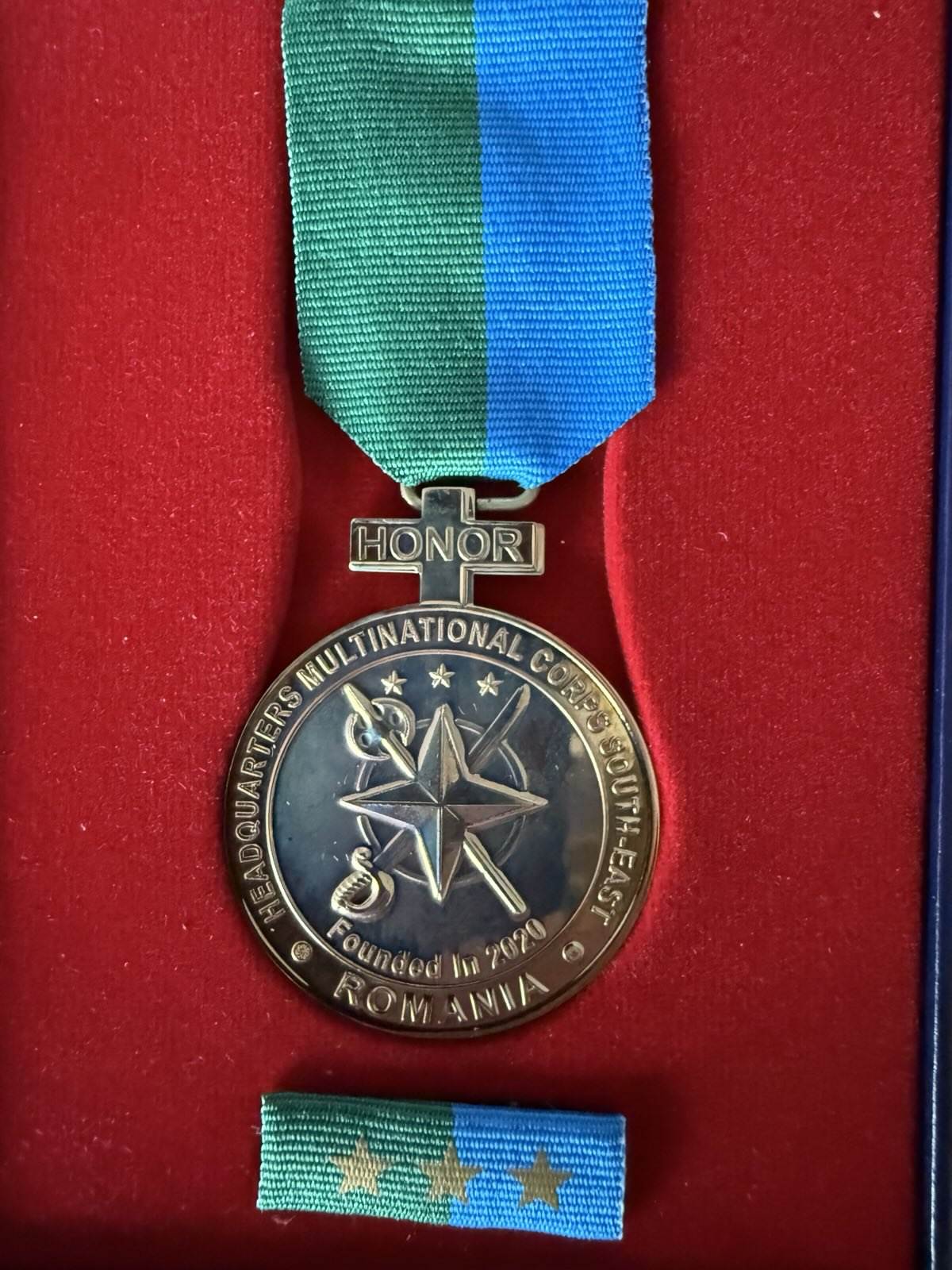
Multinational Corps Southeast

Military Virtue Medal

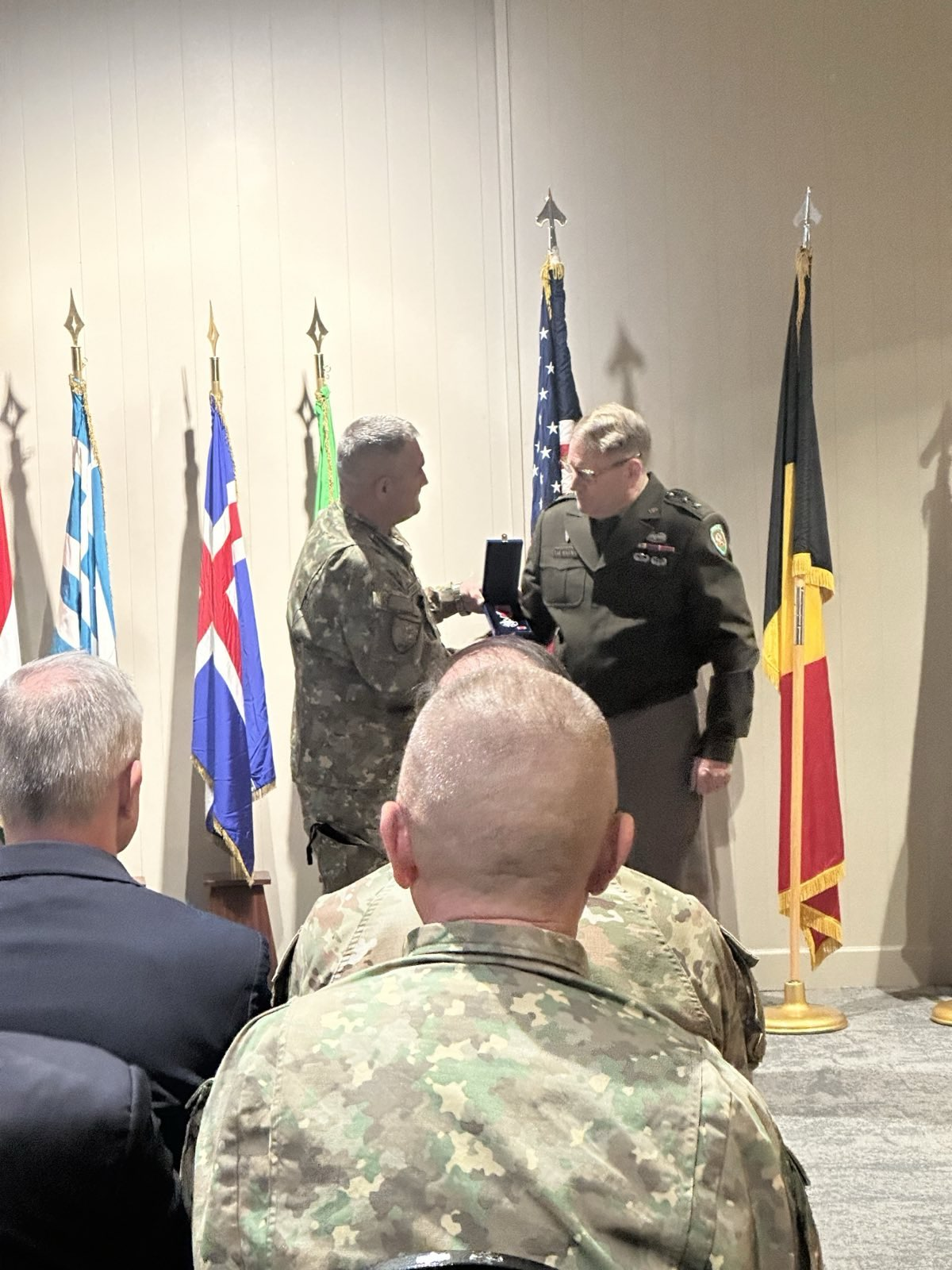
Military Virtue Medal awarded to Maj Gen Matthew Van Wagenen

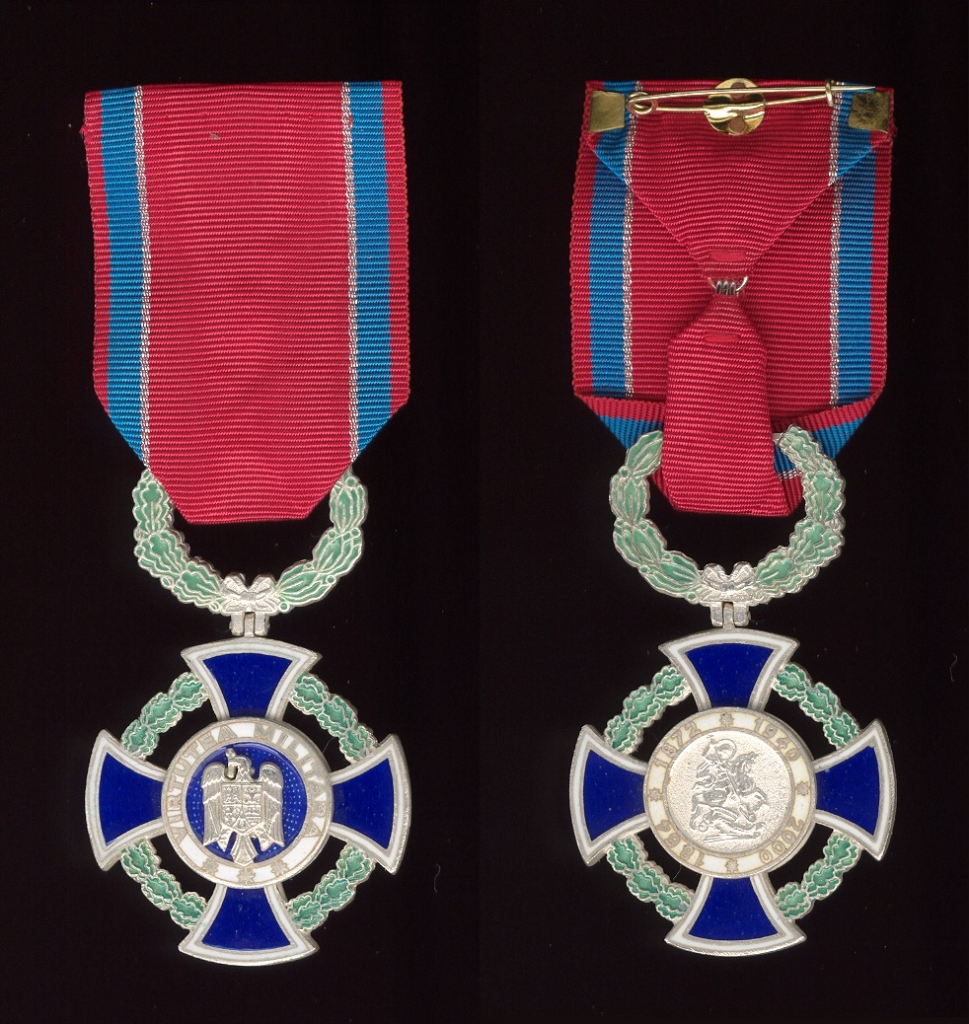

Order of Military Virtue, Knight rank

Military offices
Preceded by Douglas Sims II	Deputy Commanding General (Support) of the 1st Cavalry Division; 2017–2018	Succeeded by Edmond M. Brown
Preceded by Douglas C. Crissman	Deputy Commanding General of the 3rd (United Kingdom) Division; 2018–2019	Succeeded by Gene D. Meredith
Preceded by David M. Hamilton	Deputy Chief of Staff for Operations of the Allied Rapid Reaction Corps; 2019–2021	Succeeded by Winston P. Brooks
New office	Deputy Commanding General for Maneuver of the V Corps; 2021–2022	Succeeded by David B. Womack
Preceded by Phillip A. Stewart	Deputy Chief of Staff for Strategic Employment of Supreme Headquarters Allied Powers Europe; 2022–present	Incumbent
