= George I. Forsythe =

United States Army general

George Irvin Forsythe
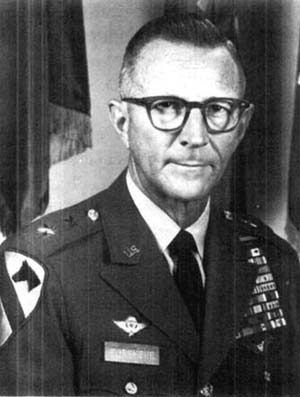
- Forsythe as a major general c. 1969
- Born: July 21, 1918; Butte, Montana
- Died: December 28, 1987 (aged 69); Beaufort, South Carolina
- Burial place: Beaufort National Cemetery
- Military career
- Allegiance: United States of America
- Branch: United States Army
- Service years: 1939–1972
- Rank: Lieutenant general
- Commands: 1st Cavalry Division
- Conflicts: World War II; Korean War; Vietnam War

George Irvin Forsythe (July 21, 1918 – December 28, 1987) was a United States Army Lieutenant General who served in World War II, the Korean War and the Vietnam War.

== Early life and education ==
Forsythe was born on July 21, 1918, in Butte, Montana.

== Military career ==
Forsythe joined the ROTC at the University of Montana, graduating in 1939.

In June 1962, Forsythe became executive officer and senior aide to the Chief of Staff of the United States Army, both General George H. Decker and General Earle G. Wheeler. He was promoted to brigadier general in August 1963. He served as assistant division commander of the 25th Infantry Division.

In 1967/8 Forsythe served as military deputy to Robert Komer the head of Civil Operations and Revolutionary Development Support.

Forsythe served as commander of the 1st Cavalry Division from August 1968 until April 1969.

In May 1969 Forsythe was appointed commandant of the United States Army Infantry School.

In October 1970 Army Chief of Staff General William Westmoreland selected Forsythe, then commanding the Army Combat Developments Command, to serve as the Special Assistant for the Modern Volunteer Army (SAMVA) and in this role which he held until 1972 he oversaw the transition of the US Army to an all-volunteer force. Project VOLAR was launched on January 1, 1971, to determine how to successfully transition the Army to an all volunteer organization.

Forsythe died on December 28, 1987, in Beaufort, South Carolina, and was buried at Beaufort National Cemetery.
