= John V. Meyer III =

U.S. Army officer

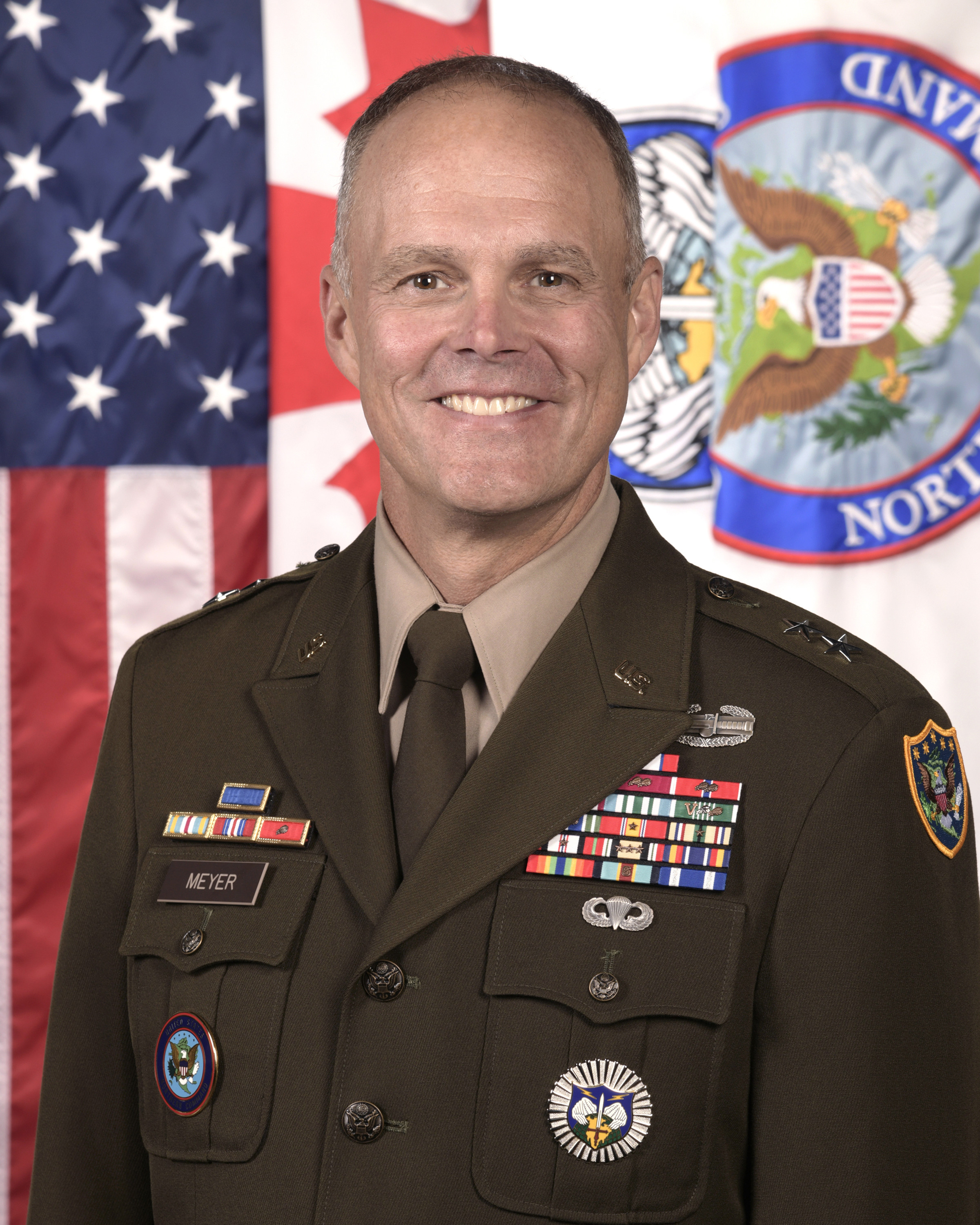
- Military career
- Allegiance: United States
- Branch: United States Army
- Service years: 1993–2025
- Rank: Major General

John V. Meyer III is a retired United States Army major general who served as the Chief of Staff, North American Aerospace Defense Command (NORAD) and United States Northern Command, Peterson Space Force Base.

== Early life and education ==
John V. Meyer III graduated from the Virginia Military Institute (VMI) in 1993, where he earned a degree in history. Upon graduation, he was commissioned into the Armor Branch of the United States Army. He furthered his military education by graduating from the U.S. Army's School of Advanced Military Studies and the U.S. Naval War College.

== Military career ==
Meyer has held various command positions throughout his military career. He commanded the 2d Battalion, 28th Infantry Regiment, and the 2d Cavalry Regiment. He also served as the Deputy Commanding General (Maneuver) of the 4th Infantry Division. Most recently, he served as Commanding General of the 1st Infantry Division and Fort Riley in Kansas.

Meyer has also held various staff assignments, including director of training for the G3 at U.S. Army Forces Command, executive assistant to the chairman of the Joint Chiefs of Staff, and G3 for U.S. Army Europe and Africa.
