= List of active duty United States Army major generals =

List of US Army major generals

U.S. Army major general insignia

U.S. Army rank insignia of a major general (Army Service Uniform)

The rank flag of a major general in the United States Army

This is a list of active duty United States Army major generals collected from publicly available and accessible information.

== Joint positions ==
=== Department of War ===
==== Defense Agencies ====
| Position insignia | Position | Part of | Photo | Incumbent | Service branch |
|---|---|---|---|---|---|
| Defense Health Agency | Military Deputy to the Director, Defense Health Agency (DHA) | Office of the Under Secretary of Defense for Personnel and Readiness (USD(P&R)) | | Major General; Timothy E. Brennan | U.S. Army |
| Defense Logistics Agency | Director, Joint Reserve Force (J-9), Defense Logistics Agency (DLA) | Office of the Assistant Secretary of Defense for Sustainment (ASD(Sustainment)) | | Major General; Stephanie Q. Howard | U.S. Army |

==== National intelligence agencies ====
| Position insignia | Position | Part of | Photo | Incumbent | Service branch |
|---|---|---|---|---|---|
| Central Security Service | Mobilization Assistant to the Deputy Chief, Central Security Service (CSS) | Office of the Under Secretary of Defense for Intelligence and Security (USD(I&S)); Army National Guard (ARNG) | | Major General; Stephen E. Schemenauer (Note: from the Army National Guard (ARNG)) | U.S. Army |

==== Joint Staff ====
| Position insignia | Position | Part of | Photo | Incumbent | Service branch |
|---|---|---|---|---|---|
| Joint Staff | Deputy Director for Logistics Operations (J-4), Joint Staff | (J-4) Logistics Directorate | | Major General; Nicole M. Balliet | U.S. Army |
| Joint Staff | Deputy Director for Strategic Initiatives (J-5), Joint Staff | (J-5) Strategy, Plans and Policy Directorate | | Major General; Brian T. Cashman | U.S. Army |
| Joint Staff Medical Corps | Joint Staff Surgeon and Chief, Medical Corps (MC) | Office of the Joint Staff; Army Medical Department (AMEDD) | | Major General; Clinton K. Murray | U.S. Army |

==== Unified combatant commands ====
| Position insignia | Position | Part of | Photo | Incumbent | Service branch |
|---|---|---|---|---|---|
Africa Command
| U.S. Africa Command | Deputy Director of Operations (J-3), U.S. Africa Command (USAFRICOM) | Not applicable | | Major General; Tina B. Boyd | U.S. Army |
| U.S. Africa Command | Director, Strategy, Engagement, and Programs (J-5), U.S. Africa Command (USAFRICOM) | Not applicable | | Major General; Garrick M. Harmon | U.S. Army |
| U.S. Africa Command | Special Assistant to the Commander, U.S. Africa Command (USAFRICOM) | Not applicable | | Major General; Jeffrey M. Farris | U.S. Army |
Central Command
| U.S. Central Command | Chief of Staff, U.S. Central Command (USCENTCOM) | Not applicable | | Major General; Richard A. Harrison | U.S. Army |
| Army National Guard | National Guard Assistant to the Commander, U.S. Cyber Command (USCYBERCOM) | Army National Guard (ARNG) | | Major General; Teri D. Williams | U.S. Army |
European Command
| U.S. European Command | Chief of Staff, U.S. European Command (USEUCOM) | Not applicable | | Major General; John L. Rafferty Jr. Promotable | U.S. Army |
| U.S. European Command | Director, Command, Control, Communications and Computers/Cyber Directorate and Chief Information Officer, U.S. European Command (USEUCOM) | Not applicable | | Major General; John H. Phillips | U.S. Army |
Northern Command
| U.S. Northern Command North American Aerospace Defense Command | Chief of Staff, U.S. Northern Command (USNORTHCOM) and North American Aerospace Defense Command (NORAD) | Not applicable | | Major General; John V. Meyer III | U.S. Army |
Southern Command
| U.S. Southern Command | Deputy Commander for Mobilization and Reserve Affairs, U.S. Southern Command (USSOUTHCOM) | Army National Guard (ARNG) | | Major General; Javier A. Reina | U.S. Army |
Space Command
| U.S. Space Command | Director for Plans and Policy (J-5), U.S. Space Command (USSPACECOM) | Not applicable | | Major General; Brian W. Gibson | U.S. Army |
Special Operations Command
| U.S. Special Operations Command | Chief of Staff, U.S. Special Operations Command (USSOCOM) | Not applicable | | Major General; Guillaume N. Beaurpere | U.S. Army |
| U.S. Special Operations Command | Director of Joint SOF Force Development and Design (J-7) (Provisional), U.S. Special Operations Command (USSOCOM) and Deputy Commander for Mobilization and Reserve Affairs, U.S. Special Operations Command | Army National Guard (ARNG) | | Major General; Shawn R. Satterfield | U.S. Army |
Strategic Command
| U.S. Strategic Command | Chief of Staff, U.S. Strategic Command (USSTRATCOM) | Not applicable | | Major General; John W. Weidner | U.S. Army |

=== National Guard ===
| Position insignia | Position | Part of | Photo | Incumbent | Service branch |
|---|---|---|---|---|---|
| National Guard Bureau | Director, Domestic Operations (J-3/4), National Guard Bureau (NGB) | Not applicable | | Major General; Ronald W. Burkett II | U.S. Army |
| National Guard Bureau | Director of Strategy, Policy, Plans, and International Affairs (J-5), National Guard Bureau (NGB) | Not applicable | | Major General; William J. Edwards | U.S. Army |
| National Guard Bureau | Director, Force Development (J-7), National Guard Bureau (NGB) | Not applicable | | Major General; Jerry F. Prochaska | U.S. Army |
| National Guard Bureau | Director, Office of the Joint Surgeon General, National Guard Bureau (NGB) | Not applicable | | Major General; Lisa J. Hou | U.S. Army |
| National Guard Bureau | Director, Office of Legislative Liaison, National Guard Bureau (NGB) | Not applicable | | Major General; Jennifer R. Mitchell | U.S. Army |
| National Guard Bureau Deputy Chief of Staff for Logistics (G-4) | National Guard Bureau Liaison, Office of the Deputy Chief of Staff for Logistics (G-4) | Not applicable | | Major General; Clint E. Walker | U.S. Army |
| National Guard Bureau | Principal Deputy General Counsel, National Guard Bureau (NGB) | Not applicable | | Major General; Timothy L. Rieger | U.S. Army |

=== Other joint positions ===
| Position insignia | Position | Part of | Photo | Incumbent | Service branch |
|---|---|---|---|---|---|
Sub-unified commands
| United Nations Command U.S. Forces Korea | South Korea; Chief of Staff, United Nations Command (UNC) and U.S. Forces Korea (USFK) | U.S. Indo-Pacific Command (USINDOPACOM) | | Major General; David B. Womack | U.S. Army |
| United Nations Command ROK/U.S. Combined Forces Command U.S. Forces Korea | South Korea; Director of Operations (U-3), United Nations Command (UNC), Director of Operations (C-3), ROK/U.S. Combined Forces Command (CFC) and Director of Operations (J-3), U.S. Forces Korea (USFK) | U.S. Indo-Pacific Command (USINDOPACOM) | | Major General; William A. Ryan III | U.S. Army |
| U.S. Forces Korea | South Korea; Director of Operations (J-3) (Wartime), U.S. Forces Korea (USFK) | U.S. Indo-Pacific Command (USINDOPACOM) | | Major General; Jeffrey W. Jurasek | U.S. Army |
| United Nations Command ROK/U.S. Combined Forces Command United States Forces Korea | South Korea; Director of Logistics (U-4), United Nations Command (UNC), Deputy Director of Logistics (C-4), ROK/U.S. Combined Forces Command (CFC) and Director of Logistics (J-4), U.S. Forces Korea (USFK) | U.S. Indo-Pacific Command (USINDOPACOM) | | Major General; Frederick L. Crist | U.S. Army |
| ROK/U.S. Combined Forces Command U.S. Forces Korea | South Korea; Deputy Combined Rear Area Coordinator, ROK/U.S. Combined Forces Command (CFC) and U.S. Forces Korea (USFK) | U.S. Indo-Pacific Command (USINDOPACOM) | | Major General; Justin W. Osberg | U.S. Army |
| Special Operations Command Central | Commander, Special Operations Command Central (SOCCENT) | U.S. Special Operations Command (USSOCOM); U.S. Central Command (USCENTCOM) | | Major General; Jasper Jeffers III | U.S. Army |
Special activities (domestic)
| Joint Task Force North | Commander, Joint Task Force North (JTF North) | U.S. Northern Command (USNORTHCOM) | | Major General; Henry S. Dixon | U.S. Army |
| | Director, Inter-American Defense College (IADC) | Inter-American Defense Board (IADB) | | Major General; Richard J. Heitkamp | U.S. Army |
Special activities (international)
| Combined Joint Task Force – Operation Inherent Resolve | Kuwait; Commander, Combined Joint Task Force – Operation Inherent Resolve (CJTF–OIR) | U.S. Central Command (USCENTCOM) | | Major General; Kevin J. Lambert | U.S. Army |
| | Germany; Deputy Commander, Security Assistance Group – Ukraine (SAG-U), Operation Atlantic Resolve (OAR) | U.S. European Command (USEUCOM) | | Major General; Duane R. Miller | U.S. Army |
| | Poland; Deputy Commanding General, 2nd Polish Corps | Not applicable | | Major General; Bryan M. Howay | U.S. Army |
| U.S. Embassy and Consulate in the United Arab Emirates | United Arab Emirates; Senior Defense Official and Defense Attaché, United Arab Emirates (UAE) | Defense Attaché System (DAS) | | Major General; Wendul G. Hagler II | U.S. Army |

== United States Army ==
=== Department of the Army ===
| Position insignia | Position | Part of | Photo | Incumbent | Service branch |
|---|---|---|---|---|---|
Office of the Secretary
| ASAALT | Portfolio Acquisition Executive for Agile Sustainment and Ammunition and Commanding General, Picatinny Arsenal | U.S. Army Transformation and Training Command (T2COM) Office of the Assistant Secretary of the Army (Acquisition, Logistics, and Technology) (OASA(ALT)) | | Major General; Christopher D. Schneider | U.S. Army |

=== Army Staff ===
| Position insignia | Position | Part of | Photo | Incumbent | Service branch |
|---|---|---|---|---|---|
| Director of the Army Staff | Special Assistant to the Director of the Army Staff (DAS) | Army Staff | | Major General; Constantin E. Nicolet | U.S. Army |
| Directorate of Strategic Operations (DAMO-SO), Army Staff | Director of Strategic Operations, Office of the Deputy Chief of Staff for Operations, Plans and Training (G-3/5/7) | Army Staff | | Major General; Jake S. Kwon | U.S. Army |
| Office of the Deputy Chief of Staff for Operations, Plans and Training (G-3/5/7) | Director, Joint Counter-Unmanned Aircraft Systems Office (JCO) and Director of Fires, Office of the Deputy Chief of Staff for Operations, Plans and Training (G-3/5/7) | Army Staff | | Major General; David F. Stewart | U.S. Army |
| Office of the Deputy Chief of Staff for Operations, Plans and Training (G-3/5/7) | Director, Strategy, Plans and Policy, Office of the Deputy Chief of Staff for Operations, Plans and Training (G-3/5/7) | Army Staff | | Major General; Stephanie R. Ahern | U.S. Army |
| Office of the Deputy Chief of Staff for Logistics (G-4) | Assistant Deputy Chief of Staff for Logistics and Mobilization (G-4) | Army Staff | | Major General; John M. Dreska | U.S. Army |
| Deputy Chief of Staff for Programs (G-8) | Director, Force Development, Office of the Deputy Chief of Staff for Programs (G-8) | Army Staff | | Major General; Thomas W. O'Connor Jr. | U.S. Army |

=== Army commands ===
| Position insignia | Position | Part of | Photo | Incumbent | Service branch |
|---|---|---|---|---|---|
Subordinate to Army Materiel Command
| U.S. Army Materiel Command | Chief of Staff, U.S. Army Materiel Command (AMC) and Assistant Deputy Commanding General, U.S. Army Reserve, U.S. Army Materiel Command | Not applicable | | Major General; Kevin F. Meisler | U.S. Army |
| U.S. Army Aviation and Missile Command | Commanding General, U.S. Army Aviation and Missile Command (AMCOM) | U.S. Army Materiel Command (AMC) | | Major General; Lori L. Robinson | U.S. Army |
| U.S. Army Communications-Electronics Command | Commanding General, U.S. Army Communications-Electronics Command (CECOM) and Senior Commander, Aberdeen Proving Ground (APG) | U.S. Army Materiel Command (AMC) | | Major General; James D. Turinetti IV | U.S. Army |
| U.S. Army Contracting Command | Commanding General, U.S. Army Contracting Command (ACC) | U.S. Army Materiel Command (AMC) | | Major General; Douglas S. Lowrey | U.S. Army |
| U.S. Army Sustainment Command | Commanding General, U.S. Army Sustainment Command (ASC) | U.S. Army Materiel Command (AMC) | | Major General; Eric P. Shirley | U.S. Army |
Subordinate to United States Army Transformation and Training Command
| | Deputy Commanding General, Army National Guard, Transformation and Training Command (T2COM) | Army National Guard (ARNG) | | Major General; Stephanie A. Purgerson | U.S. Army |
| | Chief of Staff, Transformation and Training Command (T2COM) | Not applicable | | Major General; John M. Cushing | U.S. Army |
| U.S. Army Medical Research and Development Command Defense Health Agency | Commanding General, U.S. Army Medical Research and Development Command (USAMRDC), Deputy Assistant Director, Research and Engineering, Defense Health Agency (DHA) and Commanding General, Fort Detrick | U.S. Army Transformation and Training Command (T2COM) | | Major General; Paula C. Lodi | U.S. Army |
| U.S. Army Combined Arms Command | Deputy Commanding General – Army National Guard, U.S. Army Combined Arms Command (USACAC) | U.S. Army Transformation and Training Command (T2COM) | | Major General; Charles G. Kemper IV | U.S. Army |
| U.S. Army Combined Arms Command | Deputy Commanding General, U.S. Army Reserve, U.S. Army Combined Arms Command (USACAC) | U.S. Army Transformation and Training Command (T2COM) | | Major General; Karen S. Monday-Gresham | U.S. Army |
| U.S. Army Aviation Center of Excellence Office of the Assistant Secretary of the Army (Acquisition, Logistics, and Technology) | Commanding General, U.S. Army Aviation Center of Excellence (AVCOE), Portfolio Acquisition Executive for Maneuver Air and Commanding General, Fort Rucker | U.S. Army Transformation and Training Command (T2COM) Office of the Assistant Secretary of the Army (Acquisition, Logistics, and Technology) (OASA(ALT)) | | Major General; Clair A. Gill | U.S. Army |
| U.S. Army Cyber Center of Excellence | Commanding General, U.S. Army Cyber Center of Excellence (CCoE) and Commanding General, Fort Gordon | U.S. Army Transformation and Training Command (T2COM); U.S. Army Cyber Command (ARCYBER) | | Major General; Ryan M. Janovic | U.S. Army |
| Minnesota National Guard U.S. Army Cyber Center of Excellence | Deputy Adjutant General, Minnesota and Deputy Commanding General, Army National Guard, U.S. Army Cyber Center of Excellence (CCoE) | U.S. Army Transformation and Training Command (T2COM); U.S. Army Cyber Command (ARCYBER); Army National Guard (ARNG) | | Major General; Stefanie K. Horvath | U.S. Army |
| U.S. Army Intelligence Center of Excellence | Commanding General, U.S. Army Intelligence Center of Excellence (USAICoE) and Commanding General, Fort Huachuca | U.S. Army Transformation and Training Command (T2COM) | | Major General; Richard T. Appelhans | U.S. Army |
| U.S. Army Maneuver Center of Excellence Office of the Assistant Secretary of the Army (Acquisition, Logistics, and Technology) | Commanding General, U.S. Army Maneuver Center of Excellence (MCoE), Portfolio Acquisition Executive for Maneuver Ground and Commanding General, Fort Benning | U.S. Army Transformation and Training Command (T2COM) Office of the Assistant Secretary of the Army (Acquisition, Logistics, and Technology) (OASA(ALT)) | | Major General; Colin P. Tuley | U.S. Army |
| U.S. Army Maneuver Support Center of Excellence Office of the Assistant Secretary of the Army (Acquisition, Logistics, and Technology) | Commanding General, U.S. Army Maneuver Support Center of Excellence (MSCoE), Portfolio Acquisition Executive for Layered Protection and CBRN Defense and Commanding General, Fort Leonard Wood | U.S. Army Transformation and Training Command (T2COM) Office of the Assistant Secretary of the Army (Acquisition, Logistics, and Technology) (OASA(ALT)) | | Major General; Christopher G. Beck | U.S. Army |
| U.S. Army Training Center U.S. Army Center for Initial Military Training | Commanding General, U.S. Army Training Center, Deputy Commanding General, U.S. Army Center for Initial Military Training (USACIMT) and Commanding General, Fort Jackson | U.S. Army Transformation and Training Command (T2COM) | | Major General; Daryl O. Hood | U.S. Army |
| U.S. Army Medical Center of Excellence | Commanding General, U.S. Army Medical Center of Excellence (MEDCoE) and The Senior Army Element Commander for Joint Base San Antonio (JBSA), Texas | U.S. Army Transformation and Training Command (T2COM); Army Medical Department (AMEDD) | | Major General; Anthony L. McQueen | U.S. Army |
| U.S. Army War College Army University | Commandant, U.S. Army War College (USAWC) and Vice Chancellor – Strategic Education, Army University (ArmyU) | U.S. Army Transformation and Training Command (T2COM) | | Major General; Trevor J. Bredenkamp | U.S. Army |

=== Army service component commands ===
| Position insignia | Position | Part of | Photo | Incumbent | Service branch |
|---|---|---|---|---|---|
| | Deputy Commanding General, Army National Guard, U.S. Army Western Hemisphere Command (USAWHC) | Army National Guard (ARNG) | | Major General; Richard F. Johnson | U.S. Army |
| | Chief of Staff, U.S. Army Western Hemisphere Command (USAWHC) | Not applicable | | Major General; Brian E. Miller | U.S. Army |
| | Deputy Chief of Staff (G-4), U.S. Army Western Hemisphere Command (USAWHC) | Not applicable | | Major General; Sean P. Davis | U.S. Army |
| U.S. Army Central | Deputy Commanding General, U.S. Army Central (ARCENT) | U.S. Central Command (USCENTCOM) | | Major General; Michael J. Leeney | U.S. Army |
| U.S. Army Network Enterprise Technology Command | Commanding General, U.S. Army Network Enterprise Technology Command (NETCOM) | U.S. Army Cyber Command (ARCYBER) | | Major General; Jacqueline D. McPhail | U.S. Army |
| U.S. Army Europe and Africa | Deputy Commanding General, U.S. Army Europe and Africa (USAREUR-AF) | U.S. Africa Command (USAFRICOM); U.S. European Command (USEUCOM) | | Major General; Christopher R. Norrie | U.S. Army |
| Southern European Task Force-Africa U.S. Army Europe and Africa | Commanding General, Southern European Task Force, Africa (SETAF-AF) and Deputy Commanding General for Africa, U.S. Army Europe and Africa (USAREUR-AF) | U.S. Africa Command (USAFRICOM); U.S. European Command (USEUCOM) | | Major General; Andrew C. Gainey | U.S. Army |
| U.S. Army Europe and Africa | Chief of Staff, U.S. Army Europe and Africa (USAREUR-AF) | U.S. Africa Command (USAFRICOM); U.S. European Command (USEUCOM) | | Major General; Ronald R. Ragin | U.S. Army |
| U.S. Army Europe and Africa | Deputy Commanding General for Army National Guard, U.S. Army Europe and Africa (USAREUR-AF) | U.S. Africa Command (USAFRICOM); U.S. European Command (USEUCOM); Army National Guard (ARNG) | | Major General; Levon E. Cumpton | U.S. Army |
| 8th Theater Sustainment Command | Commanding General, 8th Theater Sustainment Command | U.S. Indo-Pacific Command (USINDOPACOM) | | Major General; Gavin J. Gardner | U.S. Army |
| U.S. Army Pacific | Deputy Commanding General, Army National Guard, U.S. Army Pacific (USARPAC) | U.S. Indo-Pacific Command (USINDOPACOM); Army National Guard (ARNG) | | Major General; Lance A. Okamura | U.S. Army |
| U.S. Army Japan | Commanding General, U.S. Army Japan (USARJ) and Commanding General, I Corps (Forward) | U.S. Forces Japan (USFJ); U.S. Army Pacific (USARPAC); I Corps | | Major General; James K. Dooghan | U.S. Army |
| U.S. Army North | Deputy Commanding General – Support, U.S. Army North (ARNORTH), Deputy Commanding General – National Guard, U.S. Army North and Commanding General, Task Force 51, U.S. Army North | U.S. Army Western Hemisphere Command (USAWHC) | | Major General; Scott M. Sherman | U.S. Army |
| U.S. Army North | Deputy Commanding General – Operations, U.S. Army North (ARNORTH) | U.S. Army Western Hemisphere Command (USAWHC) | | Major General; Niave F. Knell | U.S. Army |
| U.S. Army South | Commanding General, U.S. Army South (ARSOUTH) and Commanding General, Fort Sam Houston | U.S. Army Western Hemisphere Command (USAWHC) | | Major General; Philip J. Ryan | U.S. Army |
| U.S. Army John F. Kennedy Special Warfare Center and School | Commanding General, U.S. Army John F. Kennedy Special Warfare Center and School (SWCS) | U.S. Army Special Operations Command (USASOC) | | Major General; Jason C. Slider | U.S. Army |
| U.S. Army Transportation Command | Commanding General, U.S. Army Transportation Command (ARTRANS) and Commander, Permanent Change of Station Joint Task Force (PCS JTF) | Office of the Under Secretary of Defense (Acquisition and Sustainment) (USD(A&S)); U.S. Transportation Command (USTRANSCOM); U.S. Army Materiel Command (AMC) | | Major General; Lance G. Curtis | U.S. Army |

=== Direct reporting units ===
| Position insignia | Position | Part of | Photo | Incumbent | Service branch |
|---|---|---|---|---|---|
| Office of the Chief of Chaplains Chief of Chaplains of the United States Army | Chief of Chaplains of the United States Army (CCH) | U.S. Army Chaplain Corps | | Vacant | U.S. Army |
| U.S. Army Corps of Engineers | Deputy Commanding General for Military and International Operations, U.S. Army Corps of Engineers (USACE) | Not applicable | | Major General; Mark C. Quander | U.S. Army |
| U.S. Army Corps of Engineers | Deputy Commanding General for Civil Works and Emergency Operations, U.S. Army Corps of Engineers (USACE) | Not applicable | | Major General; Jason E. Kelly | U.S. Army |
| U.S. Army Corps of Engineers | Deputy Commanding General for Reserve Affairs, U.S. Army Corps of Engineers (USACE) | Not applicable | | Major General; Kent J. Lightner | U.S. Army |
| Mississippi Valley Division | Commanding General, Mississippi Valley Division (MVD) | U.S. Army Corps of Engineers (USACE) | | Major General; Kimberly A. Peeples | U.S. Army |
| U.S. Army Human Resources Command | Commanding General, U.S. Army Human Resources Command (HRC) | Not applicable | | Major General; Hope C. Rampy | U.S. Army |
| U.S. Army Intelligence and Security Command | Commanding General, U.S. Army Intelligence and Security Command (INSCOM) | Military Intelligence Corps | | Major General; Rhett R. Cox | U.S. Army |
| Judge Advocate General's Corps, U.S. Army | Judge Advocate General of the United States Army (TJAG) | Judge Advocate General's Corps, U.S. Army | | Major General; Bobby L. Christine | U.S. Army |
| Judge Advocate General's Corps, U.S. Army | Deputy Judge Advocate General of the United States Army (DJAG) | Judge Advocate General's Corps, U.S. Army | | Major General; Robert A. Borcherding | U.S. Army |
| U.S. Army Medical Command | Deputy Commanding General (Support) and Chief of Staff, U.S. Army Medical Command (MEDCOM) | Not applicable | | Major General; Jill K. Faris | U.S. Army |
| U.S. Army Medical Command Defense Health Agency | Deputy Surgeon General for Mobilization, Readiness and Army Reserve Affairs and Director, Defense Health Agency Region Indo-Pacific (DHAR-IP) | Not applicable | | Major General; W. Scott Lynn | U.S. Army |
| U.S. Army Test and Evaluation Command | Commanding General, U.S. Army Test and Evaluation Command (ATEC) | Not applicable | | Major General; Patrick L. Gaydon | U.S. Army |
| U.S. Army Military District of Washington Joint Task Force – National Capital Region | Commanding General, U.S. Army Military District of Washington (MDW) and Commander, Joint Task Force – National Capital Region (JTF-NCR) | Not applicable | | Major General; Antoinette R. Gant | U.S. Army |
Subordinate to United States Army Reserve Command
| U.S. Army Reserve | Deputy Chief of Army Reserve (DCAR) | U.S. Army Reserve Command (USARC) | | Major General; Dianne M. Del Rosso | U.S. Army |
| U.S. Army Reserve | Deputy Chief of Staff (G-3/5/7), Office of the Chief of Army Reserve (OCAR) | U.S. Army Reserve Command (USARC) | | Major General; Joseph M. Lestorti | U.S. Army |
| U.S. Army Reserve | General Officer Support, Office of the Chief of Army Reserve (OCAR) | U.S. Army Reserve Command (USARC) | | Major General; Robert S. Powell Jr. | U.S. Army |
| U.S. Army Reserve Command | Deputy Commanding General, U.S. Army Reserve Command (USARC) | U.S. Army Reserve Command (USARC) | | Major General; Martin F. Klein | U.S. Army |
| U.S. Army Civil Affairs and Psychological Operations Command | Commanding General, U.S. Army Civil Affairs and Psychological Operations Command (Airborne) (USACAPOC(A)) | U.S. Army Reserve Command (USARC) | | Major General; Andrée G. Carter | U.S. Army |

=== Army-level positions ===
| Position insignia | Position | Part of | Photo | Incumbent | Service branch |
|---|---|---|---|---|---|
| First Army | Deputy Commanding General (Operations), First Army | U.S. Army Western Hemisphere Command (USAWHC) | | Major General; Mark D. McCormack | U.S. Army |
| First Army | Deputy Commanding General (Support), First Army and Commander, U.S. Army Reserve Support Command, First Army | U.S. Army Western Hemisphere Command (USAWHC) | | Major General; Richard W. Corner II | U.S. Army |
| First Army | Commanding General, First Army Division East | First Army | | Major General; Michael J. Simmering | U.S. Army |
| First Army | Commanding General, First Army Division West | First Army | | Major General; William A. Ryan | U.S. Army |

=== Corps-level positions ===
| Position insignia | Position | Part of | Photo | Incumbent | Service branch |
|---|---|---|---|---|---|
| XVIII Airborne Corps | Deputy Commanding General, XVIII Airborne Corps | U.S. Army Western Hemisphere Command (USAWHC) | | Major General; J. Patrick Work | U.S. Army |

=== Division-level positions ===
==== Regular divisions ====
| Position insignia | Position | Part of | Photo | Incumbent | Service branch |
|---|---|---|---|---|---|
Infantry divisions
| 1st Infantry Division | Commanding General, 1st Infantry Division and Commanding General, Fort Riley | III Armored Corps | | Major General; Monte L. Rone | U.S. Army |
| 2nd Infantry Division (Combined) | Commanding General, 2nd Infantry Division-ROK/U.S. Combined Division (2ID/RUCD) | Eighth United States Army; ROK/U.S. Combined Forces Command (CFC) | | Major General; Charles T. Lombardo | U.S. Army |
| | Commanding General, 3rd Infantry Division and Commanding General, Fort Stewart | XVIII Airborne Corps | | Major General; John W. Lubas | U.S. Army |
| 4th Infantry Division | Commanding General, 4th Infantry Division and Commanding General, Fort Carson | I Corps | | Major General; Patrick J. Ellis | U.S. Army |
| 7th Infantry Division | Commanding General, 7th Infantry Division | I Corps | | Major General; Bernard J. Harrington | U.S. Army |
| 25th Infantry Division | Commanding General, 25th Infantry Division and Senior Commander, U.S. Army Hawaii (USARHAW) | I Corps | | Major General Jeffrey A. VanAntwerp | U.S. Army |
| 28th Infantry Division | Commanding General, 28th Infantry Division | Army National Guard (ARNG); Pennsylvania Army National Guard (PA ARNG) | | Major General; Michael E. Wegscheider | U.S. Army |
| 29th Infantry Division | Commanding General, 29th Infantry Division | Army National Guard (ARNG); Virginia Army National Guard (VA ARNG) | | Major General; Joseph Dinonno | U.S. Army |
| 35th Infantry Division | Commanding General, 35th Infantry Division | Army National Guard (ARNG); Kansas Army National Guard (KS ARNG) | | Major General; Martin M. Clay Jr. | U.S. Army |
| 36th Infantry Division | Commanding General, 36th Infantry Division | Army National Guard (ARNG); Texas Army National Guard (TX ARNG) | | Major General; John B. Bowlin | U.S. Army |
| 38th Infantry Division Task Force Spartan | Commanding General, 38th Infantry Division and Commander, Task Force Spartan | U.S. Army Central (ARCENT); Army National Guard (ARNG); Indiana Army National Guard (IN ARNG) | | Major General; Daniel A. Degelow | U.S. Army |
| 40th Infantry Division | Commanding General, 40th Infantry Division | Army National Guard (ARNG); California Army National Guard (CA ARNG) | | Major General; William J. Prendergast IV | U.S. Army |
| 42nd Infantry Division | Commanding General, 42nd Infantry Division | Army National Guard (ARNG); New York Army National Guard (NY ARNG) | | Major General; Jack A. James Jr. | U.S. Army |
Cavalry divisions
| 1st Cavalry Division | Commanding General, 1st Cavalry Division | III Armored Corps | | Major General; Thomas M. Feltey | U.S. Army |
Armored divisions
| 1st Armored Division | Commanding General, 1st Armored Division, Commander, Task Force Iron and Commanding General, Fort Bliss | III Armored Corps | | Major General; Curtis D. Taylor | U.S. Army |
Mountain divisions
| 10th Mountain Division (Light) | Commanding General, 10th Mountain Division (Light Infantry), and Commanding General, Fort Drum | XVIII Airborne Corps | | Major General; Scott M. Naumann | U.S. Army |
Airborne divisions
| 11th Airborne Division Alaskan Command | Commanding General, 11th Airborne Division and Deputy Commander, Alaskan Command (ALCOM) | Alaskan Command (ALCOM); I Corps | | Major General; John P. Cogbill | U.S. Army |
| 82nd Airborne Division | Commanding General, 82nd Airborne Division and Commander, Task Force 82 | XVIII Airborne Corps | | Major General; Brandon R. Tegtmeier | U.S. Army |
| 101st Airborne Division | Commanding General, 101st Airborne Division (Air Assault) and Commanding General, Fort Campbell | XVIII Airborne Corps | | Major General; David W. Gardner | U.S. Army |

==== Division-sized units ====
| Position insignia | Position | Part of | Photo | Incumbent | Service branch |
|---|---|---|---|---|---|
Engineer commands
| 412th Theater Engineer Command | Commanding General, 412th Theater Engineer Command | U.S. Army Reserve (USAR); U.S. Army Reserve Command (USARC) | | Major General; Matthew S. Warne | U.S. Army |
| 416th Theater Engineer Command | Commanding General, 416th Theater Engineer Command | U.S. Army Reserve (USAR); U.S. Army Reserve Command (USARC) | | Major General; James J. Kokaska Jr. | U.S. Army |
Medical commands
| 3rd Medical Command (Deployment Support) | Commanding General, 3rd Medical Command (Deployment Support) | U.S. Army Reserve (USAR); U.S. Army Reserve Command (USARC) | | Major General; Jennifer A. Marrast Host | U.S. Army |
| 18th Medical Command (Deployment Support) U.S. Army Pacific | Commanding General, 18th Medical Command (Deployment Support) and Command Surgeon, U.S. Army Pacific (USARPAC) | U.S. Army Pacific (USARPAC) | | Major General (Dr.); E. Darrin Cox | U.S. Army |
| 807th Medical Command (Deployment Support) | Commanding General, 807th Medical Command (Deployment Support) | U.S. Army Reserve (USAR); U.S. Army Reserve Command (USARC) | | Major General; Beth A. Salisbury | U.S. Army |
Military police commands
| 46th Military Police Command | Commanding General, 46th Military Police Command | Army National Guard (ARNG); Michigan Army National Guard (MI ARNG) | | Major General; Scott W. Hiipakka | U.S. Army |
| 200th Military Police Command | Commanding General, 200th Military Police Command | U.S. Army Reserve (USAR); U.S. Army Reserve Command (USARC) | | Major General; Susie S. Kuilan | U.S. Army |
Missile defense commands
| 263rd Army Air and Missile Defense Command | Commanding General, 263rd Army Air and Missile Defense Command | Army National Guard (ARNG); South Carolina Army National Guard (SC ARNG) | | Major General; Richard A. Wholey Jr. | U.S. Army |
Readiness divisions
| 63rd Readiness Division | Commanding General, 63rd Readiness Division | U.S. Army Reserve (USAR); U.S. Army Reserve Command (USARC) | | Major General; Windsor S. Buzza | U.S. Army |
| 81st Readiness Division | Commanding General, 81st Readiness Division | U.S. Army Reserve (USAR); U.S. Army Reserve Command (USARC) | | Major General; Patricia R. Wallace | U.S. Army |
| 88th Readiness Division | Commanding General, 88th Readiness Division and Senior Commander, Fort McCoy | U.S. Army Reserve (USAR); U.S. Army Reserve Command (USARC) | | Major General; Joseph A. Ricciardi | U.S. Army |
| 99th Readiness Division | Commanding General, 99th Readiness Division | U.S. Army Reserve (USAR); U.S. Army Reserve Command (USARC) | | Major General; Laurence S. Linton | U.S. Army |
Signal commands
| 335th Signal Command (Theater) | Commanding General, 335th Signal Command (Theater) | U.S. Army Central (ARCENT); U.S. Army Reserve Command (USARC) | | Major General; Jan C. Norris | U.S. Army |
Sustainment commands
| 1st Theater Sustainment Command | Commanding General, 1st Theater Sustainment Command | U.S. Army Central (ARCENT) | | Major General; John B. Hinson | U.S. Army |
| 8th Theater Sustainment Command | Commanding General, 8th Theater Sustainment Command | U.S. Army Pacific (USAPAC) | | Major General; Gavin J. Gardner | U.S. Army |
| 21st Theater Sustainment Command | Commanding General, 21st Theater Sustainment Command | U.S. Army Europe and Africa (USAREUR-AF) | | Major General; Michael B. Lalor | U.S. Army |
| 79th Theater Sustainment Command | Commanding General, 79th Theater Sustainment Command | U.S. Army Reserve (USAR) | | Major General; Todd L. Erskine | U.S. Army |
| 167th Theater Sustainment Command | Commanding General, 167th Theater Sustainment Command | Army National Guard (ARNG); Alabama Army National Guard (AL ARNG) | | Major General; Thomas M. Vickers Jr. | U.S. Army |
| 377th Theater Sustainment Command | Commanding General, 377th Theater Sustainment Command | U.S. Army Reserve (USAR) | | Major General; Justin M. Swanson | U.S. Army |
Training divisions
| 75th Innovation Command | Commanding General, 75th Innovation Command | U.S. Army Futures and Concepts Command (FCC); U.S. Army Reserve (USAR); U.S. Army Reserve Command (USARC) | | Major General; Michelle A. Link | U.S. Army |
| 76th Operational Response Command | Commanding General, 76th Operational Response Command | U.S. Army Reserve (USAR); U.S. Army Reserve Command (USARC) | | Major General; Dean P. Thompson | U.S. Army |
| 80th Training Command | Commanding General, 80th Training Command (The Army School System – TASS) | U.S. Army Recruiting Command (USAREC); U.S. Army Reserve (USAR); U.S. Army Reserve Command (USARC) | | Major General; Michael J. Dougherty | U.S. Army |
| 84th Training Command | Commanding General, 84th Training Command | U.S. Army Reserve (USAR); U.S. Army Reserve Command (USARC) | | Major General; Kelly M. Dickerson | U.S. Army |
| 108th Training Command | Commanding General, 108th Training Command (Initial Entry Training) | U.S. Army Center for Initial Military Training (USACIMT); U.S. Army Reserve (USAR); U.S. Army Reserve Command (USARC) | | Major General; David M. Samuelsen | U.S. Army |

=== Army National Guard ===
| Position insignia | Position | Part of | Photo | Incumbent | Service branch |
|---|---|---|---|---|---|
| Army National Guard | Senior; Special Assistant to the Director, Army National Guard | National Guard; National Guard Bureau (NGB) | | Major General; Joseph R. Baldwin | U.S. Army |
| Army National Guard | Junior; Special Assistant to the Director, Army National Guard | National Guard; National Guard Bureau (NGB) | | Major General; John W. Rueger | U.S. Army |
In transit
| | | | | Major General; John M. Rhodes | U.S. Army |

== List of pending appointments ==
=== Retaining current position/position unannounced ===
These are general officers awaiting promotion to a higher rank while retaining their current position or do not have their future position announced yet.

| Photo | Name | Service branch | Status and date |
|---|---|---|---|
| | Brigadier General; Jason B. Nicholson | U.S. Army | Nomination sent to the Senate; 15 October 2025 |

== See also ==
- List of active duty United States four-star officers
- List of active duty United States three-star officers
- List of active duty United States Marine Corps major generals
- List of active duty United States rear admirals
- List of active duty United States Air Force major generals
- List of active duty United States Space Force general officers
- List of active duty United States senior enlisted leaders and advisors
- List of current United States National Guard major generals
- List of United States Army four-star generals
- List of United States Marine Corps four-star generals
- List of United States Navy four-star admirals
- List of United States Air Force four-star generals
- List of United States Space Force four-star generals
- List of United States Coast Guard four-star admirals
