= Allan Pepin =

U.S. Army general officer

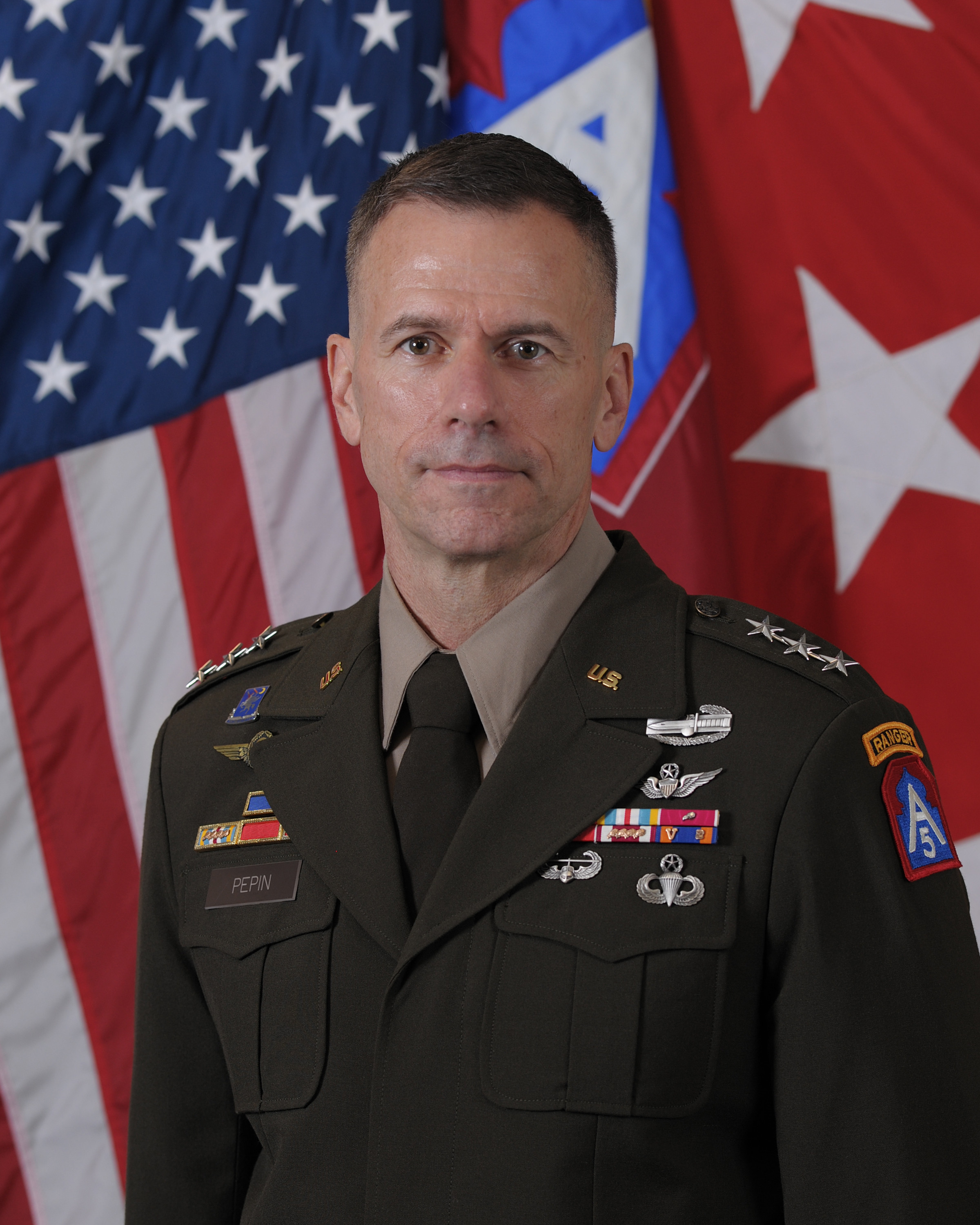
- Official portrait, 2024
- Born: c. 1966 (age 59–60); Tewksbury, Massachusetts, U.S.
- Education: Wentworth Institute of Technology (BS)
- Military career
- Allegiance: United States
- Branch: United States Army
- Service years: 1988–2026
- Rank: Lieutenant General
- Commands: United States Army North; United States Army Military District of Washington; Joint Force Headquarters National Capital Region; U.S. Army Special Operations Aviation Command; Combat Aviation Brigade, 3rd Infantry Division; Task Force 1, 160th Special Operations Aviation Regiment; 1st Battalion, 145th Aviation Regiment
- Conflicts: War in Afghanistan; 2001 invasion of Afghanistan; Iraq War; 2003 invasion of Iraq
- Awards: Army Distinguished Service Medal; Legion of Merit (2); Bronze Star Medal (4)

Allan Pepin (born c. 1966) is an American retired lieutenant general who last served as the commanding general of United States Army North from 2024 to 2026.

Pepin was born in Tewksbury, Massachusetts. He was commissioned as Aviation officer through the Army Reserve Officers' Training Corps in 1988, when he graduated from the Wentworth Institute of Technology. He had multiple deployments to Iraq and Afghanistan during his career, including for the 2001 invasion of Afghanistan and the 2003 invasion of Iraq. Pepin's commands included the 3rd Combat Aviation Brigade from 2011 to 2014; the Army Special Operations Aviation Command from 2018 to 2020; and the Army Military District of Washington and Joint Force Headquarters National Capital Region from 2021 to 2023. He then served as the Chief of Staff of the North American Aerospace Defense Command (NORAD) and the United States Northern Command (USNORTHCOM) from 2023 to 2024.

== Early life and education ==
Pepin is a native of Tewksbury, Massachusetts and grew up in a military family. He graduated from Tewksbury Memorial High School in 1984, and graduated from Wentworth Institute of Technology in 1988 with a Bachelor of Science degree in architectural engineering.

His military education includes the U.S. Army Aviation Basic Officer Course and Flight School, Rappel Master Course, Cavalry Leaders Course, Armor Advanced Course, Jump Master Course, Command and General Staff College, and the Naval War College. He also holds Master of Science degrees in business management and national security and strategic studies.

== Army career ==
Pepin was commissioned as an Aviation officer of the United States Army in 1988 from the Army Reserve Officers' Training Corps at Northeastern University. His first assignment was as platoon leader of C Troop of 3rd Squadron, 4th Cavalry Regiment, 3rd Infantry Division in Germany. Pepin later commanded the headquarters and headquarters company of the 1st Battalion, 187th Infantry Regiment. In 1996 he completed the assessment to join the 160th Special Operations Aviation Regiment (Airborne). As an AH-6 Little Bird company commander (Bravo Company, Task Force 1, 160th SOAR), he participated in the 2001 invasion of Afghanistan. Pepin later commanded the 1st Battalion, 145th Aviation Regiment. He as deployed for the 2003 invasion of Iraq as a staff officer of the 82nd Aviation Brigade, and later returned to the 160th SOAR in 2005.

He had additional deployments to Iraq and Afghanistan in the 160th SOAR, where he served as Task Force 1 commander. Pepin also served in the 101st Airborne Division, as battalion intelligence officer for 1st Attack Battalion, 101st Aviation Brigade. Pepin led the 3rd Combat Aviation Brigade from 2011 to 2014, which included a deployment to Afghanistan. He was later the chief of staff of the U.S. Army Aviation Center of Excellence at Fort Rucker, Alabama, and then served as the executive officer to the Commanding General of the United States Army Forces Command, Lt. Gen. Robert B. Abrams, starting from 2016. In June 2018, Pepin became commander of the United States Army Special Operations Aviation Command. He relinquished command in June 2020.

In July 2020, Pepin became deputy commanding general of the United States Army Special Operations Command, serving in that post until May 2021. In June 2021 he became commanding general of the United States Army Military District of Washington and Joint Task Force National Capital Region. Pepin relinquished command of the military district and the joint task force in June 2023. From July 2023 to July 2024, he served as chief of staff of the United States Northern Command. He was a special assistant to the Commanding General, Army Installation Management Command, from July to December 2024. In September 2024, Pepin was nominated for promotion to lieutenant general and assignment as commanding general of United States Army North.

Pepin assumed command of U.S. Army North in San Antonio, Texas, on 16 December 2024. In July 2025, he visited troops that were deployed to protect federal buildings during the Los Angeles protests, as part of the Northern Command's Joint Task Force 51. Army North was designated to become part of the newly created United States Army Western Hemisphere Command, and on 15 July 2026, Pepin took part in the casing of the colors ceremony that marked the deactivation of the unit, as its final commanding general.

== Personal life ==
Pepin is married to a Department of the Army civilian attorney and has two children.

Military offices
Preceded by John R. Evans Jr.	Commanding General of the U.S. Army Special Operations Aviation Command; 2018–2020	Succeeded by Philip J. Ryan
Preceded by James E. Kraft	Deputy Commanding General of the United States Army Special Operations Command; 2020–2021	Succeeded by Steven M. Marks
Preceded by Omar Jones	Commanding General of United States Army Military District of Washington and Joint Force Headquarters National Capital Region; 2021–2023	Succeeded by Trevor J. Bredenkamp
Preceded by Daniel L. Cheever	Chief of Staff of the United States Northern Command; 2023–2024	Succeeded by John V. Meyer III
Preceded by Scott M. Sherman; Acting	Commanding General of United States Army North; 2024–2026	Unit deactivated
