= Patrick Frank =

American general

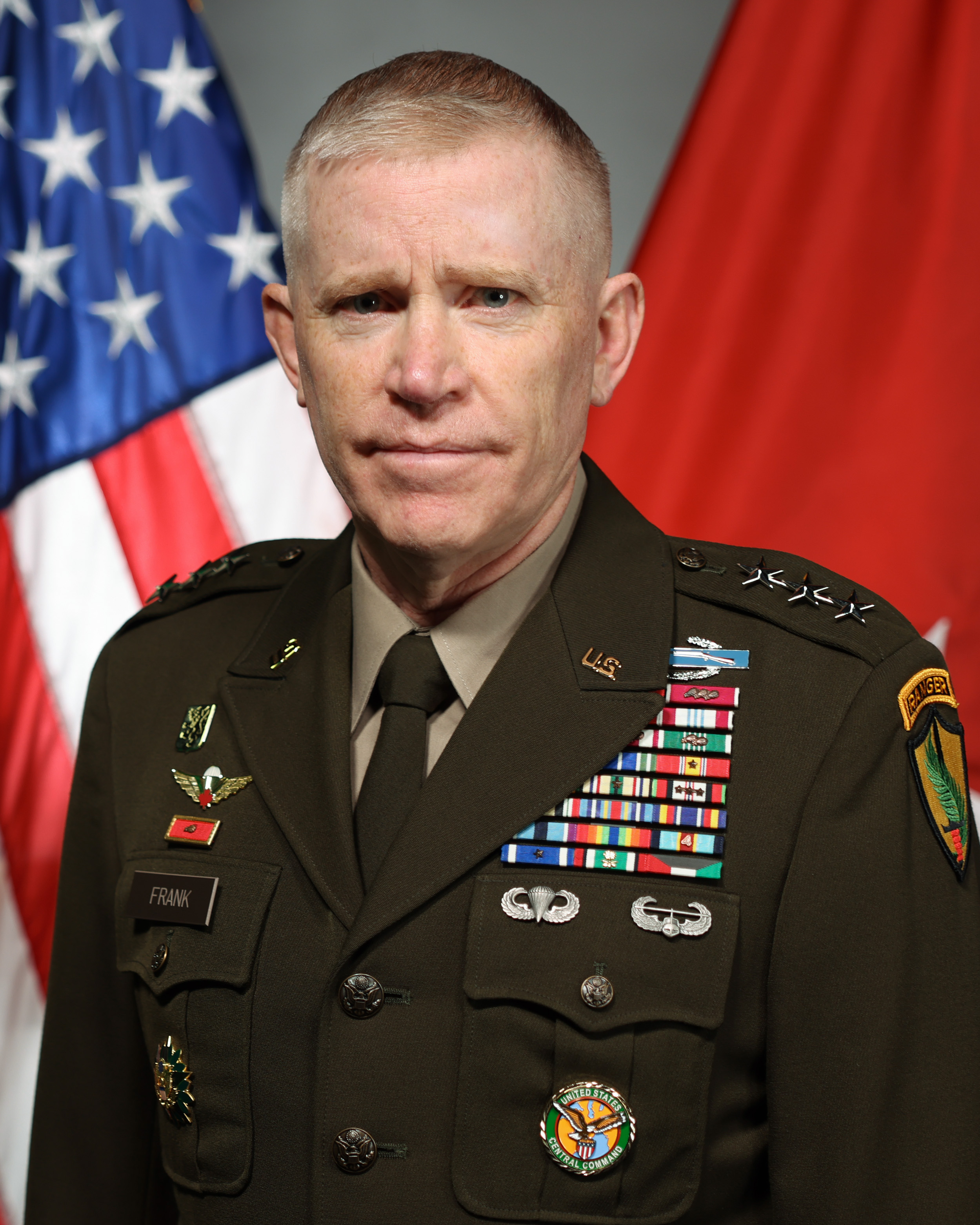
- Official portrait, 2026
- Education: St. Bonaventure University (BA); Maxwell School (MPA); United States Army War College (MS); United States Naval War College (MS)
- Military career
- Allegiance: United States
- Branch: United States Army
- Service years: 1989–present
- Rank: Lieutenant General
- Commands: United States Northern Command; North American Aerospace Defense Command; United States Army Central; Joint Readiness Training Center; 3rd Brigade Combat Team, 10th Mountain Division; 1st Battalion, 28th Infantry
- Conflicts: Gulf War; Operation Uphold Democracy; Iraq War; War in Afghanistan; 2026 Iran war
- Awards: Army Distinguished Service Medal; Legion of Merit; Bronze Star Medal (3)

Patrick D. Frank is an American lieutenant general who has served as the deputy commander of the United States Central Command since 2026. He previously served as commanding general of United States Army Central from 2022 to 2026.

Frank graduated from St. Bonaventure University's Army Reserve Officers' Training Corps in 1989 and was commissioned as an Infantry officer. He has participated in the Gulf War and the Iraq War, Operation Restore Democracy in Haiti, and led the 3rd Brigade Combat Team, 10th Mountain Division, during the war in Afghanistan. Frank later served as commanding general of the Joint Readiness Training Center and Fort Polk, Louisiana, from 2018 to 2020, and as the chief of staff of the United States Central Command from 2020 to 2022.

Frank became the longest serving commander of U.S. Army Central, and his tenure coincided with the 2026 Iran war, during which he directed air defenses against Iranian missiles and drones.

== Early life and education ==
Frank earned a Bachelor of Arts degree in finance from St. Bonaventure University in 1989. He later received a Master of Public Administration degree from the Maxwell School at Syracuse University, a master's degree in national security and strategic studies from the Naval War College and a Master of Strategic Studies degree from the United States Army War College.

== Military career ==
Frank attended St. Bonaventure University on an Army Reserve Officers' Training Corps scholarship and was commissioned as an Infantry second lieutenant when he graduated in 1989. His first assignment was as a platoon leader in the 3rd Infantry Division in Germany from 1990 to 1993, with service in the Gulf War. He then attended the Infantry Officer Advanced Course, after which, from 1993 to 1999, Frank served at Fort Drum, New York, in several roles in the 174th Infantry Brigade and the 10th Mountain Division. He deployed to Haiti during Operation Uphold Democracy in 1994 as a staff officer.

After completing the College of Naval Command and Staff, from 2000 to 2004 Frank was stationed at Fort Campbell, Kentucky, serving with the 101st Airborne Division as an S-3 officer at several levels. During that time he was deployed for and saw combat in the 2003 invasion of Iraq. From 2004 to 2005 he was aide-de-camp to the United States Secretary of the Army, before serving as commander of the 1st Battalion, 28th Infantry Regiment, 1st Infantry Division. While commanding the battalion he was deployed to Iraq again during the Iraq War troop surge.

Frank served as the G-3 officer of the 1st Infantry Division before taking command of the 3rd Brigade Combat Team, 10th Mountain Division, from 2010 to 2012. In that capacity he was deployed to Kandahar in the Islamic Republic of Afghanistan during Operation Enduring Freedom. He then served as Executive Officer to the Vice Chief of Staff of the United States Army before returning to Afghanistan as Executive Officer to the commander of the International Security Assistance Force and the Resolute Support Mission from 2014 to 2015.

He became deputy commanding general (support) of 1st Infantry Division on 8 September 2015 and was promoted to brigadier general on 2 December 2015. From October 2016 to July 2017 he was deputy commanding general of 1st Infantry Division and acting senior commander of Fort Riley, Kansas. Frank was deputy commanding general of United States Army Cadet Command from September 2017 to February 2018, and then served as commanding general of the Joint Readiness Training Center and Fort Polk, Louisiana, until October 2020. He was promoted to major general on 30 September 2020. He served as chief of staff of the United States Central Command at MacDill Air Force Base, Florida, from October 2020 to June 2022.

=== ARCENT and CENTCOM ===
Frank assumed command of United States Army Central and was promoted to lieutenant general on 7 July 2022 at Shaw Air Force Base, South Carolina.

On 1 October 2025, he met with Lieutenant General Fahd al-Juhani, the commander of the Royal Saudi Land Forces, to discuss bilateral military cooperation. The U.S. government also appointed Frank as the military head for a Civil-Military Coordination Center in Israel later that month, working to implement the Gaza peace plan and get humanitarian aid into the Palestinian enclave.

He was nominated to become deputy commander of the United States Central Command, with the grade of lieutenant general, in December 2025. Frank has directed the defense against Iranian missiles and drones during the Iran war that began on 28 February 2026. He relinquished command of U.S. Army Central on 4 June 2026, after having become its longest-serving commander, and took over the role of CENTCOM deputy commander on 30 June 2026.

== Dates of promotion ==
Rank	Branch	Date
Second lieutenant	Army	22 September 1989
First lieutenant	Army	
Captain	Army	
Major	Army	10 October 1998
Lieutenant colonel	Army	30 September 2004
Colonel	Army	8 December 2008
Brigadier general	Army	2 December 2015
Major general	Army	30 September 2020
Lieutenant general	Army	7 July 2022

== Personal life ==
He is married to Jennifer, an attorney from Sackets Harbor, New York.

Military offices
Preceded by Robert W. Bennett Jr	Deputy Commanding General of the United States Army Cadet Command; 2017–2018	Succeeded by John R. Evans Jr.
Preceded by Gary M. Brito	Commanding General of the Joint Readiness Training Center; 2018–2020	Succeeded by David S. Doyle
Preceded by Scott McKean	Chief of Staff of the United States Central Command; 2020–2022	Succeeded by David S. Doyle
Preceded by Ronald P. Clark	Commanding General of United States Army Central; 2022–2026	Succeeded by Kevin C. Leahy
Preceded by Kevin C. Leahy; Acting	Deputy Commander of the United States Central Command; 2026–present	Incumbent
