= Leadership of the United States Central Command =

U.S. Central Command leadership

Seal of the United States Central Command

This is a list of all commanders, deputy commanders, senior enlisted leaders, and chiefs of staff of the United States Central Command.

== Current combatant command staff ==
- Charles B. Cooper II, Commander
  - Patrick D. Frank, Deputy Commander
    - Richard A. Harrison, Chief of Staff
      - Constantin E. Nicolet , Director, Intelligence (J2)
      - Curtis R. Bass, Director, Operations (J3)
        - David R. Lopez, Deputy Director, Operations
      - Michael B. Siegl, Director, Logistics (J4)
      - Adan G. Cruz, Director, Strategy, Plans, and Policy (J5)
      - James D. Turinetti IV, Director, Cyber (J6)

== List of leaders of the United States Central Command ==
=== Commanders ===
Commander of the United States Central Command
- Emblem of the United States Central Command

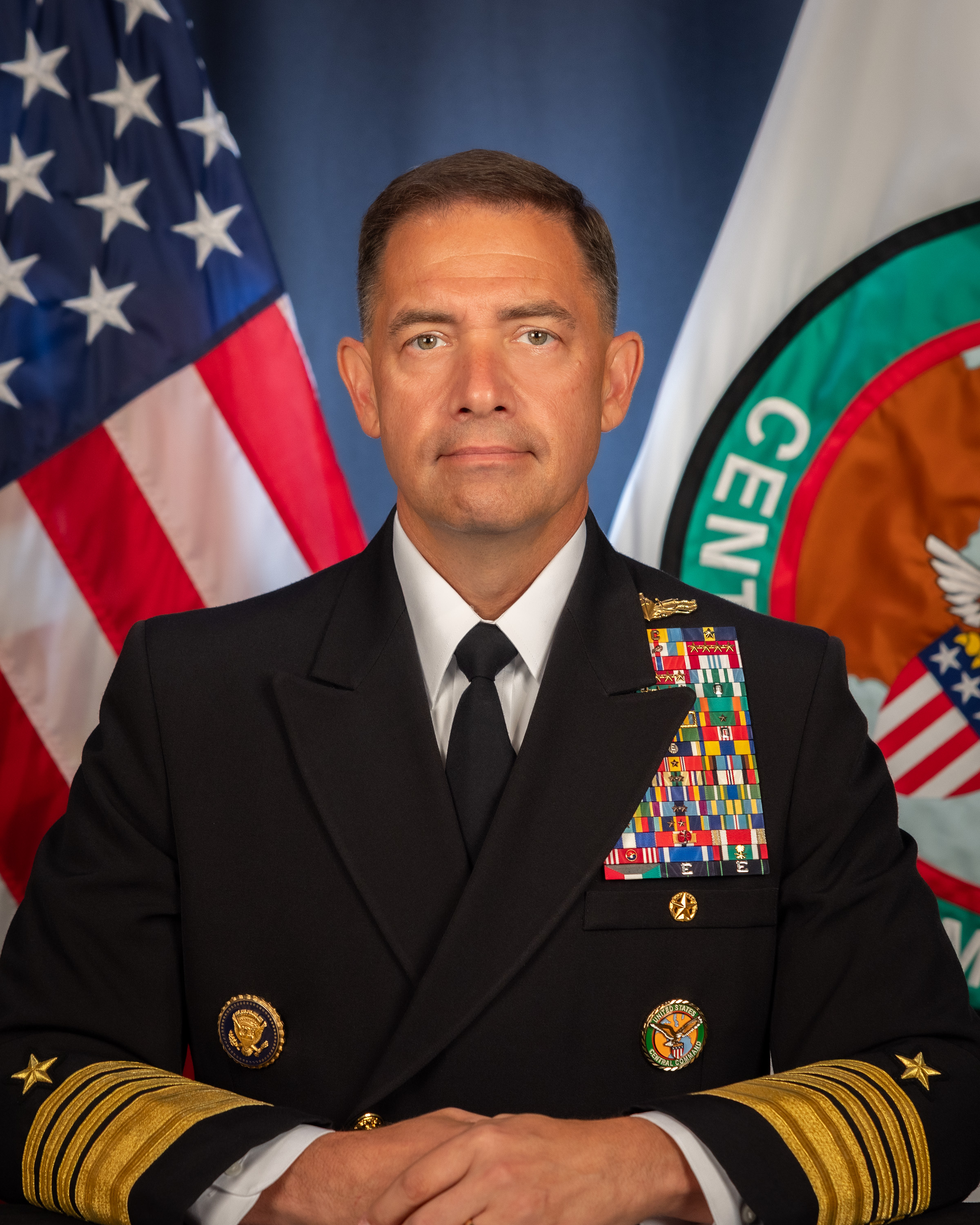
- Incumbent; Admiral Charles B. Cooper II, USN since 8 August 2025
- United States Department of Defense
- Type: Unified combatant commander
- Abbreviation: CDRUSCENTCOM
- Reports to: President of the United States; Secretary of Defense
- Seat: MacDill Air Force Base, Florida, U.S.
- Nominator: Secretary of Defense
- Appointer: The president with Senate advice and consent
- Term length: 2–3 years (approx.)
- Constituting instrument: 10 U.S.C. § 167
- Formation: 1 January 1983
- First holder: Robert Kingston
- Deputy: Deputy Commander, United States Central Command

No.	Commander		Term			Service branch
No.	Portrait	Name	Took office	Left office	Term length	Service branch
1	Robert Kingston	General; Robert Kingston (1928–2007)	1 January 1983	27 November 1985	2 years, 330 days	U.S. Army
2	George B. Crist	General; George B. Crist (1931–2024)	27 November 1985	23 November 1988	2 years, 362 days	U.S. Marine Corps
3	Norman Schwarzkopf Jr.	General; Norman Schwarzkopf Jr. (1934–2012)	23 November 1988	9 August 1991	2 years, 259 days	U.S. Army
4	Joseph P. Hoar	General; Joseph P. Hoar (1934–2022)	9 August 1991	5 August 1994	2 years, 361 days	U.S. Marine Corps
5	J. H. Binford Peay III	General; J. H. Binford Peay III (born 1940)	5 August 1994	13 August 1997	3 years, 8 days	U.S. Army
6	Anthony Zinni	General; Anthony Zinni (born 1943)	13 August 1997	6 July 2000	2 years, 328 days	U.S. Marine Corps
7	Tommy Franks	General; Tommy Franks (born 1945)	6 July 2000	7 July 2003	3 years, 1 day	U.S. Army
8	John Abizaid	General; John Abizaid (born 1951)	7 July 2003	16 March 2007	3 years, 252 days	U.S. Army
9	William J. Fallon	Admiral; William J. Fallon (born 1944)	16 March 2007	28 March 2008	1 year, 12 days	U.S. Navy
-	Martin Dempsey	Lieutenant General; Martin Dempsey (born 1952); Acting	28 March 2008	31 October 2008	217 days	U.S. Army
10	David Petraeus	General; David Petraeus (born 1952)	31 October 2008	30 June 2010	1 year, 242 days	U.S. Army
-	John R. Allen	Lieutenant General; John R. Allen (born 1953); Acting	30 June 2010	11 August 2010	42 days	U.S. Marine Corps
11	Jim Mattis	General; Jim Mattis (born 1950)	11 August 2010	22 March 2013	2 years, 223 days	U.S. Marine Corps
12	Lloyd Austin	General; Lloyd Austin (born 1953)	22 March 2013	30 March 2016	3 years, 8 days	U.S. Army
13	Joseph Votel	General; Joseph Votel (born 1958)	30 March 2016	28 March 2019	2 years, 363 days	U.S. Army
14	Kenneth F. McKenzie Jr.	General; Kenneth F. McKenzie Jr. (born 1957)	28 March 2019	1 April 2022	3 years, 4 days	U.S. Marine Corps
15	Michael Kurilla	General; Michael Kurilla (born 1966)	1 April 2022	8 August 2025	3 years, 129 days	U.S. Army
16	Charles B. Cooper II	Admiral; Charles B. Cooper II (born 1967)	8 August 2025	Incumbent	1 year, 30 days	U.S. Navy

=== Deputy commanders ===
No.	Deputy Commander		Term			Service branch
No.	Portrait	Name	Took office	Left office	Term length	Service branch
1	Robert C. Taylor	Major General; Robert C. Taylor	1 January 1983	August 1984	~1 year, 227 days	U.S. Air Force
2	Davis C. Rohr	Major General; Davis C. Rohr (born 1929)	August 1984	~1 June 1987	~2 years, 290 days	U.S. Air Force
3	Craven C. Rogers Jr.	Major General; Craven C. Rogers Jr. (1934–2016)	~31 October 1988	1991	~2 years, 242 days	U.S. Air Force
4	James R. Ellis Jr.	Major General; James R. Ellis Jr. (born 1937)	1991	July 1992	~1 year, 15 days	U.S. Army
5	Waldo D. Freeman	Major General; Waldo D. Freeman	July 1992	August 1994	~2 years, 31 days	U.S. Army
6	Richard I. Neal	Lieutenant General; Richard I. Neal (1942–2022)	August 1994	~19 September 1996	~2 years, 35 days	U.S. Marine Corps
7	Anthony Zinni	Lieutenant General; Anthony Zinni (born 1943)	~19 September 1996	13 August 1997	~328 days	U.S. Marine Corps
8	Thomas R. Case	Lieutenant General; Thomas R. Case (born 1946)	13 August 1997	October 1998	~1 year, 63 days	U.S. Air Force
9	Mike Dodson	Lieutenant General; Mike Dodson	October 1998	~8 September 2000	~1 year, 329 days	U.S. Army
10	Michael P. DeLong	Lieutenant General; Michael P. DeLong (1945–2018)	11 September 2000	October 2003	~3 years, 34 days	U.S. Marine Corps
11	Lance L. Smith	Lieutenant General; Lance L. Smith (born 1946)	October 2003	November 2005	~2 years, 31 days	U.S. Air Force
12	David C. Nichols	Vice Admiral; David C. Nichols (born 1950)	November 2005	August 2007	~1 year, 273 days	U.S. Navy
13	Martin Dempsey	Lieutenant General; Martin Dempsey (born 1952)	August 2007	23 March 2008	221 days	U.S. Army
14	John R. Allen	Lieutenant General; John R. Allen (born 1953)	15 July 2008	18 July 2011	3 years, 3 days	U.S. Marine Corps
15	Robert Harward	Vice Admiral; Robert Harward (born 1956)	18 July 2011	October 2013	~2 years, 78 days	U.S. Navy
16	Mark I. Fox	Vice Admiral; Mark I. Fox (born 1956)	October 2013	April 2016	~2 years, 183 days	U.S. Navy
17	Charles Q. Brown Jr.	Lieutenant General; Charles Q. Brown Jr. (born 1962)	~22 July 2016	~26 July 2018	~2 years, 4 days	U.S. Air Force
18	Thomas W. Bergeson	Lieutenant General; Thomas W. Bergeson (born 1962)	~27 August 2018	21 September 2020	~2 years, 25 days	U.S. Air Force
19	James J. Malloy	Vice Admiral; James J. Malloy (born 1963)	21 September 2020	~21 July 2022	~1 year, 303 days	U.S. Navy
20	Gregory Guillot	Lieutenant General; Gregory Guillot	~21 July 2022	5 February 2024	~1 year, 199 days	U.S. Air Force
21	Charles B. Cooper II	Vice Admiral; Charles B. Cooper II (born 1967)	12 February 2024	8 August 2025	1 year, 177 days	U.S. Navy
-	Sean M. Salene	Major General; Sean M. Salene; Acting	8 August 2025	23 December 2025	137 days	U.S. Marine Corps
-	Kevin C. Leahy	Major General; Kevin C. Leahy; Acting	23 December 2025	3 March 2026	70 days	U.S. Army
22	Patrick D. Frank	Lieutenant General; Patrick D. Frank	3 March 2026	Incumbent	188 days	U.S. Army

=== Senior enlisted leaders ===
No.	Senior enlisted leader		Term			Service branch
No.	Portrait	Name	Took office	Left office	Term length	Service branch
9	Curtis L. Brownhill	Command Master Sergeant; Curtis L. Brownhill	February 2004	12 April 2007	~3 years, 56 days	U.S. Air Force
10	Jeffrey A. Morin	Sergeant Major; Jeffrey A. Morin	12 April 2007	December 2008	~1 year, 247 days	U.S. Marine Corps
11	Marvin L. Hill	Command Sergeant Major; Marvin L. Hill	December 2008	August 2010	~1 year, 243 days	U.S. Army
12	Frank A. Grippe	Command Sergeant Major; Frank A. Grippe	3 January 2011	July 2014	~3 years, 193 days	U.S. Army
13	Christopher K. Greca	Command Sergeant Major; Christopher K. Greca	July 2014	July 2016	~2 years	U.S. Army
14	William F. Thetford	Command Sergeant Major; William F. Thetford	~29 August 2016	~29 July 2019	~2 years, 334 days	U.S. Army
15	James Herdel	Fleet Master Chief; James Herdel	~29 July 2019	~12 July 2022	~2 years, 348 days	U.S. Navy
16	Derrick A. Walters	Fleet Master Chief; Derrick A. Walters	~12 July 2022	8 September 2025	~3 years, 58 days	U.S. Navy
17	Lateef N. Compton	Fleet Master Chief; Lateef N. Compton	8 September 2025	Incumbent	364 days	U.S. Navy

=== Chiefs of staff ===
No.	Chief of Staff		Term			Service branch
No.	Portrait	Name	Took office	Left office	Term length	Service branch
-	Harry D. Penzler	Major General; Harry D. Penzler (1934–2020)	~1986	~1 November 1988	~2 years, 124 days	U.S. Army
-	Joseph P. Hoar	Major General; Joseph P. Hoar (1934–2022)	~1 November 1988	June 1990	~1 year, 226 days	U.S. Marine Corps
-	R. Steven Whitcomb	Major General; R. Steven Whitcomb (born 1948)	19 January 2003	7 July 2004	1 year, 170 days	U.S. Army
-	John G. Castellaw	Major General; John G. Castellaw	7 July 2004	15 September 2005	1 year, 70 days	U.S. Marine Corps
-	Lloyd Austin	Major General; Lloyd Austin (born 1953)	15 September 2005	27 October 2006	~1 year, 42 days	U.S. Army
-	Timothy F. Ghormley	Major General; Timothy F. Ghormley	27 October 2006	July 2007	~1 year, 303 days	U.S. Marine Corps
-	Thomas L. Moore Jr.	Major General; Thomas L. Moore Jr.	July 2007	1 July 2008	~352 days	U.S. Marine Corps
-	Jay W. Hood	Major General; Jay W. Hood	1 July 2008	6 August 2010	2 years, 36 days	U.S. Army
-	Michael D. Jones	Major General; Michael D. Jones	6 August 2010	18 July 2011	346 days	U.S. Army
-	Karl R. Horst	Major General; Karl R. Horst	18 July 2011	August 2013	~2 years, 28 days	U.S. Army
-	Michael X. Garrett	Major General; Michael X. Garrett (born 1961)	August 2013	~29 August 2016	~3 years, 14 days	U.S. Army
-	Terry R. Ferrell	Major General; Terry R. Ferrell (born 1962)	~29 August 2016	~11 September 2018	~2 years, 13 days	U.S. Army
-	Michael Kurilla	Major General; Michael Kurilla (born 1966)	~11 September 2018	~22 August 2019	~345 days	U.S. Army
-	Scott McKean	Major General; Scott McKean (born 1968)	~22 August 2019	October 2020	~1 year, 54 days	U.S. Army
-	Patrick Frank	Major General; Patrick Frank	October 2020	June 2022	~1 year, 243 days	U.S. Army
-	David S. Doyle	Major General; David S. Doyle	~11 July 2022	6 June 2023	~330 days	U.S. Army
-	Brandon R. Tegtmeier	Major General; Brandon R. Tegtmeier	~6 June 2023	~June 2025	~1 year, 360 days	U.S. Army
-	Richard A. Harrison	Major General; Richard A. Harrison	~June 2025	Incumbent	~1 year, 98 days	U.S. Army

== See also ==
- United States Central Command
- Leadership of the United States Africa Command
- Leadership of the United States European Command
- Leadership of the United States Indo-Pacific Command
- Leadership of the United States Northern Command
- Leadership of the United States Space Command
- Leadership of the United States Cyber Command
- Leadership of the United States Strategic Command
- Leadership of the United States Transportation Command
