= U.S. Army Special Operations Aviation Command =

United States Army Special Operations Aviation Command (USASOAC)
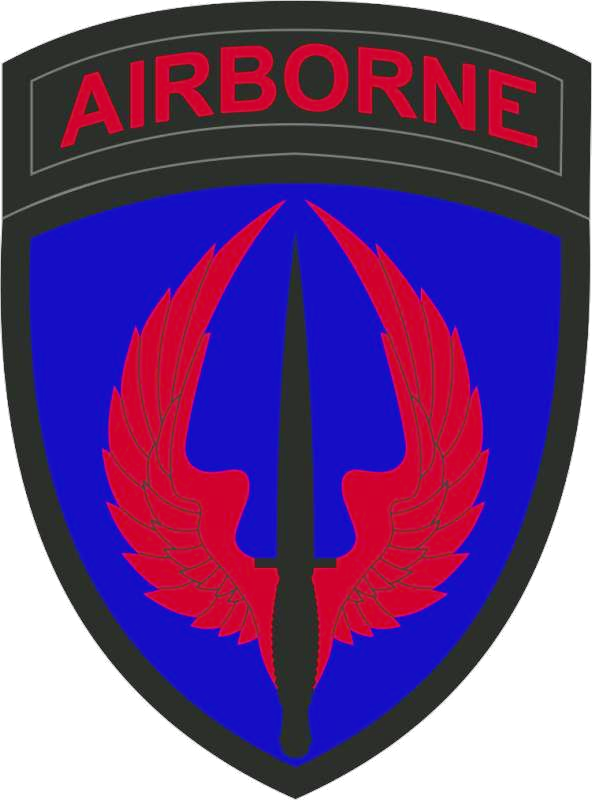
- USASOAC Shoulder Sleeve Insignia
- Founded: 2011–present
- Country: United States of America
- Branch: United States Army
- Type: Special operations force
- Role: Organizes, mans, trains, resources and equips special operations aviation units
- Size: 3,533 personnel authorized: 3,473 military personnel; 60 civilian personnel
- Part of: US Army Special Operations Command; United States Special Operations Command
- Garrison/HQ: Fort Bragg, North Carolina
- Motto: Volare Optimos (To Fly the Best)
- Color of beret: Maroon
- Engagements: Operation Enduring Freedom; Operation New Dawn; Operation Inherent Resolve
- Website: Official Website

Commanders
- Current commander: COL Roger P. Waleski Jr.

Insignia
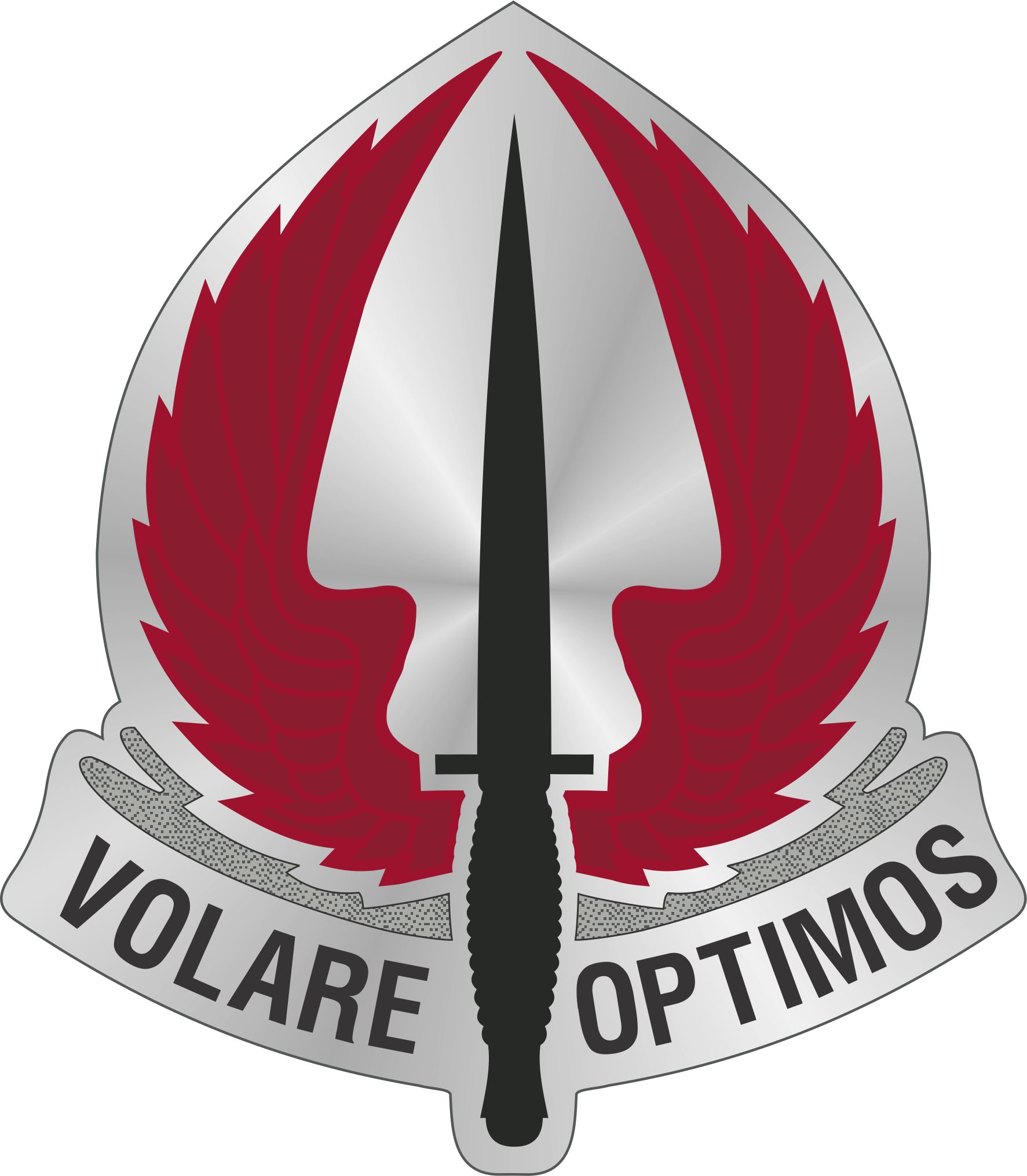
- Distinctive unit insignia

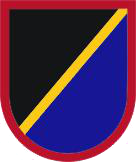
- Beret flash

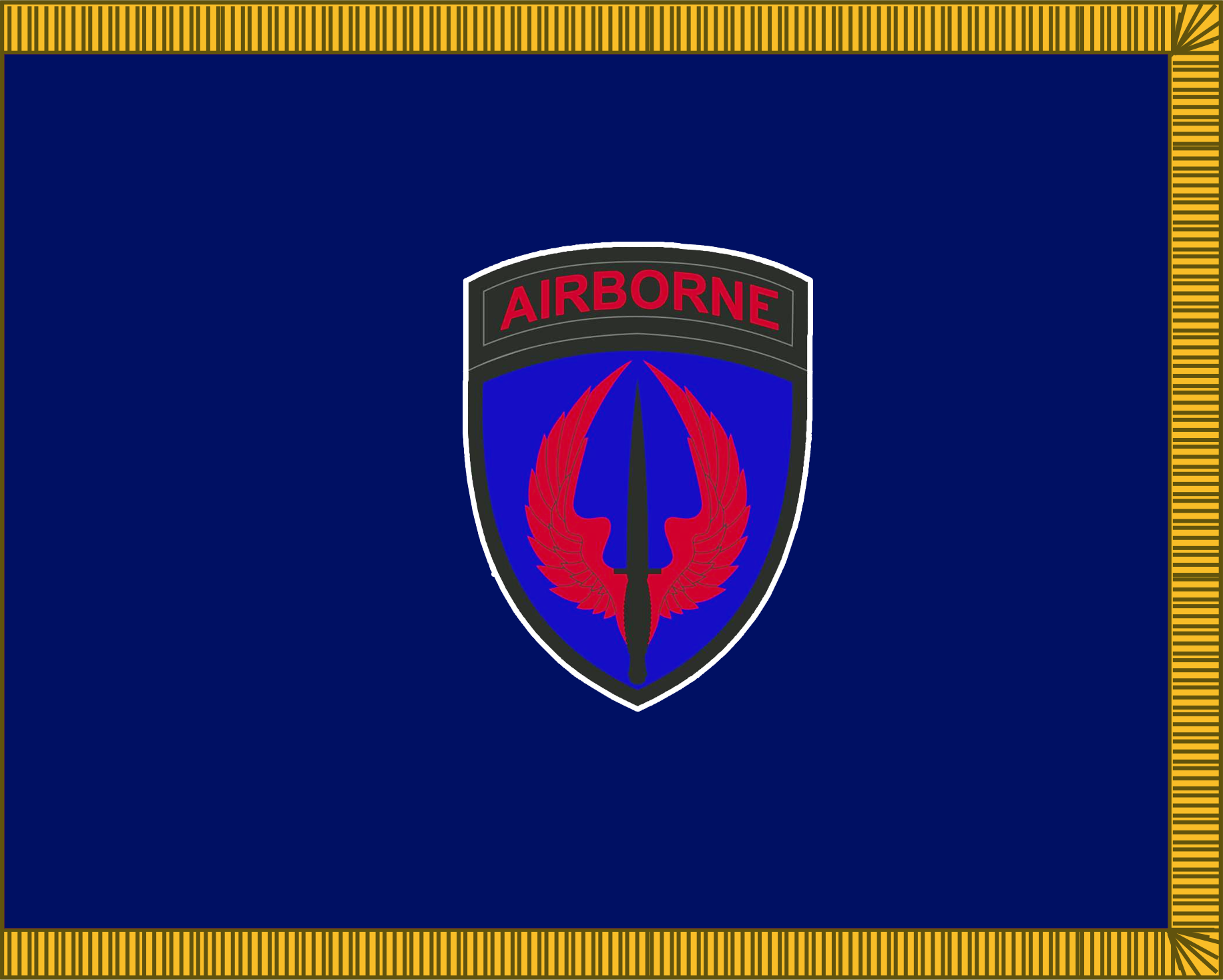
- US Army Special Operations Aviation Command Flag

The United States Army Special Operations Aviation Command (USASOAC) provides command and control, executive oversight, and resourcing of U.S. Army Special Operations Command (USASOC) aviation assets and units in support of national security objectives. USASOAC is responsible for service and component interface; training, doctrine, and proponency for Army Special Operations Aviation (SOA); system integration and fleet modernization; aviation resource management; material readiness; program management; and ASCC oversight. USASOAC was established 25 March 2011 consisting of 135 headquarters soldiers and subordinate units totaling more than 3,300 personnel, include the 160th Special Operations Aviation Regiment (Airborne), (160th SOAR (A)) which features 4 Aviation Battalions, the USASOC Flight Company, the Special Operations Aviation Training Battalion, the Systems Integration Management Office, and the Technology Application Projects Office. The first commander of USASOAC was Brig Gen. Kevin Mangum.

== Army Special Operations Aviation history ==
As reported on the USASOC official website:

Special operations aviation traces its modern roots back to the early 1960s and the formation of special warfare aviation detachments (SWAD) and finally a task-organized helicopter company as Army Special Forces prepared for Vietnam.

The 22nd SWAD was activated in March 1962 at Fort Bragg, N.C: In June 1962 the unit was reorganized and redesignated as the 22nd Aviation Detachment (Special Forces). The unit supported 5th Special Forces Group (Airborne) (5th SFG (A)), 7th Special Forces Group (Airborne) (7th SFG (A)), U.S. Army John F. Kennedy Special Warfare Center and School, and the 1st and 13th Psychological Warfare Battalions. The detachment was inactivated in December 1963. The 23rd SWAD (Surveillance) was organized in July 1962 and flew the OV-1. The unit deployed to the Nha Trang, Republic of Vietnam in September 1962 to support I Corps and Special Forces with photographic intelligence.

On 7 October 1965, the 281st Assault Helicopter Company, Airmobile Light was activated at Fort Benning. By 9 June the following year, the newly formed company set up its headquarters inside the 5th SFG compound at Nha Trang Bay, Republic of Vietnam.

The unit's mission was to provide air movement of troops, supplies, and equipment under the direct supervision of the commanding officer, 5th SFG. The 281st became the first organized special operations helicopter unit in the U.S. Army. Army historians consider the 281st to be the legacy unit for today's 160th Special Operations Aviation Regiment (Airborne), abbreviated as 160th SOAR(A). The unit earned decorations for Valor and Meritorious Service from the Army, Navy, and Republic of Vietnam.

In the years that followed, the individual SFGs had their own organic aviation detachment. These detachments usually consisted of 4 UH-1D helicopters, associated crewmen, and a limited maintenance capability.

As a result of the Desert One failed Iranian hostage rescue in April 1980, the Holloway Commission, chaired by the former Chief of Naval Operations, Admiral James L. Holloway, mandated a re-organization of the nation’s special operations capabilities, including a dedicated Special Operations Aviation force.

The Army looked to the 101st Aviation Group at Fort Campbell, the air arm of the 101st Airborne Division (Air Assault), which had the most diverse operating experience of the service's helicopter units, and selected elements selected Charlie and Delta companies (UH-60) of the 158th Aviation Battalion, individual members of the 229th Aviation Battalion (OH-6), and Alpha company of the 159th Aviation Battalion (CH-47) to form the basis of the unit.

The chosen pilots immediately entered intensive training in night flying. Dubbed Task Force 160, the new unit was quickly recognized as the Army's premier night fighting aviation force, and its only Special Operations Aviation force. As pilots completed training in the fall of 1980, a second hostage rescue attempt, code-named Operation Honey Badger, was planned for early 1981. It was called off when the hostages were released.

In October 1981, the unit was officially designated the 160th Aviation Battalion. The 160th first saw combat during 1983's Operation Urgent Fury, the U.S. invasion of Grenada. In 1986, the unit was re-designated as the 160th Aviation Group (Airborne). The modern-day 160th SOAR(A) was officially activated in June 1990.

As demand for highly-trained special operations aviation assets grew, the Regiment activated three Battalions, a separate detachment, and incorporated one Army National Guard Battalion. The three battalions replaced the separate aviation detachments at the SFGs.

In July 2007, the regiment activated a fourth battalion to meet growing special operations forces requirements. Eventually, the 2nd, 3rd, and 4th Battalions will be identically organized with two MH-47 companies, an MH-60 company, and a maintenance company.

In July 2010, a MQ-1C element from Fort Huachuca was assigned to USASOC. The element was rebranded with the USASOC patch and deployed to Afghanistan. In 2013, Fort Campbell welcomed the MQ-1C special operations element as E Company, 160th SOAR(A).

On 25 March 2011, USASOC created the U.S. Army Special Operations Aviation Command to organize, man, train, resource, and equip ARSOA units to provide responsive, special operations aviation support to special operations forces and is designed as the USASOC aviation staff proponent.

== USASOAC units ==
=== 160th Special Operations Aviation Regiment (Airborne) (160th SOAR (A)) ===
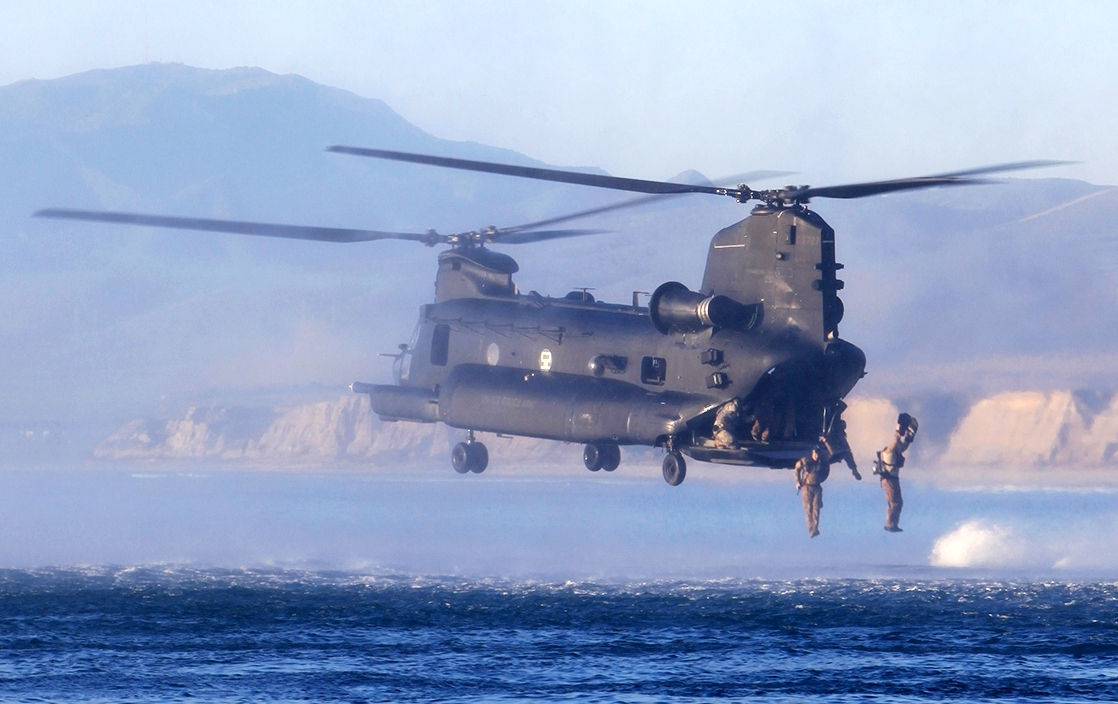
A 160th SOAR(A) MH-47 Chinook conducts water insertion training with MARSOC Marines

The 160th SOAR (A) has the mission to organize, equip, train, resource, and employ Army Special Operations Aviation (ARSOA) forces worldwide in support of contingency missions and combatant commanders. Known as "Night Stalkers," these soldiers are proficient in nighttime operations. They employ modified heavy assault versions of the MH-47 Chinook, medium assault and attack versions of the MH-60 Black Hawk, light assault and attack versions of the MH-6 Little Bird helicopters, and MQ-1C Gray Eagles via four battalions, two extended-range multi-purpose companies, a headquarters company, and a training company that are spread out between Fort Campbell, Hunter Army Airfield, and Gray Army Airfield.

=== USASOC Flight Company (UFC) ===
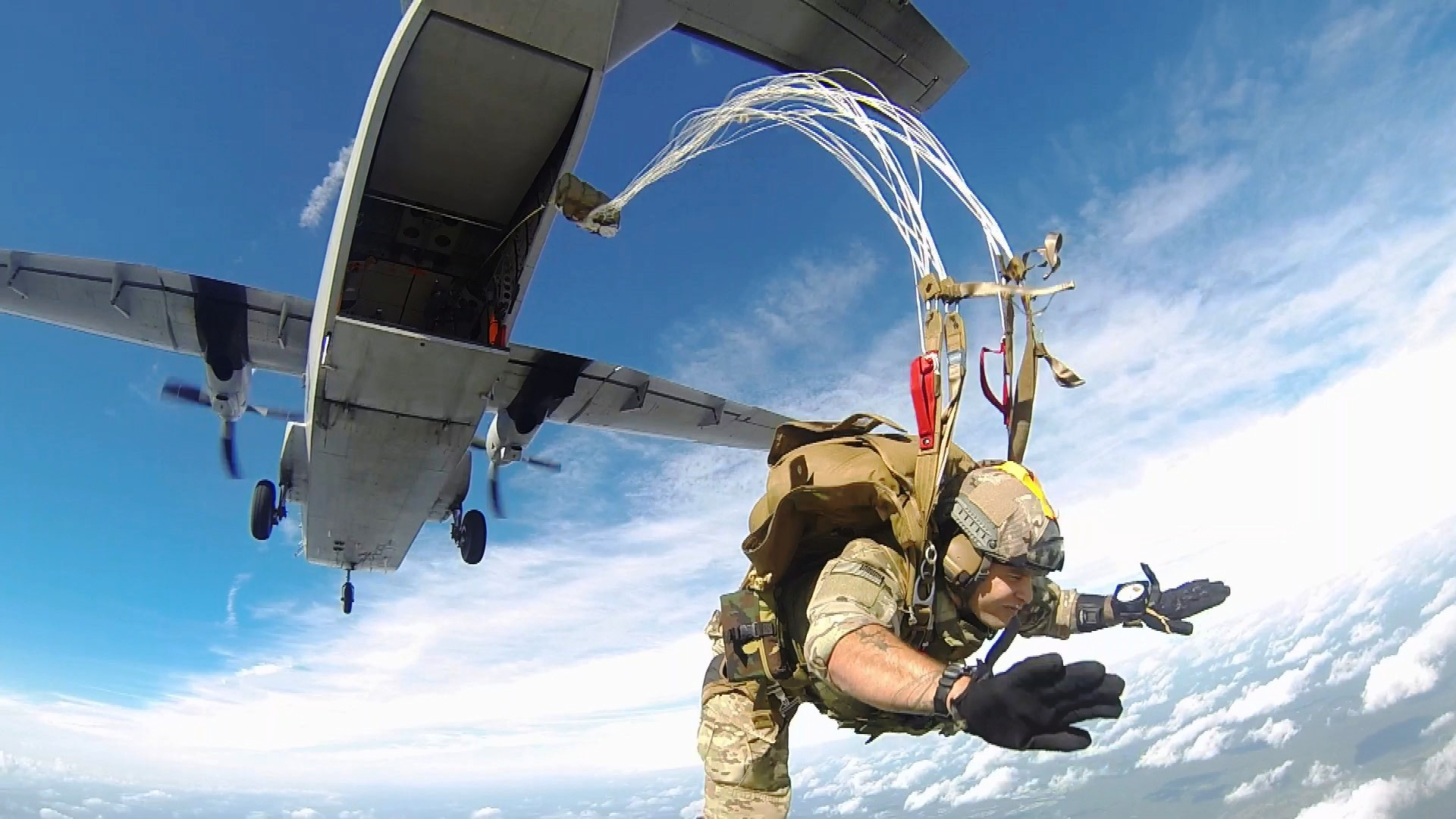
A USASOAC C-212 Aviocar supports an Airborne and Special Operations Test Directorate evaluation of the RA–1 MFF ARAPS double–bag static–line system over Ft. Bragg, circa 2018

The UFC was activated in June 2013 by USASOAC and provides responsive fixed and rotary wing training support to USASOC, as well as key planner transport in support of contingency plans. The company was a detachment that began its unique mission in 1996. Its aircraft inventory includes UH-60L Black Hawks, C-212 Aviocars, C-27J Spartans, UV-20 Porters, and C-12C Hurons.

=== Special Operations Aviation Training Battalion (SOATB) ===
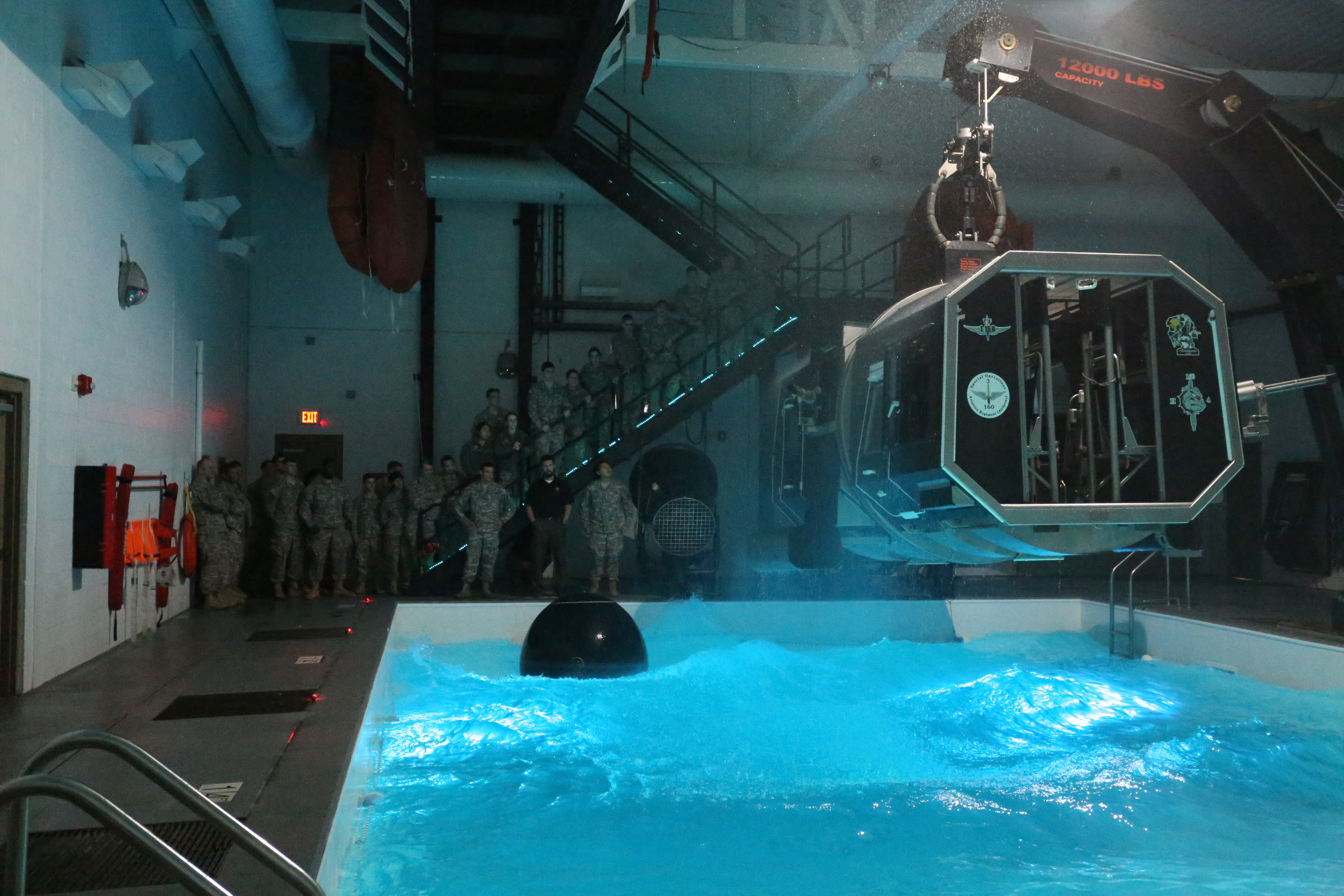
SOATB conduct downed aircraft and rescue training at the Allison Aquatics Training Facility

SOATB conducts basic Army Special Operations Aviation individual training and provides education in order to produce crew members and support personnel with basic and advanced qualifications for the 160th SOAR (A). The unit averages 235 training days per year including 80 officer graduates, 325 enlisted graduates, and 10,500 flight hours. Originally called "Green Platoon," ad hoc training functions began in 1983. In 1988, the unit was officially formed to centralize and standardize recruiting, assessment and training. In 1990 the mission scope expanded to all active and reserve components. Special Operations Aviation Training Company (SOATC) provisionally designated in 1992, and in 2010 officially re-designated as SOATB.

=== Technology Applications Program Office (TAPO) ===
TAPO is responsible for equipping the soldiers of the 160th SOAR(A) with the most capable rotary wing aircraft in the world, facilitating the sustainment of 160th SOAR(A) highly modified and/or unique aircraft, and responsible for life-cycle program management of the ARSOA fleet—involved from concept and refinement through disposal–facilitate aircraft modernization for the ARSOA fleet, and manage the USASOC rotary wing aviation night vision device and advanced aircraft survivability equipment programs. TAPO was classified prior to 1997. After 1997, the unit moved from St Louis, MO (adjacent to Army Aviation and Missile Command) to Joint Base Langley–Eustis, where the Program Office is currently co-located with the Aviation Applied Technology Directorate.

=== Systems Integration Management Office (SIMO) ===
SIMO is responsible for equipping the soldiers of the USASOAC Enterprise with the most capable rotary wing aircraft and mission systems in the world and facilitating the sustainment and improvement of USASOAC's highly modified and/or unique aircraft and mission systems. SIMO processes new requirements, product design, platform integration, development, product fielding, fleet resource planning, product organization, product support, property management, incremental product improvements, and rapid technology injection off the modernization cycle.

== List of commanders ==
- BG Kevin W. Mangum, 2009
- BG Clayton M. Hutmacher, 25 March 2011
- BG Erik C. Peterson, 10 June 2014
- BG John R. Evans Jr., July 2016
- BG Allan M. Pepin, 22 June 2018
- BG Philip J. Ryan, 26 June 2020
- BG Scott D. Wilkinson, 31 May 2023
- COL Roger P. Waleski Jr., 10 October 2024

== See also ==
- Air Force Special Operations Command
- Helicopter Sea Combat Squadron 85 (HSC-85)
