= John R. Evans Jr. =

U.S. Army general

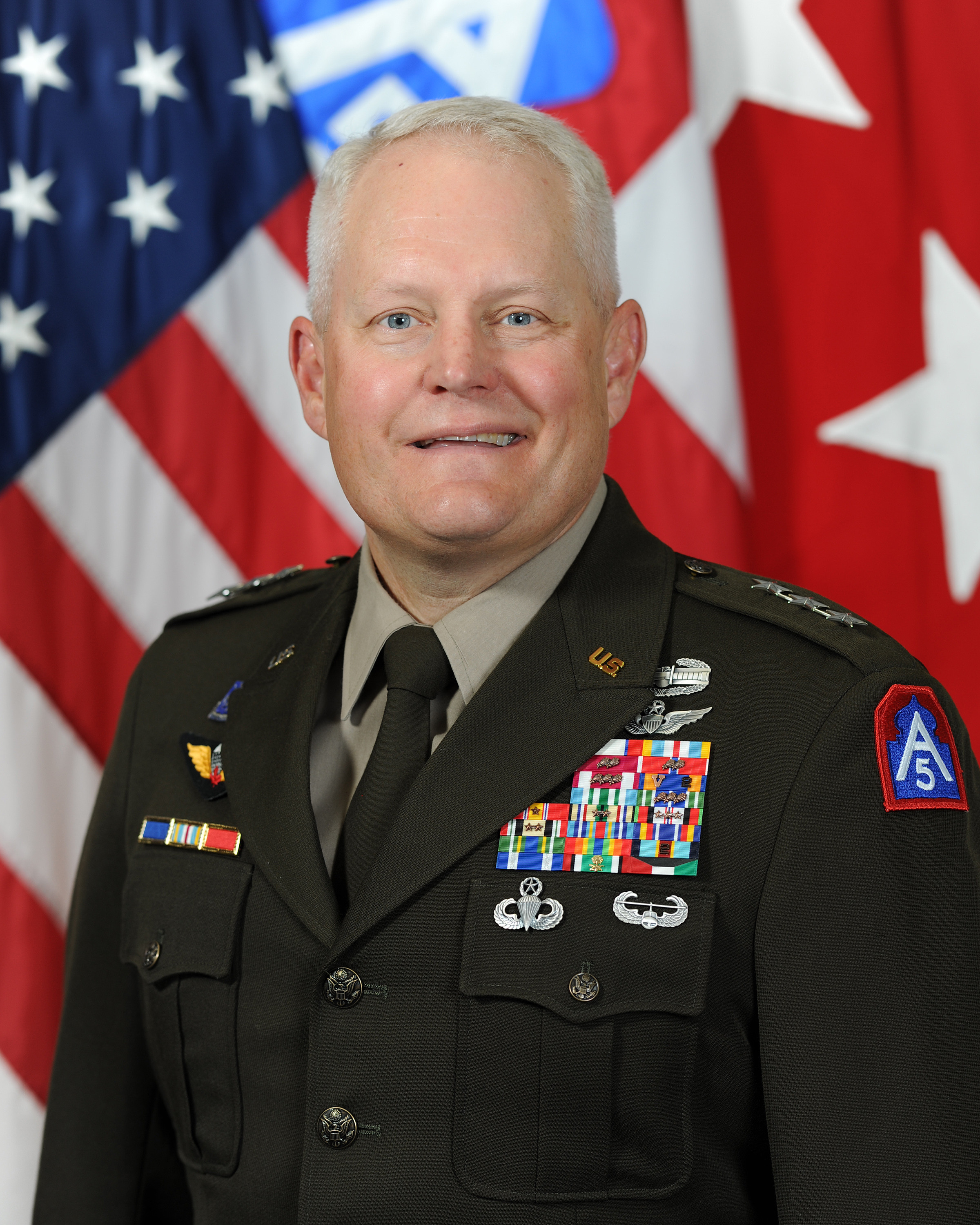
- Official portrait, 2021
- Military career
- Allegiance: United States
- Branch: United States Army
- Service years: 1989–2024
- Rank: Lieutenant General
- Nickname: Evans
- Commands: United States Army North; United States Army Cadet Command; Fort Knox; United States Army Special Operations Aviation Command; 160th Special Operations Aviation Regiment (Airborne); 2nd Battalion, 160th Special Operations Aviation Regiment (Airborne)
- Conflicts: Gulf War; War in Afghanistan; Iraq War
- Awards: Army Distinguished Service Medal (2); Defense Superior Service Medal; Legion of Merit (3); Bronze Star Medal (4)(V)

John R. Evans Jr. (born February 19, 1966) is a retired United States Army lieutenant general who last served as the commanding general of United States Army North from 2021 to 2024. He most recently served as the commanding general of the United States Army Cadet Command and Fort Knox from 2018 to 2021. Previously, he served as the commanding General of the United States Army Special Operations Aviation Command from 2016 to 2018.

Evans is a 1988 graduate of Appalachian State University with a Bachelor of Science degree in criminal justice. He completed flight training to become an army aviator in 1990. Evans later earned a Master of Arts degree in adult education from Kansas State University and a second Master of Arts degree in national security and strategic studies from the Naval War College. Evans additionally served as a Chief of Staff of the Army Federal Executive Fellow at the Brookings Institution in Washington, DC from 2014 to 2015.

Military offices
Preceded by Erik C. Peterson	Commanding General of the United States Army Special Operations Aviation Command; 2016–2018	Succeeded by Allan M. Pepin
Preceded by Christopher P. Hughes	Commanding General of the United States Army Cadet Command and Fort Knox; 2018–2021	Succeeded by Johnny K. Davis
Preceded by Laura J. Richardson	Commanding General of United States Army North; 2021–2024	Succeeded by Scott M. Sherman; Acting
