= Scott Sherman (general) =

US Army National Guard general

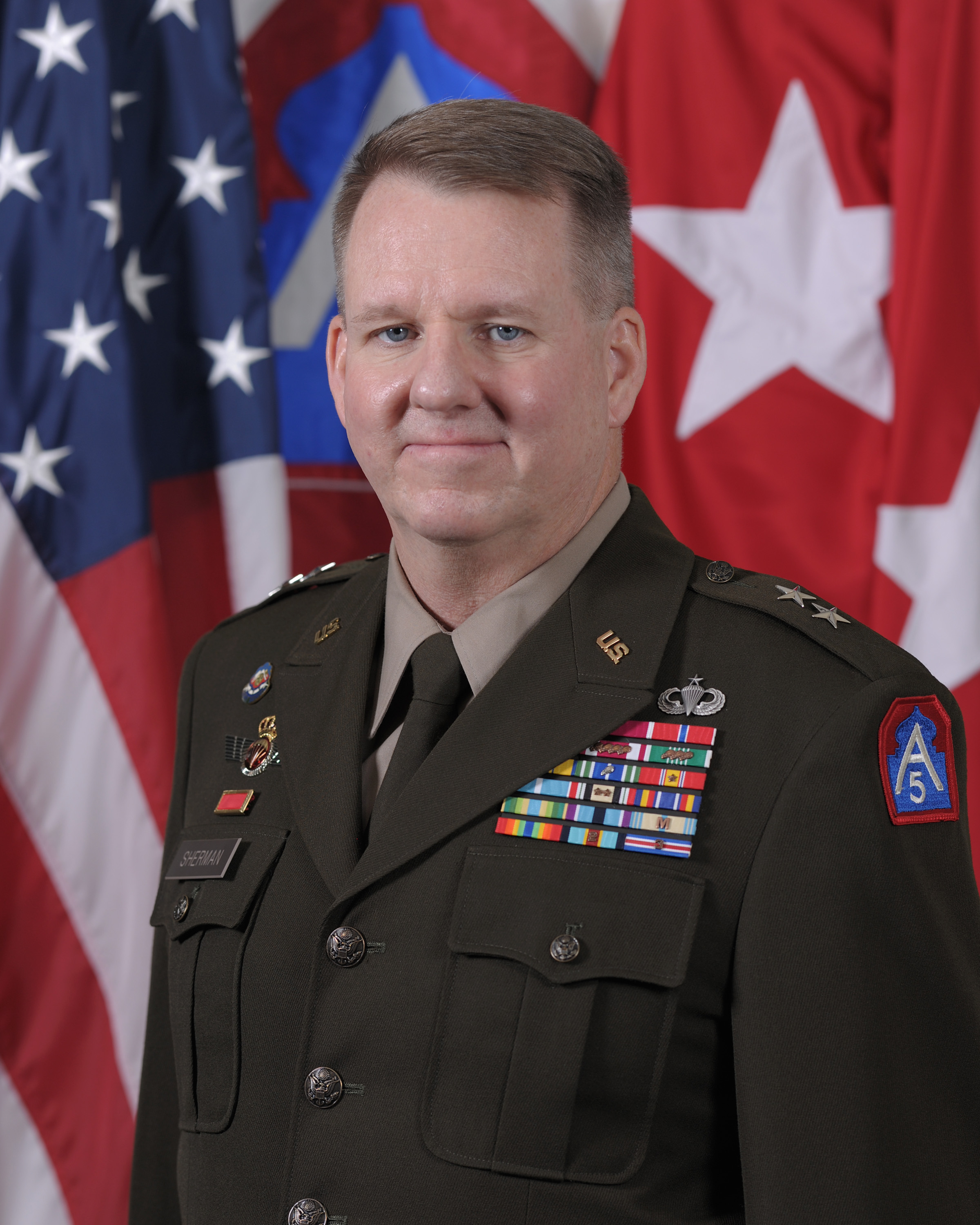
- Born: Scott M. Sherman
- Education: United States Military Academy (BS); Colorado State University (MBA); United States Army War College (MSS)
- Military career
- Allegiance: United States
- Branch: United States Army; Army National Guard
- Service years: 1992–2000 (active); 2000–2026 (National Guard)
- Rank: Major General
- Commands: United States Army North; Joint Task Force 51; 169th Field Artillery Brigade
- Conflicts: Iraq War
- Awards: Legion of Merit; Bronze Star Medal; Meritorious Service Medal

Scott M. Sherman is an American retired major general who last served as deputy commanding general of United States Army North for support and National Guard, as well as commander of Joint Task Force 51, from 2023 to 2026. He was also the acting commander of U.S. Army North in 2024.

== Biography ==
Sherman was commissioned as a second lieutenant in the Field Artillery Branch from the United States Military Academy in 1992, where he obtained a Bachelor of Science degree in Russian and Spanish. He remained on active duty until 1 September 2000. During that time Sherman was stationed in Vicenza, Italy, serving in the 325th Airborne Infantry Regiment and the 319th Airborne Field Artillery Regiment, and in Fort Riley, Kansas, serving in the 1st Field Artillery Regiment. He also obtained a Master of Business Administration degree from Colorado State University and a Master of Strategic Studies degree from the U.S. Army War College.

Following active duty, Sherman became a member of the Colorado Army National Guard, serving in the 157th Field Artillery Regiment. He deployed in support of Operation Noble Eagle from April 2003 to March 2004 and during the Iraq War from April 2006 to July 2007, the latter deployment being in Tikrit, Iraq, with the 25th Infantry Division. He later served as the executive officer and deputy commander of the 169th Field Artillery Brigade and commanded the 3rd Battalion, 157th Field Artillery. Between January 2013 and October 2017 he held several staff positions at the Colorado National Guard Joint Force Headquarters, in Centennial, Colorado, including as Chief of the Joint Staff. Sherman was the commander of the 169th Field Artillery Brigade from October 2017 to August 2019, and was chief of staff of the Colorado Army National Guard from August to December 2019.

Between October 2020 and August 2023, he was the Director of the Joint Staff, Colorado Army National Guard, and was also the Deputy Chief of Staff of the Army National Guard, Operations, from February 2022 to August 2023. The latter position is also simultaneously the Deputy Chief of Staff, Eighth United States Army, in South Korea. From August to September 2023 he was a special assistant to the Director of the Army National Guard, in Arlington, Virginia.

In September 2023, he became commander of Joint Task Force 51, which assists the civil authorities with homeland security and homeland defense operations, and also the deputy commanding general of United States Army North for support and the National Guard.

In August 2024, Sherman became acting commander of U.S. Army North, while it did not have a new commanding officer confirmed by the Senate. He remained in that role until December 2024, when Lt. Gen. Allan Pepin assumed command.

During the June 2025 Los Angeles protests, Sherman was placed in charge of the National Guard troops and Marines that were sent to Los Angeles, which fall under Task Force 51. Sherman relinquished command of Joint Task Force 51 to Brig. Gen. Jerry E. Biard on 10 April 2026, and retired from the military on 2 May 2026.

== Dates of promotion ==
Rank	Branch	Date
Second lieutenant	Army	30 May 1992
First lieutenant	Army	30 May 1994
Captain	Army	1 June 1996
Major	Army	22 November 2002
Lieutenant colonel	Army	1 April 2009
Colonel	Army	31 March 2014
Brigadier general	Army	20 March 2020
Major general	Army	26 August 2023

Military offices
Preceded by William Prendergast	Commander of Joint Task Force 51; 2023–2026	Succeeded by Jerry E. Biard
Position established	Deputy Commanding General, Support and National Guard, of the United States Army North; 2023–2026	Unit deactivated
Preceded by John R. Evans Jr.	Commander of the United States Army North; Acting; 2024	Succeeded by Allan Pepin
