= Combat Aviation Brigade, 3rd Infantry Division =

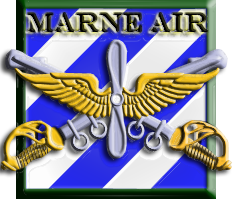
- Active: 1984–1991; 1996–present
- Country: United States
- Allegiance: United States Army
- Type: Aviation
- Size: Brigade
- Part of: 3rd Infantry Division
- Garrison/HQ: Hunter Army Airfield, Georgia
- Nickname: Falcons; Marne Air
- Colors: Blue & white
- Engagements: Iraq War; War in Afghanistan

Insignia
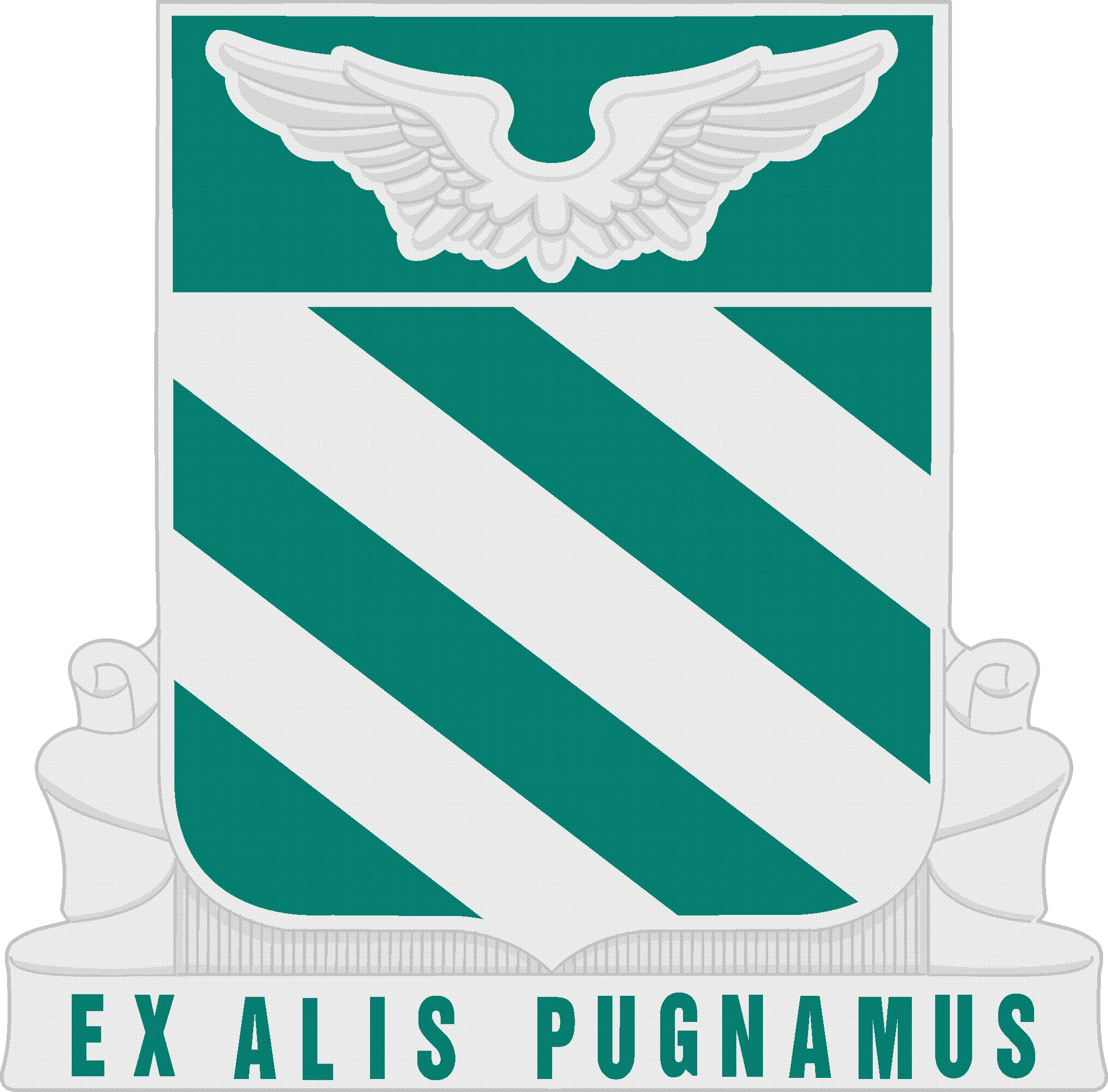
- Distinctive unit insignia

The Combat Aviation Brigade, 3rd Infantry Division is the Combat Aviation Brigade of the 3rd Infantry Division of the United States Army based at Fort Stewart.

== History ==
The original predecessor of the Combat Aviation Brigade, 3rd Infantry Division was the 3rd Aviation Company, activated and assigned to the 3rd Infantry Division on 1 July 1957 at Fort Benning, Georgia. Twenty-seven years later, on 16 November 1984, the CAB was provisionally activated as the U.S. Army’s first combat aviation brigade in a mechanized infantry division. The brigade was officially activated 15 March 1985 and designated the Aviation Brigade, 3rd Infantry Division and then inactivated on 16 August 1991. It was reactivated on 16 February 1996 at Fort Stewart, Georgia as part of the reflagging of the 24th Infantry Division (Mechanized) as the 3rd Infantry Division (Mechanized).

In February 1998 the Aviation Brigade, 3d Infantry Division deployed to Kuwait as part of the division's mission in support of Operation Desert Thunder. At the time the brigade was organized to provide the 3d Infantry Division with a maneuver brigade consisting of an attack helicopter battalion, a general support aviation battalion, and a cavalry squadron.

From September 2000 to October 2001, elements of the Aviation Brigade deployed to Bosnia-Herzegovina for Stabilisation Force (SFOR) 8 and SFOR 9 and enforcement of the Dayton Peace Accords. The Stabilization Force has a unified command and is NATO-led under the political direction and control of the Alliance's North Atlantic Council, as stipulated by the Peace Agreement.

Less than a year after 9/11, the Aviation Brigade deployed to Kuwait in support of OIF. On 20 March 2003, the brigade’s helicopters served as part of the 3d Infantry Division’s main effort on the March to Baghdad. During the battle at An Nasiriah, the brigade shaped the battlespace in order for 3d Brigade Combat Team, 3d Infantry Division to destroy enemy units near the Highway 1 Bridge and Tallil Airbase. After the fall of Baghdad, the brigade continued to play a vital role in the ongoing fight for the security of the city and the country.

In 2004, the unit was redesigned as the U.S. Army’s first modular combat aviation brigade (CAB). Soon thereafter, the brigade deployed to Iraq in January 2005 in support of Operation Iraqi Freedom III. The brigade significantly increased its ability to operate 24 hours a day for an indefinite period of time providing aviation combat power to the division. The brigade flew more than 80,000 hours in support of more than 26,000 combat missions.

In May 2007, as part of the "Surge", the CAB deployed to Iraq again, this time in support of Operation Iraqi Freedom V. During the Surge, the CAB was tasked with supporting the main mission of Multi-National Division-Center stopping the flow of accelerants into Baghdad. Over a 15-month deployment, the brigade completed more than 250 air assaults resulting in numerous arrests and captures of high-value targets and other enemy fighters, and executed 5,700 MEDEVAC missions supporting Coalition Forces, Iraqi Army and local nationals. The brigade accounted for 64% of the Multi-National Division-Center enemy killed in action and more than 80 wounded in action. The brigade also moved over 205,000 personnel and 21 million pounds of cargo around the battlefield.

The CAB returned to Hunter Army Airfield in August 2008, preparing for another deployment. Less than eight months after learning of the new mission in Afghanistan, the CAB, reorganized as Task Force Falcon, joined the surge into Afghanistan in November 2009. The arrival of the CAB marked a new chapter for the brigade and the 3d Infantry Division as the Combat Aviation Brigade was the first brigade-sized element from the Marne Division to serve in OEF X. Task Force Falcon flew in excess of 160,000 combat flight hours and provided much needed humanitarian relief efforts to both Afghanistan and Pakistan.

On 9 January 2013, Task Force Falcon assumed responsibility of US Army conventional rotary wing aviation operations across Regional Commands – South, Southwest, and West supporting U.S. conventional and special operations forces, International Security Assistance Forces, and Afghan National Security Forces. The task force provided continuous attack, reconnaissance and security, medical evacuation, personnel and cargo transport, downed aircraft recovery, and deliberate and hasty air assault capabilities in support of ground forces. Task Force Falcon provided flexibility and freedom of maneuver to enable ground forces to extend their security operations and assist Afghan National Security Forces with independent operations. Partnered missions proved essential in assisting Government of the Islamic Republic of Afghanistan to achieve its objective of providing independent security of the people of Afghanistan.

During Operations Enduring Freedom XIII, Task Force Falcon flew over 100,000 hours, averaging almost 12,000 hours per month during the height of the fighting season, and supported 625 deliberate operations, 2,000 MEDEVAC missions, and moved 4.9 million pounds of cargo and 15,000 personnel.

Task Force Falcon expanded the capabilities of previous units. MEDEVAC aircraft increased the use of critical blood transfusions during flight and added back wall medics and emergency critical care nurses to enable life saving operations. The task force completed the largest forward operating base closure in Regional Command – South during OEF XIII – Forward Operating Base Wolverine – ahead of schedule, while providing continued aviation support in Zabul Province. In April, when a sudden hailstorm grounded 84 helicopters on Kandahar, the task force repaired all damaged aircraft within 3 weeks without a gap in air support to teammates on the ground. During this deployment, the unit lost seven soldiers.

In October 2017, half of the brigade deployed to Afghanistan as Task Force Falcon, replacing the 16th Combat Aviation Brigade of the 7th Infantry Division. In November 2019, the brigade took over responsibility as the rotational combat aviation brigade of Operation Atlantic Resolve in Germany from the Combat Aviation Brigade, 1st Infantry Division. The brigade returned to Fort Stewart after the conclusion of the nine-month rotation in July 2020, being replaced by the Combat Aviation Brigade, 101st Airborne Division.

== Units ==
DUI	Unit	Nickname	Type of Aircraft
	Headquarters and Headquarters Company	Talons	No Aircraft Assigned
	1st Battalion, 3rd Aviation Regiment	Vipers	AH-64E
	2nd Battalion, 3rd Aviation Regiment	Knighthawks	UH-60M, HH-60M, CH-47
	4th Battalion, 3rd Aviation Regiment	Brawlers	UH-60M
	603rd Aviation Support Battalion (603rd ASB)	Workhorse	No Aircraft Assigned
