= Kevin Leahy (general) =

United States Army general

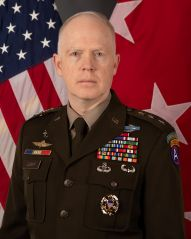
- Military career
- Allegiance: United States
- Branch: United States Army
- Service years: 1989–present
- Rank: Lieutenant General
- Commands: United States Army Central; Combined Joint Task Force – Operation Inherent Resolve; Special Operations Command Central; 5th Special Forces Group
- Conflicts: War against the Islamic State; Operation Inherent Resolve; 2026 Iran war

Kevin C. Leahy is an American lieutenant general who has commanded the United States Army Central since 2026. He was previously acting deputy commander of the United States Central Command from 2025 to 2026, and commander of Combined Joint Task Force – Operation Inherent Resolve from 2024 to 2025.

== Early life and education ==
A native of Oakland, New Jersey, Leahy began serving in the United States Army Reserve in December 1989, and obtained a Bachelor of Arts degree in Criminal Justice from the University of Scranton in Scranton, Pennsylvania in 1993.

== Military career ==
Leahy was commissioned from the University of Scranton's Army Reserve Officers' Training Corps in May 1993 as a Military Police officer. In 1998 he completed Special Forces Assessment and Selection and was assigned to 5th Special Forces Group. He served at multiple levels of command within the group, including at the ODA team, company, and battalion level, and completed several deployments in the United States Central Command area of operations. Leahy commanded the 5th Special Forces Group from 16 July 2015 to 2017. He then served as director of the Commander's Action Group, United States Special Operations Command, and in October 2018 was assigned as deputy commander of Special Operations Command Central.

He later served as deputy commanding general (operations) of 7th Infantry Division at Joint Base Lewis McChord, Washington, deputy director for strategy, plans, and policy on the Joint Staff, commander of Special Operations Command Africa Forward – Central Africa in Uganda, and commander of Special Operations Command Central at MacDill Air Force Base, Florida.

He took command of Combined Joint Task Force – Operation Inherent Resolve, the U.S. military's mission against the Islamic State, on 5 August 2024. He relinquished command of CJTF–OIR on 21 July 2025, having been nominated to command United States Army Central and Third Army. Leahy later became acting deputy director of U.S. Central Command. He was also concurrently the deputy commander for the Iran war after it began on 28 February 2026. Leahy took command of United States Army Central on 4 June 2026.

== Personal life ==
He is married to Tracy, and they have four children.

Military offices
Preceded by John W. Brennan	Commander of the 5th Special Forces Group; 2015–2017	Succeeded by Lewis Jay Powers
Preceded by Joel B. Vowell	Commander of the Combined Joint Task Force – Operation Inherent Resolve; 2024–2025	Succeeded by Kevin J. Lambert
Preceded by Sean Salene; Acting	Deputy Commander of the United States Central Command; Acting; 2025–2026	Succeeded by Patrick Frank
Preceded by Patrick Frank	Commander of the United States Army Central; 2026–present	Incumbent
