= Joint Task Force 51 =

US Army command post

Emblem for U.S. Army North, the parent unit of JTF 51

Joint Task Force 51 (JTF-51) is a contingency command post under United States Army North (USARNORTH), responsible for coordinating Defense Support of Civil Authorities (DSCA) within the United States. JTF-51 is headquartered at Joint Base San Antonio-Fort Sam Houston, Texas, and operates under the authority of United States Northern Command (USNORTHCOM). The task force is designed to provide rapid-response command and control capabilities for federal military support to civilian agencies during natural disasters, emergencies, and homeland security operations. Brig. Gen. Jerry E. Baird, Jr. assumed command of Joint Task Force 51 on April 10, 2026, succeeding Major General Scott M. Sherman who assumed command of Joint Task Force 51 on September 29, 2024, succeeding Maj. Gen. William J. Prendergast.

== History ==
JTF-51 was established to enable USARNORTH to quickly deploy a scalable, joint command post in response to requests for federal assistance from state or federal agencies following disasters or emergencies. The task force was first operationally tested in the mid-2000s, with its mission and structure evolving in response to major incidents such as Hurricane Katrina, though the primary joint military response at that time was organized under Joint Task Force Katrina. Since then, JTF-51 has played a significant role in disaster relief operations, including response efforts during hurricanes Harvey, Irma, and Maria, as well as the COVID-19 pandemic.

=== COVID-19 Pandemic Response ===
During the COVID-19 pandemic, JTF-51 deployed to California and the Navajo Nation to provide command and control for military medical personnel, supporting civilian healthcare providers and coordinating the arrival of Army, Air Force, and Navy rapid response teams. The task force managed the integration and sustainment of military medical teams across several states, ensuring effective support for overwhelmed healthcare systems.

=== 2025 Los Angeles Deployment ===
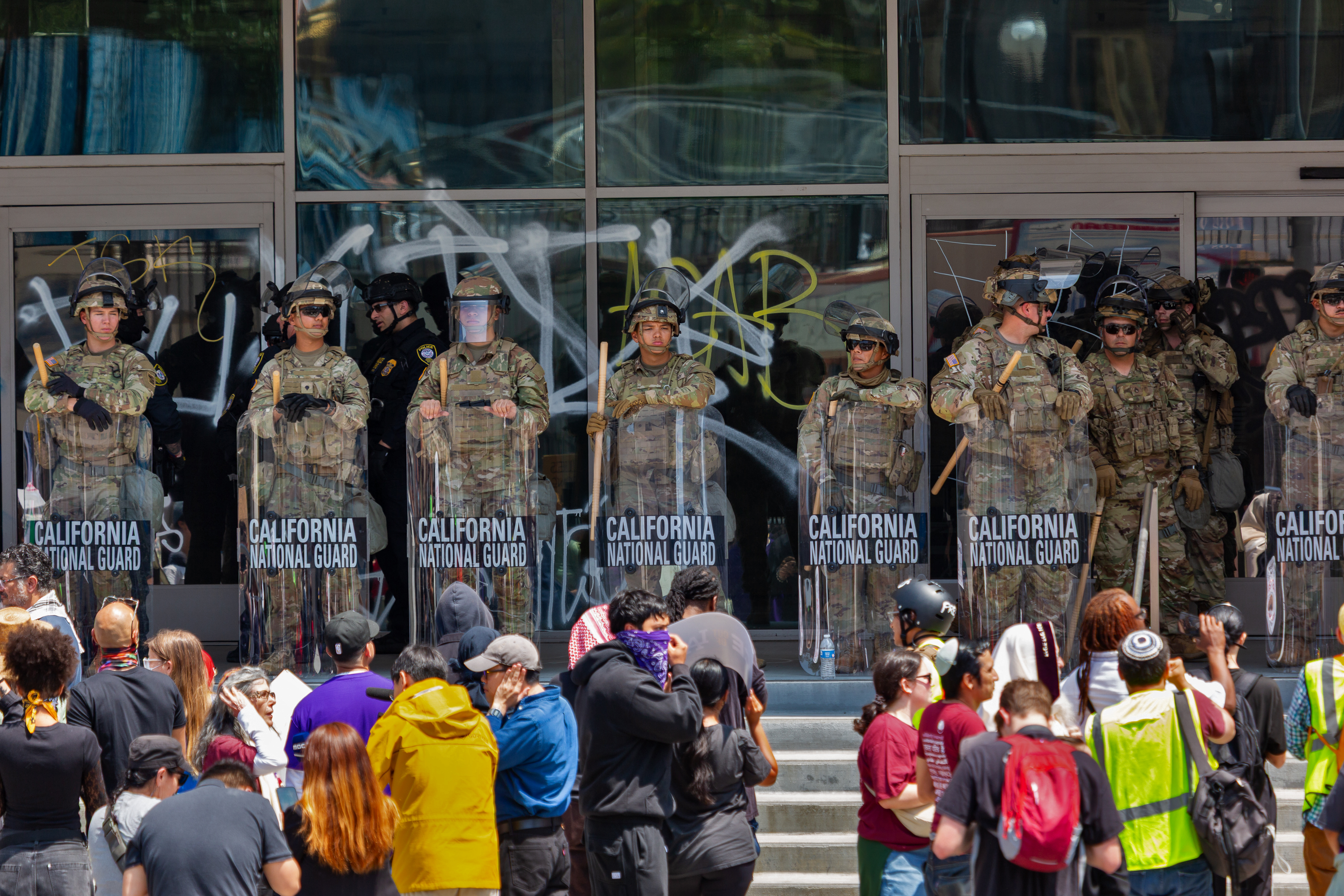
California National Guard and protestors in Los Angeles, June 2025

In response to the June 2025 Los Angeles protests, JTF-51 was activated under USNORTHCOM to coordinate the deployment of federal military forces to Los Angeles County. The operation involved federalized National Guardsmen and U.S. Marines, tasked with protecting federal personnel and property during protests related to immigration enforcement actions. The National Guard troops, federalized under Title 10 authority, were deployed primarily for force protection and were not authorized to conduct law enforcement operations such as arrests or searches. Marines received specialized training in crowd control and de-escalation tactics prior to deployment.

U.S. military forces under JTF-51 deployed to Los Angeles County currently include:

- 2,100 soldiers of the 79th Infantry Brigade Combat Team, California National Guard under Title 10 status
- 700 Marines from 2nd Battalion, 7th Marines, 1st Marine Division

Approximately 2,000 other California National Guardsman have been placed under Title 10 status, but have not been deployed to Los Angeles County.

On June 18, roughly 500 California National Guard soldiers attached to Task Force 51 were deployed to assist multiple federal law enforcement agencies in raids on a large marijuana growth operation 130 miles from Los Angeles in the eastern Coachella Valley. A NORTHCOM spokesperson stated that the "catalyst of this order was related to events occurring in Los Angeles; however, the president's order and NORTHCOM's mission is not constrained by the geography of Southern California".

On July 7, roughly 90 Guardsmen joined several federal agencies in a "show of force" at a largely empty MacArthur Park in Los Angeles for an hour before leaving. Defense officials stated it was not a military operation, but acknowledged the size and scope could make it look like one to the public.

On December 10, California-based federal judge Charles B. Breyer issued a ruling ordering the National Guard deployment in Los Angeles to end.

On December 31, Trump announced that the National Guard deployment to Los Angeles and other cities were over following a Supreme Court ruling against the administration's deployments.

== Organization and mission ==
JTF-51 operates under U.S. Northern Command (USNORTHCOM) and serves as an initial entry coordinating element. When Army North as a titled headquarters retired, that mission, that responsibility of nation protection went under the United States Army Western Hemisphere Command. The commander of Task Force 51 new title is deputy commanding general for the homeland in the western hemisphere as well as commander JTF-51.

== 2025 legal challenges ==
The 2025 deployment of JTF-51 to Los Angeles sparked protests and legal challenges, with California officials, including Governor Gavin Newsom, opposing the federalization of the National Guard and filing lawsuits to challenge the federal government's authority to deploy troops without state coordination. While JTF-51 troops were authorized to temporarily detain individuals for force protection, they were not permitted to make arrests or enforce immigration laws directly. The deployment and its legal implications became a subject of public and policy debate.

After a three-day bench trial, Breyer ruled on September 2, 2025, that the Trump administration had violated the Posse Comitatus Act and ordered the administration not to use National Guard or military troops for civilian law enforcement in California, writing:

"Task Force 51 was expressly instructed that it could engage in certain law enforcement activities: setting up protective perimeters, traffic blockades, crowd control, and the like. That instruction was incorrect. There is no exception to the Posse Comitatus Act for such conduct. (…) The record is replete with evidence that Task Force 51 executed domestic law in these prohibited ways".

Breyer further described the administration's actions and rhetoric of further domestic military deployments as an apparent attempt at "creating a national police force with the President as its chief" and described the rationale for deployment as contrived, writing that "There was no rebellion, nor was civilian law enforcement unable to respond to the protests and enforce the law". Breyer issued an injunction covering all of California, blocking the use of the National Guard, though stayed the injunction until September 12 to give time for the government to appeal.
