= Philip J. Ryan =

United States Army general

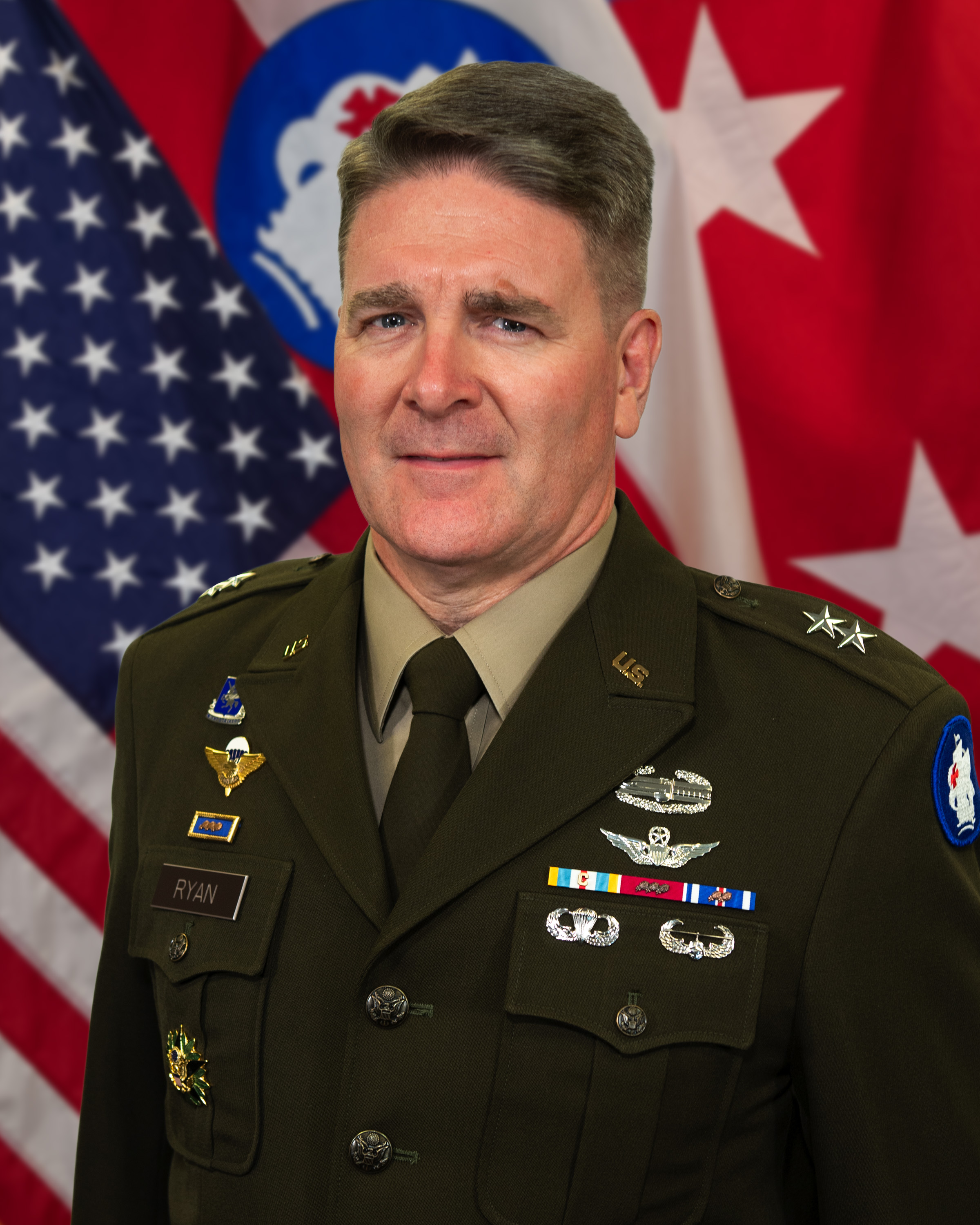
- Major General Philip J. Ryan
- Alma mater: West Point; Webster University; Army War College
- Spouse: Jennifer Ryan
- Children: 3
- Military career
- Branch: United States Army
- Rank: Major General
- Commands: United States Army Special Operations Aviation Command (USASOAC); Combined Special Operations Joint Task Force – Levant (CSOJTF-L); U.S. Army South (ARSOUTH); 2nd Battalion, 160th Special Operations Aviation Regiment

Philip John Ryan is a United States Army major general who served is the deputy commander for U.S. Army Western Hemisphere Command.

== Biography ==
Ryan graduated from West Point in 1992 and as a junior officer he served as an AH-6 Little Bird pilot in the 160th Special Operations Aviation Regiment (SOAR), 101st Airborne Division (Air Assault) and the 2nd Infantry Division.

As a staff officer, he served at the Army Human Resources Command as the Chief of the Special Management Division, the United States Army Special Operations Command, and as the deputy director for Army Aviation.

As a general officer, he has commanded the United States Army Special Operations Aviation Command (June 2020-January 2023), the Deputy Commanding General-Futures, United States Special Operations Command (January 2023-May 2023), the Special Operations Joint Task Force-Levant (June 2023-June 2024) and United States Army South (June 2024 – May 2026). He is currently the deputy commander for U.S. Army Western Hemisphere Command.

MG Ryan's decorations include the Defense Superior Service Medal, Legion of Merit, Distinguished Flying Cross, Defense Meritorious Service Medal, Meritorious Service Medal, Air Medal, Joint Service Commendation Medal, Army Commendation Medal, Joint Service Achievement Medal, Army Achievement Medal, National Defense Service Medal, Armed Forces Expeditionary Medal, Afghanistan Campaign Medal, Inherent Resolve Campaign Medal, Global War on Terrorism Expeditionary Medal, Global War on Terrorism Service Medal, Armed Forces Service Medal, Military Outstanding Volunteer Service Medal, Army Service Ribbon and the Overseas Service Ribbon.
