= List of commanders of 101st Airborne Division =

Shoulder sleeve insignia of the US 101st Airborne Division.

This is a list of commanders of the US 101st Airborne Division of the United States Army

- BG Roy Hoffman July 1918 – December 1918
- Sixth Corps Area commander September 1921 - August 1942
- MG William C. Lee August 1942 – February 1944
- BG Don F. Pratt February 1944 – March 1944
- MG Maxwell D. Taylor March 1944 – August 1945
- BG Anthony C. McAuliffe December 1944 – December 1944
- BG William N. Gillmore August 1945 – September 1945
- BG Gerald St. C. Mickle September 1945 – October 1945
- BG Stuart Cutler October 1945 – November 1945
- MG William R. Schmidt July 1948 – May 1949
- MG Cornelius E. Ryan August 1950 – May 1951
- MG Ray E. Porter May 1951 – May 1953
- MG Paul DeWitt Adams May 1953 – December 1953
- MG Riley F. Ennis May 1954 – October 1955
- MG Frank S. Bowen October 1955 – March 1956
- MG Thomas L. Sherburne Jr. May 1956 – March 1958
- MG William C. Westmoreland April 1958 – June 1960
- MG Ben Harrell June 1960 – July 1961
- MG Charles W. G. Rich July 1961 – February 1963
- MG Harry H. Critz February 1963 – March 1964
- MG Beverly E. Powell March 1964 – March 1966
- MG Ben Sternberg March 1966 – July 1967
- MG Olinto M. Barsanti July 1967 – July 1968
- MG Melvin Zais July 1968 – May 1969
- MG John M. Wright May 1969 – May 1970
- MG John J. Hennessey May 1970 – February 1971
- MG Thomas M. Tarpley February 1971 – April 1972
- MG John H. Cushman April 1972 – August 1973
- MG Sidney Bryan Berry August 1973 – July 1974
- MG John W. McEnery August 1974 – February 1976
- MG John A. Wickham Jr. March 1976 – March 1978
- MG John N. Brandenburg March 1978 – June 1980
- MG Jack V. Mackmull June 1980 – August 1981
- MG Charles W. Bagnal August 1981 – August 1983
- MG James E. Thompson Jr. August 1983 – June 1985
- MG Burton D. Patrick June 1985 – May 1987
- MG Teddy G. Allen May 1987 – August 1989
- MG J. H. Binford Peay III August 1989 – June 1991
- MG John E. Miller June 1991 - July 1993
- MG John M. Keane July 1993 – March 1995
- MG William F. "Buck" Kernan November 1996 – February 1998
- MG Robert T. Clark February 1998 – June 2000
- MG Richard A. Cody June 2000 – July 2002
- MG David H. Petraeus July 2002 – May 2004
- MG Thomas R. Turner II May 2004 – November 2006
- MG Jeffrey J. Schloesser November 2006 – July 2009
- MG John F. Campbell July 2009 – August 2011
- MG James C. McConville August 2011 – June 2014
- MG Gary J. Volesky June 2014 – January 2017
- MG Andrew P. Poppas January 2017 – February 2019
- MG Brian E. Winski February 2019 – March 2021
- MG Joseph P. McGee March 2021 – July 2023
- MG Brett Sylvia July 2023 – May 2025
- MG David Gardner May 2025 – present
