= Jack Keane =

American political commentator and general (born 1943)

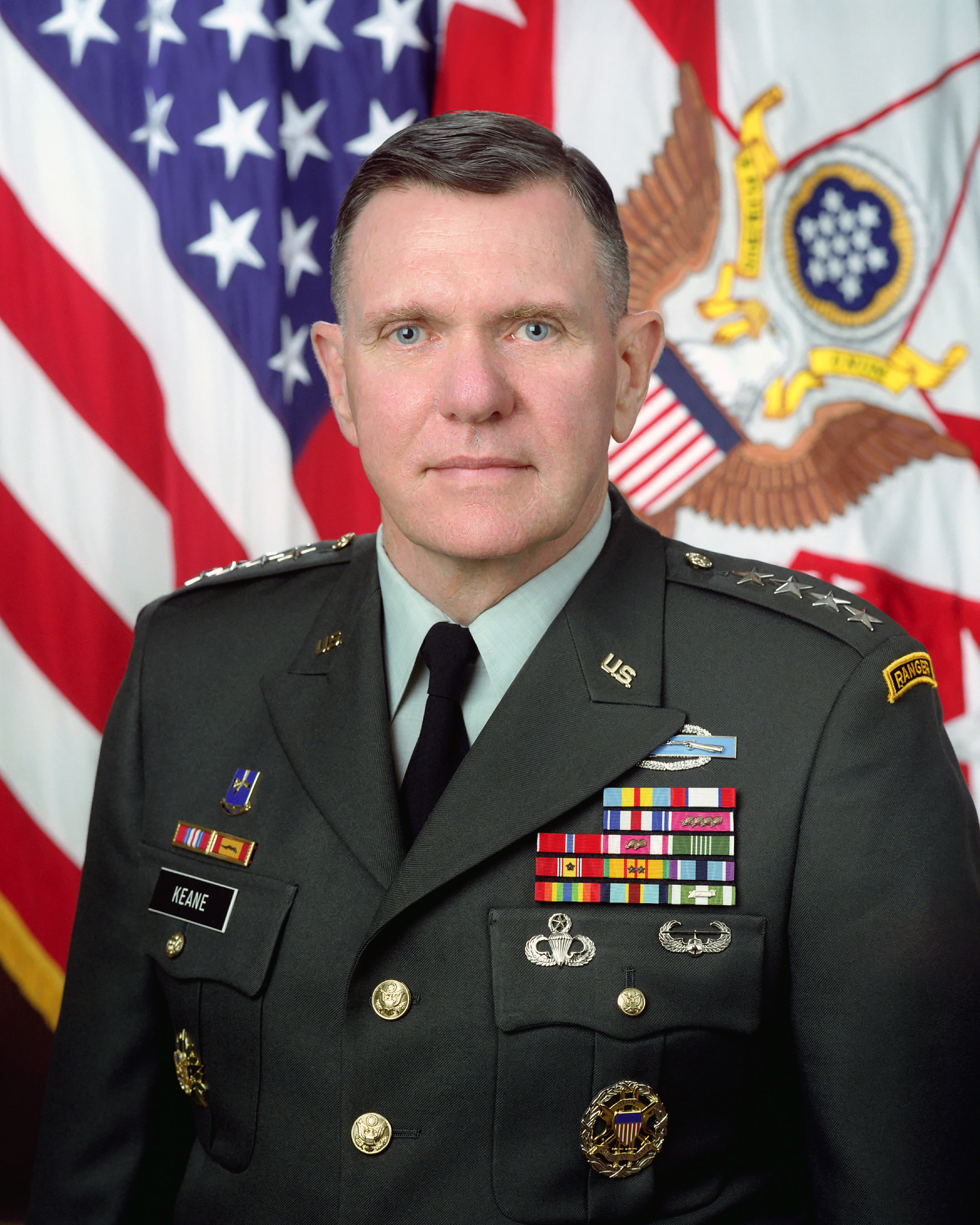
- Official portrait, 1999
- Born: 1 February 1943 (age 83); New York City, New York, U.S.
- Education: Fordham University (BS); Western Kentucky University (MA)
- Military career
- Allegiance: United States
- Branch: United States Army
- Service years: 1966–2003
- Rank: General
- Commands: Vice Chief of Staff of the United States Army; XVIII Airborne Corps; 101st Airborne Division; 1st Brigade, 10th Mountain Division
- Conflicts: Vietnam War; Somali Civil War; Operation Uphold Democracy; Bosnian War; Kosovo War; War in Afghanistan; Iraq War
- Awards: Presidential Medal of Freedom; Defense Distinguished Service Medal (2); Army Distinguished Service Medal (2); Silver Star; Legion of Merit (5); Bronze Star Medal
- Website: Official website

John M. Keane (born 1 February 1943) is an American political commentator and retired general who served as the 29th vice chief of staff of the United States Army from 1999 to 2003. He was also the acting chief of staff of the Army in 2003. He is a national security analyst, primarily on Fox News, chairman of the Institute for the Study of War, and chairman of AM General.

Born and raised in New York City, he received his commission as an Infantry officer when he graduated from Fordham University's Army Reserve Officers' Training Corps in 1966. He became a decorated combat veteran of the Vietnam War, where he served as a platoon and company leader. His commands later included the 1st Brigade, 10th Mountain Division; the Joint Readiness Training Center; the 101st Airborne Division; and the XVIII Airborne Corps. He also served as the deputy commander of the U.S. Atlantic Command from 1998 to 1999. Units under his command were deployed to Somalia, Haiti, Bosnia, and Kosovo; and as the vice chief and acting chief of staff he provided oversight for the wars in Iraq and Afghanistan.

Since his retirement from the United States Army, Keane has been a commentator and informal government advisor. He had an advisory role during the U.S. occupation of Iraq. An article co-authored by Keane inspired President George W. Bush to undertake the Iraq War troop surge of 2007, and he later advised Bush, Vice President Dick Cheney, and General David Petraeus in its implementation. He has also advised President Donald Trump on foreign policy.

== Early life and education ==
John M. "Jack" Keane was born in Manhattan, New York City, and grew up in the Lower East Side of Manhattan. His father served in the United States Marine Corps and fought in the Pacific theatre of World War II. He is the son of Elizabeth (née Davis) and John Keane. He has a brother, Ronald.

Keane attended Bishop Dubois High School and Fordham University, where he participated in the Pershing Rifles. He graduated with a Bachelor of Science degree in accounting in 1966 after studying at the university's Gabelli School of Business, and received his commission as an Infantry officer via the Army Reserve Officers' Training Corps program. He then attended Western Kentucky University and graduated with an Master of Arts degree in philosophy. He later graduated from the US Army Command and General Staff College and the US Army War College.

== Army career ==
After receiving his commission as a second lieutenant of the U.S. Army in 1966, his first assignment was at Fort Bragg with the XVIII Airborne Corps. Keane served in the Vietnam War as a Ranger paratrooper, leading in combat as a platoon leader and company commander. He earned the Combat Infantry Badge, the Master Parachutist Badge, and the Silver Star for gallantry while deployed in the Republic of Vietnam. Keane was later promoted to colonel on 28 June 1984, and his commands included the 1st Brigade, 10th Mountain Division.

He was promoted to brigadier general on 27 April 1990 and then served as the commander of the Joint Readiness Training Center. In 1991 Keane saved the life of David Petraeus during a live-fire exercise. According to Keane, Petraeus was shot "accidentally, standing right next to me, and I had to fight to save his life. He had a hole about the size of a quarter in his back and is gushing with blood, and we stopped the bleeding and got him on a helicopter and got him to a surgeon and so we were sort of bonded ever since that time."

Keane was promoted to major general on 6 August 1993, and then commanded the 101st Airborne Division. He was promoted to lieutenant general on 1 February 1996 and served as the commander of the XVIII Airborne Corps until March 1998, when he became Deputy Commander-in-Chief of the United States Atlantic Command. During the 1990s, units under his command operated in Somalia, Haiti, Bosnia, and Kosovo.

=== Vice chief and acting chief ===
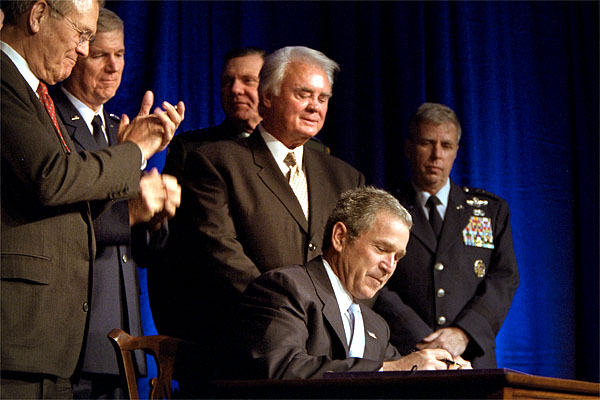
Keane watches as President George W. Bush signs a defense appropriations bill on 10 January 2002

He was nominated for promotion to general and assignment as the vice chief of staff of the Army in June 1999. He was confirmed on 26 June 1999, and served as the vice chief while Eric Shinseki was the chief. Keane and Shinseki developed a plan for the Army to deploy forces to any combat theater in the world within 96 hours, after previous criticism of the Army among some for being too reluctant to become involved in the Bosnian and Kosovo wars, and began transforming heavy armor units into lighter brigades.

Keane was at the Pentagon during the 9/11 attacks, and later provided oversight and support for the wars in Iraq and Afghanistan. He was the first senior military officer to visit the troops on the ground in the Middle East. He also made frequent media appearances and speeches, and maintained the Army's relationships with Congress, the press, and the public. According to Keane, the Army leadership did not recognize that they were dealing with an insurgency in Iraq until the summer of 2003, when looting and violence against U.S. forces escalated. Prior to that, among Keane and others who had planned the invasion of Iraq, "one of the things that happened to us … is many of us got seduced by the Iraqi exiles in terms of what the outcome would be."

As early as April 2002, Donald Rumsfeld named Keane as his preferred to choice to become the next chief of staff of the Army. He was under consideration for the role in 2003, but declined the appointment for family reasons. Keane was the acting chief of staff from 11 June to 1 August 2003, between the retirement of Eric Shinseki and the confirmation of Peter Schoomaker, before he retired on 16 October 2003.

== Later career ==
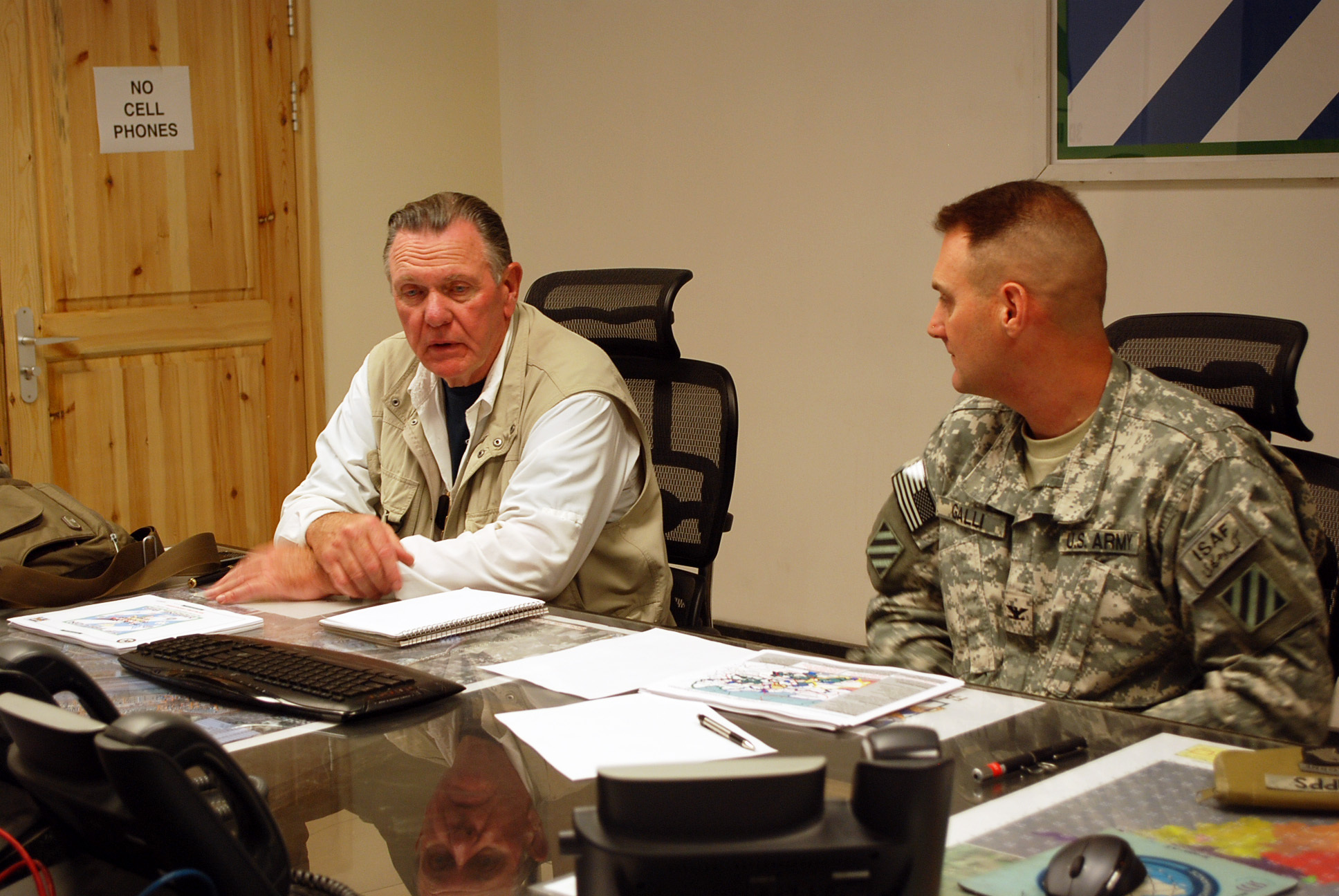
Keane (left) meeting with an army colonel in 2010

After his retirement, he has served as an informal advisor to presidents and other senior officials. He served an advisory role in the management of the US occupation of Iraq, as a member of the Defense Policy Board Advisory Committee. In January 2007, Keane and the scholar Frederick W. Kagan released a policy paper, "Choosing Victory: A Plan for Success in Iraq," through the American Enterprise Institute that called for bringing security by putting 30,000 additional American troops there for at least 18 months. In part convinced by this paper, President George W. Bush ordered on 10 January 2007, the deployment of 21,500 additional troops to Iraq, most of whom would be deployed to Baghdad. The deployment has been nicknamed the 2007 "surge".

Debate was intense over how long the surge should last. Keane supported a longer buildup of at least one year. The surge was supposed to support the Iraqi Security Forces until they could assume responsibility for country security. The National Intelligence Estimate supported the longer timeframe, noting that there were problems with the independence of the Iraqi police from sectarian militias and death squads. Keane supported the view that distribution of economic assistance would have a more significant impact over a longer deployment because "with the short term surge...the enemy can wait you out."

Of his initial meeting with President Bush regarding the surge, Keane said that he made a phone call to Newt Gingrich to ask his advice prior to the meeting. As Keane said in 2014,

Gingrich gave me some good advice. He said, "Look, Jack. Most people go in the Oval Office, even people who go in there a lot, have a tendency in front of the President of the United States to always leave something on the table." He said, "Don't leave anything on the table." He said, "You're going to get about 15 minutes at best and put it all out there. And when you walk out of that room, feel good that you got it all out there." So that was sound advice, and I did put it all out there.

Keane advised Bush, Vice President Dick Cheney, and General David Petreaus on the surge. Keane was asked by Vice President Cheney to go back on active duty and to lead the surge in the field. When Keane declined, Cheney pressed him to come work in the White House and oversee both the wars in Afghanistan and Iraq; Keane again declined. Keane ended up briefly working at the White House and then later traveled to Iraq several times to advise General Petraeus.

=== Current activities ===
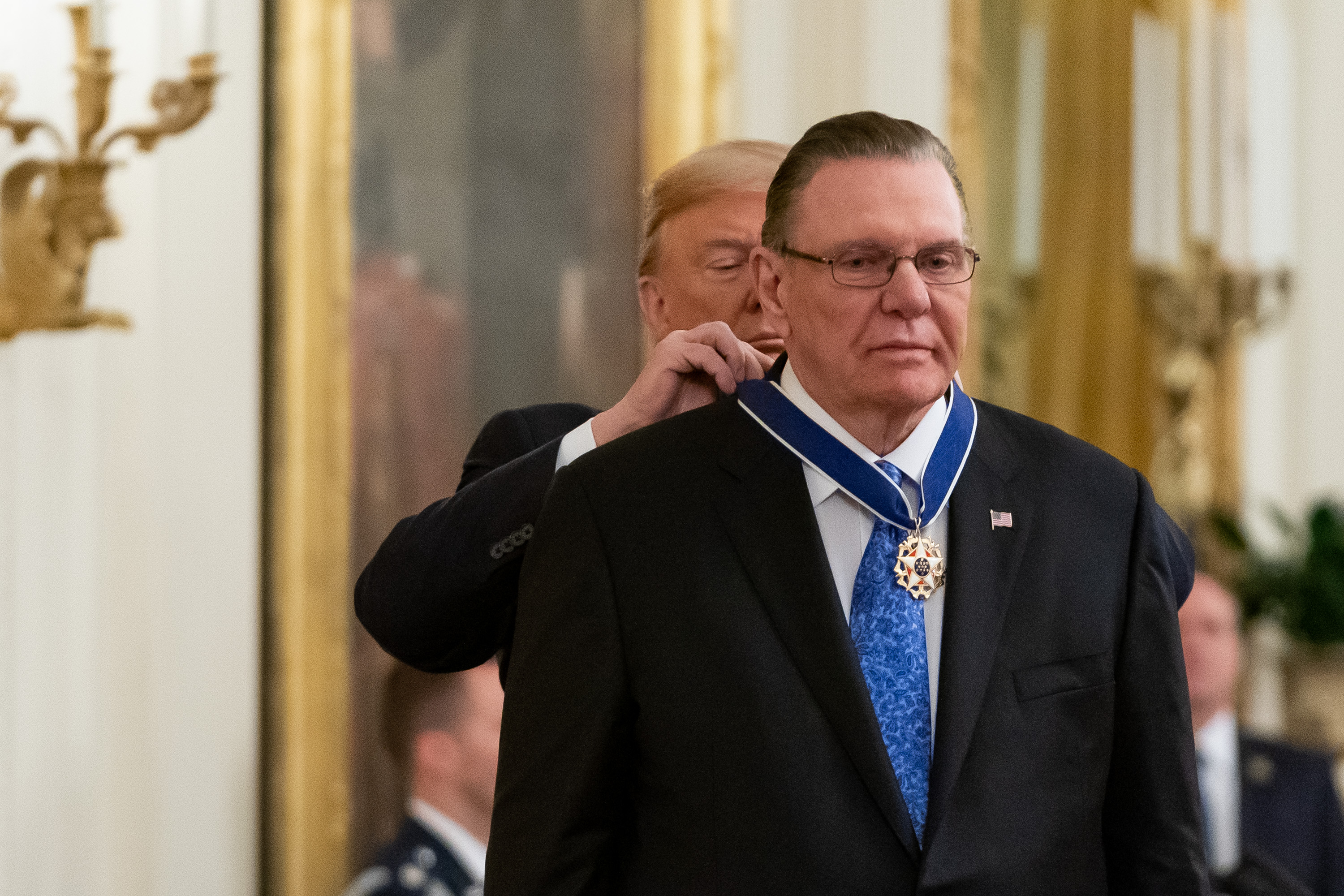
Keane receives the Presidential Medal of Freedom from US President Donald Trump on 10 March 2020

Keane is a regular contributor to Fox News and is involved in a variety of business, think tank and charitable activities. He is chairman of AM General, the firm that produces the Humvee. In June 2016, Keane co-founded IP3 International (IP3), a nuclear energy consulting firm.

Keane is an advisor to the Spirit of America, a 501(c)(3) organization. He was a strategic advisor for Academi and was a director of defense giant General Dynamics.

Keane is considered an influential voice to leaders from both major political parties, including Hillary Clinton and Donald Trump, particularly on foreign policy issues related to the Middle East. Trump watched Keane on Fox News for years, and referred to him as "my No. 1 guy." In November 2016, shortly after Stanley McChrystal declined the post of United States secretary of defense, Keane was offered it, but also declined, citing the death of his wife several months earlier. After Defense Secretary Jim Mattis resigned in December 2018, Trump again offered the job to Keane, who again declined.

He is a member of the Defense Policy Board Advisory Committee.

=== IP3 ===
Keane is a cofounder and director of IP3 International. According to a staff report to the chairman of the House Oversight Committee, during the 2016 US presidential campaign of Donald Trump and subsequently, Trump aides such as Jared Kushner and others have been engaged in promoting IP3's plan to transfer nuclear technology from the US to Saudi Arabia. According to the report, IP3 founders and others have been seeking to broker a deal with Riyadh without the "gold standard," a provision—tied to Section 123 of the 1954 Atomic Energy Act, which establishes conditions for nuclear cooperation between the US and its allies, that seeks to limit weaponizing of nuclear energy. In July 2019, the committee chairman released a second staff report that detailed various activities and contacts between IP3 and the Trump administration. A letter to Saudi Crown Prince Mohammed bin Salman (MBS) that was signed by General Keane and executives of IP3, boasted, “The agreements by President Trump and Mohammed bin Salman have established the framework for our unique opportunity to take the next steps with IP3 and the Kingdom of Saudi Arabia."

== Awards and decorations ==
Military awards that Keane has received include two Defense Distinguished Service Medals, two Army Distinguished Service Medals, the Silver Star, five awards of the Legion of Merit, the Bronze Star Medal, three Meritorious Service Medals, one Army Commendation Medal, the Joint Chiefs Service Badge, the Humanitarian Service Medal, Ranger Tab, the Combat Infantryman Badge, the Master Parachutist Badge, and the Air Assault Badge.

President Donald Trump awarded Keane the Presidential Medal of Freedom on 10 March 2020.

Keane's civilian awards include the Fordham University Distinguished Alumni Award, the USO 2002 Man of the Year award, and the Association of the United States Army 2001 Man of the Year award. Keane was awarded honorary doctorates from Fordham University and Eastern Kentucky University.

Combat Infantryman Badge
Master Parachutist Badge
Air Assault Badge
Ranger Tab
Joint Chiefs Service Badge
United States Army Staff Identification Badge
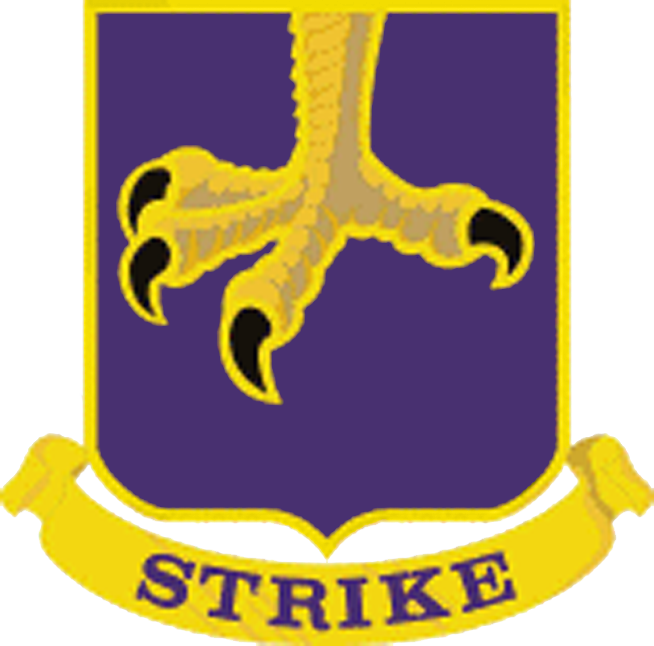
502nd Infantry Regimental Affiliation
Defense Distinguished Service Medal with one Oak Leaf Cluster
Army Distinguished Service Medal with one Oak Leaf Cluster
Silver Star
Legion of Merit with four Oak Leaf Clusters
Bronze Star Medal
Meritorious Service Medals with two Oak Leaf Clusters
Army Commendation Medal
Presidential Medal of Freedom
National Defense Service Medal with two Service Stars
Vietnam Service Medal with two Service Stars
Humanitarian Service Medal
Army Service Ribbon
Army Overseas Service Ribbon
Vietnam Campaign Medal
Valorous Unit Award
Vietnam Gallantry Cross Unit Citation

== Dates of promotion ==
Rank	Branch	Date
Second lieutenant	Army	1966
Colonel	Army	28 June 1984
Brigadier general	Army	27 April 1990
Major general	Army	6 August 1993
Lieutenant general	Army	1 February 1996
General	Army	26 June 1999

== Personal life ==
Keane married his first wife, Theresa Doyle, in 1965, and has two sons. She died in 2016 after having Parkinson's disease for 14 years. He is married to Angela McGlowan.

Military offices
Preceded by John Miller	Commander of the 101st Airborne Division; 1993–1996	Succeeded by William F. Kernan
Preceded by Hugh Shelton	Commanding General of the XVIII Airborne Corps; 1996–1998	Succeeded by William F. Kernan
Preceded by Eric Shinseki	Vice Chief of Staff of the United States Army; 1999–2003	Succeeded by George W. Casey Jr.
Preceded by Eric Shinseki	Chief of Staff of the United States Army; Acting; 2003	Succeeded by Peter Schoomaker
