= Andrew Poppas =

United States Army general (born c. 1966)

Andrew P. Poppas
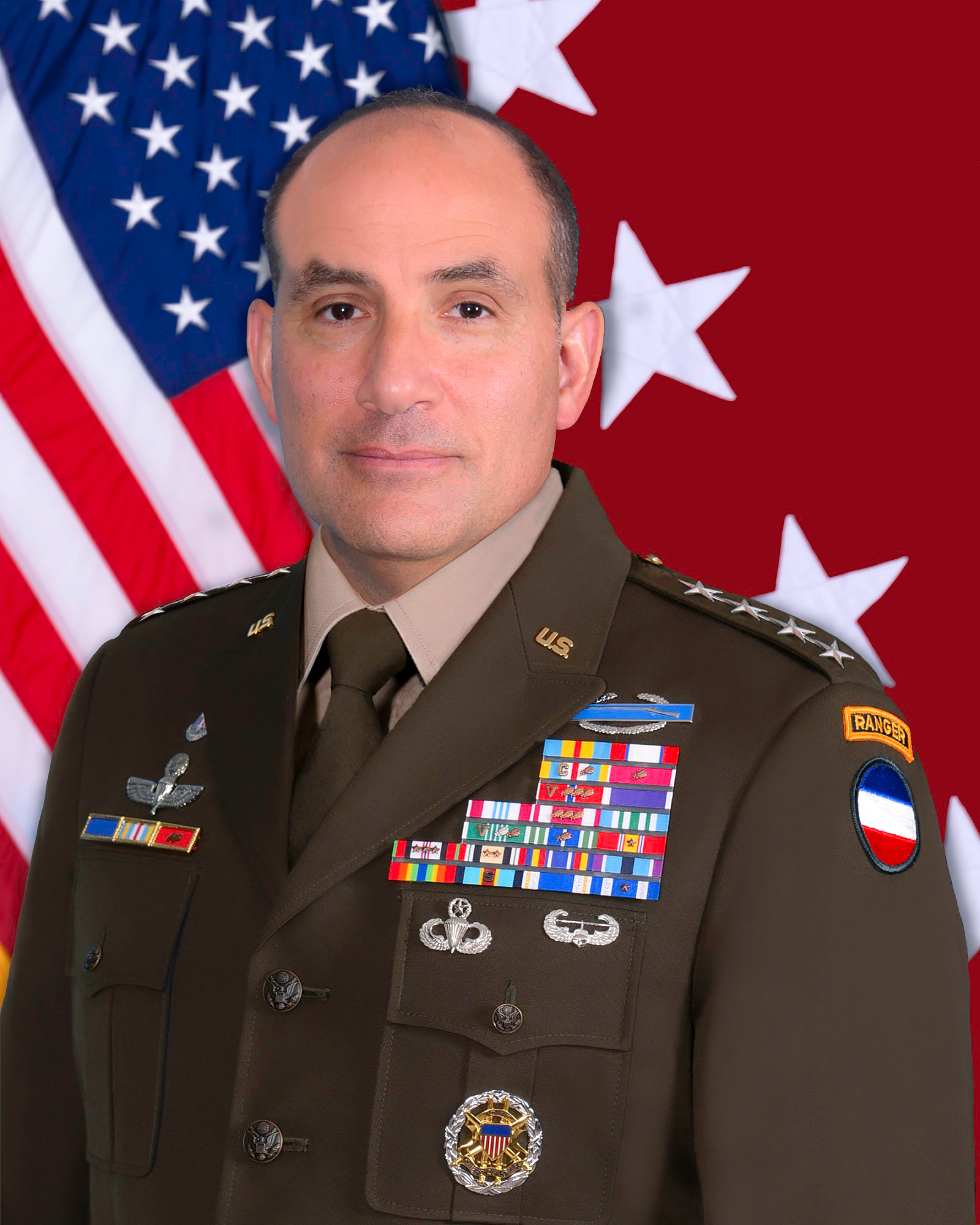
- Official portrait, 2022
- Born: 1965 or 1966 (age 59–60); Janesville, Wisconsin, U.S.
- Education: United States Military Academy (BS); Kansas State University (MS)
- Military career
- Allegiance: United States
- Branch: United States Army
- Service years: 1988–2025
- Rank: General
- Commands: United States Army Forces Command; Director of the Joint Staff; 101st Airborne Division; 1st Brigade Combat Team
- Conflicts: War in Afghanistan; Iraq War
- Awards: Army Distinguished Service Medal; Defense Superior Service Medal (2); Legion of Merit (3); Bronze Star Medal (4); Purple Heart

Andrew Peter Poppas (born 1965 or 1966) is a retired United States Army general who last served as the commanding general of the United States Army Forces Command from July 8, 2022 to December 5, 2025. He previously served as the director of the Joint Staff from 2020 to 2022. As director, he assisted the chairman of the Joint Chiefs of Staff in managing the Joint Staff, and assisted with the management and organization of the staff's members. He previously served as the director of operations of the Joint Staff, where he served as the principal assistant to the chairman of the Joint Chiefs of Staff for global integration initiatives and current and future operations. He also served as the commanding general of the 101st Airborne Division.

== Early life and education ==
Andrew Peter Poppas was born in 1965 or 1966 in Janesville, Wisconsin. He is an American of Greek descent. His father, George Poppas, was involved with the Greek resistance movement during World War II. Following the end of the war, he immigrated from Greece to the United States in 1946. After becoming an American citizen, he then served in the U.S. Army in the Korean War.

Poppas holds a Bachelor of Science in National Security Affairs from the United States Military Academy, a Master of Science in Occupational Education from Kansas State University, and is a graduate of the Defense Language Institute, the United States Army Command and General Staff College, the Senior Service College Fellowship at Harvard University and the Joint and Combined Warfighting School.

== Military career ==
Poppas was commissioned from the United States Military Academy in 1988 as a second lieutenant. His early career included time with the 3rd Infantry Regiment at Fort Myer, Virginia, as a rifle platoon leader, executive officer, and assistant operations officer; the 82nd Airborne Division at Fort Bragg, North Carolina, as a company commander, operations officer, logistics officer, and in several other roles; and as a foreign area officer with the 229th Military Intelligence Battalion in Thessaloniki, Greece.

Poppas served as an operations officer in the Operations Directorate (J3) of the Joint Staff in Washington, D.C., before returning to the 82nd Airborne Division in 2005. He was the commander of the 3rd Battalion, 505th Infantry, and then commanded 5th Squadron, 73rd Cavalry Regiment, during which time he was also deployed to Iraq. Poppas later served in the 101st Airborne Division, first as the commander of its 1st Brigade Combat Team and then as the division's deputy commanding general (operations). In both roles, he had deployments to Afghanistan. He returned to Washington, D.C., as deputy director for Regional Operations and Force Management on the Joint Staff, and then was director of Force Management in the Army Staff. In 2017, he was made commander of the 101st Airborne Division, and in 2018, he was promoted to lieutenant general. While serving as commander of the 101st Airborne, he was deployed to Afghanistan again.

He later served as the director for Operations of the Joint Staff, and after that he was the director of the Joint Staff. In 2022, Poppas became the commanding general of the United States Army Forces Command, the largest command in the Army, and was promoted to general.

== Personal life ==
He is married to his wife Beth, and they have three children.

As a foreign area officer, Poppas studied the Greek language at the Defense Language Institute.

== Awards and decorations ==
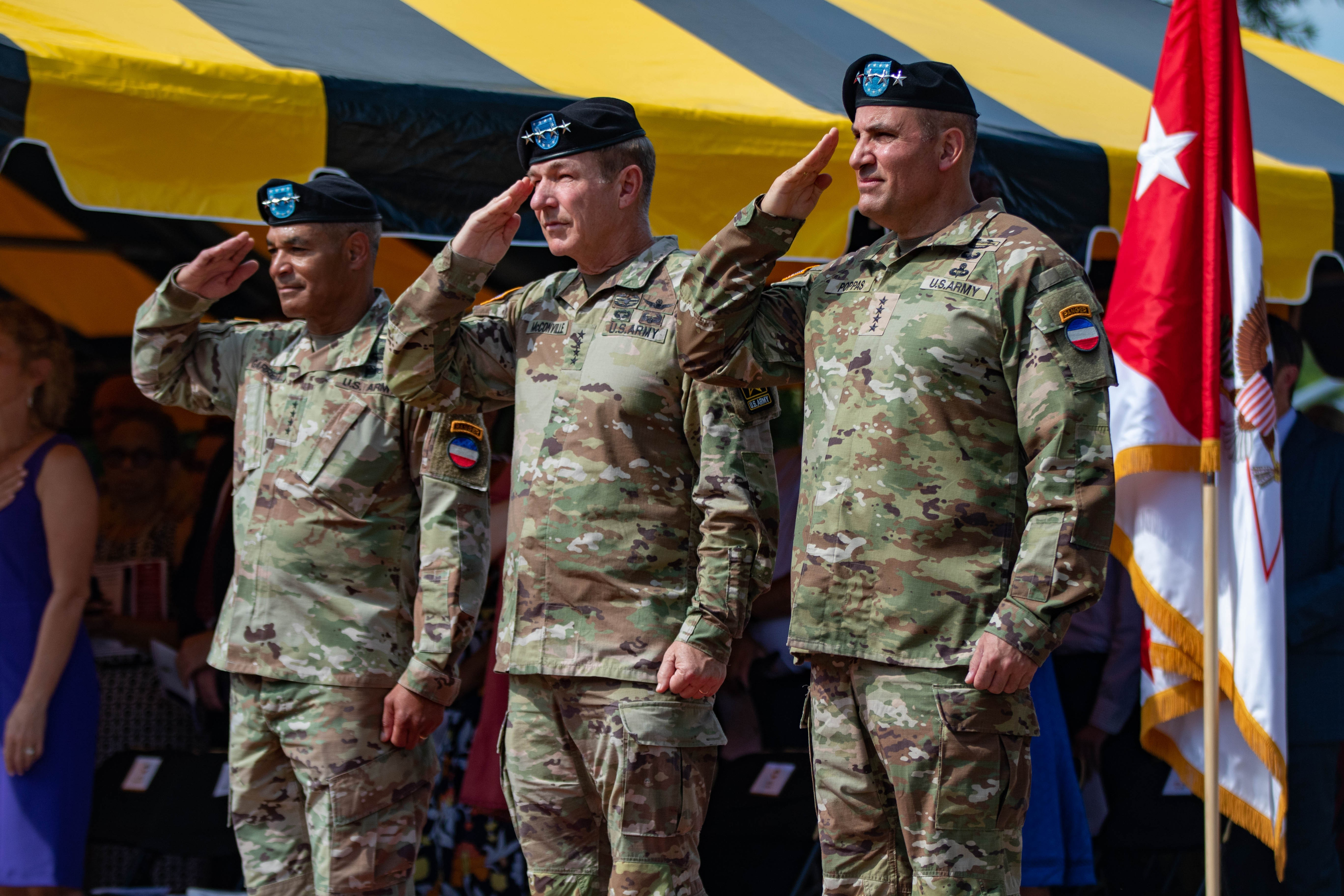
Gen. Michael X. Garrett, outgoing FORSCOM commander (left), Gen. James C. McConville, chief of staff of the Army (middle) and Gen. Poppas, incoming FORSCOM commander (right), salute the flag at the 2022 FORSCOM change of command ceremony on July 8, 2022.

Combat Infantryman Badge
Master Parachutist Badge
Ranger tab
Air Assault Badge
Joint Chiefs of Staff Identification Badge
101st Airborne Division Combat Service Identification Badge
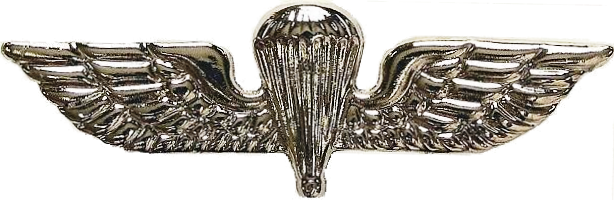
Master Greek Parachutist Badge
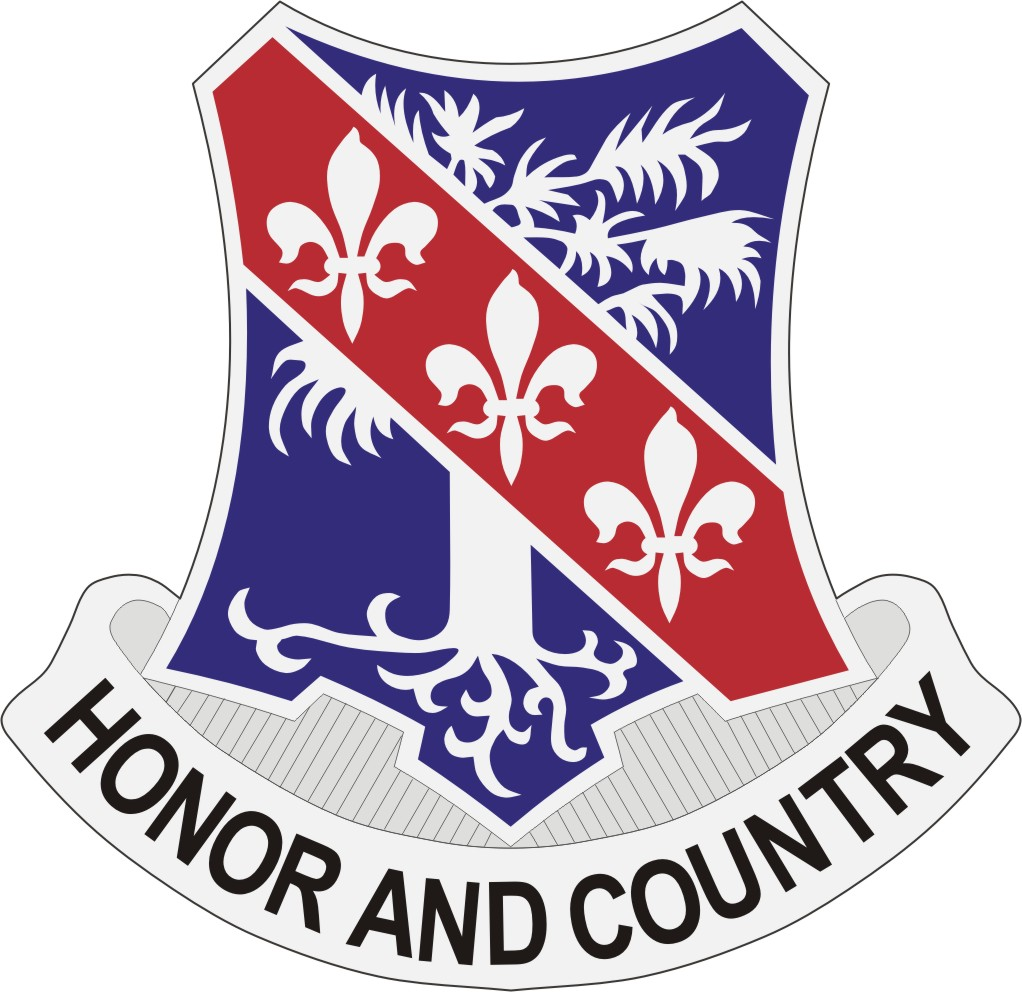
327th Infantry Regiment Distinctive Unit Insignia
8 Overseas Service Bars

Army Distinguished Service Medal
Defense Superior Service Medal with one bronze oak leaf cluster
Legion of Merit with two oak leaf clusters
Bronze Star Medal with "V" device and three oak leaf clusters
Purple Heart
Defense Meritorious Service Medal
Meritorious Service Medal with three oak leaf clusters
Joint Service Commendation Medal
Army Commendation Medal with "V" device, one silver and one bronze oak leaf clusters
Army Achievement Medal with oak leaf cluster
Army Presidential Unit Citation
Joint Meritorious Unit Award
Meritorious Unit Commendation with two oak leaf clusters
National Defense Service Medal with one bronze service star
Afghanistan Campaign Medal with three campaign stars
Iraq Campaign Medal with two campaign stars
Global War on Terrorism Service Medal
Humanitarian Service Medal
Army Service Ribbon
Army Overseas Service Ribbon with bronze award numeral 5
NATO Meritorious Service Medal
NATO Medal for service with ISAF

Military offices
Preceded by ???	Director of Regional Operations and Force Management of the Joint Staff; 2014–2016	Succeeded by Randy A. George
Preceded by Randy A. George	Director of Force Management of the United States Army; 2016	Succeeded by Michael L. Howard
Preceded by Gary J. Volesky	Commander of the 101st Airborne Division; 2017–2019	Succeeded by Brian E. Winski
Preceded by Michael M. Gilday	Director for Operations of the Joint Staff; 2019–2020	Succeeded by James Mingus
Preceded by William D. Byrne Jr. Acting	Director of the Joint Staff; 2020–2022	Succeeded by James Mingus
Preceded by Michael X. Garrett	Commanding General of the United States Army Forces Command; 2022–2025	Command disbanded
