= Brian E. Winski =

American general

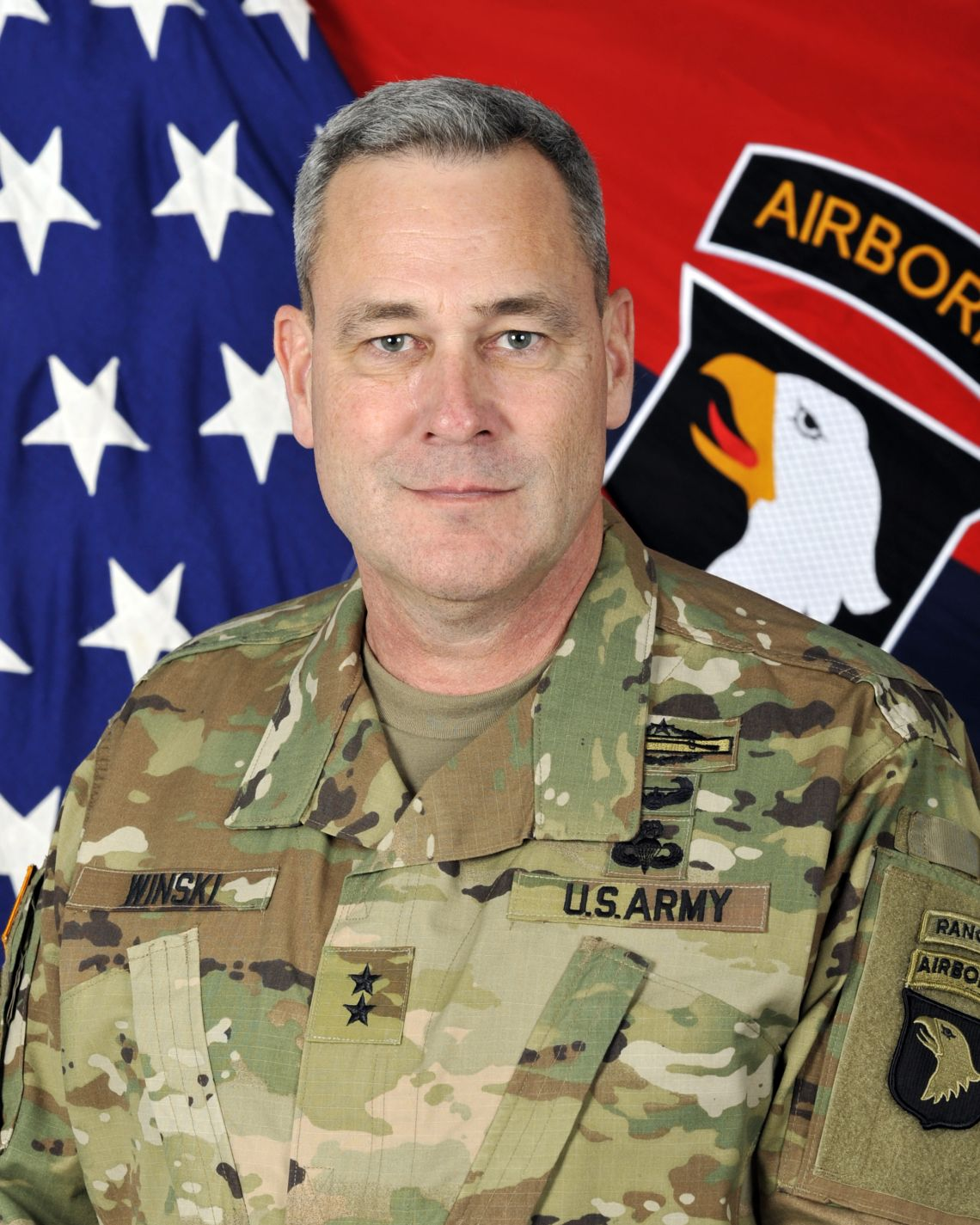
- Born: Brian Edward Winski; March 23, 1967 (age 59); Fairfax, Virginia, U.S.
- Allegiance: United States
- Branch: United States Army
- Service years: 1989–2021
- Rank: Major general
- Commands: 101st Airborne Division; 4th Brigade Combat Team, 1st Cavalry Division; 1st Squadron, 61st Cavalry Regiment
- Education: University of Wisconsin–Milwaukee (BA); Louisiana State University (MA)
- Spouse: Kimberly Anne Bodoh (m. 1989)

Major General Brian Edward Winski is a decorated commander in the U.S. Army. He was appointed commander of the 101st Airborne Division in 2019 and succeeded by Major General Joseph P. McGee in 2021.

He is retired as of March 5, 2021.

== Education ==
Winski was born in Fairfax, Virginia, and raised in Milwaukee, Wisconsin. He graduated from Milwaukee Trade and Technical High School in 1984 and graduated from the University of Wisconsin-Milwaukee in 1989 with a Bachelor of Arts degree in history; he also attended Army ROTC there which started off his career in the United States Army. After graduation, he was commissioned as a 2nd Lieutenant in the Army. Later, he would graduate from Louisiana State University with a Master of Arts degree in history and liberal arts, graduating in 2000.

== Early army career ==
Winski originally served as an infantry officer in the 3rd Infantry Division 1st Brigade, Delta company 2nd Battalion 327th Infantry Regiment of the 101st Airborne Division. Later, he would serve as a company commander of the 3rd Infantry Division until 1998, where he started his Master studies at LSU. After his studies, he continued service in the 101st Airborne Division, serving at its base in Fort Campbell, Kentucky, and war-time service in both Iraq and Afghanistan.

== Commanding and U.S. Senate career ==
From 2005 to 2006 he was the squadron commander of the 1st Squadron, 61st Cavalry Regiment in Iraq. For two years, from 2009 to 2011, Winski served as the 4th Brigade combat team commander of the 1st Cavalry Division based at Fort Hood in Killeen, Texas. He would attend the Army War College afterwards for a year from a Washington Institute for Near East Policy fellowship.

He would serve as a US Army legislative liaison and later the chief legislative liaison for the Office of the Secretary of the Army. Between serving as a legislative liaison and the Chief Army legislative liaison, he was the deputy commanding general for operations for the 82nd Airborne Division based in Fort Bragg, North Carolina, for two years between 2014 and 2016, serving as a brigadier general then.

In 2019, Winski, now a major general, was appointed commanding general of the 101st Airborne Division.

== Personal life ==
Winski married in May 1989 to Kimberly Anne Bodoh around the same time as his graduation from the University of Wisconsin-Milwaukee.

Military offices
Preceded by Walter E. Piatt	Director of Operations, Readiness and Mobilization of the United States Army; 2016–2017	Succeeded by Douglas Sims II
Preceded by Laura J. Richardson	Chief Legislative Liaison of the United States Army; 2017–2018	Succeeded by Brian S. Eifler
Preceded by Andrew P. Poppas	Commander of the 101st Airborne Division; 2019–2021	Succeeded by Joseph McGee
