= William F. Kernan =

United States Army general (1946–2025)

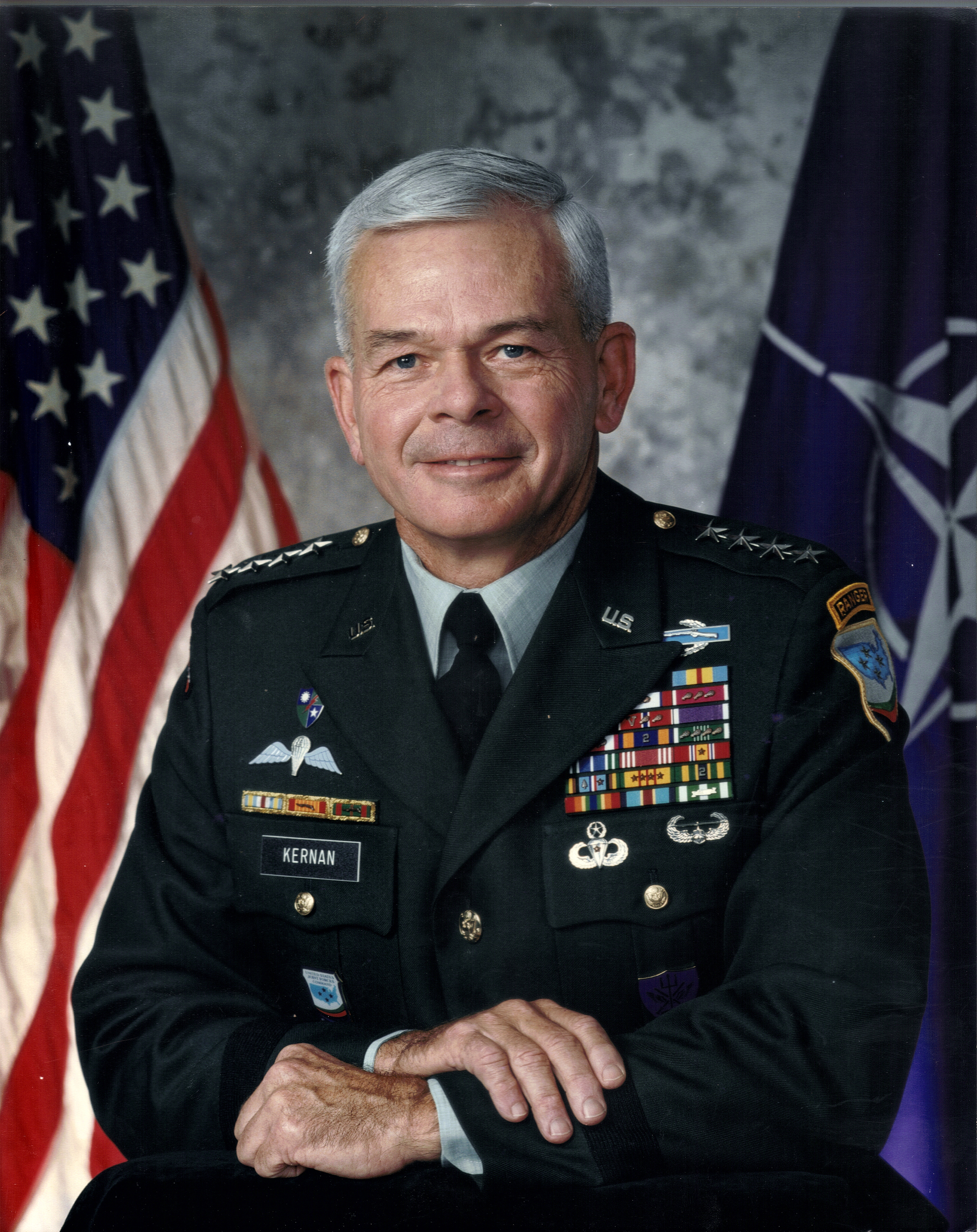
- Official portrait, 2000
- Born: January 29, 1946; Fort Sam Houston, Texas, U.S.
- Died: September 2, 2025 (aged 79); Pinehurst, North Carolina, U.S.
- Burial place: Arlington National Cemetery, Arlington, Virginia, U.S.
- Military career
- Allegiance: United States of America
- Branch: United States Army
- Service years: 1968–2002
- Rank: General
- Nickname: Buck
- Commands: Joint Forces Command; XVIII Airborne Corps; 101st Airborne Division; 75th Ranger Regiment
- Conflicts: Vietnam War; Operation Just Cause

General William F. "Buck" Kernan (January 29, 1946 – September 2, 2025) was a General in the United States Army.

== Life and career ==
Kernan was born in Fort Sam Houston, Texas, on January 29, 1946. He was commissioned in November 1968 from Officer Candidate School at Fort Benning, Georgia. He held a Bachelor of Arts degree in history from Our Lady of the Lake University and a Master of Arts degree in personnel administration from Central Michigan University. His military education includes the Infantry Advanced Course, the U.S. Army Command and General Staff College, and the U.S. Army War College.

Kernan's initial assignment was as liaison officer with the 1st Brigade, 82nd Airborne Division, Fort Bragg, North Carolina. Assigned to Vietnam in August 1969, he served with the 1st Battalion, 327th Infantry Regiment, 101st Airborne Division, as a Rifle Platoon Leader, Battalion Reconnaissance Platoon Leader (Tiger Force), and Assistant S3. Following this assignment, he returned to Fort Bragg, North Carolina, and served as company commander, 2d Battalion (Airborne), 325th Infantry.

Upon completion of the Infantry Officer Advanced Course in March 1974, Kernan was assigned to the U.S. Army Recruiting Command as an area commander in Austin, Texas. Joining the 2nd Ranger Battalion at Fort Lewis, Washington, in April 1976, he commanded two companies and was the assistant S3 before departing in July 1978 to attend the Command and General Staff College at Fort Leavenworth, Kansas. In July 1979, he was assigned to the Military Personnel Center in Washington, D.C., initially to the DA Secretariat, and then to the Officer Personnel Management Directorate as an Infantry Branch Assignment Officer. In August 1981, he was selected to be the U.S. Exchange Officer representing the 82d Airborne Division to the British Parachute Regiment, where he commanded Company C, 3 Para, for two years. Upon his return from England in July 1983, Kernan joined the 2d Battalion (Airborne), 508th Infantry Regiment, 82d Airborne Division, where he served as the executive officer and battalion commander. After completing the Army War College in July 1987, he assumed command of the 1st Battalion, 75th Ranger Regiment, Hunter Army Airfield, Georgia. In December 1988, he assumed the duties as deputy commander, 75th Ranger Regiment, Fort Benning, Georgia, and held that position until June 20, 1989, when he assumed command of the 75th Ranger Regiment. On December 20, 1989, he led the 75th Ranger Regiment in its combat parachute assault into Panama during Operation Just Cause. In September 1991, he was assigned to the 7th Infantry Division (Light), Fort Ord, California, where he served as the Assistant Division Commander (Maneuver). In July 1993, he was assigned as the director of plans, policy, and strategic assessments, J5, United States Special Operations Command, MacDill Air Force Base, Florida. General Kernan commanded the 101st Airborne Division (Air Assault) from February 1996 until February 1998 and assumed command of the XVIII Airborne Corps and Fort Bragg on March 12, 1998. Beginning in September 2000, Kernan served as Supreme Allied Commander, Atlantic and Commander in Chief, U.S. Joint Forces Command in Norfolk, Virginia, until he retired from active service in October 2002.

In 2011, Kernan was awarded the third-highest honor within the Department of the Army Civilian Awards, the Outstanding Civilian Service Award, for substantial contributions to the U.S. Army community through his work with the Patriot Foundation.

Kernan died in Pinehurst, North Carolina, on September 2, 2025, at the age of 79.

== Awards and decorations ==
Kernan has been decorated for service, to include:

| Badge | Combat Infantryman Badge | | |
| Badge | Master Combat Parachutist Badge w/ Bronze Star | | |
| Badge | Air Assault Badge | | |
| Badge | Ranger Tab | | |
| 1st Row Awards | Defense Distinguished Service Medal w/ oak leaf cluster | | Distinguished Service Medal w/ oak leaf cluster |
| 2nd Row Awards | Legion of Merit w/ 3 oak leaf clusters | Bronze Star w/ valor device & 2 oak leaf clusters | Purple Heart |
| 3rd Row Awards | Meritorious Service Medal w/ 3 oak leaf clusters | Air Medal w/ Numeral "2" | Army Commendation Medal w/ 4 oak leaf clusters |
| 4th Row Awards | Army Achievement Medal | Army Good Conduct Medal | National Defense Service Medal w/ 2 service stars |
| 5th Row Awards | Armed Forces Expeditionary Medal w/ Arrowhead & 1 service star | Vietnam Service Medal w/ 4 service star | NCO Professional Development Ribbon w/ award numeral 2 |
| 6th Row Awards | Army Service Ribbon | Army Overseas Service Ribbon | Vietnam Campaign Medal w/ "60" Device |
| Unit awards | Joint Meritorious Unit Award | Vietnam Gallantry Cross Unit Citation | Vietnam Civil Actions Unit Citation |

Military offices
| Preceded by Wesley B. Taylor, Jr. | Commander, 75th Ranger Regiment; 1989–1991 | Succeeded by David L. Grange |
| Preceded by John M. Keane | Commander, 101st Airborne Division; 1996–1998 | Succeeded by Robert T. Clark |
