= Brett Sylvia =

U.S. Army general

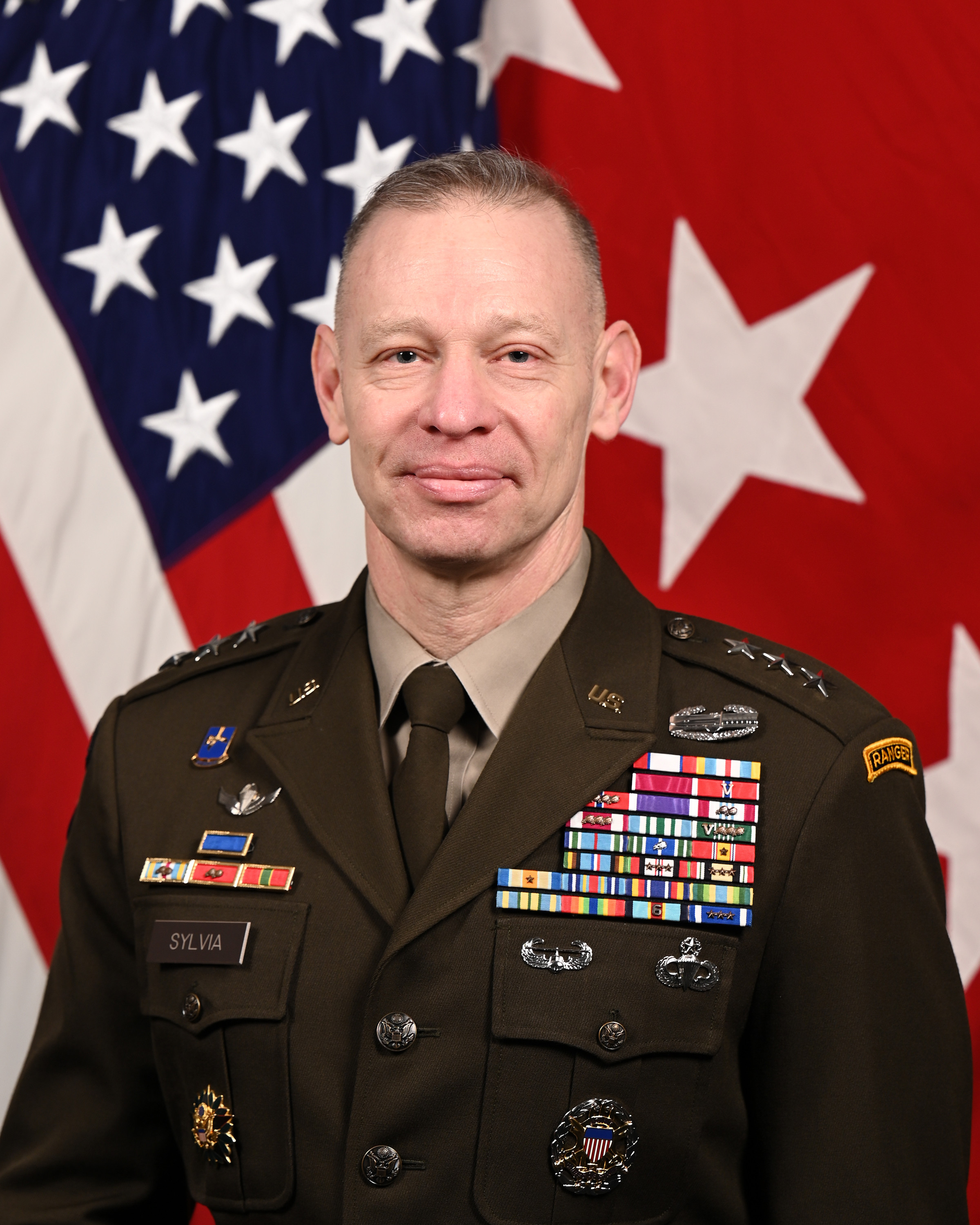
- Sylvia in 2025
- Born: 12 September 1972 (age 54); Missouri, U.S.
- Military career
- Allegiance: United States
- Branch: United States Army
- Service years: 1994–2026
- Rank: Lieutenant General
- Commands: 101st Airborne Division; 2nd Brigade Combat Team, 101st Airborne Division; 307th Engineer Battalion
- Conflicts: War in Afghanistan; Iraq War; Operation Inherent Resolve
- Awards: Army Distinguished Service Medal; Defense Superior Service Medal; Legion of Merit (5); Bronze Star Medal (6); Purple Heart

Brett Gareth Sylvia (born 12 September 1972) is a United States Army lieutenant general who served as the director of Strategy, Plans, and Policy of the Joint Staff from 2025 to 2026. He previously served as the commanding general of the 101st Airborne Division and Fort Campbell from 2023 to 2025, and as the vice director for strategy, plans, and policy of the Joint Staff.

== Early life ==
Sylvia was born on 12 September 1972, in St. Charles, Missouri, to Garrett V. "Bo" Sylvia and his wife Carol. He had an older brother, Gabriel. His father coached sports at Lindenwood College for Men and his mother taught mathematics in the public schools.

The family moved to Hilton Head Island, South Carolina, when Brett was a freshman in high school. Sylvia excelled academically and played soccer. In his senior year he was both salutatorian at Hilton Head Island High School and South Carolina State Player of the Year in soccer. Sylvia credits his father and high school science teacher Kathy Howard for pushing him to achieve far more than he thought he was capable of.

== Military career ==
Sylvia is a 1994 graduate of the United States Military Academy with a Bachelor of Science degree in environmental engineering. He later earned a Master of Science degree in engineering management from the Missouri University of Science and Technology and a Master of Military Arts and Sciences degree from the School of Advanced Military Studies at the Army Command and General Staff College.

After being commissioned as a Corps of Engineers officer, Sylvia served in the 16th Engineer Battalion in Germany from 1995 to 1998. He was stationed at Fort Leonard Wood from 1998 to 1999, before serving in the 307th Airborne Engineer Battalion at Fort Bragg from 1999 to 2002. Sylvia worked in the Pentagon from 2002 to 2004, at Fort Leavenworth from 2004 to 2006, at Fort Bragg from 2006 to 2008, and then in the Pentagon again in 2008.

In July 2023, Sylvia assumed command of the 101st Airborne Division. In December 2024, he was nominated for promotion to lieutenant general and assignment as director for strategy, plans and policy of the Joint Staff.

After being removed from his position without explanation in October 2026, Sylvia retired from the Army. An unnamed Pentagon official told CBS News and The Hill that Sylvia was removed by Secretary of Defense Pete Hegseth after allegedly failing three polygraph tests about classified information leaked to the press on the Russian-Ukraine war and the Iran war. An unnamed senior Pentagon official told the Washington Sun that the investigation had been referred to the Justice Department and that no further details would be provided.

== Personal life ==
Sylvia and his wife, Lori (née Hawkins), have five children.

Military offices
Preceded by Joseph McGee	Commanding General of the 101st Airborne Division; 2023–2025	Succeeded by David W. Gardner
Preceded by Joseph McGee	Director for Strategy, Plans, and Policy of the Joint Staff; 2025–2026	Succeeded by TBA
