= Stephen Lanza =

Retired U.S. Army Lieutenant general

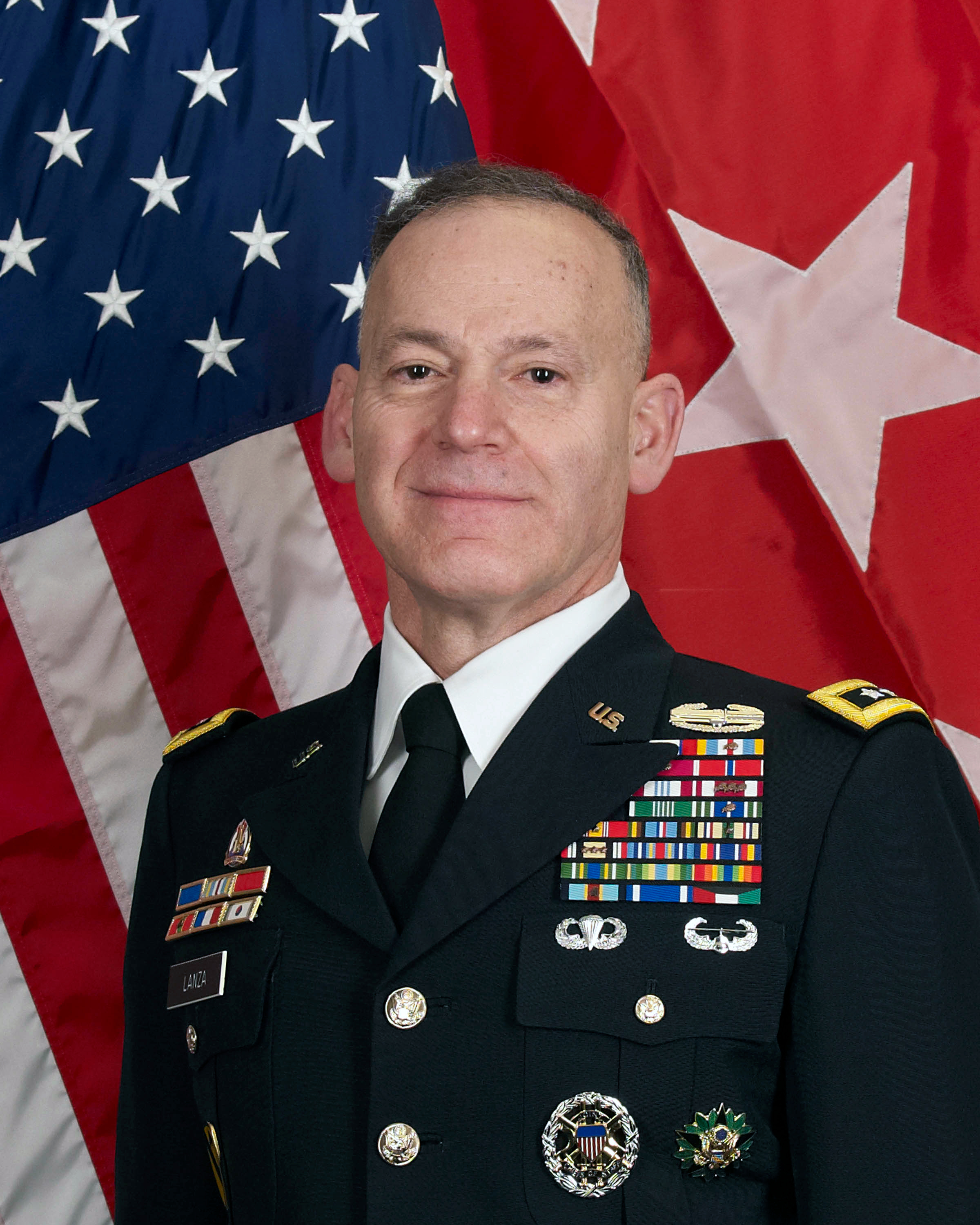
- Born: Stephen Raymond Lanza; May 10, 1957 (age 69)
- Military career
- Allegiance: United States
- Branch: United States Army
- Service years: 1980–2017
- Rank: Lieutenant General
- Commands: I Corps; 7th Infantry Division; First Cavalry Division Artillery
- Conflicts: Gulf War; Iraq War
- Awards: Army Distinguished Service Medal (2); Defense Superior Service Medal (2); Legion of Merit (2); Bronze Star Medal

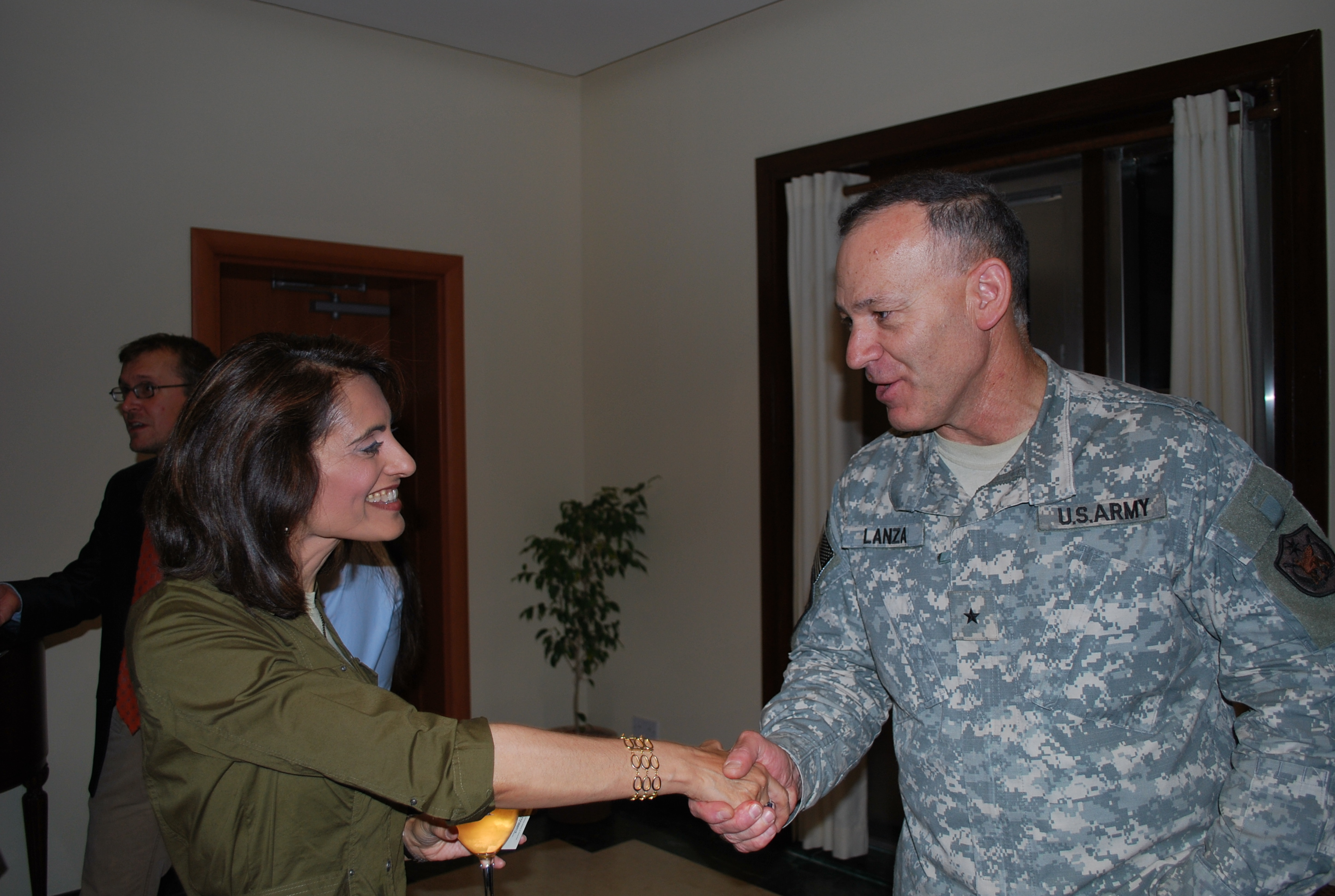
Then-Brig Gen Lanza with FOX News correspondent Malini Wilkes, at the U.S. embassy in Baghdad. June 2009.

Stephen Lanza (born May 10, 1957) is a retired United States Army lieutenant general who served as commanding general, I Corps at Joint Base Lewis–McChord from February 6, 2014, to April 3, 2017, when he transferred authority to Lieutenant General Gary J. Volesky. He retired from active service on June 2, 2017.

== Early life and education ==
Lanza was commissioned into the Field Artillery in 1980, after graduating from the United States Military Academy at West Point. He is a graduate of the United States Army Command and General Staff College and the School for Advanced Military Studies at Fort Leavenworth, Kansas. He has a Bachelor of Science degree from the United States Military Academy, a Master of Science in Administration from Central Michigan University and a Master of Science in National Security and Strategic Studies from the National War College at Fort Lesley J. McNair, Washington D.C. He has also served as a National Security Fellow at Massachusetts Institute of Technology, Cambridge, Massachusetts.

== Military career ==
Lanza has commanded soldiers at all levels including the 7th Infantry Division; 5th Brigade Combat Team, 1st Cavalry Division, Fort Hood, Texas and Operation Iraqi Freedom, Iraq; and the 1st Battalion, 5th Field Artillery, 1st Infantry Division, Fort Riley, Kansas.

Lanza's senior staff assignments include the aide-de-camp to the Commander in Chief, United States Army Europe/Commander, NATO Peace Stabilization Force; Concepts Team Chief for the Office of the Deputy Chief of Staff for Operations, G3, Pentagon; Chief, Joint Capabilities Division, J8, the Joint Staff, Pentagon; Deputy Commanding General for V Corps, U.S. Army Europe and Seventh Army, Germany; G3, Chief of Operations, U.S. Army Europe and Seventh Army, Germany; J9, Director for Strategic Effects, Multi-National Forces-Iraq (MNF-I), Iraq; Spokesman, United States Force-Iraq (USF-I), Iraq; and the Army's Chief of Public Affairs for the Secretary of the Army, Washington D.C. His operational deployment experience includes Operations Desert Shield and Desert Storm, Saudi Arabia; Operation Joint Guard, Bosnia-Herzegovina; Operation Iraqi Freedom, Iraq; and Operation New Dawn, Iraq.

== Awards and Recognitions ==
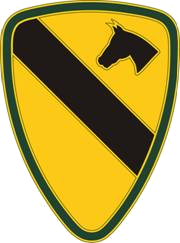
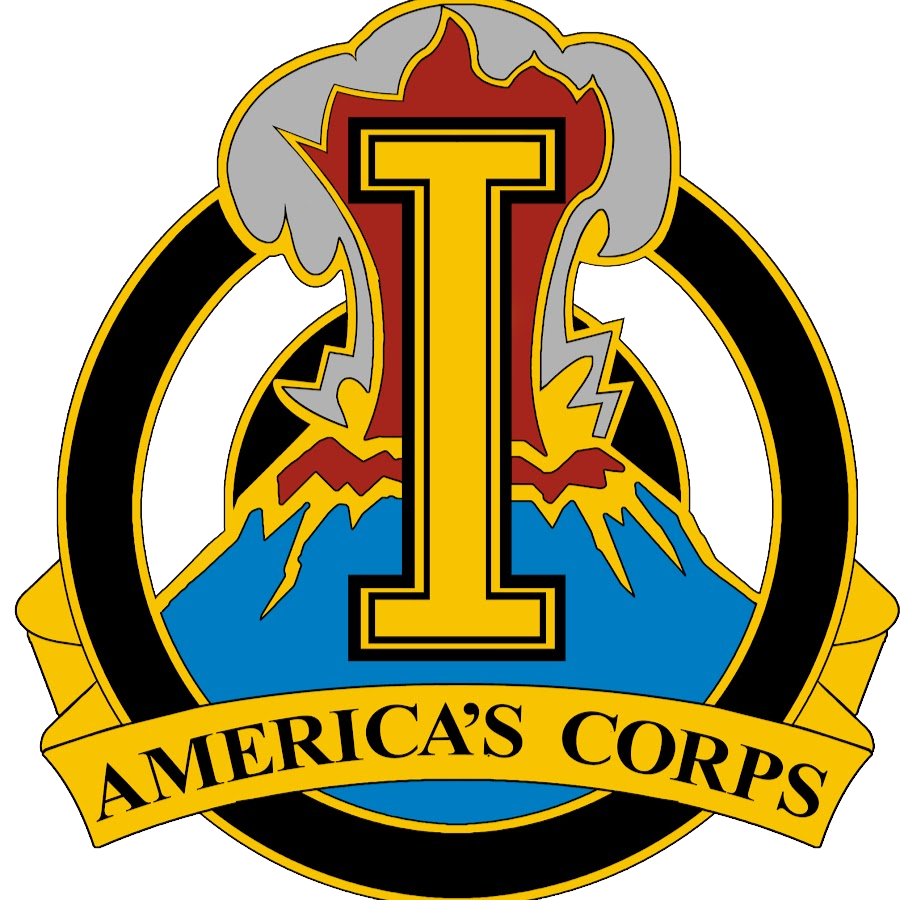
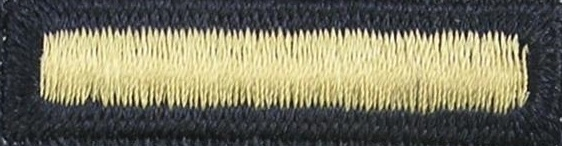
Combat Action Badge
Basic Parachutist Badge
Air Assault Badge
Office of the Joint Chiefs of Staff Identification Badge
Army Staff Identification Badge
1st Cavalry Division Combat Service Identification Badge
I Corps Distinctive Unit Insignia
6 Overseas Service Bars

Army Distinguished Service Medal with one bronze oak leaf cluster
Defense Superior Service Medal with one oak leaf cluster
Legion of Merit with one oak leaf cluster
Bronze Star Medal
Defense Meritorious Service Medal
Meritorious Service Medal with three oak leaf clusters
Army Commendation Medal
Army Achievement Medal with one oak leaf cluster
Army Presidential Unit Citation
Joint Meritorious Unit Award
Meritorious Unit Commendation
Superior Unit Award with oak leaf cluster
National Defense Service Medal with one bronze service star
Armed Forces Expeditionary Medal
Southwest Asia Service Medal with service star
Iraq Campaign Medal with three service stars
Global War on Terrorism Expeditionary Medal
Global War on Terrorism Service Medal
Korea Defense Service Medal
Armed Forces Service Medal
Army Service Ribbon
Army Overseas Service Ribbon with bronze award numeral 4
NATO Medal for the Former Yugoslavia
Republic of Korea Presidential Unit Citation
Kuwait Liberation Medal (Kuwait)

Military offices
Preceded by Robert B. Brown	Commander, I Corps; 2014–2017	Succeeded by Gary J. Volesky
