= Thomas M. Tarpley =

United States Army general

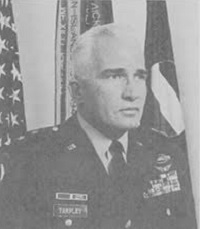
Maj. Gen. Thomas M. Tarpley

Thomas McKee Tarpley (4 July 1922 – 18 December 1986) was an American soldier in the United States Army. He graduated from the U.S. Military Academy at West Point in 1944. Tarpley then served in World War II and in Vietnam, from February 1971 to April 1972 as the commander of 101st Airborne Division. He last served as commandant of the U.S. Army Infantry Center from 1973 until his retirement in 1975.

== Early life and education ==
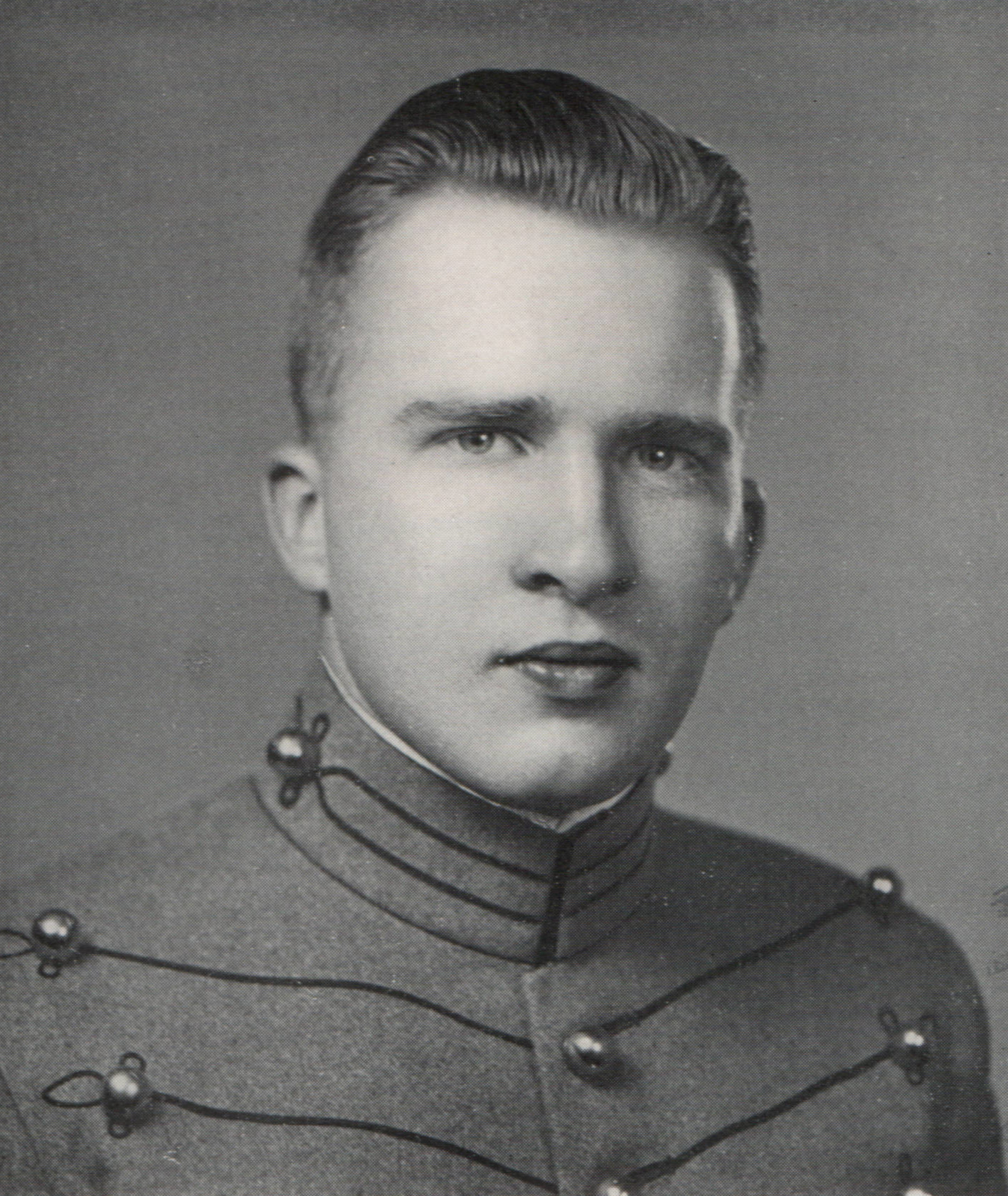
At West Point in 1944

Tarpley was born and raised in Quincy, Illinois. After graduating from high school, he attended Westminster College in Fulton, Missouri for two years before being appointed to the United States Military Academy in 1941. Tarpley received a B.S. degree in June 1944 and was commissioned as an infantry second lieutenant. He later earned two M.A. degrees in 1963, one in history from the University of Maryland and another in international affairs from George Washington University. Tarpley graduated from the Infantry School Basic Course in 1944, the Infantry School Advanced Course in 1951, the Army Command and General Staff College in 1954 and the Army War College in 1963.

== Military career ==
During World War II, Tarpley served in combat as a platoon leader with the 66th Infantry Division in Europe. After the war, he commanded a company at Fort Riley.

After graduating from the Command and General Staff College, Tarpley was assigned to the faculty there. He then served a postwar tour in South Korea.

After graduating from the Army War College, Tarpley commanded a battalion of the 5th Infantry from 1963 to 1966 and the 2nd Brigade, 25th Infantry Division in 1966 in Vietnam.

Promoted to brigadier general, Tarpley received rotary-wing flight training. He then served as a deputy commanding general at Fort Lewis from 1969 to 1971.

== Honors ==
During World War II, Tarpley was awarded a Bronze Star Medal with "V" device. During the Vietnam War, he was presented a second Bronze Star Medal with "V" device, five Air Medals and two awards of the Legion of Merit. Tarpley also received two Army Distinguished Service Medals and retired as a Major General.

== Personal ==
Tarpley was the son of Hugh M. Tarpley, a retired Army major, and Mildred (McKee) Tarpley.

Tarpley married Gertrude "Trudy" Baldwin. They had four sons, one of whom died in an accident as a high school senior.

After retirement, Tarpley and his wife lived near Fort Benning in Columbus, Georgia. He died there in 1986. Tarpley and his wife were interred at the Fort Benning Main Post Cemetery.
