= John J. Hennessey =

United States Army general

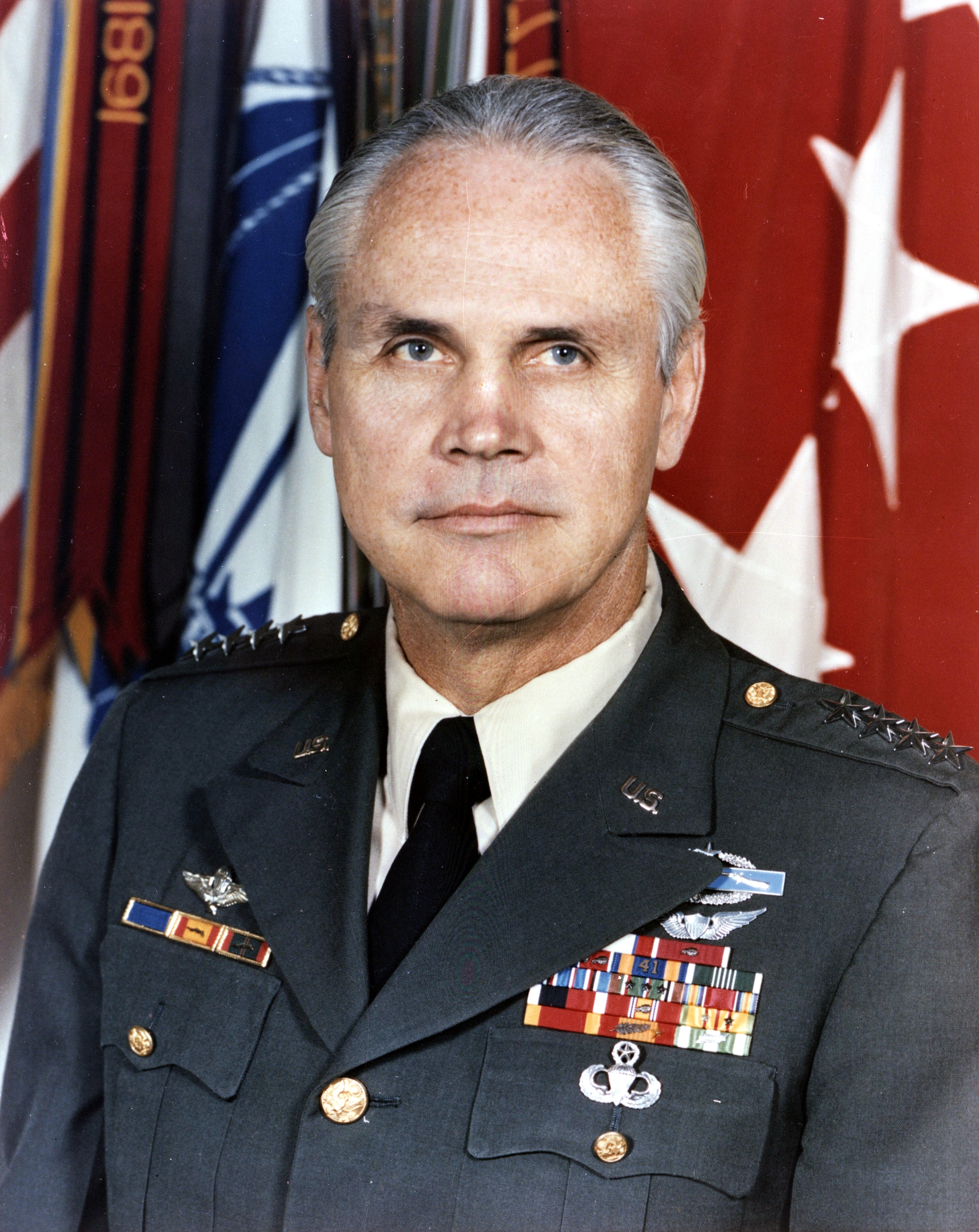
- General John J. Hennessey
- Born: 20 August 1921; Chicago, Illinois
- Died: 20 March 2001 (aged 79); Tampa, Florida
- Military career
- Allegiance: United States of America
- Branch: United States Army
- Service years: 1944–1979
- Rank: General
- Commands: Readiness Command; 101st Airborne Division
- Conflicts: World War II; Korean War; Vietnam War
- Awards: Legion of Merit (2); Bronze Star with "V" (4); Air Medal (5)
- Other work: Board of Trustees, University of Tampa

John Joseph Timothy Hennessey (20 August 1921 – 20 March 2001) was a United States Army four-star general who served as Commander in Chief, United States Readiness Command (USCINCRED) from 1974 to 1979.

== Military career ==
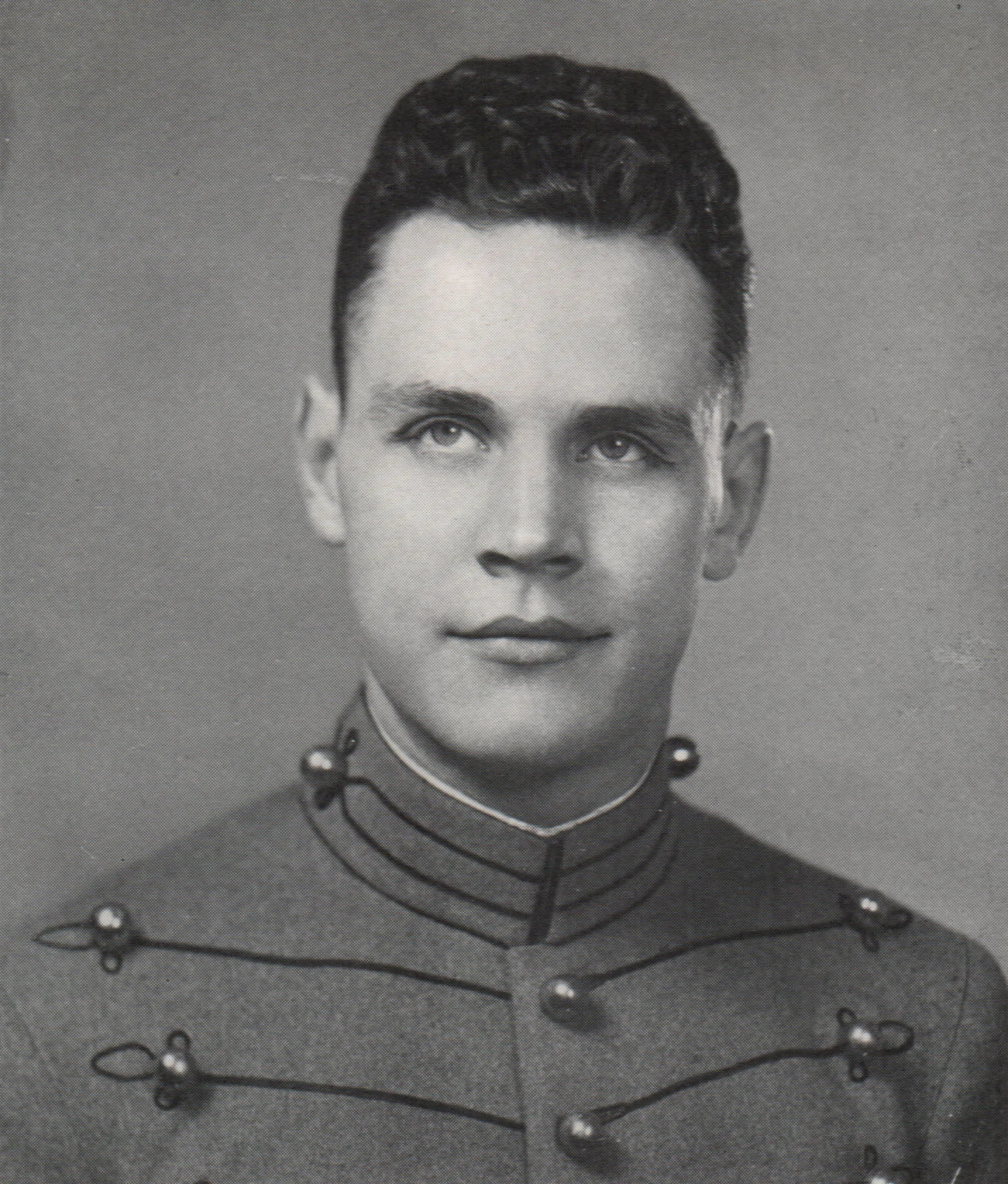
At West Point in 1944

After attending Saint Mary's University of Minnesota for three years, Hennessey enrolled in the United States Military Academy and graduated in 1944, receiving his commission in the infantry. He deployed to the Europe Theater, serving as a platoon leader and company commander.

In the Korean War he served on the staff of I Corps. By the Vietnam War he was a battalion commander in the 11th Air Assault Division, later serving as executive officer of the division's 1st Brigade. When the 11th Air Assault Division was converted to the 1st Cavalry Division (Air Mobile) in 1965, he accompanied that unit to Vietnam as executive officer of the 1st Brigade, later becoming brigade commander after being promoted to full colonel.

On 4 August 1967 the Chief of Staff of the United States Army established the Task Group on Army Preparedness in Civil Disturbance Matters chaired by Hennessey from the Office of the Deputy Chief of Staff for Military Operations, the work of this task group was conducted largely by field grade officers and was probably the most comprehensive study of the Army's civil disturbance mission ever conducted.

As a brigadier general he served as assistant division commander of the 82nd Airborne Division, then became assistant division commander of the 101st Airborne Division, deploying with that unit to Vietnam as its commander in 1970.

In 1974 he received his fourth star and assumed command of the United States Readiness Command at MacDill Air Force Base in December 1974. He retired in 1979 at the end of that tour.

== Decorations ==
His awards and decorations include the Defense Distinguished Service Medal, the Army Distinguished Service Medal, Legion of Merit with Oak Leaf Cluster, the Bronze Star with "V" and three Oak Leaf Clusters, the Air Medal with four Oak Leaf Clusters, the Combat Infantryman Badge, Army Aviator Badge and Master Parachutist badge.

- Defense Distinguished Service Medal
- Army Distinguished Service Medal
- Legion of Merit with oak leaf cluster
- Bronze Star with Combat V and three oak leaf clusters
- Air Medal with eight silver oak leaf clusters

== Post military career ==
After retiring from the Army, Hennessey served on the board of trustees of the University of Tampa and was executive director of the Tampa Bay Area Research and Development Authority under the University of South Florida.

Hennessey died of a stroke on 20 March 2001, at the age of 79.

Military offices
Preceded by John H. Hay	Commandant of the Command and General Staff College; 1 July 1971 – August 1973	Succeeded by John H. Cushman
