= Joseph McGee (general) =

US Army general

Lieutenant General Joseph P. McGee
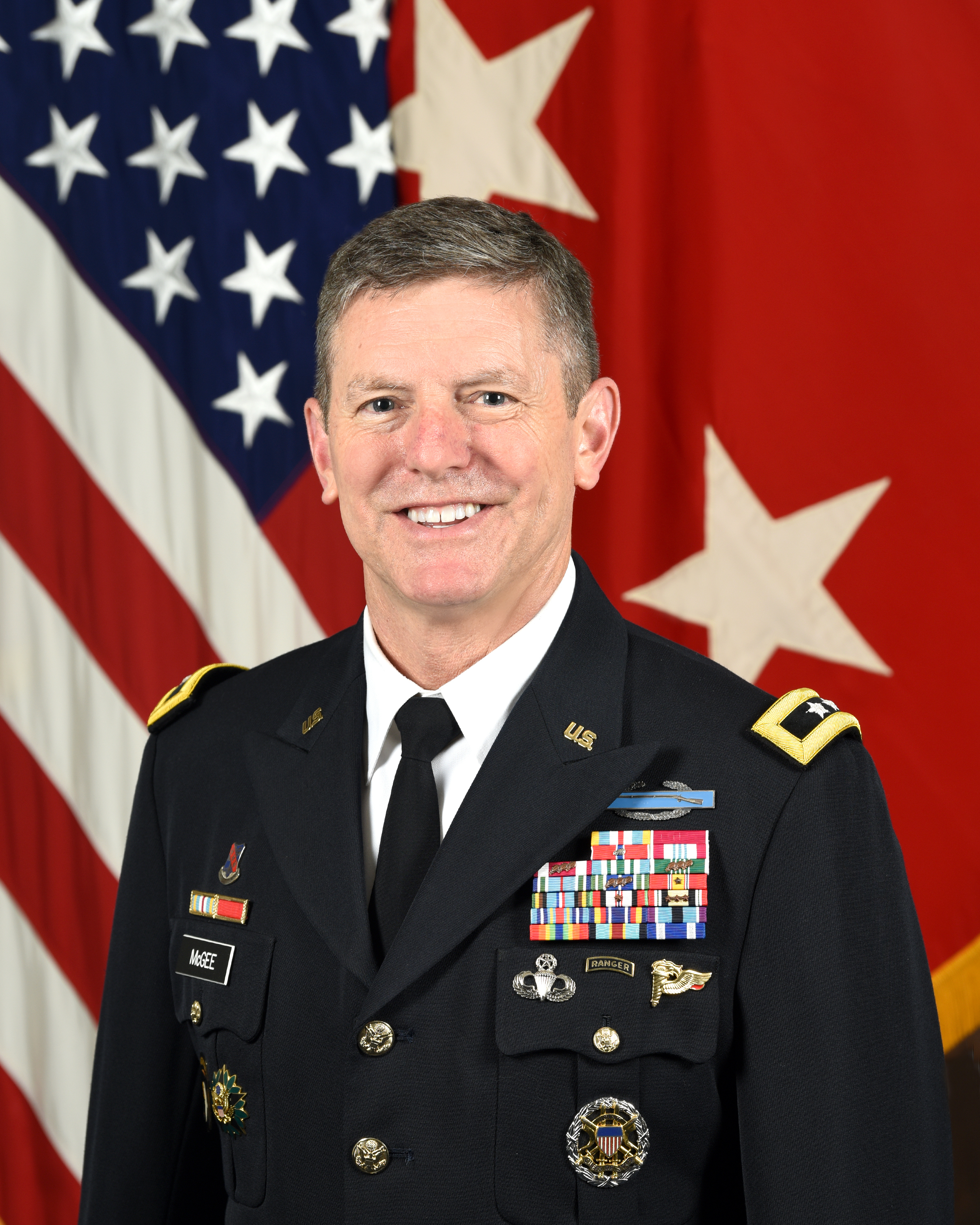
- Born: c. 1967 (age 58–59)
- Alma mater: United States Military Academy (BS); Central Michigan University (MBA)
- Military career
- Allegiance: United States
- Branch: United States Army
- Service years: 1990–present
- Rank: Lieutenant General
- Nickname: JP
- Commands: 101st Airborne Division; 1st Brigade Combat Team, 101st Airborne Division; 2nd Battalion, 327th Infantry Regiment
- Conflicts: Iraq War; War in Afghanistan
- Awards: Army Distinguished Service Medal; Defense Superior Service Medal; Legion of Merit; Bronze Star Medal (6)

Joseph Patrick McGee (born c. 1967) is a United States Army lieutenant general who served as the director for strategy, plans, and policy of the Joint Staff. He also served as the commanding general of the 101st Airborne Division and Fort Campbell from 2021 to 2023.

== Military career ==
A native of Atherton, California, McGee is a 1986 graduate of Saint Francis High School in nearby Mountain View. He graduated from the United States Military Academy in 1990 and was commissioned as an infantry officer. He is a graduate of the Infantry Officer Basic and Advanced Courses, Ranger School, Pathfinder School, and the United States Army Command and General Staff College. He holds a Bachelor of Science in Engineering from West Point, a master's degree in Administration from Central Michigan University, and is an alumnus of the army's Senior Fellows program, having served as a National Security Affairs Fellow at the Hoover Institution at Stanford University for the 2010–2011 academic year.

McGee served as director of the Army Talent Management Task Force in the office of the Army Deputy Chief of Staff (G-1) from July 2018 to February 2021, as well as deputy commanding general for operations of United States Army Cyber Command from July 2016 to June 2018. He also commanded the 1st Brigade Combat Team, 101st Airborne Division (also known as the Bastogne Brigade) from July 2011 to October 2013.

McGee's staff assignments include Deputy Executive Assistant to the 17th Chairman of the Joint Chiefs of Staff, Admiral Michael Mullen, and Executive Officer to the 38th Chief of Staff of the United States Army, General Raymond Odierno.

He was assigned to succeed Brett Sylvia as vice director for strategy, plans, and policy of the Joint Staff. In March 2024, he was nominated for promotion to lieutenant general and assignment as director for strategy, plans, and policy of the Joint Staff. His nomination was confirmed by the Senate and he was promoted to lieutenant general on May 2, 2024.

In December 2024, McGee was nominated for another assignment as a lieutenant general. He left his position as director for strategy, plans, and policy of the Joint Staff in October 2025 and his retirement was announced.

Military offices
Preceded by Patricia A. Frost	Deputy Commanding General for Operations of United States Army Cyber Command; 2016–2018	Succeeded by Richard E. Angle
Preceded by ???	Director of the Army Talent Management Task Force; 2018–2021	Succeeded by Thomas R. Drew
Preceded by Brian E. Winski	Commanding General of the 101st Airborne Division; 2021–2023	Succeeded by Brett Sylvia
Preceded by Brett Sylvia	Vice Director for Strategy, Plans, and Policy of the Joint Staff; 2023–2024	Succeeded by Mark Slocum
Preceded by Stephen Koehler	Director for Strategy, Plans, and Policy of the Joint Staff; 2024–2025	Succeeded by Brett Sylvia
