= John H. Cushman =

United States Army general (1921–1917)

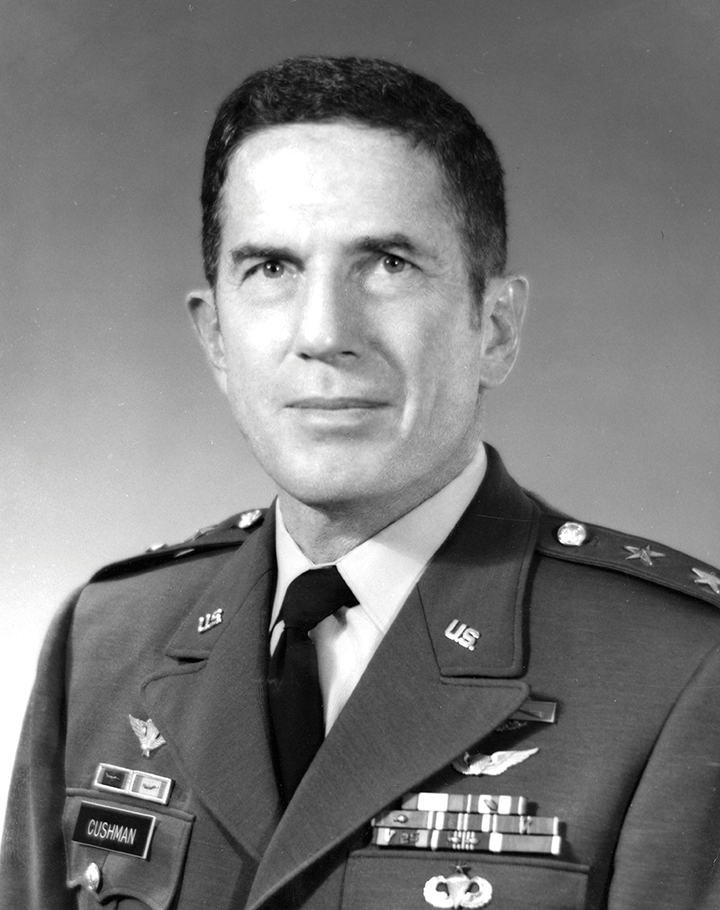
- Born: October 3, 1921; Tianjin, China
- Died: November 8, 2017 (aged 96); Washington, D.C., United States
- Military career
- Allegiance: United States
- Branch: United States Army
- Service years: 1940–1978
- Rank: Lieutenant General
- Commands: I Corps (ROK/US) Group; United States Army Command and General Staff College; 101st Airborne Division; Fort Devens; 2d Brigade, 101st Airborne Division
- Conflicts: Vietnam War
- Awards: Army Distinguished Service Medal (2); Silver Star (2); Legion of Merit (3); Distinguished Flying Cross; Bronze Star Medal

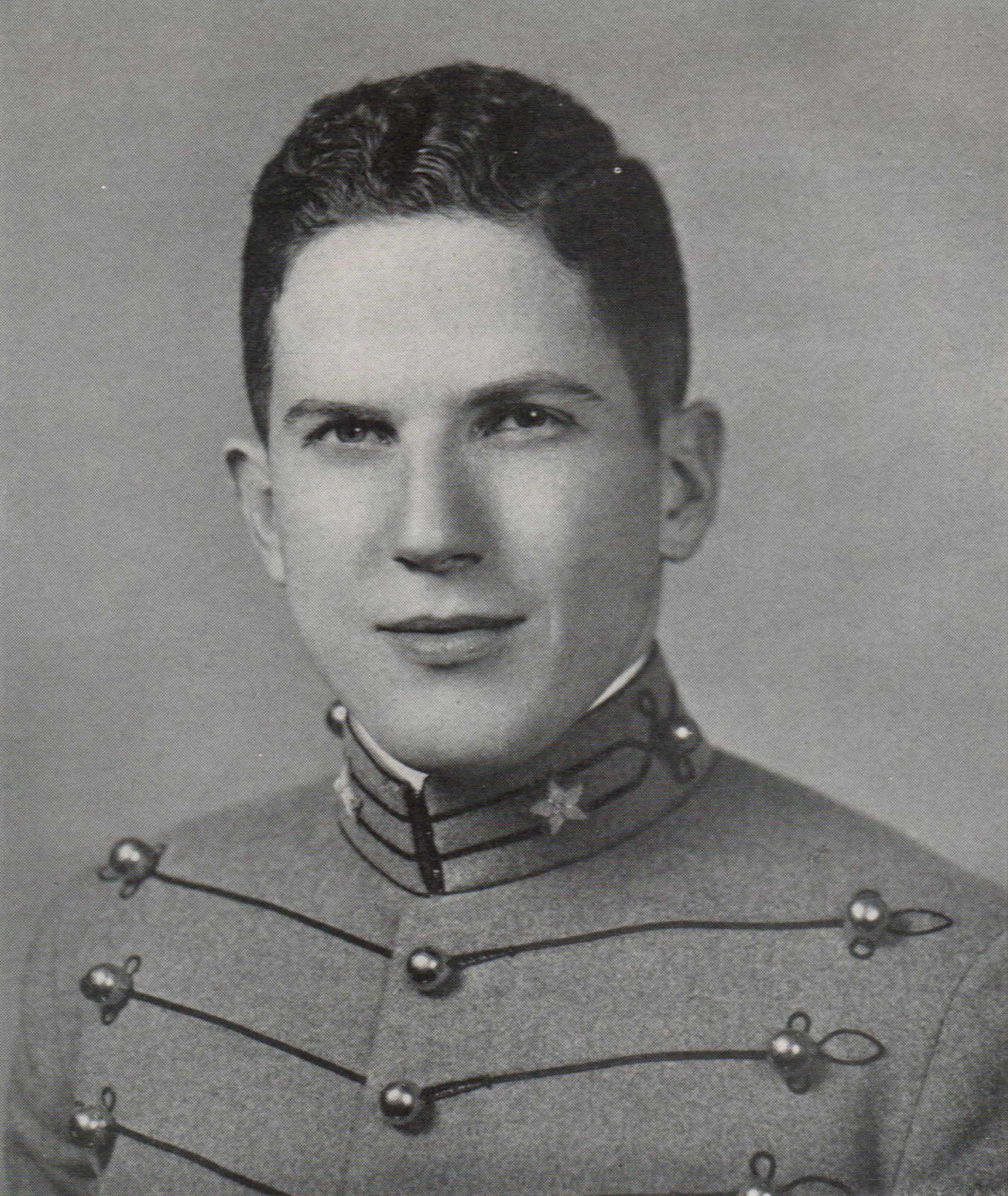
Cushman as a United States Military Academy cadet circa 1944

John Holloway Cushman (October 3, 1921 – November 8, 2017) was a lieutenant general in the United States Army.

Cushman was born in Tianjin, China while his father, Horace Oscar Cushman, was serving in the 15th Infantry.

He was a 1944 graduate of the United States Military Academy. While at West Point, Cushman played for the Army Black Knights men's soccer program, where he was named a second-team All-American in 1943.

In 1963 Colonel Cushman served as adviser to the Army of the Republic of Vietnam 23rd Division in the Mekong Delta.

He commanded the I Corps in the Western sector of Korea's Demilitarized Zone from 1976 to 1978. He also commanded the 101st Airborne Division from 1972 to 1973. He died in Washington D.C from a stroke on November 8, 2017, at age 96

== See also ==
- List of commanders of 101st Airborne Division
