= Gary J. Volesky =

American former lieutenant general

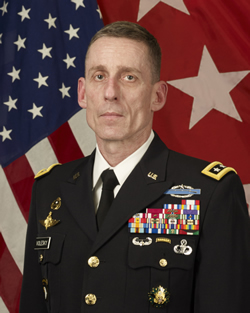
- Lieutenant General Volesky in 2017
- Born: September 7, 1961 (age 65); Spokane, Washington, U.S.
- Military career
- Allegiance: United States
- Branch: United States Army
- Service years: 1983–2020
- Rank: Lieutenant General
- Commands: I Corps; 101st Airborne Division; 3rd Brigade Combat Team, 1st Cavalry Division; 2nd Battalion, 5th Cavalry Regiment
- Conflicts: Gulf War; Iraq War; War in Afghanistan; Operation Inherent Resolve
- Awards: Army Distinguished Service Medal; Silver Star; Defense Superior Service Medal; Legion of Merit; Bronze Star Medal (5); Purple Heart

Gary J. Volesky (born September 7, 1961) is a retired United States Army lieutenant general who commanded I Corps from 2017 to 2020. He previously served as commander of the 101st Airborne Division and commander of the American ground forces in Iraq as part of Combined Joint Task Force – Operation Inherent Resolve. Volesky retired in February 2020, being succeeded by Lieutenant General Randy George as commander of I Corps.

== Biography ==
From Spokane, Washington, Volesky graduated from Ferris High School in 1979. In 1983, he earned a bachelor's degree in military science from Eastern Washington University. He followed this with a master's degree in Near and Middle Eastern Studies from Princeton University. He graduated from the United States Army Command and General Staff College at Fort Leavenworth, Kansas, and earned another master's degree at the Air War College at Maxwell Air Force Base, Alabama.

Volesky served in the Gulf War, Iraq War and War in Afghanistan. He earned the Silver Star for his actions on 4 April 2004 – later known as "Black Sunday" – that began the Siege of Sadr City.

Volesky served as the U.S. Army's Chief of Public Affairs in Washington, D.C., prior to being appointed commander of the 101st Airborne Division in June 2014. In 2015, he was deployed with the 101st to Liberia to help the U.S. Agency for International Development (USAID) with the ebola crisis by building treatment facilities and to train aid workers. He later served as commander of the American ground forces in Iraq as part of Combined Joint Task Force – Operation Inherent Resolve.

Volesky replaced Lieutenant General Stephen Lanza as commander of I Corps on 3 April 2017. He retired in February 2020, after Lieutenant General Randy George succeeded him as I Corps commander.

== Controversial Statements ==
On July 9, 2022, the US Army suspended Volesky from a lucrative consultant’s role after a social media post appearing under his name taunted first lady Jill Biden's support of abortion rights. In response to the U.S. Supreme Court's overturning of Roe v. Wade, First Lady Jill Biden tweeted, “For nearly 50 years, women have had the right to make our own decisions about our bodies. Today, that right was stolen from us.” An account under Volesky’s name replied: “Glad to see you finally know what a woman is.” Volesky had previously responded to a tweet by Rep. Liz Cheney stating the United States House Select Committee on the January 6 Attack was "all about partisan politics".

== Awards and decorations ==
Combat Infantryman Badge with Star (denoting 2nd award)
Ranger Tab
Master Parachutist Badge
Air Assault Badge
Army Staff Identification Badge
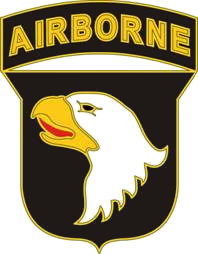
101st Airborne Division Combat Service Identification Badge
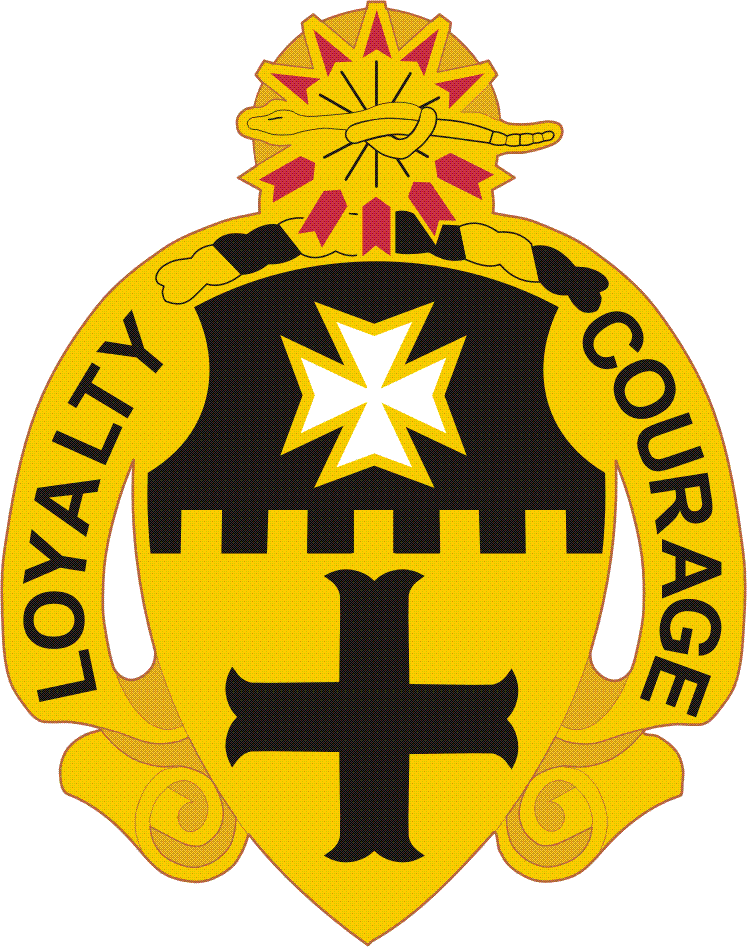
5th Cavalry Regiment Distinctive Unit Insignia
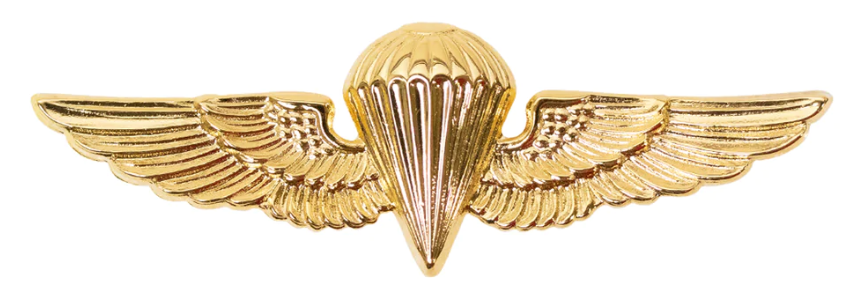
Honduras Parachutist Badge
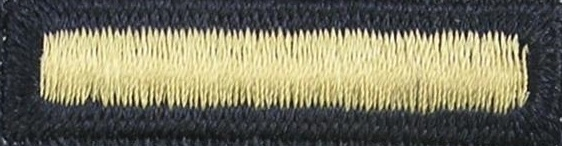
? Overseas Service Bars

Army Distinguished Service Medal
Silver Star
Defense Superior Service Medal
Legion of Merit
Bronze Star Medal with four bronze oak leaf clusters
Purple Heart
Defense Meritorious Service Medal with oak leaf cluster
Meritorious Service Medal with oak leaf cluster
Army Commendation Medal with four oak leaf clusters
Army Achievement Medal with oak leaf cluster
National Defense Service Medal with one bronze service star
Southwest Asia Service Medal with three service stars
Afghanistan Campaign Medal with two service stars
Iraq Campaign Medal with three service stars
Inherent Resolve Campaign Medal
Global War on Terrorism Expeditionary Medal
Global War on Terrorism Service Medal
Army Service Ribbon
Army Overseas Service Ribbon with bronze award numeral 5
NATO Medal for service with ISAF
Kuwait Liberation Medal (Saudi Arabia)
Kuwait Liberation Medal (Kuwait)

== Depictions in media ==
Volesky is portrayed by Michael Kelly in the National Geographic mini-series The Long Road Home.

Military offices
Preceded by Stephen Lanza	Commander I Corps; 2017–2020	Succeeded by Randy A. George
