= John E. Miller (general) =

United States Army general

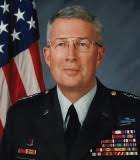
- Born: May 8, 1941 (age 85); Paragould, Arkansas, U.S.
- Military career
- Allegiance: United States
- Branch: United States Army
- Service years: 1963–1997
- Rank: Lieutenant General
- Commands: United States Army Command and General Staff College; 101st Airborne Division
- Conflicts: Vietnam War
- Awards: Army Distinguished Service Medal (2); Silver Star; Legion of Merit (3); Soldier's Medal; Bronze Star Medal (3); Purple Heart

John Edward Miller (born May 8, 1941) is a retired lieutenant general of the United States Army. He was Commandant of the United States Army Command and General Staff College from July 27, 1993, to July 19, 1995.

Miller served two tours in Vietnam; the first as a Commander, Company B, 2nd Battalion (Airborne), 327th Infantry, 1st Brigade, 101st Airborne Division and the second as the District Senior Advisor, Advisory Team 68, Delta Regional Assistance Command, Tam Bình District, Vĩnh Long Province, Republic of Vietnam.

Miller holds a Bachelor of Science degree in mathematics from Southwest Missouri State University (now Missouri State University) and a Master of Science in Operational Research Analysis from Georgia Institute of Technology. He has completed executive development courses at Yale University, The Center for Creative Leadership and the Menninger Foundation.

Miller's awards and decorations include the Army Distinguished Service Medal with oak leaf cluster, the Silver Star, the Legion of Merit with two oak leaf clusters, Soldier's Medal, Bronze Star Medal with "V" device and two oak leaf clusters, Purple Heart, Meritorious Service Medal with two oak leaf clusters, Air Medal with “V” Device and Numeral 2, Army Commendation Medal, the Army Achievement Medal, the Combat Infantryman Badge, the Parachutist Badge, the Air Assault Badge, and the Army Staff Identification Badge.
