= List of United States Army lieutenant generals from 2000 to 2009 =

Flag of an Army lieutenant general

The rank of lieutenant general (or three-star general) is the second-highest rank normally achievable in the United States Army, and the first to have a specified number of appointments set by statute. It ranks above major general (two-star general) and below general (four-star general).

There have been 131 lieutenant generals in the U.S. Army from 2000 to 2009, 27 of whom were promoted to four-star general. All 131 achieved that rank while on active duty in the U.S. Army. Lieutenant generals entered the Army via several paths: 57 were commissioned via the U.S. Military Academy (USMA), 53 via Reserve Officers' Training Corps (ROTC) at a civilian university, 13 via Officer Candidate School (OCS), seven via ROTC at a senior military college, and one via direct commission (direct).

== List of generals ==
Entries in the following list of lieutenant generals are indexed by the numerical order in which each officer was promoted to that rank while on active duty, or by an asterisk (*) if the officer did not serve in that rank while on active duty in the U.S. Army or was promoted to four-star rank while on active duty in the U.S. Army. Each entry lists the general's name, date of rank, (Note: Dates of rank are taken, where available, from the U.S. Army register of active and retired commissioned officers, relevant U.S. Army-affiliated websites and the National Guard Senior Leader Management Office. The date listed is that of the officer's first promotion to lieutenant general. If such a date cannot be found, the next date substituted should be that of the officer's assumption of his/her first three-star appointment. Failing which, the officer's first Senate confirmation date to lieutenant general should be substituted. For officers promoted to lieutenant general on the same date, they should be organized first by date of promotion to four-star rank, and then by the tier of their first listed assignment upon promotion to lieutenant general.) active-duty positions held while serving at three-star rank, (Note: Positions listed are those held by the officer when promoted to lieutenant general. Dates listed are for the officer's full tenure, which may predate promotion to three-star rank or postdate retirement from active duty. Positions held in an acting capacity are italicized.) number of years of active-duty service at three-star rank (Yrs), (Note: The number of years of active-duty service at three-star rank is approximated by subtracting the year in the "Date of rank" column from the last year in the "Position" column. Time spent between active-duty three-star assignments is not counted.) year commissioned and source of commission, (Note: Sources of commission are listed in parentheses after the year of commission and include: the United States Military Academy (USMA); Reserve Officer Training Corps (ROTC) at a civilian university; ROTC at a senior military college such as the Virginia Military Institute (VMI), Norwich University (Norwich), Pennsylvania Military College (PMC), University of North Georgia (UNG), or Widener University (Widener); Officer Candidate School (OCS); the Army National Guard (ARNG); and direct commission (direct).) number of years in commission when promoted to three-star rank (YC), (Note: The number of years in commission before being promoted to three-star rank is approximated by subtracting the year in the "Commission" column from the year in the "Date of rank" column.) and other biographical notes. (Note: Notes include years of birth and death; awards of the Medal of Honor, Congressional Gold Medal, Presidential Medal of Freedom, or honors of similar significance; major government appointments; university presidencies or equivalents; familial relationships with significant military officers or government officials such as U.S. Presidents, cabinet secretaries, U.S. Senators, or state governors; and unusual career events such as premature relief or death in office.)

List of U.S. Army lieutenant generals from 2000 to 2009
#	Name	Photo	Date of rank	Position	Yrs	Commission	YC	Notes
1	Timothy J. Maude		16 May 2000	Deputy Chief of Staff, Personnel, Army Staff (DCSPER), 2000–2001.	1	1967 (OCS)	33	(1947–2001) Killed in action. Highest-ranking officer killed in the September 11 attacks.
2	Peter M. Cuviello		27 Jun 2000	Army Chief Information Officer/G-6/Director, Information Systems for Command, Control, Communications and Computers (CIO/G-6/DISC4), 2000–2003.	3	1969 (ROTC)	31	
3	Paul T. Mikolashek		29 Jun 2000	Commanding General, Third U.S. Army/Commanding General, U.S. Army Forces Central Command (CG TUSA/CG USARCENT), 2000–2002.; Inspector General, U.S. Army (IG), 2002–2005.	4	1969 (ROTC)	31	(1947– )
4	Robert W. Noonan Jr.		17 Jul 2000	Deputy Chief of Staff, Intelligence, Army Staff (DCS G-2), 2000–2003.	3	1968 (ROTC)	32	
*	Dan K. McNeill		20 Jul 2000	Commanding General, XVIII Airborne Corps, 2000–2002.; Commanding General, XVIII Airborne Corps/Commander, Combined Joint Task Force–180 (CDRCJTF-180), 2002–2003.; Deputy Commanding General/Chief of Staff, U.S. Army Forces Command (DCG/COFS FORSCOM), 2003–2004.	4	1968 (ROTC)	32	(1946– ) (Note: Served as Commander, International Security Assistance Force (CDRISAF).) Promoted to general, 1 Jul 2004.
5	Freddy E. McFarren		12 Aug 2000	Commanding General, Fifth U.S. Army, 2000–2003.	3	1966 (USMA)	34	(1943– )
6	James B. Peake		7 Sep 2000	Surgeon General, U.S. Army/Commanding General, U.S. Army Medical Command (TSG/CG MEDCOM), 2000–2004.	4	1966 (USMA)	34	(1944– ) U.S. Secretary of Veterans Affairs, 2007–2009.
7	Daniel R. Zanini		28 Sep 2000	Commanding General, Eighth U.S. Army/Chief of Staff, United Nations Command, ROK/U.S. Combined Forces Command and U.S. Forces Korea (CG EUSA/COFS UNC/CFC/USFK), 2000–2002.	2	1966 (OCS)	34	(1946– )
*	John P. Abizaid		2 Oct 2000	Director, Strategic Plans and Policy, Joint Staff, J5/Senior Member, U.S. Delegation to the U.N. Military Staff Committee (Sr. Member MSC), 2000–2001.; Director, Joint Staff (DJS), 2001–2003.; Deputy Commander (Forward), Combined Forces Command, U.S. Central Command (DCDR(F)USCENTCOM), 2003.	3	1973 (USMA)	27	(1951– ) (Note: Served as a combatant commander (CCDR).) Promoted to general, 27 Jun 2003. U.S. Ambassador to Saudi Arabia, 2019–2021. Father of National Counterterrorism Center director Christine Abizaid.
8	Charles S. Mahan Jr.		6 Oct 2000	Deputy Chief of Staff, Logistics, Army Staff (DCS G-4), (Note: Designated as Army G-4 in 2002.) 2000–2003.	3	1968 (USMA)	32	(1946– )
*	Bryan D. Brown		11 Oct 2000	Commanding General, U.S. Army Special Operations Command (CG USASOC), 2000–2002.; Deputy Commander in Chief, U.S. Special Operations Command (DCINCSOC), 2002.; Deputy Commander, U.S. Special Operations Command (DCDRUSSOCOM), 2002–2003.	3	1970 (OCS)	30	(1948– ) Promoted to general, 25 Aug 2003.
9	Robert B. Flowers		23 Oct 2000	U.S. Army Chief of Engineers/Commanding General, U.S. Army Corps of Engineers (CoE/CG USACE), 2000–2004.	4	1969 (VMI)	31	(1947– )
10	Joseph K. Kellogg Jr.		24 Oct 2000	Director, Command, Control, Communications and Computers/Cyber, Joint Staff, J6, 2000–2003.	3	1967 (ROTC)	33	(1944– ) National Security Advisor to the U.S. Vice President, 2018–2021; U.S. Special Envoy for Ukraine, 2025–present.
11	Joseph M. Cosumano Jr.		30 Apr 2001	Commanding General, U.S. Army Space and Missile Defense Command/U.S. Army Space Command (CG USASMDC/ARSPACE), 2001–2002.; Commanding General, U.S. Army Space and Missile Defense Command/U.S. Army Forces Strategic Command (CG USASMDC/ARSTRAT), 2002–2003.	2	1968 (ROTC)	33	(1946– )
12	Roy E. Beauchamp		24 May 2001	Deputy Commanding General, U.S. Army Materiel Command (DCG AMC), 2001–2002.	1	1966 (OCS)	35	(1945– )
13	Roger C. Schultz		24 May 2001	Director, Army National Guard (DIRARNG), 1998–2005.	4	1967 (OCS)	34	(1945– ) First Army National Guard director to achieve the rank of lieutenant general.
14	William J. Lennox Jr.		8 Jun 2001	Superintendent, U.S. Military Academy, 2001–2006.	5	1971 (USMA)	30	(1949– ) President, Saint Leo University, 2015–2018.
15	Thomas J. Plewes		13 Jun 2001	Chief, U.S. Army Reserve/Commanding General, U.S. Army Reserve Command (CAR/CG USARC), 1998–2002.	1	1967 (OCS)	34	(1940– ) First Army Reserve officer to achieve the rank of lieutenant general.
*	Benjamin S. Griffin		29 Jun 2001	Deputy Chief of Staff, Programs, Army Staff (DCS G-8), (Note: Designated as Army G-8 in 2002.) 2001–2004.	3	1970 (OCS)	31	(1946– ) Promoted to general, 5 Nov 2004.
*	William S. Wallace		18 Jul 2001	Commanding General, V Corps, 2001–2003.; Commanding General, U.S. Army Combined Arms Center/Commandant, U.S. Army Command and General Staff College (CG USACAC/CMDT CGSC), 2003–2005.	4	1969 (USMA)	32	(1946– ) Promoted to general, 13 Oct 2005.
*	Burwell B. Bell III		14 Aug 2001	Commanding General, III Corps, 2001–2002.	1	1969 (ROTC)	32	(1947– ) (Note: Served as Commander, U.S. Forces Korea (COMUSFK).) Promoted to general, 3 Dec 2002.
16	John B. Sylvester		7 Sep 2001	Commander, Stabilisation Force in Bosnia and Herzegovina (COMSFOR), 2001–2002.; Chief of Staff, U.S. European Command (COFS USEUCOM), 2002–2004.	3	1968 (OCS)	33	(1946– )
17	Colby M. Broadwater III		26 Sep 2001	Deputy Commanding General, Joint Headquarters Center/Commanding General, U.S. Army NATO (DCG JFHQCENT/CG USANATO), 2001–2004.; Chief of Staff, U.S. European Command (COFS USEUCOM), 2004–2006.	5	1972 (Citadel)	29	(1950– ) President, American College of the Building Arts, 2008–present.
18	John M. LeMoyne		16 Oct 2001	Deputy Chief of Staff, Personnel, Army Staff (DCS G-1), 2001–2003.	2	1968 (ROTC)	33	(1943– )
19	Joseph R. Inge		16 Oct 2001	Commanding General, First U.S. Army (CG FUSA), 2001–2004.; Deputy Commander, U.S. Northern Command/Vice Commander, U.S. Element, North American Aerospace Defense Command (DCDRUSNORTHCOM/VCDRNORAD), 2004–2007.	6	1969 (Virginia Tech)	32	(1947–2023)
20	John S. Caldwell Jr.		29 Oct 2001	Military Deputy to the Assistant Secretary of the Army for Acquisition, Logistics and Technology/Director, U.S. Army Acquisition Corps (MD(ASA(ALT))/DIRAAC), 2001–2003.	2	1967 (USMA)	34	(1944– )
*	George W. Casey Jr.		31 Oct 2001	Director, Strategic Plans and Policy, Joint Staff, J5/Senior Member, U.S. Delegation to the U.N. Military Staff Committee (Sr. Member MSC), 2001–2003.; Director, Joint Staff (DJS), 2003.	2	1970 (ROTC)	31	(1948– ) (Note: Served as Vice Chief of Staff, U.S. Army (VCSA).) (Note: Served as Commander, Multi-National Force – Iraq (CDRMNF-I).) (Note: Served as Chief of Staff, U.S. Army (CSA).) Promoted to general, 1 Dec 2003.
*	David D. McKiernan		6 Nov 2001	Deputy Chief of Staff, Operations, Army Staff (DCS G-3), 2001–2002.; Commanding General, Third U.S. Army/Commanding General, U.S. Army Forces Central Command/Commanding General, Coalition Forces Land Component Command (CG USARCENT/CG CFLCC), 2002–2004.; Deputy Commanding General/Chief of Staff, U.S. Army Forces Command (DCG/COFS FORSCOM), 2004–2005.	4	1972 (ROTC)	29	(1950– ) Promoted to general, 14 Dec 2005.
21	Dennis D. Cavin		16 Jan 2002	Deputy Commanding General, Initial Entry Training, U.S. Army Training and Doctrine Command (DCG-IET TRADOC), 2002.; Commanding General, U.S. Army Accessions Command/Deputy Commanding General, Initial Entry Training, U.S. Army Training and Doctrine Command (CG USAAC/DCG-IET TRADOC), 2002–2004.	2	1970 (ROTC)	32	(1947– )
22	James R. Helmly		29 May 2002	Chief, U.S. Army Reserve/Commanding General, U.S. Army Reserve Command (CAR/CG USARC), 2002–2006.	4	1967 (OCS)	35	(1947– )
*	Richard A. Cody		31 Jul 2002	Deputy Chief of Staff, Operations, Army Staff (DCS G-3), 2002–2004.	2	1972 (USMA)	30	(1950– ) Promoted to general, 24 Jun 2004.
23	Edward Soriano		12 Aug 2002	Commanding General, I Corps, 2002–2004.	2	1970 (ROTC)	32	(1946– ) First Filipino-American promoted to general officer rank.
*	Bantz J. Craddock		21 Aug 2002	Senior Military Assistant to the Secretary of Defense (SMA SecDef), 2002–2004.	3	1971 (ROTC)	31	(1949– ) (Note: Served as Supreme Allied Commander Europe (SACEUR).) Promoted to general, 1 Jan 2005.
24	Philip R. Kensinger Jr.		29 Aug 2002	Commanding General, U.S. Army Special Operations Command (CG USASOC), 2002–2005.	3	1970 (USMA)	32	(1949– ) (Note: Retired as lieutenant general, 1 February 2006; retroactively demoted to major general on the retired list, 16 May 2008.)
*	William E. Ward		8 Oct 2002	Commander, Stabilisation Force in Bosnia and Herzegovina (COMSFOR), 2002–2003.; Deputy Commanding General/Chief of Staff, U.S. Army Europe and Seventh Army (DCG/COFS USAREUR), 2003–2005.; Deputy Commanding General/Chief of Staff, U.S. Army Europe and Seventh Army/U.S. Security Coordinator for Israel and the Palestinian National Authority (DCG/COFS USAREUR/USSC), 2005.; Deputy Commanding General/Chief of Staff, U.S. Army Europe and Seventh Army (DCG/COFS USAREUR), 2005–2006.	4	1971 (ROTC)	31	(1949– ) (Note: Retired as lieutenant general, Nov 2012.) Promoted to general, 3 May 2006.
25	Richard A. Hack		21 Oct 2002	Deputy Commanding General, U.S. Army Materiel Command/Acting Chief of Staff, U.S. Army Materiel Command (DCG/COFS AMC), 2002–2005.	3	1972 (VMI)	30	(1950– )
26	James L. Campbell		4 Nov 2002	Commanding General, U.S. Army Pacific (CG USARPAC), 2002–2004.; Director, Army Staff (DAS), 2004–2008.	6	1971 (ROTC)	31	(1949– )
*	Charles C. Campbell		5 Nov 2002	Commanding General, Eighth U.S. Army/Chief of Staff, United Nations Command, ROK/U.S. Combined Forces Command and U.S. Forces Korea (CG EUSA/COFS UNC/CFC/USFK), 2002–2006.; Deputy Commanding General/Chief of Staff, U.S. Army Forces Command (DCG/COFS FORSCOM), 2006–2007.	5	1970 (ROTC)	32	(1948–2016) Promoted to general, 9 Jan 2007.
27	Robert W. Wagner		Jan 2003	Deputy Commander, U.S. Joint Forces Command (DCDRUSJFCOM), 2003–2005.; Commanding General, U.S. Army Special Operations Command (CG USASOC), 2005–2008.	5	1970 (USMA)	33	
28	Thomas F. Metz		7 Feb 2003	Commanding General, III Corps, 2003–2005.; Deputy Commanding General/Chief of Staff, U.S. Army Training and Doctrine Command (DCG/COFS TRADOC), 2005–2007.; Director, Joint Improvised Explosive Device Defeat Organization (DIRJIEDDO), 2007–2009.	6	1971 (USMA)	32	(1948– )
*	Walter L. Sharp		10 Mar 2003	Director, Strategic Plans and Policy, Joint Staff, J5/Senior Member, U.S. Delegation to the U.N. Military Staff Committee (Sr. Member MSC), 2003–2005.; Director, Joint Staff (DJS), 2005–2008.	5	1974 (USMA)	29	(1952– ) Promoted to general, 2 Jun 2008.
29	H. Steven Blum		13 Apr 2003	Chief, National Guard Bureau (CNGB), 2003–2008. (Note: Confirmed for a two-year extension of statutory term as CNGB pending confirmation of a successor to four-star rank.); Deputy Commander, U.S. Northern Command/Vice Commander, U.S. Element, North American Aerospace Defense Command (DCDRUSNORTHCOM/VCDRNORAD), 2009–2010.	6	1971 (OCS)	32	(1946– )
30	Jerry L. Sinn		23 May 2003	Military Deputy for Budget to the Assistant Secretary of the Army (Financial Management and Comptroller) (MILDEP ASA(FM&C)), 2003–2006.	3	1969 (USMA)	34	
31	Anthony R. Jones		6 Jun 2003	Deputy Commanding General/Chief of Staff, U.S. Army Training and Doctrine Command (DCG/COFS TRADOC), 2003–2005.; Commanding General, U.S. Army Training and Doctrine Command (CG TRADOC), 2005.	2	1970 (ROTC)	33	(1948– )
32	Ricardo S. Sanchez		14 Jun 2003	Commander, Multi-National Force – Iraq/Commanding General, V Corps (CDRMNF–I), 2003–2004.; Commanding General, V Corps, 2004–2006.	3	1973 (ROTC)	30	(1953– )
33	James J. Lovelace Jr.		22 Jun 2003	Director, Army Staff (DAS), 2003–2004.; Deputy Chief of Staff, Operations, Army Staff (DCS G-3), 2004–2005.; Deputy Chief of Staff, Operations, Plans and Training, Army Staff (DCS G-3/5/7), 2005–2007.; Commanding General, Third U.S. Army/Commanding General, U.S. Army Forces Central Command/Commanding General, Coalition Forces Land Component Command (CG TUSA/CG USARCENT/CG CFLCC), 2007–2008.; Commanding General, U.S. Army Central/Commanding General, Coalition Forces Land Component Command (CG USARCENT/CG CFLCC), 2008–2009.	6	1970 (USMA)	33	(1948–2024)
34	William G. Boykin		27 Jun 2003	Deputy Under Secretary of Defense for Intelligence, 2003–2007.	4	1971 (Virginia Tech)	32	(1948– )
35	Claude V. Christianson		Jul 2003	Deputy Chief of Staff, Logistics, Army Staff (DCS G-4), 2003–2005.; Director, Logistics, Joint Staff, J4, 2005–2008.	5	1971 (ROTC)	32	
*	Keith B. Alexander		1 Aug 2003	Deputy Chief of Staff, Intelligence, Army Staff (DCS G-2), 2003–2005.; Director, National Security Agency/Chief, Central Security Service (DIRNSA/CCSS), 2005–2014.	7	1974 (USMA)	29	(1952– ) Promoted to general, 21 May 2010. Commander, U.S. Cyber Command, 2010–2014.
36	John R. Vines		26 Aug 2003	Commanding General, XVIII Airborne Corps, 2003–2005.; Commander, Multi-National Corps – Iraq/Commanding General, XVIII Airborne Corps (CDRMNC-I), 2005–2006.	3	1971 (ROTC)	32	(1949– )
37	Steven W. Boutelle		27 Aug 2003	Army Chief Information Officer/G-6 (CIO/G-6), 2003–2007.	4	1970 (OCS)	33	
38	Franklin L. Hagenbeck		8 Nov 2003	Deputy Chief of Staff, Personnel, Army Staff (DCS G-1), 2003–2006.; Superintendent, U.S. Military Academy, 2006–2010.	7	1971 (USMA)	32	(1949– )
39	David W. Barno		18 Nov 2003	Commander, Military Operations – Afghanistan (CDRMILOP–A), 2003–2004.; Commander, Combined Forces Command – Afghanistan (CDRCFC-A), 2004–2005.; Assistant Chief of Staff, Installation Management, Army Staff (ACSIM), 2005–2006.	3	1976 (USMA)	27	(1954– ) Director, Near East South Asia Center for Strategic Studies, 2006–2010.
40	Joseph L. Yakovac Jr.		18 Nov 2003	Military Deputy to the Assistant Secretary of the Army for Acquisition, Logistics and Technology/Director, U.S. Army Acquisition Corps (MD(ASA(ALT))/DIRAAC), 2003–2006.	3	1971 (USMA)	32	(1949– )
41	Robert T. Clark		5 Dec 2003	Commanding General, Fifth U.S. Army, 2003–2004.; Commanding General, U.S. Army North (CG ARNORTH), 2004–2006.	3	1970 (ROTC)	33	(1948– )
42	John M. Curran		12 Dec 2003	Deputy Commanding General, Futures, U.S. Army Training and Doctrine Command/Director, Futures Center (DCG-F TRADOC/DIRFC), 2003–2006.; Deputy Commanding General, Futures, U.S. Army Training and Doctrine Command/Director, U.S. Army Capabilities Integration Center (DCG-F TRADOC/DIRARCIC), 2006–2007.	4	1974 (ROTC)	29	
43	Larry J. Dodgen		16 Dec 2003	Commanding General, U.S. Army Space and Missile Defense Command/U.S. Army Forces Strategic Command (CG USASMDC/ARSTRAT), 2003–2005.; Commanding General, U.S. Army Space and Missile Defense Command/U.S. Army Forces Strategic Command/Commander, Joint Functional Component Command for Integrated Missile Defense (CG USASMDC/ARSTRAT/CDRJFCC IMD), 2005–2006.	3	1972 (ROTC)	31	(1949–2010)
*	David H. Petraeus		18 May 2004	Commander, Office of Security Transition (CDROST), 2004.; Commander, Multi-National Security Transition Command – Iraq (CDRMNSTC-I), 2004.; Commander, Multi-National Security Transition Command – Iraq/Commander, NATO Training Mission – Iraq (CDRMNSTC-I/CDRNTM-I), 2004–2005.; Commanding General, U.S. Army Combined Arms Center/Commandant, U.S. Army Command and General Staff College (CG USACAC/CMDT CGSC), 2005–2007.	3	1974 (USMA)	30	(1952– ) Promoted to general, 10 Feb 2007. Director, Central Intelligence Agency, 2011–2012. Son-in-law of Army four-star general William A. Knowlton.
44	Carl A. Strock		1 Jul 2004	U.S. Army Chief of Engineers/Commanding General, U.S. Army Corps of Engineers (CoE/CG USACE), 2004–2007.	3	1972 (OCS)	32	(1948– )
45	Russel L. Honoré		15 Jul 2004	Commanding General, First U.S. Army (CG FUSA), 2004–2005.; Commanding General, First U.S. Army/Commander, Joint Task Force - Katrina (CG FUSA/CDRJTF-Katrina), 2005.; Commanding General, First U.S. Army (CG FUSA), 2005–2006.; Commanding General, First Army, 2006–2008.	4	1971 (ROTC)	33	(1947– )
46	John M. Brown III		25 Aug 2004	Commanding General, U.S. Army Pacific (CG USARPAC), 2004–2008.	4	1971 (OCS)	33	(c. 1947– )
47	Robert T. Dail		30 Sep 2004	Deputy Commander, U.S. Transportation Command (DCDRUSTRANSCOM), 2004–2006.; Director, Defense Logistics Agency (DIRDLA), 2006–2008.	4	1975 (ROTC)	29	(1953– )
48	David F. Melcher		30 Sep 2004	Deputy Chief of Staff, Programs, Army Staff (DCS G-8), 2004–2006.; Military Deputy for Budget to the Assistant Secretary of the Army (Financial Management and Comptroller) (MILDEP ASA(FM&C)), 2006–2008.	4	1976 (USMA)	32	(1954– )
49	Kevin C. Kiley		30 Sep 2004	Surgeon General, U.S. Army/Commanding General, U.S. Army Medical Command (TSG/CG MEDCOM), 2004–2007.	3	1976 (ROTC)	28	(1950– ) (Note: Relieved, March 2007, and retired as major general.)
50	R. Steven Whitcomb		13 Oct 2004	Commanding General, Third U.S. Army/Commanding General, Coalition Forces Land Component Command (CG TUSA/CG CFLCC), 2004–2007.; Inspector General, U.S. Army (IG), 2008–2010.	5	1970 (ROTC)	34	(1948– )
51	James M. Dubik		3 Nov 2004	Commanding General, I Corps, 2004–2007.; Commander, Multi-National Security Transition Command – Iraq/Commander, NATO Training Mission – Iraq (CDRMNSTC-I/CDRNTM-I), 2007–2008.	4	1971 (ROTC)	33	(1949– )
52	Robert L. Van Antwerp Jr.		21 Nov 2004	Commanding General, U.S. Army Accessions Command/Deputy Commanding General, Initial Entry Training, U.S. Army Training and Doctrine Command (CG USAAC/DCG-IET TRADOC), 2004–2006.; Commanding General, U.S. Army Accessions Command/Deputy Commanding General, Initial Military Training, U.S. Army Training and Doctrine Command (CG USAAC/DCG-IMT TRADOC), 2006–2007.; U.S. Army Chief of Engineers/Commanding General, U.S. Army Corps of Engineers (CoE/CG USACE), 2007–2011.	7	1972 (USMA)	32	(1950– )
*	Raymond T. Odierno		1 Jan 2005	Assistant to the Chairman of the Joint Chiefs of Staff (ACJCS), 2004–2006.; Commanding General, III Corps, 2006.; Commander, Multi-National Corps – Iraq/Commanding General, III Corps (CDRMNC-I), 2006–2008.; Commanding General, III Corps, 2008.	3	1976 (USMA)	29	(1954–2021) Promoted to general, 16 Sep 2008.
53	Stanley E. Green		17 Mar 2005	Inspector General, U.S. Army (IG), 2005–2008.	3	1971 (OCS)	34	(1947– )
54	Dell L. Dailey		28 Apr 2005	Director, Center for Special Operations, U.S. Special Operations Command (DIRSCSO), 2004–2007.	2	1971 (USMA)	34	(1949– ) U.S. Coordinator for Counterterrorism, 2007–2009.
55	Karl W. Eikenberry		4 May 2005	Commander, Combined Forces Command – Afghanistan (CDRCFC-A), 2005–2007.; Deputy Chairman, NATO Military Committee (DCMC), 2007–2009.	4	1973 (USMA)	32	(1951– ) U.S. Ambassador to Afghanistan, 2009–2011.
56	Clyde A. Vaughn		15 Jun 2005	Director, Army National Guard (DIRARNG), 2005–2009.	4	1974 (OCS)	31	(1946– )
57	Ronald L. Burgess Jr.		Aug 2005	Deputy Director of National Intelligence, Customer Outcomes (DDNVCO), 2005–2007.; Principal Deputy Director of National Intelligence (PDDNI), 2006–2007.; Director, Intelligence Staff (DIS), 2007–2009.; Principal Deputy Director of National Intelligence (PDDNI), 2009.; Director, Defense Intelligence Agency/Commander, Joint Functional Component Command for Intelligence, Surveillance and Reconnaissance (DIRDIA/CDRJFCC ISR), 2009–2012.	7	1974 (ROTC)	31	(1952– ) Chief Operating Officer, Auburn University, 2018–2019; Executive Vice President, Auburn University, 2019–2023.
58	William E. Mortensen		2 Sep 2005	Deputy Commanding General/Chief of Staff, U.S. Army Materiel Command (DCG/COFS AMC), 2005–2008.	3	1973 (ROTC)	32	(c. 1952– )
*	Martin E. Dempsey		8 Sep 2005	Commander, Multi-National Security Transition Command – Iraq/Commander, NATO Training Mission – Iraq (CDRMNSTC-I/CDRNTM-I), 2005–2007.; Deputy Commander, U.S. Central Command (DCDRUSCENTCOM), 2007–2008.; Commander, U.S. Central Command (CDRUSCENTCOM), 2008.	3	1974 (USMA)	31	(1952– ) (Note: Served as Chairman, Joint Chiefs of Staff (CJCS).) Promoted to general, 8 Dec 2008.
*	Ann E. Dunwoody		30 Sep 2005	Deputy Chief of Staff, Logistics, Army Staff (DCS G-4), 2005–2008.; Deputy Commanding General/Chief of Staff, U.S. Army Materiel Command (DCG/COFS AMC), 2008.	3	1975 (direct)	30	(1953– ) Promoted to general, 14 Nov 2008.
59	John F. Kimmons		21 Oct 2005	Deputy Chief of Staff, Intelligence, Army Staff (DCS G-2), 2005–2009.; Director, Intelligence Staff (DIS), 2009–2010.	5	1974 (Citadel)	31	(c. 1952– )
60	John R. Wood		18 Nov 2005	Deputy Commander, U.S. Joint Forces Command (DCDRUSJFCOM), 2005–2008.	3	1972 (USMA)	33	
61	Keith W. Dayton		18 Nov 2005	U.S. Security Coordinator for Israel and the Palestinian National Authority (USSC), 2005–2010.	5	1970 (ROTC)	35	(1949– ) (Note: Nomination as U.S. Ambassador to Ukraine returned to the President, 2021.) Director, George C. Marshall European Center for Security Studies, 2011–2021.
62	Michael D. Maples		29 Nov 2005	Director, Defense Intelligence Agency/Commander, Joint Functional Component Command for Intelligence, Surveillance and Reconnaissance (DIRDIA/CDRJFCC ISR), 2005–2009.	4	1971 (USMA)	34	(1949– )
*	Peter W. Chiarelli		19 Jan 2006	Commander, Multi-National Corps – Iraq (CDRMNC-I), 2006. (Note: Did not formally take command of V Corps as planned from Ricardo Sanchez due to being investigated for wrongful government expenditures under the Antideficiency Act.); Special Assistant to the Commander, U.S. Central Command, 2006–2007.; Senior Military Assistant to the Secretary of Defense (SMA SecDef), 2007–2008.	2	1972 (ROTC)	34	(1950– ) Promoted to general, 4 Aug 2008.
*	Stanley A. McChrystal		16 Feb 2006	Commander, Joint Special Operations Command/Commander, Joint Special Operations Command Forward, U.S. Special Operations Command (CDRJSOC/CDRJSOC-F), 2006–2008.; Director, Joint Staff (DJS), 2008–2009.	3	1976 (USMA)	30	(1954– ) Promoted to general, 15 Jun 2009.
63	Gary D. Speer		3 Apr 2006	Deputy Commanding General/Chief of Staff, U.S. Army Europe and Seventh Army (DCG/COFS USAREUR), 2006–2008.; Commanding General, U.S. Army Europe and Seventh Army/Commanding General, U.S. Army NATO (CG USAREUR/CG USANATO), 2008.; Deputy Commanding General/Chief of Staff, U.S. Army Europe and Seventh Army (DCG/COFS USAREUR), 2008–2009.	3	1972 (USMA)	34	
64	David P. Valcourt		11 Apr 2006	Commanding General, Eighth U.S. Army/Chief of Staff, ROK/U.S. Combined Forces Command (CG EUSA/COFS CFC), 2006–2008.; Deputy Commanding General/Chief of Staff, U.S. Army Training and Doctrine Command (DCG/COFS TRADOC), 2008–2010.	4	1973 (USMA)	33	(1951– )
65	Jack C. Stultz Jr.		25 May 2006	Chief, U.S. Army Reserve/Commanding General, U.S. Army Reserve Command (CAR/CG USARC), 2006–2012.	6	1974 (ROTC)	32	(1952– )
66	Michael D. Rochelle		Jun 2006	Deputy Chief of Staff, Personnel, Army Staff (DCS G-1), 2006–2009.	3	1972 (ROTC)	34	(1950– )
67	Robert Wilson		23 Jun 2006	Assistant Chief of Staff, Installation Management, Army Staff (ACSIM), 2006.; Assistant Chief of Staff, Installation Management, Army Staff/Commanding General, U.S. Army Installation Management Command (ACSIM/CG IMCOM), 2006–2009.	3	1972 (ROTC)	34	
68	Douglas E. Lute		21 Jul 2006	Director, Operations, Joint Staff, J3, 2006–2007.; Deputy National Security Advisor for Iraq and Afghanistan, 2007–2013. (Note: While holding this position, Lute also held the formal rank of Assistant to the President as a senior staffer within the Executive Office of the President. He remained in this capacity as a civilian after his retirement from active duty from 2010 to 2013.)	4	1975 (USMA)	31	(1952– ) U.S. Permanent Representative to NATO, 2013–2017. Husband of U.S. Deputy Secretary of Homeland Security Jane Holl Lute.
69	N. Ross Thompson III		1 Sep 2006	Military Deputy to the Assistant Secretary of the Army for Acquisition, Logistics and Technology/Director, U.S. Army Acquisition Corps (MD(ASA(ALT))/DIRAAC), 2006–2008.; Principal Military Deputy to the Assistant Secretary of the Army for Acquisition, Logistics and Technology/Director, U.S. Army Acquisition Corps (PMD(ASA(ALT))/DIRAAC), 2008–2010.	4	1974 (ROTC)	32	Son of Army lieutenant general N. Ross Thompson Jr.
70	Thomas R. Turner II		4 Dec 2006	Commanding General, U.S. Army North (CG ARNORTH), 2006–2009.	3	1974 (USMA)	32	(1955– )
*	Lloyd J. Austin III		8 Dec 2006	Commanding General, XVIII Airborne Corps, 2006–2008.; Commander, Multi-National Corps – Iraq/Commanding General, XVIII Airborne Corps (CDRMNC-I), 2008–2009.; Director, Joint Staff (DJS), 2009–2010.	4	1975 (USMA)	31	(1953– ) (Note: Served as Commanding General, U.S. Forces – Iraq (CG USF-I).) Promoted to general, 1 Sep 2010. U.S. Secretary of Defense, 2021–2025.
71	Stephen M. Speakes		9 Dec 2006	Deputy Chief of Staff, Programs, Army Staff (DCS G-8), 2006–2009.	3	1974 (USMA)	32	(1952– )
72	Joseph F. Peterson		11 Dec 2006	Deputy Commanding General/Chief of Staff, U.S. Army Forces Command (DCG/COFS FORSCOM), 2006–2010.	4	1972 (ROTC)	34	(c. 1954– ) First Hawaiian-American to attain the rank of lieutenant general in the Army.
73	Kevin T. Campbell		18 Dec 2006	Commanding General, U.S. Army Space and Missile Defense Command/U.S. Army Forces Strategic Command/Commander, Joint Functional Component Command for Integrated Missile Defense (CG USASMDC/ARSTRAT/CDRJFCC IMD), 2006–2010.	4	1973 (ROTC)	33	(1950– )
*	James D. Thurman		19 Jan 2007	Commanding General, V Corps, 2007.; Deputy Chief of Staff, Operations, Plans and Training, Army Staff (DCS G-3/5/7), 2007–2010.	3	1975 (ROTC)	32	(1953– ) Promoted to general, 3 Jun 2010.
74	Benjamin C. Freakley		18 May 2007	Commanding General, U.S. Army Accessions Command (CG USAAC), 2007–2012.	5	1975 (USMA)	32	(1953– )
75	William G. Webster Jr.		29 May 2007	Deputy Commander, U.S. Northern Command/Vice Commander, U.S. Element, North American Aerospace Defense Command (DCDRUSNORTHCOM/VCDRNORAD), 2007–2009.; Commanding General, U.S. Army Central/Commanding General, Coalition Forces Land Component Command (CG USARCENT/CG CFLCC), 2009–2011.	4	1974 (USMA)	33	(1951– )
*	Charles H. Jacoby Jr.		31 May 2007	Commanding General, I Corps, 2007–2009.; Commander, Multi-National Corps – Iraq/Commanding General, I Corps (CDRMNC-I), 2009–2010.; Director, Strategic Plans and Policy, Joint Staff, J5/Senior Member, U.S. Delegation to the U.N. Military Staff Committee (Sr. Member MSC), 2010–2011.	4	1978 (USMA)	29	(1954– ) (Note: Served as Commander, North American Aerospace Defense Command (CDRNORAD).) Promoted to general, 3 Aug 2011.
76	William B. Caldwell IV		11 Jun 2007	Commanding General, U.S. Army Combined Arms Center/Commandant, U.S. Army Command and General Staff College/Deputy Commanding General, Combined Arms, U.S. Army Training and Doctrine Command/Director, Joint Center for International Security Force Assistance (CG USACAC/CMDT CGSC/DCG-CA TRADOC/DIRJCISFA), 2007–2009.; Commander, NATO Training Mission-Afghanistan/Commander, Combined Security Transition Command-Afghanistan (CDRNTM-A/CDRCSTC-A), 2009–2011.; Commanding General, U.S. Army North (CG ARNORTH), 2012–2013.	6	1976 (USMA)	31	(1954– ) President, Georgia Military College, 2013–present. Son of Army lieutenant general William B. Caldwell III.
77	Richard P. Zahner		28 Jun 2007	Deputy Under Secretary of Defense (Intelligence and Warfighting Support) (DUSD(I&WS)), 2007–2009.; Deputy Chief of Staff, Intelligence, Army Staff (DCS G-2), 2009–2012.	5	1976 (ROTC)	31	
78	Francis H. Kearney III		28 Jun 2007	Deputy Commander, U.S. Special Operations Command (DCDRUSSOCOM), 2007–2010.; Deputy Director, Strategic Operational Planning, National Counterterrorism Center, 2010–2011.	4	1976 (USMA)	31	(1954– )
79	David P. Fridovich		8 Jul 2007	Director, Center for Special Operations, U.S. Special Operations Command (DIRSCSO), 2007–2010.; Deputy Commander, U.S. Special Operations Command (DCDRUSSOCOM), 2010–2011.	4	1974 (ROTC)	33	
80	John D. Gardner		11 Jul 2007	Deputy Commander, Allied Land Component Command - Heidelberg (DCDRALCC - Heidelberg), 2007–2009.; Deputy Commander, U.S. European Command (DCDRUSEUCOM), 2009–2012.	5	1976 (USMA)	31	
*	Carter F. Ham		6 Aug 2007	Director, Operations, Joint Staff, J3, 2007–2008.	1	1976 (ROTC)	31	(1952– ) Promoted to general, 28 Aug 2008.
81	Kenneth W. Hunzeker		8 Aug 2007	Commanding General, V Corps, 2007–2009.; Deputy Commander, Multi-National Force – Iraq (DCDRMNF–I), 2009–2010.; Deputy Commanding General, Support, U.S. Forces - Iraq (DCG-S USF-I), 2010.	3	1975 (USMA)	32	(1952– )
82	Michael A. Vane		20 Aug 2007	Deputy Commanding General, Futures, U.S. Army Training and Doctrine Command/Director, U.S. Army Capabilities Integration Center (DCG-F TRADOC/DIRARCIC), 2007–2011.	4	1975 (USMA)	32	
83	Jeffrey A. Sorenson		16 Nov 2007	Army Chief Information Officer/G-6 (CIO/G-6), 2007–2011.	4	1973 (USMA)	34	
84	Eric B. Schoomaker		11 Dec 2007	Surgeon General, U.S. Army/Commanding General, U.S. Army Medical Command (TSG/CG MEDCOM), 2007–2011.	4	1970 (ROTC)	37	(1948– ) Brother of Army four-star general Peter Schoomaker.
85	Thomas G. Miller		11 Jan 2008	Commanding General, First Army, 2008–2011.	3	1973 (ROTC)	35	
86	David H. Huntoon Jr.		25 Jan 2008	Director, Army Staff (DAS), 2008–2010.; Superintendent, U.S. Military Academy, 2010–2013.	5	1973 (USMA)	35	(1951– ) Commandant, U.S. Army War College, 2003–2008.
87	Benjamin R. Mixon		1 Feb 2008	Commanding General, U.S. Army Pacific (CG USARPAC), 2008–2011.	3	1975 (NGC) (Note: Graduated from North Georgia College & State University, which merged with Gainesville State College in 2013 and is now the University of North Georgia.)	33	(1953– )
88	Joseph F. Fil Jr.		18 Feb 2008	Commanding General, Eighth U.S. Army/Chief of Staff, United Nations Command, ROK/U.S. Combined Forces Command and U.S. Forces Korea (CG EUSA/COFS UNC/CFC/USFK), 2008–2010.	2	1976 (ROTC)	32	(1953– ) (Note: Relieved with reversion to major general, November 2010; retired as major general, August 2012.) (Note: Nomination as Inspector General, U.S. Army (IG) confirmed, August 2010; retired prior to assumption of post, August 2012.)
89	Kathleen M. Gainey		13 Mar 2008	Director, Logistics, Joint Staff, J4, 2008–2011.; Deputy Commander, U.S. Transportation Command (DCDRUSTRANSCOM), 2011–2013.	5	1978 (ROTC)	30	(1956– )
90	Mitchell H. Stevenson		Jun 2008	Deputy Chief of Staff, Logistics, Army Staff (DCS G-4), 2008–2011.	3	1974 (ROTC)	34	(1952– )
91	Frank G. Helmick		3 Jul 2008	Commander, Multi-National Security Transition Command – Iraq/Commander, NATO Training Mission – Iraq (CDRMNSTC-I/CDRNTM-I), 2008–2009.; Commanding General, XVIII Airborne Corps, 2009–2011.; Deputy Commanding General, Operations, U.S. Forces - Iraq/Commanding General, XVIII Airborne Corps (DCG-O USF-I), 2011.; Commanding General, XVIII Airborne Corps, 2011–2012.	4	1976 (USMA)	32	(1953– )
92	Robert E. Durbin		23 Jul 2008	Special Assistant to the Secretary of the Army for Enterprise Management, 2008–2010.; Director, Army Office of Business Transformation (DIROBT), 2010–2011. (Note: In an acting capacity until c. July 2010.)	3	1975 (USMA)	33	
93	Edgar E. Stanton III		24 Jul 2008	Military Deputy for Budget to the Assistant Secretary of the Army (Financial Management and Comptroller) (MILDEP ASA(FM&C)), 2008–2012.	4	1972 (ROTC)	36	
94	Rick Lynch		25 Jul 2008	Commanding General, III Corps, 2008–2009.; Assistant Chief of Staff, Installation Management, Army Staff/Commanding General, U.S. Army Installation Management Command (ACSIM/CG IMCOM), 2009–2011.	3	1977 (USMA)	31	
*	David M. Rodriguez		29 Jul 2008	Senior Military Assistant to the Secretary of Defense (SMA SecDef), 2008–2009.; Commander, International Security Assistance Force Joint Command/Deputy Commander, U.S. Forces – Afghanistan (CDRIJC/DCDRUSFOR-A), 2009–2011.	3	1976 (USMA)	32	(1954– ) Promoted to general, 12 Sep 2011.
95	John F. Mulholland Jr.		7 Nov 2008	Commanding General, U.S. Army Special Operations Command (CG USASOC), 2008–2012.; Deputy Commander, U.S. Special Operations Command (DCDRUSSOCOM), 2012–2014.; Special Assistant to the Commanding General, U.S. Army Forces Command, 2014–2015.; Associate Director, Military Affairs, Central Intelligence Agency (ADMA), 2015–2016.	8	1978 (ROTC)	30	(1955– )
96	Patrick J. O'Reilly		21 Nov 2008	Director, Missile Defense Agency (DIRMDA), 2008–2012.	4	1978 (USMA)	30	(c. 1959– ) (Note: Promoted directly from rank of brigadier general.)
97	Scott C. Black		11 Dec 2008	Judge Advocate General, U.S. Army (TJAG), 2005–2009.	1	1974 (ROTC)	31 (Note: Served three years as an armor officer before selection to attend law school from 1977 to 1980 (on off-duty status); returned to active duty as a judge advocate in 1981.)	(1952– ) First three-star judge advocate general of the Army.
98	James H. Pillsbury		15 Dec 2008	Deputy Commanding General/Chief of Staff, U.S. Army Materiel Command (DCG/COFS AMC), 2008–2011.	3	1973 (ROTC)	35	
99	Carroll F. Pollett		17 Dec 2008	Director, Defense Information Systems Agency/Commander, Joint Task Force – Global Network Operations (DIRDISA/CDRJTF-GNO), 2008–2010.; Director, Defense Information Systems Agency (DIRDISA), 2010–2012.	4	1975 (OCS)	33	
*	Dennis L. Via		3 Aug 2009	Director, Command, Control, Communications and Computers/Cyber, Joint Staff, J6, 2009–2011.; Deputy Commanding General/Chief of Staff, U.S. Army Materiel Command (DCG/COFS AMC), 2011–2012.	3	1980 (ROTC)	29	(1958– ) Promoted to general, 7 Aug 2012.
100	P. Kenneth Keen		Sep 2009	Military Deputy Commander, U.S. Southern Command (MILDEPUSSOUTHCOM), 2009–2011.; Commander, Office of the Defense Representative, U.S. Embassy Pakistan, 2011–2013.	4	1974 (ROTC)	35	(1952– )
101	Mark P. Hertling		19 Sep 2009	Deputy Commanding General, Initial Military Training, U.S. Army Training and Doctrine Command (DCG-IMT TRADOC), 2009.; Deputy Commanding General, Initial Military Training, U.S. Army Training and Doctrine Command/Commanding General, U.S. Army Center for Initial Military Training (DCG-IMT TRADOC/CG USACIMT), 2009–2011.; Commanding General, U.S. Army Europe (CG USAREUR), 2011–2012.	3	1975 (USMA)	34	(1953– ) Chairman, American Battle Monuments Commission, 2021–2023.
*	Robert W. Cone		22 Sep 2009	Commanding General, III Corps, 2009–2010.; Deputy Commanding General, Operations, U.S. Forces - Iraq/Commanding General, III Corps (DCG-O USF-I), 2010–2011.	2	1979 (USMA)	30	(1957–2016) Promoted to general, 29 Apr 2011.
102	Dana K. Chipman		1 Oct 2009	Judge Advocate General, U.S. Army (TJAG), 2009–2013.	4	1980 (USMA)	29	(1958– ) Republican counsel, U.S. House Select Committee on Benghazi, 2014–2016.
103	Michael D. Barbero		7 Oct 2009	Commander, Multi-National Security Transition Command – Iraq/Commander, NATO Training Mission – Iraq (CDRMNSTC-I/CDRNTM-I), 2009–2011.; Director, Joint Improvised Explosive Device Defeat Organization (DIRJIEDDO), 2011–2013.	4	1976 (USMA)	33	(1955– )
104	Robert P. Lennox		2 Nov 2009	Deputy Chief of Staff, Programs, Army Staff (DCS G-8), 2009–2012.	3	1977 (USMA)	32	
105	Keith M. Huber		10 Nov 2009	Deputy Commander, U.S. Joint Forces Command (DCDRUSJFCOM), 2009–2011.; Commander, U.S. Joint Forces Command (CDRUSJFCOM), 2010.; Commander, Combined Joint Interagency Task Force 435 (CDRCJIATF 435), 2011–2013.	4	1975 (USMA)	34	
106	Guy C. Swan III		15 Dec 2009	Commanding General, U.S. Army North (CG ARNORTH), 2009–2011.	2	1976 (USMA)	33	(1954– )
107	Michael L. Oates		30 Dec 2009	Director, Joint Improvised Explosive Device Defeat Organization (DIRJIEDDO), 2009–2011.	2	1979 (USMA)	30	

== Background ==
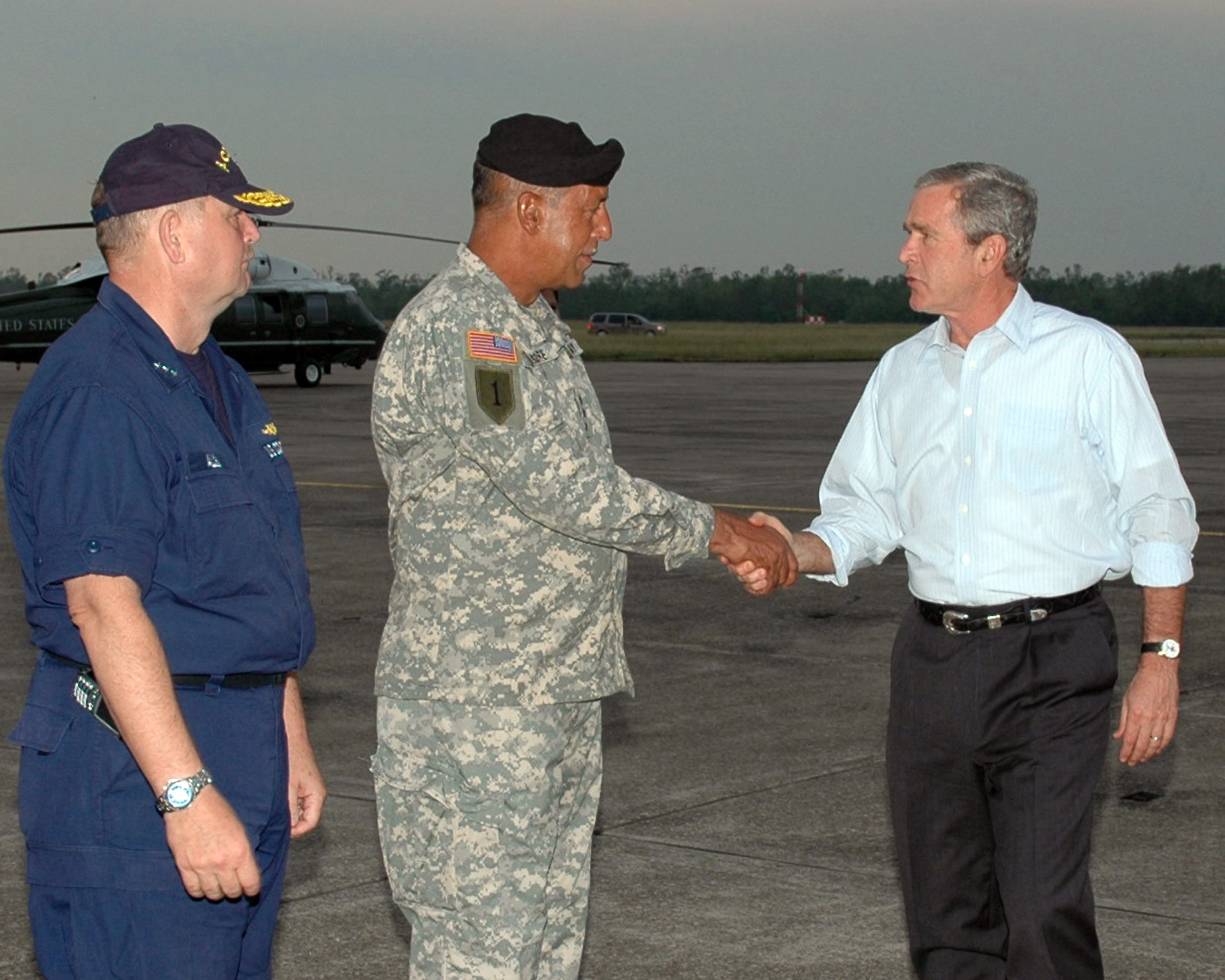
Lt. Gen. Russel L. Honoré is greeted by President George W. Bush in October 2005 at Naval Air Station Joint Reserve Base before a briefing on Joint Task Force Katrina relief efforts.

=== Three-star positions, elevations and reductions ===
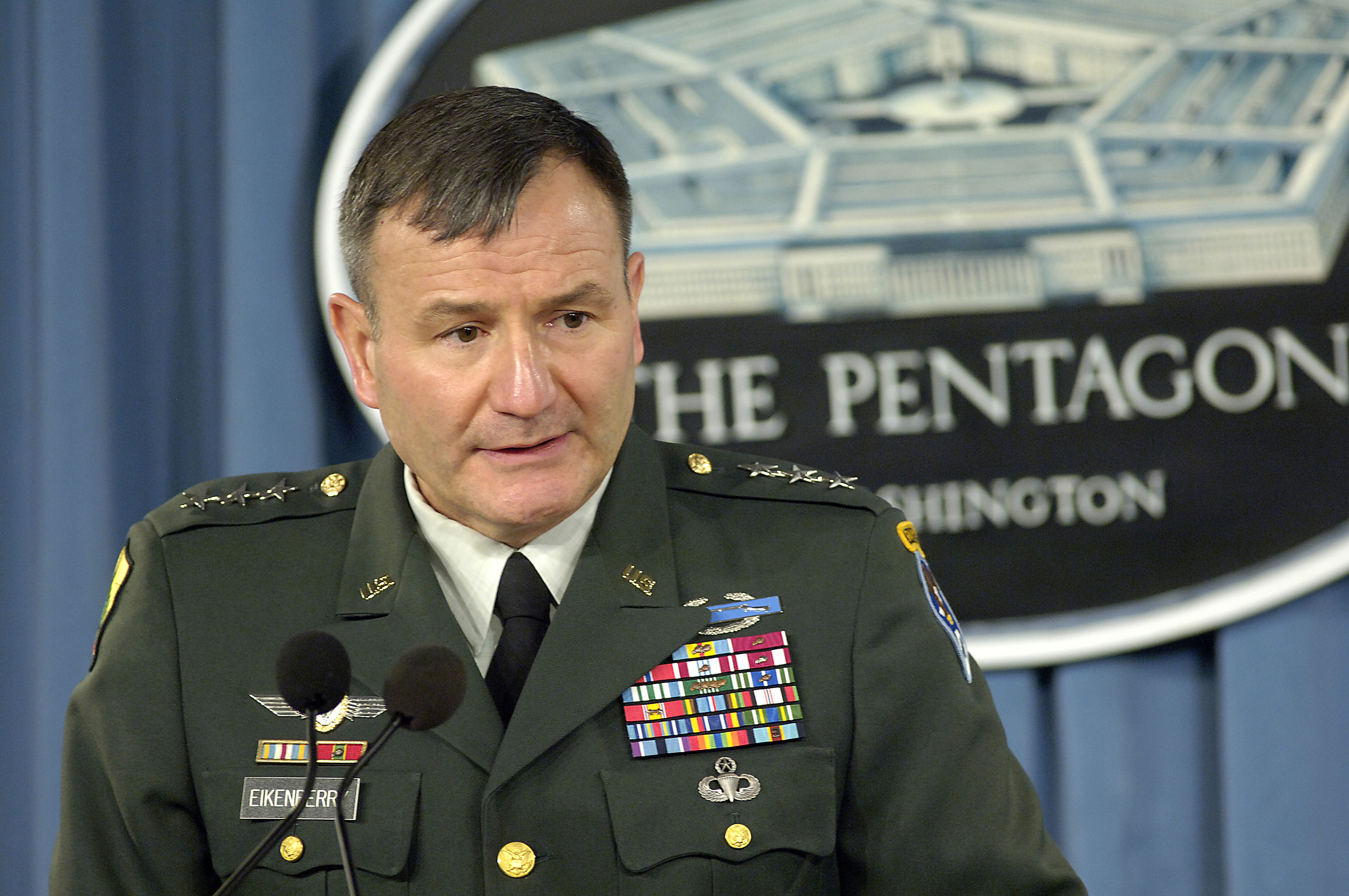
Lt. Gen. Karl W. Eikenberry, commander of Combined Forces Command – Afghanistan at a Pentagon press briefing, 8 December 2005.

Several new joint duty positions eligible to be held to be held by an Army officer, in addition to existing Army officers, were created at the appointed grade of lieutenant general, or elevated to grade between 2000 and 2010. In particular, a multitude of new positions were created in support of the war in Afghanistan and the Iraq War, which began in 2001 and 2003 respectively.

- The commanding general of Multi-National Force – Iraq (MNF–I) began as a three-star's billet under Lieutenant General Ricardo Sanchez until 2004, when it was elevated to four-star grade, with the newly established Multi-National Corps – Iraq and Multi-National Security Transition Command – Iraq (dual-hatted as commander of NATO Training Mission – Iraq) replacing it as the tactical and training-support units of the campaign respectively. Both positions became deputy commanding generals of U.S. Forces – Iraq until the command's deactivation in 2011.
- The activations of Combined Forces Command – Afghanistan (CFC-A, later Combined Security Transition Command – Afghanistan), NATO Training Mission-Afghanistan and ISAF Joint Command added three joint duty positions to the Afghanistan theater of operations between 2000 and 2010. Lieutenant Generals David W. Barno, Karl W. Eikenberry, William B. Caldwell IV, and David M. Rodriguez held these senior commands under the authority of the dual-hatted commander of the International Security Assistance Force and U.S. Forces-Afghanistan.

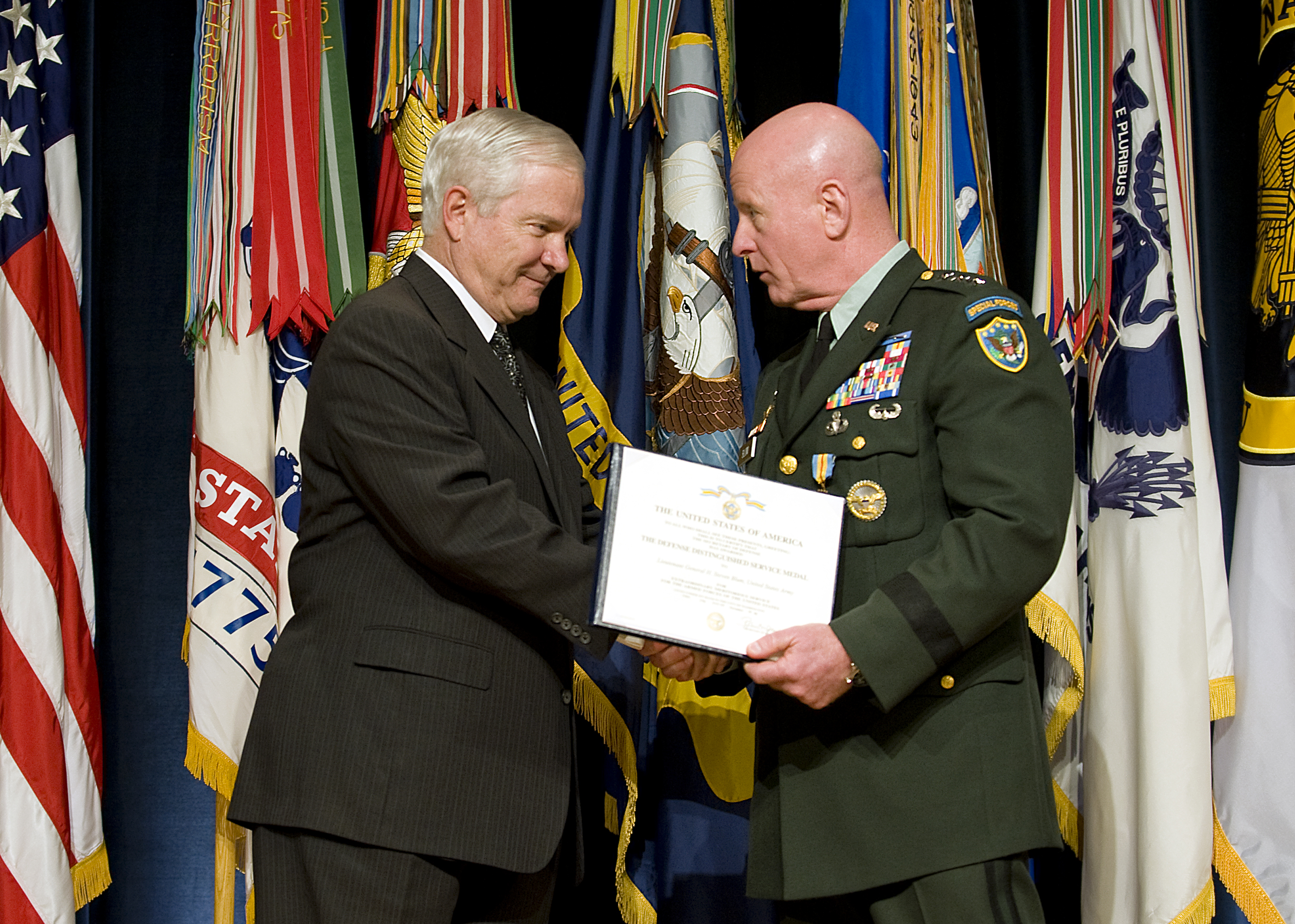
Lt. Gen. H. Steven Blum, outgoing chief of the National Guard Bureau is presented the Defense Distinguished Service Medal by Secretary of Defense Robert Gates in a ceremony on 17 November 2008.

At least three joint duty positions within the Department of Defense were created or restored, with one leading a new Defense agency, the Joint Improvised-Threat Defeat Organization. Additionally, all deputy commanders in chief of the unified combatant commands would be retitled as deputy commanders, by order of Secretary of Defense Donald H. Rumsfeld on 24 October 2002.

- The senior military assistant to the secretary of defense was briefly downgraded when one-star rear admiral Deborah A. Loewer was appointed to the post in 2000. Its prior status was restored when Vice Admiral Edmund P. Giambastiani succeeded Loewer in 2001.
- The commander of Joint Special Operations Command became a three-star's billet upon being dual-hatted as the commander of Joint Special Operations Command - Forward in 2006. Major General Stanley A. McChrystal, the incumbent commander, was confirmed for promotion to lieutenant general in February of that year.
- The director of the Joint Improvised-Threat Defeat Organization, established to deal with improvised threats such as the improvised explosive device (IEDs), was an Army lieutenant general from 2007 to 2018, when it was downgraded to a two-star's billet. Lieutenant General Thomas F. Metz was the first active duty officer to hold the directorship, succeeding retired general Montgomery C. Meigs.

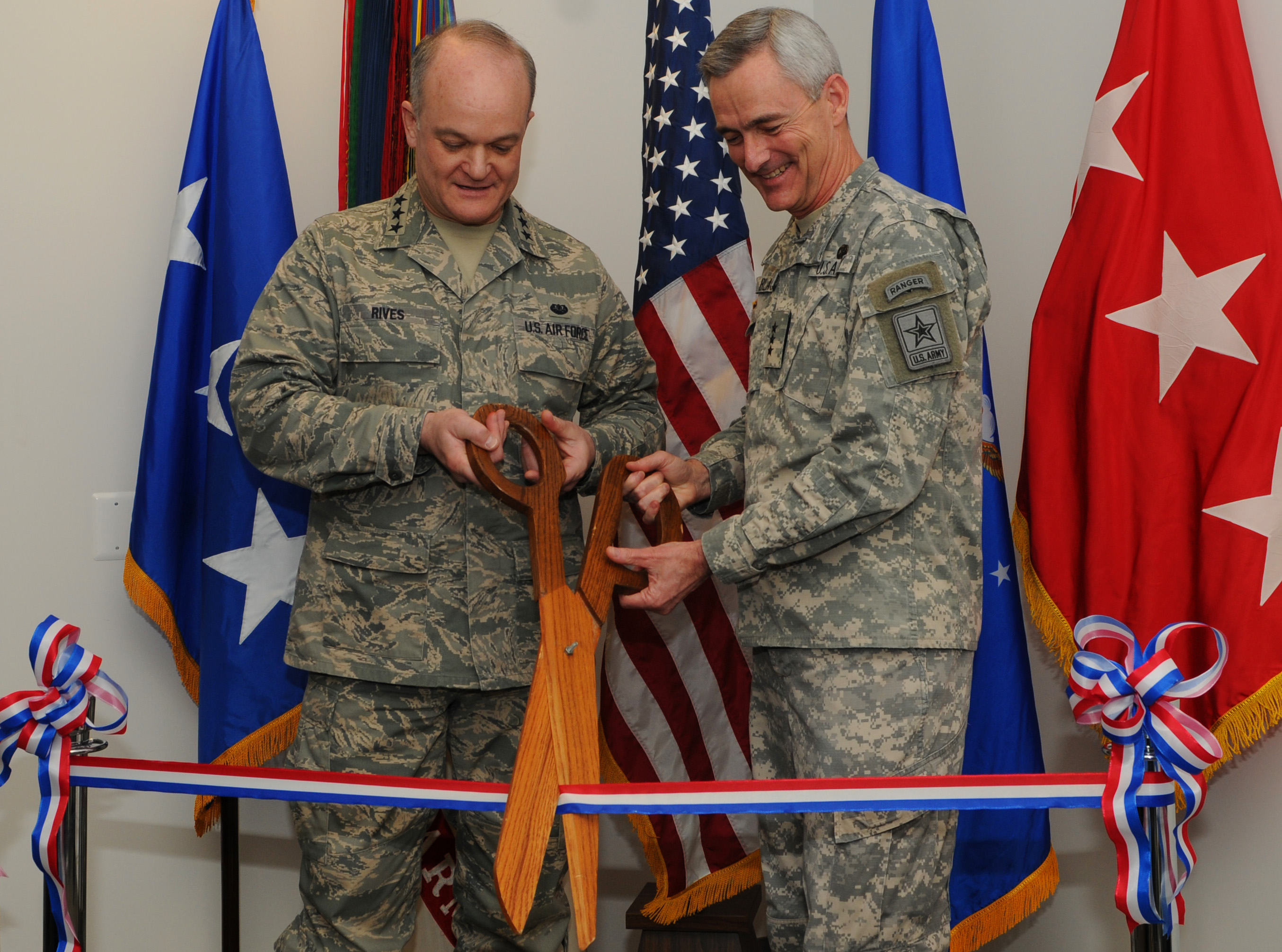
Lt. Gen. Jack L. Rives and Lt. Gen. Scott C. Black, judge advocates general of the U.S. Air Force and U.S. Army, perform the ribbon cutting at the Pentagon Army Air Force Legal Assistance Office on 25 February 2009.

Two new three-star Army commands were stood up between 2000 and 2010, and two Army major commands received new three-star positions. Additionally, all directorates of the Army Staff were redesignated in accordance with the Continental staff system in 2002, receiving the prefix "G". (Note: For example, the deputy chief of staff for personnel received the designation "G-1", replacing the outgoing acronym "DCSPERS".)

- The commanding general of U.S. Army Accessions Command, established as a component of U.S. Army Training and Doctrine Command to provide oversight over initial military training, was active from 2002 to 2012. The first commanding general of USAAC, Lieutenant General Dennis D. Cavin and his successor, Lieutenant General Robert L. Van Antwerp Jr., were also dual-hatted as the deputy commanding general for initial entry/military training of the U.S. Army Training and Doctrine Command.
- The assistant chief of staff for installation management, established to advise on garrison and installation operations for effective integration with Army installations at the base level, was dual-hatted as the commanding general of U.S. Army Installation Management Command in October 2016, which remained in place until 2015, when the two positions were separated. The incumbent assistant chief of staff, Lieutenant General Robert Wilson assumed the dual hat on 24 October 2006.
- The deputy commanding generals of U.S. Army Materiel Command and U.S. Army Training and Doctrine Command were dual-hatted as chiefs of staff of those commands beginning in 2002 and 2003 respectively. Major Generals Richard A. Hack and Anthony R. Jones, the former being the incumbent chief of staff of the U.S. Army Materiel Command, both received promotions to lieutenant general.

Several positions in the Army in charge of specialty branches and functional areas received elevations to three-star grade, either by statute or Army regulation.

- The Floyd D. Spence National Defense Authorization Act for Fiscal Year 2001 elevated the leaders of all service reserve and National Guard components to three-star grade under standard promotion authority. (Note: Special promotion authority to three-star rank for service reserve and National Guard leaders had existed since 1999 under 10 U.S.C. § 12505; the 2001 NDAA repealed this section and assigned the affected positions with statutory three-star grades under standard promotion authority.) Thus, the incumbent chief of Army Reserve, Major General Thomas J. Plewes, and the incumbent Army National Guard director, Major General Roger C. Schultz were both promoted to lieutenant general in June 2001.
- The National Defense Authorization Act for Fiscal Year 2008 elevated all judge advocates general of the service branches to three-star grade. Major General Scott C. Black, the incumbent judge advocate general of the Army, was nominated for promotion to lieutenant general in September 2008, and assumed the rank in December of the same year.

=== Senate confirmations ===
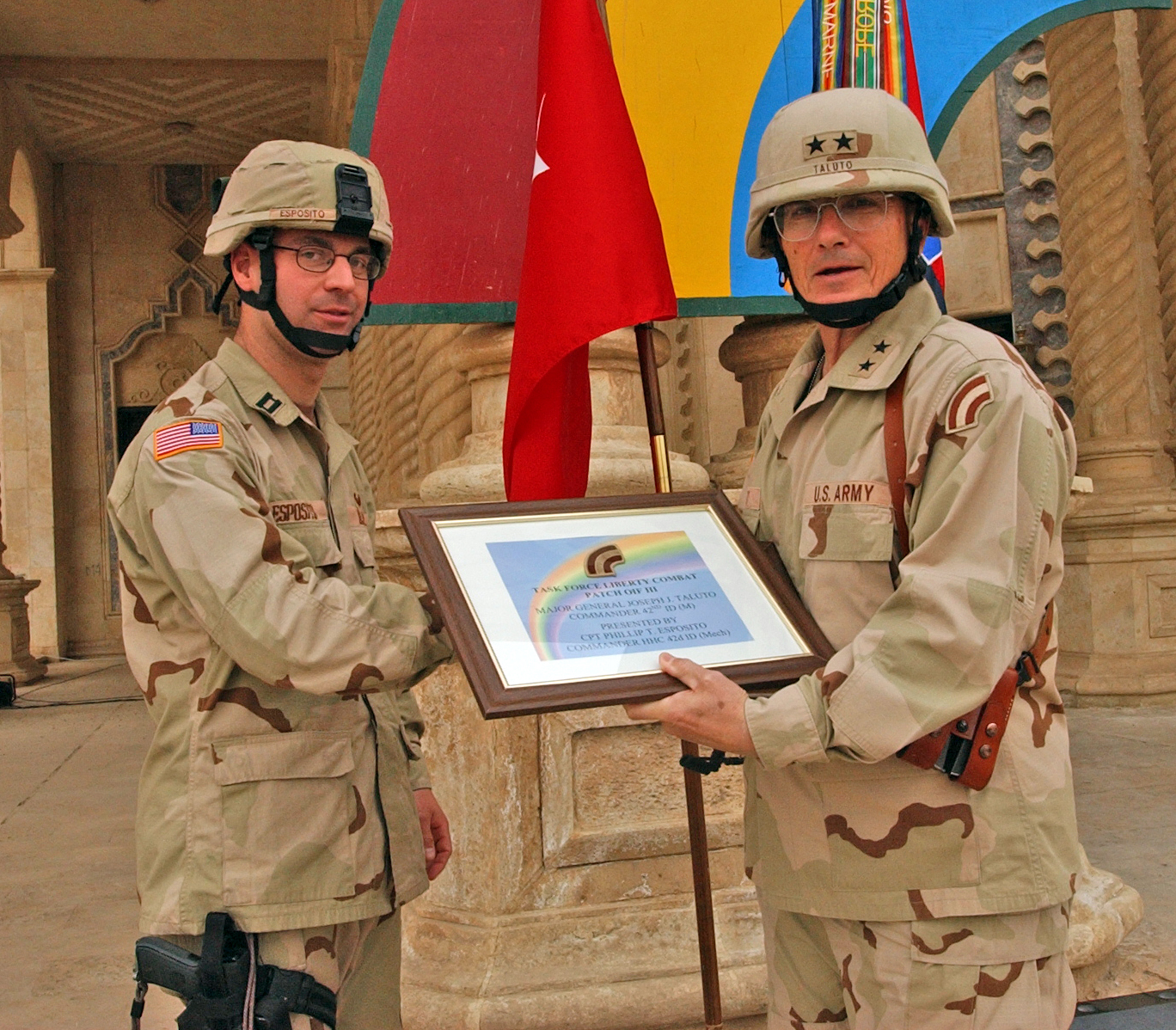
Maj. Gen. Joseph J. Taluto with Capt. Phillip Esposito at Forward Operating Base Danger in Tikrit, Iraq on 3 March 2005.

Military nominations are considered by the Senate Armed Services Committee. While it is rare for three-star or four-star nominations to face even token opposition in the Senate, nominations that do face opposition due to controversy surrounding the nominee in question are typically withdrawn. Nominations that are not withdrawn are allowed to expire without action at the end of the legislative session.

- The nomination of Major General Joseph J. Taluto to succeed Clyde A. Vaughn as director of the Army National Guard in 2010 was withdrawn due to public controversy and subsequent Senate inaction over his handling of the deaths of Phillip Esposito and Louis Allen.
- Major General Robert T. Clark's nomination to be commanding general of Fifth United States Army was twice delayed for an Armed Services committee vote due to concerns over Clark's inadequate response to the 1999 murder of Barry Winchell, a gay serviceman, when he was commander of Fort Campbell. Clark was eventually confirmed for promotion with the support of then-committee chairman John Warner after closed-session hearings were held.

Additionally, events that take place after Senate confirmation may still delay or even prevent the nominee from assuming office.

- For example, Major General John G. Rossi, who had been confirmed for promotion to lieutenant general and assignment as the commanding general of the U.S. Army Space and Missile Defense Command in April 2016 committed suicide two days before his scheduled promotion and assumption of command. As a result, the then incumbent commander of USASMDC, Lieutenant General David L. Mann, remained in command beyond statutory term limits until another nominee, Major General James H. Dickinson was confirmed by the Senate.
- Vice Admiral Scott A. Stearney assumed command of U.S. Naval Forces Central Command, Fifth Fleet, and Combined Maritime Forces in May 2018. His death in December of the same year resulted in the speedy confirmation of Rear Admiral James J. Malloy in the same month for appointment to three-star rank as his replacement.

== Legislative history ==
The following list of Congressional legislation includes all acts of Congress pertaining to appointments to the grade of lieutenant general in the United States Army from 2000 to 2009. (Note: Legislative history compiled from the U.S. Congress official website and U.S. Government Publishing Office official website.)

Each entry lists an act of Congress, its citation in the United States Statutes at Large, and a summary of the act's relevance, with officers affected by the act bracketed where applicable. Positions listed without reference to rank are assumed to be eligible for officers of three-star grade or higher.

List of legislation on appointments of lieutenant generals from 2000 to 2009
Legislation	Citation	Summary
Act of October 30, 2000 [Floyd D. Spence National Defense Authorization Act for Fiscal Year 2001]	114 Stat. 1654A–103; 114 Stat. 1654A–105; 114 Stat. 1654A–106; 114 Stat. 1654A–122	Raised statutory rank of the chief of Army Reserve, under standard promotion procedures, to lieutenant general (Thomas J. Plewes).; Raised statutory rank of the directors of the Army National Guard and Air National Guard, under standard promotion procedures, to lieutenant general (Roger C. Schultz).; Repealed special requirement for senior reserve component officers, (Note: referring to the chiefs of service reserve components (Army Reserve, Marine Forces Reserve, Naval Reserve, and Air Force Reserve) and directors of the Army and Air National Guard) per Section 12505 of Title 10, for appointment to grade of lieutenant general or vice admiral.; Increased percentage of general officers in the Army or Air Force that may be appointed above grade of major general from 15% to 15.7%.; Requested the President to advance the late Major General Walter C. Short to grade of lieutenant general on the retired list. (Note: Request not acted on by the President.)
Act of December 2, 2002 [Bob Stump National Defense Authorization Act for Fiscal Year 2003]	116 Stat. 2487; 116 Stat. 2525	Established a Department of Defense Test Resource Management Center and assigned director statutory grade of lieutenant general or vice admiral.; Exempted the senior military assistant to the secretary of defense from number and percentage limitations on general or flag officers, if serving in grade of lieutenant general or vice admiral.
Act of January 6, 2006 [National Defense Authorization Act for Fiscal Year 2006]	119 Stat. 3226	Prohibited frocking of officers below grade of major general or rear admiral to grades above major general or rear admiral.
Act of January 28, 2008 [National Defense Authorization Act for Fiscal Year 2008]	122 Stat. 94; 122 Stat. 114; 122 Stat. 115; 122 Stat. 501	Raised statutory rank of the judge advocate general of the Army to lieutenant general (Scott C. Black).; Increased percentage of general or flag officers that may be appointed above grade of major general or rear admiral from 15.7% to 16.3%.; Allowed officers serving in grade of lieutenant general, general, vice admiral, or admiral to continue holding such position for up to 60 days following reassignment from such position, unless placed sooner in another designated position.; Made position of principal military deputy to the assistant secretary of the Army for acquisition, technology and logistics statutory, to be selected from active duty lieutenant generals of the Army.; Required one deputy commander of the combatant command covering the geographic area of responsibility of which includes the United States (Note: refers to the United States Northern Command (USNORTHCOM).) to be a National Guard officer eligible for promotion to lieutenant general (William G. Webster Jr., H. Steven Blum).
Act of October 14, 2008 [Duncan Hunter National Defense Authorization Act for Fiscal Year 2009]	122 Stat. 4433; 122 Stat. 4435; 122 Stat. 4436	Increased percentage of general officers in the Army or Air Force that may be appointed above grade of major general from 16.3% to 16.4%, and reserved percentage increase in Army general officers for those serving in acquisition positions.; Revised cap on total number of authorized Army general officers to be reduced to 225, of which 45 may be appointed in grade of lieutenant general pending a congressional report by the secretary of defense.; Authorized appointment of up to 68 officers in grade of lieutenant general or vice admiral for joint duty assignments.
Act of October 28, 2009 [National Defense Authorization Act for Fiscal Year 2010]	123 Stat. 2273	Capped total number of Army general officers who may be appointed in grade of lieutenant general at 45, pursuant to changes made under NDAA 2009.

== See also ==
- Lieutenant general (United States)
- General officers in the United States
- List of active duty United States four-star officers
- List of active duty United States three-star officers
- List of United States Army four-star generals
- List of lieutenant generals in the United States Army before 1960
- List of United States Army lieutenant generals from 1990 to 1999
- List of United States Army lieutenant generals from 2010 to 2019
- List of United States Army lieutenant generals since 2020
- List of United States military leaders by rank
- Staff (military)
