= United States Army Accessions Command =

The U.S. Army Accessions Command (USAAC) (2002–2011) was established by general order on 15 February 2002 and activated at Fort Monroe, VA. It was a subordinate command of TRADOC charged with providing integrated command and control of the recruiting and initial military training for the Army's officer, warrant officer, and enlisted forces. Designed to meet the human resources needs of the Army from initial contact with recruiters to first unit of assignment, the command's goal was to transform volunteers into soldiers and leaders for the Army. As of 2011, the U.S. Army Accessions Command was de-activated as part of Defense and Army efficiency reviews. The decision was a result of a comprehensive study to develop appropriate options for the alignment of commands that fulfill human resource functions.

In accordance with the Secretary of the Army's Human Resource Organizational Reform Initiative, the US Army Accessions Command cased its colors on 18 January 2012, and the command ceased functions as the higher headquarters for US Army Cadet Command, US Army Recruiting Command, and the Accessions Support Brigade and as the Army's primary executor of Accessions-based marketing, advertising, research, and coordination. In order to manage the completion of all discontinuance tasks by 30 September 2012, USAAC was re-designated the USAAC Discontinuance Task Force, under the command of Major General Jefforey A. Smith.

The Command was established by Headquarters, Department of the Army General Orders Number 1 as a subordinate command of the United States Army Training and Doctrine Command. Although elements were located at Fort Knox, some headquarters subunits were also located at Fort Monroe. The U.S. Army Recruiting Command is the principal command of the U.S. Army Accessions Command, and is co-located. Its other subunits are the Strategic Outreach Directorate and the Accessions Support Brigade.

The Accessions Support Brigade is the public face of the Command, and is perhaps the most unusual of the Army's units, which includes Mission Support Battalion's mobile recruiting support sections mounted on colourful 18-wheeler trucks, the Army Parachute Team (about a company), "The Golden Knights", and the Special Operations Recruiting Company (SORC), responsible for recruiting all individuals serving with Army special operations that also performs demonstrations by its United States Army Marksmanship Unit.

The US Army Accessions Command also controlled the Army Sports Program, and other elements involved with public relations and increasing the public's favorable awareness of the US Army.

The decision to de-activate the command was announced on 20 April 2011. The move is said to need 12–18 months for completion and is expected to reduce costs while realigning necessary functions under other command structures.

== Major subordinate organizations ==
- United States Army Recruiting Command (USAREC)
- Recruiting and Retention School (RSS)
- U.S. Army Cadet Command
- Officer Candidate School (OCS)
- U.S. Army Warrant Officer Career College (WOCC)
- Drill Sergeant School (DSS)
- U.S. Army Marksmanship Unit (AMU)
- U.S. Army Parachute Team (Golden Knights)

== List of commanders ==
No.	Commanding General		Term		
No.	Portrait	Name	Took office	Left office	Duration
1	Dennis D. Cavin	Lieutenant General; Dennis D. Cavin (born 1947)	15 February 2002	June 2004	~2 years, 107 days
-	Michael D. Rochelle	Major General; Michael D. Rochelle (born 1950); Acting	June 2004	~August 2004	~61 days
2	Randal R. Castro	Major General; Randal R. Castro	~August 2004	21 November 2004	~112 days
3	Robert L. Van Antwerp Jr.	Lieutenant General; Robert L. Van Antwerp Jr. (born 1950)	21 November 2004	18 May 2007	2 years, 178 days
4	Benjamin Freakley	Lieutenant General; Benjamin Freakley (born 1953)	18 May 2007	19 January 2012	4 years, 246 days
