= Joint Improvised-Threat Defeat Organization =

US Department of Defense organization

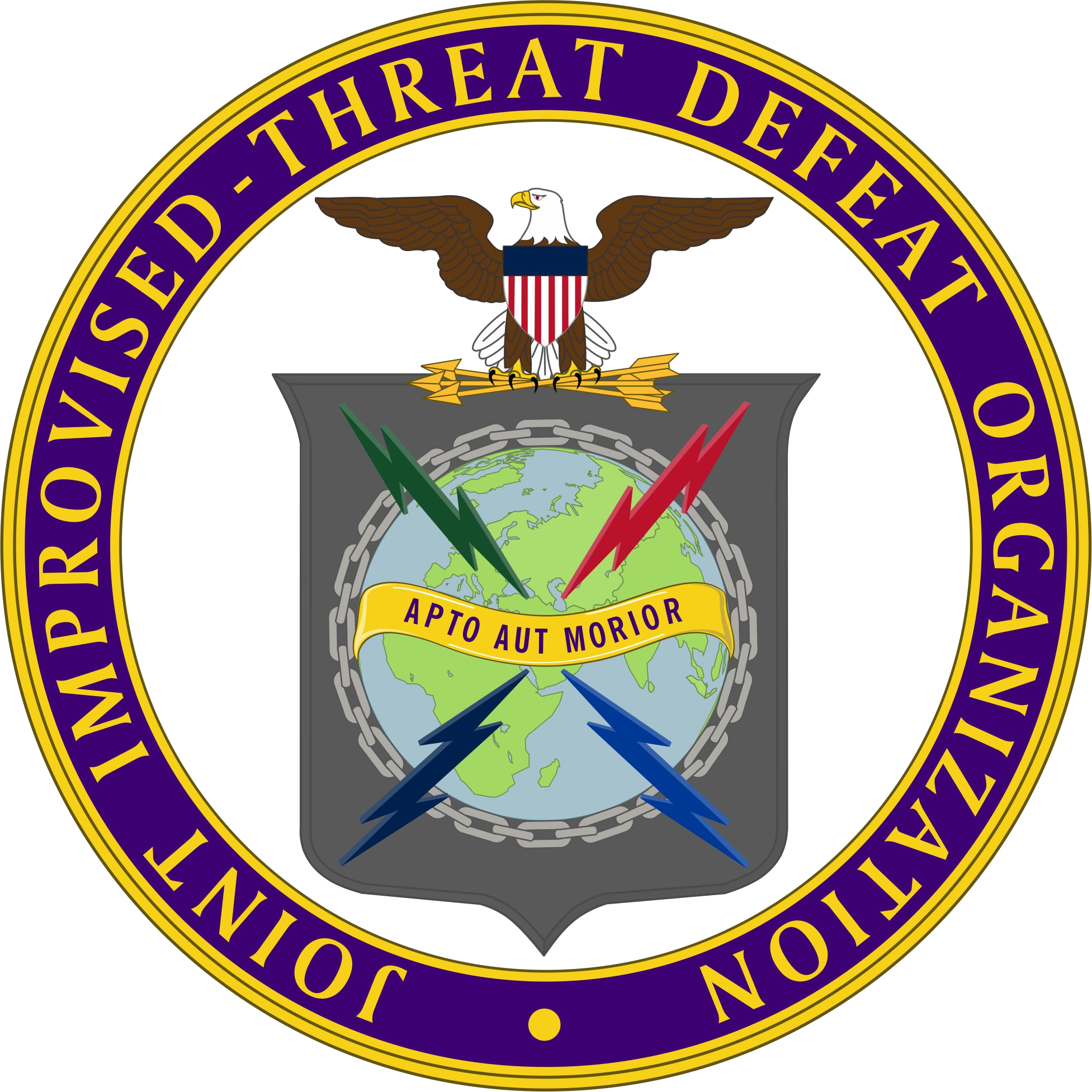

Agency overview
- Formed: February 14, 2006
- Headquarters: The Pentagon
- Employees: 185 government civilians and military personnel; over 1000 contract personnel
- Annual budget: ~$550M for FY19
- Agency executives: Christopher Bentley, MG, US Army, Director; Dell Bull, RDML, USN, Acting Deputy Director
- Parent agency: Defense Threat Reduction Agency
- Website: https://www.jieddo.mil

The Joint Improvised-Threat Defeat Organization (JIDO) is a combat support organization of the U.S. Department of Defense (DoD) organization under the Defense Threat Reduction Agency (DTRA) that deals with improvised threats such as the improvised explosive device (IEDs) and small unmanned aerial systems (sUASs). JIDO was born from the Joint IED Defeat Organization (JIEDDO) established in 2006, which focused on IEDs. JIDO's mission is to "enable Department of Defense actions to counter improvised threats with tactical responsiveness and anticipatory acquisition in support of combatant commanders' efforts to prepare for, and adapt to, battlefield surprise." This mission supports counter-terrorism, counter-insurgency and other related mission areas including Counter-IED.

The change from JIEDDO to JIDA occurred when Deputy Defense Secretary Robert Work approved an organizational realignment of JIEDDO from a joint wartime activity to a combat support agency under the authority, direction and control of the Under Secretary of Defense for Acquisition, Technology and Logistics (USD(AT&L)). Under the 2016 Defense Authorization Act, DoD was directed to move JIDA to a military department or under an existing defense agency. DoD decided to reclassify JIDA as an organization under DTRA. On September 30, 2016, JIDA moved under DTRA and officially changed its name to JIDO to reflect the change from an Agency to an Organization.

== Organization ==
Operating under the direction, authority, and control of DTRA, JIDO consists of intelligence, operations, plans-policy, advanced IT, training integration, rapid RDTE, and ORSA divisions overseen by a Director of Operations-Intelligence, a Director of Plans-Policy-Training, and a Director of Materiel Solutions.

Under JIDO, there are three lines of effort - intelligence integration, rapid capability delivery, and whole of government/ communities of action support all supported by integrated training and synchronized operationally as capabilities are delivered to the CCMDs and their deployed US Joint forces.

== History ==
JIDO traces its origins to the U.S. Army's Counter-IED Task Force established in 2003 under the leadership of U.S. Army Brigadier General Joseph Votel, to respond to the rapidly escalating IED threat at the outset of the Iraq War in 2003. In mid-2004, then-Deputy Secretary of Defense Paul D. Wolfowitz transformed the Army-led organization into a joint IED task force reporting directly to him. Remaining under the leadership of Brigadier General Votel, the once-small group could now leverage experience and expertise of warfighters across the services, enhance its networks attack focus, increase procurement of device-defeat tools, and build a robust set of IED-specific force training operations. As the IED threat in Iraq continued to escalate, a Deputy's Advisory Working Group convened in December 2005 and recommended the creation of a permanent organization. On February 14, 2006, then-Deputy Secretary of Defense, Gordon England signed Department of Defense Directive 2000.19E, establishing JIEDDO. U.S. Army General Montgomery C. Meigs served as JIEDDO's first director.

JIEDDO directors

- General (Ret.) Montgomery C. Meigs, U.S. Army, 2006-2007
- Lieutenant General Thomas F. Metz, U.S. Army, 2007-2009
- Lieutenant General Michael L. Oates, U.S. Army, 2010-2011
- Lieutenant General Michael D. Barbero, U.S. Army, 2011-2013
- Lieutenant General John D. Johnson, U.S. Army, 2013–2015
- Lieutenant General Michael H. Shields, U.S. Army, 2015–2018

JIDO Director

- Major General Christopher Bentley, U.S. Army, 2018–Present

== Seal ==
Currently a white disc edged yellow, a dark gray shield bearing a gray chain encircling a terrestrial globe Proper, surmounted throughout the center by a yellow horizontal motto scroll with the Latin inscription, “APTO AUT MORIOR,” which translates to “I Must Adapt or I Will Die” in dark purple. The scroll is between four lightning bolts diagonally placed, radiating from the center of the globe—two above, green to the left and red to the right and two below, dark blue to the lower left and blue to the lower right. Resting on top of the shield, an American bald eagle Proper, wings displayed horizontally, grasping three crossed yellow arrows and bearing on its breast a shield blazoned as follows: Argent, a paly of six Gules, a chief Azure; all within a dark purple designation band double-edged yellow, inscribed above, “JOINT IMPROVISED-THREAT DEFEAT ORGANIZATION” and below, a disc, all yellow.

The dark gray shield denotes the unknown future of improvised threats and JIDO's role to anticipate the unknown. The terrestrial globe symbolizes the global nature of improvised threats and JIDO's area of responsibility supporting the worldwide deployment of U.S. warfighters in support of the Combatant Commanders. The chain encircling the globe suggests the interconnected communities of action necessary to contain enemy networks, defeat improvised threats and protect U.S. forces, while at the same time fighting interconnected threat networks. The war eagle, adapted from the Department of Defense seal, denotes JIDO's relationship under the authority, direction and control of the Defense Threat Reduction Agency as a combat support agency. The dark purple suggests the joint nature of this mission. The lightning bolts indicate speed and accuracy of rapid capability delivery to U.S. forces—green for the Army, dark blue for the Navy, ultramarine blue for the Air Force and scarlet for the Marine Corps. They represent each branch of service to which materiel and non-materiel capabilities and support are provided. As the mission changed and the capabilities of JIDO were codified, symbolism for this seal was carried from the Joint Improvised Explosive Device Defeat Organization to the Joint Improvised-Threat Defeat Agency to the current organization.
