= Roger C. Schultz =

United States Army Lieutenant General, director of Army National Guard

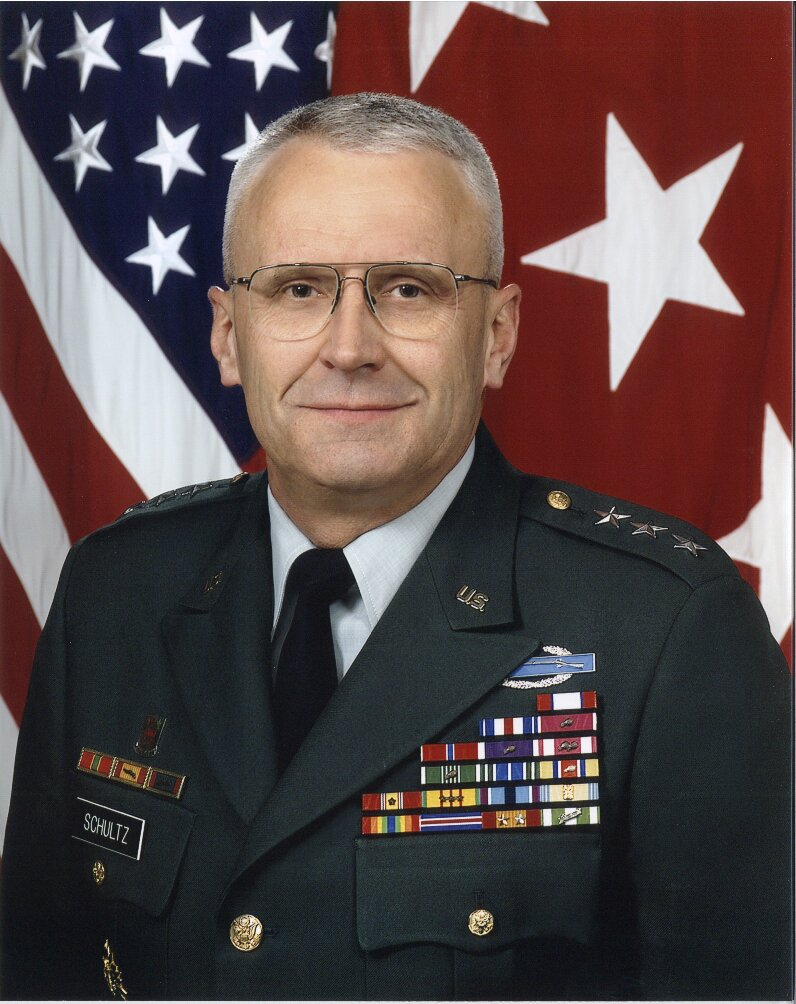
- Born: October 13, 1945 (age 81); Le Mars, Iowa, U.S.
- Military career
- Allegiance: United States of America
- Branch: United States Army
- Service years: 1963–2005
- Rank: Lieutenant General
- Commands: 1st Battalion, 168th Infantry; 2nd Brigade, 34th Infantry Division; Director, Army National Guard
- Awards: Army Distinguished Service Medal; Silver Star; Legion of Merit; Bronze Star Medal; Meritorious Service Medal; Army Commendation Medal; Army Achievement Medal; Combat Infantryman Badge

Roger C. Schultz (born October 13, 1945) is a retired United States Army lieutenant general who served as director of the Army National Guard.

== Early life ==
Roger Charles Schultz was born in Le Mars, Iowa on October 13, 1945. He graduated from LeMars Community School in 1963 and enlisted in the Iowa Army National Guard. He received his commission as a Second Lieutenant of Infantry upon graduation from Officer Candidate School in 1967.

Schultz is a licensed airplane pilot (Commercial and Multi-Engine Land Instrument Rating).

== Vietnam war ==
In 1968, Schultz was called to active duty as a member of the Iowa National Guard's 2nd Battalion, 133rd Infantry. After training at Fort Carson, Colorado, he served in Vietnam with 2nd Battalion, 22nd Infantry Regiment in 1969, first as a rifle platoon leader, and later as a scout platoon leader. Schultz received the Silver Star for heroism in combat, as well as the Combat Infantryman Badge, Purple Heart (two awards), Vietnam Service Medal (with 3 Bronze Stars), Republic of Vietnam Gallantry Cross (with Gold and Silver Star), Republic of Vietnam Campaign Medal (with "60" Device), Republic of Vietnam Gallantry Cross (with Palm Unit Citation), and Republic of Vietnam Civil Actions Unit Citation.

== Education ==
Schultz is a graduate of the Infantry Officer Basic and Advanced Courses, and the United States Army Command and General Staff College.

He received a Bachelor of Science degree in Management from Upper Iowa University in 1980. In 1992 he graduated from the United States Army War College and received a Master of Public Administration degree from Shippensburg State University.

== Post Vietnam war ==
Schultz continued his military service after the Vietnam War, serving in a variety of command and staff positions in Iowa. His assignments included: Commander, Company B, 2nd Battalion, 133rd Infantry (1975–1976); commander, 1st Battalion, 168th Infantry (1982–1984); chief of staff, Iowa Army National Guard (1988–1991); commander, 2nd Brigade, 34th Infantry Division (1992–1995); and Deputy Adjutant General, Iowa National Guard (1995–1998). While serving as Deputy Adjutant General, Schultz was also assigned as deputy director of the Army's Directorate for Mobilization Support, part of an effort by Secretary of Defense William Cohen to better integrate the Reserve and Active components of the military for fighting domestic terrorism.

== Director, Army National Guard ==
In 1998, Schultz was appointed director of the Army National Guard as a major general.

In 2001, Congress passed legislation upgrading the positions in charge of the Reserve components, including Director of the Army National Guard and Director of the Air National Guard, and Schultz was promoted to lieutenant general.

Schultz served as director of the Army National Guard until retiring in 2005. he was succeeded by Clyde A. Vaughn.

== Post military career ==
After retiring from the military, Schultz was named Vice President of Unitech, a company which provided homeland security and military training and simulation products and services to government and the military. Unitech was later purchased by Lockheed Martin, and Schultz became a program Management Director.

In 2011, Schultz became Senior Vice President and Chief Operating Officer of SENTEL Corporation, which provides technology development and testing services to the military and government agencies.

Schultz was also a member of the Board of Directors of 5Star Life Insurance Company and the Armed Forces Benefit Association. In addition, he served on the Association of the United States Army Council of Trustees.

In 2015 Schultz was named president of the Army Historical Foundation, the fundraising entity of the National Museum of the United States Army.

== Awards and decorations ==
Combat Infantryman Badge
Army Staff Identification Badge
Distinctive Unit Insignia

Army Distinguished Service Medal
Silver Star
Legion of Merit with one bronze oak leaf cluster
Bronze Star Medal
Purple Heart with oak leaf cluster
Meritorious Service Medal with two oak leaf clusters
Army Commendation Medal with oak leaf cluster
Army Achievement Medal
Army Superior Unit Award
Army Reserve Component Achievement Medal with one Silver Oak Leaf Cluster
National Defense Service Medal with two bronze service stars
Vietnam Service Medal with three service stars
Humanitarian Service Medal
Armed Forces Reserve Medal with gold Hourglass device
Army Service Ribbon
Army Reserve Components Overseas Training Ribbon
Vietnam Gallantry Cross with gold and silver star
Vietnam Gallantry Cross Unit Citation
Republic of Vietnam Civil Actions Medal Unit Citation
Vietnam Campaign Medal

=== Additional awards ===
In 2006 Schultz was the commencement speaker at Morningside College and received an honorary Doctor of Laws degree.

== Effective dates of promotions ==
- Second lieutenant, Army National Guard, June 26, 1967
- Second Lieutenant, Army of the United States, August 21, 1968
- First lieutenant, Army of the United States, April 1, 1969
- First lieutenant, Army National Guard, June 25, 1969
- Captain, Army National Guard, May 17, 1971
- Major, Army National Guard, March 31, 1976
- Lieutenant colonel, Army National Guard, February 10, 1981
- Colonel, Army National Guard, February 1, 1985
- Brigadier general, Army National Guard, May 21, 1996
- Major general, Army National Guard, June 1, 1998
- Lieutenant general, May 24, 2001

== External resources ==
- Roger C. Schultz at National Guard Bureau General Officer Management Office
