= Thomas J. Plewes =

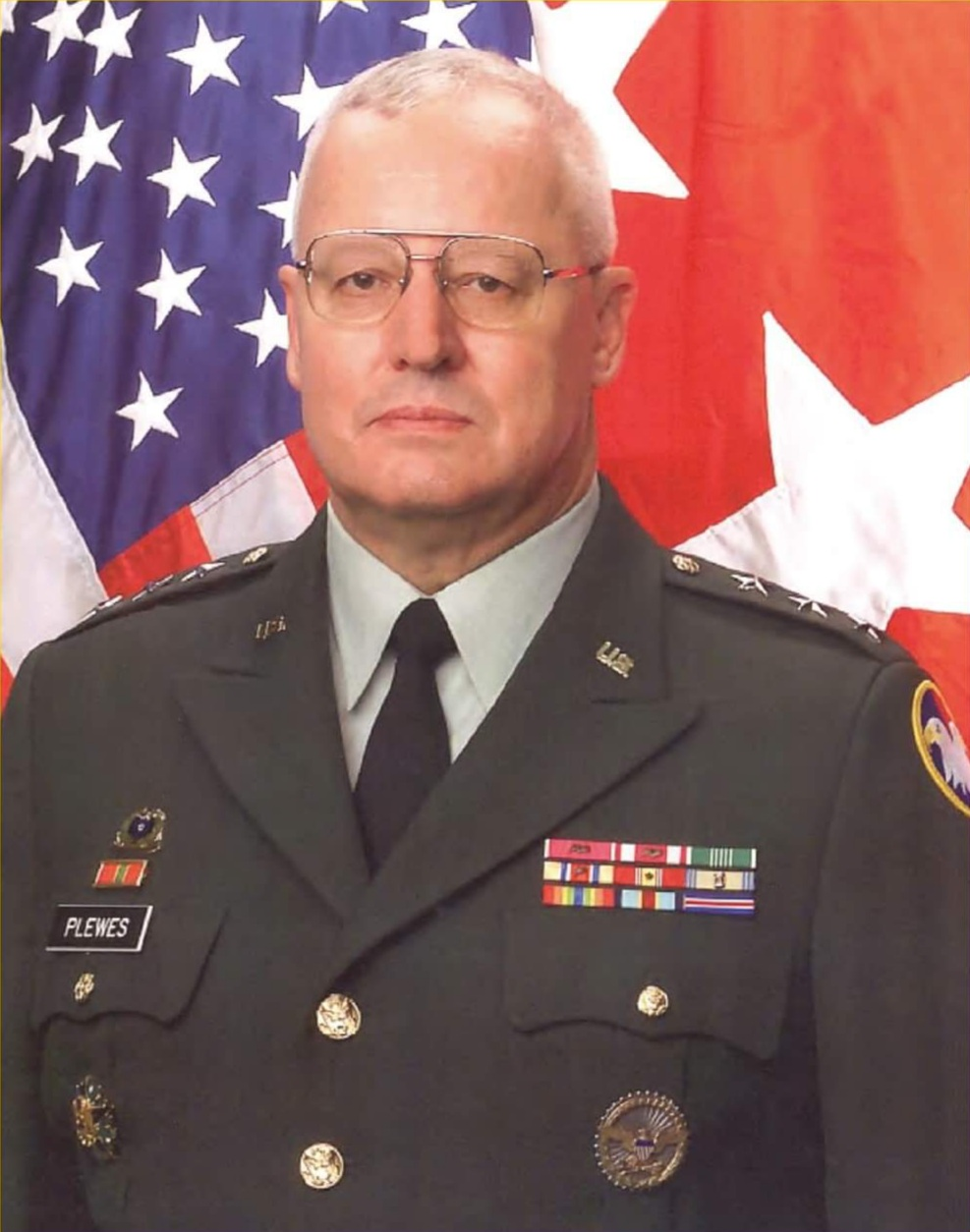
- Official portrait, 2001
- Born: 15 December 1940 (age 85); Zeeland, Michigan, U.S.
- Military career
- Allegiance: United States
- Branch: United States Army
- Service years: 1966–2002
- Rank: Lieutenant General
- Commands: United States Army Reserve

Thomas Jeffrey Plewes (born 15 December 1940) is a retired lieutenant general in the United States Army. He is a former chief of the United States Army Reserve, a position he held from 25 May 1998 to 24 May 2002.

Raised in Zeeland, Michigan, Plewes earned a B.A. degree in economics from Hope College in 1962. He went to work for the United States Department of Labor as an economist in Washington, D.C. After Project Head Start was launched in 1965, Plewes was sent to help establish local programs for poor and minority preschoolers in the South. Near the end of 1965, he lost his Selective Service occupational deferment. Plewes enlisted in the Army in 1966 and was commissioned on 20 January 1967 after completing Engineer Officer Candidate School.

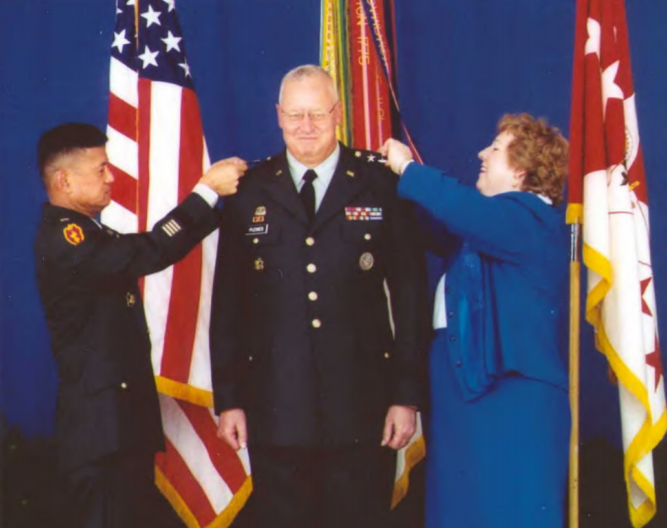
Major General Plewes becomes the first chief of the Army Reserve promoted to lieutenant general in that position. Army Chief of Staff General Eric K. Shinseki and Mrs. Liz Plewes pin the rank on at a Pentagon ceremony, 13 June 2001

Plewes served on active duty until February 1969, which included time spent in West Germany. He then joined the Bureau of Labor Statistics at the Department of Labor, but remained a Reserve officer. Plewes completed an M.A. degree in economics at George Washington University in 1972. He became deputy commanding general of the United States Army Reserve Command in December 1996 and then became commanding general in May 1998. Plewes was promoted to lieutenant general in June 2001.

Plewes was named a Fellow of the American Statistical Association in 1989.

Military offices
Preceded by Max Baratz	Commanding General, United States Army Reserve; May 25, 1998 - May 25, 2002	Succeeded by James R. Helmly
