= Thomas F. Metz =

Lieutenant General in the United States Army

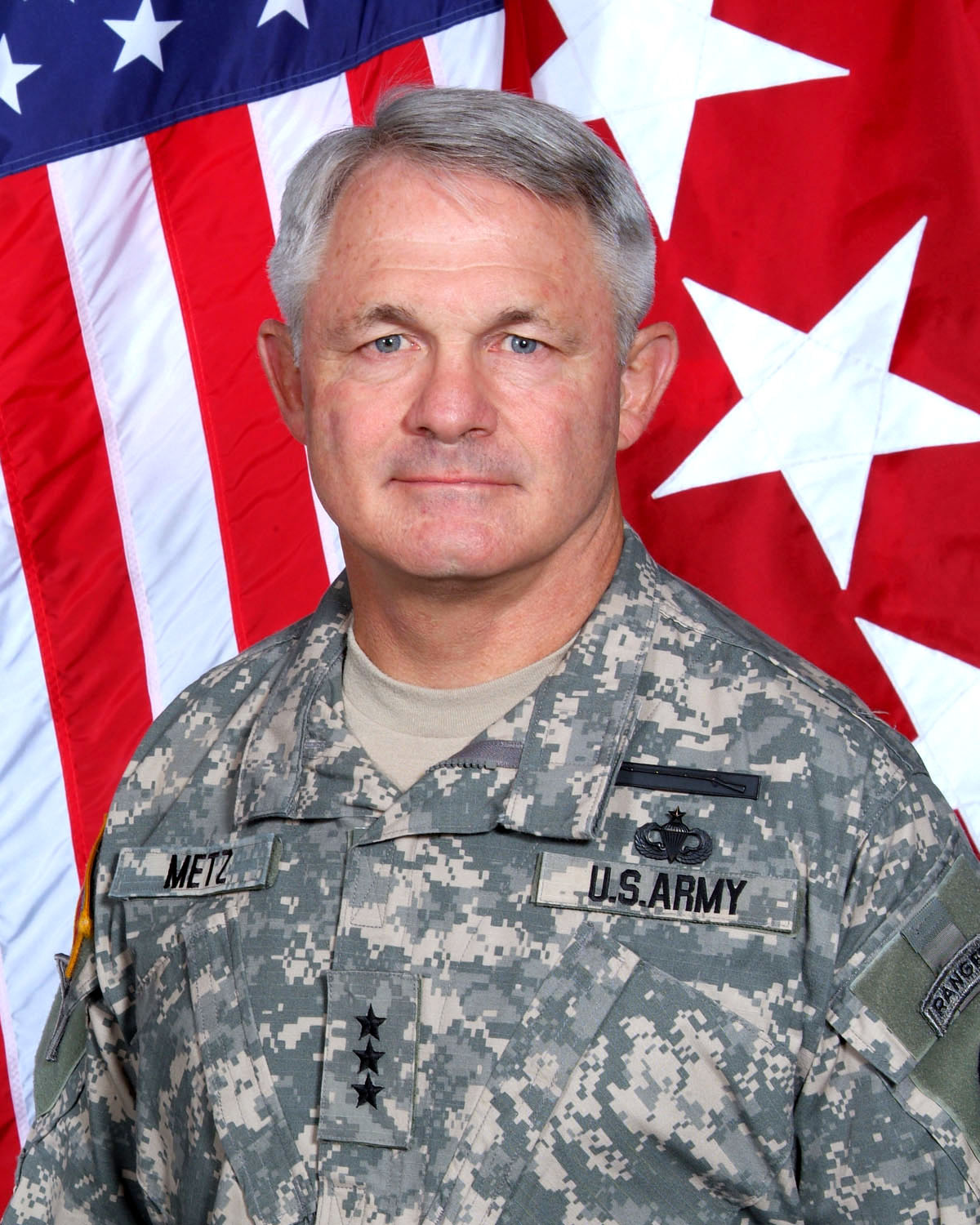
- Lieutenant General Thomas F. Metz
- Born: September 21, 1948 (age 78); Elkin, North Carolina, U.S.
- Military career
- Allegiance: United States of America
- Branch: United States Army
- Service years: 1966–2010
- Rank: Lieutenant general
- Nickname: Tom
- Commands: III Corps; 24th Infantry Division
- Awards: Defense Distinguished Service Medal; Army Distinguished Service Medal; Legion of Merit (3)

Thomas Fredric Metz (born September 21, 1948 in Elkin, North Carolina) is a retired lieutenant general in the United States Army. Metz retired from the Army in Jan 2010 after more than 40 years of active military service. His tour of duty before retirement was as the director, Joint Improvised Explosive Device Defeat Organization., leading the DOD organization tasked with finding and fielding ways to defeat the IED threat. Previously, he was the deputy commanding general and chief of staff, U.S. Army Training and Doctrine Command. Previous to that assignment, he was commanding general of the U.S. III Corps and Fort Hood. He assumed command of III Corps on 7 February 2003.

== Early life and career ==
Metz lived in North Carolina until enlisting in the Army in June 1966. In August, after basic training at Fort Gordon, Georgia, he entered the United States Military Academy Preparatory School. He received a Regular Army appointment to the United States Military Academy, and he entered in July 1967. Upon graduation from West Point in June 1971, he was commissioned a second lieutenant in the infantry. From March 1972 until January 1975, Metz served as platoon leader, Assistant S-3, Scout Platoon Leader, and Combat Support Company Executive Officer with 1st Battalion, 509th Airborne Infantry, in Germany and Italy.

Metz took command of Company C, 10th BCT Battalion, Fort Jackson, South Carolina, in January 1976. He relinquished command in June 1976 to become the aide-de-camp for the commander, Readiness Region VI, at Fort Knox, Kentucky. While at Fort Knox, he commanded C Company, 4th Battalion, 54th Infantry (Mechanized), 194th Armored Brigade, from June 1977 until June 1978.

Metz returned to West Point in June 1981 and was an assistant professor in the Mechanical Engineering Department until May 1984. He moved to Fort Benning, Georgia, where he was the S-3 and XO of the 3d Battalion, 7th Infantry (Mechanized); and the S-3, 197th Separate Infantry Brigade (Mechanized). While at Fort Benning, he also served as a division chief in the Infantry School's Combat Developments Directorate from May 1986 until June 1987.

Returning to Fort Knox in June 1987, Metz commanded the 4th Battalion, 15th Infantry (Mechanized), 194th Armored Brigade, until July 1989. From June 1990 until June 1992, he served as the G-3, 2d Infantry Division, Republic of Korea.

Metz commanded the 2nd Brigade, 1st Infantry Division (Mechanized), from July 1992 to July 1994. He then served as the division and Fort Riley chief of staff until May 1995. After his tour in the 1st Infantry Division, LTG Metz joined the Training and Doctrine Command (TRADOC) and served as director of the Army's Experimental Force Coordination Cell for the 4th Infantry Division (Mechanized) at Fort Hood, Texas, and the assistant division commander for Support for the 4th Infantry Division (Mechanized).

In February 1998, Metz was assigned as the deputy director for joint warfighting capabilities Assessment, J-8, until June 2000. Metz served as vice director for force structure, resources, and assessment, J-8, The Joint Staff, until November 2001.

On 7 November 2001, Metz assumed command of the 24th Infantry Division (Mechanized) and Fort Riley. During this period, Metz served for 4 months as the chief of staff for CENTCOM during Operation Enduring Freedom from October 2002 to January 2003.

Metz holds a master's degree in mechanical engineering from North Carolina State University. He also holds a professional engineer's license from the Commonwealth of Virginia. His military schools include the Infantry Officer Basic and Advanced Courses, the Command and General Staff College, and the Army War College. Currently, he serves as a board member at Trident University International, an online, military-friendly college.

Metz's awards and decorations include the Defense Distinguished Service Medal, Army Distinguished Service Medal, Legion of Merit with 2 Oak Leaf Clusters, Meritorious Service Medal with 3 Oak Leaf Clusters, Army Commendation Medal with 2 Oak Leaf Clusters, Good Conduct Medal, National Defense Service Medal with 2 Service Stars, Army Service Ribbon, Overseas Service Ribbon with Numeral 3, Expert Infantryman Badge, Senior Parachutist Badge, Ranger Tab, and Belgium Brevet "A" Commando.
