= Dana Chipman =

United States Army general

Dana Kyle Chipman
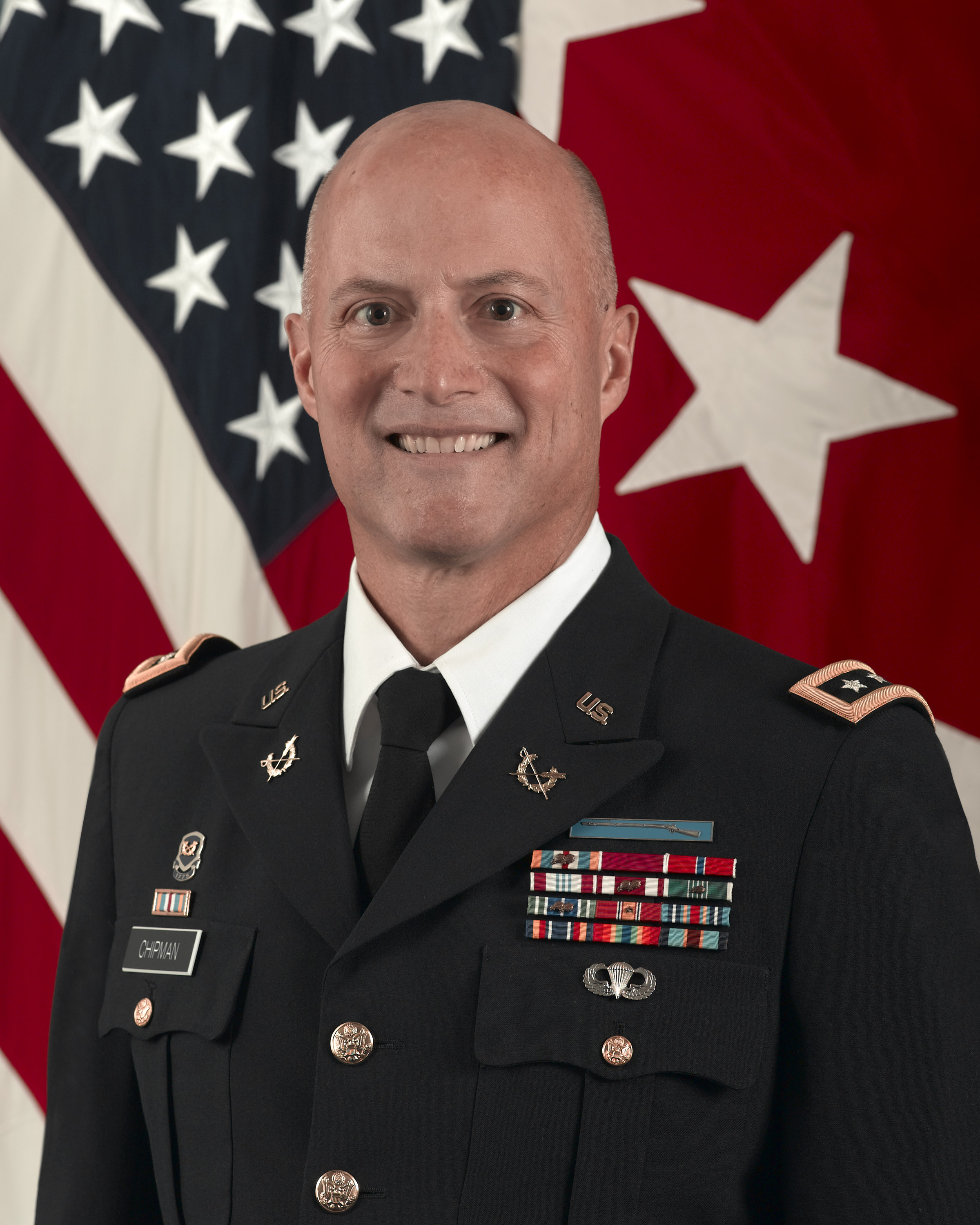
- Lieutenant General Dana Kyle Chipman; 38th United States Army Judge Advocate General
- Born: September 23, 1958 (age 68); Inglewood, California, U.S.
- Military career
- Allegiance: United States
- Branch: United States Army
- Service years: 1980–2013
- Rank: Lieutenant General
- Commands: U.S. Army J.A.G. Corps
- Conflicts: War on terror War in Afghanistan
- Awards: Def. Superior Service Medal; Legion of Merit; Bronze Star Medal

Lieutenant General Dana Kyle Chipman, USA (born September 23, 1958) is a retired American military lawyer who served from 2009 to 2013 as the Judge Advocate General of the United States Army.

== Early life ==
Chipman was born in Inglewood, California and graduated from H. L. Bourgeois High School in Gray, Louisiana. He then attended the United States Military Academy at West Point, earning a Bachelor of Science degree and commissioning as an infantry officer in 1980. He later earned a Juris Doctor degree from Stanford Law School in 1986. He also holds a Master of Laws degree from the Judge Advocate General's Legal Center and School and a Master of Science degree in Strategic Studies from the United States Army War College.

== Career ==
Chipman's first assignment was with 1st Battalion, 12th Infantry Regiment, 4th Infantry Division (Mechanized) at Fort Carson, Colorado, where he served as a Platoon Leader and Company Executive Officer until 1983. Upon completion of the Army's Funded Legal Education Program, he was assigned as a Legal Assistance and Claims Attorney, and as a Trial Counsel with the 3d Infantry Division (Mechanized) in Schweinfurt, Germany. In 1991, he was assigned to the U.S. Army Litigation Division in Washington, D.C., as a Litigation Attorney and Senior Litigation Attorney. He later served as the Detachment Judge Advocate, 1st Special Forces Operational Detachment – Delta (Airborne) at Fort Bragg, North Carolina.

He was next assigned as the Deputy Staff Judge Advocate, U.S. Army Infantry Center and Fort Benning, Georgia. In 1999, he returned to Fort Bragg to serve as Legal Advisor, Joint Special Operations Command. In 2001 and 2002, he deployed as the legal advisor to a Joint Special Operations Task Force for Operation Enduring Freedom. He served as the Staff Judge Advocate, U.S. Special Operations Command, MacDill Air Force Base, Florida, and then as Staff Judge Advocate, U.S. Central Command. He also served as the Commander and Commandant of The Judge Advocate General's Legal Center and School in Charlottesville, Virginia. On October 1, 2009, he was promoted to the rank of Lieutenant General and began serving as the 38th Judge Advocate General of the U.S. Army. Chipman completed the Infantry Officer Basic Course, the Judge Advocate Officer Basic and Graduate Courses, the Army Command and General Staff College, and the Army War College.

Chipman's awards include the Defense Superior Service Medal with two Oak Leaf Clusters, the Legion of Merit, the Bronze Star Medal, the Defense Meritorious Service Medal, the Meritorious Service Medal with two Oak Leaf Clusters, the Army Commendation Medal with one Oak Leaf Cluster, and the Army Achievement Medal with two Oak Leaf Clusters. He is also entitled to wear the Expert Infantryman Badge and the Parachutist Badge.

In August 2014, it was announced that Chipman will serve as the chief counsel for the Republican members of the United States House Select Committee on Events Surrounding the 2012 Terrorist Attack in Benghazi.

== Personal life ==
Chipman is married with three children.

Military offices
Preceded by Scott C. Black	Judge Advocate General of the United States Army; 2009 – 2013	Succeeded by Flora D. Darpino
