= Murder of Barry Winchell =

Murder of United States Army soldier

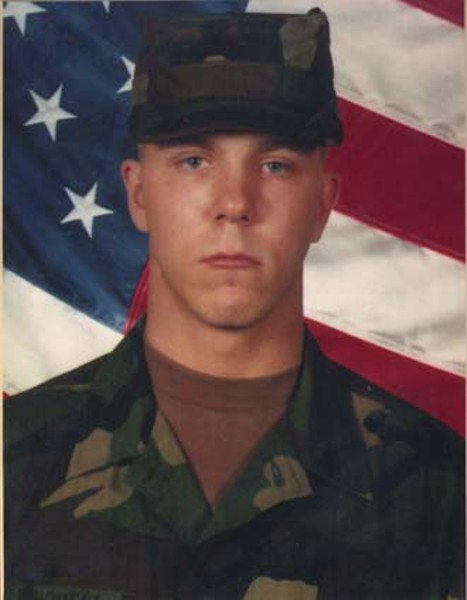
- Barry Winchell
- Location: Fort Campbell, Kentucky, U.S.
- Date: July 6, 1999; 27 years ago
- Attack type: Murder by bludgeoning
- Victims: Barry Winchell, aged 21
- Perpetrators: Calvin Neal Glover; Justin Robert Fisher
- Motive: over dating a trans woman; revenge after a previous physical altercation between Glover and Winchell
- Charges: Fisher (dropped after plea deal): Participating as a principal to premeditated murder; Accessory after the fact to premeditated murder
- Verdict: Glover Guilty; Fisher Pleaded guilty
- Convictions: Glover Premeditated murder; Fisher; Obstruction of justice (2 counts); Providing alcohol to a minor; False swearing (3 counts)
- Sentence: Glover Life imprisonment with the possibility of parole (1999; paroled in 2020); Fisher 12 1/2 years in prison (paroled after 7 years)

On July 6, 1999, Barry Winchell, a 21-year-old infantry soldier in the United States Army, was murdered while he slept outside of his barracks by fellow soldier Calvin Glover for dating a transgender woman, Calpernia Addams, after a physical altercation between the two. The murder became a point of reference in the debate about the policy known as "don't ask, don't tell", which did not allow members of the U.S. military who were homosexual, bisexual, or transgender to be open about their sexual orientation or gender identity.

== Biography of Winchell ==
A native of Missouri, Winchell enlisted in the Army in 1997 and was transferred in 1998 to Fort Campbell, Kentucky. As a Private First Class, he was assigned to the 2nd Battalion 502nd Infantry of the 101st Airborne Division. While stationed there, he received a Dear John letter from his high school sweetheart.

Winchell later accompanied his roommate, Spc. Justin Robert Fisher, 25, and other soldiers for an excursion to Nashville's downtown bars. In 1999, Fisher and others took Winchell to a Nashville club, The Connection, which featured transgender performers, where Winchell met a trans woman showgirl named Calpernia Addams. The two began to date. Fisher began to spread rumors of the relationship at Ft. Campbell. Winchell then became a target of harassment, which his superiors did almost nothing to stop.

== Perpetrators ==
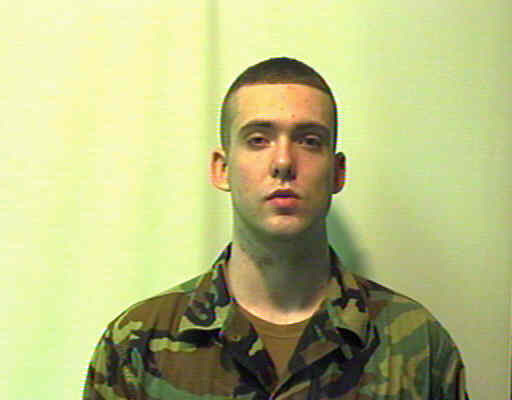
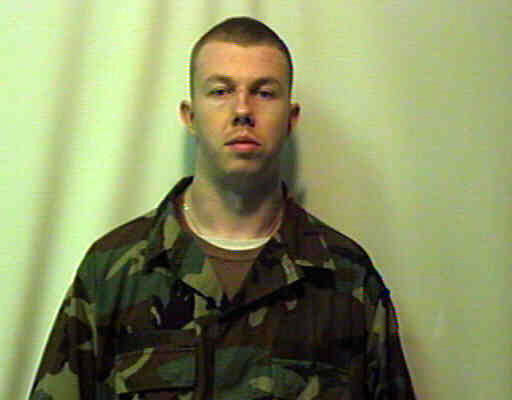
Perpetrators Calvin Glover (left) and Justin Fisher (right)

Calvin Neal Glover was born in Sulphur, Oklahoma. Justin Fisher was born in Lincoln, Nebraska.

Glover's parents separated when he was young, and he had a difficult upbringing. He often stayed at a youth home when his family was having issues. A psychologist later said Glover had low self-esteem and was more susceptible to alcohol abuse as a result. She also said he was easily influenced by others since he wanted attention.

When Glover was 13, he moved in with his father. "I saw an immediate change," his mother said. "He was out of control. He was drinking, and he was only 13. He wouldn't stay in school, and he was flunking. He was easily influenced by older people around him. He always ran with older groups." After Glover dropped out of school in 8th grade, his parents enrolled him in a youth counseling program. When he was 17, Glover joined the United States Army with his mother's permission.

== Murder ==
The harassment of Winchell was continuous until the Fourth of July weekend, when Winchell and fellow soldier Calvin Neal Glover, 18, fought after Winchell accused a boasting Glover of being a fraud. Both had been drinking beer throughout the day. Glover was soundly defeated by Winchell, and Fisher harassed Glover about being beaten by "'a fucking faggot' like Winchell". Fisher and Winchell had their own history of physical altercations as roommates in the barracks of Ft. Campbell. Fisher continued to goad Glover. Subsequently, in the early hours of July 5, 1999, Glover took a baseball bat from Fisher's locker and struck Winchell in the head with it as he slept on a cot outside near the entrance to the room Winchell shared with Fisher. Winchell died of massive head injuries on July 6 at the Vanderbilt University Medical Center.

Glover pleaded guilty to unpremeditated murder for killing Winchell. During his plea hearing, he said Fisher had goaded him into attacking Winchell and that he did not mean to kill him. Tearing up, Glover said "I was just so drunk ... and I had no intent for him to die. It was just a mistake, sir. ... I wasn't mad at him for any reason. I had nothing against him."

However, prosecutors decided to still take Glover to trial for premeditated murder. During the trial, his defense claimed Fisher had goaded him into committing the murder and that it was not intentional. "Fisher thought Glover would be an excellent candidate to get Pfc. Winchell", said defense attorney Captain Thomas Moshang. "He knew that Private Glover could be instigated. He was able to work him up, provoke him to the point that Glover said, 'Yeah, I'm going to hit him with this bat.'" The prosecution said Glover was still responsible for his own actions and that the murder was clearly intentional. Prosecutor Captain Gregg Engler said "It's premeditated – murder without a doubt. Glover is not a robot. Glover took the bat and went out there and killed Winchell. He intended to kill because of the massive, massive blows. The first blow. If not the first blow, the second. He could have walked away, but he didn't. He had a choice, and he chose to kill."

He faced a mandatory life sentence, with or without the possibility of parole. Arguing for a chance of parole, Glover's defense team pointed to his difficult upbringing, young age, and claimed that Fisher had used him as a pawn. After deliberating, military jurors decided to give Glover a chance at parole. A psychologist testified that he had gotten along with black youths and gay youths at his youth home, in contrast to previous claims that he was a racist homophobe.

Shortly before he was sentenced, Glover apologized to Winchell's family. His voice cracking, he said "If I had acted as half the man, even half the soldier as Barry was, he’d be with us right now. I have to apologize to Barry's parents. I'm deeply sorry for the pain I've brought your family. This is something that I'll have to remember for the rest of my life." Glover said he was drunk at the time of the murder and was recovering from alcoholism, and that he did not know why he attacked Winchell. He said he had found God in prison. Glover's attorneys continued to argue that Fisher had goaded him into attacking Winchell. Winchell's parents testified during the hearing, describing him as a loving, compassionate man who enjoyed the Army and wanted to become a helicopter pilot.

Fisher pleaded guilty to two counts of obstruction of justice, one count of providing alcohol to a minor, and three counts of false swearing and was sentenced to 12.5 years in prison. As part of his plea agreement, charges of participating as a principal to premeditated murder and being an accessory after the fact to premeditated murder were dropped. Although Winchell's family was satisfied with Glover's sentence, they were outraged by Fisher's sentence. Winchell's parents, Wally and Patricia Kutteles said "Suddenly, the Army let him plead to nothing related to the actual murder ... justice was not served today." C. Dixon Osburn, then the co-executive director of the OutServe-SLDN, decried the sentence as a "travesty". "We're left with huge questions about why Fort Campbell cut this deal", he said.

In addition to their sentences, Glover and Fisher were also both dishonorably discharged, reduced in rank to private, and ordered to forfeit all of their pay and benefits. They were incarcerated at the United States Disciplinary Barracks. Fisher was denied clemency in 2003, released to a halfway house in August 2006, and released from custody in October 2006. Glover was later transferred to a civilian prison and paroled on August 27, 2020.

== Aftermath ==
Winchell's murder led Secretary of Defense William Cohen to order a review of the "don't ask, don't tell" (DADT) policy, which some asserted was a significant factor in Winchell's harassment and murder. The Servicemembers Legal Defense Network was a prominent critic of how the policy was implemented, and they demanded to know who, in higher ranks, was responsible for the climate on base.

Winchell's parents, Wally and Patricia Kutteles continued to press for a re-examination of "don't ask, don't tell". Lieutenant General Timothy Maude, a point man on LGBTQ issues for the U.S. Army, visited with Patricia Kutteles. Despite campaigning by the Kutteleses and LGBT activist groups, the Commanding General of Fort Campbell at the time of the murder, Major General Robert T. Clark, refused to take responsibility for the purported anti-gay climate at Fort Campbell under his command. In May 2003, he met with Patricia Kutteles, who opposed his promotion, saying: "He doesn't have the command authority or responsibility. The promotion would be another obstacle in the way of everything we have tried to do to honor our son." His promotion to lieutenant general was delayed in October 2002 and May 2003. After being exonerated, he was nominated and approved for promotion to lieutenant general on December 5, 2003.

The 2003 film Soldier's Girl is based on Winchell's murder and the events leading up to it. Troy Garity portrays Winchell with Lee Pace playing Calpernia Addams. The film received a Peabody Award and numerous Emmy and Golden Globe nominations and sparked the renewed debate of the effects of DADT during Clark's promotion hearings.

== See also ==
- Violence against LGBT people
- Allen Schindler
