= Scott C. Black =

United States Army general

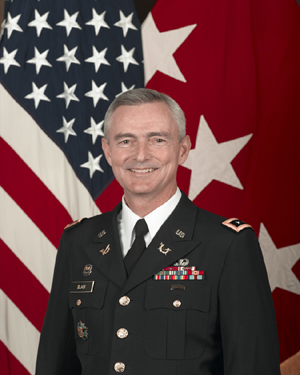
- Lieutenant General Scott C. Black; 37th Judge Advocate General of the United States Army
- Born: September 1, 1952 (age 74); Lompoc, California, U.S.
- Military career
- Allegiance: United States of America
- Branch: United States Army
- Service years: 1974–2009
- Rank: Lieutenant general
- Commands: U.S. Army J.A.G. Corps
- Conflicts: War on terror
- Awards: Distinguished Service Medal; Legion of Merit; Meritorious Service Medal

Lieutenant General Scott C. Black (born September 1, 1952) is a retired American military lawyer who was the Judge Advocate General of the United States Army from October 1, 2005, to October 1, 2009. He was the first lieutenant general to hold that position.

== Biography ==
Black grew up traveling the world in a military family. He graduated from California Polytechnic State University with a B.A. degree in political science. During his undergraduate education, he was a member of the Phi Kappa Psi fraternity, California Eta chapter. Following graduation, Black was commissioned through the ROTC program as an Armor officer. After three years at Fort Ord, California, he went to California Western School of Law in San Diego, where he earned a J.D. Black also holds an M.S. degree in national resource strategy from the National Defense University.

Black's first duty assignment as a judge advocate was at Fort Bliss, Texas, where he served as the chief of the Legal Assistance Branch, as a trial counsel and chief of the Criminal Law Branch, and as a contract attorney. He later served in Washington, D.C., as a general law attorney at the Office of The Judge Advocate General of the Army and as an assistant counsel to the President at the White House.

In 1990, Black was assigned as the deputy staff judge advocate, 7th Infantry Division (Light), Fort Ord. From there, he went on to be the chief of the Military and Civil Law Division, United States Army Europe and Seventh Army, Germany. Black's next assignment was as the staff judge advocate, 3d Infantry Division (later redesignated 1st Infantry Division), United States Army Europe and Seventh Army, Germany.

In July 1996, Black returned to the United States as the legislative counsel and later as chief of the Investigations and Legislative Division, Office of the Chief Legislative Liaison (United States Army). He then served as chief of personnel, plans, and training Office and later as the staff judge advocate of V Corps, United States Army Europe and Seventh Army. From 2001 to 2003, Black served as the assistant judge advocate general for military law and operations, and from 2003 to 2005 as the commanding general and commandant of The Judge Advocate General's Legal Center and School. In October 2005, Black was appointed the 37th judge advocate general of the United States Army. On December 8, 2008, the United States Senate voted to confirm the nomination of Black for promotion to the rank of lieutenant general. He was officially promoted to that rank on December 11, 2008, at the Pentagon.

Black attended the Judge Advocate Basic and Graduate courses, the Army Command and General Staff College, and the Industrial College of the Armed Forces.

His awards include the Distinguished Service Medal, Legion of Merit with Oak Leaf Cluster, Meritorious Service Medal with four Oak Leaf Clusters, Army Commendation Medal with Oak Leaf Cluster, and the Army Achievement Medal with Oak Leaf Cluster. He is also entitled to wear the Parachutist Badge, the Ranger Tab, and the Army Staff Identification Badge.

Black is married and has four children.

== Gallery ==
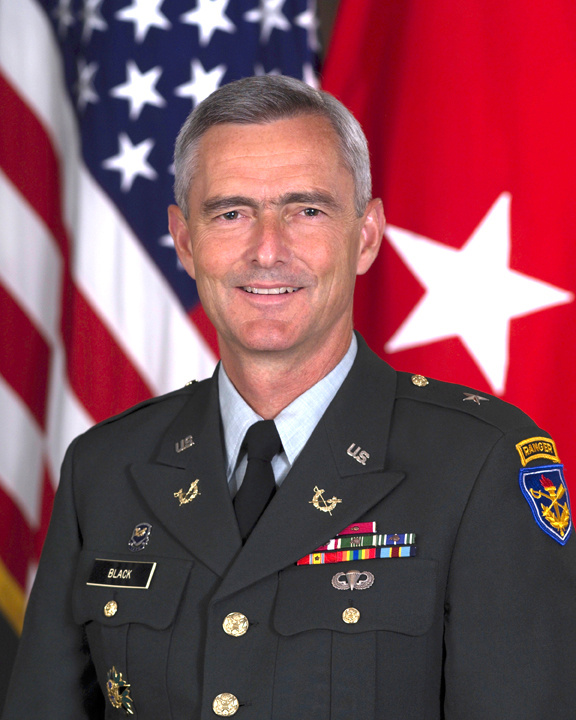

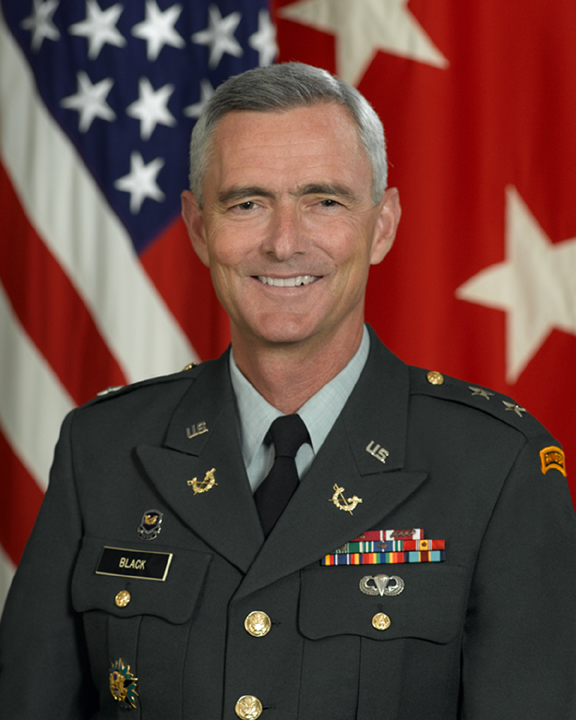

Military offices
Preceded by Thomas J. Romig	Judge Advocate General of the United States Army; 2005–2009	Succeeded by Dana K. Chipman
