= Robert T. Clark =

United States Army general

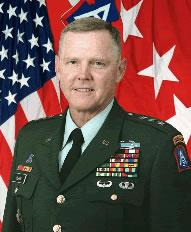
- LTG Robert T. Clark
- Military career
- Allegiance: United States
- Branch: United States Army
- Service years: 1970–2006
- Rank: Lieutenant General
- Commands: Fifth United States Army; 101st Airborne Division; 3d Battalion, 187th Infantry
- Conflicts: Vietnam War; Gulf War
- Awards: Army Distinguished Service Medal; Legion of Merit (5); Bronze Star Medal (3); Purple Heart

Lieutenant General Robert T. Clark is a retired United States Army officer. His last assignment was as the Commanding General, Fifth United States Army (later United States Army North) which he commanded from December 5, 2003, to December 2006.

== Education ==
Clark is a graduate of Douglas MacArthur High School, San Antonio, Texas, and a 1970 Distinguished Military Graduate of Texas Tech University, where he was commissioned as an army second lieutenant and awarded a Bachelor of Arts degree in history. He later earned a Master of Science Degree in political science from Auburn University at Montgomery.

Clark's military education includes the Infantry Officer Basic Course, Infantry Officer Advanced Course, Air Command and Staff College, New Zealand Army Staff and Tactics Course, National War College, and the Joint Flag Officer Warfighting Course.

== Military career ==
After a brief initial assignment at Fort Hood, Clark served in Vietnam as a Rifle Platoon Leader and Company Executive Officer with the 1st Cavalry Division. He was then assigned to the 9th Infantry Division at Fort Lewis, Washington, where he commanded a Rifle Company. After the Infantry Officer Advanced Course, he commanded another rifle company in the 25th Infantry Division at Schofield Barracks, Hawaii, and later served as the Battalion Operations Officer. He was assigned to the Pentagon as a staff officer in the Office of the Deputy Chief of Staff for Operations and Plans and then became the Aide-de-Camp to the Chief of Staff of the Army.

Clark was assigned to the 101st Airborne Division (Air Assault), where he commanded the 3d Battalion, 187th Infantry, and later commanded the 3d Brigade during Operations Desert Shield and Desert Storm. After brigade command, he became chief of staff of the 101st Airborne Division (Air Assault). Following his promotion to brigadier general, he became the Assistant Division Commander for Operations of the 25th Infantry Division (Light) at Schofield Barracks, Hawaii, followed by an assignment at Fort Benning as the Assistant Commandant of the Infantry School and the Deputy Commanding General. He then became the Deputy Chief of Staff for Combat Developments, United States Army Training and Doctrine Command at Fort Monroe. He then returned to Fort Campbell, Kentucky, where he served as the Commanding General of the 101st Airborne Division (Air Assault) and Fort Campbell from February 1998 to June 2000.

During his tenure as commander, Private First Class Barry Winchell was murdered by two Fort Campbell soldiers on suspicion of Winchell's homosexuality. Because of this and other incidents at Fort Campbell, Clark's promotion to lieutenant general was opposed by groups such as the National Organization for Women and was delayed pending two Executive Sessions by the U.S. Senate Armed Services Committee. The official Defense Department reports and the Senate Armed Services Committee exonerated Clark of wrongdoing, and he received his promotion in November 2003.

After his tour at Fort Campbell, Clark was assigned as the Deputy Commanding General, Fifth United States Army. Upon his promotion to lieutenant general, he commanded Fifth Army until December 2006. He retired from active duty on January 31, 2007.

== Personal life ==
Clark is married and has a daughter and a son.

== Awards and decorations ==
Clark's decorations and badges include the Army Distinguished Service Medal, Legion of Merit with four Oak Leaf Clusters, Bronze Star Medal with V Device and two Oak Leaf Clusters, Purple Heart, Meritorious Service Medal with three Oak Leaf Clusters, Air Medal, Army Commendation Medal, Combat Infantryman Badge, Parachutist Badge, Air Assault Badge, Ranger Tab, and Army Staff Identification Badge.

- Distinguished Service Medal
- Legion of Merit with four Oak Leaf Clusters
- Bronze Star with two Oak Leaf Clusters
- Purple Heart
- Meritorious Service Medal with three Oak Leaf Clusters
- Air Medal
- Army Commendation Medal
- Combat Infantryman Badge
- Parachutist Badge
- Air Assault Badge
- Ranger Tab
- Army Staff Identification Badge
- In 2007, the MacArthur High School JROTC Program renamed their armory after Clark.
