= James R. Helmly =

United States Army general

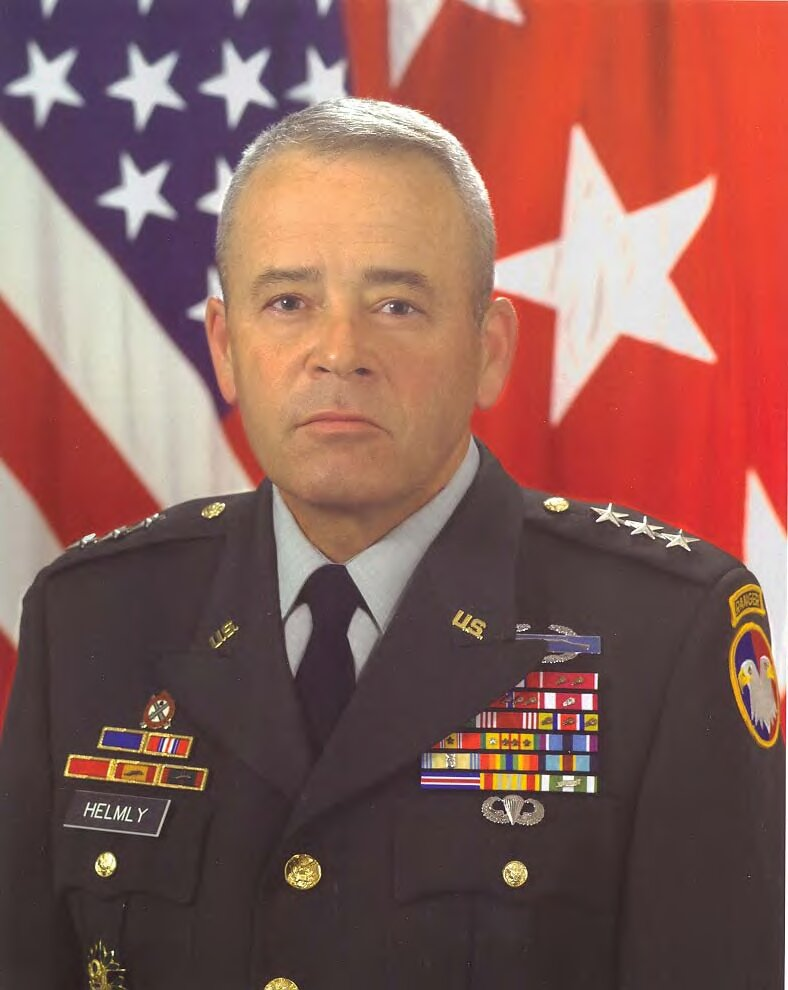
Official portrait

James Ronald "Ron" Helmly (born September 25, 1947) is a retired lieutenant general in the United States Army, and, until May 2006, was the commander of the United States Army Reserve.

Helmly was raised in Savannah, Georgia and graduated from Robert W. Groves High School in 1965. He dropped out of Armstrong State College and joined the Army in August 1966. After completing Officer Candidate School, Helmly was commissioned on August 24, 1967. He served two combat tours in Vietnam and later completed a B.A. degree in liberal studies at the State University of New York in Albany.

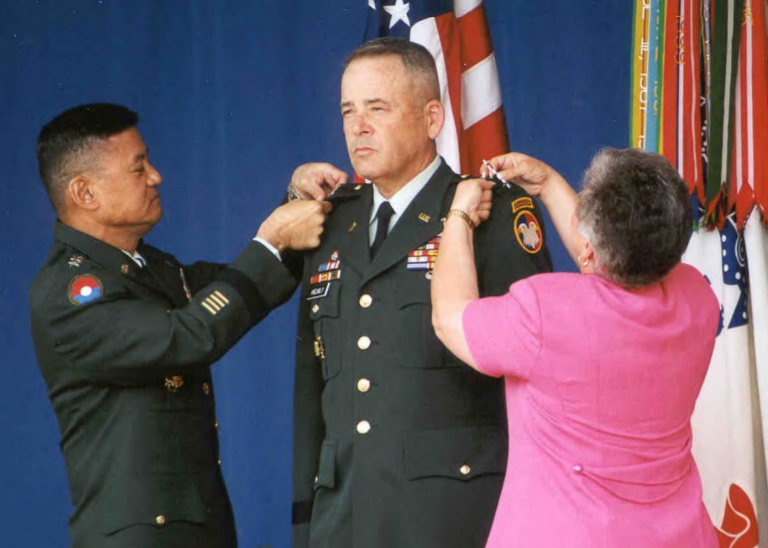
Lieutenant General James R. Helmly (center), chief of the Army Reserve, has his three-star rank pinned on by Army Chief of Staff General Eric K. Shinseki and Maria Helmly, May 29, 2002, at the Pentagon.

On December 20, 2004, Helmly authored a memo in which he described the policies for mobilizing the Reserve "dysfunctional." He reportedly believes that members of the Army Reserve are being treated too delicately, and states that the current state of affairs "threatens to unhinge an already precariously balanced situation in which we are losing as many soldiers through no use as we are through the fear of overuse."

Military offices
Preceded by Thomas J. Plewes	Commanding General, United States Army Reserve; May 25, 2002 - May 25, 2006	Succeeded by Jack C. Stultz
