= Michael Rochelle =

United States Army general

Michael D. Rochelle
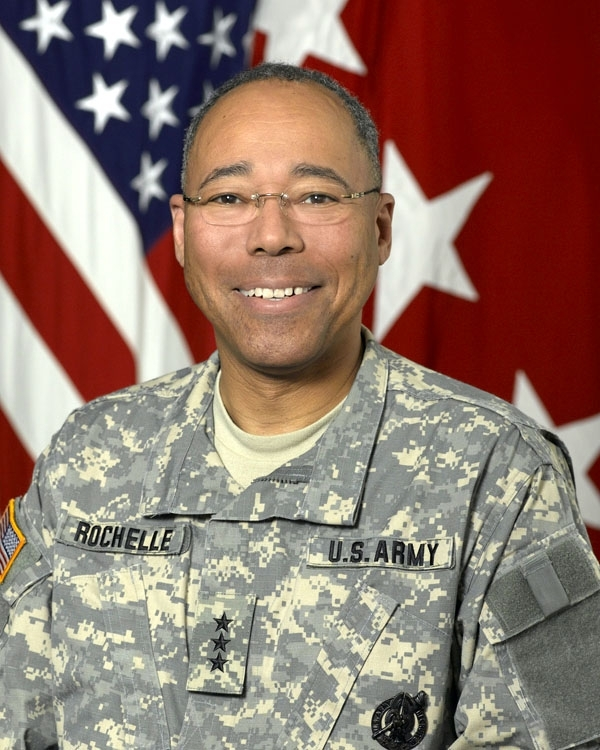
- Born: 1950 (age 75–76)
- Military career
- Allegiance: United States of America
- Branch: United States Army
- Rank: Lieutenant general
- Commands: Soldier Support Institute, Army Recruiting Command, Army Deputy Chief of Staff, G-1

Michael D. Rochelle (born 1950) is a retired United States Army lieutenant general, who served as deputy chief of staff, G-1 in the Department of the Army.

== Early life and education ==
After graduating Central High School in Providence, Rhode Island, he enrolled at Norfolk State University in Norfolk, Virginia, where he was a member of the National Society of Pershing Rifles and earned a Bachelor of Arts Degree in foreign language education in 1972. While enrolled and finishing his degree at Norfolk State University, he concurrently completed the Advanced ROTC program and was commissioned as a Regular Army officer in June 1972. To augment his bachelor's degree, LTG Rochelle later attended Shippensburg University, where he earned a Master of Arts Degree in public administration. His military education includes the Army War College, Army Command and General Staff College, Field Artillery Officer Basic Course, and the Adjutant General Officer Basic and Advanced Courses.

== Career ==
His command assignments included commander of the 226th Adjutant General Company (Postal) in Munich, Germany; the U.S. Military Entrance Processing Station, Portland, Maine; the Brunswick Recruiting Battalion (now the New England Recruiting Battalion), Brunswick, Maine; the U.S. Army Garrison at Fort Monroe, Virginia; the U.S. Army Soldier Support Institute, Fort Jackson, South Carolina; and the commanding general, U.S. Army Recruiting Command, Fort Knox, Kentucky.

Rochelle's staff assignments included operations officer, professional development officer, and ultimately as deputy chief, General Officer Management Office, Office of the Chief of Staff Army, Headquarters Department of the Army; between commanding the Brunswick Recruiting Battalion and as the garrison commander at Fort Monroe, Lieutenant General Rochelle served as the Division G-1 and adjutant general of the 101st Airborne Division (Air Assault); and he served as the senior military assistant to the Deputy Secretary of Defense, the Honorable John J. Hamre, and later as the special assistant to the deputy chief of staff for personnel. He served as the director of the U.S. Army Installation Management Agency (IMA). He assumed duties as the deputy chief of staff, G-1, United States Army, in June 2006.

== Awards and decorations ==
=== Military ===
- Defense Distinguished Service Medal
- Army Distinguished Service Medal with Oak Leaf Cluster
- Defense Superior Service Medal
- Legion of Merit with three Oak Leaf Clusters
- Defense Meritorious Service Medal
- Meritorious Service Medal with two Oak Leaf Clusters
- Army Commendation Medal with three Oak Leaf Clusters
- Joint Services Achievement Medal
- Recruiter Badge
- Office of Secretary of Defense Staff Identification Badge
- Joint Chiefs of Staff Identification Badge
- Army General Staff Identification Badge

=== Civilian ===
- Academy of Distinguished Alumni Norfolk State University
- NAACP Barrier Breaker Award
- Inductee, Boys and Girls Clubs of America Hall of Fame

== Personal life ==
Since his retirement from the U.S. Army, he founded and is president and CEO, of MDR Strategies, LLC a strategic human capital consulting firm located in northern Virginia.
