= List of United States Army lieutenant generals from 1990 to 1999 =

Flag of an Army lieutenant general

The rank of lieutenant general (or three-star general) is the second-highest rank normally achievable in the United States Army, and the first to have a specified number of appointments set by statute. It ranks above major general (two-star general) and below general (four-star general).

There have been 146 lieutenant generals in the U.S. Army from 1990 to 1999, 28 of whom were promoted to four-star general. All 146 achieved that rank while on active duty in the U.S. Army. Lieutenant generals entered the Army via several paths: 67 were commissioned via Reserve Officers' Training Corps (ROTC) at a civilian university, 42 via the U.S. Military Academy (USMA), 19 via Officer Candidate School (OCS), 15 via ROTC at a senior military college, two via direct commission (direct), and one via the U.S. Naval Academy (USNA).

== List of generals ==
Entries in the following list of lieutenant generals are indexed by the numerical order in which each officer was promoted to that rank while on active duty, or by an asterisk (*) if the officer did not serve in that rank while on active duty in the U.S. Army or was promoted to four-star rank while on active duty in the U.S. Army. Each entry lists the general's name, date of rank, (Note: Dates of rank are taken, where available, from the U.S. Army register of active and retired commissioned officers, or the Defense Technical Information Center roster of general and flag officers. The date listed is that of the officer's first promotion to lieutenant general. If such a date cannot be found, the next date substituted should be that of the officer's assumption of his/her first three-star appointment. Failing which, the officer's first Senate confirmation date to lieutenant general should be substituted. For officers promoted to lieutenant general on the same date, they should be organized first by date of promotion to four-star rank, and then by the tier of their first listed assignment upon promotion to lieutenant general.) active-duty positions held while serving at three-star rank, (Note: Positions listed are those held by the officer when promoted to lieutenant general. Dates listed are for the officer's full tenure, which may predate promotion to three-star rank or postdate retirement from active duty. Positions held in an acting capacity are italicized.) number of years of active-duty service at three-star rank (Yrs), (Note: The number of years of active-duty service at three-star rank is approximated by subtracting the year in the "Date of rank" column from the last year in the "Position" column. Time spent between active-duty three-star assignments is not counted.) year commissioned and source of commission, (Note: Sources of commission are listed in parentheses after the year of commission and include: the United States Military Academy (USMA); Reserve Officer Training Corps (ROTC) at a civilian university; ROTC at a senior military college such as the Virginia Military Institute (VMI), Norwich University (Norwich), Pennsylvania Military College (PMC), University of North Georgia (UNG), or Widener University (Widener); Officer Candidate School (OCS); the U.S. Naval Academy (USNA); the Army National Guard (ARNG); and direct commission (direct).) number of years in commission when promoted to three-star rank (YC), (Note: The number of years in commission before being promoted to three-star rank is approximated by subtracting the year in the "Commission" column from the year in the "Date of rank" column.) and other biographical notes. (Note: Notes include years of birth and death; awards of the Medal of Honor, Congressional Gold Medal, Presidential Medal of Freedom, or honors of similar significance; major government appointments; university presidencies or equivalents; familial relationships with significant military officers or government officials such as U.S. Presidents, cabinet secretaries, U.S. Senators, or state governors; and unusual career events such as premature relief or death in office.)

List of U.S. Army lieutenant generals from 1990 to 1999
#	Name	Photo	Date of rank	Position	Yrs	Commission	YC	Notes
1	Charles P. Otstott		27 Jan 1990	Deputy Chairman, NATO Military Committee (DCMC), 1990–1992.	2	1960 (USMA)	30	(1937– )
2	James W. Crysel		27 Feb 1990	Commanding General, Second U.S. Army, 1990–1992.	2	1959 (ROTC)	31	(1937– )
3	Marvin D. Brailsford		11 Jun 1990	Deputy Commanding General, Materiel Readiness, U.S. Army Materiel Command/U.S. Department of Defense Executive Director for Conventional Ammunition Readiness (DCG-MR AMC/EXD-CAR), 1990–1992.	2	1959 (ROTC)	31	(1939– )
*	Dennis J. Reimer		1 Jul 1990	Deputy Chief of Staff, Operations and Plans, Army Staff/Senior Army Representative, U.N. Military Staff Committee (DCSOPS/Sr. Army Rep), 1990–1991.	1	1962 (USMA)	28	(1939– ) (Note: Served as a commander-in-chief (CINC).) (Note: Served as Vice Chief of Staff, U.S. Army (VCSA).) (Note: Served as Chief of Staff, U.S. Army (CSA).) Promoted to general, 21 Jun 1991.
4	Alonzo E. Short Jr.		1 Jul 1990	Commanding General, U.S. Army Information Systems Command (CG USAISEC), 1990–1991.; Director, Defense Information Systems Agency (DIRDISA), 1991–1994.	4	1962 (ROTC)	28	(1939– )
5	Michael F. Spigelmire		1 Jul 1990	Commanding General, U.S. Army Special Operations Command (CG USASOC), 1990–1991.; Commanding General, VII Corps, 1991–1992.	2	1960 (ROTC)	30	(1938– ) Deputy Director of Operations, Atlanta Committee for the Olympic Games, 1996.
6	Billy M. Thomas		9 Jul 1990	Deputy Commanding General, Research, Development and Acquisition, U.S. Army Materiel Command (DCG-R&D AMC), 1990–1992.	2	1962 (ROTC)	28	(1940–2016)
7	William H. Reno		1 Aug 1990	Deputy Chief of Staff, Personnel, Army Staff (DCSPER), 1990–1992.	2	1961 (USMA)	29	(1936– )
8	Teddy G. Allen		1 Sep 1990	Director, Defense Security Assistance Agency (DIRDSAA), 1990–1993.	3	1958 (ROTC)	32	(1936– )
*	David M. Maddox		9 Nov 1990	Commanding General, V Corps, 1990–1992.	2	1960 (VMI)	30	(1938– ) Promoted to general, 9 Jul 1992.
9	Robert D. Chelberg		1 Jan 1991	Chief of Staff, U.S. European Command (COFS USEUCOM), 1991–1993.	2	1961 (USMA)	30	(1938– )
10	William G. Pagonis		7 Feb 1991	Commanding General, 22nd Theater Army Area Command, 1990–1992.; Deputy Commanding General, Materiel Readiness, U.S. Army Materiel Command/U.S. Department of Defense Executive Director for Conventional Ammunition Readiness (DCG-MR AMC/EXD-CAR), 1992.; Commanding General, 21st Theater Army Area Command, 1992–1993.	2	1964 (ROTC)	27	(1941– )
11	James H. Johnson Jr.		30 May 1991	Commanding General, First U.S. Army (CG FUSA), 1991–1993.	2	1960 (USMA)	31	(1937–2023)
12	Harold T. Fields Jr.		5 Jun 1991	Deputy Commander in Chief/Chief of Staff, U.S. Pacific Command (DCINCPAC), 1991–1994.; Commander in Chief, U.S. Pacific Command (CINCPAC), 1994.	3	1960 (Citadel)	31	(1938– )
13	James D. Starling		17 Jun 1991	Deputy Commander in Chief, U.S. Transportation Command (DCINCTRANS), 1991–1993.	2	1960 (USMA)	31	(1936–2009)
*	J. H. Binford Peay III		24 Jun 1991	Deputy Chief of Staff, Operations and Plans, Army Staff/Senior Army Representative, U.N. Military Staff Committee (DCSOPS/Sr. Army Rep), 1991–1993.	2	1962 (VMI)	29	(1940– ) Promoted to general, 26 Mar 1993. Superintendent, Virginia Military Institute, 2003–2020.
14	Merle Freitag		1 Jul 1991	Comptroller, U.S. Army, 1991–1994.	3	1962 (ROTC)	29	(1940– )
*	Ronald H. Griffith		1 Aug 1991	Inspector General, U.S. Army (IG), 1991–1995.	4	1960 (ROTC)	31	(1936–2018) Promoted to general, 6 Jun 1995.
15	Joseph S. Laposata		1 Aug 1991	Chief of Staff, Allied Forces Southern Europe (COFS AFSOUTH), 1991–1993.	2	1960 (ROTC)	31	(1938–2018)
16	Horace G. Taylor		1 Aug 1991	Commanding General, III Corps, 1991–1993.	2	1960 (ROTC)	31	(1937–2024)
*	Wayne A. Downing		5 Aug 1991	Commanding General, U.S. Army Special Operations Command (CG USASOC), 1991–1993.	2	1962 (USMA)	29	(1940–2007) Promoted to general, 20 May 1993. Deputy National Security Advisor for Combating Terrorism, 2001–2002.
17	Wilson A. Shoffner Sr.		16 Aug 1991	Commanding General, U.S. Army Combined Arms Command/Commandant, U.S. Army Command and General Staff College/Deputy Commanding General, Combined Arms, U.S. Army Training and Doctrine Command (CG CAC/CMDT CGSC/DCG-CA TRADOC), 1991–1993.	2	1961 (ROTC)	30	(1938–2014) Father of Army major general Wilson A. Shoffner Jr.
18	Peter A. Kind		21 Aug 1991	Commanding General, U.S. Army Information Systems Command (CG USAISEC), 1991–1992.; Director, Information Systems for Command, Control, Communications and Computers (DISC4), 1992–1994.	3	1957 (ROTC)	34	(1939– )
19	Paul G. Cerjan		1 Oct 1991	Deputy Commander in Chief, U.S. Army Europe and Seventh Army (DCINCUSAREUR), 1991–1992.; President, National Defense University (P-NDU), 1992–1994.	3	1960 (USMA)	31	(1938–2011) Commandant, U.S. Army War College, 1989–1991; President, Regent University, 1998–2000.
20	Glynn C. Mallory Jr.		1 Oct 1991	Commanding General, Sixth U.S. Army, 1991–1995.	4	1961 (USMA)	30	(1939–2020)
21	Ira C. Owens		1 Dec 1991	Deputy Chief of Staff, Intelligence, Army Staff (DCSINT), 1991–1995.	4	1960 (OCS)	31	(1936– )
22	Neal T. Jaco		1 Dec 1991	Commanding General, Fifth U.S. Army, 1991–1994.	3	1959 (ROTC)	32	(1937– )
23	Carmen J. Cavezza		1 Dec 1991	Commanding General, I Corps, 1991–1994.	3	1961 (Citadel)	30	(1937– )
24	Samuel N. Wakefield		9 Jan 1992	Commanding General, U.S. Army Combined Arms Support Command/Deputy Commanding General, Combined Arms Support, U.S. Army Training and Doctrine Command (CG CASCOM/DCG-CAS TRADOC), 1992–1994.	2	1960 (Citadel)	32	(1938– )
25	Charles E. Dominy		1 Feb 1992	Director, Army Staff (DAS), 1992–1995.	3	1962 (USMA)	30	(1940–2023)
26	Jerome H. Granrud		1 Feb 1992	Commanding General, U.S. Army Japan/Commanding General, IX Corps (CG USARJ), 1992–1994.	2	1960 (ROTC)	32	(1937–2020)
27	Thomas P. Carney		3 Mar 1992	Deputy Chief of Staff, Personnel, Army Staff (DCSPER), 1992–1994.	2	1963 (USMA)	29	(1941–2019)
*	Barry R. McCaffrey		19 Jun 1992	Assistant to the Chairman of the Joint Chiefs of Staff (ACJCS), 1992–1993.; Director, Strategic Plans and Policy, Joint Staff, J5/Senior Member, U.S. Delegation to the U.N. Military Staff Committee (Sr. Member MSC), 1993–1994.	2	1964 (USMA)	28	(1942– ) Promoted to general, 17 Feb 1994. Director, National Drug Control Policy, 1996–2001. Son of Army major general William J. McCaffrey.
*	William W. Crouch		3 Jul 1992	Commanding General, Eighth U.S. Army/Chief of Staff, United Nations Command, ROK/U.S. Combined Forces Command and U.S. Forces Korea (CG EUSA/COFS UNC/CFC/USFK), 1992–1994.	3	1963 (ROTC)	29	(1941–2024) Promoted to general, 1 Jan 1995.
28	Jerry R. Rutherford Jr.		3 Jul 1992	Commanding General, V Corps, 1992–1995.	3	1962 (ROTC)	30	(c. 1943– )
29	James R. Ellis		17 Jul 1992	Deputy Commander in Chief, Forces Command/Commanding General, Third U.S. Army/Commanding General, U.S. Army Forces Central Command (DCINCFOR/CG TUSA/CG USARCENT), 1992–1993.; Deputy Commanding General, U.S. Army Forces Command/Commanding General, Third U.S. Army/Commanding General, U.S. Army Forces Central Command (DCG FORSCOM/CG TUSA/CG USARCENT), 1993–1994.	2	1962 (USMA)	30	(1937– )
30	Alfred J. Mallette		22 Jul 1992	Deputy Director General, NATO Integrated Communications and Information Systems Agency (DDGNCISA), 1992–1994.	2	1961 (ROTC)	31	(1938–1994) Died in office.
31	Samuel E. Ebbesen		3 Aug 1992	Commanding General, Second U.S. Army, 1992–1994.; Deputy Assistant Secretary of Defense for Military Personnel Policy, 1994–1997.	5	1961 (ROTC)	31	(1938– )
32	Leo J. Pigaty		13 Aug 1992	Deputy Commanding General, Research, Development and Acquisition, U.S. Army Materiel Command (DCG-R&D AMC), 1992–1994.	2	1961 (ROTC)	31	(1940– )
33	Daniel R. Schroeder		16 Aug 1992	Deputy Commander in Chief, U.S. Army Europe and Seventh Army (DCINCUSAREUR), 1992–1995.	3	1961 (USNA)	31	(1938– )
34	Donald M. Lionetti		24 Aug 1992	Commanding General, U.S. Army Space and Strategic Defense Command (CG USASSDC), 1992–1994.	2	1961 (USMA)	31	(1940–2019)
35	William H. Forster Sr.		28 Aug 1992	Military Deputy to the Assistant Secretary of the Army for Research, Development and Acquisition (MD(ASA(RDA)), 1992–1995.	3	1960 (ROTC)	32	(1939– )
36	Arthur E. Williams		1 Sep 1992	U.S. Army Chief of Engineers/Commanding General, U.S. Army Corps of Engineers (CoE/CG USACE), 1992–1996.	4	1960 (ROTC)	32	(1938– )
37	Alcide M. Lanoue		8 Sep 1992	Surgeon General, U.S. Army (TSG), 1992–1993.; Surgeon General, U.S. Army/Commanding General, U.S. Army Medical Command (TSG/CG MEDCOM), 1993–1996.	4	1957 (ROTC)	35	(1934–2021)
*	John H. Tilelli Jr.		26 Mar 1993	Deputy Chief of Staff, Operations and Plans, Army Staff/Senior Army Representative, U.N. Military Staff Committee (DCSOPS/Sr. Army Rep), 1993–1994.	1	1963 (PMC) (Note: Graduated from Pennsylvania Military College, which was reorganized as a civilian institution in 1972 and is now Widener University.)	30	(1941– ) Promoted to general, 19 Jul 1994.
38	Marvin L. Covault		21 May 1993	Chief of Staff, Allied Forces Southern Europe (COFS AFSOUTH), 1993–1995.	2	1962 (ROTC)	31	(1940– )
39	James T. Scott		1 Jun 1993	Commanding General, U.S. Army Special Operations Command (CG USASOC), 1993–1996.	3	1964 (Texas A&M)	29	(1942– )
*	H. Hugh Shelton		7 Jun 1993	Commanding General, XVIII Airborne Corps, 1993–1994.; Commanding General, XVIII Airborne Corps/Commander, Joint Task Force 120 (CDRJTF-120), 1994–1995.; Commanding General, XVIII Airborne Corps, 1995–1996.	3	1964 (ROTC)	29	(1942– ) (Note: Served as Chairman, Joint Chiefs of Staff (CJCS).) Promoted to general, 1 Mar 1996. Awarded Congressional Gold Medal, 2002.
40	Richard F. Keller		1 Jul 1993	Chief of Staff, U.S. European Command (COFS USEUCOM), 1993–1996.	3	1961 (ROTC)	32	(c. 1942– )
41	John E. Miller		1 Aug 1993	Commanding General, U.S. Army Combined Arms Command/Commandant, U.S. Army Command and General Staff College/Deputy Commanding General, Combined Arms, U.S. Army Training and Doctrine Command (CG CAC/CMDT CGSC/DCG-CA TRADOC), 1993–1995.; Commanding General, U.S. Army Combined Arms Center/Commandant, U.S. Army Command and General Staff College/Deputy Commanding General, Combined Arms, U.S. Army Training and Doctrine Command (CG USACAC/CMDT CGSC/DCG-CA TRADOC), 1995.; Deputy Commanding General, U.S. Army Training and Doctrine Command (DCG TRADOC), 1995–1997.	4	1963 (ROTC)	30	(1941– )
*	William W. Hartzog		6 Aug 1993	Deputy Commander in Chief/Chief of Staff, U.S. Atlantic Command (DCINCACOM), 1993–1994.	1	1963 (Citadel)	30	(1941–2020) Promoted to general, 1 Dec 1994.
42	Thomas G. Rhame		1 Sep 1993	Director, Defense Security Assistance Agency (DIRDSAA), 1993–1997.	4	1963 (ROTC)	30	(1941–2023)
43	Kenneth R. Wykle		1 Oct 1993	Deputy Commander in Chief, U.S. Transportation Command (DCINCTRANS), 1993–1995.	2	1963 (ROTC)	30	(1941– ) Administrator, Federal Highway Administration, 1997–2001.
44	Daniel W. Christman		1 Oct 1993	U.S. Military Representative, NATO Military Committee (USMILREP), 1993–1994.; Assistant to the Chairman of the Joint Chiefs of Staff (ACJCS), 1994–1996.; Superintendent, U.S. Military Academy, 1996–2001.	8	1965 (USMA)	28	(1943– )
45	John P. Otjen		1 Oct 1993	Commanding General, First U.S. Army (CG FUSA), 1993–1995.	2	1964 (USMA)	29	(1942– )
46	Paul E. Funk		1 Nov 1993	Commanding General, III Corps, 1993–1995.	2	1961 (ROTC)	32	(1940– ) Father of Army four-star general Paul E. Funk II.
47	Robert L. Ord III		19 Nov 1993	Commanding General, U.S. Army Pacific (CG USARPAC), 1993–1996.	3	1962 (USMA)	31	(1940– )
48	Malcolm R. O'Neill		1 Dec 1993	Director, Ballistic Missile Defense Organization (DIRBMDO), 1993–1996.	3	1962 (ROTC)	31	(1940– ) U.S. Assistant Secretary of the Army for Acquisition, Logistics, and Technology, 2010–2011.
*	Johnnie E. Wilson		9 Feb 1994	Deputy Chief of Staff, Logistics, Army Staff (DCSLOG), 1994–1996.	2	1967 (OCS)	27	(1944– ) Promoted to general, 1 May 1996.
49	Marc A. Cisneros		1 Mar 1994	Commanding General, Fifth U.S. Army, 1994–1996.	2	1961 (ROTC)	33	(1939– )
*	Wesley K. Clark		4 Apr 1994	Director, Strategic Plans and Policy, Joint Staff, J5/Senior Member, U.S. Delegation to the U.N. Military Staff Committee (Sr. Member MSC), 1994–1996.	2	1966 (USMA)	28	(1944– ) (Note: Served as Supreme Allied Commander Europe (SACEUR).) Promoted to general, 21 Jun 1996. Candidate for Democratic Party nomination for U.S. President, 2004. Awarded Presidential Medal of Freedom, 2000.
*	John G. Coburn		15 Jul 1994	Deputy Commanding General, Research, Development and Acquisition, U.S. Army Materiel Command (DCG-R&D AMC), 1994–1995.; Deputy Commanding General, U.S. Army Materiel Command (DCG AMC), 1995–1996.; Deputy Chief of Staff, Logistics, Army Staff (DCSLOG), 1996–1999.	5	1963 (ROTC)	31	(1941– ) Promoted to general, 14 May 1999.
50	Steven L. Arnold		19 Jul 1994	Deputy Commanding General, U.S. Army Forces Command/Commanding General, Third U.S. Army/Commanding General, U.S. Army Forces Central Command (DCG FORSCOM/CG TUSA/CG USARCENT), 1994–1997.	3	1962 (USMA)	32	(1940– )
51	Paul E. Blackwell Sr.		1 Aug 1994	Deputy Chief of Staff, Operations and Plans, Army Staff/Senior Army Representative, U.N. Military Staff Committee (DCSOPS/Sr. Army Rep), 1994–1995.; Deputy Chief of Staff, Operations and Plans, Army Staff (DCSOPS), 1995–1996.	2	1965 (ROTC) (Note: Received commission, June 1963; reported for active duty, June 1965.)	29	(1941– )
52	Caryl G. Marsh		1 Aug 1994	Commanding General, I Corps, 1994–1996.	2	1962 (ROTC)	32	(1939–2013)
*	David A. Bramlett		23 Sep 1994	Deputy Commander in Chief/Chief of Staff, U.S. Pacific Command (DCINCPAC), 1994–1996.; Commander in Chief, U.S. Pacific Command (CINCPAC), 1995–1996.	2	1964 (USMA)	30	(1941– ) Promoted to general, 1 Sep 1996.
53	Theodore G. Stroup Jr.		26 Sep 1994	Deputy Chief of Staff, Personnel, Army Staff (DCSPER), 1994–1996.	2	1962 (USMA)	32	(1940– )
54	Jay M. Garner		26 Sep 1994	Commanding General, U.S. Army Space and Strategic Defense Command (CG USASSDC), 1994–1996.; Assistant Vice Chief of Staff, U.S. Army (AVCSA), 1996–1997.	3	1962 (ROTC)	32	(1938– ) Director, Office for Reconstruction and Humanitarian Assistance, Iraq, 2003.
55	Thomas M. Montgomery		7 Oct 1994	U.S. Military Representative, NATO Military Committee (USMILREP), 1994–1997.	3	1963 (ROTC)	31	(1941– )
56	Richard F. Timmons		19 Oct 1994	Commanding General, Eighth U.S. Army/Chief of Staff, United Nations Command, ROK/U.S. Combined Forces Command and U.S. Forces Korea (CG EUSA/COFS UNC/CFC/USFK), 1994–1997.	3	1965 (VMI)	29	(1942– )
57	Edward D. Baca		1 Nov 1994	Chief, National Guard Bureau (CNGB), 1994–1998.	4	1962 (OCS)	32	(1938–2020) First Hispanic to be chief of the National Guard Bureau.
58	Otto J. Guenther		1 Jan 1995	Director, Information Systems for Command, Control, Communications and Computers (DISC4), 1995–1997.	2	1963 (ROTC)	32	(1941–2021)
59	Paul E. Menoher Jr.		10 Feb 1995	Deputy Chief of Staff, Intelligence, Army Staff (DCSINT), 1995–1997.	2	1961 (ROTC)	34	(1939–2020)
*	John N. Abrams		6 Apr 1995	Commanding General, V Corps, 1995–1997.; Deputy Commanding General, U.S. Army Training and Doctrine Command (DCG TRADOC), 1997–1998.	3	1967 (OCS)	28	(1946–2018) Promoted to general, 14 Sep 1998. Son of Army four-star general Creighton Abrams; brother of Army four-star general Robert B. Abrams.
60	Guy A. J. LaBoa		12 May 1995	Commanding General, Second U.S. Army, 1995.; Commanding General, First U.S. Army (CG FUSA), 1995–1997.	2	1962 (ROTC)	33	(1939– )
61	Robert E. Gray		25 May 1995	Deputy Commander in Chief, U.S. Army Europe and Seventh Army (DCINCUSAREUR), 1995–1997.	2	1966 (OCS)	29	(1941–2011)
62	Ronald V. Hite		26 May 1995	Military Deputy to the Assistant Secretary of the Army for Research, Development and Acquisition (MD(ASA(RDA)), 1995–1996.; Military Deputy to the Assistant Secretary of the Army for Research, Development and Acquisition/Director, U.S. Army Acquisition Corps (MD(ASA(RDA)/DIRAAC), 1996–1997.	2	1964 (ROTC)	31	(1943– )
63	George A. Fisher Jr.		9 Jun 1995	Chief of Staff, U.S. Army Forces Command (COFS FORSCOM), 1995–1997.; Commanding General, First U.S. Army (CG FUSA), 1997–1999.	4	1964 (USMA)	31	(1942– )
64	William G. Carter III		15 Jun 1995	Chief of Staff, Allied Forces Southern Europe (COFS AFSOUTH), 1995–1997.	2	1965 (OCS)	30	(c. 1946– )
65	Leonard D. Holder Jr.		19 Jul 1995	Commanding General, U.S. Army Combined Arms Center/Commandant, U.S. Army Command and General Staff College/Deputy Commanding General, Combined Arms, U.S. Army Training and Doctrine Command (CG USACAC/CMDT CGSC/DCG-CA TRADOC), 1995–1997.	2	1966 (Texas A&M)	29	(1944– )
66	John A. Dubia		8 Aug 1995	Director, Army Staff (DAS), 1995–1999.	4	1966 (USMA)	29	(1943– )
67	Jared L. Bates		8 Aug 1995	Inspector General, U.S. Army (IG), 1995–1997.	2	1964 (ROTC)	31	(1941– ) Coordinator of Operations, Office for Reconstruction and Humanitarian Assistance, 2003.
68	Hubert G. Smith		1 Sep 1995	Deputy Commander in Chief/Chief of Staff, U.S. Transportation Command (DCINCTRANS), 1995–1997.	2	1962 (ROTC)	33	(1941– )
*	Thomas A. Schwartz		6 Dec 1995	Commanding General, III Corps, 1995–1998.	3	1967 (USMA)	28	(1945– ) Promoted to general, 31 Aug 1998.
69	Patrick M. Hughes		12 Feb 1996	Director, Intelligence, Joint Staff, J2, 1994–1996.; Director, Defense Intelligence Agency (DIRDIA), 1996–1999.	3	1968 (ROTC)	28	(1942–2024) U.S. Assistant Secretary of Homeland Security for Information Analysis, 2003–2005.
*	John M. Keane		23 Feb 1996	Commanding General, XVIII Airborne Corps, 1996–1998.; Deputy Commander in Chief/Chief of Staff, U.S. Atlantic Command (DCINCACOM), 1998–1999.	3	1966 (ROTC)	30	(1943– ) Promoted to general, 22 Jan 1999. Awarded Presidential Medal of Freedom, 2020.
70	John J. Cusick		22 Apr 1996	Director, Logistics, Joint Staff, J4, 1996–1998.	2	1964 (ROTC)	32	(1942– )
71	Dennis L. Benchoff		1 Jul 1996	Deputy Commanding General, U.S. Army Materiel Command (DCG AMC), 1996–1998.	2	1962 (USMA)	34	(1939– )
72	William M. Steele		11 Jul 1996	Commanding General, U.S. Army Pacific (CG USARPAC), 1996–1998.; Commanding General, U.S. Army Combined Arms Center/Commandant, U.S. Army Command and General Staff College/Deputy Commanding General, Combined Arms, U.S. Army Training and Doctrine Command (CG USACAC/CMDT CGSC/DCG-CA TRADOC), 1998–2001.	5	1967 (Citadel)	29	(1945– )
73	Joseph E. DeFrancisco		15 Jul 1996	Deputy Commander in Chief/Chief of Staff, U.S. Pacific Command (DCINCPAC), 1996–1998.	2	1965 (USMA)	31	(1942– )
74	Joseph W. Kinzer		17 Jul 1996	Commanding General, Fifth U.S. Army, 1996–1998.	2	1964 (OCS)	32	(1939– )
*	Eric K. Shinseki		5 Aug 1996	Deputy Chief of Staff, Operations and Plans, Army Staff (DCSOPS), 1996–1997.	1	1965 (USMA)	31	(1942– ) Promoted to general, 5 Aug 1997. U.S. Secretary of Veterans Affairs, 2009–2014.
75	David L. Benton III		9 Aug 1996	Chief of Staff, U.S. European Command (COFS USEUCOM), 1996–1998.	2	1961 (USMA)	35	(c. 1942– )
*	Peter J. Schoomaker		22 Aug 1996	Commanding General, U.S. Army Special Operations Command (CG USASOC), 1996–1997.	1	1969 (ROTC)	27	(1946– ) (Note: Retired as general, November 2000; recalled as general, August 2003.) Promoted to general, 4 Oct 1997. Brother of Army lieutenant general Eric Schoomaker.
76	Joe N. Ballard		20 Sep 1996	U.S. Army Chief of Engineers/Commanding General, U.S. Army Corps of Engineers (CoE/CG USACE), 1996–2000.	4	1965 (ROTC)	31	(1942– ) First African-American to serve as Chief of Engineers.
77	Edward G. Anderson III		1 Oct 1996	Commanding General, U.S. Army Space and Strategic Defense Command (CG USASSDC), 1996–1997.; Commanding General, U.S. Army Space and Missile Defense Command/U.S. Army Space Command (CG USASMDC/ARSPACE), 1997–1998.; Director, Strategic Plans and Policy, Joint Staff, J5/Senior Member, U.S. Delegation to the U.N. Military Staff Committee (Sr. Member MSC), 1998–1999.; Director, Strategic Plans and Policy, Joint Staff, J5/Chairman, U.N. Military Staff Committee/Senior Member, U.S. Delegation to the U.N. Military Staff Committee (CMSC/Sr. Member MSC), 1999.; Director, Strategic Plans and Policy, Joint Staff, J5/Senior Member, U.S. Delegation to the U.N. Military Staff Committee (Sr. Member MSC), 1999–2000.; Deputy Commander in Chief/Chief of Staff, U.S. Space Command/Vice Commander, U.S. Element, North American Aerospace Defense Command (DCINCSPACE/VCDRNORAD), 2000–2002.; Deputy Commander in Chief, U.S. Northern Command/Vice Commander, U.S. Element, North American Aerospace Defense Command (DCINCNORTH/VCDRNORAD), 2002.; Deputy Commander, U.S. Northern Command/Vice Commander, U.S. Element, North American Aerospace Defense Command (DCDRUSNORTHCOM/VCDRNORAD), 2002–2003.	7	1966 (USMA)	30	(c. 1947– )
78	Ronald R. Blanck		1 Oct 1996	Surgeon General, U.S. Army/Commanding General, U.S. Army Medical Command (TSG/CG MEDCOM), 1996–2000.	4	1968 (direct)	28	(1941– ) President, University of North Texas Health Science Center, 2002–2006.
79	Douglas D. Buchholz		14 Oct 1996	Director, Command, Control, Communications and Computers, Joint Staff, J6, 1996–1998.	2	1968 (ROTC)	28	(1946–2003)
80	Frederick E. Vollrath		1 Nov 1996	Deputy Chief of Staff, Personnel, Army Staff (DCSPER), 1996–1998.	2	1962 (ROTC)	34	(1940–2017) U.S. Assistant Secretary of Defense for Readiness and Force Management, 2012–2014.
81	George A. Crocker		1 Dec 1996	Commanding General, I Corps, 1996–1999.	3	1966 (USMA)	30	(1943– )
*	Tommy R. Franks		30 May 1997	Deputy Commanding General, U.S. Army Forces Command/Commanding General, Third U.S. Army/Commanding General, U.S. Army Forces Central Command (DCG FORSCOM/CG TUSA/CG USARCENT), 1997–2000.	3	1967 (OCS)	30	(1945– ) Promoted to general, 6 Jul 2000. Awarded Presidential Medal of Freedom, 2004.
82	Claudia J. Kennedy		30 May 1997	Deputy Chief of Staff, Intelligence, Army Staff (DCSINT), 1997–2000.	3	1969 (direct)	28	(1947– ) Chair, Defense Department Advisory Committee on Women in the Services, 2010–2011. First woman to achieve the rank of lieutenant general in the Army.
*	Montgomery C. Meigs		1 Jun 1997	Commanding General, U.S. Army Combined Arms Center/Commandant, U.S. Army Command and General Staff College/Deputy Commanding General, Combined Arms, U.S. Army Training and Doctrine Command (CG USACAC/CMDT CGSC/DCG-CA TRADOC), 1997–1998.	1	1967 (USMA)	30	(1945–2021) Promoted to general, 10 Nov 1998. Director, Joint Improvised Explosive Device Defeat Organization, 2005–2007. Distant cousin of Navy four-star admiral Montgomery M. Taylor and great-great-great grandnephew of Montgomery C. Meigs.
83	David J. Kelley		27 Jun 1997	Director, Defense Information Systems Agency (DIRDISA), 1997–1998.; Director, Defense Information Systems Agency/Commander, Joint Task Force-Computer Network Defense (DIRDISA/CDRJTF-CND), 1998–2000.	3	1966 (USMA)	31	(1943–2021)
84	Henry T. Glisson		27 Jun 1997	Director, Defense Logistics Agency (DIRDLA), 1997–2001.	3	1966 (ROTC)	31	(1944– )
*	Paul J. Kern		1 Jul 1997	Military Deputy to the Assistant Secretary of the Army for Research, Development and Acquisition/Director, U.S. Army Acquisition Corps (MD(ASA(RDA)/DIRAAC), 1997–2001.	4	1967 (USMA)	30	(1945– ) Promoted to general, 30 Oct 2001.
85	David K. Heebner		1 Jul 1997	Assistant Vice Chief of Staff, U.S. Army (AVCSA), 1997–1999.	2	1967 (ROTC)	30	(1945– )
86	Richard A. Chilcoat		25 Jul 1997	President, National Defense University (P-NDU), 1997–2000.	3	1964 (USMA)	33	(1938–2010) Commandant, U.S. Army War College, 1994–1997; Dean, Bush School of Government and Public Service, 2002–2010.
*	John W. Hendrix		31 Jul 1997	Commanding General, V Corps, 1997–1999.	2	1965 (ROTC)	32	(1942– ) Promoted to general, 23 Nov 1999.
87	William H. Campbell		1 Aug 1997	Army Chief Information Officer/G-6/Military Deputy to the Army Acquisition Executive/Director, Information Systems for Command, Control, Communications and Computers (CIO/G-6/MILDEP-AAC/DISC4), 1997–2000.	3	1962 (ROTC)	35	(1940– )
88	Robert S. Coffey		1 Aug 1997	Deputy Commander in Chief, U.S. Army Europe and Seventh Army (DCINCUSAREUR), 1997–1998.; Deputy Commanding General/Chief of Staff, U.S. Army Europe and Seventh Army (DCG/COFS USAREUR), 1998–1999.	2	1966 (ROTC)	31	(c. 1947– )
89	Randolph W. House		1 Aug 1997	Commanding General, Eighth U.S. Army/Chief of Staff, United Nations Command, ROK/U.S. Combined Forces Command and U.S. Forces Korea (CG EUSA/COFS UNC/CFC/USFK), 1997–1998.; Deputy Commander in Chief/Chief of Staff, U.S. Pacific Command (DCINCPAC), 1998–2000.	3	1968 (Texas A&M)	29	(c. 1949– )
90	Michael S. Davison Jr.		22 Aug 1997	Director, Defense Security Assistance Agency (DIRDSAA), 1997–1998.; Director, Defense Security Cooperation Agency (DIRDSCA), 1998–2000.	3	1964 (USMA)	33	(c. 1947– ) Son of Army four-star general Michael S. Davison; great-aunt married Navy four-star admiral Arthur W. Radford.
91	Roger G. Thompson Jr.		30 Aug 1997	Deputy Commander in Chief/Chief of Staff, U.S. Transportation Command (DCINCTRANS), 1997–1999.	2	1966 (USMA)	31	(1942– )
92	John M. Pickler		1 Oct 1997	Chief of Staff, U.S. Army Forces Command (COFS FORSCOM), 1997–1999.; Director, Army Staff (DAS), 1999–2001.	4	1965 (USMA)	32	(1943– )
93	William J. Bolt		1 Oct 1997	Deputy Commanding General, Initial Entry Training, U.S. Army Training and Doctrine Command (DCG-IET TRADOC), 1997–1999.	2	1962 (ROTC)	35	(1940– )
94	Thomas N. Burnette Jr.		1 Nov 1997	Deputy Chief of Staff, Operations and Plans, Army Staff (DCSOPS), 1997–1999.; Deputy Commander in Chief, U.S. Joint Forces Command (DCINCJFCOM), 1999–2000.	3	1968 (USMA)	29	(1944–2019)
95	Larry R. Jordan		1 Nov 1997	Inspector General, U.S. Army (IG), 1997–1999.	2	1968 (USMA)	29	(1946– )
96	Jack P. Nix Jr.		5 Nov 1997	Chief of Staff, Allied Forces Southern Europe (COFS AFSOUTH), 1997–2000.	3	1969 (ROTC)	28	(1947– )
97	John M. McDuffie		2 Mar 1998	Director, Logistics, Joint Staff, J4, 1998–2001.	3	1970 (OCS)	28	(c. 1945– )
98	William P. Tangney		3 Mar 1998	Commanding General, U.S. Army Special Operations Command (CG USASOC), 1997–2000.; Deputy Commander in Chief, U.S. Special Operations Command (DCINCSOC), 2000–2002.	4	1967 (Citadel)	31	(1945– )
*	William F. Kernan		12 Mar 1998	Commanding General, XVIII Airborne Corps, 1998–2000.	2	1968 (OCS)	30	(1946– ) Promoted to general, Jul 2000.
99	James M. Link		30 Jul 1998	Deputy Commanding General, U.S. Army Materiel Command (DCG AMC), 1998–2000.	2	1967 (OCS)	31	(1942–2023)
100	Robert F. Foley		30 Jul 1998	Commanding General, Fifth U.S. Army, 1998–2000.	2	1963 (USMA)	35	(1941– ) President, Marion Military Institute, 2000–2004. Awarded Medal of Honor, 1968.
*	Leon J. LaPorte		7 Aug 1998	Commanding General, III Corps, 1998–2001.; Deputy Commanding General/Chief of Staff, U.S. Army Forces Command (DCG/COFS FORSCOM), 2001–2002.	4	1968 (ROTC)	30	(1946– ) Promoted to general, 1 May 2002.
101	David S. Weisman		25 Sep 1998	U.S. Military Representative, NATO Military Committee (USMILREP), 1998–2001.	3	1967 (OCS)	31	(1946– )
102	Daniel J. Petrosky		25 Sep 1998	Commanding General, Eighth U.S. Army/Chief of Staff, United Nations Command, ROK/U.S. Combined Forces Command and U.S. Forces Korea (CG EUSA/COFS UNC/CFC/USFK), 1998–2000.; Chief of Staff, U.S. European Command (COFS USEUCOM), 2000–2002.	4	1967 (OCS)	31	(1944– )
103	David H. Ohle		27 Sep 1998	Deputy Chief of Staff, Personnel, Army Staff (DCSPER), 1998–2000.	2	1968 (USMA)	30	(1944– )
104	John P. Costello		1 Oct 1998	Commanding General, U.S. Army Space and Missile Defense Command/U.S. Army Space Command (CG USASMDC/ARSPACE), 1998–2001.	3	1969 (Citadel)	29	(1947–2010)
105	Edwin P. Smith		1 Oct 1998	Commanding General, U.S. Army Pacific (CG USARPAC), 1998–2002.	4	1967 (USMA)	31	(1945– ) Director, Asia-Pacific Center for Security Studies, 2005–2011.
106	Ronald E. Adams		10 Oct 1998	Deputy Commander/Chief of Staff, Allied Land Forces Central Europe (DCOMLANDCENT), 1998–1999.; Commander, Stabilisation Force in Bosnia and Herzegovina (COMSFOR), 1999–2000.; Deputy Commanding General, Joint Headquarters Center/Commanding General, U.S. Army NATO (DCG JFHQCENT/CG USANATO), 2000–2002.	4	1965 (ROTC)	33	(1943– )
107	James C. King		10 Oct 1998	Director, National Imagery and Mapping Agency (DIRNIMA), 1998–2001.	3	1968 (ROTC)	30	(1946– )
108	Michael L. Dodson		10 Oct 1998	Deputy Commander in Chief, U.S. Central Command (DCINCCENT), 1998–2000.; Commander, Stabilisation Force in Bosnia and Herzegovina (COMSFOR), 2000–2001.; Deputy Commanding General/Chief of Staff, U.S. Army Europe and Seventh Army (DCG/COFS USAREUR), 2001–2003.	5	1968 (OCS)	30	(1945– ) Member of the Kansas House of Representatives from the 67th District, 2021–2025.
109	Randall L. Rigby Jr.		10 Oct 1998	Deputy Commanding General, U.S. Army Training and Doctrine Command (DCG TRADOC), 1998–2000.	2	1968 (ROTC)	30	(1945– )
110	Michael A. Canavan		1 Nov 1998	Chief of Staff, U.S. European Command (COFS USEUCOM), 1998–2001.	3	1967 (OCS)	31	Associate Administrator for Aviation Safety, 2000–2001. Husband of former diplomat Katherine Canavan.
111	Michael W. Ackerman		30 Jul 1999	Inspector General, U.S. Army (IG), 1999–2002.	3	1966 (OCS)	33	(c. 1944– )
112	Lawson W. Magruder III		30 Jul 1999	Deputy Commanding General/Chief of Staff, U.S. Army Forces Command (DCG/COFS FORSCOM), 1999–2001.	2	1969 (ROTC)	30	(1947– )
113	Donald L. Kerrick		1 Aug 1999	Assistant to the Chairman of the Joint Chiefs of Staff (ACJCS), 1999–2000.; Deputy National Security Advisor, 2000–2001. (Note: Kerrick served in this position alongside James Steinberg (Jul–Aug 2000) and Stephen Hadley (2000–2001). As a senior staffer of the White House Office, he concurrently held the title Assistant to the President.)	2	1971 (ROTC)	28	(1948– )
114	John M. Riggs		1 Aug 1999	Commanding General, First U.S. Army (CG FUSA), 1999–2001.; Director, Objective Force Task Force, 2001–2005.	6	1969 (OCS)	30	(1946– ) (Note: Retired as major general, 2005.)
*	Larry R. Ellis		5 Aug 1999	Deputy Chief of Staff, Operations and Plans, Army Staff (DCSOPS), 1999–2001.	2	1969 (ROTC)	30	(1946– ) Promoted to general, 19 Nov 2001.
115	Billy K. Solomon		15 Sep 1999	Commanding General, U.S. Army Combined Arms Support Command (CG CASCOM), 1999–2002.	3	1966 (ROTC)	33	(1944– )
*	James T. Hill		30 Sep 1999	Commanding General, I Corps, 1999–2002.	3	1968 (ROTC)	31	(1946– ) Promoted to general, 18 Aug 2002.
116	Daniel G. Brown		3 Oct 1999	Deputy Commander in Chief/Chief of Staff, U.S. Transportation Command (DCINCTRANS), 1999–2002.	3	1968 (ROTC)	31	(c. 1949– )
*	Kevin P. Byrnes		1 Nov 1999	Assistant Vice Chief of Staff, U.S. Army (AVCSA), 1999–2000.; Deputy Chief of Staff, Programs, Army Staff (DCSPROG), 2000–2001.; Director, Army Staff (DAS), 2001–2002.	3	1969 (OCS)	30	(1950– ) (Note: Relieved, August 2005, and retired as lieutenant general.) Promoted to general, 7 Nov 2002.
117	John A. Van Alstyne		2 Nov 1999	Deputy Commanding General, Initial Entry Training, U.S. Army Training and Doctrine Command (DCG-IET TRADOC), 1999–2001.; Deputy Assistant Secretary of Defense for Military Personnel Policy, 2001–2002.	3	1966 (Texas A&M)	33	(1946– ) Commandant of the Corps of Cadets, Texas A&M University, 2002–2010.
118	James C. Riley		16 Nov 1999	Commanding General, V Corps, 1999–2001.; Commanding General, U.S. Army Combined Arms Center/Commandant, U.S. Army Command and General Staff College/Deputy Commanding General, Combined Arms, U.S. Army Training and Doctrine Command (CG USACAC/CMDT CGSC/DCG-CA TRADOC), 2001–2003.	4	1966 (OCS)	33	(c. 1948– )

== Background ==
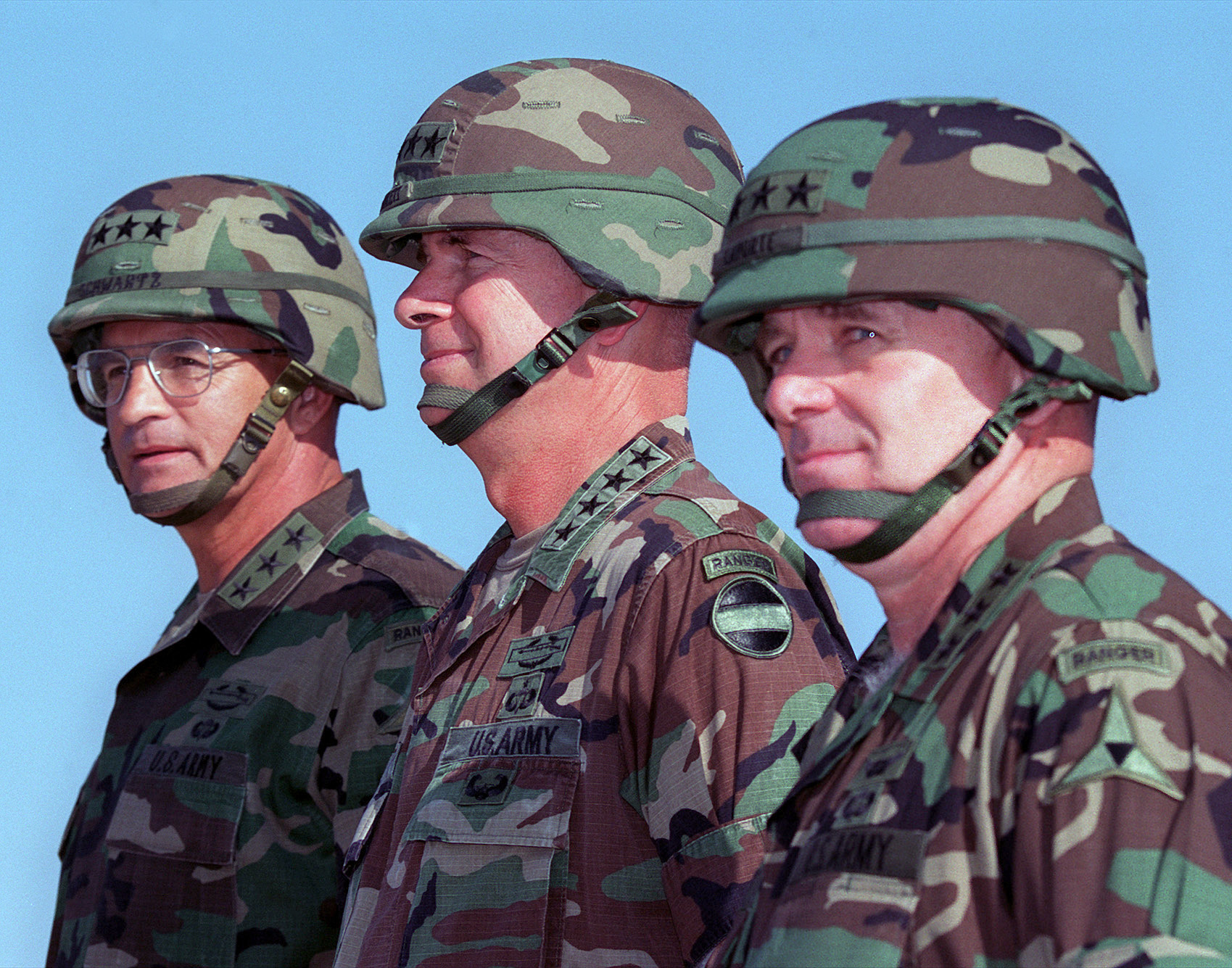
(From left to right) Lt. Gen. Thomas A. Schwartz, Gen. David A. Bramlett and Lt. Gen. Leon J. LaPorte at the III Corps change of command ceremony on August 7, 1998.

=== Position changes, elevations and reductions ===
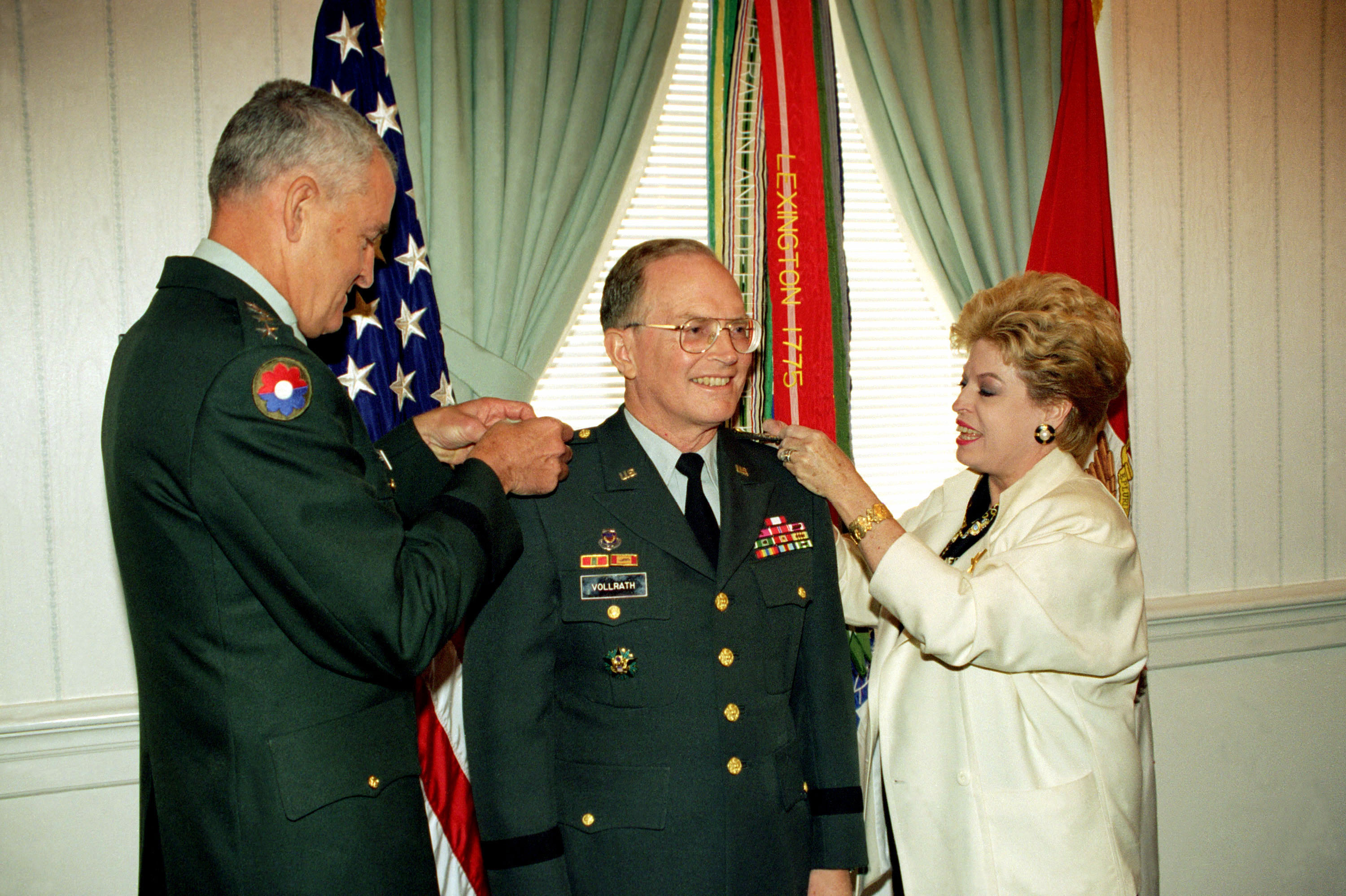
Maj. Gen. Frederick E. Vollrath is pinned with his lieutenant general's stars by his wife Joy and chief of staff of the Army, Gen. Dennis J. Reimer, on September 30, 1996.

Several new joint duty positions were created or elevated to three-star grade in response to American involvement in regional conflicts, namely the Gulf War and the Bosnian War.

- The commanding general of the 22nd Theater Army Area Command, a major general's billet in command of the primary logistics and combat support component of American forces in the Gulf War, was elevated to a lieutenant general's billet to achieve parity with equivalently-ranked commanders in the region. Major General William G. Pagonis was consequently promoted to lieutenant general in February 1991.
- The commander of the NATO Stabilisation Force, a position initially held by the commanding general of U.S. Army Europe, became a separate position in October 1999, with Lieutenant General Ronald E. Adams assuming command from General Montgomery C. Meigs. The arrangement remained in place until 2003.
- Additionally, the deputy commander in chief of Forces Command, later deputy commanding general of U.S. Army Forces Command was dual-hatted as the commanding general of Third Army until 2000; the roles were split thereafter while Third Army transitioned into full service component command status as U.S. Army Central.

One joint duty position was downgraded from four-star to three-star grade between 1990 and 2000.

- The United States military representative to the NATO Military Committee, a four-star position since 1953 became a three-star position in October 1993 to establish equilibrium with the director of strategic plans and policy of the Joint Staff, dual-hatted as the senior military representative of the American delegation to the United Nations Military Staff Committee. Major General Daniel W. Christman was subsequently promoted to lieutenant general and assumed the position from Admiral William D. Smith.

Two three-star positions on the Army Staff underwent changes between 1990 and 2000.

- The deputy chief of staff for operations was divested of responsibilities as the senior Army representative to the NATO Military Committee in 1995, with Lieutenant General Paul E. Blackwell being the last officeholder to hold said position.
- An assistant vice chief of staff of the Army existed from 1996 to 2000 to perform program management and budgeting functions not statutorily exercised by the assistant secretary of the Army for financial management and comptroller.

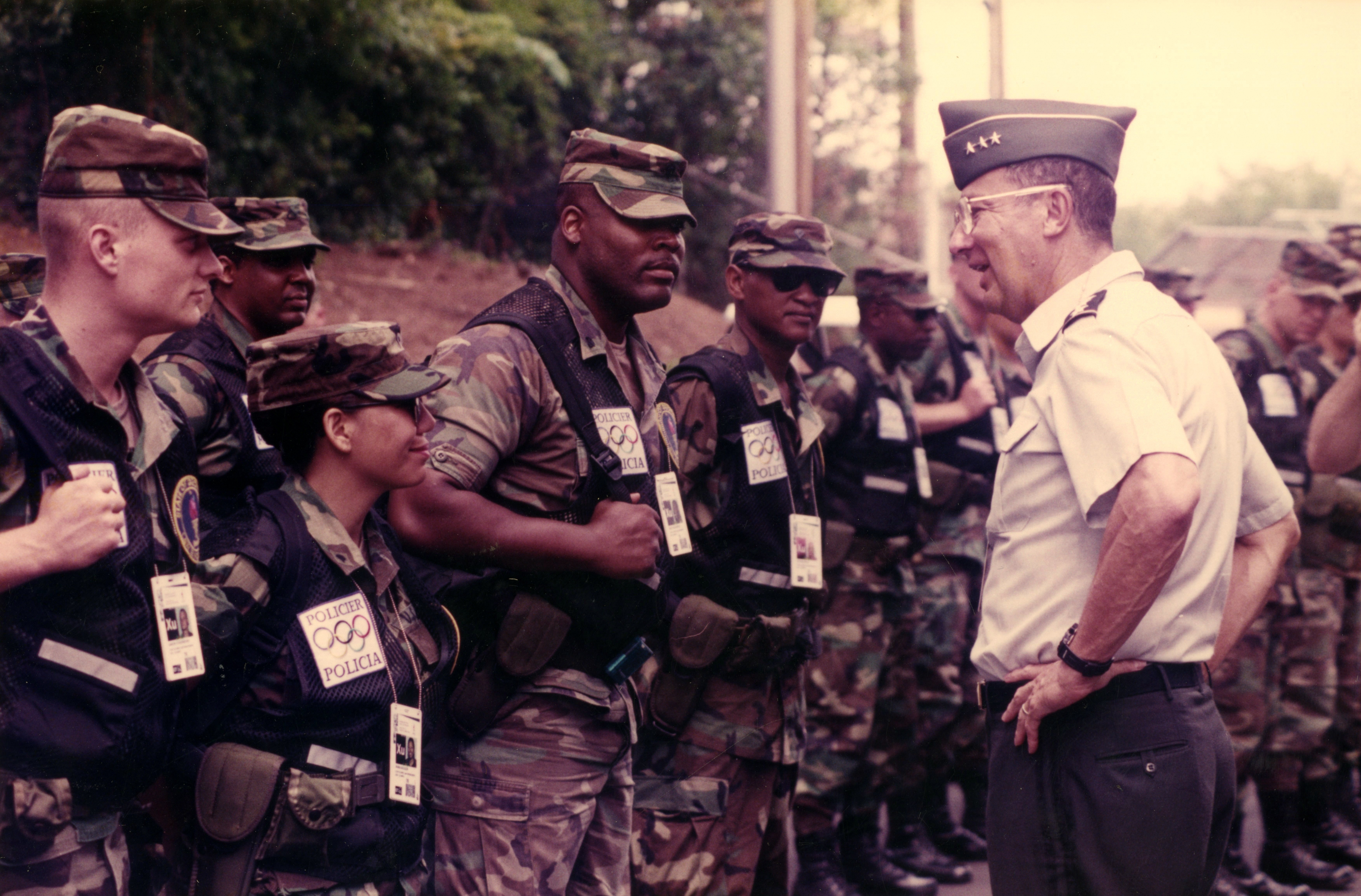
Lt. Gen. Edward D. Baca, chief of the National Guard Bureau, speaks with National Guardsmen in Georgia before the start of their duty day, July 20, 1996.

Two Army commands, one Army service component command, two field armies and one corps with accompanying three-star positions were merged or inactivated between 1990 and 2000, primarily due to post-Cold War force reductions.

- U.S. Army Strategic Defense Command (USSDC) merged with U.S. Army Space Command to become U.S. Army Space and Strategic Defense Command (USASSDC) in 1992 under General Order 12, with Lieutenant General Donald M. Lionetti assuming command. This arrangement lasted until 1997, when the two commands were again separated into U.S. Army Space and Missile Defense Command (USASMDC) and U.S. Army Space Command (ARSPACE) under Lieutenant General Edward G. Anderson III.

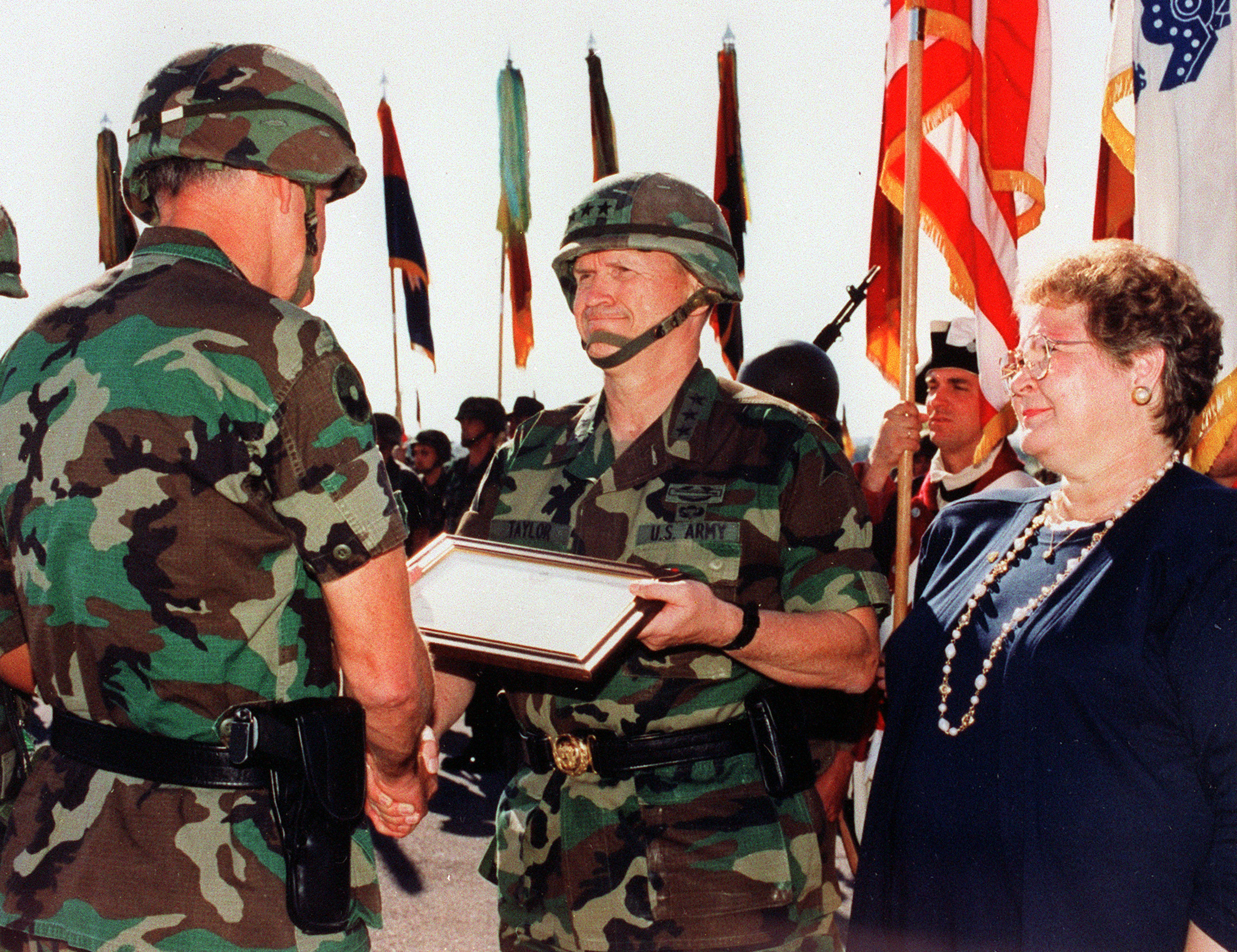
Gen. Dennis J. Reimer, commanding general, U.S. Army Forces Command, presents the Distinguished Service Medal to Lt. Gen. Horace G. Taylor at his retirement ceremony on October 26, 1993.

- U.S. Army Information Systems Command (USAISC) was downgraded to a two-star command in 1992, being renamed U.S. Army Signal Command (USASC). USASC was subordinated to U.S. Army Forces Command in 1996 due to concerns of overcentralization of authority over communications of theater commands. Lieutenant General Peter A. Kind was the last lieutenant general to command USAISC.
- U.S. Army Japan (USARJ), which had stabilized as a three-star billet in 1972, was downgraded to a two-star command in 1994 with its commanding general, Lieutenant General Jerome H. Granrud (dual-hatted as commander of IX Corps) transferring command to Major General Waldo D. Freeman on September 8, 1994.
- Sixth Army and Second Army were disestablished in June and July 1995 respectively, and the commanding generals of both field armies faced reassignment. Lieutenant General Guy A. J. LaBoa of Second Army was reassigned as the commanding general of the First United States Army, whereas Lieutenant General Glynn C. Mallory Jr. of Sixth Army retired instead.
- Additionally, U.S. Army Training and Doctrine Command introduced a new three-star position, the deputy commanding general for initial entry training, responsible for overseeing initial recruit training and development. The position would exist until 2011, when its responsibilities were transferred to the commanding general of U.S. Army Center for Initial Military Training. (Note: The final deputy commanding general for initial military training was dual-hatted as commanding general of the U.S. Army Center for Initial Military Training from 2009 to 2011.)

=== Senate confirmations ===
Military nominations are considered by the Senate Armed Services Committee. While it is rare for three-star or four-star nominations to face even token opposition in the Senate, nominations that do face opposition due to controversy surrounding the nominee in question are typically withdrawn. Nominations that are not withdrawn are allowed to expire without action at the end of the legislative session.

- Major General Raphael J. Hallada was withdrawn from consideration to become commanding general of Fifth Army in 1991, relating to a decision he made not to prosecute the two soldiers responsible for an artillery accident at his command of Fort Sill.

== Legislative history ==
The following list of Congressional legislation includes all acts of Congress pertaining to appointments to the grade of lieutenant general in the United States Army from 1990 to 1999. (Note: Legislative history compiled from the U.S. Congress official website and U.S. Government Publishing Office official website.)

Each entry lists an act of Congress, its citation in the United States Statutes at Large, and a summary of the act's relevance, with officers affected by the act bracketed where applicable. Positions listed without reference to rank are assumed to be eligible for officers of three-star grade or higher.

List of legislation on appointments of lieutenant generals from 1990 to 1999
Legislation	Citation	Summary
Act of December 5, 1991 [National Defense Authorization Act for Fiscal Years 1992 and 1993]	105 Stat. 1304; 105 Stat. 1359	Reduced period between day of relief from final assignment and day before retirement in which an officer may hold temporary three-star or four-star grade from 90 days to 60 days.; Prevented officers whose retired grade is lower than their highest active duty grade from being directly appointed to grade above major general or rear admiral if recalled to active duty.; Authorized officers with a retired grade below lieutenant general or vice admiral to be retired at said grade if recalled to active duty, provided that they, with certification from their service secretary, served in said grade satisfactorily for at least six months during the recall period.
Act of October 5, 1994 [National Defense Authorization Act for Fiscal Year 1995]	108 Stat. 2824; 108 Stat. 2825	Assigned statutory rank of lieutenant general to the chief of the National Guard Bureau (Edward D. Baca). (Note: Until passage of this Act, the chief of the National Guard Bureau held the rank of lieutenant general without statutory requirement from 1974, with Lieutenant General La Vern E. Weber being the first three-star CNGB.)
Act of February 10, 1996 [National Defense Authorization Act for Fiscal Year 1996]	110 Stat. 292; 110 Stat. 293	Removed eligibility of officers above grade of major general or rear admiral to apply for voluntary retirement on the same time-in-grade requirements as officers below said grade.; Specified that an officer who serves or has served in three-star or four-star grade may only be retired at such grade, subject to other time-in-grade requirements, after the secretary of defense certifies in writing to the President and Congress that they served on active duty satisfactorily at such grade.; Specified that officers who served or have served in three-star or four-star grade and subject to certification may not receive any reduction or waiver of time-in-grade requirements if under investigation for alleged misconduct or face disciplinary action for misconduct.

== See also ==
- Lieutenant general (United States)
- General officers in the United States
- List of active duty United States four-star officers
- List of active duty United States three-star officers
- List of United States Army four-star generals
- List of lieutenant generals in the United States Army before 1960
- List of United States Army lieutenant generals from 2000 to 2009
- List of United States Army lieutenant generals from 2010 to 2019
- List of United States Army lieutenant generals since 2020
- List of United States military leaders by rank
- Staff (military)

== Bibliography ==
- United States Department of the Army (1976) [1948], United States Army Register, Washington D.C.: U.S. Government Printing Office
- Department of the Army Pamphlet 360-10: Army Executive Biographies, Washington, D.C.: United States Department of the Army, 15 May 1985
- Dupont, Daniel; West, Togo (20 November 1995), "Assistant vice chief slot would be powerful position: Leadership Considering New Senior Officer for Requirements, Resources", Inside the Army, 7 (46), Washington, D.C.: Inside Washington Publishers: 1–9, JSTOR 43978681
- Defense Technical Information Center (26 June 1990), Department of Defense General/Flag Officer Worldwide Roster (June 1990) (PDF), Washington, D.C.: Washington Headquarters Services, archived (PDF) from the original on 4 December 2021
- Defense Technical Information Center (4 November 1990), Department of Defense General/Flag Officer Worldwide Roster (September 1990) (PDF), Washington, D.C.: Washington Headquarters Services, archived (PDF) from the original on 4 December 2021
- Defense Technical Information Center (22 January 1991), Department of Defense General/Flag Officer Worldwide Roster (December 1990) (PDF), Washington, D.C.: Washington Headquarters Services, archived (PDF) from the original on 4 December 2021
- Defense Technical Information Center (6 May 1991), Department of Defense General/Flag Officer Worldwide Roster (March 1991) (PDF), Washington, D.C.: Washington Headquarters Services, archived (PDF) from the original on 4 December 2021
- Defense Technical Information Center (8 July 1991), Department of Defense General/Flag Officer Worldwide Roster (June 1991) (PDF), Washington, D.C.: Washington Headquarters Services, archived (PDF) from the original on 4 December 2021
- Defense Technical Information Center (5 December 1991), Department of Defense General/Flag Officer Worldwide Roster (September 1991) (PDF), Washington, D.C.: Washington Headquarters Services, archived (PDF) from the original on 4 December 2021
- Defense Technical Information Center (12 February 1992), Department of Defense General/Flag Officer Worldwide Roster (December 1991) (PDF), Washington, D.C.: Washington Headquarters Services, archived (PDF) from the original on 4 December 2021
- Defense Technical Information Center (21 May 1992), Department of Defense General/Flag Officer Worldwide Roster (March 1992) (PDF), Washington, D.C.: Washington Headquarters Services, archived (PDF) from the original on 27 October 2021
- Defense Technical Information Center (11 August 1992), Department of Defense General/Flag Officer Worldwide Roster (June 1992) (PDF), Washington, D.C.: Washington Headquarters Services, archived (PDF) from the original on 4 December 2021
- Defense Technical Information Center (9 November 1992), Department of Defense General/Flag Officer Worldwide Roster (September 1992) (PDF), Washington, D.C.: Washington Headquarters Services, archived (PDF) from the original on 4 December 2021
- Defense Technical Information Center (16 March 1993), Department of Defense General/Flag Officer Worldwide Roster (December 1992) (PDF), Washington, D.C.: Washington Headquarters Services, archived (PDF) from the original on 4 December 2021
- Defense Technical Information Center (21 April 1993), Department of Defense General/Flag Officer Worldwide Roster (March 1993) (PDF), Washington, D.C.: Washington Headquarters Services, archived (PDF) from the original on 22 October 2021
- Defense Technical Information Center (3 December 1993), Department of Defense General/Flag Officer Worldwide Roster (September 1993) (PDF), Washington, D.C.: Washington Headquarters Services, archived (PDF) from the original on 4 December 2021
- Defense Technical Information Center (10 March 1994), Department of Defense General/Flag Officer Worldwide Roster (December 1993) (PDF), Washington, D.C.: Washington Headquarters Services, archived (PDF) from the original on 10 May 2021
- Defense Technical Information Center (9 August 1994), Department of Defense General/Flag Officer Worldwide Roster (June 1994) (PDF), Washington, D.C.: Washington Headquarters Services, archived (PDF) from the original on 4 December 2021
- Defense Technical Information Center (22 November 1994), Department of Defense General/Flag Officer Worldwide Roster (September 1994) (PDF), Washington, D.C.: Washington Headquarters Services, archived (PDF) from the original on 22 October 2021
- Defense Technical Information Center (6 February 1995), Department of Defense General/Flag Officer Worldwide Roster (December 1994) (PDF), Washington, D.C.: Washington Headquarters Services, archived (PDF) from the original on 22 October 2021
- Defense Technical Information Center (10 May 1995), Department of Defense General/Flag Officer Worldwide Roster (March 1995) (PDF), Washington, D.C.: Washington Headquarters Services, archived (PDF) from the original on 4 December 2021
- Defense Technical Information Center (21 August 1995), Department of Defense General/Flag Officer Worldwide Roster (June 1995) (PDF), Washington, D.C.: Washington Headquarters Services, archived (PDF) from the original on 4 December 2021
- Defense Technical Information Center (26 October 1995), Department of Defense General/Flag Officer Worldwide Roster (September 1995) (PDF), Washington, D.C.: Washington Headquarters Services, archived (PDF) from the original on 4 December 2021
- Defense Technical Information Center (15 February 1996), Department of Defense General/Flag Officer Worldwide Roster (December 1995) (PDF), Washington, D.C.: Washington Headquarters Services, archived (PDF) from the original on 4 December 2021
- Defense Technical Information Center (19 April 1996), Department of Defense General/Flag Officer Worldwide Roster (March 1996) (PDF), Washington, D.C.: Washington Headquarters Services, archived (PDF) from the original on 4 December 2021
- Defense Technical Information Center (26 July 1996), Department of Defense General/Flag Officer Worldwide Roster (June 1996) (PDF), Washington, D.C.: Washington Headquarters Services, archived (PDF) from the original on 4 December 2021
- Defense Technical Information Center (29 October 1996), Department of Defense General/Flag Officer Worldwide Roster (September 1996) (PDF), Washington, D.C.: Washington Headquarters Services, archived (PDF) from the original on 4 December 2021
- Defense Technical Information Center (31 January 1997), Department of Defense General/Flag Officer Worldwide Roster (December 1996) (PDF), Washington, D.C.: Washington Headquarters Services, archived (PDF) from the original on 4 December 2021
- Defense Technical Information Center (1 May 1997), Department of Defense General/Flag Officer Worldwide Roster (March 1997) (PDF), Washington, D.C.: Washington Headquarters Services, archived (PDF) from the original on 22 October 2021
- Defense Technical Information Center (24 July 1997), Department of Defense General/Flag Officer Worldwide Roster (June 1997) (PDF), Washington, D.C.: Washington Headquarters Services, archived (PDF) from the original on 4 December 2021
- Defense Technical Information Center (17 October 1997), Department of Defense General/Flag Officer Worldwide Roster (September 1997) (PDF), Washington, D.C.: Washington Headquarters Services, archived (PDF) from the original on 4 December 2021
- Defense Technical Information Center (18 February 1998), Department of Defense General/Flag Officer Worldwide Roster (December 1997) (PDF), Washington, D.C.: Washington Headquarters Services, archived (PDF) from the original on 22 October 2021
- Defense Technical Information Center (14 May 1998), Department of Defense General/Flag Officer Worldwide Roster (March 1998) (PDF), Washington, D.C.: Washington Headquarters Services, archived (PDF) from the original on 4 December 2021
- Defense Technical Information Center (13 August 1998), Department of Defense General/Flag Officer Worldwide Roster (June 1998) (PDF), Washington, D.C.: Washington Headquarters Services, archived (PDF) from the original on 24 June 2021
