= Theobald Otjen =

American politician

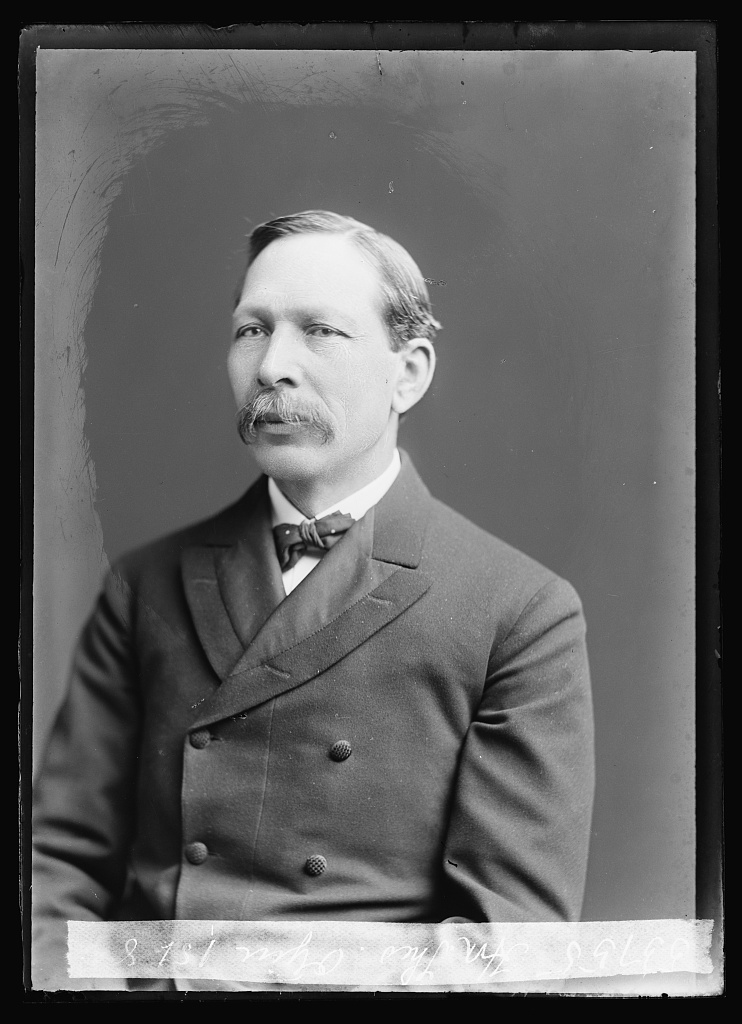

Member of the U.S. House of Representatives from Wisconsin's 4th district
- In office March 4, 1895 – March 3, 1907
- Preceded by: Peter J. Somers
- Succeeded by: William J. Cary

Personal details
- Born: October 27, 1851 China Township, Michigan, U.S.
- Died: April 11, 1924 (aged 72) Milwaukee, Wisconsin, U.S.
- Resting place: Forest Home Cemetery, Milwaukee
- Party: Republican
- Spouse: Louisa Elizabeth Heames (m. 1879–1924)
- Children: 5
- Relatives: John P. Otjen (great-grandson)
- Education: University of Michigan Law School

Theobald Otjen (October 27, 1851 – April 11, 1924) was an American lawyer and Republican politician from Milwaukee, Wisconsin. He served six terms in the U.S. House of Representatives, representing the southern half of Milwaukee County from 1895 to 1907. Before his election to Congress, he served seven years on the Milwaukee Common Council. Through his political activities on the city council and in congress, he was instrumental in the establishment of the Great Lakes Naval Training Station and the Milwaukee public parks.

In the Republican Party's internal feuding of the early 20th century, Otjen sought to remain neutral, but was ultimately defeated in the 1906 primary, squeezed between progressive and stalwart Republican opponents.

He is the paternal great-grandfather of U.S. Army general John P. Otjen.

== Biography ==
Theobald Otjen was born to German American immigrants in west China Township in St. Clair County, Michigan. His mother died when he was four years old, and at age six he was sent to live on his uncle's farm. At age 13, he moved to live with his married elder sister, Mrs. Margaret Wenning, in Marine City, Michigan, where he attended the Marine City Academy. At the academy, he came to the attention of the headmistress, Emily Ward, whose brother E. B. Ward was a wealthy pioneer in the lumber and iron industry of the new midwestern states. She took him on as a private tutor, and sponsored him to attend a private school in Detroit.

At age 18, Otjen made his first visit to Milwaukee County, Wisconsin, visiting Bay View, Milwaukee, to labor in a rolling mill owned by Ward. The following year, he was hired as foreman of the mill, and remained there for two years. In 1872, he returned to Michigan to resume his studies in Detroit, then went on to study law at the University of Michigan at Ann Arbor. He completed his education on March 25, 1875, and was admitted to the Michigan bar.

He practiced law in Detroit for seven years before returning to Milwaukee and settling there permanently. He resumed the practice of law in Milwaukee and coupled it with a lucrative real estate business in partnership with his brother, Christian. Their firm, known as Otjen & Otjen, thrived and was eventually passed on to their children.

Otjen became politically active with the Republican Party of Wisconsin. He was first elected to public office in 1887, when he was elected to a seat on the Milwaukee Common Council; he ultimately served on the council until 1894. As a member of the city council, Otjen served on the legislative committee and was active in lobbying the state government for laws relevant to Milwaukee's interests. His most notable work may have been his lobbying for an 1889 bill which established Milwaukee's public park system; Governor William D. Hoard later recalled that it was Otjen's insistence that dissuaded him from vetoing the legislation. His efforts were also notable in securing state funding to establish the Milwaukee Public Library and public museum building; he subsequently served as the city council's representative on the boards of the library and museum.

In 1892, Otjen sought election as city comptroller, but lost the general election. That fall he made his first bid for election to the U.S. House of Representatives, challenging Democratic incumbent John L. Mitchell, but lost. When Mitchell resigned his seat to accept election to the U.S. Senate in 1893, Otjen ran in the special election to succeed him in Congress, but lost again.

Otjen was eventually elected as a Republican to the 54th and to the five succeeding Congresses (March 4, 1895 – March 3, 1907) as the representative of Wisconsin's 4th congressional district. While in Congress, Otjen was instrumental to the establishment of the Great Lakes Naval Training Station.

The Republican Party of this era was embroiled in internal factional warfare between progressive and stalwart camps, and the contest was particularly intense in Wisconsin. Otjen sought to remain neutral and balance the interests of the two factions, but his neutrality ultimately reached a breaking point in 1906. Otjen had been solicited by both factions to support their candidate for a postmaster position in Milwaukee; Otjen ultimately chose to endorse neither candidate. In the 1906 primary, Otjen faced stalwart opponent Charles B. Perry and progressive opponent William J. Cary; Cary went on to win the nomination.

Otjen left office in March 1907 and resumed the practice of law in Milwaukee. He ran for mayor in 1914, opposing a major sewer project. He was not elected, but claimed credit for a significant modification to the sewerage plan.

== Personal life and family ==
Theobald Otjen was one of seven children born to John Conrad Otjen and his wife Dorothea (née Schreiner); Theobald was a first generation American, his parents were German American immigrants from the Bremen area.

Theobald Otjen married Louisa Elizabeth Heames, daughter of prominent Detroit civil engineer Henry Heames, in Detroit, on March 27, 1879. They had at least five children between 1880 and 1892.

Theobald Otjen died in Milwaukee on April 11, 1924. He was interred at Milwaukee's historic Forest Home Cemetery.

U.S. House of Representatives
Preceded by Peter J. Somers	Member of the U.S. House of Representatives from Wisconsin's 4th congressional district March 4, 1895 – March 3, 1907	Succeeded by William J. Cary
