= Paul E. Blackwell =

United States Army general

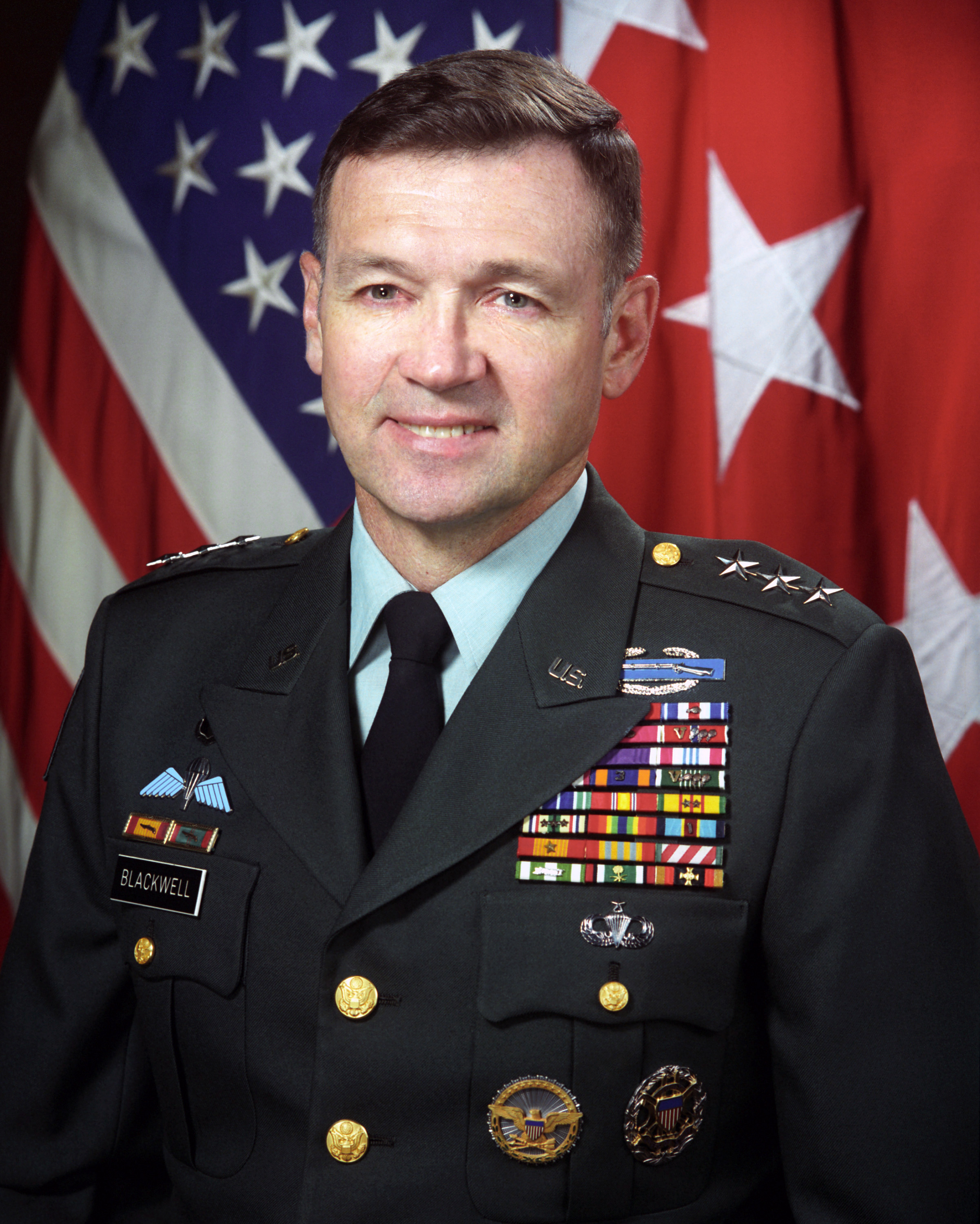
- Nickname: Gene
- Born: August 19, 1941 (age 84); York, South Carolina, U.S.
- Allegiance: United States of America
- Branch: United States Army
- Service years: 1965–1996
- Rank: Lieutenant General
- Commands: Deputy Chief of Staff for Operations and Plans, United States Army; Deputy Director of Operations, National Military Command Center; 24th Infantry Division; 2d Armored Division (Forward); 1st Brigade, 9th Infantry Division; 1st Battalion, 4th Infantry Regiment
- Conflicts: Vietnam War; Persian Gulf War
- Awards: Silver Star (2); Bronze Star (9); Purple Heart; Air Medal (3)

Paul Eugene Blackwell Sr. (born August 19, 1941) is a retired United States Army lieutenant general. During his 31-year career in the United States Army, LTG Blackwell held a wide variety of command and staff positions including assignment as Deputy Chief of Staff for Operations and Plans (G3), Department of the Army and commanding general, 24th Infantry Division (Mechanized), at Fort Stewart, Georgia. Other key assignments include deputy director of Operations, National Military Command Center, Washington, DC; commanding general, 2d Armored Division (Forward), Garlstedt, Federal Republic of Germany, and Assistant Division Commander, 3d Armored Division, Federal Republic of Germany.

Blackwell earned a B.S. degree with honors in Agricultural Education from Clemson University in June 1963. He was commissioned as a reserve infantry officer through the Army ROTC program, but did not report for active duty until after he had completed an M.S. degree in Horticulture and Agricultural Education at Clemson in June 1965. Blackwell graduated from the Marine Corps Command and Staff College in June 1976 and the United States Army War College in June 1983.

== Awards and decorations ==
U.S. service medals
	Combat Infantryman Badge
	Senior Parachutist Badge
	Army Staff Identification Badge
	Office of the Joint Chiefs of Staff Identification Badge
	Army Distinguished Service Medal with Oak leaf cluster
	Silver Star with Oak leaf cluster
	Legion of Merit with Oak leaf cluster
	Bronze Star with V device and eight Oak leaf clusters
	Purple Heart
	Defense Meritorious Service Medal
	Air Medal with device 3
	Army Commendation Medal with V device and three Oak leaf clusters
	National Defense Service Medal
	Vietnam Service Medal with two campaign stars
	Army Overseas Service Ribbon
Foreign decorations
	Kuwait Liberation Medal (Saudi Arabia)
	Kuwait Liberation Medal (Kuwait)
	Republic of Vietnam Campaign Medal
British parachutist badge	Parachutist Badge (United Kingdom)
