= Guy A. J. LaBoa =

United States Army general

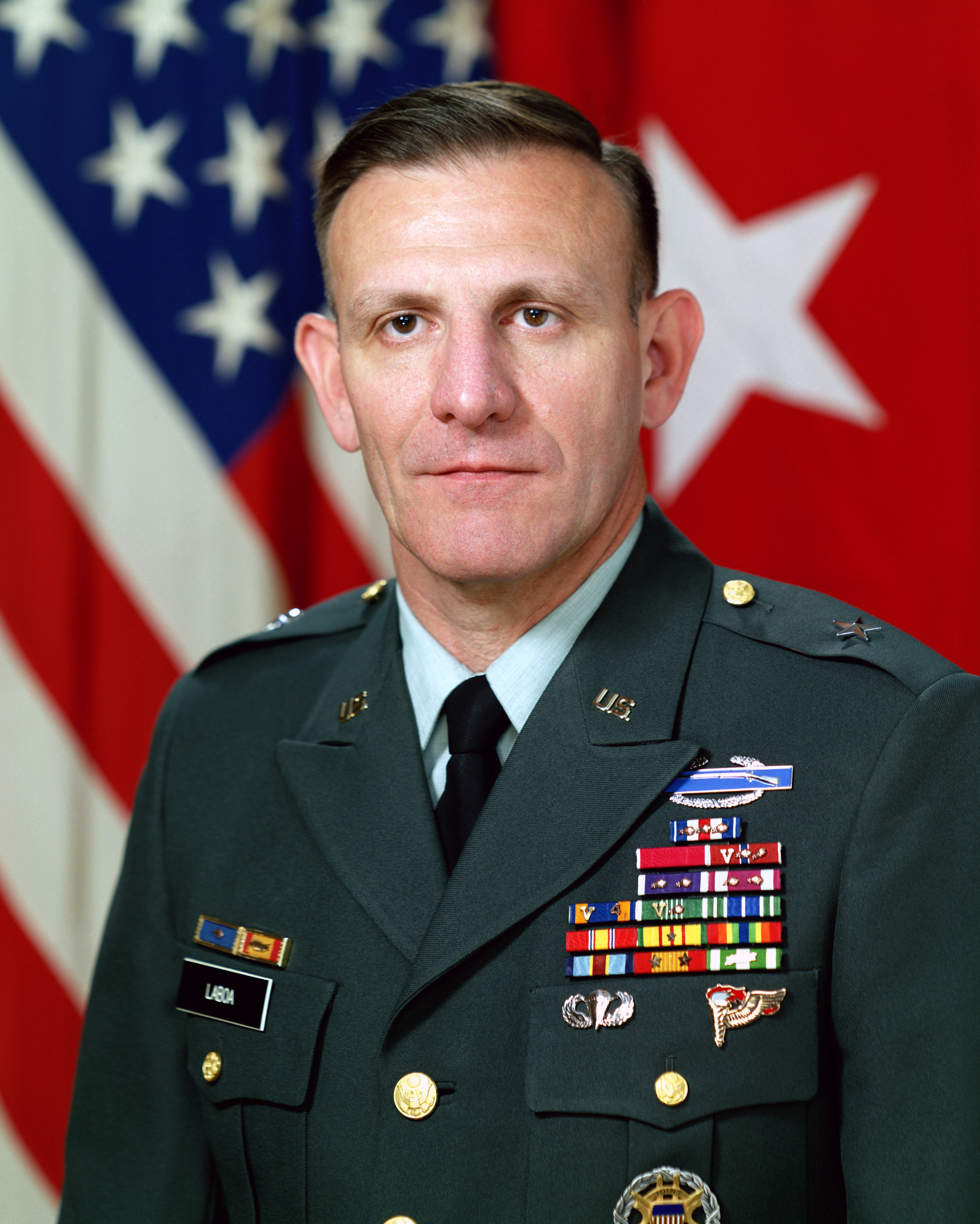
- LaBoa, probably as assistant division commander of the 4th Infantry Division, circa 1987
- Born: 1939 (age 86–87); Houston, Texas, U.S.
- Military career
- Allegiance: United States
- Branch: United States Army
- Service years: 1962–1997
- Rank: Lieutenant General
- Commands: First United States Army; Second United States Army; 4th Infantry Division; 1st Brigade, 8th Infantry Division; 2nd Battalion, 15th Infantry Regiment
- Conflicts: Vietnam War
- Awards: Army Distinguished Service Medal; Silver Star (4); Legion of Merit; Bronze Star Medal (3); Purple Heart (3)

Guy A. J. LaBoa (born 1939) is a retired United States Army officer. A veteran of the Vietnam War, his senior command assignments included the 4th Infantry Division and the First United States Army.

== Early life ==
Guy Anthony Jackson Laboa was born in Houston, Texas, on December 9, 1939. He graduated from Channelview High School, and in 1962 he received a Bachelor of Science in commercial marketing from Northwestern State University in Natchitoches, Louisiana. A participant in the Reserve Officers' Training Corps program, at his graduation he received his commission in the United States Army as a second lieutenant of Infantry.

== Military career ==
=== Start of career ===
LaBoa completed the Infantry Officer Basic Course in 1962. His additional training included the Airborne and Pathfinder courses.

From October 1964 to September 1965, LaBoa served in Vietnam during the Vietnam War. After returning to the United States, he was assigned as supply officer for the 6th Student Battalion at Fort Benning.

In 1966, LaBoa was appointed aide-de-camp to Lieutenant General Louis W. Truman, commander of the Third United States Army at Fort McPherson, Georgia.

During his second deployment to Vietnam, LaBoa served with the 25th Infantry Division as commander of Company A, 1st Battalion, 5th Infantry Regiment and operations officer for 1st Battalion, 5th Infantry. He was selected for promotion to major in 1968.

LaBoa's post-Vietnam assignments included commander of 2nd Battalion, 15th Infantry Regiment from 1977 to 1979. In 1981, LaBoa graduated from the United States Army War College and received a Master of Science in public administration from Shippensburg State University.

In the early and mid 1980s, LaBoa's assignments included assistant chief of staff for plans, operations and training (G-3) and inspector general for the 5th Infantry Division.

=== General officer ===
As a colonel, LaBoa commanded 1st Brigade, 8th Infantry Division. He then served as chief of staff for the 8th Infantry Division, and remained in this position until being selected for promotion to brigadier general in 1985. From March 1986 to June 1987, LaBoa served as deputy director of operations in the operations directorate of the Chairman of the Joint Chiefs of Staff. LaBoa's later assignments as a general officer included assistant division commander (support) for the 4th Infantry Division, and director of operations for Forces Command.

LaBoa served as commander of the 4th Infantry Division from October 1991 to October 1993. He served as chief of staff for Forces Command from 1993 to 1995. From May to July 1995, LaBoa commanded Second United States Army as a lieutenant general. When First United States Army and Second Army were combined, LaBoa assumed command of First Army, which he led until his 1997 retirement.

== Post-military career ==
After leaving the army, LaBoa was employed by CIBA Vision as director of daily contact lens manufacturing. He became a resident of Dahlonega, Georgia, and served on the city council from 2004 to 2008.

In 2008, LaBoa joined KBR, Inc. as principal manager for the company's participation in the LOGCAP III program. He was an unsuccessful candidate for the Republican nomination for chairman of the Lumpkin County Board of Commissioners in 2012.

== Family ==
In 1961, LaBoa married Monya Ann Winn (1941–1964). His second wife was Patricia Ann Berry of East Point, Georgia. LaBoa is the father of three children: Anthony, Tracy, Mary Kaye.

== Awards and decorations ==
Combat Infantryman Badge
Basic Parachutist Badge
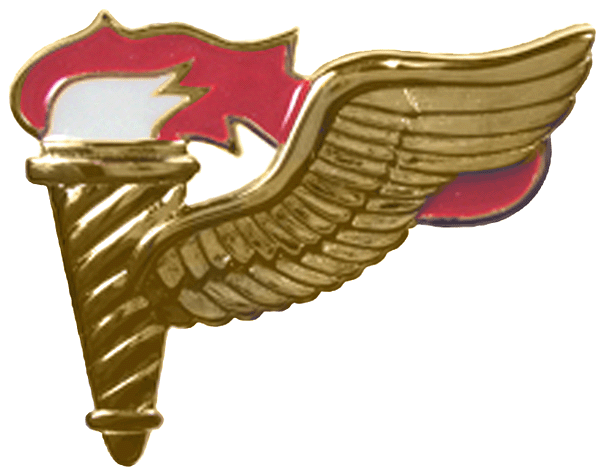
Pathfinder Badge
Joint Chiefs of Staff Identification Badge

Army Distinguished Service Medal
Silver Star with three bronze oak leaf clusters
Legion of Merit
Bronze Star with "V" device and two oak leaf clusters
Purple Heart with two oak leaf clusters
Defense Meritorious Service Medal
Meritorious Service Medal with two oak leaf clusters
Air Medal with "V" device and bronze award numeral 2
Army Commendation Medal with "V" device and oak leaf cluster
Army Achievement Medal
National Defense Service Medal with one bronze service star
Vietnam Service Medal with one service star
Army Service Ribbon
Army Overseas Service Ribbon
Vietnam Gallantry Cross with Gold and Bronze Stars
Vietnam Gallantry Cross Unit Citation
Vietnam Campaign Medal

In 1992, LaBoa was inducted into Northwestern State University's Hall of Fame, the Long Purple Line.

== Sources ==
=== Internet ===
- "Monya Ann Laboa in the Texas Death Certificates, 1903–1982". Ancestry.com. Provo, UT: Ancestry.com, LLC. September 5, 1964.
- McCullough, Gary (December 17, 2008). "Minutes, Dahlonega City Council Work Session". dahlonega-ga.gov/. Dahlonega, GA: Dahlonega City Council. Archived from the original on February 19, 2017.
- Horn, Douglas (KBR, Inc.) (March 29, 2010). "Statement of Douglas Horn Before the Commission on Wartime Contracting in Iraq and Afghanistan" (PDF). cybercemetery.unt.edu/. Denton, TX: University of North Texas.
- Horn, Michael J. (June 17, 2016). "Directory of Former Commanders". 15thinfantry.org. North Babylon NY: 15th Infantry Regiment Association. Archived from the original on April 23, 2018.

=== Press release ===
- Perry, William J. (January 10, 1995). "General Officer Announcement: Guy A. J. Laboa" (Press release). Washington, DC: U.S. Department of Defense.

=== News ===
- "NSC Seniors Wed In Home Rites Friday Evening". Shreveport Times. Shreveport, LA. September 13, 1961 – via Newspapers.com.
- Holliman, Maureen (March 24, 1966). "Lt. LaBoa Wins Bronze Star for Service in Vietnam War". Baytown Sun. Baytown, TX – via NewspaperARCHIVE.com.
- Holliman, Maureen (June 30, 1966). "Appointed Aide". Baytown Sun. Baytown, TX – via NewspaperARCHIVE.com.
- "Army Lists 4,513 Selected for Major". European Stars and Stripes. Darmstadt, West Germany. October 29, 1968 – via NewspaperARCHIVE.com.
- "Decorated: Silver Star". Tropic Lightning News. Cu Chi, Vietnam. February 3, 1969.
- Anderson, Jan (June 16, 1969). "2d Bde Troops End It All for 59 NVA". Tropic Lightning News. Cu Chi, Vietnam.
- McMillin, Sue (September 13, 1991). "New Leader Will take the Helm at Fort Carson". Colorado Springs Gazette Telegraph. Colorado Springs, CO – via NewspaperARCHIVE.com.
- "Information Box: Maj. Gen. Guy A. J. LaBoa". Colorado Springs Gazette Telegraph. Colorado Springs, CO. January 13, 1992 – via NewspaperARCHIVE.com.
- Stanford, Ken (March 3, 2004). "McCullough elected Dahlonega mayor". WDUN (AM). Gainesville, GA.
- Bates, Diane (August 1, 2012). "Politics in Lumpkin County". Dahlonega and Beyond. Dahlonega, GA.

=== Books ===
- Institute of Medicine: Committee on Strategies to Protect the Health of Deployed U.S. Forces (2000). Protecting Those Who Serve: Strategies to Protect the Health of Deployed U.S. Forces. Washington, DC: National Academy Press. ISBN 978-0-309-07189-5.
- Taylor, Herbie R. (2011). A Boy from Barnhart: Times Remembered. Bloomington, IN: iUniverse. ISBN 978-1-4620-3953-1.
- U.S. Army Adjutant General (1966). U.S. Army Register. Vol. 1. Washington, DC: U.S. Government Printing Office – via Ancestry.com.

=== Magazines ===
- "Northwestern Alumni in the News". Alumni Columns. Natchitoches, LA: Northwestern State University Alumni Association. Spring 1983.
- "Alumni Names and Faces in the News". Alumni Columns. Natchitoches, LA: Northwestern State University Alumni Association. Fall 1985.
- "Distinguished Alumni Honored". Alumni Columns. Natchitoches, LA: Northwestern State University Alumni Association. Winter 1992.

Military offices
Preceded by John P. Otjen	Commanding General of the First United States Army; 1995–1997	Succeeded by George A. Fisher Jr.
Preceded by Robert F. Foley	Commanding General of the Second United States Army; May–July 1995	Unit inactivated
Preceded by Neal T. Jaco	Commanding General of the 4th Infantry Division; 1991–1993	Succeeded by Thomas A. Schwartz
