= Ronald E. Adams =

American Army general (born 1943)

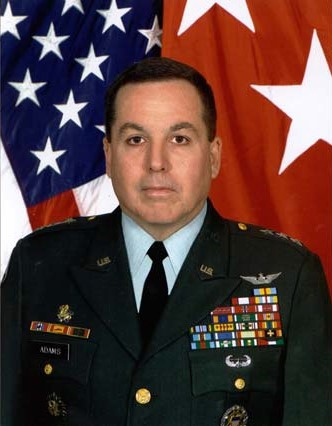
- Born: 28 December 1943 (age 82)
- Military career
- Allegiance: United States
- Branch: United States Army
- Service years: 1965–2002
- Rank: Lieutenant General
- Commands: United States Army NATO; Stabilisation Force in Bosnia and Herzegovina; United States Army Aviation Center; Aviation Brigade, 25th Infantry Division; 2nd Aviation Battalion, 2nd Infantry Division
- Conflicts: Vietnam War; Gulf War
- Awards: Defense Distinguished Service Medal (2); Army Distinguished Service Medal (2); Defense Superior Service Medal; Legion of Merit (5); Bronze Star Medal (3); Meritorious Service Medal (3); Air Medal (5)

Ronald Emerson Adams (born 28 December 1943) is a retired lieutenant general of the United States Army who served as commander of the Stabilisation Force in Bosnia and Herzegovina from October 1999 to September 2000. He previously served as commanding general of the United States Army Aviation Center from July 1994 to September 1996.

== Early life and education ==
Raised in a military family, Adams attended grade school in Lancaster, Pennsylvania and graduated from high school in Alabama. He attended Jacksonville State University, graduating with a B.S. degree in business administration in 1965. Adams was commissioned through the Army ROTC program. He later earned an M.B.A. degree in management from Pennsylvania State University in 1972. Adams is also a graduate of the Army Command and General Staff College in 1975 and the National War College in 1985.

== Military career ==
Adams served two combat tours in Vietnam. After his first tour, he attended the Army Aviation School and completed flight training in 1968. Adams was awarded three Bronze Star Medals and five Air Medals.

Adams commanded the 2nd Aviation Battalion, 2nd Infantry Division from April 1981 to July 1982 in Korea. He served as commanding officer of the Aviation Brigade, 25th Infantry Division from June 1985 to July 1987 at Schofield Barracks.

During the Gulf War, Adams served as assistant commander of the 101st Airborne Division (Air Assault). He served as Director of Army Aviation at the Pentagon from 1992 to 1993.

As a lieutenant general, Adams served as deputy commander and chief of staff, Allied Land Forces Central Europe; commander, Stabilisation Force in Bosnia and Herzegovina; and commanding general, United States Army NATO. He was awarded the Gold Cross of Honour by Germany for his service as the Stabilisation Force commander.

Adams retired from active duty effective 1 January 2002 after more than thirty-six years of military service.

== Personal ==
Adams is the son of Robert Harvey Adams Sr. (20 March 1915 – 10 April 1997) and Margaret May "Peggy" (Freeman) Adams (27 February 1921 – 15 October 2016). His father served in the Pennsylvania Army National Guard before World War II and the regular Army until 1960, retiring as a major. He then joined the Department of State, serving as a foreign service officer until 1975. His mother was a photographer who worked for the Central Intelligence Agency. Adams has a sister and two brothers. His brothers also served as Army aviators, both retiring as lieutenant colonels.

Adams is married to Ardee Adams. The couple settled in Carlisle, Pennsylvania after his retirement.
