= John P. Otjen =

United States Army general (born 1942)

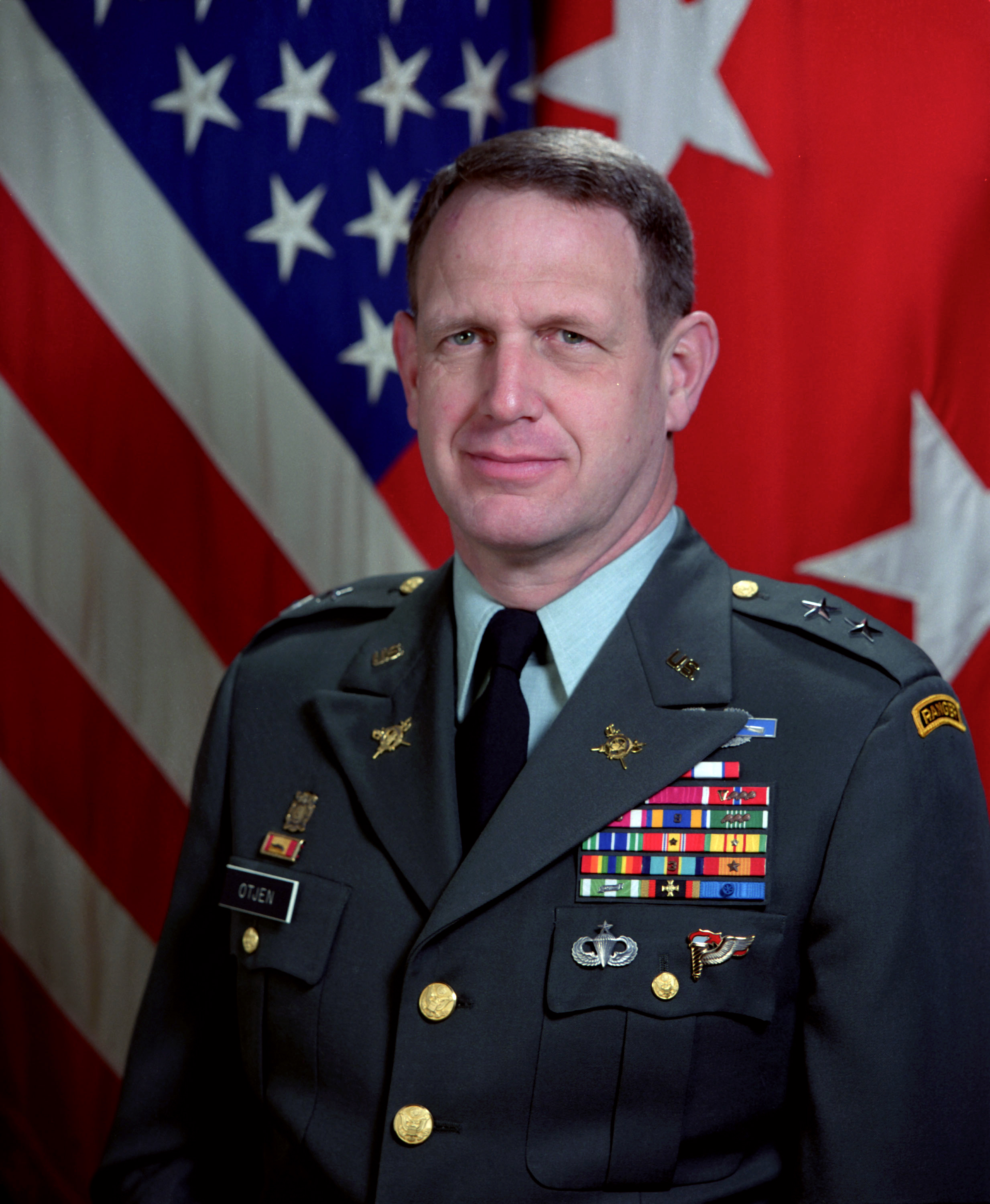
- Otjen as Deputy Inspector General in 1992
- Born: January 17, 1942 (age 84)
- Military career
- Allegiance: United States
- Branch: United States Army
- Service years: 1964–1995
- Rank: Lieutenant General
- Commands: First United States Army; 8th Infantry Division; 2nd Brigade, 8th Infantry Division; 2nd Battalion, 16th Infantry Regiment
- Conflicts: Vietnam War
- Awards: Army Distinguished Service Medal (2); Defense Superior Service Medal; Legion of Merit; Bronze Star Medal (4)

John Putnam Otjen (born January 17, 1942) is a retired United States Army officer. He attained the rank of lieutenant general, and his command assignments included First United States Army and the 8th Infantry Division.

== Early life ==
Otjen grew up in Elm Grove, Wisconsin. In 1960, he graduated from Brookfield Central High School in Brookfield, Wisconsin.

Otjen attended the United States Military Academy. The Corps of Cadets took part in a 1964 birthday celebration for Douglas MacArthur (MacArthur's last). During preparations for the event, organizers realized that Otjen's great-grandfather Theobald Otjen was the Congressman who had appointed MacArthur to West Point in 1899. This resulted in Otjen getting to meet MacArthur for an individual discussion, and both the family connection and the meeting were widely reported in United States newspapers.

== Military career ==
=== Early career ===
After his 1964 graduation from West Point, Otjen completed the Infantry Officer Basic Course and Ranger School. Otjen was also a graduate of Airborne School and the Pathfinder course. In 1965, he was assigned to the 1st Battalion, 506th Infantry, a unit of the 101st Airborne Division.

In 1966, Otjen went to Vietnam as a liaison officer on the staff of the 2nd Battalion, 14th Infantry, a unit of the 25th Infantry Division. His continued Vietnam War service with the 25th Division included platoon leader, executive officer, and commander of 2d Battalion's Company A, and aide-de-camp to the 25th Division commander, John C. F. Tillson. He was promoted to captain in 1967.

Otjen completed the Infantry Officer Advanced Course, and also graduated from the University of Wisconsin in 1971 with a Master of Business Administration. He was promoted to major in 1974, and graduated from the United States Army Command and General Staff College in 1976.

In 1977, Otjen was assigned to the 2d Battalion, 9th Infantry, 3d Brigade, 2d Infantry Division in South Korea. From 1979 to 1981, Otjen commanded 2d Battalion, 16th Infantry, which had recently been re-flagged from 2d Battalion, 9th Infantry.

In 1981 Otjen graduated from the United States Army War College, after which he served as assistant chief of staff for personnel (G-1) on the staff of the 8th Infantry Division. From 1982 to 1985 he commanded the 2d Brigade, 8th Infantry Division.

After completing his brigade command, Otjen served as chief of staff for the 1st Armored Division, and deputy chief of staff for support at Central Army Group in Heidelberg, West Germany.

=== General officer ===
From 1989 to 1990, Otjen was assistant division commander of the 8th Infantry Division. He commanded the division from 1990 to 1992, and began the process of mobilizing the organization to take part in Operation Desert Storm. Some 8th Division units took part in the conflict, but the bulk of the division did not deploy before the conflict ended. Otjen was the 8th Division's last commander before the organization was inactivated in 1992.

From 1992 to 1993, Otjen was the Army's Deputy Inspector General for inspections, training and automation. During his time in this post, Otjen was co-chairman of a working group which provided advice to the Secretary of Defense on the issue of lifting the government's ban on homosexuals being allowed to serve in the military. The group recommended keeping the ban in place; Secretary of Defense Les Aspin considered this recommendation and several other options before issuing the regulations that became known as the "Don't ask, don't tell" policy.

From 1993 to 1995, Otjen was commander of First United States Army, and oversaw the organization's relocation from Fort Meade to Fort Gillem. Otjen retired in 1995.

== Post-military career ==
After his retirement from the military, Otjen was deputy director of the George C. Marshall European Center for Security Studies. He was later an executive with L3, a defense contractor.

== Awards and decorations ==
Combat Infantryman Badge
Ranger tab
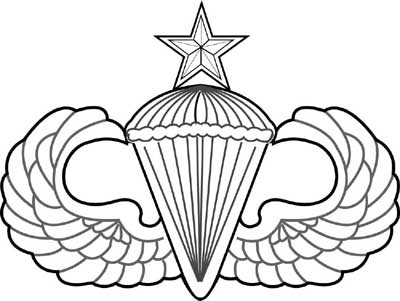
Senior Parachutist Badge
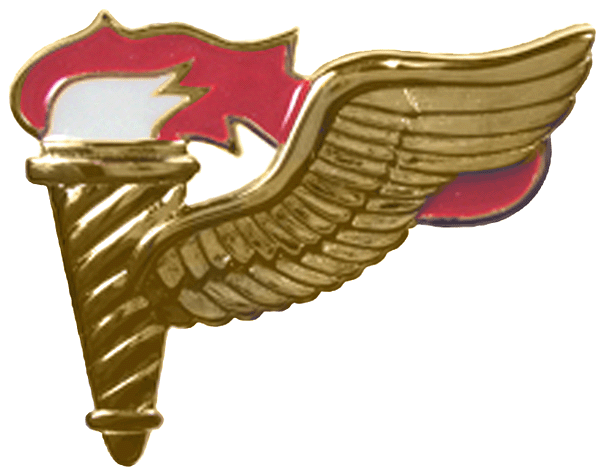
Pathfinder Badge
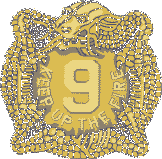
9th Infantry Regiment Distinctive Unit Insignia

Army Distinguished Service Medal with one bronze oak leaf cluster
Defense Superior Service Medal
Legion of Merit
Bronze Star with "V" device and three oak leaf clusters
Meritorious Service Medal with oak leaf cluster
Air Medal with bronze award numeral 2
Army Commendation Medal with three oak leaf clusters
Army Achievement Medal
National Defense Service Medal with one bronze service star
Vietnam Service Medal with silver service star
Army Service Ribbon
Army Overseas Service Ribbon with bronze award numeral 3
Vietnam Gallantry Cross with bronze star
Badge of Honour of the Bundeswehr in gold (Germany)
National Order of Merit (France), Officer
Vietnam Gallantry Cross Unit Citation
Vietnam Campaign Medal

== Family ==
Otjen and his wife Ann M. Otjen are the parents of three children, Thomas, Michael and Sarah.

== Sources ==
=== Newspapers ===
- Leung, Shirley (June 30, 1995). "1st Army Leaves Fort Meade". Baltimore Sun. Baltimore, MD.
- Jones, Bob (Advertiser correspondent) (May 1, 1966). "The Bad Breaks Keep Plaguing Sergeant Bode". Tropic Lightning News. Củ Chi Base Camp, South Vietnam: Public Affairs Office, 25th Infantry Division.
- Lippman, Thomas W. (Washington Post) (August 27, 1993). "Outside Study Challenges Findings Of Internal Pentagon Study on Gays". The Tech. Cambridge, MA: Massachusetts Institute of Technology.
- "West Point Cadets to Bring MacArthur Birthday Salute". Minneapolis Morning Tribune. Minneapolis, MN. Associated Press. January 25, 1964. p. 3.
- "1st Brigade 2/14th". Tropic Lightning News. Củ Chi Base Camp, South Vietnam: Public Affairs Office, 25th Infantry Division. November 4, 1966. p. 7.
- "2nd Bn, 14th Inf". Tropic Lightning News. Củ Chi Base Camp, South Vietnam: Public Affairs Office, 25th Infantry Division. January 20, 1967. p. 9.
- "Receiving Promotions in Vietnam". Waukesha Daily Freeman. Waukesha, WI. April 1, 1967. p. 2 (Saturday Review).
- "Photo caption: Watching children from the village of Tan Thoi frolic on a new piece of playground equipment". Tropic Lightning News. Củ Chi Base Camp, South Vietnam: Public Affairs Office, 25th Infantry Division. May 15, 1967. p. 3.
- "Fort Meade commander retires today". Baltimore Sun. Baltimore, MD. September 28, 1993. Archived from the original on March 14, 2017.
- Hartman, Bob (June 1, 2016). "Know Your Companions: LTG (Ret.) John P. Otjen" (PDF). The Free State Officers Call. Fort Meade, MD: The Military Order of the World Wars: General George G. Meade Chapter. p. 2. Archived from the original (PDF) on March 14, 2017.

=== Internet ===
- Kozaryn, Linda D. (September 11, 1998). "Marshall Center Curriculum, Student Body, Impact Grow". United States Department of Defense. Washington, DC: U.S. Department of Defense. Armed Forces Press Service. Archived from the original on March 14, 2017.
- "Lieutenant General John Putnam Otjen". The Akers Historical Uniform Collection. Oklahoma City, OK: T. S. Akers. April 18, 2014.
- "Awards, John Putnam Otjen". Hall of Valor. Springfield, VA: Military Times.
- "L-3 Communications Holdings, Inc. Shareholder Information Statement". www.sec.gov/. Washington, DC: Securities and Exchange Commission. 2012.

=== Magazines ===
- Otjen, John P. (January 1, 1992). "Pathfinders Close Another Chapter In Their Distinguished History" (PDF). Pathfinder. APO, NY: Public Affairs Office, 8th Infantry Division.

Military offices
Preceded by James H. Johnson Jr.	Commanding General of the First United States Army; 1993–1995	Succeeded by Guy A. J. LaBoa
Preceded by David M. Maddox	Commanding General of the 8th Infantry Division; 1990–1992	Unit inactivated
