= George A. Fisher Jr. =

United States Army general

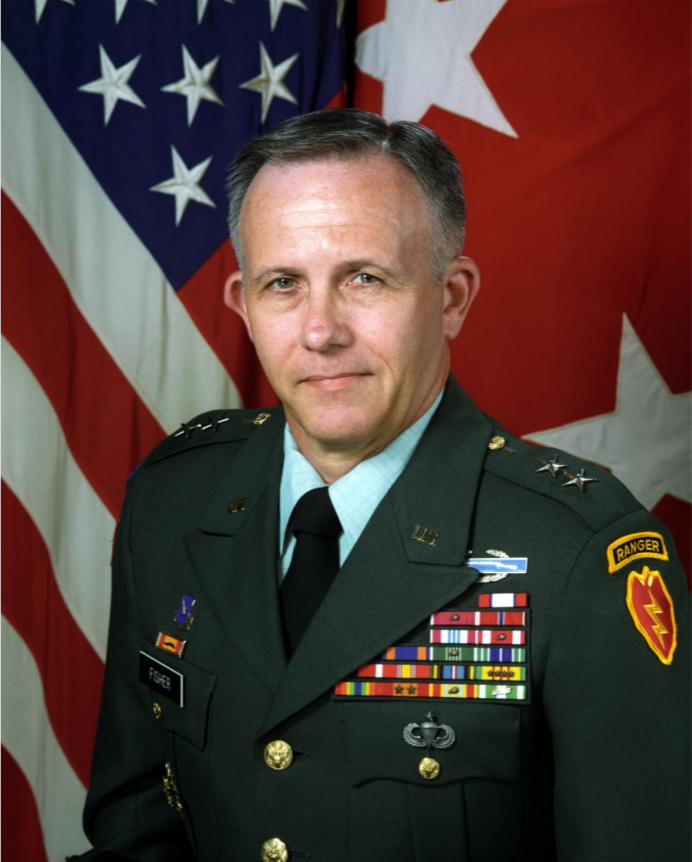
- Fisher as commander of the 25th Infantry Division, circa 1993
- Born: July 1, 1942 (age 84); Arkansas, U.S.
- Military career
- Allegiance: United States
- Branch: United States Army
- Service years: 1964–1999
- Rank: Lieutenant General
- Commands: First United States Army; Multi-National Force – Haiti; 25th Infantry Division; Joint Readiness Training Center; 3rd Battalion, 32nd Infantry Regiment
- Conflicts: Operation Powerpack; Vietnam War; Operation Uphold Democracy
- Awards: Army Distinguished Service Medal; Legion of Merit (2); Bronze Star Medal

George A. Fisher Jr. (born July 1, 1942) is a retired United States Army officer. He attained the rank of lieutenant general during his career, and is a veteran of Operation Powerpack, the United States action in the Dominican Republic and the Vietnam War. Among his senior command assignments were the Joint Readiness Training Center (1991–1993), 25th Infantry Division (1993–1995), Multi-National Force – Haiti (1995), and First United States Army (1997–1999).

== Early life ==
George Alexander Fisher Jr. was born in Arkansas on July 1, 1942, and raised in North Carolina. He graduated from Millbrook High School in Millbrook (now part of Raleigh) in 1960. Fisher attended the United States Military Academy, and graduated in 1964 with a commission as a second lieutenant of Infantry.

== Early career ==
Fisher completed his initial post-commissioning training in 1964 and 1965, and was assigned to the 508th Infantry Regiment, a unit of the 82nd Airborne Division. He served with the 508th during its participation in Operation Powerpack, the United States action in the Dominican Republic during that country's 1965–1966 civil war.

During 1967–1968, Fisher served in the Vietnam War as a member of Military Assistance Command, Vietnam. Fisher attended the Naval Postgraduate School from 1970 to 1972, and earned a master's degree in systems analysis. In 1973, he graduated from the United States Army Command and General Staff College.

== Continued career ==
Fisher served as assistant professor of mathematics at West Point from 1973 to 1975, and was assigned to the Berlin Brigade in West Germany from 1976 to 1979. From 1981 to 1983, he commanded 3rd Battalion, 32nd Infantry, a 7th Infantry Division unit based at Fort Ord.

From 1983 to 1984, Fisher was a student at the Naval War College. After his graduation, he served as assistant chief of staff for plans, operations, and training (G-3) for the 7th Infantry Division. He commanded the 3rd Brigade, 7th Infantry Division from 1986 to 1988. From 1988 to 1990, Fisher served at the Pentagon as chief of technical management for the Army staff.

== General officer ==
Fisher was promoted to brigadier general in 1990, and served as assistant division commander of the 25th Infantry Division from 1990 to 1991. From 1991 to 1993, he commanded the Joint Readiness Training Center. During his command, the JRTC relocated from Little Rock Air Force Base and Fort Chaffee, Arkansas to a permanent location at Fort Polk, Louisiana.

In 1993, Fisher was promoted to major general and commanded the 25th Infantry Division from 1993 to 1995. In 1995, he served as commander of Multi-National Force – Haiti during Operation Uphold Democracy.

From 1995 to 1997, Fisher served as chief of staff for the Army's Forces Command. He was promoted to lieutenant general in 1997, and he served as commander of First United States Army from 1997 until his 1999 retirement.

== Awards ==
Fisher's awards included the Army Distinguished Service Medal, Legion of Merit with oak leaf cluster, Bronze Star Medal, Defense Meritorious Service Medal, Meritorious Service Medal, Air Medal, Army Commendation Medal, and Army Achievement Medal. He was also a recipient of the Combat Infantryman Badge and Senior Parachutist Badge.

== Post-military career ==
From 1999 to 2012, Fisher was employed at the Oak Ridge National Laboratory in Tennessee as director of advanced technologies (eastern region) for Lockheed Martin Energy Systems and director of Department of Defense programs.

== Family ==
In 1972, Fisher married Brenda Sue Perry of North Carolina. They are the parents of a daughter, Tara, whose career has included serving as associate provost for planning, assessment, and evaluation and dean of enrollment management at The Citadel.

== Sources ==
=== Books ===
- Fisher, James Luther (1980). The Jacob Fisher Family. Vol. 2. Charlotte, NC: Delmar Publishers & Printers.
- Millbrook High School (1960). The Laurel: Millbrook High School Yearbook. Millbrook, NC: Millbrook High School.
- United States Military Academy (1989). Register of Graduates and Former Cadets, United States Military Academy. West Point, NY: U.S. Military Academy.

=== Internet ===
- Class of 1964 (2000). "Millennium Roster and Directory". West Point, NY: United States Military Academy.

=== Magazines ===
- Kuipers, Devrin; Krause, Carolyn (January 27, 2011). "Speaker's Biography, Retired Lieutenant General George Fisher". The Oaktarian. Oak Ridge, TN: Rotary Club of Oak Ridge, Tennessee. Archived from the original on January 12, 2018.

=== Newspapers ===
- "Schofield says Goodbye to Assistant Commanders". Honolulu Star-Bulletin. Honolulu, HI. December 13, 1989 – via Newspapers.com.
- "Troops Ready for Ft. Polk". Daily World. Opelousas, LA. October 13, 1991 – via Newspapers.com.
- Leggett, Jim (July 2, 1993). "Magruder Takes Over at Polk". The Town Talk. Alexandria, LA – via Newspapers.com.
- Kakesako, Gregg K. (October 26, 1993). "Isles' Top Soldier Stays Alert". Honolulu Star-Bulletin. Honolulu, HI – via Newspapers.com.

Military offices
Preceded by Guy A. J. LaBoa	Commanding General of the First United States Army; 1997–1999	Succeeded by John M. Riggs
Preceded by Robert L. Ord III	Commanding General of the 25th Infantry Division; 1993–1995	Succeeded by John J. Maher
