= Jerome H. Granrud =

US Army lieutenant general (1937–2020)

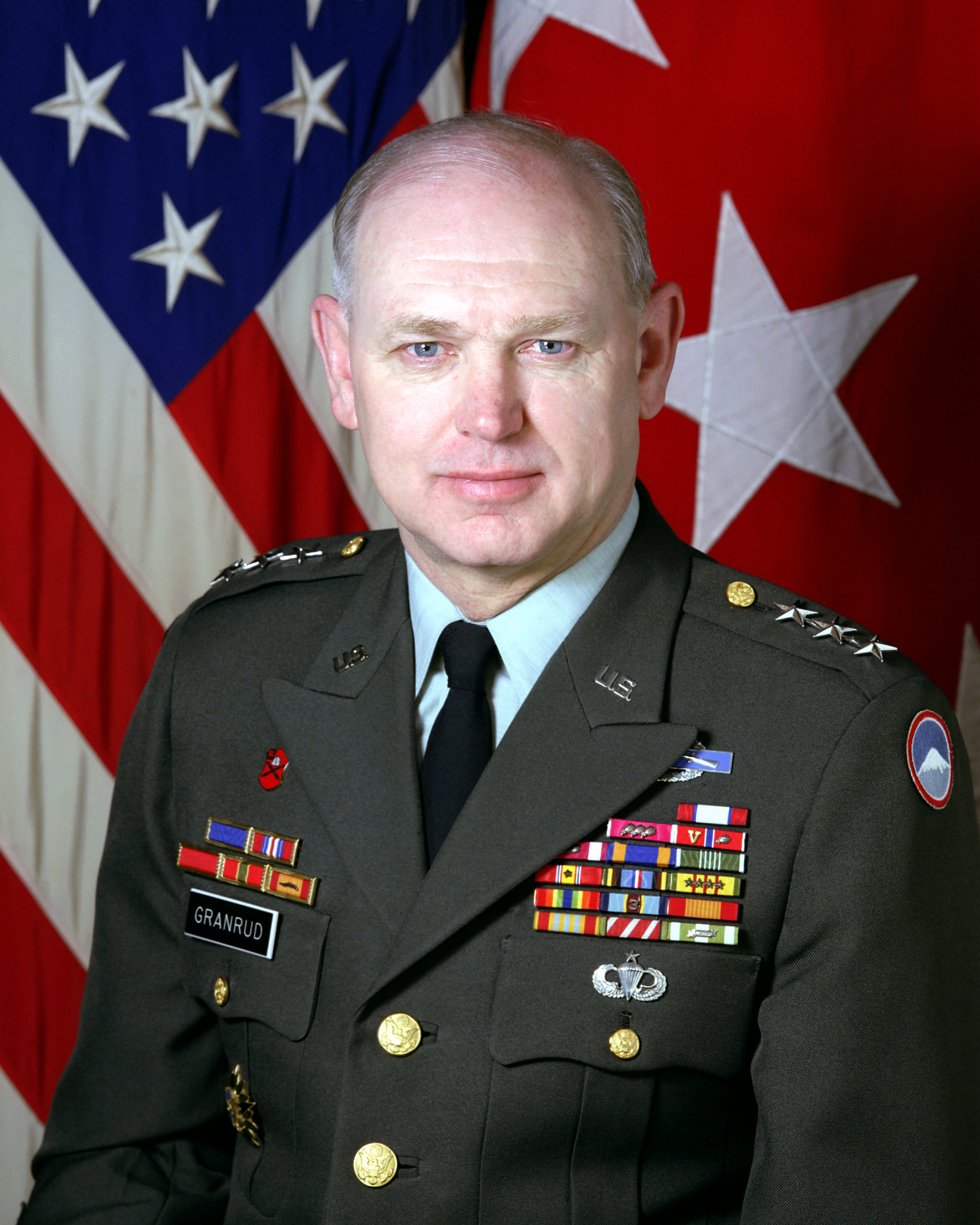
- Born: 10 April 1937; Minot, North Dakota U.S.
- Died: 18 March 2020 (aged 82)
- Military career
- Allegiance: United States
- Branch: United States Army
- Service years: 1960–1994
- Rank: Lieutenant General
- Commands: United States Army Japan; 210th Field Artillery Brigade; 6th Battalion, 10th Field Artillery Regiment
- Conflicts: Vietnam War
- Awards: Legion of Merit (4); Bronze Star Medal (6); Meritorious Service Medal (2); Air Medal

Jerome Halvor Granrud (10 April 1937 – 18 March 2020) was a lieutenant general in the United States Army whose assignments included commander United States Army Japan. He earned a B.A. degree in language studies from the University of Missouri in 1960.

== Personal ==
Granrud married Elizabeth Lillias Fancher on 12 August 1967 in Spokane, Washington. The couple had two children.
