= Glynn Mallory =

United States Army lieutenant general (1939–2020)

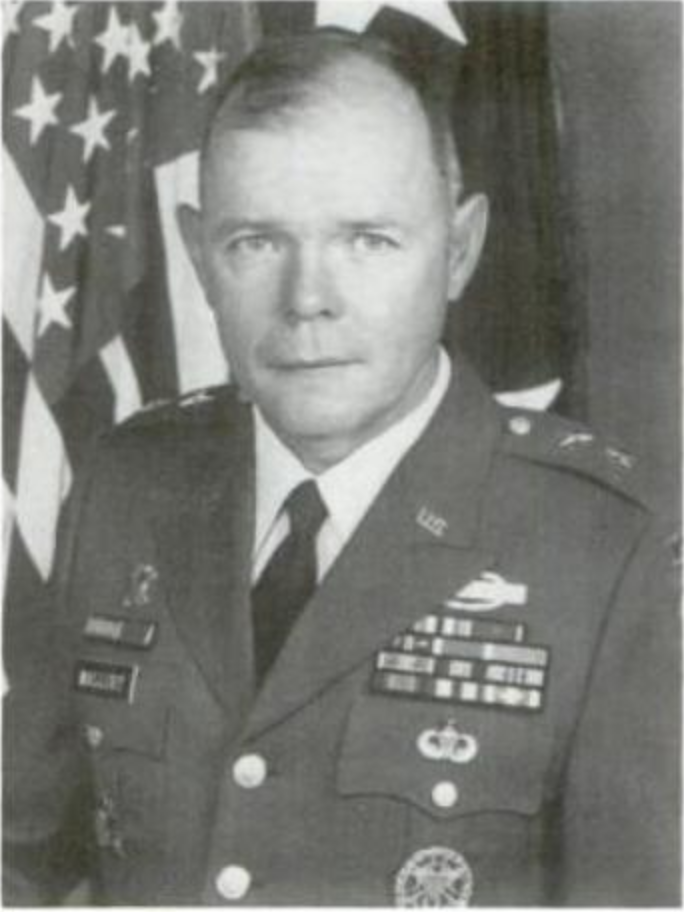
- Pictured as a major general
- Born: February 10, 1939; Natchez, Mississippi, U.S.
- Died: February 20, 2020 (aged 81); San Antonio, Texas, U.S.
- Military career
- Allegiance: United States
- Branch: United States Army
- Service years: 1961–1995
- Rank: Lieutenant General
- Commands: Sixth United States Army; 2nd Armored Division; 4th Brigade, 4th Infantry Division; 1st Battalion, 8th Infantry Regiment
- Conflicts: Vietnam War; Gulf War
- Awards: Army Distinguished Service Medal (3); Silver Star; Legion of Merit (2); Bronze Star Medal (6); Purple Heart

Glynn Clark Mallory Jr. (February 10, 1939 – February 20, 2020) was a lieutenant general in the United States Army. He was commissioned upon graduation from the United States Military Academy in 1961.

Mallory died on February 20, 2020.
