= William Pagonis =

United States Army general

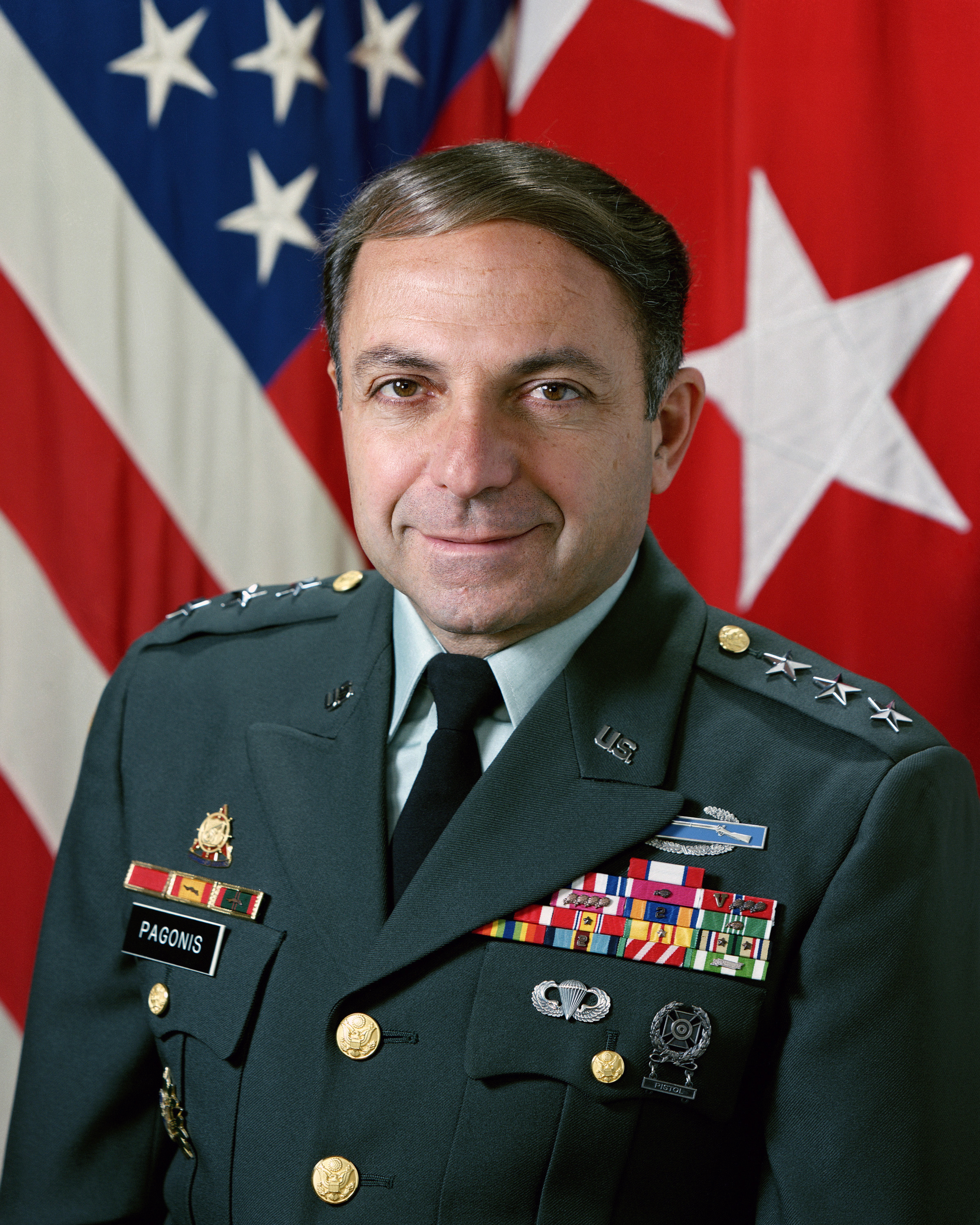
- Lieutenant General William Gus Pagonis
- Born: April 30, 1941 (age 85); Charleroi, Pennsylvania, U.S.
- Military career
- Allegiance: United States of America
- Branch: United States Army
- Service years: 1964–1993
- Rank: Lieutenant General
- Conflicts: Vietnam War; Operation Desert Storm
- Awards: Silver Star, Bronze Star with "V" device, Combat Infantryman Badge
- Other work: Executive Vice President of Logistics, Sears; Chairman, Defense Business Board; Chairman of the Board/Director, CEO of Direct Allergy, CEO of Epiphany, Harvest Partners, RailAmerica author

Lieutenant General William Gus Pagonis (born April 30, 1941) served as the director of American logistics during the Gulf War of 1991.

== Career ==
Pagonis served in the United States Army for 29 years, retiring with the three-star rank of lieutenant general.

He was commissioned into the United States (U.S.) Army through the Penn State University Army Reserve Officer Training Corps (ROTC) in 1964. Pagonis attended the U.S. Army Infantry School in 1965. From February 1967 to February 1968, he served in Vietnam as Commander of the 1097th Transportation Company. He returned to Vietnam from June 1970 to November 1970 as Division Transportation Officer, 101st Airborne Division (Airmobile) and through July 1971 as Executive Officer, 2d Battalion (Airmobile), 501st Infantry, 101st Airborne Division (Airmobile).

Pagonis was Commanding General of the 22nd Theater Army Area Command, United States Central Command, Saudi Arabia, from August 1990 to January 1992; Deputy Commanding General, Materiel Readiness/Executive Director for Conventional Ammunition, U.S. Army Materiel Command from January 1992 to June 1992; and Commanding General, 21st Theater Army Area Command, U.S. Army Europe and Seventh Army, Germany from June 1992 to October 1993. He retired October 31, 1993.

While in the service, Pagonis attended the U.S. Army Transportation School, Pennsylvania State University, the U.S. Army Command and General Staff College, and the U.S. Naval War College. He earned both a B.S. degree in Transportation and Traffic Management and a master's degree in Business Administration from Pennsylvania State University. He is also a brother of the Alpha Chi Rho fraternity. Pagonis is an American of Greek descent.

== Gulf War ==
Major General Pagonis served as Norman Schwarzkopf's logistics advisor during the Gulf War. Pagonis was actually the first American to arrive in Saudi Arabia, hours after it was decided to send troops. Lacking a hotel room, he had slept two nights in the back of his rented Chevrolet near the port of Dammam. He would be promoted to lieutenant general during the war.

Pagonis retired from the position of head Sears Logistics Group in 2004, becoming a Chairman of the Board/Director for RailAmerica. He is also Vice-Chairman of GENCO ATC, a logistics firm based out of Pittsburgh and previously served as an advisor to CombineNet, Inc. Pagonis is also an author, having written Moving Mountains: Lessons in Leadership and Logistics from the Gulf War, published by Harvard Business School Press.
