= Deputy Chief of Staff for Operations, Plans and Training (G-3/5/7) =

US Army position

Seal of the DCS, G-3/5/7

In the US Army, Joseph A. Ryan is the Deputy Chief of Staff for Operations, Plans, and Training (G-3/5/7) serving on Army Staff for operations (G-3), plans (G-5), and training (G-7). Both G-8 and G-3/5/7 sit on the Army Requirements Oversight Council (AROC), chaired by the Chief of Staff of the Army (CSA).

== List of Deputy Chiefs of Staff for Operations, Plans, and Training, G-3/5/7 ==
No.	Deputy Chief of Staff		Term		
No.	Portrait	Name	Took office	Left office	Term length
-	Daniel P. Bolger	Lieutenant General; Daniel P. Bolger (born 1957)	21 May 2010	6 September 2011	1 year, 108 days
-	John F. Campbell	Lieutenant General; John F. Campbell (born 1957)	6 September 2011	8 March 2013	1 year, 183 days
-	James L. Huggins Jr.	Lieutenant General; James L. Huggins Jr.	8 March 2013	May 2015	~2 years, 68 days
-	Joseph Anderson	Lieutenant General; Joseph Anderson (born 1959)	May 2015	27 June 2019	~4 years, 43 days
-	Charles A. Flynn	Lieutenant General; Charles A. Flynn (born c. 1963)	27 June 2019	~4 June 2021	~1 year, 342 days
-	James Rainey	Lieutenant General; James Rainey (born 1964/1965)	~4 June 2021	3 October 2022	~1 year, 121 days
-	Patrick Matlock	Lieutenant General; Patrick Matlock (born 1965)	3 October 2022	1 November 2024	2 years, 29 days
-	Joseph A. Ryan	Lieutenant General; Joseph A. Ryan (born c. 1969)	4 November 2024	4 December 2025	1 year, 30 days
