= United States Military Representative to the NATO Military Committee =

American military representative to the NATO Military Committee

- Flag of NATO

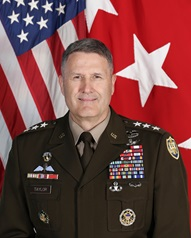
- Incumbent; LTG William D. Taylor, USA since November 12, 2025
- U.S. Delegation to the NATO Military Committee
- Type: Senior military representative
- Abbreviation: USMILREP
- Member of: NATO Military Committee
- Reports to: Chair of the NATO Military Committee
- Seat: Brussels, Belgium
- Appointer: The president with Senate advice and consent
- Term length: Not fixed; 2–3 years
- Inaugural holder: Omar Bradley
- Formation: 1950
- Deputy: Deputy United States Military Representative to the NATO Military Committee

The United States military representative to the NATO Military Committee (USMILREP) is the senior uniformed representative of the United States Armed Forces on the NATO Military Committee. The appointee, an officer of the United States Armed Forces at the rank of lieutenant general or vice admiral, represents the United States on the NATO Military Committee and is responsible for articulating and providing military advice to the Chair of the NATO Military Committee. The representative has a deputy who holds the one-star rank of brigadier general or rear admiral.

The position has been vacant since April 2025.

== List of representatives ==
| No. | Portrait | U.S. Military Representative | Took office | Left office | Time in office | Service branch |
|---|---|---|---|---|---|---|
| 1 | Omar Bradley | General of the Army; Omar Bradley (1893–1981) (Note: Served as Chairman of the NATO Military Committee from 1949 to 1951.) | September 1950 | August 15, 1953 | ~2 years, 348 days | U.S. Army |
| 2 | J. Lawton Collins | General; J. Lawton Collins (1896–1987) | August 15, 1953 | March 1956 | ~2 years, 199 days | U.S. Army |
| 3 | Leon W. Johnson | General; Leon W. Johnson (1904–1997) | April 1956 | April 1958 | ~2 years, 30 days | U.S. Air Force |
| 4 | Walter F. Boone | Admiral; Walter F. Boone (1898–1995) | April 1958 | May 1960 | ~2 years, 30 days | U.S. Navy |
| 5 | Clark L. Ruffner | General; Clark L. Ruffner (1903–1982) | May 1960 | October 1962 | ~2 years, 153 days | U.S. Army |
| 6 | Dean C. Strother | General; Dean C. Strother (1908–2000) | November 1962 | March 1965 | ~2 years, 120 days | U.S. Air Force |
| 7 | Alfred G. Ward | Admiral; Alfred G. Ward (1908–1982) | March 1965 | May 1968 | ~3 years, 61 days | U.S. Navy |
| 8 | Berton E. Spivy Jr. | General; Berton E. Spivy Jr. (1911–1997) | July 1968 | July 1971 | ~3 years, 0 days | U.S. Army |
| 9 | Theodore R. Milton | General; Theodore R. Milton (1915–2010) (Note: Served as Deputy Chairman of the NATO Military Committee from 1969 to 1971.) | August 1971 | July 1974 | ~2 years, 334 days | U.S. Air Force |
| 10 | John P. Weinel | Admiral; John P. Weinel (1916–2014) | August 1974 | August 1977 | ~3 years, 0 days | U.S. Navy |
| 11 | William A. Knowlton | General; William A. Knowlton (1920–2008) | August 1977 | June 1980 | ~2 years, 305 days | U.S. Army |
| 12 | Richard L. Lawson | General; Richard L. Lawson (1929–2020) | July 1980 | July 1981 | ~1 year, 0 days | U.S. Air Force |
| 13 | George E. R. Kinnear II | Admiral; George E. R. Kinnear II (1928–2015) | July 1981 | September 1982 | ~1 year, 62 days | U.S. Navy |
| 14 | Roscoe Robinson Jr. | General; Roscoe Robinson Jr. (1928–1993) | September 1982 | October 1985 | ~3 years, 30 days | U.S. Army |
| 15 | Jack N. Merritt | General; Jack N. Merritt (1930–2018) | October 1985 | September 1987 | ~1 year, 335 days | U.S. Army |
| 16 | Powell F. Carter Jr. | Admiral; Powell F. Carter Jr. (1931–2017) | September 1987 | October 1988 | ~1 year, 30 days | U.S. Navy |
| 17 | James R. Hogg | Admiral; James R. Hogg (born 1934) | October 1988 | May 1991 | ~2 years, 212 days | U.S. Navy |
| 18 | William D. Smith | Admiral; William D. Smith (1933–2020) | May 1991 | October 1993 | ~2 years, 153 days | U.S. Navy |
| 19 | Daniel W. Christman | Lieutenant General; Daniel W. Christman (born 1943) | October 1, 1993 | October 7, 1994 | 1 year, 6 days | U.S. Army |
| 20 | Thomas M. Montgomery | Lieutenant General; Thomas M. Montgomery (born 1941) | October 7, 1994 | September 1997 | ~2 years, 329 days | U.S. Army |
| 21 | Michael J. Byron | Lieutenant General; Michael J. Byron (born 1941) (Note: Served as Deputy Chairman of the NATO Military Committee from 1998 to 2001.) | September 1997 | September 25, 1998 | ~1 year, 24 days | U.S. Marine Corps |
| 22 | David S. Weisman | Lieutenant General; David S. Weisman (born 1946) | September 25, 1998 | July 2001 | ~2 years, 279 days | U.S. Army |
| 23 | Timothy A. Kinnan | Lieutenant General; Timothy A. Kinnan (born 1948) | July 2001 | August 2004 | ~3 years, 31 days | U.S. Air Force |
| 24 | Edward Hanlon Jr. | Lieutenant General; Edward Hanlon Jr. (born 1944) | September 2004 | September 2006 | ~2 years, 0 days | U.S. Marine Corps |
| 25 | William D. Sullivan | Vice Admiral; William D. Sullivan (born 1950) | November 2006 | December 2009 | ~3 years, 30 days | U.S. Navy |
| 26 | Richard K. Gallagher | Vice Admiral; Richard K. Gallagher (born 1952) | January 2010 | September 2012 | ~2 years, 244 days | U.S. Navy |
| 27 | David R. Hogg | Lieutenant General; David R. Hogg (born 1958) | September 2012 | September 2015 | ~3 years, 0 days | U.S. Army |
| 28 | John N. Christenson | Vice Admiral; John N. Christenson (born 1958) | October 2015 | October 2018 | ~3 years, 0 days | U.S. Navy |
| 29 | John K. Love | Lieutenant General; John K. Love | October 2018 | September 2021 | ~3 years, 0 days | U.S. Marine Corps |
| 30 | E. John Deedrick Jr. | Lieutenant General; E. John Deedrick Jr. | September 13, 2021 | May 2023 | ~1 year, 230 days | U.S. Army |
| 31 | Shoshana S. Chatfield | Vice Admiral; Shoshana S. Chatfield (born 1965) | December 13, 2023 | April 7, 2025 | 1 year, 115 days | U.S. Navy |
| - | Sean M. Flynn | Brigadier General; Sean M. Flynn; Acting | April 7, 2025 | November 12, 2025 | 219 days | U.S. Army |
| 32 | William D. Taylor | Lieutenant General; William D. Taylor | November 12, 2025 | Incumbent | 300 days | U.S. Army |
