= Paul LaCamera =

U.S. Army general

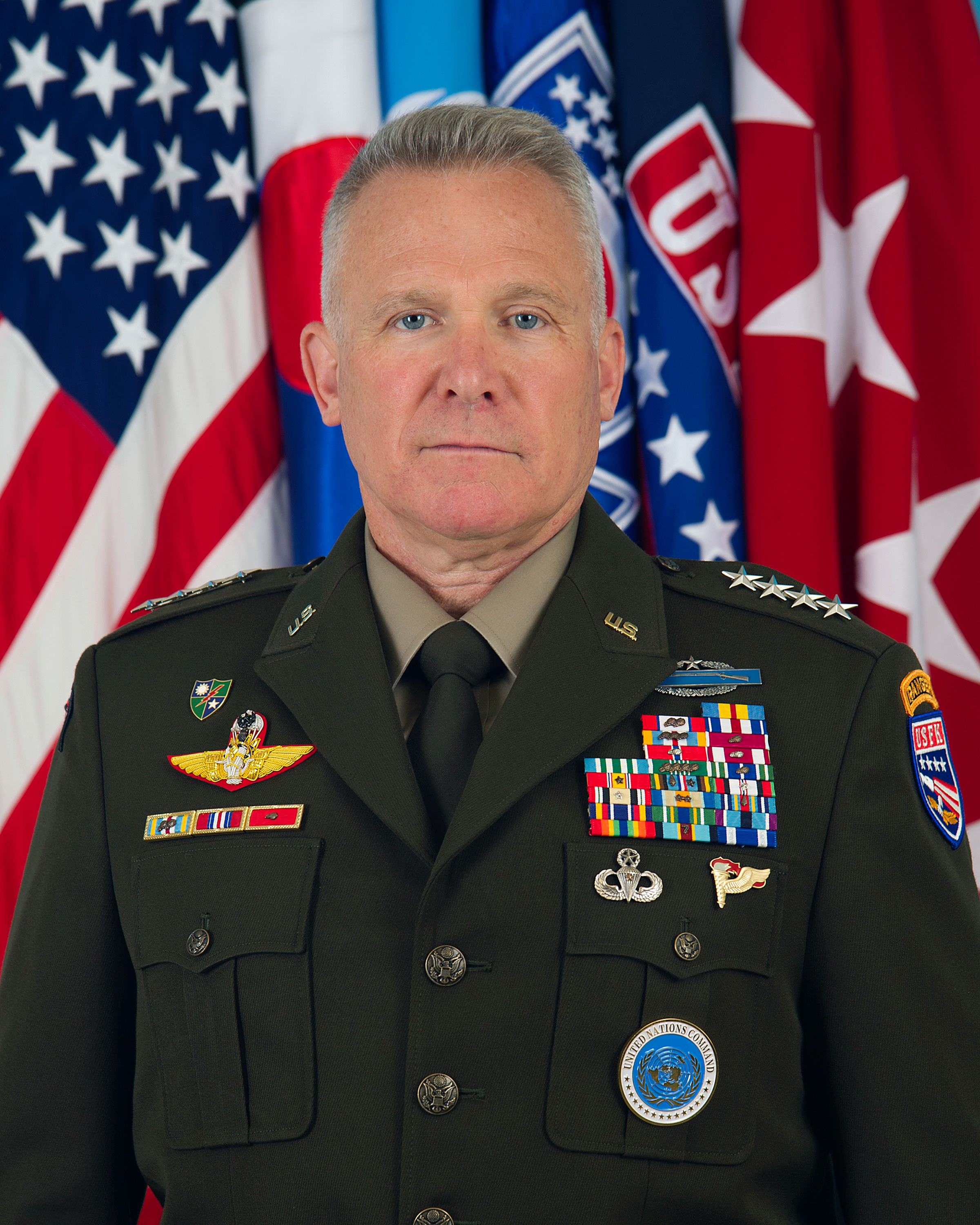
- Official portrait, 2021
- Born: 4 September 1963 (age 63); Westwood, Massachusetts, U.S.
- Military career
- Allegiance: United States
- Branch: United States Army
- Service years: 1985–2025
- Rank: General
- Commands: United Nations Command; ROK/US Combined Forces Command; United States Forces Korea; United States Army Pacific; Combined Joint Task Force – Operation Inherent Resolve; XVIII Airborne Corps; 4th Infantry Division; 75th Ranger Regiment; 3rd Ranger Battalion; 1st Battalion, 87th Infantry Regiment
- Conflicts: Invasion of Panama; Operation Uphold Democracy; War in Afghanistan; Iraq War; Operation Inherent Resolve
- Awards: Defense Distinguished Service Medal (2); Army Distinguished Service Medal (4); Silver Star; Defense Superior Service Medal (4); Legion of Merit (2); Bronze Star Medal (6)
- Paul LaCamera's voice LaCamera's opening statement at a Senate Armed Services Committee hearing on the 2022 USINDOPACOM posture Recorded 10 March 2022

Paul Joseph LaCamera (born 4 September 1963) is a retired United States Army general who last served as the commander of United Nations Command, ROK/US Combined Forces Command and United States Forces Korea from 2021 to 2024. LaCamera most recently served as commanding general of United States Army Pacific from 2019 to 2021. He previously served as the commanding general of XVIII Airborne Corps. His other assignments include the commander of Combined Joint Task Force – Operation Inherent Resolve and as the commanding general of the 4th Infantry Division.

He was nominated to replace General Robert Abrams as the next commander of United Nations Command, R.O.K.-U.S. Combined Forces Command, and U.S. Forces Korea, on 2 December 2020, however his nomination was returned to the president on 3 January 2021, without action. He was renominated on 27 April 2021.

== Military career ==
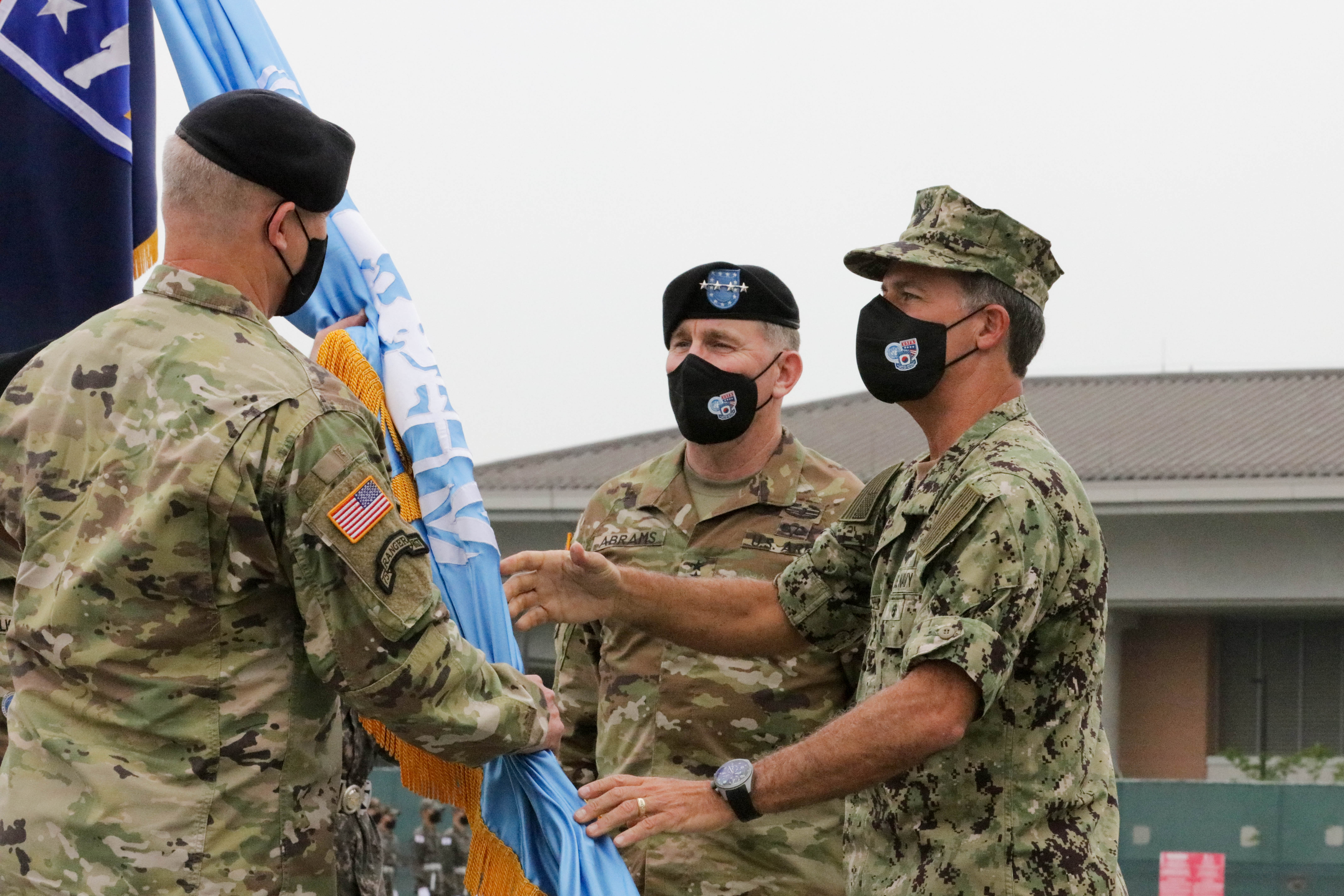
General Paul J. LaCamera receives the United Nations Command colors from Adm. John C. Aquilino, commander of U.S. Indo-Pacific Command, during the United Nations Command, Combined Forces Command, and U.S. Forces Korea change of command ceremony on 2 July 2021 at Barker Field.

LaCamera was commissioned a second lieutenant upon graduation from the United States Military Academy in 1985. He served as rifle platoon leader with C Company, 3d Battalion (Airborne), 504th Infantry, 82nd Airborne Division. Later he served as Company commander, 4th Ranger Training Battalion, Ranger Training Brigade, Operations Officer, 1st Battalion, 506th Infantry, 2d Infantry Division and Executive Officer, 1st Battalion, 75th Ranger Regiment. From February 2001 to May 2003, he commanded the 1st Battalion, 87th Infantry Regiment, 10th Mountain Division (Light), which deployed as part of Operation Anaconda to Afghanistan during which he was awarded the Silver Star. LaCamera then took command of the 3d Battalion, 75th Ranger Regiment at Fort Benning, Georgia from June 2003 to May 2004. Lacamera graduated from College of Naval Warfare, Naval War College located at Newport, Rhode Island in June 2005 before taking command of the 75th Ranger Regiment from August 2005 to August 2007. Following this command, he became the Director of Operations, Joint Special Operations Command from 2007 to 2009. In 2009, he became the Assistant Commanding General, Joint Special Operations Command. From 2010 to 2012, LaCamera served as the Deputy Commanding General (Operations), 25th Infantry Division. He later served as commanding general XVIII Airborne Corps and commander of Combined Joint Task Force-Operation Inherent Resolve.

== Family and personal life ==
LaCamera is a native of Westwood, Massachusetts.

== Training and education ==
LaCamera earned a Bachelor of Science degree from the United States Military Academy and a Master of Arts in National Security and Strategic Studies from the United States Army War College. His military education includes the Infantry Officer Basic and Advanced Courses, the Army Command and General Staff College, the Army War College, the Naval War College, and the Senior Service College Fellowship Course.

== Awards and decorations ==
Combat Infantryman Badge with Star (denoting 2nd award)
Expert Infantryman Badge
Ranger tab
Master Combat Parachutist Badge with one bronze jump star
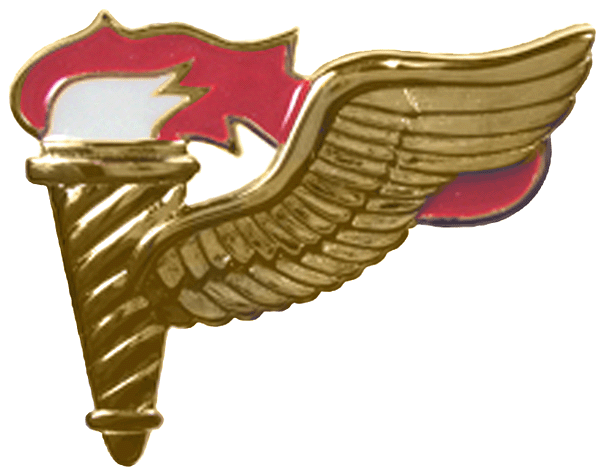
Pathfinder Badge
United Nations Command Badge
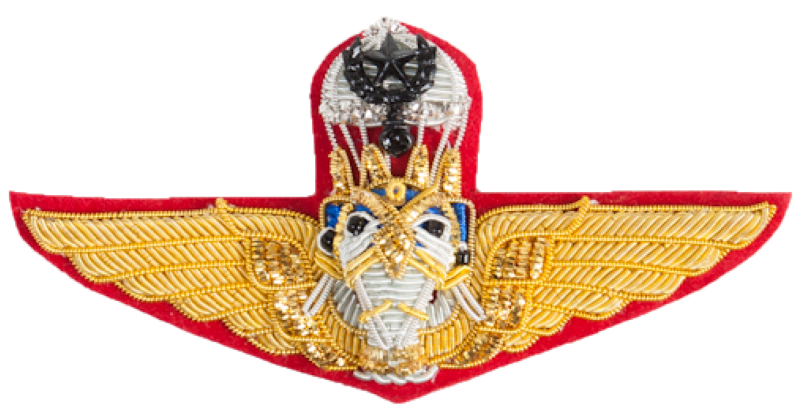
Royal Thai Army Parachutist Badge
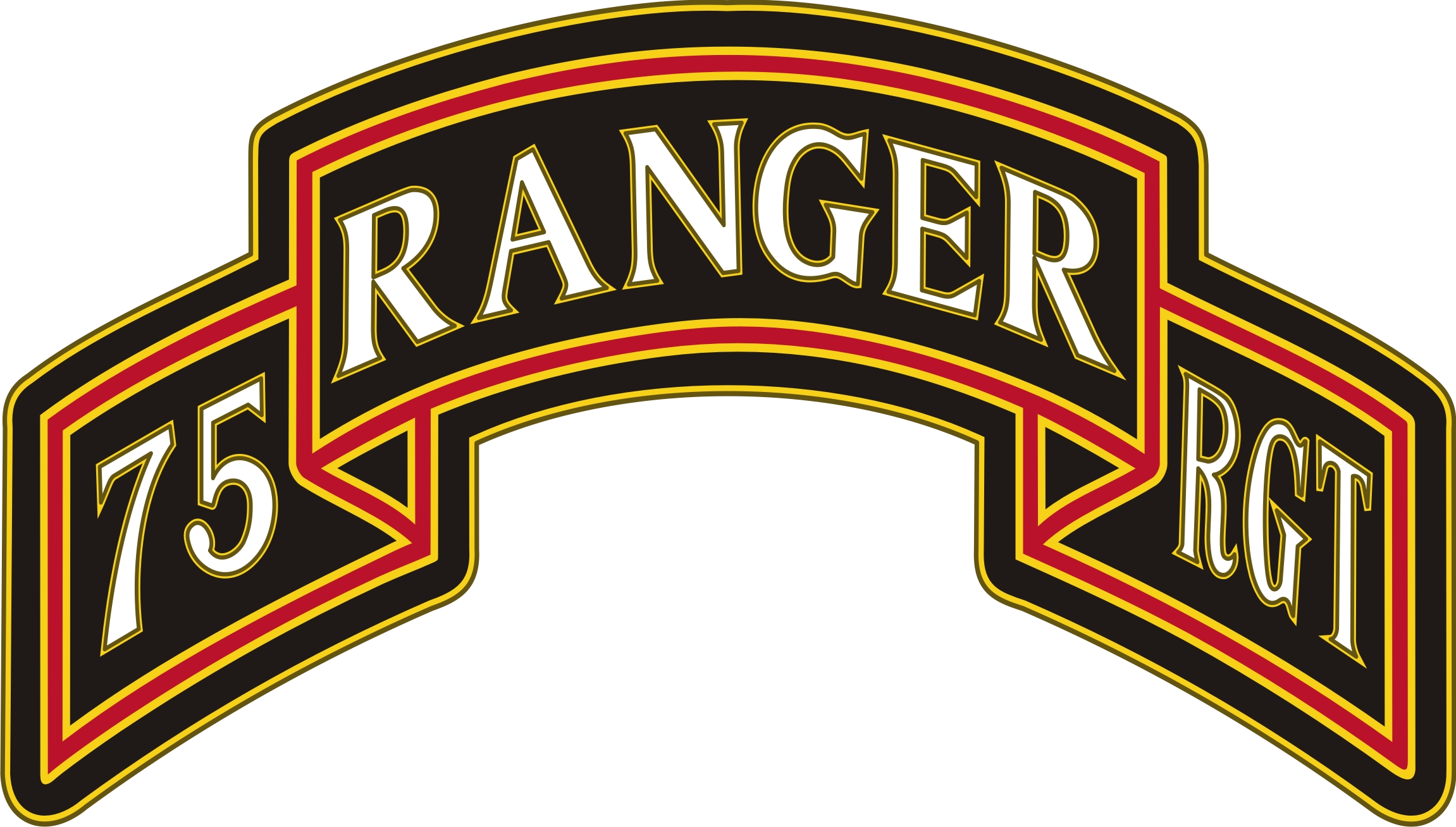
75th Ranger Regiment Combat Service Identification Badge
75th Ranger Regiment Distinctive Unit Insignia
18 Overseas Service Bars

Defense Distinguished Service Medal with oak leaf cluster
Army Distinguished Service Medal with three bronze oak leaf clusters
Silver Star
Defense Superior Service Medal with three oak leaf clusters
Legion of Merit with oak leaf cluster
Bronze Star Medal with silver oak leaf cluster
Meritorious Service Medal with silver oak leaf cluster
Joint Service Commendation Medal
Army Commendation Medal with four oak leaf clusters
Army Achievement Medal with oak leaf cluster
Joint Meritorious Unit Award with two oak leaf clusters
Valorous Unit Award
Meritorious Unit Commendation with oak leaf cluster
National Defense Service Medal with one bronze service star
Armed Forces Expeditionary Medal with Arrowhead device and service star
Afghanistan Campaign Medal with five campaign stars
Iraq Campaign Medal with five campaign stars
Inherent Resolve Campaign Medal with two campaign stars
Global War on Terrorism Expeditionary Medal with Arrowhead device
Global War on Terrorism Service Medal
Korea Defense Service Medal
Humanitarian Service Medal
Army Service Ribbon
Army Overseas Service Ribbon with bronze award numeral 7
NATO Medal for service with ISAF

Military offices
Preceded by James C. Nixon	Commander of the 75th Ranger Regiment; 2005–2007	Succeeded by Richard D. Clarke
Preceded by ???	Assistant Commanding General of Joint Special Operations Command; 2009–2010	Succeeded by Marshall B. Webb
Preceded by Joseph Anderson	Commanding General of the 4th Infantry Division; 2013–2015	Succeeded by Ryan F. Gonsalves
Preceded by John Michael Bednarek	Chief of the Office of Security Cooperation-Iraq; 2015–2016	Succeeded by Scott McKean
Preceded by Jefforey A. Smith	Deputy Commanding General of XVIII Airborne Corps; 2016–2018	Succeeded by Brian J. McKiernan
Preceded by Stephen J. Townsend	Commanding General of XVIII Airborne Corps; 2018–2019	Succeeded by Michael Kurilla
Preceded by Paul E. Funk II	Commanding General of Combined Joint Task Force – Operation Inherent Resolve; 2018–2019	Succeeded by Robert P. White
Preceded by Robert Brooks Brown	Commanding General of United States Army Pacific; 2019–2021	Succeeded by Charles A. Flynn
Preceded by Robert B. Abrams	Commander of United Nations Command; Commander of United States Forces Korea; Commander of ROK/US Combined Forces Command; 2021–2024	Succeeded by Xavier Brunson
