= Combined Security Transition Command – Afghanistan =

Combined Security Transition Command-Afghanistan
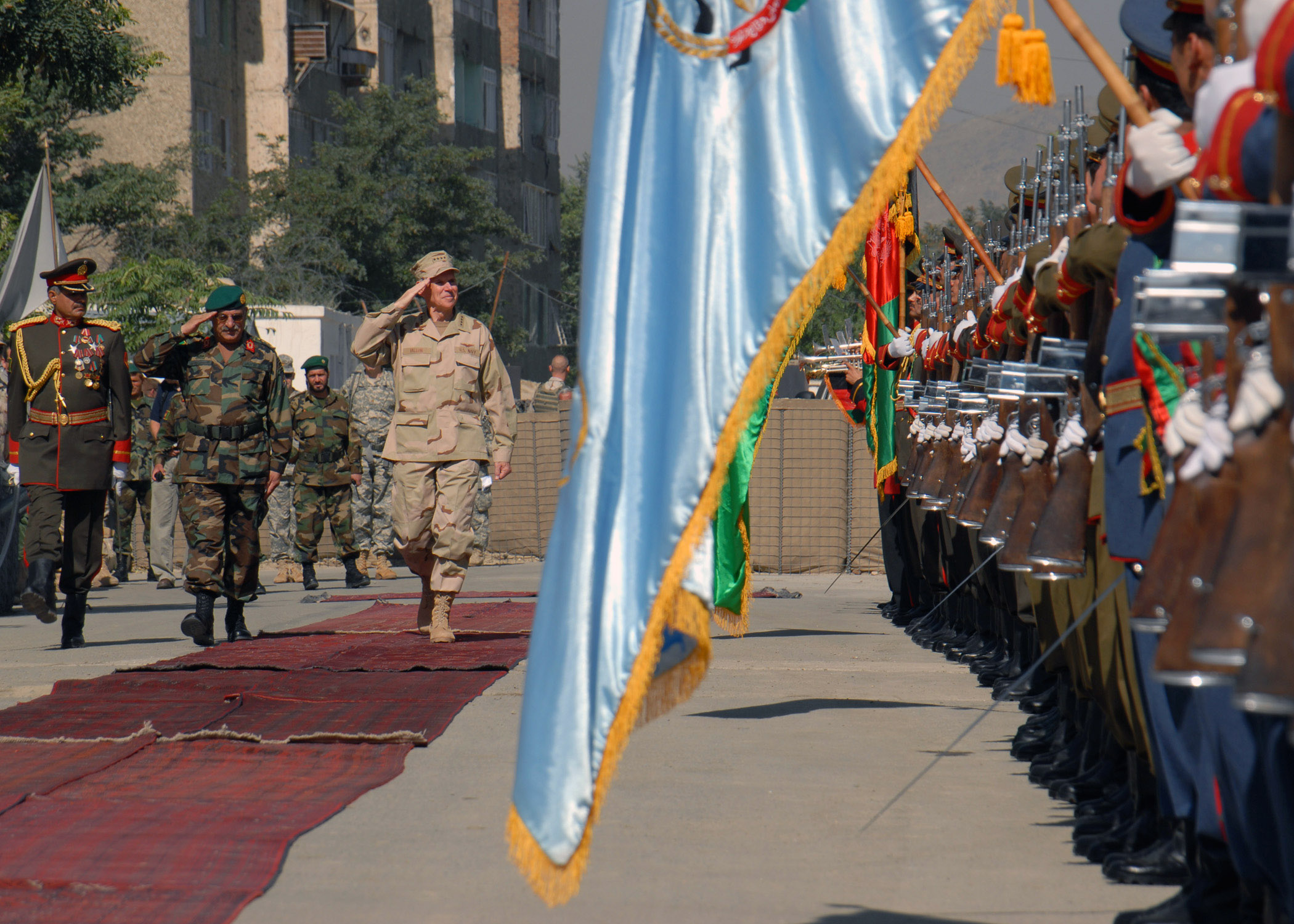
- Admiral William J. Fallon, Commander of U.S. Central Command, salutes the Afghan honor guard on hand at the change of command ceremony in 2007.
- Active: 2006–2021
- Headquarters: Kabul, Afghanistan
- Engagements: War in Afghanistan
- Decorations: Joint Meritorious Unit Award (8)

Commanders
- Notable commanders: Lieutenant General E. John Deedrick Jr.

The Combined Security Transition Command – Afghanistan (CSTC-A, pronounced "see stick-uh") was a multinational, U.S. led, military organization during the War in Afghanistan.

As of 2019, the organization's missions were:

- Budget, account, and execute more than $50 billion in Afghanistan Security Force Funds across multiple fiscal years.
- Manage all foreign military sales for the Afghan National Defense Security Forces (ANDSF).
- Plan, budget, and execute all of the infrastructure projects in support of the Afghanistan National Defense and Security Forces.
- Train, Advise and Assist the Afghanistan government in these areas:
  - Plan, Program, Budget, and Execute
  - Transparency, Accountability, and Oversight
  - Rule of Law
  - Sustainment

== History ==
In April 2006, the Combined Security Transition Command-Afghanistan (CSTC-A) was formed from the Office of Security Cooperation-Afghanistan. In partnership with the government of the Islamic Republic of Afghanistan (GIRoA) and the North Atlantic Treaty Organization (NATO), CSTC-A was charged with planning, programming, and implementing reform of the Afghan Security Forces consisting of the Afghan National Army (ANA) and the Afghan National Police (ANP) in order to develop a stable Afghanistan, strengthen the rule of law, and deter and defeat terrorism within its borders.

In April 2009, the Strasbourg-Kehl Summit made the decision to establish NATO Training Mission-Afghanistan (NTM-A), an organization responsible for the training and development of Afghan Security Forces. Seven months later, on November 21, 2009, NTM-A was formally activated under CSTC-A. With the headquarters at Camp Eggers, Kabul, the Commander of the organization commanded both CSTC-A and NTM-A. At its peak structure, CSTC-A/NTM-A was an 8,000-member advisor/mentor, combat theater forward-deployed strategic command recognized as an Army Corps-level Headquarters. With the Train, Advise and Assist (TAA) mission associated with the Ministry of Defense (MoD), Ministry of Interior (MoI), and Non-Security Ministries, the organization was known as the Deputy Commander - Ministerial Advisor Group, or DCOM-MAG.

In November 2013, with NTM-A functionally aligned under International Security Assistance Force's Joint Command (IJC), NTM-A and CSTC-A disaggregated, allowing each organization to focus on its unique mission set. Several months later, CSTC-A prepared Camp Eggers for turnover to the U.S. Department of State and transferred the unit's personnel and equipment to the Headquarters International Security Assistance Force (HQ ISAF) compound while simultaneously drawing down to Resolute Support mission numbers.

With the realignment of advisors toward establishing a Functionally-Based Security Force Assistance set in July 2014, DCOM-MAG/CSTC-A was recast as the Deputy Chief of Staff Security Assistance (DCOS SA)/CSTC-A. Along with the mission to budget, account, and execute more than $50 billion of Afghanistan Security Force Funds across multiple fiscal years, manage all foreign military sales for the Afghan National Defense Security Forces (ANDSF), and plan, budget, and execute all of the infrastructure projects in support of the ANDSF, DCOS SA/CSTC-A currently provides the TAA mission for four Essential Functions – EF1 (Plan, Program, Budget, and Execute), EF2 (Transparency, Accountability, and Oversight), EF3 (Rule of Law), and EF5 (Sustainment).

DOD shut CSTC-A down in June 2021 and transferred many of its responsibilities to DOD’s newly created Defense Security Cooperation Management Office-Afghanistan (DSCMO-A).

Campaign participation credit

- Afghanistan:
  - Consolidation I
  - Consolidation II
  - Consolidation III
  - Transition I
  - Transition II

== List of commanders ==
- MG Robert Durbin, 2006-2007
- MG Robert W. Cone, 2007-2008
- MG Richard P. Formica, 2008-2009
- LTG William B. Caldwell, IV, 2009-2011
- LTG Daniel P. Bolger, 2011-2013
- LTG Kenneth E. Tovo, 2013-2013
- MG Kevin R. Wendel, 2013-2014
- MG Todd T. Semonite, 2014-2015
- MG Gordon B. Davis Jr., 2015-2016
- MG Richard Kaiser, 2016-2017
- MG Robin Fontes, July 2017–October 2018
- LTG James Rainey, October 2018–November 2019
- LTG E. John Deedrick, November 2019–July 2021

== Unit decorations ==
Ribbon	Award	Year	Notes
	Joint Meritorious Unit Award	FEB 2004 - NOV 2004	for Joint service in Afghanistan
	Joint Meritorious Unit Award	JAN 2005 - DEC 2005	for Joint service in Afghanistan
	Joint Meritorious Unit Award	2006–2007	for Joint service in Afghanistan
	Joint Meritorious Unit Award	2007–2008	for service in Afghanistan
	Joint Meritorious Unit Award	2009–2010	for service in Afghanistan (dual hatted with NTM-A)
	Joint Meritorious Unit Award	2010–2011	for service in Afghanistan (dual hatted with NTM-A)
	Joint Meritorious Unit Award	2011-2012	for service in Afghanistan (dual hatted with NTM-A)
	Joint Meritorious Unit Award	2012-2013	for Joint service in Afghanistan
