= William D. Sullivan =

United States admiral (born 1950)

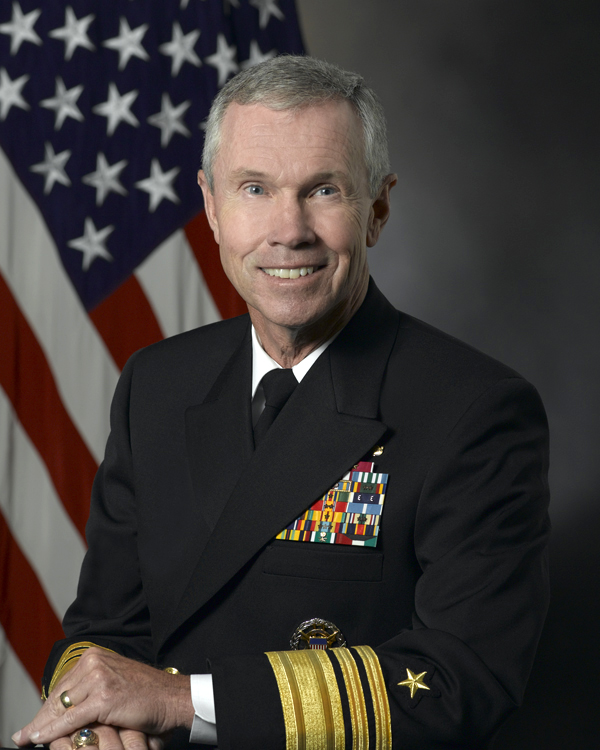
- Vice Admiral William Sullivan
- Born: 1950 (age 75–76)
- Allegiance: United States of America
- Branch: United States Navy
- Service years: 1972–2009
- Rank: Vice Admiral
- Commands: Strategic Plans and Policy on the Joint Staff; USS Cowpens; USS Sampson
- Conflicts: Persian Gulf War: Operation Desert Shield; Operation Desert Storm; Iraq War: Operation Iraqi Freedom

William Daniel Sullivan (born 1950) is a retired United States Navy vice admiral who served as the U.S. military representative to the North Atlantic Treaty Organization.

Sullivan also served as Vice Director for Strategic Plans and Policy on the Joint Staff, and as Director to the U.S. Pacific Command for Strategy and Plans. He commanded USS Sampson (DDG-10) during Operations Desert Shield and Desert Storm and USS Cowpens (CG-63) during Persian Gulf combat operations.

== Education ==
- Bachelor's degree from Florida State University in 1972.
- Master's degree in national security studies from Georgetown University in 1990.
- Master's degree in national security strategy from the National War College in 1994.

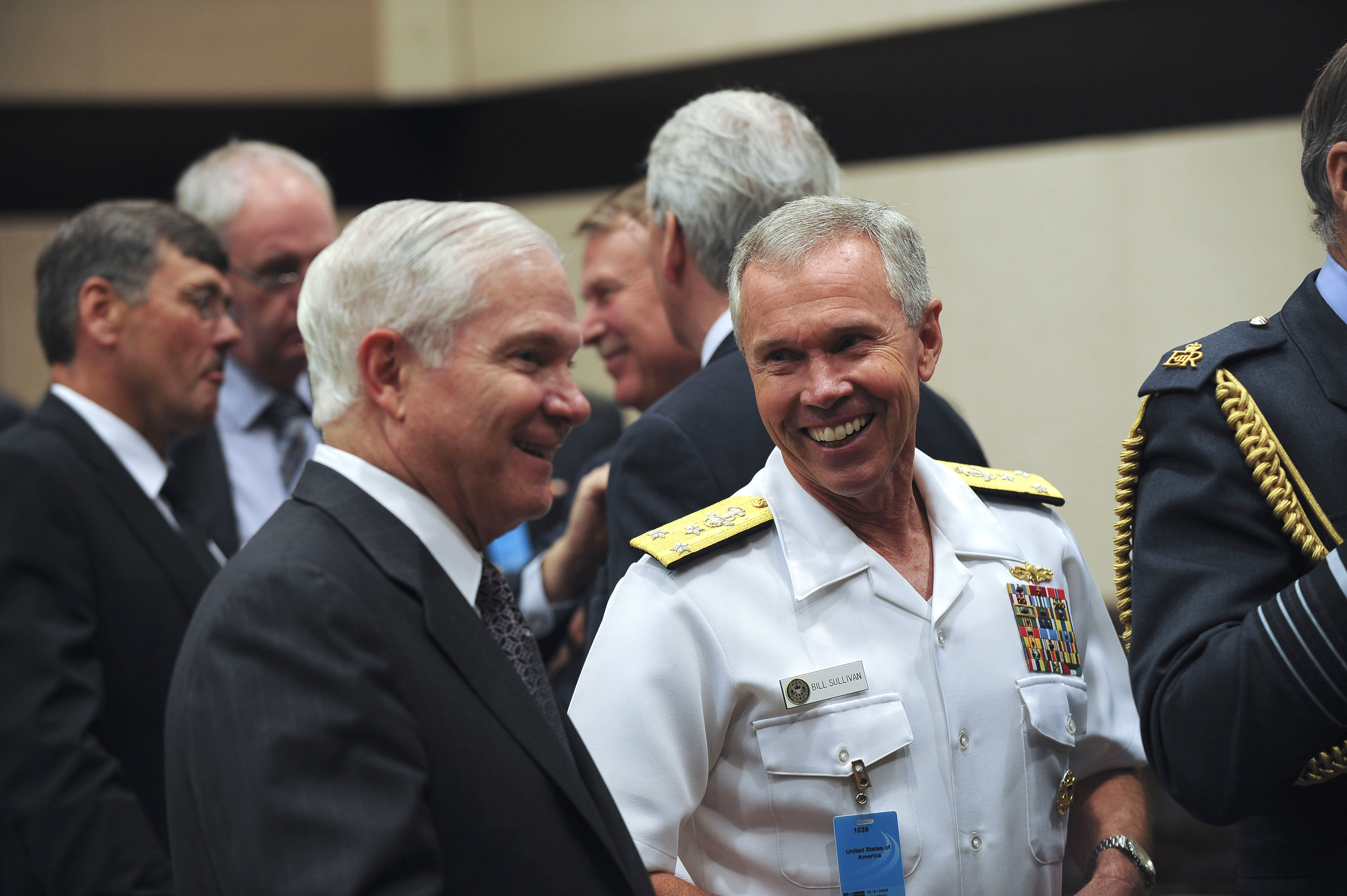
In 2009 with Bob Gates
