= Shoshana Chatfield =

Retired American admiral (born 1965)

Shoshana S. Chatfield
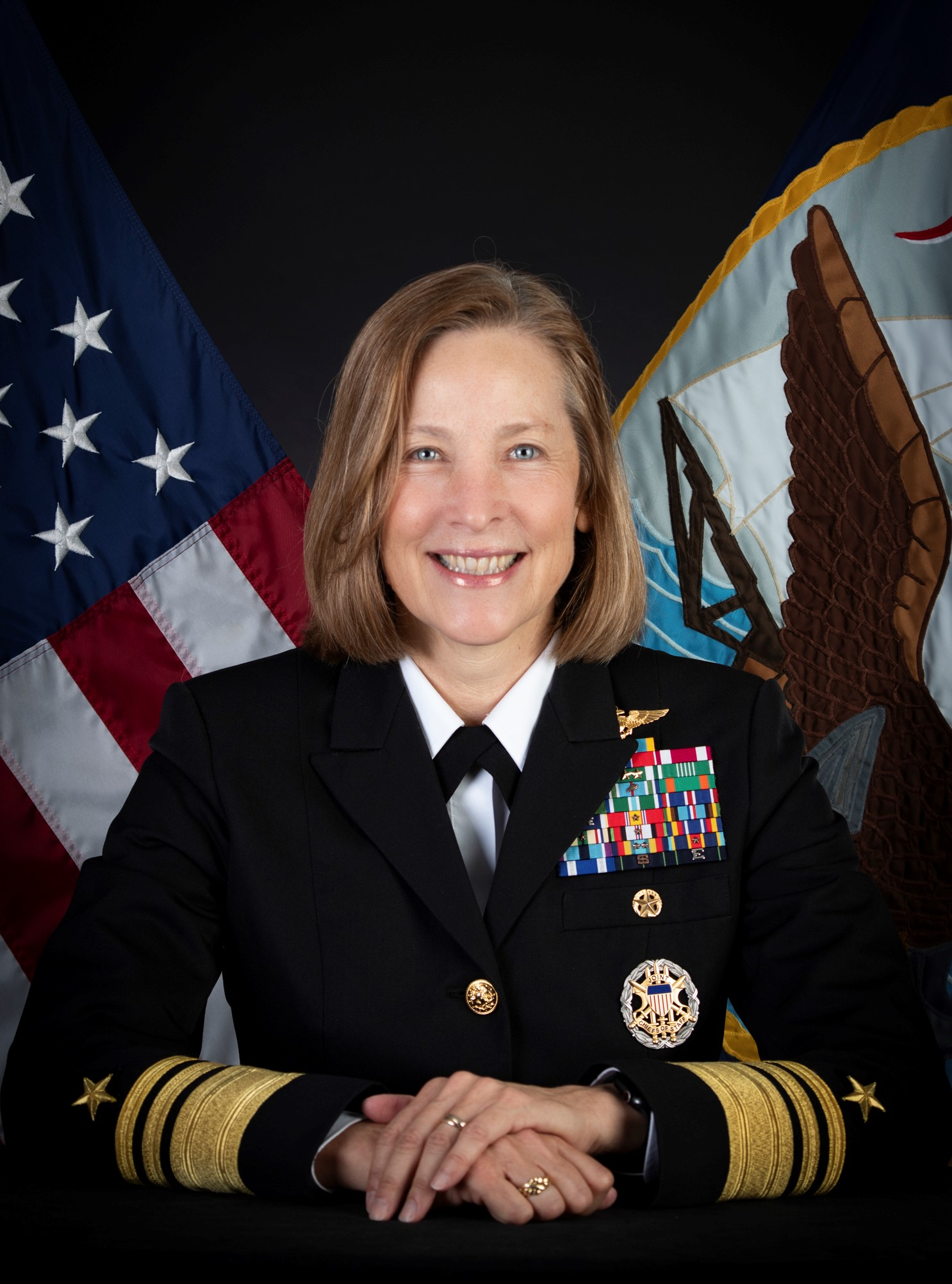
- Vice Admiral Chatfield in 2023
- Born: October 5, 1965 (age 61); Orange County, California, USA
- Education: Boston University (BA); Harvard University (MPA); University of San Diego (EdD)
- Military career
- Allegiance: United States of America
- Branch: United States Navy
- Service years: 1988 – 2025
- Rank: Vice Admiral
- Commands: Naval War College; Joint Region Marianas; Joint Provincial Reconstruction Team, Farah Province; Helicopter Sea Combat Wing, Pacific Fleet; HSC-25; HC-5
- Conflicts: War in Afghanistan
- Awards: Navy Distinguished Service Medal; Defense Superior Service Medal; Legion of Merit (2); Bronze Star

Shoshana Simone Chatfield (born October 5, 1965) is a retired United States Navy vice admiral. She served as the president of the Naval War College from 2019 to 2023 and was the first woman to hold that position. Chatfield then served as United States Military Representative to the NATO Military Committee from December 2023 to April 2025.

== Early life and education ==
Shoshana Chatfield grew up in Garden Grove, California, and graduated from Pacifica High School in 1983. She then received her bachelor's degree in International Relations and French from Boston University in 1987. After she received a commission in the Navy, she attended the Kennedy School of Government at Harvard University and received a Master of Public Administration. Chatfield later received a Doctor of Education degree from the University of San Diego. Chatfield is Jewish.

== Military career ==
Promotions
| Rank | Date |
|---|---|
| Vice Admiral | December 13, 2023 |
| Rear Admiral | April 1, 2020 |
| Rear Admiral (Lower Half) | Selected May 2015 |
| Captain | February 1, 2009 |
| Commander | August 1, 2002 |
| Lieutenant Commander | Selected September 1996 |

Chatfield commissioned through Boston University's Naval Reserve Officers Training Corps program, and in 1989 qualified as a naval helicopter pilot. She piloted the Boeing Vertol CH-46 Sea Knight, Sikorsky SH-3 Sea King, and the Sikorsky MH-60S Seahawk while attached to Helicopter Combat Support and Helicopter Sea Combat squadrons.

From 2001 to 2004, she was an assistant professor of political science at the United States Air Force Academy.

Chatfield later served as commander of a Provincial Reconstruction Team in Afghanistan, overseeing civil-military relations in Farah Province. She started her time as commander in 2008.

She later served as deputy commodore and later as commodore of Helicopter Sea Combat Wing, Pacific Fleet.

She was a senior military assistant to SACEUR, and served as the deputy United States military representative to the NATO Military Committee (USMILREP).

As rear admiral, Chatfield commanded Joint Region Marianas from 2017 to 2019. Under her leadership, the command provided humanitarian aid during the aftermath of Typhoon Yutu in 2018. The relief mission under FEMA leadership was concluded in February 2019.

Chatfield assumed her duties as commander of the Naval War College in August 2019 and was its commander until 2023.

In February 2023, Chatfield was nominated for promotion to vice admiral and assignment as the 31st USMILREP. She was confirmed by the U.S. Senate on December 13, 2023.

On April 7, 2025, it was reported that Chatfield had been removed from her NATO post by the Trump administration. The following day, a Pentagon spokesperson said that Secretary of Defense Hegseth had removed Chatfield due to "a loss of confidence in her ability to lead". Democrat House Representative Jasmine Crockett later claimed, without evidence, that the loss of confidence stemmed from Chatfield's refusal to display portraits of President Trump and Hegseth.

ABC News subsequently reported that Secretary Hegseth had been contacted by the conservative American Accountability Foundation, outlining LinkedIn posts, made by Chatfield in 2015, viewed of being in support of D.E.I. initiatives at the Department of Defense, potentially leading to her removal.

== Honors and awards ==
In addition to her military honors, Admiral Chatfield has received recognition from the government of Guam for her leadership and contributions to the island. In 2009, she was named as one of Boston University's distinguished alumni. Chatfield also received the Ellis Island Medal of Honor.

Military offices
| Preceded by Jeffrey A. Harley | 57th President of the Naval War College; 2019–2023 | Succeeded by Peter A. Garvin |
| Vacant Title last held by E. John Deedrick | United States Military Representative to the NATO Military Committee; 2024–2025 | Succeeded by Sean M. Flynn; Acting |
