= James Rainey =

U.S. Army general

James E. Rainey
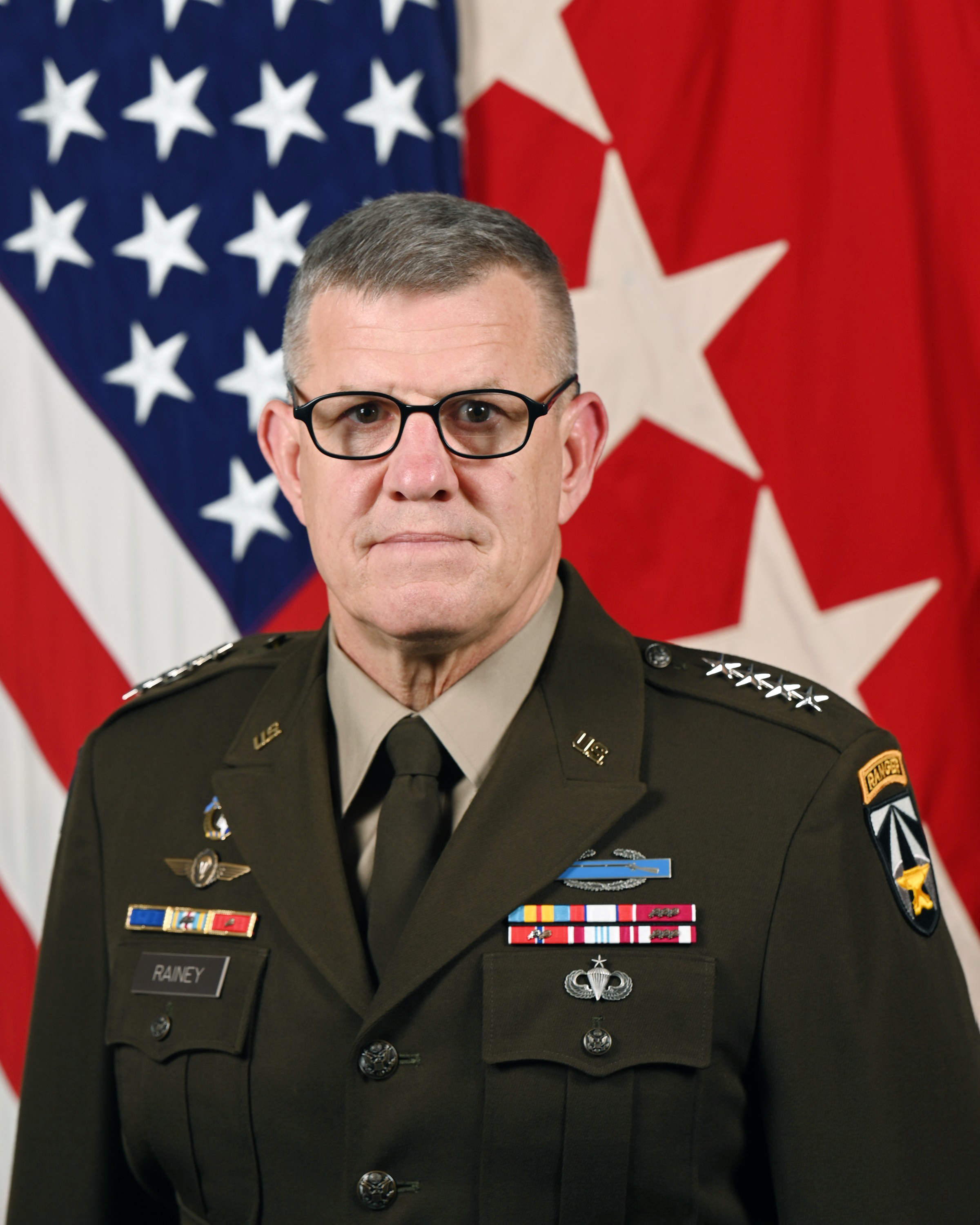
- Official portrait, 2022
- Born: 1964 or 1965 (age 61–62); Brockton, Massachusetts, U.S.
- Military career
- Allegiance: United States
- Branch: United States Army
- Service years: 1987–2025
- Rank: General
- Commands: United States Army Futures Command; United States Army Combined Arms Center; United States Army Command and General Staff College; Combined Security Transition Command – Afghanistan; 3rd Infantry Division; United States Army Infantry School; 3rd Brigade Combat Team, 4th Infantry Division; 2nd Battalion, 7th Cavalry Regiment
- Conflicts: War in Afghanistan; Iraq War
- Awards: Defense Distinguished Service Medal; Army Distinguished Service Medal; Legion of Merit (4); Bronze Star Medal (7)
- James Rainey's voice Rainey's opening statement at a House Armed Services Tactical Air and Land Forces Subcommittee hearing on FY2024 Army modernization programs Recorded 26 April 2023

James E. Rainey (born 1964 or 1965) is a former United States Army general who last served as the commanding general of United States Army Futures Command from 2022 to 2025. He previously served as Deputy Chief of Staff of the Army for Operations, Plans, and Training (G-3/5/7) from 2021 to 2022. Before that, he served concurrently as commanding general of the United States Army Combined Arms Center, commandant of the United States Army Command and General Staff College and commanding general of Fort Leavenworth, from 2019 to 2021. Prior to that, he commanded the Combined Security Transition Command – Afghanistan from 2018 to 2019.

== Early life and education ==
Rainey was born in Brockton, Massachusetts but grew up in Akron, Ohio. He attended Eastern Kentucky University on a swimming scholarship, graduating in 1987. He holds master's degrees from the United States Army Command and General Staff College (School of Advanced Military Studies) and Troy University.

== Army career ==
Rainey was commissioned as an infantry officer through ROTC at Eastern Kentucky University in 1987. As a lieutenant, he served as a platoon leader and company executive officer in the 3rd Battalion, 505th Parachute Infantry Regiment, 82nd Airborne Division and later as a rifle platoon leader and company executive officer in the 3rd Battalion, 75th Ranger Regiment.

Following the Infantry Advanced Course, he commanded the Long Range Surveillance Detachment in the 1st Cavalry Division and Hotel Company, 3rd U.S. Infantry (The Old Guard). Rainey was then assigned as a Joint Chiefs of Staff intern in Washington, D.C. His next assignments included: chief of plans for the 2nd Infantry Division; operations officer for 1st Battalion, 9th Cavalry; and executive officer to the III Corps commander.

During Operation Iraqi Freedom I, he was a G3 operations officer in the V Corps assault command post. Following that, he was the executive officer of the 3rd Brigade Combat Team, 1st Cavalry Division, and then he commanded Task Force 2-7 CAV during Operation Iraqi Freedom II. Following battalion command, Rainey served as the chief of war on terror plans for U.S. European Command. He next served as the G3 of the 4th Infantry Division and the Multi-National Division-Baghdad (MND-B), and commanded the 3rd Heavy Brigade Combat Team (HBCT), 4th Infantry Division at Fort Carson and in Iraq. Following command, he served as the U.S. Army Fellow at the Korbel School of International Relations, Denver University.

Rainey became the deputy commanding general (maneuver) of the 4th Infantry Division in July 2013, and was promoted to brigadier general on 2 August 2013. From July 2014 to July 2015, he served as the commandant of the United States Army Infantry School. He was then the commanding general of the 3rd Infantry Division until May 2017, and was promoted to major general on 2 May 2016. From June 2017 to August 2018, Rainey was the Assistant Deputy Chief of Staff of the United States Army. He became the commander of the Combined Security Transition Command – Afghanistan in October 2018, and in the same month was promoted to lieutenant general. He was the commanding general of the United States Army Combined Arms Center and Commandant of the United States Army Command and General Staff College from December 2019 to May 2021.

From June 2021 to October 2022, Rainey was the Deputy Chief of Staff of the Army for Operations, Plans, and Training (G-3/5/7), in Washington, D.C. On 6 September 2022, Rainey was nominated for promotion to general and assigned as commanding general of the United States Army Futures Command. His nomination was confirmed by voice vote of the Senate on 29 September 2022. Rainey was promoted on 4 October 2022 and took up his post as commander of Army Futures Command. He retired on 1 October 2025, when Futures Command was merged with the Training and Doctrine Command to form the new United States Army Transformation and Training Command.

== Personal life ==
He met his wife Tracy while they were at Eastern Kentucky University, and they have been married since 1988. They have two daughters, two sons-in-law, and a grandson.

== Awards and decorations ==
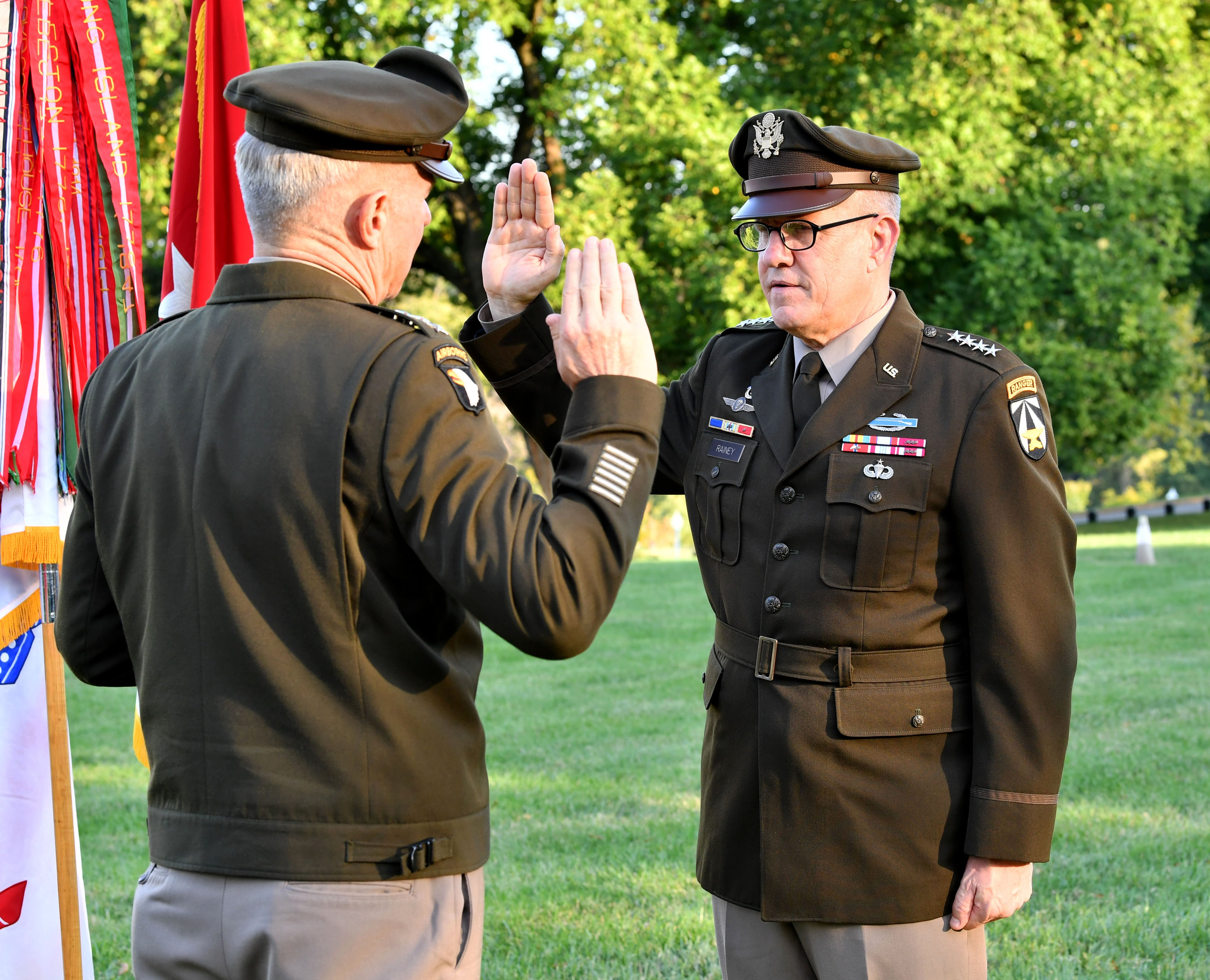
Rainey's promotion ceremony to general, being sworn in by Army chief of staff James C. McConville, October 2022.

Combat Infantryman Badge
Expert Infantryman Badge
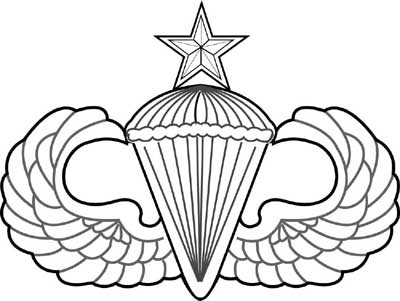
Senior Parachutist Badge
Ranger tab
Air Assault Badge
Joint Chiefs of Staff Identification Badge
Army Staff Identification Badge
3rd Infantry Division Combat Service Identification Badge
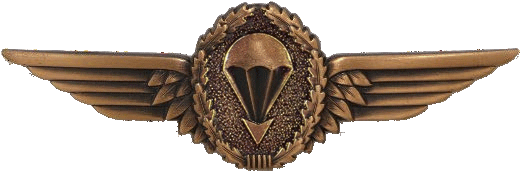
German Parachutist badge in bronze
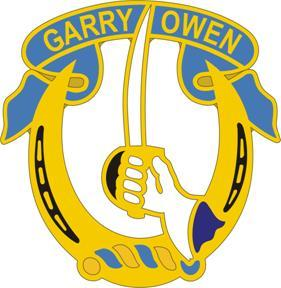
7th Cavalry Regiment Distinctive Unit Insignia
7 Overseas Service Bars

Defense Distinguished Service Medal
Army Distinguished Service Medal with one bronze oak leaf cluster
Legion of Merit with three oak leaf clusters
Bronze Star Medal with one silver and one bronze oak leaf clusters
Defense Meritorious Service Medal
Meritorious Service Medal with four oak leaf clusters
Joint Service Commendation Medal
Army Commendation Medal with two oak leaf clusters
Joint Service Achievement Medal
Army Achievement Medal with two oak leaf clusters
Army Presidential Unit Citation
Joint Meritorious Unit Award with oak leaf cluster
Meritorious Unit Commendation with oak leaf cluster
National Defense Service Medal with one bronze service star
Armed Forces Expeditionary Medal
Afghanistan Campaign Medal with campaign star
Iraq Campaign Medal with silver campaign star
Global War on Terrorism Expeditionary Medal
Global War on Terrorism Service Medal
Korea Defense Service Medal
Humanitarian Service Medal
Army Service Ribbon
Army Overseas Service Ribbon with bronze award numeral 6
NATO Medal for Service with ISAF

Military offices
Preceded by Ryan F. Gonsalves	Deputy Commanding General (Maneuver) of the 4th Infantry Division; 2013–2014	Succeeded by Randy George
Preceded by Robert E. Choppa	Commandant of the United States Army Infantry School; 2014–2015	Succeeded by Peter Jones
Preceded by John M. Murray	Commanding General of the 3rd Infantry Division; 2015–2017	Succeeded by Leopoldo A. Quintas
Preceded by Paul E. Funk II	Assistant Deputy Chief of Staff for Operations, Plans, and Training of the United States Army; 2017–2018	Succeeded by Charles A. Flynn
Preceded by Robin Fontes	Commander of the Combined Security Transition Command – Afghanistan; 2018–2019	Succeeded by Edwin J. Deedrick
Preceded by Michael Lundy	Commanding General of the United States Army Combined Arms Center and Commandant of the United States Army Command and General Staff College; 2019–2021	Succeeded by Theodore D. Martin
Preceded by Charles A. Flynn	Deputy Chief of Staff for Operations, Plans, and Training of the United States Army; 2021–2022	Succeeded by Patrick E. Matlock
Preceded by James M. Richardson; Acting	Commanding General of United States Army Futures Command; 2022–2025	Position abolished
