= John K. Love =

American Marine Corps general

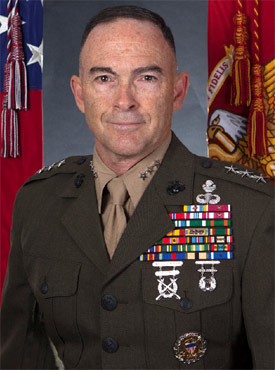
- Military career
- Allegiance: United States
- Branch: United States Marine Corps
- Service years: 1981–2021
- Rank: Lieutenant General
- Commands: 2nd Marine Division; 2nd Marine Expeditionary Brigade; 8th Marine Regimental Combat Team
- Conflicts: Iraq War; Operation Unified Protector
- Awards: Defense Superior Service Medal (2); Legion of Merit (2); Bronze Star Medal

John K. Love is a retired United States Marine lieutenant general who last served as senior United States military representative to the NATO in Brussels. He is the former commanding officer of the Second Marine Division which is based in the Marine Corps Base Camp Lejeune, in North Carolina.

== Military career ==
Love graduated from Texas Tech University. After, he was a corporal in the Marine Reserves and, in 1984, he was commissioned. He participated in Operation Iraqi Freedom in 2009. His assignments as a general officer included the time he participated in Operation Unified Protector in 2011 as part of NATO. Love was nominated for promotion to major general by the Secretary of Defense, Ash Carter, which was approved by the United States Senate in March 2015.

In June 2018, Love was nominated for promotion to lieutenant general and assignment as a military representative to the NATO Military Committee.

== Awards and decorations ==
Love was awarded the Legion of Merit for "exceptionally meritorious conduct in the performance of outstanding services to the Government of the United States".

Scuba Diver Insignia
Parachutist Badge
Rifle Expert Badge (7th award)
Pistol Expert Badge (several awards)
Joint Chiefs of Staff Identification Badge

Defense Superior Service Medal with one bronze oak leaf cluster
Legion of Merit with one gold award star
Bronze Star Medal
Defense Meritorious Service Medal
Meritorious Service Medal with award star
Joint Service Commendation Medal
Navy and Marine Corps Commendation Medal
Navy and Marine Corps Achievement Medal
Combat Action Ribbon
Joint Meritorious Unit Award with three oak leaf clusters
Navy Unit Commendation
Navy Meritorious Unit Commendation with two bronze service stars
National Defense Service Medal with service star
Armed Forces Expeditionary Medal
Iraq Campaign Medal with three service stars
Global War on Terrorism Service Medal
Korea Defense Service Medal
Armed Forces Service Medal
Navy Sea Service Deployment Ribbon with four service stars
Navy and Marine Corps Overseas Service Ribbon with service star
Marine Corps Recruiting Service Ribbon
Marine Corps Combat Instructor Ribbon
NATO Medal for the former Yugoslavia with service star

Military offices
Preceded by Brian Beaudreault	Commanding General of the 2nd Marine Division; 2016–2018	Succeeded by David J. Furness
Preceded by John N. Christenson	United States Military Representative to the NATO Military Committee; 2018–2021	Succeeded by E. John Deedrick
