= Robin Fontes =

United States Army major general

Robin L. Fontes
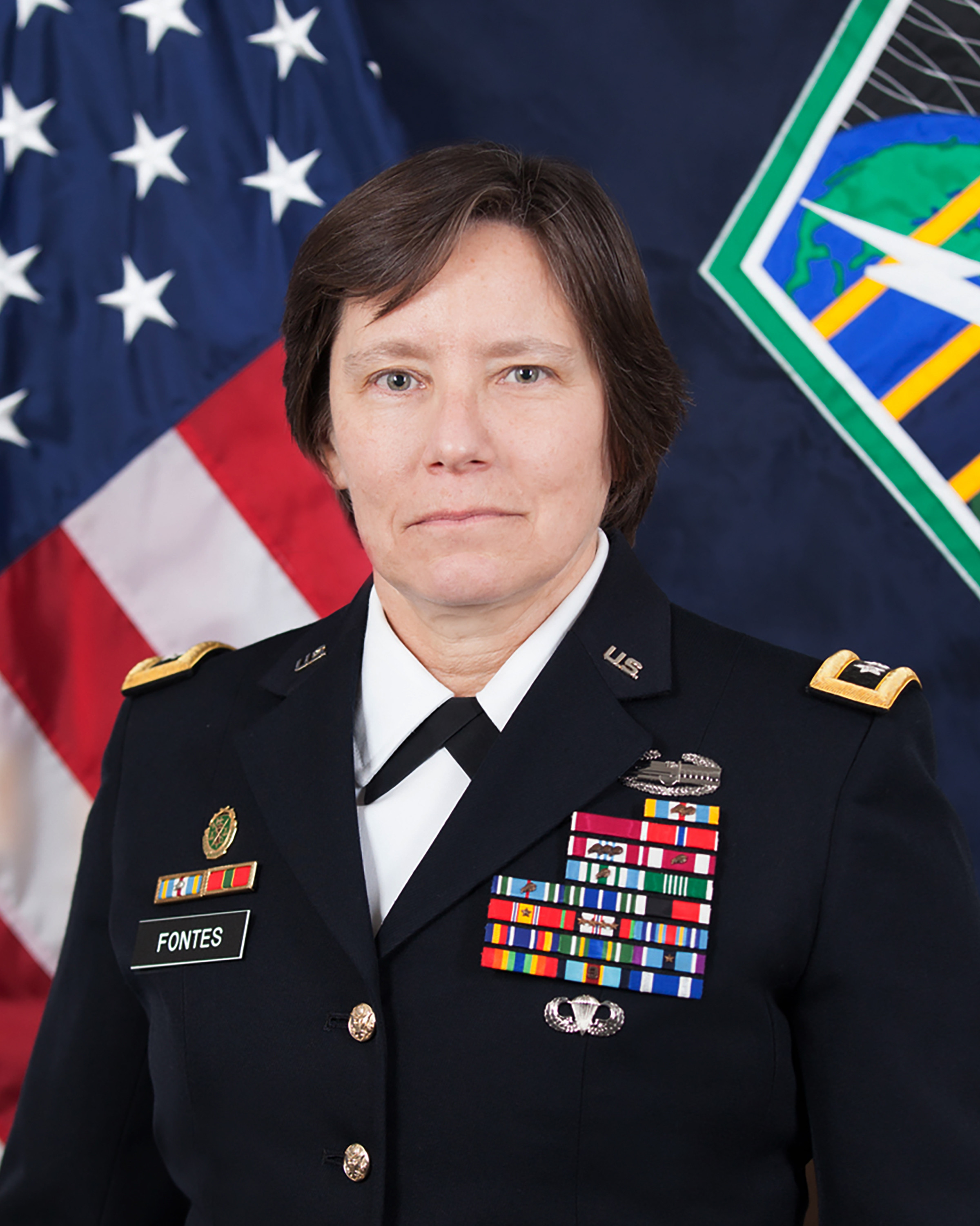
- Born: January 18, 1964 (age 62); Washington, U.S.
- Military career
- Allegiance: United States
- Branch: United States Army
- Service years: 1981–2020
- Rank: Major General
- Commands: Combined Security Transition Command – Afghanistan; Regional Command North
- Conflicts: War in Afghanistan
- Awards: Defense Superior Service Medal (3); Legion of Merit; Bronze Star Medal

Robin Louise Fontes (born January 18, 1964) is a retired United States Army major general who last served as deputy commanding general (operations) of the United States Army Cyber Command. In July 2017 she took command of Combined Security Transition Command – Afghanistan, becoming the highest-ranking female military officer in Afghanistan since the American invasion of that country in 2001. A mustang officer, Fontes was commissioned in 1986 and focused on Central Asia, eventually serving in Tajikistan, Pakistan, and India, including a few years in Afghanistan. She assumed her final position after the resignation of Michael Flynn from the Trump Administration ended her announced role as senior director for India, Pakistan and Central Asian Affairs on the United States National Security Council. In May 2022, Fontes joined Kronos Fusion Energy as a founding partner and board member in charge of International Expansion.

== Military career ==
=== Early career ===
Born in the state of Washington and raised in Kuna, Idaho, Fontes grew up in Treasure Valley and reports that she sought a military career ever since she was 12 years-old. Enlisting in the United States Army Reserve in 1981, she graduated from the United States Military Academy at West Point in 1986 and was commissioned a second lieutenant in the Military Police Corps. She served as a platoon leader in Germany, later returning to West Point to serve as a company commander. While a first lieutenant, she wrote two articles for Military Police, the official publication of her branch. The first article (in July 1988) was entitled "The 1987 BG Jeremiah P. Holland Award and the MP Company that Earned It." Her second (in June 1991) was called "MP Role in the Opening of the Berlin Wall." She was selected for the Foreign Area Officer program in 1993, resulting in her attendance at the Defense Language Institute, where she learned Russian. She also learned Dari and Persian. She would later also graduate from both the University of Washington (where she earned her master's degree in international studies) and the George C. Marshall European Center for Security Studies. In the late 1990s, Fontes served as a military liaison in Minsk. She spent a few years in Tajikistan serving first as a United States military representative and later as the United States Defense Attaché just as the Tajikistani Civil War was ending.

=== As a field grade officer ===
After the September 11 terrorist attacks in 2001, Fontes served at United States Central Command J5 overseeing issues of political-military cooperation in Afghanistan. In June 2004, she was moved to Combined Forces Command - Afghanistan headquarters in Kabul and served under David Barno as the head of the CJ5 staff for political-military coordination. Her staff was responsible for keeping General Barno "on message", overseeing the policies impacting military operations, and performing liaison work with both the Afghan Ministry of Defense and United Nations Assistance Mission in Afghanistan. At the end of her first year in Afghanistan and following Karl Eikenberry's assumption of command from Barno, Fontes volunteered to lead the Provincial Reconstruction Team (PRT) in Tarinkot. Daniel Green, the political adviser for the PRT, reported that though some Soldiers at the PRT had initial concerns due to her gender, those worries were shortly put to rest. She had been active in engaging with the Afghan people. Green said that Fontes, then a lieutenant colonel, pitched in a few hundred dollars of her own money to host a lunch on the PRT for local Afghan leaders. An article in Vanity Fair relates a story that she once refused to depart a meeting with Afghan elders in Chora District under threat of small arms fire, for fear of appearing weak in the face of the Taliban. Green asserts that in early 2006, she survived the first suicide vehicle-borne improvised explosive device attack in Urozgan Province due in part to the device's failure to detonate all of the mortar shells of which it was comprised. She departed Afghanistan in May 2006 to attend the US War College, graduating in 2007. She had been promoted that year to colonel. She was subsequently assigned as the chief of the American Security Assistance Office in Pakistan.

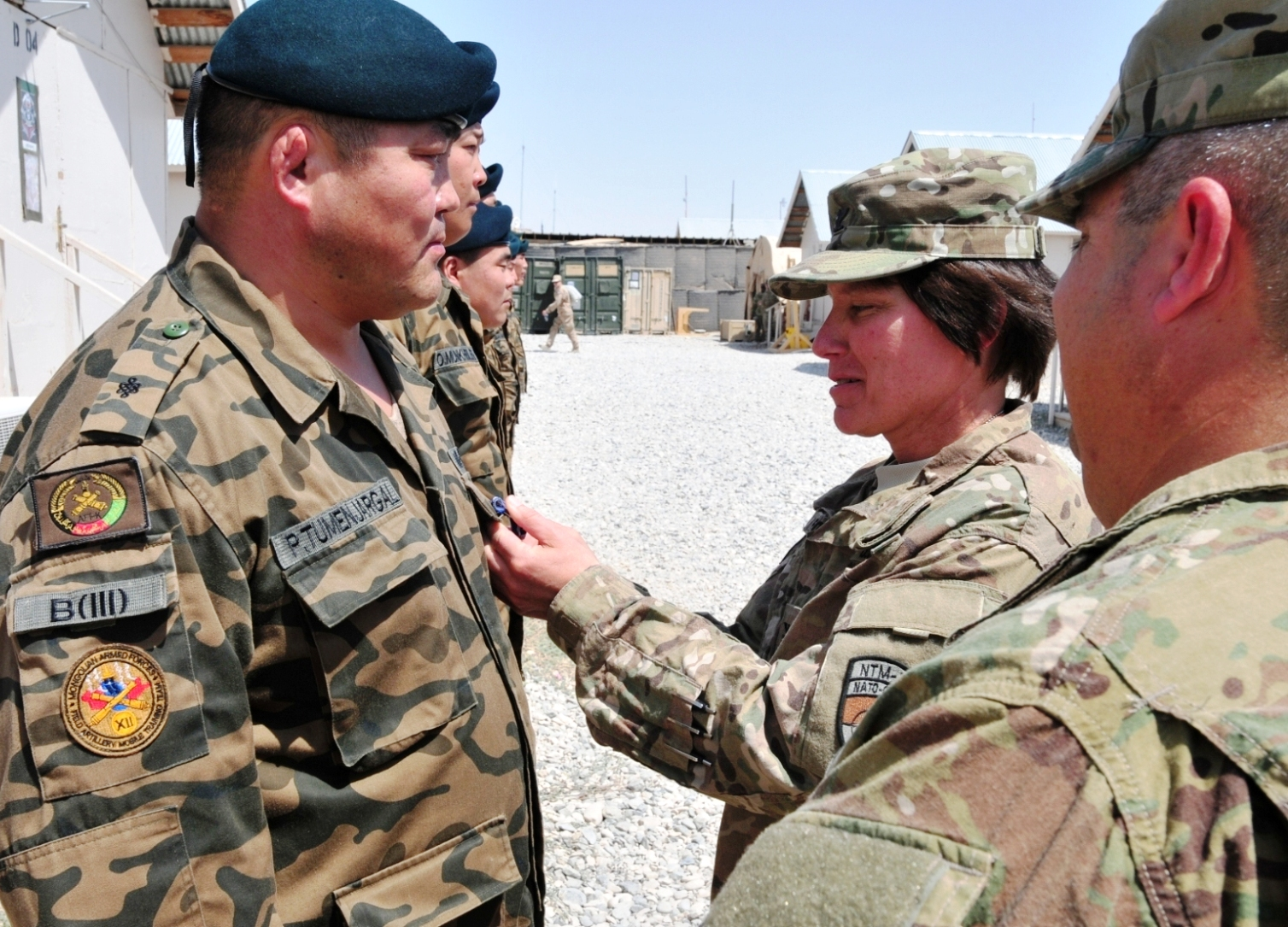
Fontes, while in command of Regional Command-North, awards a Mongolian General Purpose Force officer with the non-article 5 NATO medal for his service near Mazar-i-Sharif.

In July 2011, Fontes began a one-year tour at Mazar-i-Sharif in charge of Regional Command North, the NATO command of occupation forces in Northern Afghanistan. From 2012 to 2013, she was one of fifteen fellows at the Weatherhead Center for International Affairs.

=== Career as a general officer ===
The United States Senate approved Fontes's promotion to brigadier general in 2014. Following her 2014 graduation from the Defense Intelligence Agency's Joint Military Attaché School (where she was class leader), she was assigned as the United States Defense Attaché to India. She was the first American general officer sent to India since the 1960s. She was also the first woman to hold that position.

In February 2017, then-National Security Advisor Michael Flynn named Fontes, a colleague from his tenure as Director of the Defense Intelligence Agency, to be the next senior director for India, Pakistan and Central Asian Affairs at United States National Security Council (NSC). Anonymous sources within the Government of India told The Telegraph that they were hopeful Fontes's appointment in the White House would help convey New Delhi's concerns. Senior officials familiar with Fontes commented upon her understanding of India's security concerns vis-à-vis China and Pakistan; that she would be a friendly face among a Trump Administration cabinet mostly unknown to India. With Flynn's subsequent ouster, Fontes's assignment to the NSC was cancelled and the position was filled by Lisa Curtis (a former CIA analyst and fellow at The Heritage Foundation) at the behest of Flynn's replacement, H. R. McMaster.

In July 2017, Fontes took command of Combined Security Transition Command – Afghanistan, replacing Richard Kaiser. Concurrently, she also served as a deputy chief of staff in charge of security assistance for the Resolute Support Mission. Fontes was the highest-ranking female military officer in Afghanistan during the American occupation of that country. Asked in November 2017 about her assignment, Fontes replied to Stars and Stripes that she hoped the public would judge her performance as an Army officer regardless of her gender. Despite the flood of negative comments Stars and Stripes reported they received in response to her appointment to CSTC-A, Fontes stated that she was not surprised. She said "if I worried about that, I wouldn't have time to do anything else."

As of June 8, 2019 Fontes served as senior defense official and defense attaché, United States Defense Attaché Office, India. On June 9, 2019, Fontes was named as senior defense official and defense attaché, United States Defense Attaché Office, Egypt. In December 2019, her next assignment was instead changed to Deputy Commanding General for Operations, United States Army Cyber Command.

Fontes is a founding lifetime member of the Foreign Area Officer Association. She retired to Lowman, Idaho at the end of her military career.

== Footnotes ==
Military offices
Preceded by Richard G. Kaiser	Commander of the Combined Security Transition Command – Afghanistan; 2018–2018	Succeeded by James Rainey
Preceded by Jeth B. Rey	Deputy Commanding General for Operations of the United States Army Cyber Command; 2019–2020	Succeeded by Paul T. Stanton
