= Charles A. Flynn =

United States Army general

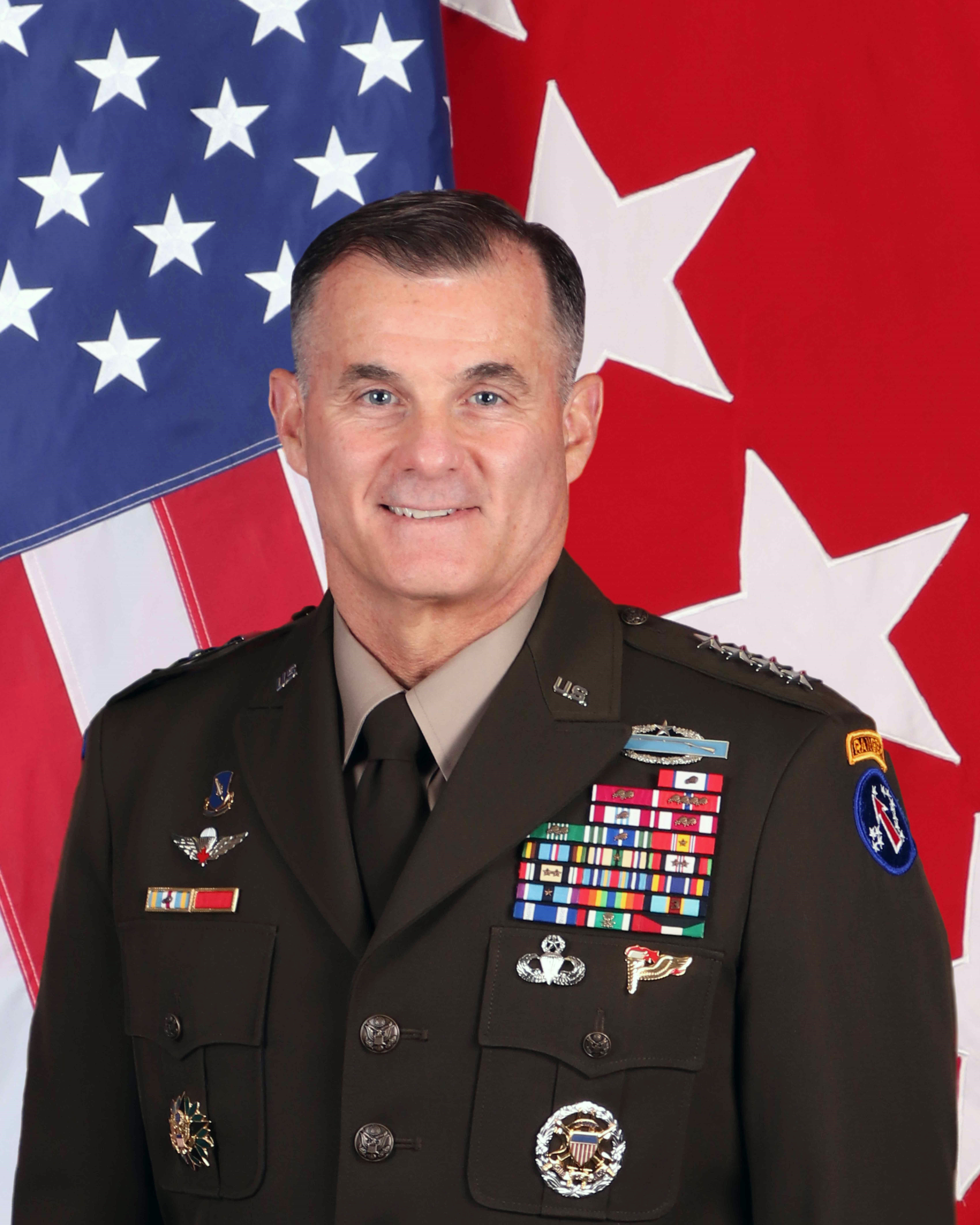
- Official portrait, 2021
- Born: c. 1963 (age 62–63); Middletown, Rhode Island, U.S.
- Relatives: LTG Michael T. Flynn (brother)
- Military career
- Allegiance: United States
- Branch: United States Army
- Service years: 1985–2024
- Rank: General
- Commands: United States Army Pacific; 25th Infantry Division; 1st Brigade Combat Team, 82nd Airborne Division; 2nd Battalion, 504th Parachute Infantry Regiment
- Conflicts: Gulf War; War in Afghanistan; Iraq War
- Awards: Army Distinguished Service Medal (2); Legion of Merit (3); Bronze Star Medal (5); Honorary Officer of the Order of Australia

Charles A. Flynn (born c. 1963) is a retired United States Army general who last served as the commanding general of United States Army Pacific from 2021 to 2024. He previously served as Deputy Chief of Staff for Operations, Plans and Training (G3/5/7) of the Army Staff from 2019 to 2021. He is the younger brother of Lieutenant General Michael T. Flynn, Donald Trump's first National Security Advisor.

== Background ==
Flynn was raised in Middletown, Rhode Island, and graduated from Middletown High School in 1981. Flynn received his commission via the Army Reserve Officers' Training Corps at the University of Rhode Island in 1985. He earned a Bachelor of Science in Marketing from the University of Rhode Island in 1985.

== Military career ==
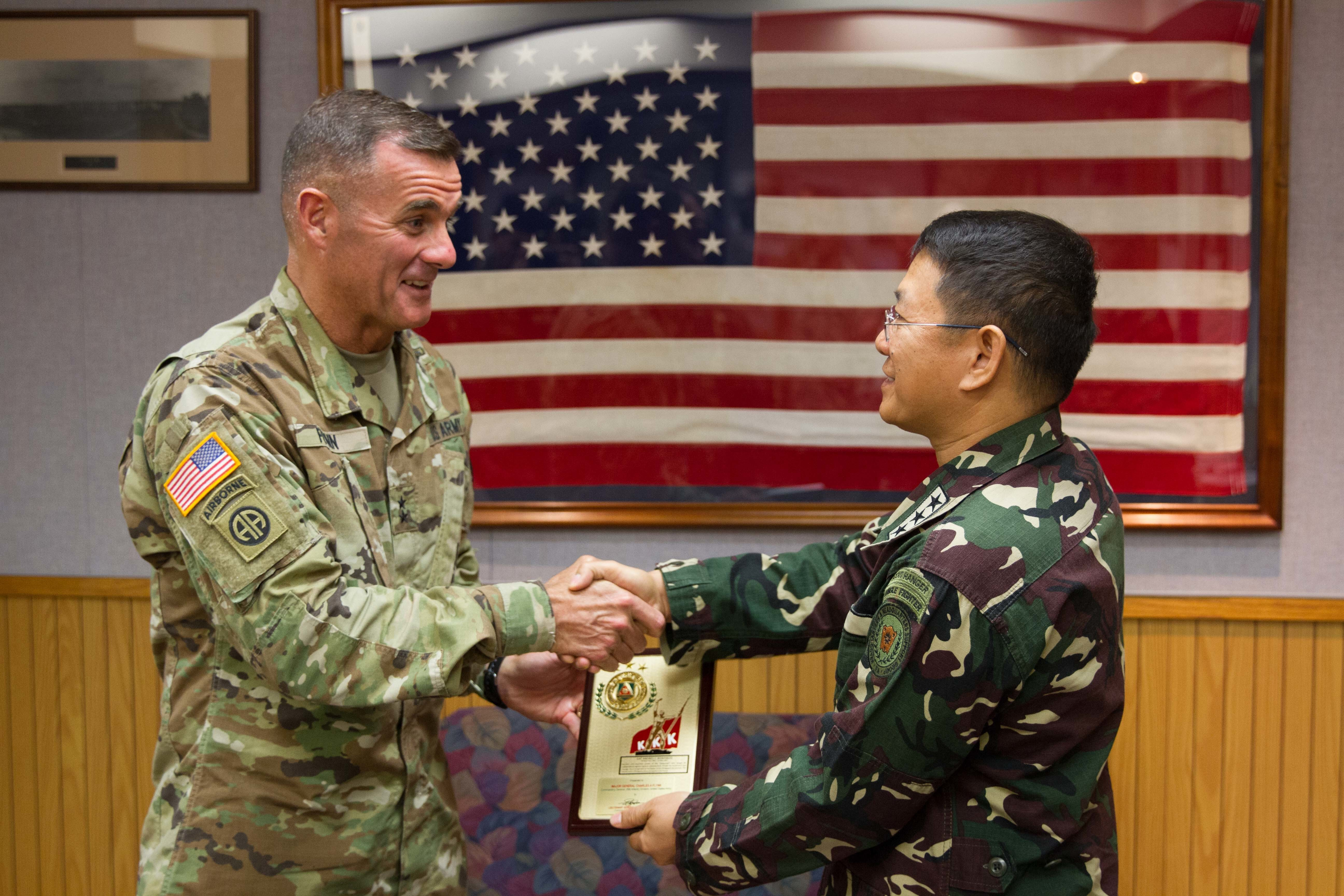
Flynn, as commander of the 25th Infantry Division, hosts the commanding general of the Philippine Army, Lt. Gen. Eduardo Año on 20 October 2015.

Flynn received a Master of Arts in National Security and Strategic Studies from the Naval War College in 1997 and a Master of Science in Joint Campaign Planning and Strategy from the Joint Advanced Warfighting School within the Joint Forces Staff College of National Defense University.

At the start of his career, Flynn became qualified as an Infantry officer. In addition, he completed the Ranger, Airborne, and Pathfinder courses. His early assignments included: commander of A Company, 4th Battalion, 325th Infantry Regiment and commander of A Company 2nd Battalion, 75th Ranger Regiment. He also served as operations officer (S-3) of 1st Battalion, 27th Infantry Regiment and 2nd Brigade Combat Team, 25th Infantry Division.

Flynn subsequently commanded 2nd Battalion, 504th Infantry Regiment, which included deployment for Operation Enduring Freedom and Operation Iraqi Freedom. He deployed to Iraq again as commander of 1st Brigade Combat Team, 82nd Airborne Division. He later served as executive assistant to the Director of the Joint Staff and executive officer for the commander of International Security Assistance Force, United States Forces – Afghanistan. Flynn went on to serve as director of the Mission Command Center of Excellence (MCCOE) and acting commander of the United States Army Combined Arms Center.

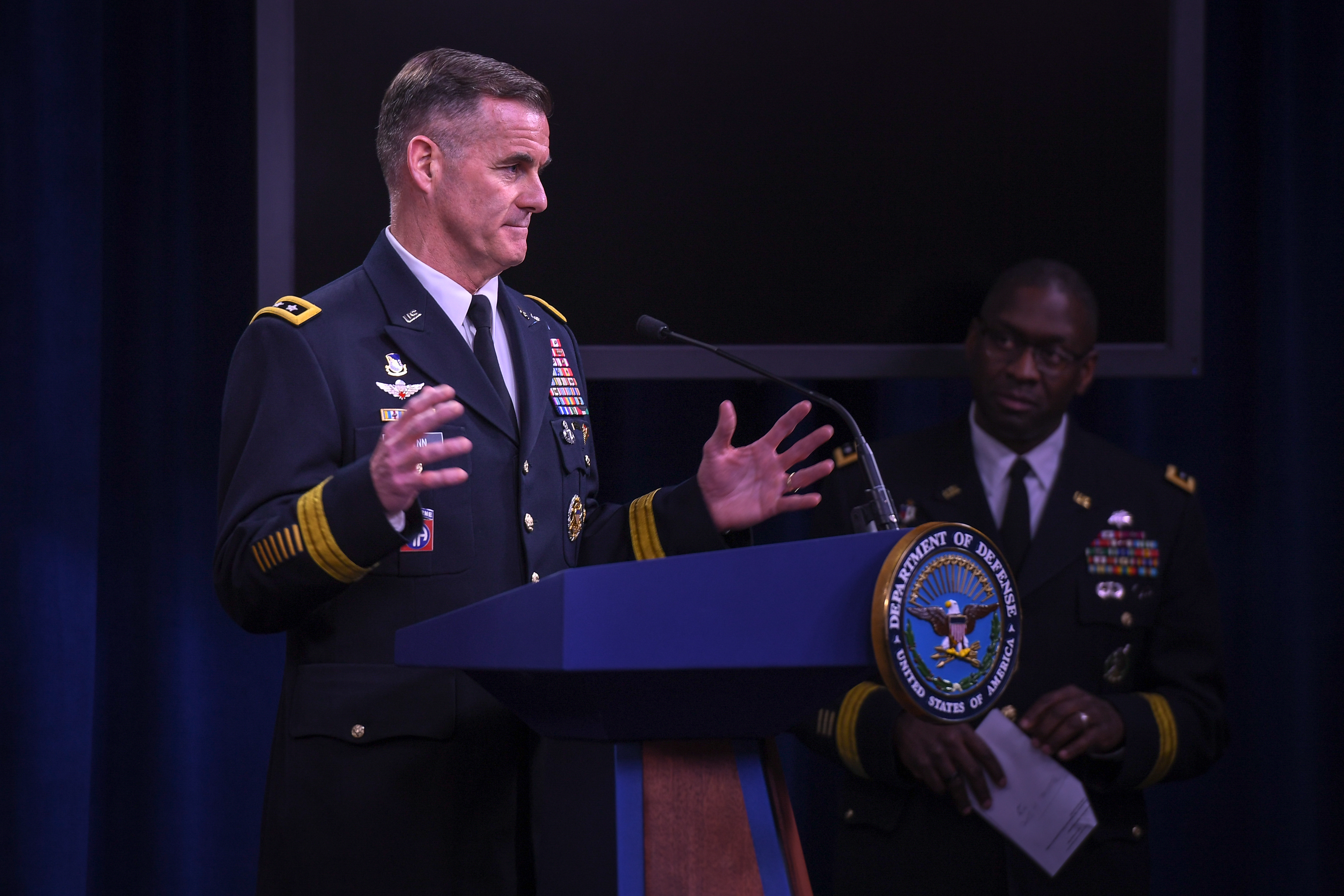
Lt. Gen. Flynn at a COVID-19 press briefing at the Pentagon, 20 March 2020

As Flynn advanced through the general officer ranks, he served as the 82nd Airborne Division's deputy commander for operations and assistant operations officer for readiness (G-3/5/7) for United States Army Forces Command. He commanded the 25th Infantry Division from 2014 to 2016, then was assigned as deputy commander of United States Army Pacific. He next served as assistant deputy chief of staff for operations (G-3/5/7) at Headquarters Department of the Army. In June 2019, Flynn was assigned as deputy chief of staff for operations (G3/5/7).

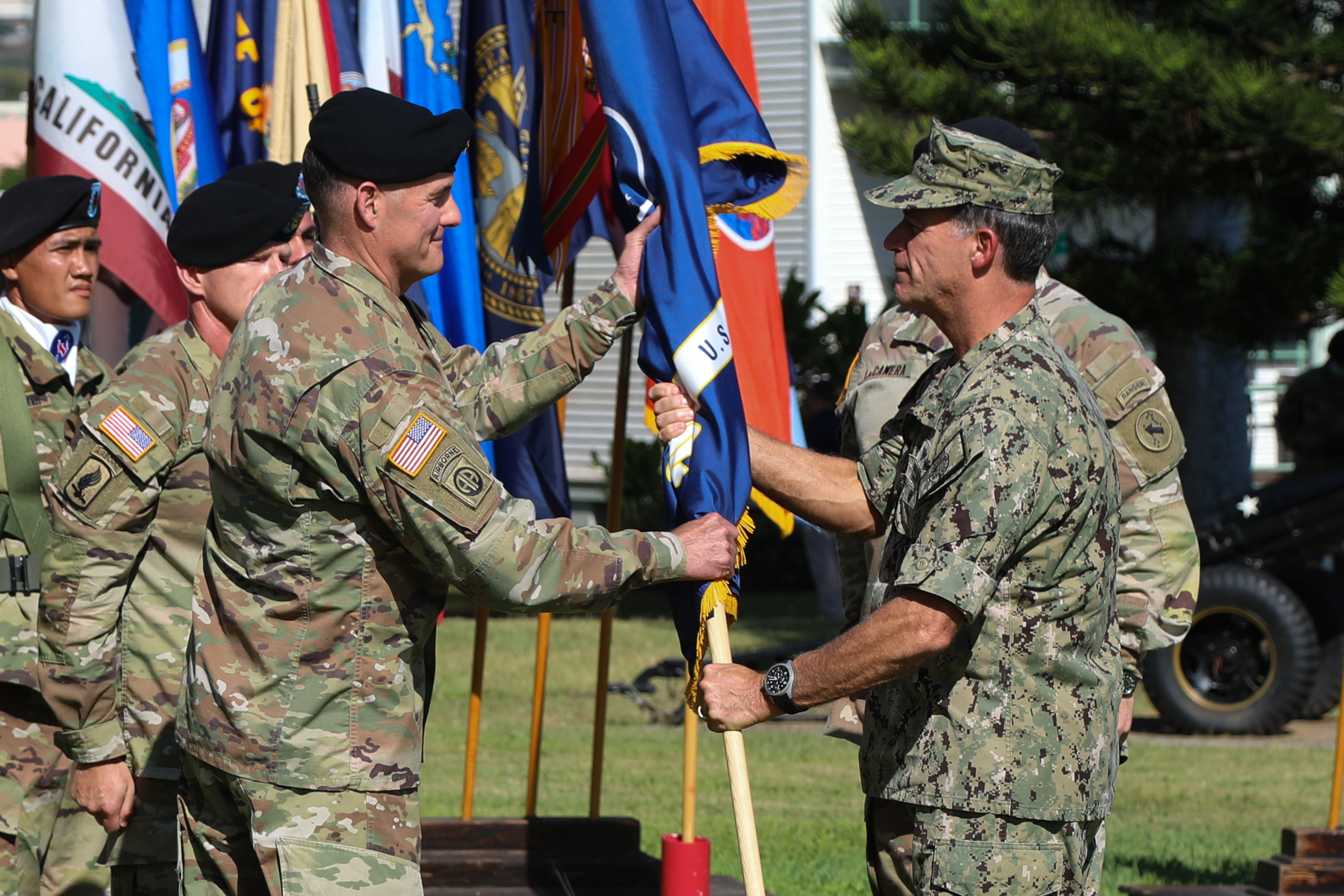
Newly promoted General Flynn receives the command colors of USARPAC from Admiral John C. Aquilino as he assumes command on 4 June 2021.

On 30 November 2020, his nomination for promotion to general was submitted to the U.S. Senate and was confirmed by voice vote of the full Senate on 20 December 2020. On 25 January 2021, the Department of Defense named Flynn as the next commander of the United States Army Pacific at Fort Shafter in Honolulu. He assumed that command in a change of command ceremony at Fort Shafter, Hawaii on 4 June 2021.

Flynn retired in 2024. In June 2024, Flynn was appointed an honorary Officer of the Order of Australia, for distinguished service in fostering and deepening the military relationship between Australia and the United States of America.

== U.S. Capitol attack ==
During the 2021 storming of the United States Capitol, a conference call took place between Capitol police, D.C. officials, and Pentagon officials. In that call, the Chief of the Capitol police made "an urgent, urgent immediate request for National Guard assistance", telling them he needed "boots on the ground". However, Lieutenant General Walter E. Piatt, Director of the Army Staff, said he could not recommend the request be approved. Initially denying his involvement, the Army later confirmed that Flynn had participated in the phone call, although it claimed he cannot remember if he said anything on the critical call about deploying National Guard, but others on the call reported hearing his voice. In early December 2021, Colonel Earl G. Matthews released a memo that accused Flynn of making willful distortions of the events of 6 January, describing Flynn and Piatt as "absolute and unmitigated liars" and of giving “perjured testimony before Congress”. Charles Flynn's role drew scrutiny in light of his brother Michael's recent calls for martial law and a redo election overseen by the military.

== Awards and decorations ==
Right Breast

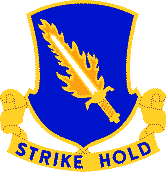
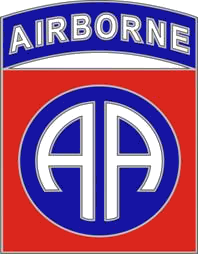

504th Infantry Regiment Combat Service Identification Badge
Canadian Jump Wings
Joint Meritorious Unit; Award with oak leaf cluster	Army Meritorious Unit; Commendation
82nd Airborne Division Combat Service Identification Badge

Left Breast

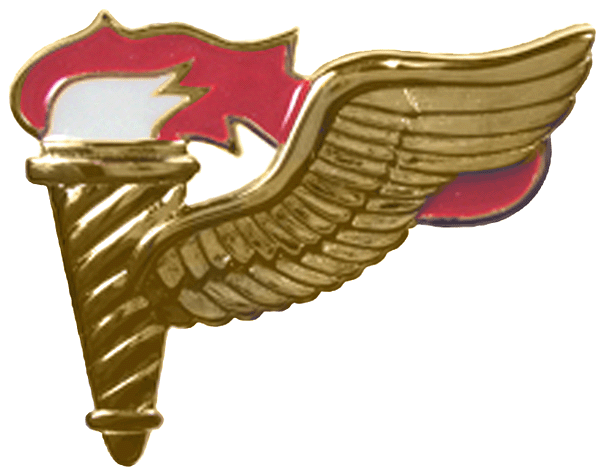

Badge	Combat Infantryman Badge (2nd Award)		
1st row	Army Distinguished Service Medal with oak leaf cluster		Legion of Merit with two oak leaf clusters
2nd row	Bronze Star Medal with four oak leaf clusters	Defense Meritorious Service Medal with oak leaf cluster	Meritorious Service Medal with two oak leaf clusters
3rd row	Army Commendation Medal with two oak leaf clusters	Army Achievement Medal with oak leaf cluster	National Defense Service Medal with service star
4th row	Armed Forces Expeditionary Medal	Southwest Asia Service Medal with service star	Afghanistan Campaign Medal with two campaign star
5th row	Iraq Campaign Medal with two campaign stars	Global War on Terrorism Expeditionary Medal	Global War on Terrorism Service Medal
6th row	Humanitarian Service Medal with service star	Army Service Ribbon	Army Overseas Service Ribbon with award numeral 3
7th row	NATO Medal for service with ISAF	Kuwait Liberation Medal (Saudi Arabia)	Kuwait Liberation Medal (Kuwait)
Badges	Master Parachutist Badge	Ranger Tab	Pathfinder Badge
Badges	Joint Chiefs of Staff Identification Badge		United States Army Staff Identification Badge

Other awards

Expert Infantryman Badge
Overseas Service Bar (x7)

Military offices
Preceded by Timothy McGuire	Deputy Commanding General for Operations of the 82nd Airborne Division; 2012–2013	Succeeded by Christopher G. Cavoli
Preceded by ???	Assistant Deputy Chief of Staff for Readiness of the United States Army Forces Command; 2013–2014	Succeeded by William E. King IV
Preceded by W. Kurt Fuller	Commander of the 25th Infantry Division; 2014–2016	Succeeded by Christopher G. Cavoli
Preceded by Todd B. McCaffrey	Deputy Commanding General (South) of the United States Army Pacific; 2016–2018	Succeeded by Jonathan P. Braga
Preceded by James Rainey	Assistant Deputy Chief of Staff for Operations, Plans, and Training of the United States Army; 2018–2019	Succeeded by Paul T. Calvert
Preceded by Joseph Anderson	Deputy Chief of Staff for Operations, Plans, and Training of the United States Army; 2019–2021	Succeeded by James Rainey
Preceded by Paul LaCamera	Commanding General of United States Army Pacific; 2021–2024	Succeeded by Ronald P. Clark
