= E. John Deedrick =

U.S. Army general

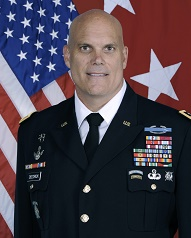
- Born: 27 May 1960 (age 66); Columbus, Georgia, U.S.
- Relatives: Divorced
- Military career
- Allegiance: United States
- Branch: United States Army
- Service years: 1988–2023
- Rank: Lieutenant General
- Nickname: J
- Commands: Combined Security Transition Command – Afghanistan; 1st Special Forces Command (Airborne); Special Operations Command Korea; 10th Special Forces Group; 3rd Battalion, 1st Special Forces Group
- Awards: Defense Superior Service Medal (2); Legion of Merit (2); Bronze Star Medal (2)
- Other work: Founder and CEO of E. John Deedrick Jr. and Associates LLC Global Special Operations Foundation Board of Advisors Jan 2024 - Present Special Operations Warrior Foundation Ambassador Sep 2023 - Present

Edwin John Deedrick Jr. is a retired United States Army lieutenant general who last served as the United States military representative to the NATO Military Committee from August 24, 2021, to May 2023. He most recently served as the Commander of the Combined Security Transition Command – Afghanistan. Previously, he served as the Commanding General of the 1st Special Forces Command (Airborne). He received his commission in 1988 through the Reserve Officers Training Corps program at The Citadel in 1988. He is currently on a Special Assignment in the Middle East

Military offices
Preceded by Eric P. Wendt	Commander of the Special Operations Command Korea; 2014–2016	Succeeded by Tony D. Bauernfeind
Preceded by Francis M. Beaudette	Assistant Commander for Support of the Joint Special Operations Command; 2017–2018	Succeeded by ???
Preceded by Francis M. Beaudette	Commanding General of the 1st Special Forces Command (Airborne); 2018–2019	Succeeded by John W. Brennan
Preceded by James Rainey	Commander of the Combined Security Transition Command – Afghanistan; 2019–2021	Command inactivated
Preceded by John K. Love	United States Military Representative to the NATO Military Committee; 2021–2023	Vacant Title next held by Shoshana Chatfield
