= USS Sampson (DDG-10) =

Charles F. Adams-class destroyer

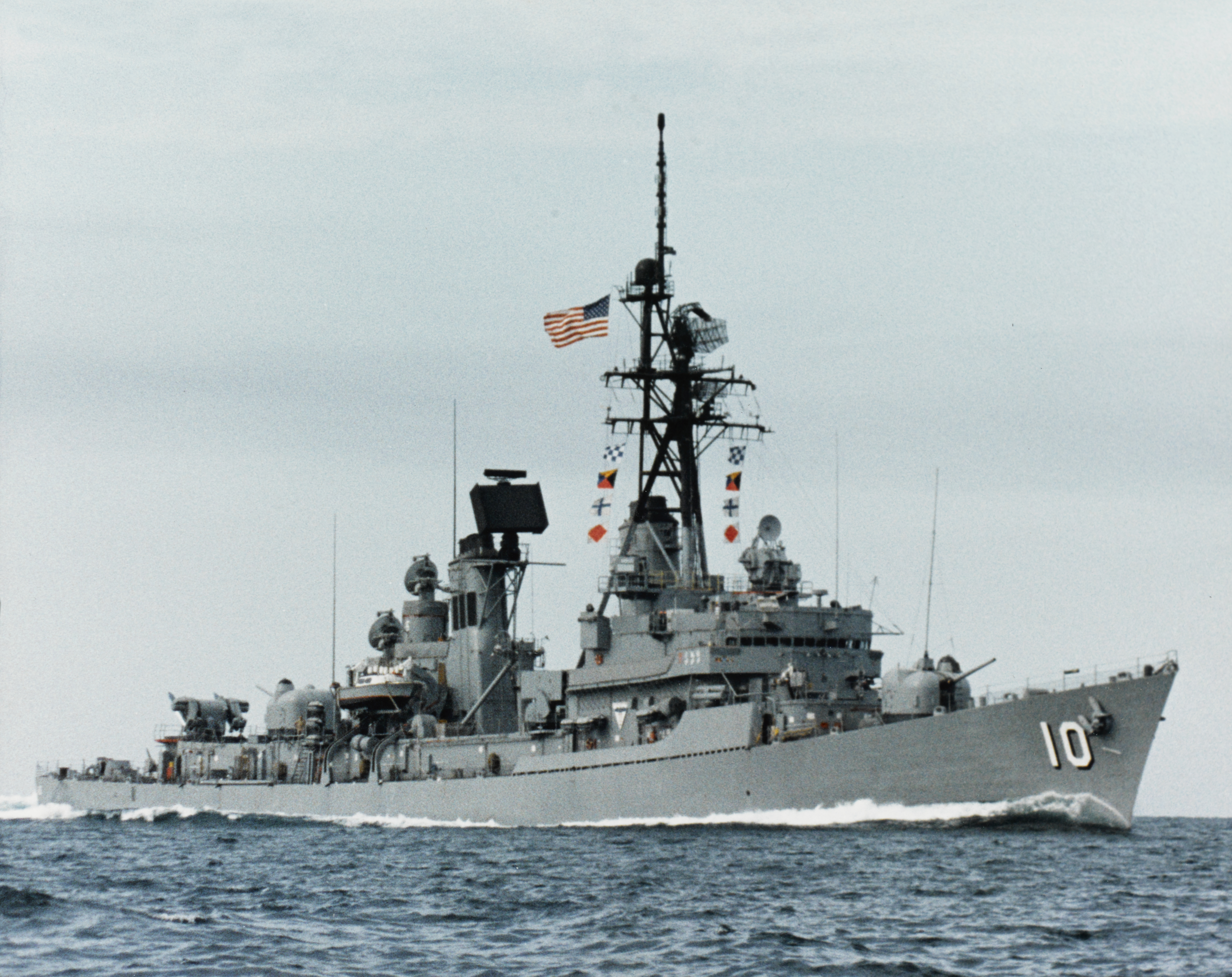
- USS Sampson underway in late-1980s

History

United States
- Name: Sampson
- Namesake: William T. Sampson
- Ordered: 17 January 1958
- Builder: Bath Iron Works
- Laid down: 2 March 1959
- Launched: 21 May 1960
- Acquired: 16 June 1961
- Commissioned: 24 June 1961
- Decommissioned: 24 June 1991
- Stricken: 20 November 1992
- Identification: Callsign: NZXF; Hull number: DDG-10
- Motto: Latin: Fortes Fortuna Juvat; (Fortune Favors the Brave)
- Fate: Scrapped, 15 October 2003

General characteristics
- Class & type: Charles F. Adams-class destroyer
- Displacement: 3,277 tons standard, 4,526 full load
- Length: 437 ft (133 m)
- Beam: 47 ft (14 m)
- Draft: 15 ft (4.6 m)
- Propulsion: 2 × General Electric steam turbines providing 70,000 shp (52 MW); 2 shafts; 4 × Babcock & Wilcox 1,275 psi (8,790 kPa) boilers
- Speed: 33 knots (61 km/h; 38 mph)
- Range: 4,500 nautical miles (8,300 km) at 20 knots (37 km/h)
- Complement: 354 (24 officers, 330 enlisted)
- Sensors & processing systems: AN/SPS-39 3D air search radar; AN/SPS-10 surface search radar; AN/SPG-51 missile fire control radar; AN/SPG-53 gunfire control radar; AN/SQS-23 Sonar and the hull mounted SQQ-23 Pair Sonar for DDG-2 through 19; AN/SPS-40 Air Search Radar
- Armament: 1 Mk 11 missile launcher (DDG2-14) or Mk 13 single arm missile launcher (DDG-15-24) for RIM-24 Tartar SAM system, or later the RIM-66 Standard (SM-1) and Harpoon antiship missile; 2 × 5"/54 caliber Mark 42 (127 mm) gun; 1 × RUR-5 ASROC Launcher; 6 × 12.8 in (324 mm) ASW Torpedo Tubes (2 × Mark 32 Surface Vessel Torpedo Tubes)

USS Sampson (DDG-10), named for Admiral William T. Sampson USN (1840–1902), was a Charles F. Adams-class guided missile destroyer in the United States Navy.

== Construction and career ==
Sampson was laid down by the Bath Iron Works at Bath in Maine on 2 March 1959, launched on 21 May 1960 by Mrs. John S. Crenshaw and commissioned on 24 June 1961 at the Boston Navy Yard.

=== 1960s ===
Following shakedown off Guantanamo Bay in September, Sampson tested and evaluated the Tartar missile system off Puerto Rico. Homeported at Norfolk, Virginia, she conducted further tests and trials in early 1962 before joining Destroyer Squadron 18 (DesRon 18) and Destroyer Division 182 (DesDiv 182) in July. Composed completely of missile ships, DesRon 18 was then the most modern squadron in the Navy. Further radar and missile tests followed in 1963; and, in July, Sampson operated in the Midshipman Training Squadron. Finally, in January 1964, Sampson fired two Tartar missiles under simulated combat conditions. During 1964, she also underwent her first regular overhaul, and received missile replenishment at sea from helicopters.

In January 1965, Sampson sailed for her first Mediterranean deployment, but an electrical fire on the night of 14 January caused extensive damage to her fire control capability and forced her to abbreviate her deployment and enter the Norfolk Naval Shipyard for repairs on 15 March.

The destroyer returned to fleet duties on 24 June. While conducting gunnery exercises, on 17 July, Sampson spotted the 50-foot sailing sloop, Cecelia Anna, flying distress signals and rescued her 6 crewmen and mascot puppy moments before the sloop sank. In 1966, Sampson conducted gunnery exercises and escort duties near Guantánamo Bay, Cuba; then, in March, she deployed to the Mediterranean for extensive operations with the 6th Fleet. She returned to Norfolk in August. On 28 November, following three weeks of exercises in the Caribbean and additional tests, Sampson got underway to participate in exercise "Lantflex 66" in which she provided ASW and AAW services for the ASW carrier, Wasp, and conducted exercises in the Puerto Rico operating area before returning to Norfolk in December.

Sampson re-deployed to the Mediterranean in mid-1967. While there, a Sampson radarman rescued a German seaman from the harbor at Ferrol, Spain. <Sampson visited Rota and El Ferrol, Spain from 10 May to 18 May 1967.

By 25 May 1967, there was evidence that a crisis was brewing in the Middle East that eventually lead up to the Six-Day War, 5-10 Jun 1967. The Sampson was assigned to the USS America CVA-66 task group. This task group also joined up with TG 60.2, the carrier Saratoga CVA-60, and her destroyers under the command of Rear Admiral Geis.

On 8 June 1967, the USS Liberty (AGTR-5) was attacked by Israeli fighter jets aircraft and Israeli Navy motor torpedo boats. The attack killed 34 crew members and wounded 171 crew members. Sampson was a member of the force which steamed to rendezvous with the heavily damaged USS Liberty (AGTR-5) on 9 June. Sampson was in Souda Bay, Crete 13-18 June 1967.

Leaving the 6th Fleet at the end of August 1967, Sampson steamed back to the United States, and soon shifted to her new home port of Charleston, South Carolina.

Sampson operated out of Charleston in the Atlantic and Caribbean during 1968 until again deploying to the Mediterranean in September. She returned to Charleston in February 1969 and resumed operations in the Atlantic and the Caribbean until redeploying to the Mediterranean in October of that year. After six months with the 6th Fleet, she returned to Charleston on 28 March 1970.

=== 1970s ===
Sampson operated out of Charleston in the western Atlantic until 23 September, when, after only two days' notice, she got underway for special operations in the Mediterranean. She spent the month of October cruising first with USS John F. Kennedy, then with Saratoga, during the latest Levantine crisis. On 1 November, she stood out of Barcelona, Spain, to return to the United States. Sampson entered the mouth of the Cooper River on the 12th, moored at Charleston, and began a leave and upkeep period.

Sampson stayed in Charleston into 1971. During the first three months of the new year, she operated in the vicinity of the British West Indies; then prepared for overseas movement. On 9 April, following exercises and type training, Sampson steamed out of Charleston, passed Fort Sumter, and headed for the Mediterranean. She cruised with the 6th Fleet for six months, participating in exercises with both American and NATO forces. By 16 October, the guided missile destroyer was back in port at Charleston. She spent the rest of 1971 preparing for regular overhaul.

For four months, from 4 January until 4 May 1972, Sampson underwent the first Compressed Regular Overhaul ever attempted on a DDG. From mid-May until 9 July, she was underway for post-overhaul trials, exercises, and refresher training. She was in Charleston during the period 9 July to 18 August, at which time Sampson stood out for her new home port, Athens, Greece. She stopped at Rota, Spain, ten days later and entered Phaleron Bay on 3 October. The guided missile destroyer remained in the Mediterranean, home ported at Athens, Greece throughout 1973 and into 1974. In April 1974, she was in port at Athens.

In 1973 she was dispatched to and docked in Tunis, Tunisia where she provided communication link for Helos of USS Forrestal for the Medjerda River flood. During 1973 she visited Barcelona, Spain, Palma de Majorca, Naples Italy, Mikonos, Crete, Istanbul, Turkey, and Villa France. She met the Soviet Black Seas fleet at the straits of Bosporus during the 1973 Israeli/Arab war.

=== 1980s ===
Sampson underwent a major overhaul in the Portsmouth shipyard during 1980–81. In November 1982 Sampson deployed to the Persian Gulf and later the Mediterranean. After transiting the Suez canal and Red Sea, the Sampson shadowed the Soviet carrier Minsk & cruiser Tashkent in the Indian Ocean, and made port calls in Djibouti, and in Karachi. Sampson was on station off Beirut when the US Embassy was bombed. The ship returned to Mayport, FL in May 1983. From October to December of that year, Sampson was deployed in the eastern Caribbean in support of Operation Urgent Fury.

=== 1990s ===
On 7 August 1990 the Sampson deployed with the USS Saratoga battle group in support of Desert Shield/Storm. Once there the Sampson performed the final Adams class guided missile destroyer deployment as a unit of the Maritime Interception Force, conducting the first boarding and search of a merchant on 28 AUG 1990, during OPERATION DESERT SHIELD and the first diversion of a ship with prohibited cargo. After conducting the first-ever exercise ASROC shot in the Red Sea, USS SAMPSON operated with ships of various NATO navies conducting surveillance and protection of shipping in the approaches to the Suez Canal.

=== Decommissioning ===
Sampson was decommissioned on 24 June 1991 exactly 30 years after commissioning, stricken from the Naval Vessel Register on 20 November 1992 and sold for scrap on 25 July 1995. Sampson was repossessed by the US Navy on 14 March 2000 after the scrap yard failed to dismantle the ship in a timely manner. On 10 February 2003, the Navy issued a contract to Metro Machine of Philadelphia, Pa to dismantle Sampson for $2,900,000. Sampson was completely dismantled on 15 October 2003.
