= Daniel P. Bolger =

United States Army general

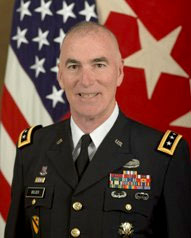
- Born: January 15, 1957 (age 69); Aurora, Illinois
- Military career
- Allegiance: United States
- Branch: United States Army
- Service years: 1978–2013
- Rank: Lieutenant General
- Commands: Combined Security Transition Command - Afghanistan; 1st Cavalry Division; Joint Readiness Training Center; 2d Brigade, 2d Infantry Division
- Conflicts: Iraq War; War in Afghanistan
- Awards: Defense Superior Service Medal; Legion of Merit (4); Bronze Star Medal (5)

Daniel P. Bolger is an American author, historian, and retired a lieutenant general of the United States Army. He held a special faculty appointment in the Department of History at North Carolina State University, where he taught military history until 2023. At that time, he transitioned to an adjunct role.

Bolger retired from the army in 2013. During his 35 years of service, he earned five Bronze Star Medals (one for valor) and the Combat Action Badge. His notable military commands included serving as Commanding General of the Combined Security Transition Command in Afghanistan and Commander of the NATO Training Mission in Afghanistan (2011–2013); Commanding General of the 1st Cavalry Division at Fort Hood, Texas (deployed to Baghdad, 2009–2010); the Coalition Military Assistance Training Team in Iraq (2005–06); and U.S. Army Assistant Chief of Staff for Operations. He is also the author of books, such as Why We Lost, Americans at War, The Battle for Hunger Hill, Death Ground, and The Panzer Killers.

== Military career ==
Bolger graduated from The Citadel, The Military College of South Carolina in 1978. Upon graduation he was commissioned an Infantry officer in the United States Army. His initial assignment was to C Company, 2nd Battalion, 34th Infantry Regiment, 24th Infantry Division. He served as a weapons platoon leader, Executive Officer of B Company and later on as B Rifle company commander. Bolger served as an Instructor and assistant professor in the Department of History of the United States Military Academy from 1986 to 1989, he subsequently was assigned as the S-3 (Operations Officer) of the 1st Battalion (Mechanized), 5th Infantry, 2nd Infantry Division in Korea. Later on he served as the Assistant G-3 (Operations) of the 101st Airborne Division at Fort Campbell, Kentucky. In 1994 Bolger commanded the 1st Battalion, 327th Infantry, 101st Airborne Division, and afterwards served as the G-3 (Operations) of the 101st Airborne Division. In 1998 he commanded the 2nd Brigade, 2nd Infantry Division in Korea. Afterwards he served at the U.S. Joint Forces Command in Norfolk, Virginia. In 2002 Bolger served as the Chief of Staff of the 2nd Infantry Division, and later on as the Assistant Division Commander (Support) of the 101st Airborne Division. In 2005 Bolger served as the deputy commander of the Multi-National Corps-Iraq, and later on as the Commander of the Coalition Military Assistance Training Team. In 2006 he commanded the Joint Readiness Training Center at Fort Polk, and afterwards he served as the commander of 1st Cavalry Division in Iraq. In 2010 he was appointed as the Deputy Chief of Staff, G-3/5/7, U.S. Army. In 2011 he was appointed as the commander of the combined Security Transition Command in Afghanistan as the Commander of NATO's Training Mission there. He retired from the Army in 2013.

== Education ==
- Bachelor of Arts in history, The Citadel in Charleston, South Carolina
- M.A. in Russian History and Ph.D. in Military History from the University of Chicago. see from the University of Chicago in Chicago, Illinois
- Graduate of the U.S. Army Command & General Staff College at Fort Leavenworth, Kansas
- Graduate, U.S. Army War College at Carlisle Barracks, Pennsylvania, 1998

== Awards and decorations ==
During his military service he was awarded: Defense Superior Service Medal, four awards of the Legion of Merit, the Bronze Star Medal for Valor, three awards of the Bronze Star, four awards of the Meritorious Service Medal, three awards of the Army Commendation Medal, and two awards of the Army Achievement Medal. He has also earned the Joint Chiefs of Staff Identification Badge and the Army Staff Identification Badge. He has also earned the Combat Action Badge, the Parachutist Badge and the Air Assault Badge. He was awarded the Centurion Level of the Order of Saint Maurice in 2000.

== Bibliography ==
- Why We Lost: A General's Inside Account of the Iraq and Afghanistan Wars (ISBN 978-0544370487). Reviewed by Carter Malkasian at
- Dragons at War: Land Battles in the Desert (ISBN 978-0804108997)
- Americans at War 1975–1986: An Era of Violent Peace (ISBN 978-0517071915)
- Savage Peace: Americans at War in the 1990s (ISBN 978-0891414520)
- The Battle for Hunger Hill: The 1st Battalion, 327th Infantry Regiment at the Joint Readiness Training Center (ISBN 978-0891414537)
- Feast of Bones (ISBN 978-0804108348)
- Death Ground: Today's American Infantry in Battle (ISBN 978-0891418306)
- Scenes from an Unfinished War: Low-Intensity Conflict in Korea, 1966–1969 (ISBN 0788112082)
- Leavenworth Papers Number 19: Scenes from Unfinished War (ISBN 978-0160363641)
- Reluctant Allies: The United States Army Air Force and the Soviet Voenno Vozdushnie Sily 1941–1945 (Doctoral Dissertation)
- What Happened at Khafji: Learning the Wrong Lesson (US Army War College strategic research project)
