= Joseph Anderson (U.S. Army general) =

American Army general

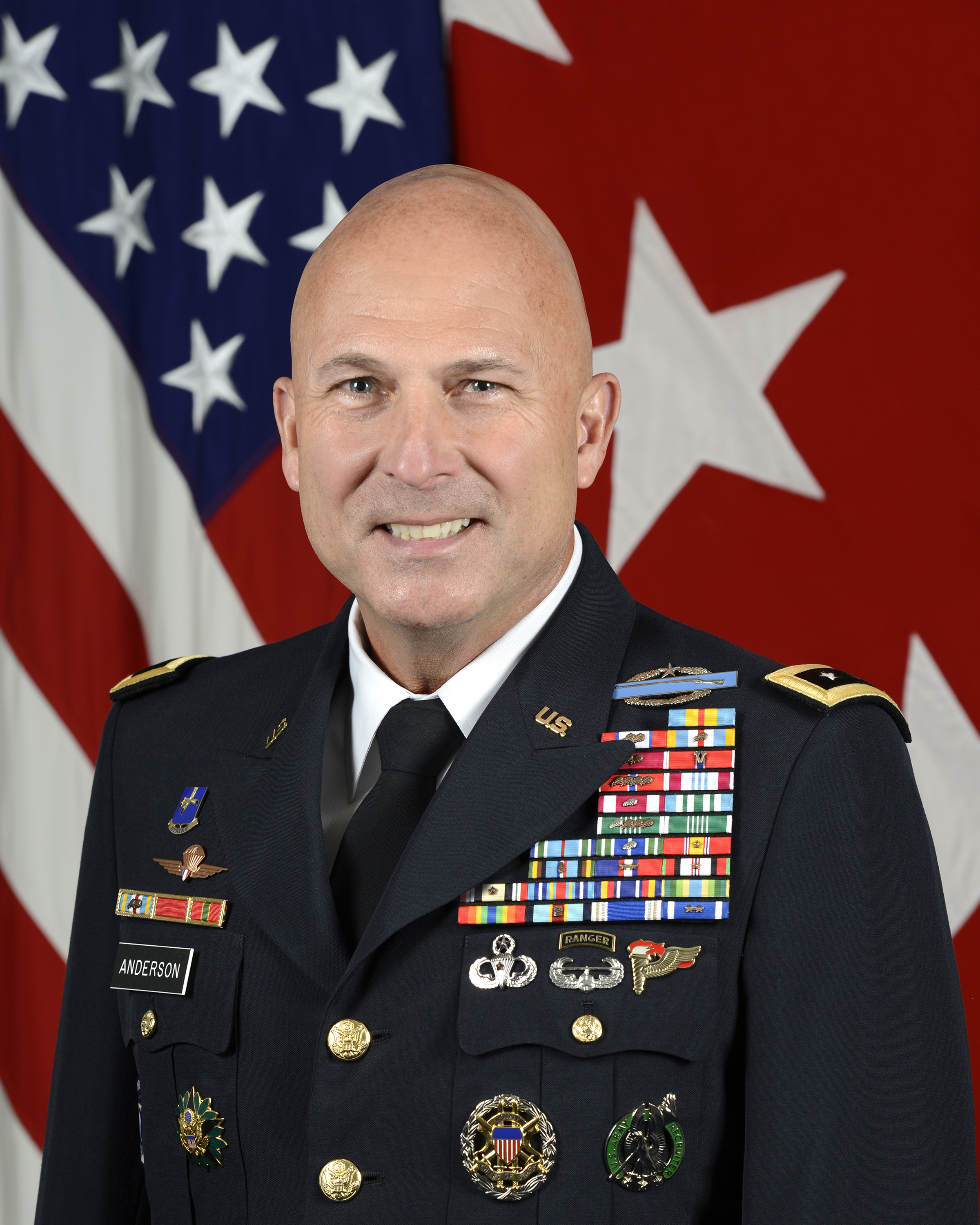
- Anderson in uniform, 2018
- Born: September 14, 1959 (age 67); New York City, United States
- Military career
- Allegiance: United States
- Branch: United States Army
- Service years: 1981–2020
- Rank: Lieutenant General
- Commands: XVIII Airborne Corps; International Security Assistance Force Joint Command; 4th Infantry Division; 2nd Brigade, 101st Airborne Division (Air Assault); 502d Infantry Regiment; 2nd Battalion, 505th Parachute Infantry Regiment; 2nd Battalion, 75th Ranger Regiment
- Conflicts: Operation Just Cause; Iraq War; War in Afghanistan
- Awards: Defense Distinguished Service Medal; Army Distinguished Service Medal (3); Defense Superior Service Medal (2); Legion of Merit (3); Bronze Star Medal (6)

Joseph Anderson (born September 14, 1959) is a retired lieutenant general in the United States Army, who last served as Deputy Chief of Staff of the Army, G-3/5/7, previously serving as the commanding general of the XVIII Airborne Corps, Commander of International Security Assistance Force Joint Command and Deputy Commanding General, US Forces – Afghanistan. Born in New York in 1959, he was commissioned upon his graduation from the United States Military Academy in 1981.

== Awards and decorations ==
Combat Infantryman Badge with Star (denoting 2nd award)
Ranger tab
Master Combat Parachutist Badge with one bronze jump star
Air Assault Badge
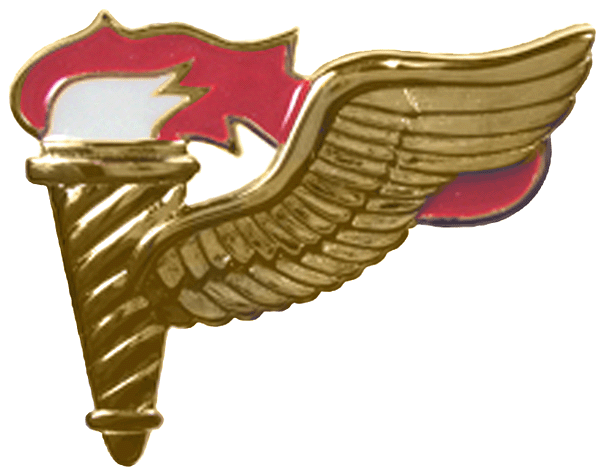
Pathfinder Badge
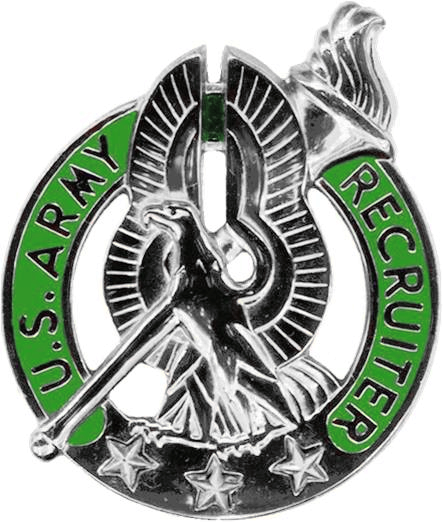
Silver Army Recruiter Badge
Joint Chiefs of Staff Identification Badge
Army Staff Identification Badge
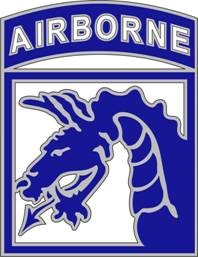
18th Airborne Corps Patch Combat Service Identification Badge
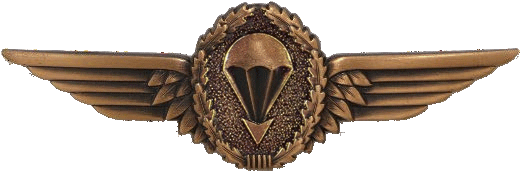
German Parachutist Badge in bronze
Panamanian Parachutist Badge in bronze
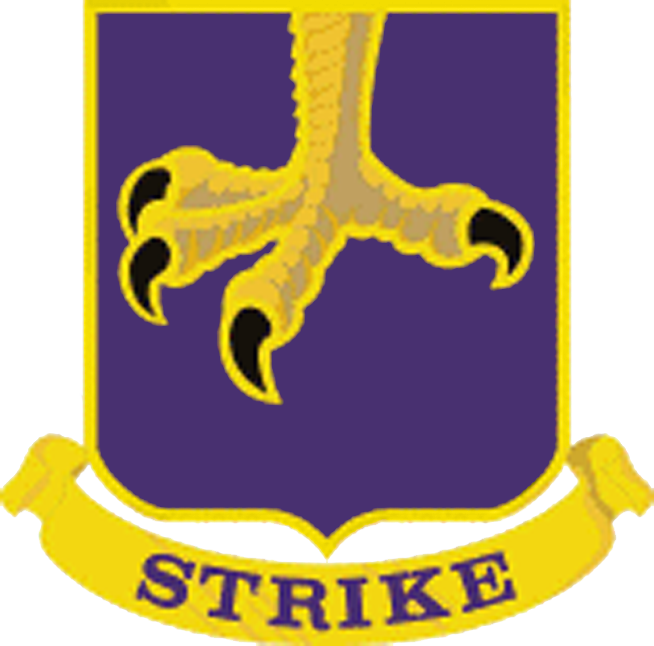
502nd Infantry Regiment Distinctive Unit Insignia
9 Overseas Service Bars

Defense Distinguished Service Medal
Army Distinguished Service Medal with two bronze oak leaf clusters
Defense Superior Service Medal with oak leaf cluster
Legion of Merit with two oak leaf clusters
Bronze Star Medal with Valor device
Bronze Star Medal with four oak leaf clusters
Defense Meritorious Service Medal
Meritorious Service Medal with silver oak leaf cluster
Joint Service Commendation Medal
Army Commendation Medal with eight oak leaf clusters
Army Commendation Medal (second ribbon to denote tenth award)
Joint Service Achievement Medal
Army Achievement Medal with silver oak leaf cluster
Joint Meritorious Unit Award with two oak leaf clusters
Meritorious Unit Commendation
Superior Unit Award
National Defense Service Medal with one bronze service star
Armed Forces Expeditionary Medal with Arrowhead device
Kosovo Campaign Medal with two service stars
Afghanistan Campaign Medal with service star
Iraq Campaign Medal with service star
Global War on Terrorism Expeditionary Medal
Global War on Terrorism Service Medal
Armed Forces Service Medal
Army Service Ribbon
Army Overseas Service Ribbon with bronze award numeral 2
NATO Meritorious Service Medal
NATO Medal for the former Yugoslavia with two service stars
Badge of Honour of the Bundeswehr in gold (Germany)
