= List of United States Army lieutenant generals from 2010 to 2019 =

Flag of an Army lieutenant general

The rank of lieutenant general (or three-star general) is the second-highest rank normally achievable in the United States Army, and the first to have a specified number of appointments set by statute. It ranks above major general (two-star general) and below general (four-star general).

There have been 154 lieutenant generals in the U.S. Army from 2010 to 2019, 35 of whom were promoted to four-star general. All 154 achieved that rank while on active duty in the U.S. Army. Lieutenant generals entered the Army via several paths: 70 were commissioned via Reserve Officers' Training Corps (ROTC) at a civilian university, 62 via the U.S. Military Academy (USMA), 13 via ROTC at a senior military college, six via Officer Candidate School (OCS), two via ROTC at a military junior college, and one via direct commission (direct).

== List of generals ==
Entries in the following list of lieutenant generals are indexed by the numerical order in which each officer was promoted to that rank while on active duty, or by an asterisk (*) if the officer did not serve in that rank while on active duty in the U.S. Army or was promoted to four-star rank while on active duty in the U.S. Army. Each entry lists the general's name, date of rank, (Note: Dates of rank are taken, where available, from the U.S. Army register of active and retired commissioned officers, the General Officer Management Office, or the National Guard Senior Leader Management Office. The date listed is that of the officer's first promotion to lieutenant general. If such a date cannot be found, the next date substituted should be that of the officer's assumption of his/her first three-star appointment. Failing which, the officer's first Senate confirmation date to lieutenant general should be substituted. For officers promoted to lieutenant general on the same date, they should be organized first by date of promotion to four-star rank, and then by the tier of their first listed assignment upon promotion to lieutenant general.) active-duty positions held while serving at three-star rank, (Note: Positions listed are those held by the officer when promoted to lieutenant general. Dates listed are for the officer's full tenure, which may predate promotion to three-star rank or postdate retirement from active duty. Positions held in an acting capacity are italicized.) number of years of active-duty service at three-star rank (Yrs), (Note: The number of years of active-duty service at three-star rank is approximated by subtracting the year in the "Date of rank" column from the last year in the "Position" column. Time spent between active-duty three-star assignments is not counted.) year commissioned and source of commission, (Note: Sources of commission are listed in parentheses after the year of commission and include: the United States Military Academy (USMA); Reserve Officer Training Corps (ROTC) at a civilian university; ROTC at a senior military college such as the Virginia Military Institute (VMI), Norwich University (Norwich), Pennsylvania Military College (PMC), Widener University (Widener), North Georgia College (NGC), University of North Georgia (UNG), or The Citadel (Citadel); Officer Candidate School (OCS); the aviation cadet program (cadet); the Army National Guard (ARNG); direct commission (direct); and battlefield commission (battlefield).) number of years in commission when promoted to three-star rank (YC), (Note: The number of years in commission before being promoted to three-star rank is approximated by subtracting the year in the "Commission" column from the year in the "Date of rank" column.) and other biographical notes. (Note: Notes include years of birth and death; awards of the Medal of Honor, Congressional Gold Medal, Presidential Medal of Freedom, or honors of similar significance; major government appointments; university presidencies or equivalents; familial relationships with significant military officers or government officials such as U.S. Presidents, cabinet secretaries, U.S. Senators, or state governors; and unusual career events such as premature relief or death in office. Officers who served as enlisted soldiers for 7 years or more prior to commissioning are also noted.)

List of U.S. Army lieutenant generals from 2010 to 2019
#	Name	Photo	Date of rank	Position	Yrs	Commission	YC	Notes
1	William N. Phillips		1 Feb 2010	Principal Military Deputy to the Assistant Secretary of the Army for Acquisition, Logistics, and Technology/Director, U.S. Army Acquisition Corps (PMD(ASA(ALT))/DIRAAC), 2010–2014.	4	1976 (ROTC)	34	
2	Thomas P. Bostick		2 Feb 2010	Deputy Chief of Staff, Personnel, Army Staff (DCS G-1), 2010–2012.; U.S. Army Chief of Engineers/Commanding General, U.S. Army Corps of Engineers (CoE/CG USACE), 2012–2016.	6	1978 (USMA)	32	(1956– )
3	Robert L. Caslen Jr.		3 Mar 2010	Commanding General, U.S. Army Combined Arms Center/Commandant, U.S. Army Command and General Staff College/Deputy Commanding General, Combined Arms, U.S. Army Training and Doctrine Command (CG USACAC/CMDT CGSC/DCG-CA TRADOC), 2010–2011.; Chief, Office of Security Cooperation – Iraq (COSC-I), 2011–2013.; Superintendent, U.S. Military Academy, 2013–2018.	8	1975 (USMA)	35	(1953– ) President, University of South Carolina, 2019–2021.
4	John E. Sterling Jr.		3 May 2010	Deputy Commanding General/Chief of Staff, U.S. Army Training and Doctrine Command (DCG/COFS TRADOC), 2010–2012.	2	1976 (USMA)	34	(1953– )
5	John W. Morgan III		5 May 2010	Commander, Allied Force Command Heidelberg (CDRAFC Heidelberg), 2010–2012.	2	1974 (ROTC)	36	
6	Daniel P. Bolger		21 May 2010	Deputy Chief of Staff, Operations, Plans and Training, Army Staff (DCS G-3/5/7), 2010–2011.; Commander, NATO Training Mission – Afghanistan/Commander, Combined Security Transition Command – Afghanistan (CDRNTM-A/CDRCSTC-A), 2011–2013.	3	1978 (Citadel)	32	(1957– )
7	William J. Troy		5 Aug 2010	Director, Army Staff (DAS), 2010–2013.	3	1975 (USMA)	35	
*	Frank J. Grass		30 Sep 2010	Deputy Commander, U.S. Northern Command/Vice Commander, U.S. Element, North American Aerospace Defense Command (DCDRUSNORTHCOM/VCDRNORAD), 2010–2012.	2	1981 (OCS)	29	(1951– ) (Note: Served as Chief, National Guard Bureau (CNGB).) Promoted to general, 7 Sep 2012. Served 12 years in the enlisted ranks before receiving his commission in 1981.
*	Curtis M. Scaparrotti		15 Oct 2010	Commanding General, I Corps, 2010–2011.; Commander, International Security Assistance Force Joint Command/Deputy Commander, U.S. Forces – Afghanistan/Commanding General, I Corps (CDRIJC/DCDRUSFOR-A), 2011–2012.; Director, Joint Staff (DJS), 2012–2013.	3	1978 (USMA)	32	(1956– ) (Note: Served as Commander, U.S. Forces Korea (COMUSFK).) (Note: Served as Supreme Allied Commander Europe (SACEUR).) Promoted to general, 2 Oct 2013.
8	John D. Johnson		9 Nov 2010	Commanding General, Eighth U.S. Army/Chief of Staff, ROK/U.S. Combined Forces Command (CG EUSA/COFS CFC), 2010–2013.; Director, Joint Improvised Explosive Device Defeat Organization (DIRJIEDDO), 2013–2015.	5	1977 (VMI)	33	(1952– )
9	Richard P. Formica		5 Dec 2010	Commanding General, U.S. Army Space and Missile Defense Command/U.S. Army Forces Strategic Command/Commander, Joint Functional Component Command for Integrated Missile Defense (CG USASMDC/ARSTRAT/CDRJFCC IMD), 2010–2013.	3	1977 (ROTC)	33	(1955– )
10	Howard B. Bromberg		4 Jan 2011	Deputy Commanding General/Chief of Staff, U.S. Army Forces Command (DCG/COFS FORSCOM), 2011–2012.; Commanding General, U.S. Army Forces Command (CG FORSCOM), 2011.; Deputy Chief of Staff, Personnel, Army Staff (DCS G-1), 2012–2014.	3	1977 (ROTC)	34	
11	Michael Ferriter		5 Jan 2011	Deputy Commanding General Advising and Training, U.S. Forces – Iraq/Commander, NATO Training Mission – Iraq (DCG(A&T)/CDRNTM-I), 2011.; Assistant Chief of Staff, Installation Management, Army Staff/Commanding General, U.S. Army Installation Management Command (ACSIM/CG IMCOM), 2011–2014.	3	1979 (Citadel)	32	(c. 1958– ) President/CEO, National Veterans Memorial and Museum, 2018–2024.
12	Francis J. Wiercinski		21 Mar 2011	Commanding General, U.S. Army Pacific (CG USARPAC), 2011–2013.	2	1979 (USMA)	32	(1956– )
13	Susan S. Lawrence		25 Mar 2011	Army Chief Information Officer/G-6 (CIO/G-6), 2011–2013.	2	1979 (ROTC)	32	(c. 1954– ) Served seven years in the enlisted ranks before receiving her commission in 1979.
14	Rhett A. Hernandez		25 Mar 2011	Commanding General, U.S. Army Cyber Command (CG ARCYBER), 2010–2013.	2	1976 (USMA)	35	(1953– )
15	J. Michael Bednarek		6 Apr 2011	Commanding General, First Army, 2011–2013.; Chief, Office of Security Cooperation – Iraq (COSC-I), 2013–2015.	4	1975 (ROTC)	36	
16	Donald M. Campbell Jr.		21 Apr 2011	Commanding General, III Corps, 2011–2012.; Commanding General, U.S. Army Europe (CG USAREUR), 2012–2014.	3	1978 (ROTC)	33	(1955– )
*	Vincent K. Brooks		3 Jun 2011	Commanding General, U.S. Army Central (CG USARCENT), 2011–2013.	2	1980 (USMA)	31	(1958– ) Promoted to general, 2 Jul 2013.
*	Joseph L. Votel		10 Jun 2011	Commander, Joint Special Operations Command/Commander, Joint Special Operations Command Forward, U.S. Special Operations Command (CDRJSOC/CDRJSOC-F), 2011–2014.	3	1980 (USMA)	31	(1958– ) (Note: Served as a combatant commander (CCDR).) Promoted to general, 28 Aug 2014.
17	Keith C. Walker		2 Aug 2011	Deputy Commanding General, Futures, U.S. Army Training and Doctrine Command/Director, U.S. Army Capabilities Integration Center (DCG-F TRADOC/DIRARCIC), 2011–2014.	3	1976 (USMA)	35	
*	John F. Campbell		6 Sep 2011	Deputy Chief of Staff, Operations, Plans and Training, Army Staff (DCS G-3/5/7), 2011–2013.	2	1979 (USMA)	32	(1957– ) (Note: Served as Vice Chief of Staff, U.S. Army (VCSA).) (Note: Served as Commander, U.S. Forces-Afghanistan (COMUSFOR-A).) Promoted to general, 8 Mar 2013.
18	Terry A. Wolff		23 Sep 2011	Director, Strategic Plans and Policy, Joint Staff, J5/Senior Member, U.S. Delegation to the U.N. Military Staff Committee (Sr. Member MSC), 2011–2013.	2	1979 (USMA)	32	
19	Michael T. Flynn		23 Sep 2011	Assistant Director of National Intelligence, Partner Engagement, Office of the Director of National Intelligence (ADNI-PE), 2011–2012.; Director, Defense Intelligence Agency/Commander, Joint Functional Component Command for Intelligence, Surveillance and Reconnaissance (DIRDIA/CDRJFCC ISR), 2012–2014.	3	1981 (ROTC)	30	(1958– ) National Security Advisor, 2017. Brother of Army four-star general Charles A. Flynn.
20	William T. Grisoli		11 Oct 2011	Director, Army Office of Business Transformation (DIROBT), 2011–2013.; Director, Army Staff (DAS), 2013–2015.	4	1976 (USMA)	35	
21	Raymond V. Mason		3 Nov 2011	Deputy Chief of Staff, Logistics (DCS G-4), 2011–2014.	3	1978 (ROTC)	33	
22	Joseph E. Martz		10 Nov 2011	Director, Program Analysis and Evaluation, U.S. Department of Defense, 2009–2012.; Military Deputy for Budget to the Assistant Secretary of the Army (Financial Management and Comptroller) (MILDEP ASA(FM&C)), 2012–2014.	3	1979 (USMA)	32	
23	Peter M. Vangjel		14 Nov 2011	Inspector General, U.S. Army (IG), 2011–2014.	3	1977 (ROTC)	34	(1955– )
24	William E. Ingram Jr.		14 Nov 2011	Director, Army National Guard (DIRARNG), 2011–2014.	3	1972 (OCS) (Note: Enlisted in 1970, commissioned as infantry officer in 1972.)	39	(1948– )
*	David G. Perkins		23 Nov 2011	Commanding General, U.S. Army Combined Arms Center/Commandant, U.S. Army Command and General Staff College/Deputy Commanding General, Combined Arms, U.S. Army Training and Doctrine Command (CG USACAC/CMDT CGSC/DCG-CA TRADOC), 2011–2014.	3	1980 (USMA)	31	(1957– ) Promoted to general, 14 Mar 2014.
25	Patricia D. Horoho		5 Dec 2011	Surgeon General, U.S. Army/Commanding General, U.S. Army Medical Command (TSG/CG MEDCOM), 2011–2015.	4	1982 (ROTC)	29	(1960– ) Wife of former government official Raymond T. Horoho.
26	James L. Terry		10 Jan 2012	Commander, International Security Assistance Force Joint Command/Deputy Commander, U.S. Forces – Afghanistan/Commanding General, V Corps (CDRIJC/DCDRUSFOR-A), 2012–2013.; Commanding General, U.S. Army Central (CG USARCENT), 2013–2014.; Commanding General, U.S. Army Central/Commanding General, Coalition Forces Land Component Command (CG USARCENT/CG CFLCC), 2014.; Commander, Combined Joint Task Force – Operation Inherent Resolve/Commanding General, U.S. Army Central/Commanding General, Coalition Forces Land Component Command (CDRCJTF-OIR/CG USARCENT/CG CFLCC), 2014–2015.	3	1978 (NGC) (Note: Graduated from North Georgia College & State University, which merged with Gainesville State College in 2013 and is now the University of North Georgia.)	34	(1957– )
27	Mary A. Legere		2 Apr 2012	Deputy Chief of Staff, Intelligence, Army Staff (DCS G-2), 2012–2016.	4	1982 (ROTC)	30	
28	Raymond P. Palumbo		26 Apr 2012	Director for Defense Intelligence (Warfighter Support) (DDIWS), 2012–2015.	3	1981 (USMA)	31	(1956– )
29	Theodore C. Nicholas II		24 May 2012	Assistant Director of National Intelligence, Partner Engagement, Office of the Director of National Intelligence (ADNI-PE), 2012–2015.	3	1978 (ROTC)	34	
30	David D. Halverson		4 Jun 2012	Deputy Commanding General/Chief of Staff, U.S. Army Training and Doctrine Command (DCG/COFS TRADOC), 2012–2014.; Assistant Chief of Staff, Installation Management, Army Staff/Commanding General, U.S. Army Installation Management Command (ACSIM/CG IMCOM), 2014–2015.; Assistant Chief of Staff, Installation Management, Army Staff (ACSIM), 2015–2016.	4	1979 (USMA)	33	(1957– )
31	Jeffrey W. Talley		9 Jun 2012	Chief, U.S. Army Reserve/Commanding General, U.S. Army Reserve Command (CAR/CG USARC), 2012–2016.	4	1981 (ROTC)	31	(1959– )
*	Daniel B. Allyn		22 Jun 2012	Commanding General, XVIII Airborne Corps, 2012–2013.	1	1981 (USMA)	30	(1959– ) Promoted to general, 10 May 2013.
*	Robert B. Brown		4 Jul 2012	Commanding General, I Corps, 2012–2014.; Commanding General, U.S. Army Combined Arms Center/Commandant, U.S. Army Command and General Staff College/Deputy Commanding General, Combined Arms, U.S. Army Training and Doctrine Command (CG USACAC/CMDT CGSC/DCG-CA TRADOC), 2014–2015.; Commanding General, U.S. Army Combined Arms Center/Commandant, U.S. Army Command and General Staff College/Executive Vice Chancellor, Army University/Deputy Commanding General, Combined Arms, U.S. Army Training and Doctrine Command (CG USACAC/CMDT CGSC/EVC ArmyU/DCG-CA TRADOC), 2015–2016.	4	1981 (USMA)	31	(1959– ) Promoted to general, 30 Apr 2016.
32	William B. Garrett III		20 Jul 2012	Deputy Commanding General/Chief of Staff, U.S. Army Forces Command (DCG/COFS FORSCOM), 2012–2014.; Deputy Commander, U.S. European Command (DCDRUSEUCOM), 2014–2016.	4	1981 (NGC)	31	(1953– )
33	Charles T. Cleveland		24 Jul 2012	Commanding General, U.S. Army Special Operations Command (CG USASOC), 2012–2015.	3	1978 (USMA)	34	(1956– )
34	David R. Hogg		26 Jul 2012	U.S. Military Representative, NATO Military Committee (USMILREP), 2012–2015.	3	1981 (USMA)	31	(1958– )
35	James O. Barclay III		27 Jul 2012	Deputy Chief of Staff, Programs, Army Staff (DCS G-8), 2012–2014.	2	1978 (USMA)	34	
36	Patricia E. McQuistion		2 Aug 2012	Deputy Commanding General/Chief of Staff, U.S. Army Materiel Command (DCG/COFS AMC), 2012–2015.	3	1980 (ROTC)	32	
37	Mark S. Bowman		22 Sep 2012	Director, Command, Control, Communications and Computers/Cyber, Joint Staff, J6, 2012–2016.	4	1978 (Norwich)	34	
38	Frederick B. Hodges III		30 Nov 2012	Commander, Allied Land Command (CDRLANDCOM), 2012–2014.; Commanding General, U.S. Army Europe (CG USAREUR), 2014–2018.	6	1980 (USMA)	32	(1958– )
*	Mark A. Milley		20 Dec 2012	Commanding General, III Corps, 2012–2013.; Commander, International Security Assistance Force Joint Command/Deputy Commander, U.S. Forces – Afghanistan/Commanding General, III Corps (CDRIJC/DCDRUSFOR-A), 2013–2014.	2	1980 (ROTC)	32	(1958– ) (Note: Served as Chief of Staff, U.S. Army (CSA).) (Note: Served as Chairman, Joint Chiefs of Staff (CJCS).) Promoted to general, 15 Aug 2014.
39	Kenneth E. Tovo		13 Feb 2013	Commander, NATO Training Mission – Afghanistan/Commander, Combined Security Transition Command – Afghanistan (CDRNTM-A/CDRCSTC-A), 2013.; Military Deputy Commander, U.S. Southern Command (MILDEPUSSOUTHCOM), 2013–2015.; Commanding General, U.S. Army Special Operations Command (CG USASOC), 2015–2018.	5	1983 (USMA)	30	(1961– )
40	James L. Huggins Jr.		8 Mar 2013	Deputy Chief of Staff, Operations, Plans and Training, Army Staff (DCS G-3/5/7), 2013–2015.	2	1980 (ROTC)	34	
41	Joseph Anderson		6 Jun 2013	Commanding General, XVIII Airborne Corps, 2013–2014.; Commander, International Security Assistance Force Joint Command/Deputy Commander, U.S. Forces – Afghanistan/Commanding General, XVIII Airborne Corps (CDRIJC/DCDRUSFOR-A), 2014.; Commanding General, XVIII Airborne Corps, 2014–2015.; Deputy Chief of Staff, Operations, Plans and Training, Army Staff (DCS G-3/5/7), 2015–2019.	6	1981 (USMA)	32	(1959– )
42	Michael S. Linnington		27 Jun 2013	Military Deputy for Readiness to the Under Secretary of Defense for Personnel and Readiness (MILDEP USD(P&R)), 2013–2015.	2	1980 (USMA)	33	(1958– ) Director, Defense POW/MIA Accounting Agency, 2015–2016.
43	Bernard S. Champoux		27 Jun 2013	Commanding General, Eighth U.S. Army/Chief of Staff, ROK/U.S. Combined Forces Command (CG EUSA/COFS CFC), 2013–2016.	3	1977 (OCS)	36	
44	Thomas W. Spoehr		17 Jul 2013	Director, Army Office of Business Transformation (DIROBT), 2013–2016.	3	1980 (ROTC)	33	
45	Michael S. Tucker		2 Aug 2013	Commanding General, First Army, 2013–2016.	3	1980 (OCS)	33	(1959– )
46	David L. Mann		12 Aug 2013	Commanding General, U.S. Army Space and Missile Defense Command/U.S. Army Forces Strategic Command/Commander, Joint Functional Component Command for Integrated Missile Defense (CG USASMDC/ARSTRAT/CDRJFCC IMD), 2013–2017. (Note: Mann's term was extended beyond statutory limits due to the death of his confirmed successor, John G. Rossi.)	4	1981 (ROTC)	32	(c. 1959– )
47	Edward C. Cardon		2 Sep 2013	Commanding General, U.S. Army Cyber Command (CG ARCYBER), 2013–2014.; Commanding General, U.S. Army Cyber Command/Commanding General, Second U.S. Army (CG ARCYBER), 2014.; Commanding General, U.S. Army Cyber Command/Commanding General, Second U.S. Army/Commander, Joint Force Headquarters – Cyber (Army) (CG ARCYBER/CDRJFHQ-C), 2014–2016.; Director, Army Office of Business Transformation (DIROBT), 2016–2018.	5	1982 (USMA)	31	(1960– )
*	Robert B. Abrams		3 Sep 2013	Senior Military Assistant to the Secretary of Defense (SMA SecDef), 2013–2015.	2	1982 (USMA)	31	(1960– ) Promoted to general, 10 Aug 2015. Son of Army four-star general Creighton Abrams and brother of Army four-star general John N. Abrams.
48	Flora D. Darpino		3 Sep 2013	Judge Advocate General, U.S. Army (TJAG), 2013–2017.	4	1987 (direct)	26	(1961– ) (Note: Promoted directly from rank of brigadier general.) First woman to become judge advocate general of the Army.
49	Perry L. Wiggins		4 Sep 2013	Commanding General, U.S. Army North (CG ARNORTH), 2013–2016.	3	1983 (ROTC)	30	(1962– )
50	William C. Mayville Jr.		6 Nov 2013	Director, Operations, Joint Staff, J3, 2013–2015.; Director, Joint Staff (DJS), 2015–2017.; Deputy Commander, U.S. Cyber Command (DCDRUSCYBERCOM), 2017–2018. (Note: Mayville held the position concurrently with Marine lieutenant general Vincent R. Stewart for his full tenure. Stewart functioned as deputy for day-to-day running of USCYBERCOM whereas Mayville functioned as deputy in charge of separating USCYBERCOM from the National Security Agency.)	5	1982 (USMA)	31	
51	Robert S. Ferrell		23 Dec 2013	Army Chief Information Officer/G-6 (CIO/G-6), 2013–2017.	4	1983 (ROTC)	30	First African-American to serve as Army chief information officer.
52	Stephen R. Lanza		7 Feb 2014	Commanding General, I Corps, 2014–2017.	3	1980 (USMA)	34	(1957– )
53	Bennet S. Sacolick		21 Mar 2014	Deputy Director, Strategic Operational Planning, National Counterterrorism Center, 2014–2016.	2	1982 (OCS)	32	
54	Kevin W. Mangum		28 Mar 2014	Deputy Commanding General/Chief of Staff, U.S. Army Training and Doctrine Command (DCG/COFS TRADOC), 2014–2017.	3	1982 (USMA)	32	(1960– )
55	Michael E. Williamson		4 Apr 2014	Principal Military Deputy to the Assistant Secretary of the Army for Acquisition, Logistics and Technology/Director, U.S. Army Acquisition Corps (PMD(ASA(ALT))/DIRAAC), 2014–2017.	3	1983 (ROTC)	31	
*	Raymond A. Thomas III		22 May 2014	Associate Director, Military Affairs, Central Intelligence Agency (ADMA), 2013–2014.; Commander, Joint Special Operations Command/Commander, Joint Special Operations Command Forward, U.S. Special Operations Command (CDRJSOC/CDRJSOC-F), 2014–2016.	2	1980 (USMA)	34	(1958– ) Promoted to general, 30 Mar 2016.
56	Anthony G. Crutchfield		6 Jun 2014	Deputy Commander, U.S. Pacific Command (DCDRUSPACOM), 2014–2017.	3	1982 (ROTC)	32	(1960– )
57	H. R. McMaster		15 Jul 2014	Deputy Commanding General, Futures, U.S. Army Training and Doctrine Command/Director, U.S. Army Capabilities Integration Center (DCG-F TRADOC/DIRARCIC), 2014–2017.; National Security Advisor (NSA), 2017–2018. (Note: The office is formally known as the Assistant to the President for National Security Affairs (APNSA), but is listed here under the more commonly-used moniker of National Security Advisor (NSA).)	4	1984 (USMA)	30	(1962– ) Resigned, 2018.
58	Patrick J. Donahue II		29 Jul 2014	Deputy Commanding General/Chief of Staff, U.S. Army Forces Command (DCG/COFS FORSCOM), 2014–2017.	3	1980 (USMA)	34	(1957– )
*	James C. McConville		4 Aug 2014	Deputy Chief of Staff, Personnel, Army Staff (DCS G-1), 2014–2017.	3	1981 (USMA)	33	(1959– ) Promoted to general, 16 Jun 2017.
59	Sean B. MacFarland		8 Aug 2014	Commanding General, III Corps, 2014–2015.; Commander, Combined Joint Task Force – Operation Inherent Resolve/Commanding General, III Corps (CDRCJTF-OIR), 2015–2016.; Commanding General, III Corps, 2016–2017.; Deputy Commanding General/Chief of Staff, U.S. Army Training and Doctrine Command (DCG/COFS TRADOC), 2017–2018.	4	1981 (USMA)	33	(1959– )
60	Karen E. Dyson		12 Aug 2014	Military Deputy for Budget to the Assistant Secretary of the Army (Financial Management and Comptroller) (MILDEP ASA(FM&C)), 2014–2017.	3	1980 (ROTC)	34	(1959– ) First female finance officer in any service to achieve three-star rank.
*	Gustave F. Perna		18 Sep 2014	Deputy Chief of Staff, Logistics, Army Staff (DCS G-4), 2014–2016.	2	1981 (VFMAC)	33	(1960– ) Promoted to general, 30 Sep 2016.
*	John W. Nicholson Jr.		23 Oct 2014	Commander, Allied Land Command (CDRLANDCOM), 2014–2016.	2	1982 (USMA)	32	(1960– ) Promoted to general, 2 Mar 2016. Son of Army brigadier general John W. Nicholson; nephew of U.S. Secretary of Veterans Affairs Robert J. Nicholson.
61	Anthony R. Ierardi		11 Dec 2014	Deputy Chief of Staff, Programs, Army Staff (DCS G-8), 2014–2015.; Director, Force Structure, Resources and Assessment, Joint Staff, J8, 2015–2019.	5	1982 (ROTC)	32	(1960– )
62	David E. Quantock		12 Dec 2014	Inspector General, U.S. Army (IG), 2014–2018.	4	1980 (Norwich)	34	(1962– ) Provost Marshal General, U.S. Army, 2011–2014.
63	Frederick S. Rudesheim		1 Jan 2015	U.S. Security Coordinator for Israel and the Palestinian National Authority (USSC), 2015–2017.	2	1981 (ROTC)	34	Director, William J. Perry Center for Hemispheric Defense Studies, 2018–2022.
64	Joseph P. DiSalvo		27 Mar 2015	Military Deputy Commander, U.S. Southern Command (MILDEPUSSOUTHCOM), 2015–2018.	3	1981 (USMA)	34	
65	Timothy J. Kadavy		27 Mar 2015	Director, Army National Guard (DIRARNG), 2015–2019.	4	1987 (ROTC)	28	(1963– ) (Note: Reverted to major general, March 2019; retired as lieutenant general, 3 August 2020.) (Note: Nomination as Vice Chief, National Guard Bureau (VCNGB) returned to the President, 2020.)
66	Larry D. Wyche		10 Apr 2015	Deputy Commanding General/Chief of Staff, U.S. Army Materiel Command (DCG/COFS AMC), 2015–2017.	2	1982 (ROTC)	33	(1957– )
*	Stephen J. Townsend		5 May 2015	Commanding General, XVIII Airborne Corps, 2015–2016.; Commander, Combined Joint Task Force – Operation Inherent Resolve/Commanding General, XVIII Airborne Corps (CDRCJTF-OIR), 2016–2017.; Commanding General, XVIII Airborne Corps, 2017–2018.	3	1982 (NGC)	33	(1959– ) Promoted to general, 3 Mar 2018.
67	Gary H. Cheek		7 Jul 2015	Director, Army Staff (DAS), 2015–2018.	3	1980 (USMA)	35	
68	Ronald F. Lewis		23 Jul 2015	Senior Military Assistant to the Secretary of Defense (SMA SecDef), 2015.	0	1987 (USMA)	28	(1966– ) (Note: Relieved with reversion to major general, November 2015; retired as brigadier general, May 2017.) Relieved, 2015.
69	Alan R. Lynn		23 Jul 2015	Director, Defense Information Systems Agency/Commander, Joint Force Headquarters – Department of Defense Information Network (DIRDISA/CDRJFHQ-DoDIN), 2015–2018.	3	1979 (ROTC)	36	
70	Michael H. Shields		27 Jul 2015	Director, Joint Improvised Explosive Device Defeat Organization (DIRJIEDDO), 2015–2018.	3	1983 (Norwich)	32	
*	Daniel R. Hokanson		15 Aug 2015	Deputy Commander, U.S. Northern Command/Vice Commander, U.S. Element, North American Aerospace Defense Command (DCDRUSNORTHCOM/VCDRNORAD), 2015–2016.; Vice Chief, National Guard Bureau (VCNGB), 2016–2019.; Director, Army National Guard (DIRARNG), 2019–2020.	5	1986 (USMA)	29	(1963– ) Promoted to general, 3 Aug 2020.
*	John M. Murray		27 Aug 2015	Deputy Chief of Staff, Programs, Army Staff (DCS G-8), 2015–2018.	3	1982 (ROTC)	33	(1960– ) Promoted to general, 24 Aug 2018.
*	Stephen R. Lyons		3 Sep 2015	Deputy Commander, U.S. Transportation Command (DCDRUSTRANSCOM), 2015–2017.; Director, Logistics, Joint Staff, J4, 2017–2018.	3	1983 (ROTC)	32	(c. 1962– ) Promoted to general, 24 Aug 2018.
71	Kenneth R. Dahl		3 Nov 2015	Commanding General, U.S. Army Installation Management Command (CG IMCOM), 2015–2018.	3	1982 (USMA)	33	
*	Michael X. Garrett		17 Nov 2015	Commanding General, U.S. Army Central/Commanding General, Coalition Forces Land Component Command (CG USARCENT/CG CFLCC), 2015–2019.	4	1984 (ROTC)	31	(1961– ) Promoted to general, 21 Mar 2019. Chairman, American Battle Monuments Commission, 2023–present.
72	Thomas S. Vandal		2 Feb 2016	Commanding General, Eighth U.S. Army/Chief of Staff, ROK/U.S. Combined Forces Command (CG EUSA/COFS CFC), 2016–2018.	2	1982 (USMA)	34	(1960–2018)
73	Nadja Y. West		9 Feb 2016	Surgeon General, U.S. Army/Commanding General, U.S. Army Medical Command (TSG/CG MEDCOM), 2016–2019.	3	1982 (USMA)	34	(1961– ) First African-American woman to achieve the rank of lieutenant general in the Army.
74	Robert P. Ashley Jr.		2 Mar 2016	Deputy Chief of Staff, Intelligence, Army Staff (DCS G-2), 2016–2017.; Director, Defense Intelligence Agency (DIRDIA), 2017–2020.	4	1984 (ROTC)	32	(1960– )
*	Austin S. Miller		24 Mar 2016	Commander, Joint Special Operations Command/Commander, Joint Special Operations Command Forward, U.S. Special Operations Command (CDRJSOC/CDRJSOC-F), 2016–2018.	2	1983 (USMA)	33	(1961– ) Promoted to general, 2 Sep 2018.
75	Michael K. Nagata		13 May 2016	Deputy Director, Strategic Operational Planning, National Counterterrorism Center, 2016–2019.	3	1982 (ROTC)	34	(1954– )
76	Todd T. Semonite		19 May 2016	U.S. Army Chief of Engineers/Commanding General, U.S. Army Corps of Engineers (CoE/CG USACE), 2016–2020.	4	1979 (USMA)	37	(1957– )
77	Michael D. Lundy		1 Jun 2016	Commanding General, U.S. Army Combined Arms Center/Commandant, U.S. Army Command and General Staff College/Executive Vice Chancellor, Army University/Deputy Commanding General, Combined Arms, U.S. Army Training and Doctrine Command (CG USACAC/CMDT CGSC/EVC ArmyU/DCG-CA TRADOC), 2016–2019.	3	1987 (ROTC)	29	
*	Darryl A. Williams		2 Jun 2016	Commander, Allied Land Command (CDRLANDCOM), 2016–2018.; Superintendent, U.S. Military Academy, 2018–2022.	6	1983 (USMA)	33	(1961– ) Promoted to general, 27 Jun 2022. First African-American superintendent of the U.S. Military Academy.
78	Gwendolyn Bingham		29 Jun 2016	Assistant Chief of Staff, Installation Management, Army Staff (ACSIM), 2016–2019.	3	1981 (ROTC)	35	(1959– ) Quartermaster General, U.S. Army, 2010–2012.
79	Charles D. Luckey		30 Jun 2016	Chief, U.S. Army Reserve/Commanding General, U.S. Army Reserve Command (CAR/CG USARC), 2016–2020.	4	1977 (ROTC)	39	(1955– )
80	Stephen M. Twitty		15 Jul 2016	Commanding General, First Army, 2016–2018.; Deputy Commander, U.S. European Command (DCDRUSEUCOM), 2018–2020.	4	1985 (ROTC)	31	(1963– )
81	Jeffrey S. Buchanan		26 Aug 2016	Commanding General, U.S. Army North (CG ARNORTH), 2016–2019.	3	1982 (ROTC)	34	
82	Aundre F. Piggee		30 Sep 2016	Deputy Chief of Staff, Logistics, Army Staff (DCS G-4), 2016–2019.	3	1981 (ROTC)	36	(1959– ) (Note: Retired as major general, December 2019.)
*	Paul M. Nakasone		14 Oct 2016	Commanding General, U.S. Army Cyber Command/Commanding General, Second U.S. Army/Commander, Joint Force Headquarters – Cyber (Army) (CG ARCYBER/CDRJFHQ-C), 2016–2017.; Commanding General, U.S. Army Cyber Command/Commander, Joint Force Headquarters – Cyber (Army) (CG ARCYBER/CDRJFHQ-C), 2017–2018.	2	1986 (ROTC)	32	(1963– ) Promoted to general, 4 May 2018. Director, National Security Agency, 2018–2024.
83	Reynold N. Hoover		24 Oct 2016	Deputy Commander, U.S. Northern Command/Vice Commander, U.S. Element, North American Aerospace Defense Command (DCDRUSNORTHCOM/VCDRNORAD), 2016–2018.	2	1983 (USMA)	33	(1961– )
*	James H. Dickinson		5 Jan 2017	Commanding General, U.S. Army Space and Missile Defense Command/U.S. Army Forces Strategic Command/Commander, Joint Functional Component Command for Integrated Missile Defense (CG USASMDC/ARSTRAT/CDRJFCC IMD), 2017–2019.; Deputy Commander, U.S. Space Command (DCDRUSSPACECOM), 2019–2020.	3	1985 (ROTC)	32	(c. 1962– ) Promoted to general, 20 Aug 2020.
*	Paul E. Funk II		31 Mar 2017	Commander, Combined Joint Task Force – Operation Inherent Resolve/Commanding General, III Corps (CDRCJTF-OIR), 2017–2018.; Commanding General, III Corps, 2018–2019.	2	1984 (ROTC)	33	(1962– ) Promoted to general, 21 Jun 2019. Son and son-in-law of Army lieutenant generals Paul E. Funk and John J. Yeosock.
84	Gary J. Volesky		3 Apr 2017	Commanding General, I Corps, 2017–2020.	3	1983 (ROTC)	30	(1961– )
85	Darrell K. Williams		1 May 2017	Director, Defense Logistics Agency (DIRDLA), 2017–2020.	3	1983 (ROTC)	34	(1961– ) President, Hampton University, 2022–present.
*	Bryan P. Fenton		12 May 2017	Deputy Commander, U.S. Pacific Command (DCDRUSPACOM), 2017–2018.; Deputy Commander, U.S. Indo-Pacific Command (DCDRUSINDOPACOM), 2018–2019.; Senior Military Assistant to the Secretary of Defense (SMA SecDef), 2019–2021.; Commander, Joint Special Operations Command/Commander, Joint Special Operations Command Forward, U.S. Special Operations Command (CDRJSOC/CDRJSOC-F), 2021–2022.	5	1987 (ROTC)	30	(1965– ) Promoted to general, 30 Aug 2022.
86	Paul A. Ostrowski		15 May 2017	Principal Military Deputy to the Assistant Secretary of the Army for Acquisition, Logistics and Technology/Director, U.S. Army Acquisition Corps (PMD(ASA(ALT))/DIRAAC), 2017–2020.	3	1985 (USMA)	32	(c. 1963– ) Director, Supply, Production, and Distribution, Operation Warp Speed/Federal COVID-19 Response for Vaccine and Therapeutics, 2020–2021.
87	Thomas C. Seamands		26 May 2017	Deputy Chief of Staff, Personnel, Army Staff (DCS G-1), 2017–2020.	3	1981 (ROTC)	36	(1959– )
*	Laura J. Richardson		9 Jun 2017	Deputy Commanding General/Chief of Staff, U.S. Army Forces Command (DCG/COFS FORSCOM), 2017–2019.; Commanding General, U.S. Army Forces Command (CG FORSCOM), 2018–2019.; Commanding General, U.S. Army North (CG ARNORTH), 2019–2021.	4	1986 (ROTC)	31	(1963– ) Promoted to general, 29 Oct 2021. Wife of Army lieutenant general James M. Richardson.
88	Charles N. Pede		14 Jul 2017	Judge Advocate General, U.S. Army (TJAG), 2017–2021.	4	1984 (ROTC)	33	
89	Charles W. Hooper		31 Jul 2017	Director, Defense Security Cooperation Agency (DIRDSCA), 2017–2020.	3	1979 (USMA)	38	(1957– )
*	Richard D. Clarke Jr.		1 Aug 2017	Director, Strategic Plans and Policy, Joint Staff, J5/Senior Member, U.S. Delegation to the U.N. Military Staff Committee (Sr. Member MSC), 2017–2019.	2	1984 (USMA)	33	(1960– ) Promoted to general, 29 Mar 2019.
*	Edward M. Daly		1 Aug 2017	Deputy Commanding General/Chief of Staff, U.S. Army Materiel Command (DCG/COFS AMC), 2017–2020.	3	1987 (USMA)	30	(1965– ) Promoted to general, 2 Jul 2020.
90	Bruce T. Crawford		1 Aug 2017 (Note: The promotion ceremony was held on 17 August 2017, with date of rank backdated to 1 August 2017.)	Army Chief Information Officer/G-6 (CIO/G-6), 2017–2020.	3	1986 (ROTC)	31	
91	Thomas A. Horlander		3 Aug 2017	Military Deputy for Budget to the Assistant Secretary of the Army (Financial Management and Comptroller) (MILDEP ASA(FM&C)), 2017–2021.	4	1983 (OCS)	34	
92	Eric P. Wendt		31 Oct 2017	U.S. Security Coordinator for Israel and the Palestinian National Authority (USSC), 2017–2019.; Commander, NATO Special Operations Headquarters (CDRNSHQ), 2019–2021.	4	1986 (ROTC)	31	(Note: Nomination as U.S. Ambassador to Qatar withdrawn, 2021.)
93	Michael A. Bills		5 Jan 2018	Commanding General, Eighth U.S. Army/Chief of Staff, ROK/U.S. Combined Forces Command (CG EUSA/COFS CFC), 2018–2020.	2	1983 (ROTC)	35	(1958– )
*	Christopher G. Cavoli		18 Jan 2018	Commanding General, U.S. Army Europe (CG USAREUR), 2018–2020.	2	1987 (ROTC)	31	(c. 1964– ) Promoted to general, 1 Oct 2020.
*	Paul J. LaCamera		19 Jan 2018	Commander, Combined Joint Task Force – Operation Inherent Resolve/Commanding General, XVIII Airborne Corps (CDRCJTF-OIR), 2018–2019.	1	1985 (USMA)	33	(1963– ) Promoted to general, 18 Nov 2019. Brother-in-law of Army major general Jeffrey L. Bannister.
94	Scott D. Berrier		30 Jan 2018	Deputy Chief of Staff, Intelligence, Army Staff (DCS G-2), 2018–2020.; Director, Defense Intelligence Agency (DIRDIA), 2020–2024.	6	1983 (ROTC)	35	(1962– )
95	Leslie C. Smith		7 Feb 2018	Inspector General, U.S. Army (IG), 2018–2021.	3	1983 (ROTC)	35	
96	Theodore D. Martin		2 Mar 2018	Deputy Commanding General/Chief of Staff, U.S. Army Training and Doctrine Command (DCG/COFS TRADOC), 2018–2021.; Commanding General, U.S. Army Combined Arms Center/Commandant, U.S. Army Command and General Staff College/Executive Vice Chancellor, Army University/Deputy Commanding General, Combined Arms, U.S. Army Training and Doctrine Command (CG USACAC/CMDT CGSC/EVC ArmyU/DCG-CA TRADOC), 2021–2022.	4	1983 (USMA)	35	(1960– )
97	Eric J. Wesley		12 Apr 2018	Deputy Commanding General, Futures, U.S. Army Training and Doctrine Command/Director, U.S. Army Capabilities Integration Center (DCG-F TRADOC/DIRARCIC), 2018.; Deputy Commanding General, Futures and Concepts, U.S. Army Futures Command/Director, Futures and Concepts Center (DCG-FC AFC/DIRFCC), 2018–2020.	2	1986 (USMA)	32	(1964– )
98	Stephen G. Fogarty		11 May 2018	Commanding General, U.S. Army Cyber Command/Commander, Joint Force Headquarters – Cyber (Army) (CG ARCYBER/CDRJFHQ-C), 2018–2022.	4	1983 (NGC)	35	(c. 1965– )
99	Darsie D. Rogers Jr.		24 May 2018	Deputy Director for Combat Support, Defense Threat Reduction Agency (DEPDIRDTRA), 2018–2020.	2	1987 (ROTC)	31	
100	Francis M. Beaudette		8 Jun 2018	Commanding General, U.S. Army Special Operations Command (CG USASOC), 2018–2021.	3	1989 (Citadel)	29	
*	Joseph M. Martin		2 Jul 2018	Director, Army Staff (DAS), 2018–2019.	1	1986 (USMA)	32	(1962– ) Promoted to general, 26 Jul 2019.
101	John C. Thomson III		3 Aug 2018	Commander, Allied Land Command (CDRLANDCOM), 2018–2020.	2	1986 (USMA)	32	(1961– )
102	James F. Pasquarette		29 Aug 2018	Deputy Chief of Staff, Programs, Army Staff (DCS G-8), 2018–2021.	3	1983 (ROTC)	35	(1961– )
103	James M. Richardson		5 Sep 2018	Deputy Commanding General, U.S. Army Futures Command (DCG AFC), 2018–2022.; Commanding General, U.S. Army Futures Command (CG AFC), 2021–2022.	4	1983 (ROTC)	35	(1960– ) Husband of Army four-star general Laura J. Richardson.
104	Bradley A. Becker		5 Sep 2018	Commanding General, U.S. Army Installation Management Command (CG IMCOM), 2018–2019.	1	1986 (ROTC)	32	(c. 1965– ) Relieved, 2019.
105	Thomas S. James Jr.		9 Oct 2018	Commanding General, First Army, 2018–2021.	3	1985 (Citadel)	33	(1963– )
*	James E. Rainey		12 Oct 2018	Commander, Combined Security Transition Command-Afghanistan/Deputy Chief of Staff Security Assistance, Headquarters Resolute Support Mission (CDRCSTC-A/DCOFS-SA), 2018–2019.; Commanding General, U.S. Army Combined Arms Center/Commandant, U.S. Army Command and General Staff College/Executive Vice Chancellor, Army University/Deputy Commanding General, Combined Arms, U.S. Army Training and Doctrine Command (CG USACAC/CMDT CGSC/EVC ArmyU/DCG-CA TRADOC), 2019–2021.; Deputy Chief of Staff, Operations, Plans and Training, Army Staff (DCS G-3/5/7), 2021–2022.	4	1987 (ROTC)	33	(c. 1964– ) Promoted to general, 4 Oct 2022.
*	Andrew P. Poppas		28 Feb 2019	Director, Operations, Joint Staff, J3, 2019–2020.; Director, Joint Staff (DJS), 2020–2022.	3	1988 (USMA)	31	(1966– ) Promoted to general, 8 Jul 2022.
106	Terry R. Ferrell		8 Mar 2019	Commanding General, U.S. Army Central/Commanding General, Coalition Forces Land Component Command (CG USARCENT/CG CFLCC), 2019–2021.	2	1984 (ROTC)	35	(1962– )
107	Karen H. Gibson		28 Mar 2019	Deputy Director of National Intelligence, National Security Partnerships (DDNI-NSP), 2019–2020.	1	1986 (ROTC)	33	Sergeant at Arms, U.S. Senate, 2021–2025.
108	L. Neil Thurgood		29 Mar 2019	Director, Hypersonics, Directed Energy, Space and Rapid Acquisition, Office of the Assistant Secretary of the Army for Acquisition, Logistics and Technology, 2019–2022.	3	1986 (ROTC) (Note: Enlisted in 1983, commissioned as aviation officer in 1986.)	33	
109	Walter E. Piatt		30 May 2019	Director, Army Staff (DAS), 2019–2024.	5	1987 (ROTC)	32	(c. 1960– ) Served eight years in the enlisted ranks before receiving his commission in 1987.
110	Robert P. White		5 Jun 2019	Commander, Combined Joint Task Force – Operation Inherent Resolve/Commanding General, III Corps (CDRCJTF-OIR), 2019–2020.; Commanding General, III Corps, 2020–2021.; Commanding General, III Armored Corps, 2021–2022.	3	1986 (ROTC)	33	(1963– )
111	Leopoldo A. Quintas Jr.		17 Jun 2019	Deputy Commanding General/Chief of Staff, U.S. Army Forces Command (DCG/COFS FORSCOM), 2019–2021.	2	1986 (USMA)	33	(1964– )
*	Charles A. Flynn		27 Jun 2019	Deputy Chief of Staff, Operations, Plans and Training, Army Staff (DCS G-3/5/7), 2019–2021.	2	1985 (ROTC)	34	(1963– ) Promoted to general, 4 Jun 2021. Brother of Army lieutenant general and former National Security Advisor Michael T. Flynn.
112	Ronald J. Place		3 Sep 2019	Director, Defense Health Agency (DIRDHA), 2019–2023.	4	1986 (ROTC)	33	
113	Duane A. Gamble		16 Sep 2019	Deputy Chief of Staff, Logistics, Army Staff (DCS G-4), 2019–2022.	3	1985 (ROTC)	34	(c. 1964– ) (Note: Suspended as deputy chief of staff for logistics, February 2022; retired as major general, April 2022.) Relieved, 2022.
114	Ricky L. Waddell		27 Sep 2019	Assistant to the Chairman of the Joint Chiefs of Staff (ACJCS), 2018–2021.	2	1982 (USMA)	37	(1959– ) Deputy National Security Advisor, 2017–2018.
115	Jason T. Evans		27 Sep 2019	Deputy Chief of Staff, Installations, Army Staff (DCS G-9), 2019–2022.	3	1981 (WMA)	38	
116	R. Scott Dingle		27 Sep 2019	Surgeon General, U.S. Army (TSG), 2019–2020.; Surgeon General, U.S. Army/Commanding General, U.S. Army Medical Command (TSG/CG MEDCOM), 2020–2024.	5	1988 (ROTC)	31	(1965– )
*	Michael E. Kurilla		7 Oct 2019	Commanding General, XVIII Airborne Corps, 2019–2022.	3	1988 (USMA)	31	(1966– ) Promoted to general, 1 Apr 2022.
117	Mark C. Schwartz		3 Nov 2019	U.S. Security Coordinator for Israel and the Palestinian National Authority (USSC), 2019–2021.	2	1987 (ROTC)	32	
118	E. John Deedrick Jr.		30 Nov 2019	Commander, Combined Security Transition Command-Afghanistan/Deputy Chief of Staff Security Assistance, Headquarters Resolute Support Mission (CDRCSTC-A/DCOFS-SA), 2019–2021.; U.S. Military Representative, NATO Military Committee (USMILREP), 2021–2023.	4	1988 (Citadel)	31	
119	Daniel L. Karbler		6 Dec 2019	Commanding General, U.S. Army Space and Missile Defense Command/U.S. Army Forces Strategic Command/Commander, Joint Functional Component Command for Integrated Missile Defense (CG USASMDC/ARSTRAT/CDRJFCC IMD), 2019–2024.	5	1987 (USMA)	32	(1966– )

== Background ==
=== Three-star positions, elevations and reductions ===
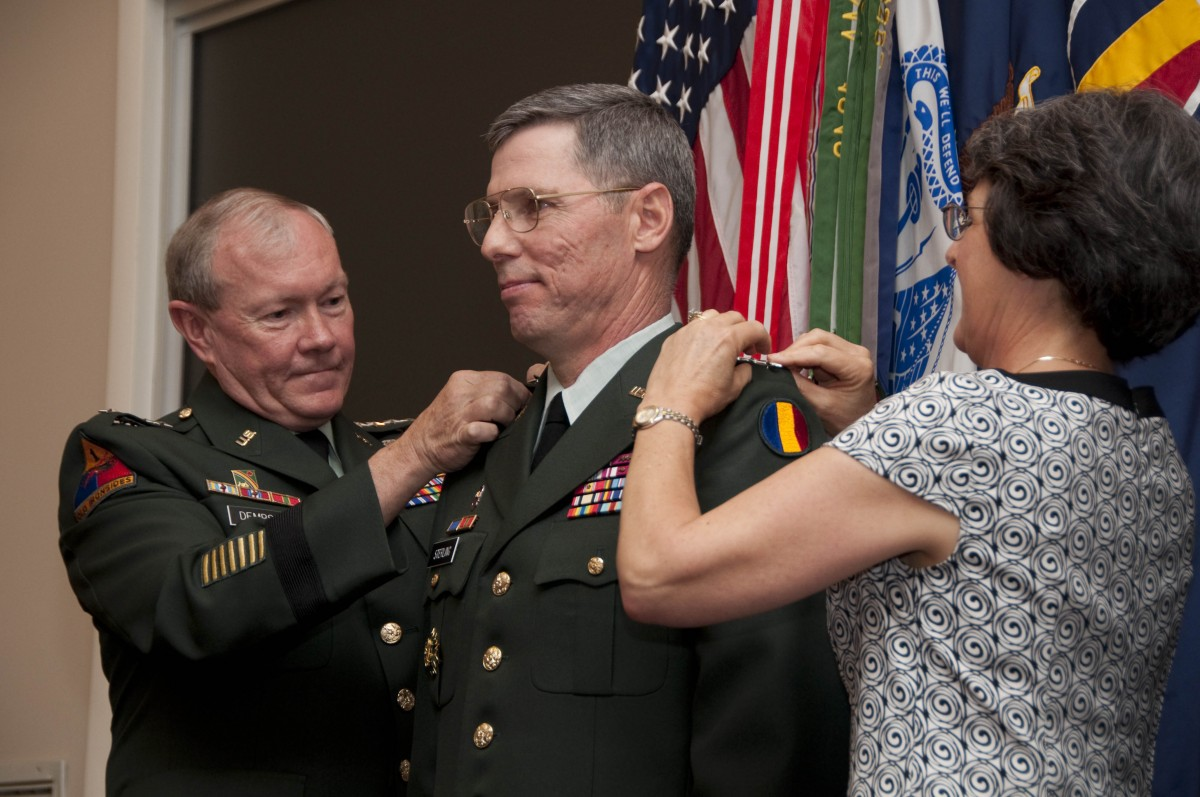
Maj. Gen. John E. Sterling Jr. is pinned with lieutenant general's stars by his wife Catherine and Gen. Martin Dempsey on 3 May 2010.

There were several developments relating to three-star positions of the United States Army from 2010 to 2019.

- A majority of three-star positions stationed in Iraq were eliminated or relegated below said grade with the end of the Iraq War in 2011 and concurrent withdrawal of combat forces from the country. By December 2011, the two deputy commanding generals of U.S. Forces – Iraq and commander of NATO Training Mission – Iraq had their positions eliminated, leaving the chief of the Office of Security Cooperation (relegated to two-star level by 2015) in an advisory role to Iraqi defense and interior officials.
- The rank of the vice chief of the National Guard Bureau was raised to lieutenant general in 2012 with the passage of the 2012 National Defense Authorization Act, achieving parity with the directors of the Army National Guard and Air National Guard. Major General Joseph L. Lengyel was subsequently promoted and assumed the role of vice chief on 18 August 2012. This was the fourth three-star billet allocated to the National Guard, the others being the aforementioned ARNG/ANG directors and the deputy commander of U.S. Northern Command. (Note: Per the 2008 National Defense Authorization Act, at least one deputy commander of USNORTHCOM must be a National Guard officer unless the commander is already such an officer.)

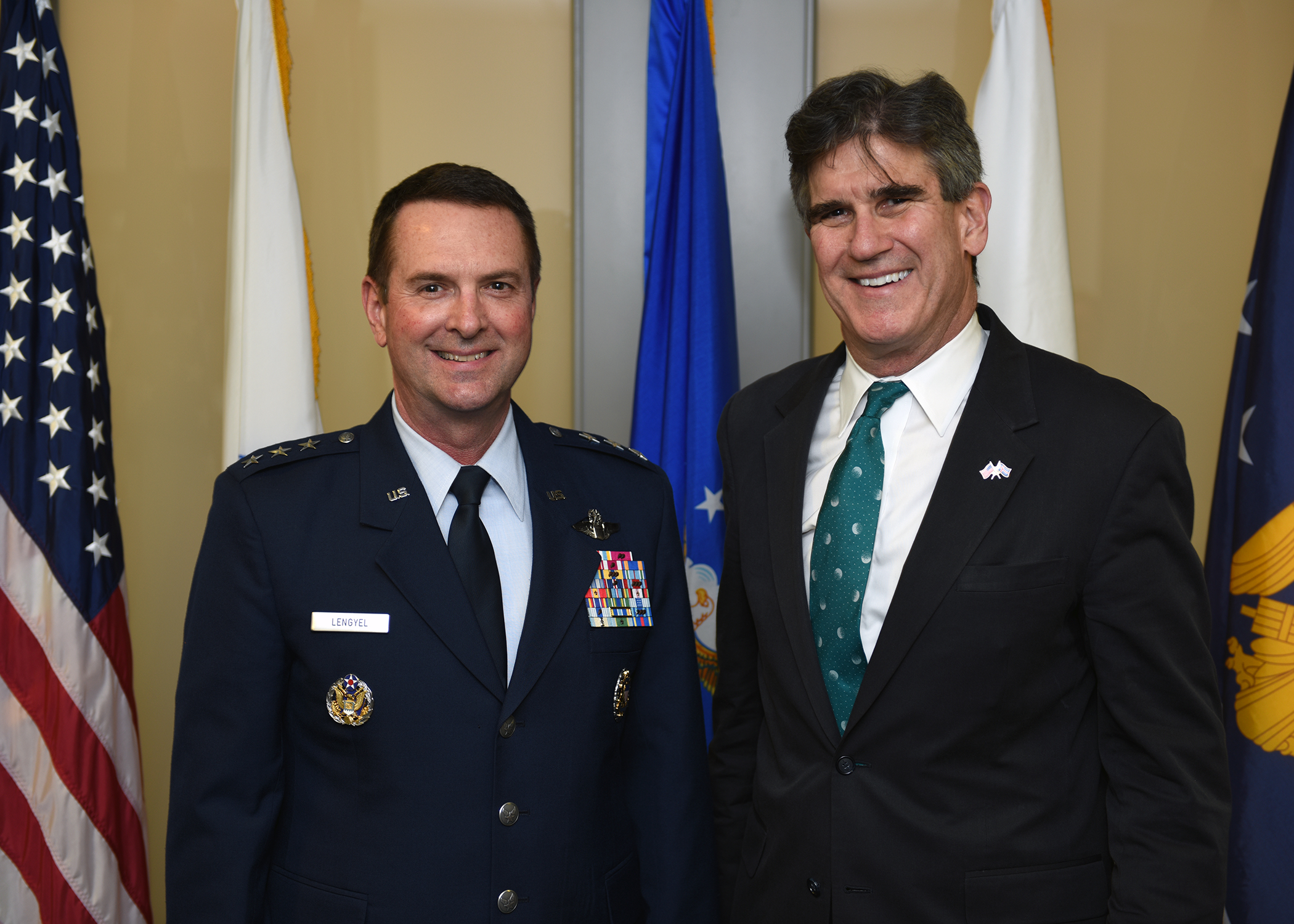
Lt. Gen. Joseph L. Lengyel poses with U.S. Ambassador to Iceland Robert C. Barber on 17 March 2016.

- Allied Joint Force Command Heidelberg (AFC Heidelberg), a three-star headquarters, was deactivated in April 2013. Lieutenant General Frederick B. Hodges, who became the inaugural commander of LANDCOM in December 2012, assumed the responsibilities of AFC Heidelberg and Allied Force Command Madrid upon their deactivations.
- The office of the Army Chief Information Officer/G-6 was split into a civilian Army CIO and deputy chief of staff for cyber (G-6) in August 2020. Lieutenant General Bruce T. Crawford became the last commissioned officer to hold the unified position, retiring on 11 August 2020. Major General John B. Morrison Jr. was confirmed for promotion to lieutenant general and became the first deputy chief of staff for cyber (G-6) in August 2020.
- The office of assistant chief of staff for installation management (ACSIM) (Note: Established in July 1993 by General Order-15, ACSIM was to advise the chief of staff of the Army on garrison and installation operations for effective integration with Army installations at the base level. Starting in 2006, the commanding general of the U.S. Army Installation Management Command was dual-hatted as ACSIM.) was separated from the office of commanding general of the U.S. Army Installation Management Command in November 2015. Lieutenant General David D. Halverson, the last officer to hold both positions simultaneously, relinquished command of IMCOM to Lieutenant General Kenneth R. Dahl.
- The deputy commanding general for futures of the U.S. Army Training and Doctrine Command, dual-hatted as director of the U.S. Army Capabilities Integration Center since 2003, (Note: known as the Futures Center until 2006) became the deputy commanding general for futures and concepts of the newly activated U.S. Army Futures Command in December 2018. ARCIC simultaneously became the Futures and Concepts Center. Lieutenant General Eric J. Wesley, the last deputy commanding general for futures retained the new office until 2020, when he was succeeded by Lieutenant General Scott McKean.

=== Senate confirmations ===
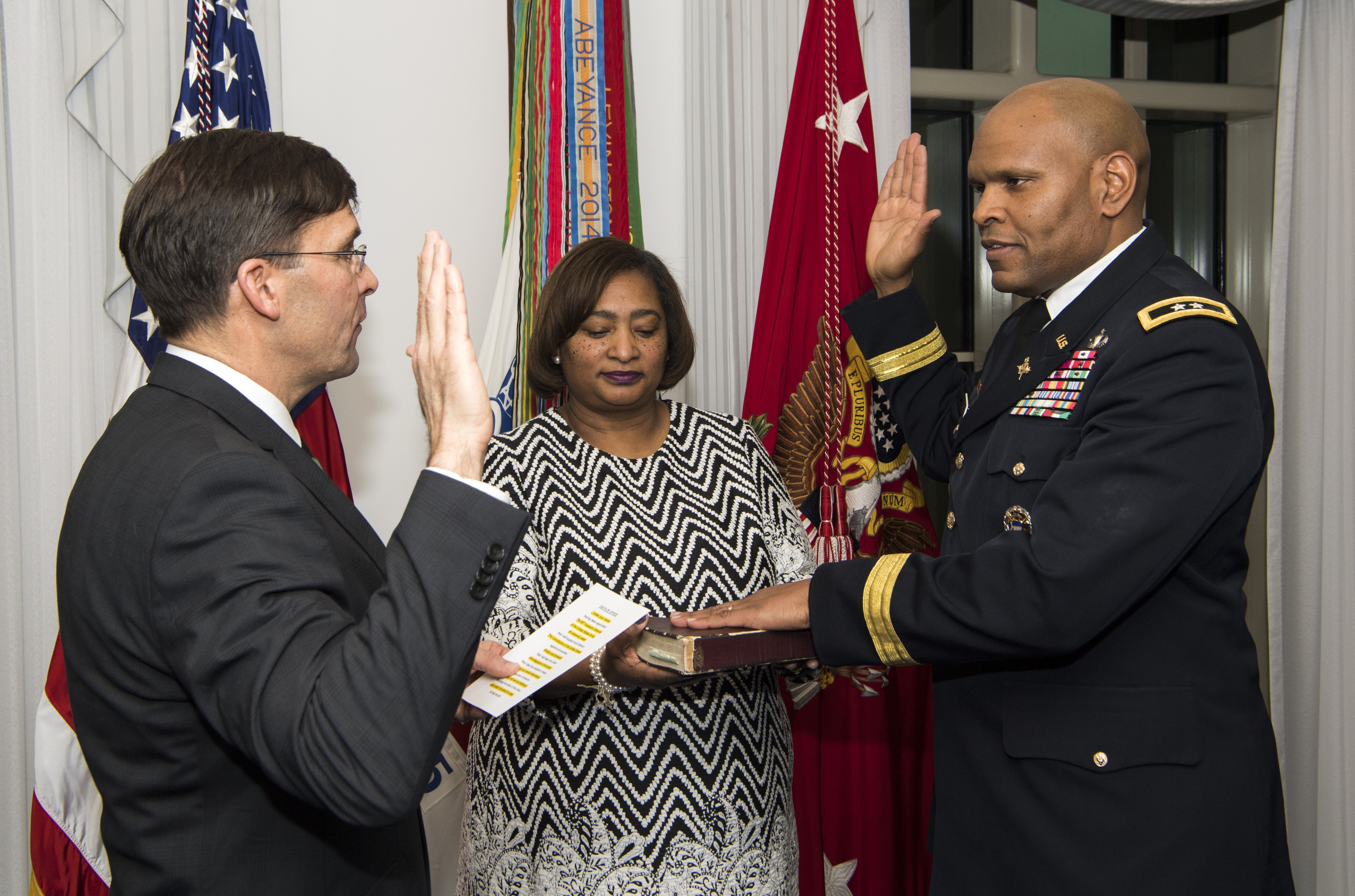
Secretary of the Army Mark Esper administers the reaffirmation oath to newly-promoted Lt. Gen. Leslie C. Smith on 9 February 2018.

Military nominations are considered by the Senate Armed Services Committee. While it is rare for three-star or four-star nominations to face even token opposition in the Senate, nominations that do face opposition due to controversy surrounding the nominee in question are typically withdrawn. Nominations that are not withdrawn are allowed to expire without action at the end of the legislative session.

- For example, the nomination of Major General Ryan F. Gonsalves for promotion to lieutenant general and assignment as commanding general of U.S. Army Europe was withdrawn in November 2017 after an investigation was launched into the general's inappropriate comment to a female Congressional staffer. As a result, Gonsalves was administratively reprimanded and retired in May 2018.

Additionally, events that take place after Senate confirmation may still delay or even prevent the nominee from assuming office.

- For example, Major General John G. Rossi, who had been confirmed for promotion to lieutenant general and assignment as the commanding general of U.S. Army Space and Missile Defense Command in April 2016 committed suicide two days before his scheduled promotion and assumption of command. As a result, the then incumbent commander of USASMDC, Lieutenant General David L. Mann, remained in command beyond customary term limits until another nominee, Major General James H. Dickinson was confirmed by the Senate.

== Legislative history ==
The following list of Congressional legislation includes all acts of Congress pertaining to appointments to the grade of lieutenant general in the United States Army from 2010 to 2019. (Note: Legislative history compiled from the U.S. Congress official website and U.S. Government Publishing Office official website.)

Each entry lists an act of Congress, its citation in the United States Statutes at Large or Public Law number, and a summary of the act's relevance, with officers affected by the act bracketed where applicable. Positions listed without reference to rank are assumed to be eligible for officers of three-star grade or higher.

List of legislation on appointments of lieutenant generals from 2010 to 2019
Legislation	Citation	Summary
Act of 7 January 2011 [Ike Skelton National Defense Authorization Act for Fiscal Year 2011]	124 Stat. 4209; 124 Stat. 4210	Authorized officers frocked to grade of lieutenant general or general to wear the insignia of that grade for up to 14 days before assuming position for which that grade is authorized.; Repealed 30-day waiting period following congressional notification before officers below grade of lieutenant general or vice admiral may wear insignia of the next higher grade.
Act of 31 December 2011 [National Defense Authorization Act for Fiscal Year 2012]	125 Stat. 1392	Reestablished position of vice chief of the National Guard Bureau (Note: redesignated director of the Joint Staff of the National Guard Bureau by NDAA 2005) and assigned officeholder statutory grade of lieutenant general.; Excluded vice chief of the National Guard Bureau from general and flag officer distribution limits.
Act of 23 December 2016 [National Defense Authorization Act for Fiscal Year 2017]	130 Stat. 2102; 130 Stat. 2103; 130 Stat. 2104; 130 Stat. 2105; 130 Stat. 2106; 130 Stat. 2107	Repealed authorization for the Chief of Staff to the President, if a general or flag officer of the United States Armed Forces, to be designated a position of importance and responsibility with grade of lieutenant general or vice admiral.; Removed statutory requirement for the director of the Department of Defense Test Resource Management Center, if a commissioned officer, to hold grade of lieutenant general or vice admiral.; Repealed statutory requirement for the director of the Missile Defense Agency, if a commissioned officer, to hold grade of lieutenant general or vice admiral.; Repealed statutory requirement for senior members of the United Nations Military Staff Committee to hold grade of lieutenant general or vice admiral.; Repealed statutory requirement for the directors of the Army National Guard and Air National Guard to hold grade of lieutenant general.; Repealed statutory requirement for chiefs of Army branches (chief of engineers, surgeon general, judge advocate general) to hold grade of lieutenant general.; Repealed statutory requirement for the chief of Army Reserve to hold grade of lieutenant general.
Act of 12 December 2017 [National Defense Authorization Act for Fiscal Year 2018]	131 Stat. 1374	Repealed statutory requirement for the principal military deputy to the assistant secretary of the Army for acquisition, technology, and logistics to hold grade of lieutenant general.
Act of 12 December 2019 [National Defense Authorization Act for Fiscal Year 2020]	133 Stat. 1346	Required advice and consent of the Senate on any proposal by the secretary of defense to increase the retired grade of any military officer through the reopening of the determination or certification of said officer's retired grade.

== See also ==
- Lieutenant general (United States)
- General officers in the United States
- List of active duty United States four-star officers
- List of active duty United States three-star officers
- List of United States Army four-star generals
- List of lieutenant generals in the United States Army before 1960
- List of United States Army lieutenant generals from 1990 to 1999
- List of United States Army lieutenant generals from 2000 to 2009
- List of United States Army lieutenant generals since 2020
- List of United States military leaders by rank
- Staff (military)
