= Halverson =

Halverson is a surname. Notable people with the surname include:

- Allison Halverson (born 1992), Armenian heptathlete
- Ben Halverson (1863–1933), American politician
- Bob Halverson (1937–2016), Australian politician
- C. A. Halverson (1886-1947), American politician
- Courtney Halverson (born 1989), American actress
- Dave Halverson, American video game journalist
- David D. Halverson (born 1957), American general
- Eliot Halverson (born 1990), American figure skater
- Jim Halverson, American politician
- Richard C. Halverson (1916–1995), American theologian
- Ronald T. Halverson (1936-2017), American politician
- Trevor Halverson (born 1971), Canadian ice hockey forward
