= Paul E. Funk =

United States Army general

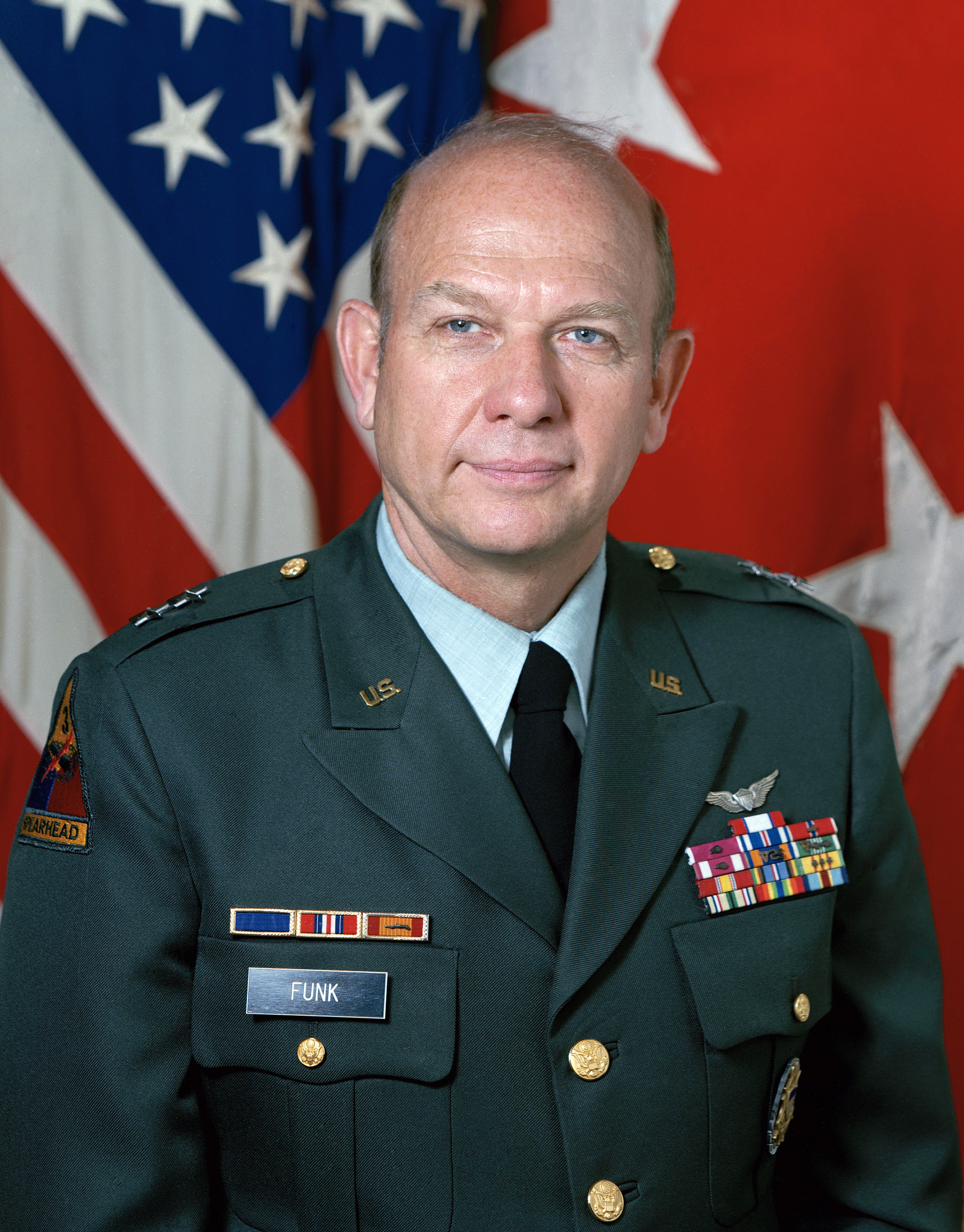
- Funk as a major general, 1991
- Born: March 10, 1940 (age 86); Roundup, Montana, U.S.
- Children: GEN Paul E. Funk II (son)
- Military career
- Allegiance: United States
- Branch: United States Army
- Service years: 1962–1996
- Rank: Lieutenant General
- Nickname: Butch
- Commands: III Corps; United States Army Armor Center; 3rd Armored Division; Fort Irwin National Training Center; 194th Armored Brigade; 5th Battalion, 33rd Armor Regiment; Troop A, 1st Squadron, 9th Cavalry Regiment
- Conflicts: Vietnam War; Gulf War; Operation Desert Shield; Operation Desert Storm
- Awards: Army Distinguished Service Medal (3); Defense Superior Service Medal; Legion of Merit (3); Distinguished Flying Cross; Bronze Star Medal (3); Meritorious Service Medal (4); Air Medal (26)

Paul Edward Funk (born March 10, 1940) is a retired United States Army lieutenant general who served as Commanding General, III Corps from 1993 to 1995. He is also the father of Paul E. Funk II. He was previously Commanding General, U.S. Army Armor Center and Fort Knox from 1992 to 1993 and Commanding General, 3rd Armored Division during the Gulf War from 1990 to 1991.

== Early life and education ==
Born in 1940, Funk was raised in Montana. He attended Montana State University (MSU), graduating with a B.S. degree in animal science, as well as the Armed Forces Staff College and United States Army War College. Funk later earned a master's degree in psychological counseling and a Ed.D. degree, both from Montana State. His March 1973 doctoral thesis was entitled A descriptive analysis of selected intrapersonal characteristics of drug abusers.

== Military career ==
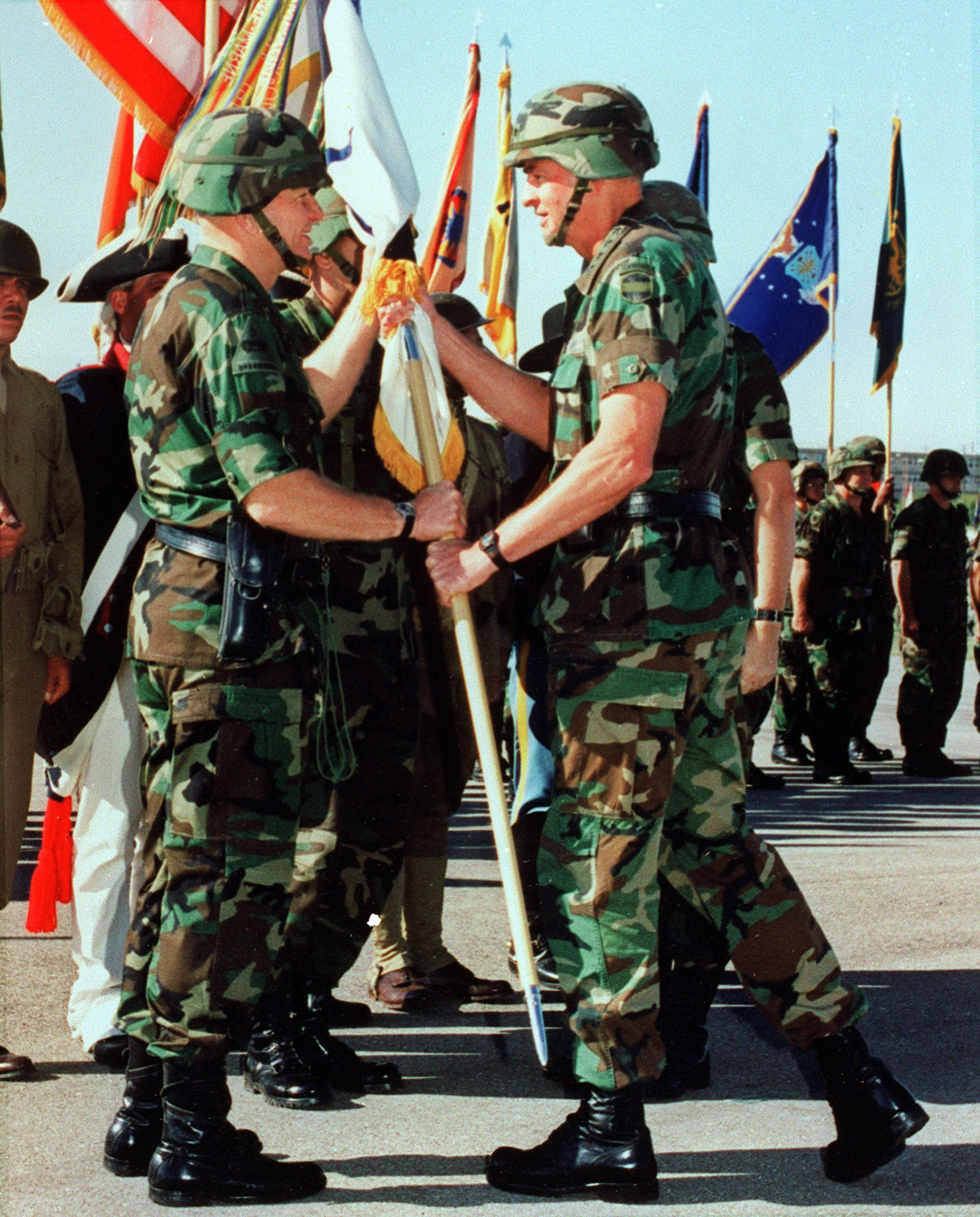
Funk (left) assumes command of III Corps on October 26, 1993

Funk entered the Army via the ROTC program at Montana State University. Originally a cavalry officer, Funk transferred to the Armor branch when the Cavalry separated into aviation and armored components in 1983. Departing active duty after completing his official two-year commitment, he rejoined within six months, receiving assignment to Germany. He was executive officer and then commander of Apache Troop, 1st Squadron, 9th Cavalry, 1st Cavalry Division during the Vietnam War in 1969.

His assignments include being Commanding General, National Training Center and Fort Irwin; Assistant Division Commander, 9th Infantry Division; Commander, 194th Separate Armored Brigade; Vice Director of Operations, Joint Staff and Assistant Commandant, United States Army Armor School. He was confirmed for promotion to brigadier general on July 31, 1985.

Funk served as commanding general of the 3rd Armored Division from December 1990 to April 1991. In this capacity, he became the first commander to lead the division in combat since World War II, during Operation Desert Shield and Operation Desert Storm in Kuwait. Afterwards, he commanded the United States Army Armor Center and Fort Knox from June 1992 to October 1993.

Funk was confirmed by the Senate for promotion to lieutenant general on October 25, 1993, effective November 1, 1993. His final assignment was as commanding general of III Corps from October 1993 to December 1995. His retirement as a lieutenant general was approved on December 5, 1995, with an official retirement date of January 1, 1996.

His military honors include the Army Distinguished Service Medal (with two oak leaf clusters), Defense Superior Service Medal, Legion of Merit (with two oak leaf clusters) and Distinguished Flying Cross.

== Personal life and family ==
Funk is the son of Paul Golberg Funk and LaVerna Christina (Charlton) Funk. He has two brothers and a sister. He married Sheila Ann "Danny" Brown on July 21, 1961, in Gallatin County, Montana.

Funk's pastime is rearing Hereford cattle. In his youth, he owned a small herd of them while employed by the ES Bar Ranch near Roundup (his place of birth), but was forced to sell them to fund his education at Montana State. He returned to the cattle trade upon retirement from the Army, purchasing his first Hereford bull in 1997.

His son, Paul E. Funk II, is a retired Army four-star general who commanded III Corps from 2017 to 2019, making them the first father-son duo to lead the unit. Through his son's wife, Elizabeth Yeosock, he is related to Army lieutenant general John J. Yeosock.
