= Joint Functional Component Command for Integrated Missile Defense =

Part of United States Space Command

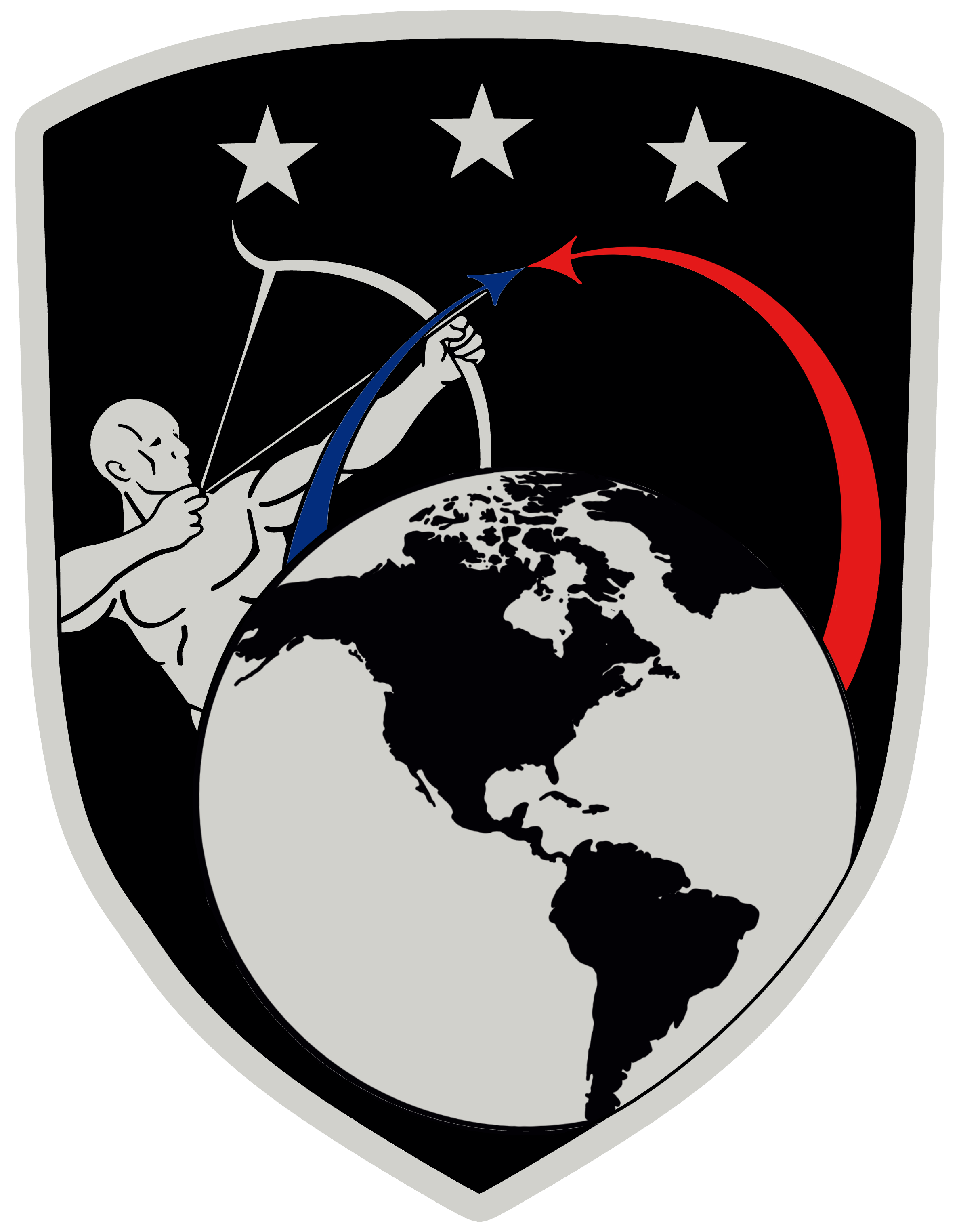
Seal of the Joint Functional Component Command for Integrated Missile Defense

Joint Functional Component Command for Integrated Missile Defense (JFCC IMD) is a component of United States Space Command (USSPACECOM). The current commander is Army Lieutenant General Sean A. Gainey. The current senior enlisted leader is Space Force Chief Master Sergeant Daniel L. Scheu.

== Mission ==
JFCC IMD was established to optimize planning, execution and force management, as directed by HQ USSPACECOM, of deterring attacks against the United States, its territories, possessions and bases. In addition, JFCC IMD would employ appropriate forces, should deterrence fail, and the associated mission of planning, integrating and coordinating global missile defense operations and support for missile defense.

== Background ==
Former Seal of the Joint Functional Component Command for Integrated Missile Defense

JFCC IMD originated in the Implemented Directive issued by the Commander, United States Strategic Command (USSTRATCOM) in January 2005. The JFCCs were formed to further operationalize USSTRATCOM missions and allow the Headquarters, USSTRATCOM to focus on strategic-level integration and advocacy. JFCC IMD is responsible for planning and coordinating global operations and support for integrated missile defense. The JFCC IMD will conduct operational and tactical level planning and day-to-day employment of assigned and attached missile defense forces for USSTRATCOM integrated missile defense operations, to include integrated missile defense planning and operational support responsibilities with other combatant commands, the Missile Defense Agency and joint service components. HQ USSTRATCOM will retain the responsibility for advocacy of system-level missile defense capabilities, integration of missile defense into strategic level planning and military assessments of missile defense capabilities. Strategic Level Intelligence support will be provided by Defense Intelligence Agency’s Joint Intelligence Operations Center.

In 2023, JFCC IMD was transferred to the United States Space Command.

== Current operations ==
JFCC-IMD is responsible for USSPACECOM integrated missile defense planning and operational support to include operational and tactical level plan development, force execution and day-to-day management of assigned and attached missile defense forces. JFCC IMD is co-located with MDA at Schriever SFB. Current operation areas include:

- Coordinate BMDS development and operational activity through the asset management process in conjunction with other applicable commands, agencies and organizations.
- Focal point for global situational awareness of missile defense operations
- Maintain visibility of all global missile defense logistics to aid the Commander and staff in planning and decision making
- Coordinate and maintain intelligence, as necessary, to support missile defense components.
- Provide operational oversight for the Command, Control, Battle Management and Communications system.
- Develop course of action recommendations to optimize global integrated missile defense operations, address operational resource conflicts, operational seams and vulnerabilities, and minimize operational risk for missile defense capabilities.
- Plan and coordinate BMDS objectives for Joint and Combatant Command exercises, wargames and experiments.

The Joint Ballistic Missile Defense Training and Education Center (JBTEC) is now a Joint Center of Excellence. JBTEC is operated by JFCC IMD at Schriever Space Force Base, Colorado. Established as part of the Missile Defense Agency in 2005, it was transferred to JFCC IMD in 2013.

== Resources ==
- U.S. Space and Missile Defense Command's 2024 Global Defender

== See also ==
- U.S. Army Space and Missile Defense Command
