= Paul E. Funk II =

U.S. Army general (born 1962)

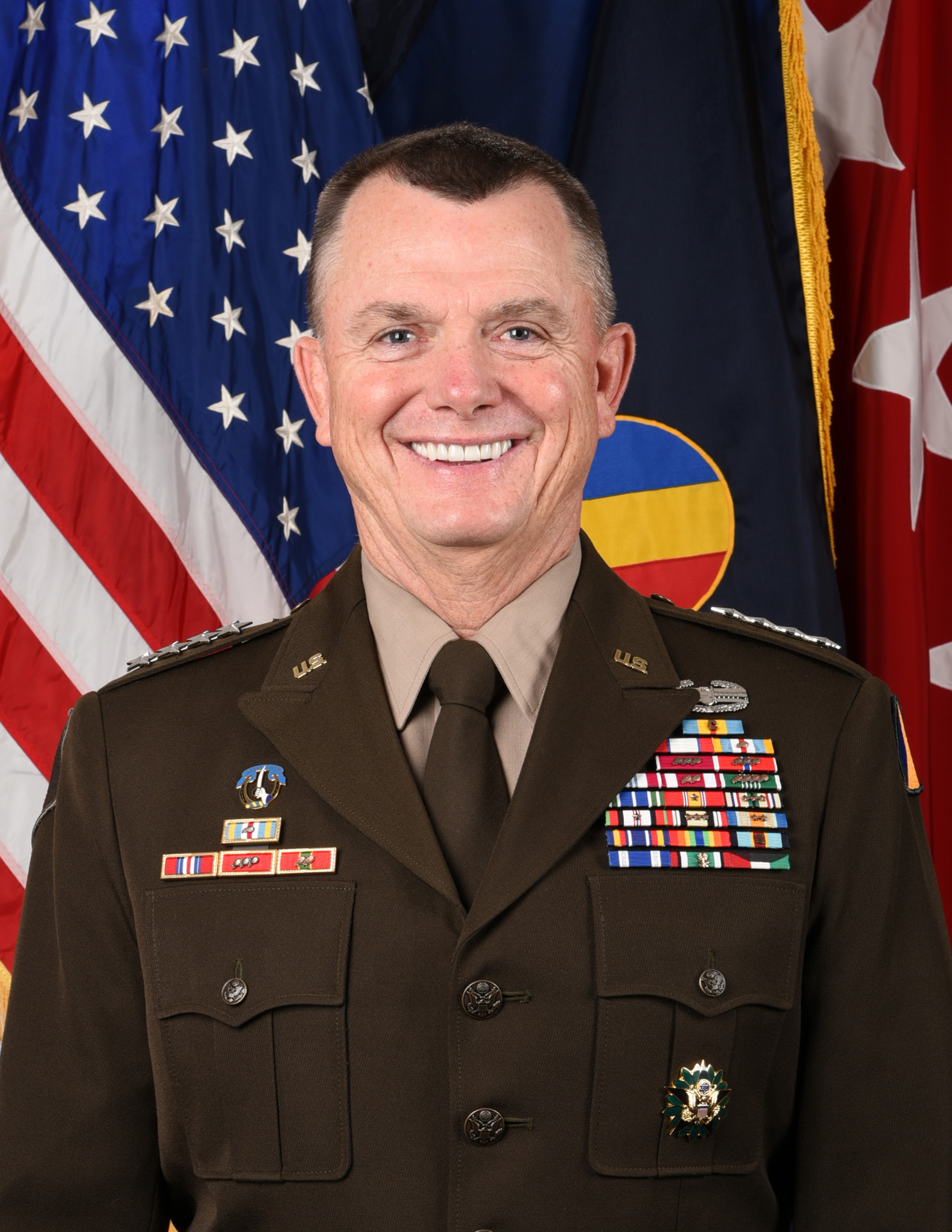
- Funk in 2019
- Born: 1962 (age 63–64); Fort Hood, Texas, United States
- Spouse: Elizabeth Yeoseck
- Children: 3
- Relatives: LTG Paul E. Funk (father); LTG John J. Yeosock (father-in-law)
- Military career
- Allegiance: United States
- Branch: United States Army
- Service years: 1984–2022
- Rank: General
- Commands: Training and Doctrine Command; III Corps; Combined Joint Task Force – Operation Inherent Resolve; 1st Infantry Division; 1st Brigade Combat Team, 1st Cavalry Division
- Conflicts: Gulf War; Operation Desert Shield; Iraq War; War in Afghanistan; Operation Inherent Resolve
- Awards: Defense Distinguished Service Medal with "C" device Army Distinguished Service Medal (2); Defense Superior Service Medal (2); Legion of Merit (4); Bronze Star Medal (4)

Paul Edward Funk II (born 1962) is a retired four-star general in the United States Army who last served as the commanding officer of the Army Training and Doctrine Command. He previously served as the 60th Commanding General of III Corps and Fort Hood, Texas, and as the Commanding General, Combined Joint Task Force – Operation Inherent Resolve. Funk was born at Fort Hood, Texas, graduated from Fort Knox High School, and was commissioned an Armor Officer through ROTC upon graduation from Montana State University in 1984. His first assignments saw him serve in a variety of Armor and Cavalry roles to include Tank Platoon Leader, Company Executive Officer, Squadron Commander of 1st Squadron, 7th Cavalry Regiment and Brigade Commander of 1st Brigade Combat Team, 1st Cavalry Division located at Fort Hood.

== Personal life and education ==
Funk is the son of Lieutenant General Paul E. Funk I and is married to the former Elizabeth Yeosock, daughter of Lieutenant General John J. Yeosock. They have three children and one grandson.

Funk holds a bachelor's degree in speech communications from Montana State University and a Master of Science in Administration from Central Michigan University. He is also a graduate of the Armor Basic Officer Leaders and Advanced Courses, and the Command and General Staff College at Fort Leavenworth. He completed his Senior Service College as a fellow at the Institute of Advanced Technology, University of Texas at Austin.

== Assignments ==
1. A Company, 2nd Battalion, 32nd Armor Regiment, 1st Brigade, 3rd Armored Division in Kirchgöns, Germany
2. Headquarters and Headquarters Company, 4th Battalion, 67th Armor Regiment, 3rd Brigade, 3rd Armored Division in Friedberg, Germany
3. 1st Squadron, 7th Cavalry Regiment (GARRYOWEN), 4th Brigade, 1st Cavalry Division at Fort Hood, Texas
4. 1st Brigade Combat Team (IRONHORSE), 1st Cavalry Division at Fort Hood, Texas
5. 1st Infantry Division (Big Red One) at Fort Riley, Kansas

== Joint assignments ==
1. Chief, Joint Exercise Section J-37, North American Aerospace Defense Command (NORAD), U.S. Space Command at Peterson Air Force Base, Colorado
2. Deputy Commanding General (Maneuver), Combined Joint Task Force-1 in Afghanistan
3. Commander, Combined Joint Forces Land Component Command-Iraq in Baghdad, Iraq

== Operational assignments ==
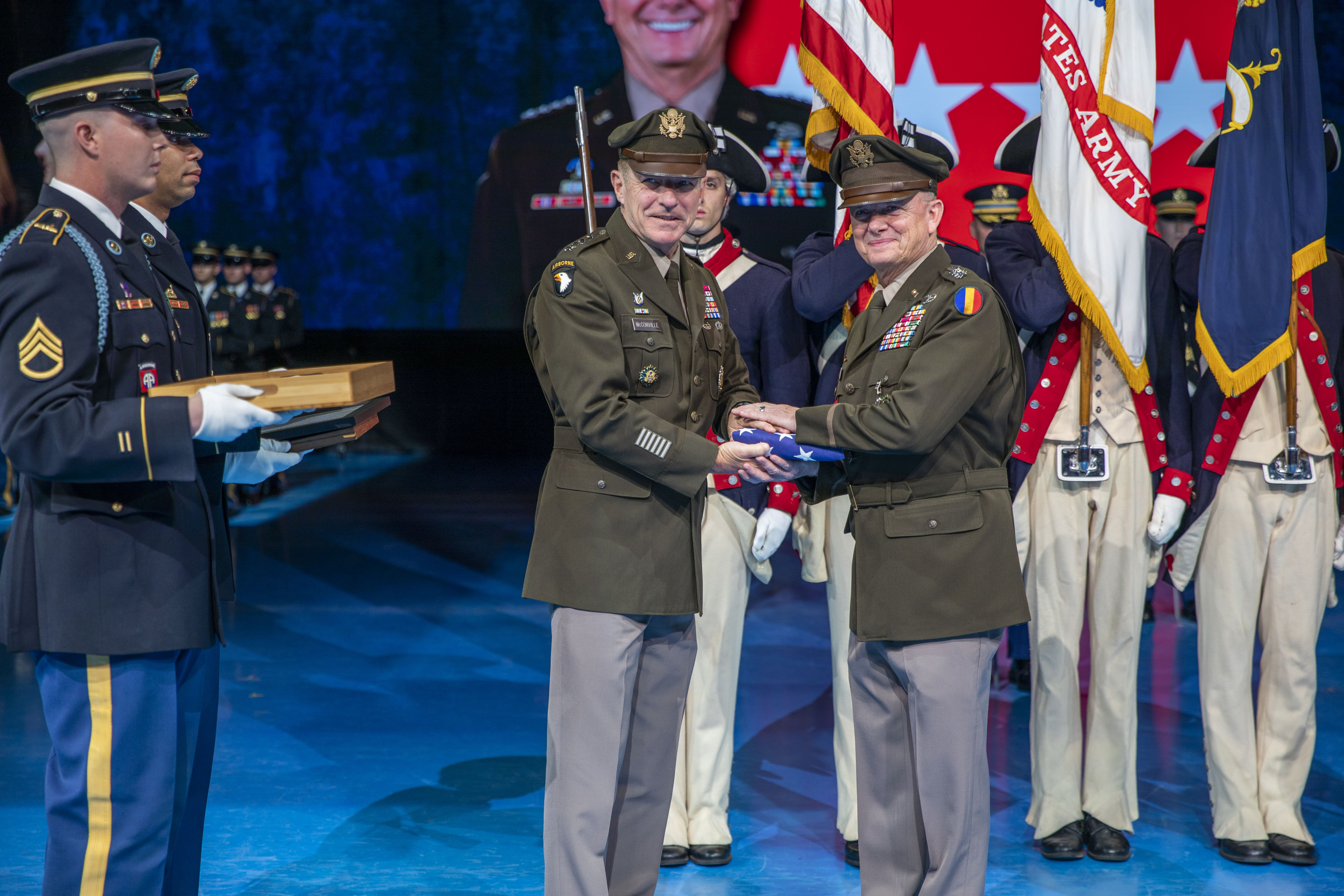
Funk is presented with his command flag by Army chief of staff General James C. McConville at his retirement ceremony on 9 September 2022.

1. Observer Controller with the Live Fire Team (Dragons) at the National Training Center, Fort Irwin, California
2. Squadron Operations Officer of 1st Squadron, 3rd Armored Cavalry Regiment at Fort Carson, Colorado
3. Regimental Operations Officer, 3rd Armored Cavalry Regiment at Fort Carson, Colorado
4. Division Operations Officer, 1st Cavalry Division at Fort Hood, Texas
5. Chief of Staff, III Corps at Fort Hood, Texas
6. Deputy Commanding General at the Combined Arms Center for Training at Fort Leavenworth, Kansas
7. Deputy Commanding General (Maneuver), 1st Infantry Division at Fort Riley, Kansas
8. Assistant Deputy Chief of Staff, G-3/5/7, U.S. Army in Washington, D.C.

Funk has deployed five times and has led soldiers in combat during Operations Desert Shield and Desert Storm, twice in Operation Iraqi Freedom, in Operation Enduring Freedom, and in Operation Inherent Resolve. Funk was Commanding General, Combined Joint Task Force – Operation Inherent Resolve from 2017 to 2018.

== Awards and decorations ==
Combat Action Badge
Army Staff Identification Badge
1st Infantry Division Combat Service Identification Badge
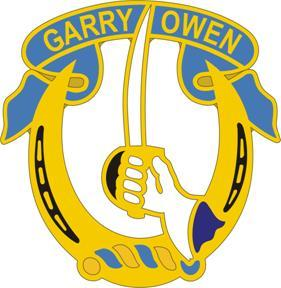
7th Cavalry Regiment Distinctive Unit Insignia
13 Overseas Service Bars

Defense Distinguished Service Medal with "C" device
Army Distinguished Service Medal with one bronze oak leaf cluster
Defense Superior Service Medal with oak leaf cluster
Legion of Merit with three oak leaf clusters
Bronze Star with three oak leaf clusters
Defense Meritorious Service Medal
Meritorious Service Medal with two oak leaf clusters
Army Commendation Medal with four oak leaf clusters
Army Achievement Medal
Joint Meritorious Unit Award with oak leaf cluster
Valorous Unit Award
Meritorious Unit Commendation with three oak leaf clusters
Superior Unit Award with two oak leaf clusters
National Defense Service Medal with one bronze service star
Southwest Asia Service Medal with three service stars
Afghanistan Campaign Medal with service star
Iraq Campaign Medal with three service stars
Inherent Resolve Campaign Medal with two service stars
Global War on Terrorism Service Medal
Army Service Ribbon
Army Overseas Service Ribbon with bronze award numeral 5
NATO Medal for service with ISAF
Kuwait Liberation Medal (Saudi Arabia)
Kuwait Liberation Medal (Kuwait)

== Education ==
Funk holds a Bachelor of Arts in Speech Communications from Montana State University and a Master of Science in Administration from Central Michigan University. He is a graduate of the Armor Officer Basic and Advanced Courses, the Command and General Staff College, and completed his Senior Service College as a fellow attending the Institute of Advanced Technology at the University of Texas at Austin. He is a member of the Sigma Chi fraternity.

Military offices
Preceded by William C. Mayville Jr.	Commanding General, 1st Infantry Division; 2013–2015	Succeeded by Wayne W. Grigsby Jr.
Preceded by Sean MacFarland	Commanding General, III Corps; 2017–2019	Succeeded by Robert P. White
Preceded by Stephen J. Townsend	Commanding General, Combined Joint Task Force - Operation Inherent Resolve; 2017–2018	Succeeded by Paul LaCamera
Preceded by Stephen J. Townsend	Commanding General, United States Army Training and Doctrine Command; 2019–2022	Succeeded by Gary Brito
