= Eric J. Wesley =

American general (born 1964)

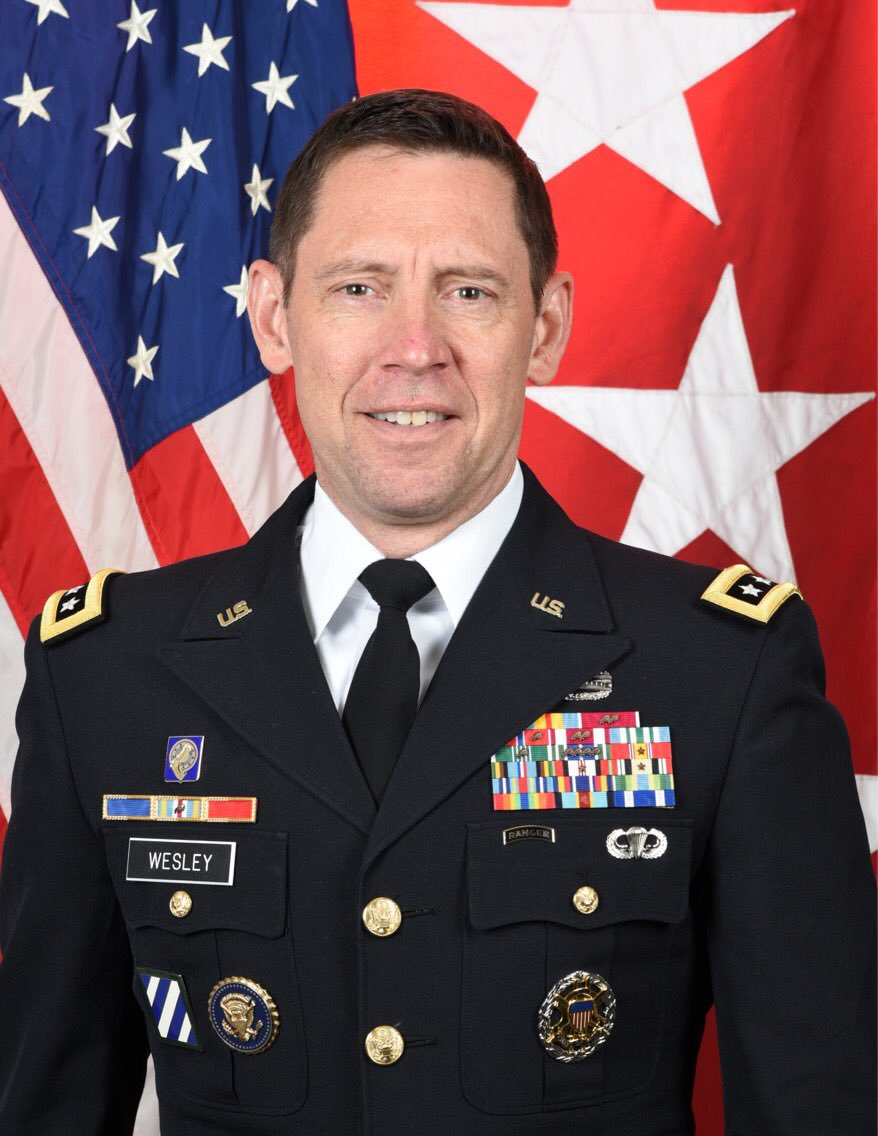
- Lieutenant General Eric J. Wesley in Army Service Uniform
- Born: 1964 (age 61–62); Yorba Linda, California, U.S.
- Military career
- Allegiance: United States
- Branch: United States Army
- Service years: 1986–2020
- Rank: Lieutenant General
- Commands: Fort Benning; 1st Brigade Combat Team, 1st Infantry Division; 1st Tank Battalion, 13th Armor Regiment
- Conflicts: War in Afghanistan; Iraq War
- Awards: Army Distinguished Service Medal (2); Defense Superior Service Medal; Legion of Merit (3)

Eric J. Wesley (born 1964) is an American retired general and the CEO of a start up software company specializing in agentic AI systems that autonomously manage and optimize operations at the edge. Wesley is a former United States Army Lieutenant General who retired from the U.S. Army on September 1, 2020. He serves on a number of boards and advisory positions for combat vehicle development, advanced nuclear power, and Joint All Domain Command and Control. He is a public speaker and a member of the Council on Foreign Relations.

== Early life ==
The son of Donna and Richard Wesley, an aerospace engineer, Eric John Wesley grew up in Yorba Linda, California, where he was a student and water polo player. He attended Troy High School in Fullerton, California and was interested in military service from an early age. Wesley commissioned as an armor lieutenant from the United States Military Academy at West Point in 1986. He retired from the Army September 1, 2020.

== Junior and field officer career ==
Wesley's first assignments included tank platoon leader, scout platoon leader, and battalion logistics officer for 2nd Battalion, 70th Armor Regiment, of the 1st Armored Division in Wiesbaden, Germany. He then commanded a tank company in 1st Battalion, 34th Armor, 1st Infantry Division, Fort Riley, Kansas until December 1993. For the next few years, he was assigned to the United States Army's Special Operations Command where he was deployed in support of Operations Joint Guard and Joint Endeavor in Bosnia-Herzegovina.

In 1998, Wesley was assigned to the 2nd Brigade of the 3rd Infantry Division at Fort Stewart, Georgia, where he held several leadership positions including battalion and brigade operations officer and brigade executive officer. Four years later, he deployed with the same brigade to Operation Desert Spring in Kuwait and then, in 2003, his brigade led the United States Army's 3rd Infantry Division's invasion into Baghdad, Iraq in what would later be called Operation Iraqi Freedom. His leadership roles in the invasion were captured in books written by embedded journalists including David Zucchino's book "Thunder Run," an account of the division's strike into Baghdad and Bing West's "No True Glory: A Frontline Account of the Battle for Fallujah". Upon redeployment, he led the effort to move the 3rd Infantry Division to a modular organization.

As a lieutenant colonel, Wesley returned to Fort Riley, Kansas in June 2004 and assumed command of the 1st Tank Battalion, 13th Armor Regiment. He deployed the "13th Tank" back to Baghdad, Iraq and conducted combat operations there from January 2005 to January 2006. Upon his redeployment back to Fort Riley, he relinquished command and became the operations officer of the 1st Infantry Division until June 2007. Following this command from August until June 2008, he attended the National War College at Fort Lesley J. McNair, Washington, D.C. and then returned to the "Big Red One" at Fort Riley, Kansas and assumed command of the 1st Brigade Combat Team, 1st Infantry Division.

After finishing brigade command Wesley deployed to Kabul, Afghanistan and served as the chief of current plans for the International Security Assistance Force in support of Operation Enduring Freedom. Following this deployment, Wesley served from August 2011 through to June 2013 in the White House on the National Security Council as the Director for Afghanistan and Pakistan. In this capacity, he led inter-agency efforts to develop policy including a decreasing posture of forces in Afghanistan and subsequently deployed back to Afghanistan to be the director for future plans in ISAF's joint command.

== General officer ==
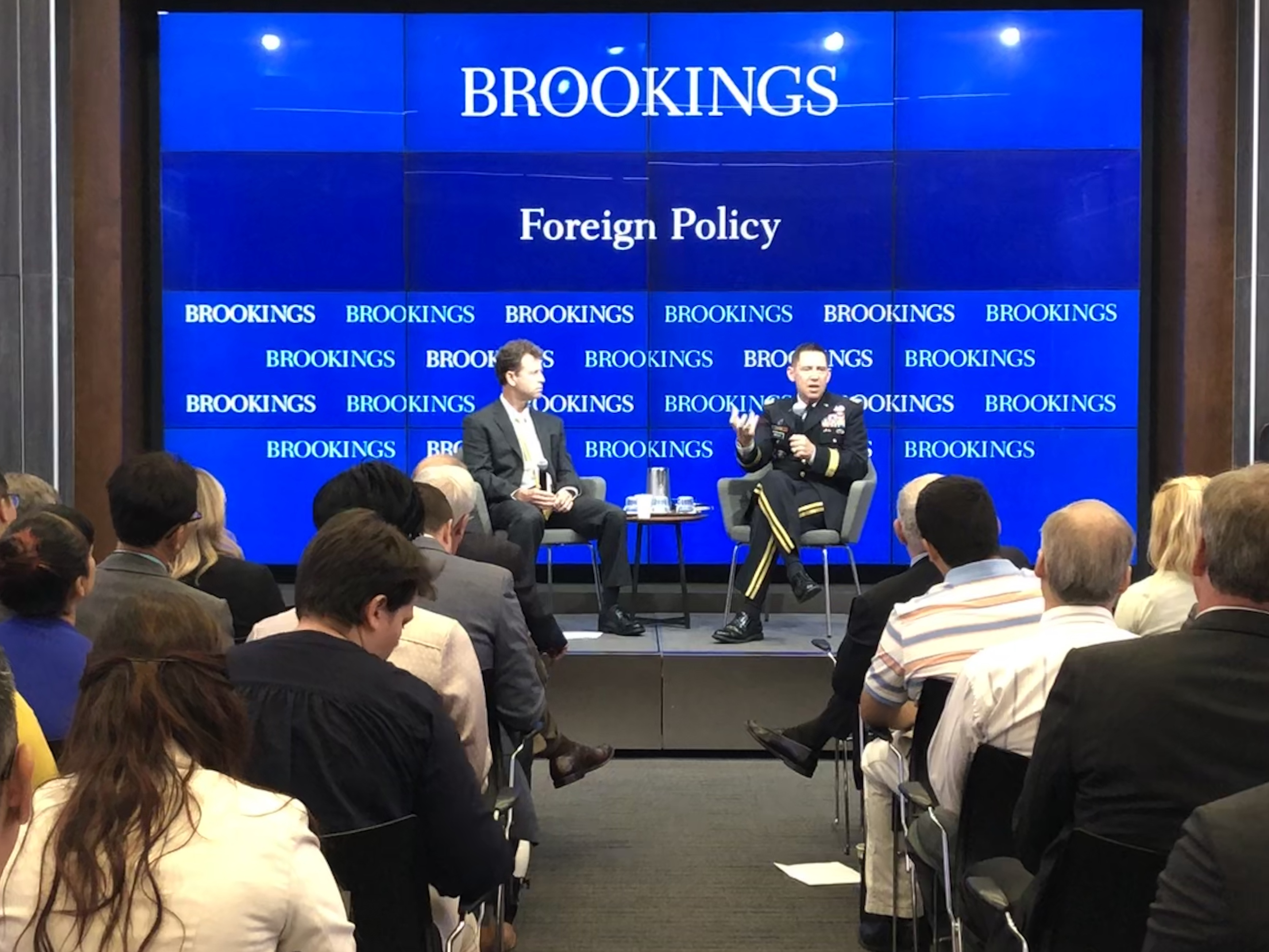
Wesley at the Brookings Institution with foreign policy expert and fellow Michael E. O'Hanlon, speaking about Army modernization on September 24, 2019

Wesley was promoted to brigadier general in 2014 while in Kabul, Afghanistan. While in this role, he reorganized the numbers of deployed personnel in the country under the direction of General Joseph Dunford and Milley. Subsequently selected to serve as the Deputy Commanding General for Support for the 1st Infantry Division, Wesley returned to Fort Riley, Kansas in September 2014 where he was the acting senior mission commander at the base while the division was deployed.

Following completion of this assignment Wesley was assigned to the Pentagon as the deputy director for program analysis and evaluation for the Army's G8, where he led the Army's efforts to improve Army acquisition.

In January 2017, Wesley was nominated for promotion to the rank of major general. He was assigned as the Commanding General, United States Army Maneuver Center of Excellence and Fort Benning, Georgia, where he oversaw the initial integration of women into infantry and armor branches and the Army's Ranger School. While there he led the effort to reorganize the Army's maneuver force into what would later become a multi-domain capable force

Subsequently, on April 12, 2018, Wesley was nominated for a third star and promoted to the rank of lieutenant general, assuming the responsibilities as Director of Army Capabilities Integration Center (ARCIC) and deputy commanding general of United States Army Training and Doctrine Command. Wesley was then tapped to lead the task force responsible for standing up the Army's new four-star command in Austin, Texas – Army Futures Command while simultaneously transitioning the Army's Capabilities Integration Center (ARCIC), headquartered at Fort Eustis, Virginia, from United States Army Training and Doctrine Command to Army Futures Command

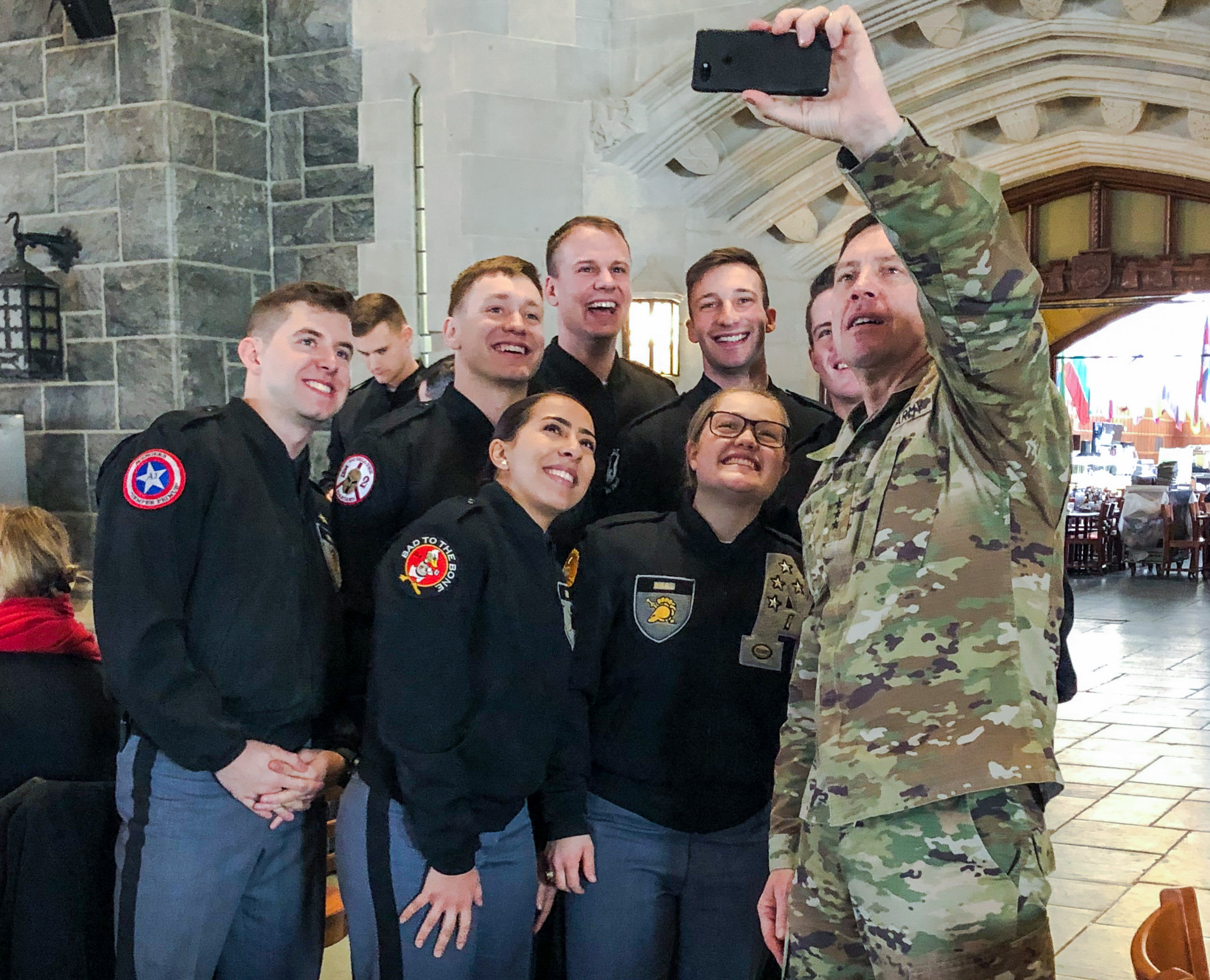
Wesley takes a photo with United States Military Academy cadets after a discussion on Multi-Domain Operations

As the Deputy Commanding General of Army Futures Command and head of its Futures and Concepts Center, headquartered at Joint Base Langley Eustis in Virginia, Wesley led the Army's effort to accelerate the development of the Army's new war fighting concept – Multi Domain Operations – the most fundamental rewrite of an operational concept since AirLand Battle was published in 1982. He was an Army advocate of adapting modernization in accordance with this new concept and actively communicates the precepts with think tanks, academia, heads of other armies, and policy makers. By September 2020 a Joint exercise against cruise missile surrogates demonstrated AI-based kill chains which can be formulated in seconds, and a precision fires kill of a cruise missile surrogate by an Army howitzer at White Sands Missile Range.

== Personal life ==
Wesley is married to Cynthia Wesley and they have three children. He has earned masters degrees from the National War College (National Security and Strategic studies) and Troy University (International relations).

== Awards and decorations ==
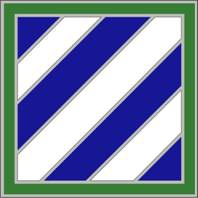
Combat Action Badge
Ranger tab
Basic Parachutist Badge
Joint Chiefs of Staff Identification Badge
Presidential Service Badge
3rd Infantry Division Combat Service Identification Badge
34th Armor Regiment Distinctive Unit Insignia
9 Overseas Service Bars

Army Distinguished Service Medal with one bronze oak leaf cluster
Defense Superior Service Medal
Legion of Merit with two oak leaf clusters
Bronze Star Medal with Valor device and oak leaf cluster
Meritorious Service Medal with two oak leaf clusters
Joint Service Commendation Medal
Army Commendation Medal with oak leaf cluster
Army Achievement Medal with four oak leaf clusters
Army Presidential Unit Citation
Joint Meritorious Unit Award with oak leaf cluster
Meritorious Unit Commendation
National Defense Service Medal with one bronze service star
Armed Forces Expeditionary Medal
Afghanistan Campaign Medal with service star
Iraq Campaign Medal with service star
Global War on Terrorism Expeditionary Medal
Global War on Terrorism Service Medal
Armed Forces Service Medal
Army Service Ribbon
Army Overseas Service Ribbon with bronze award numeral 4
NATO Medal for service with ISAF
