= David D. Halverson =

United States Army general

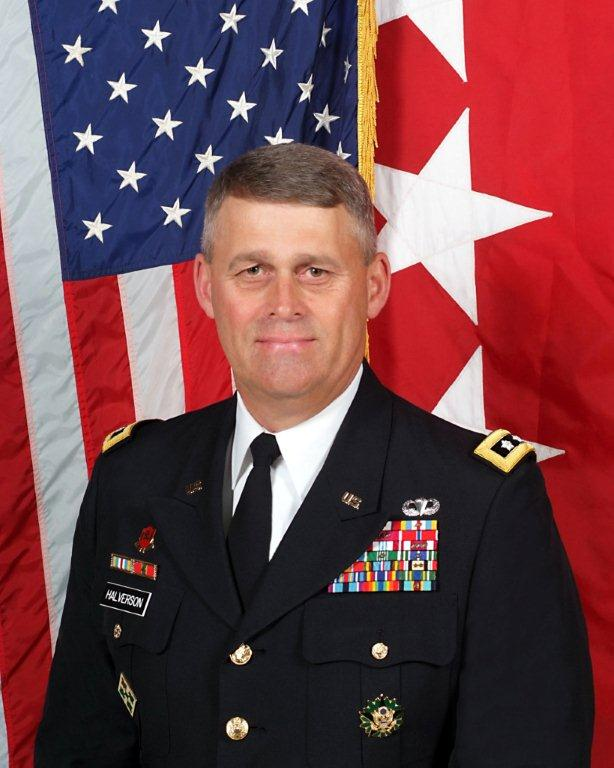
- Lieutenant General Halverson, U.S. Army
- Born: August 13, 1957 (age 69); Minnesota, U.S.
- Military career
- Allegiance: United States of America
- Branch: United States Army
- Service years: 1979–2016
- Rank: Lieutenant General
- Conflicts: Operation Enduring Freedom; Operation Iraqi Freedom

LTG David Dale Halverson (born August 13, 1957) assumed the duties of the commanding general of the U.S. Army Installation Management Command and Assistant Chief of Staff for Installation Management April 8, 2014. Previously, he served as deputy commanding general/chief of staff, U.S. Army Training and Doctrine Command TRADOC. Halverson assumed duties as the Deputy Commanding General/Chief of Staff, U.S. Army Training and Doctrine Command on 4 June 2012.

== Education ==
Born in Minnesota and raised in Babbitt, Minnesota, Halverson graduated from the United States Military Academy and was commissioned a Second Lieutenant in the Field Artillery in June 1979. He attended the U.S. Naval Postgraduate School in Monterey, California, where he was awarded a Master of Science degree in Operations Research and Systems Analysis in 1989 with a thesis entitled Enlistment Motivators for High Quality Recruits in the Army Reserve. He is a graduate of the Armed Forces Staff College, Army War College and the British Higher Command and Staff Course.

== Military career ==
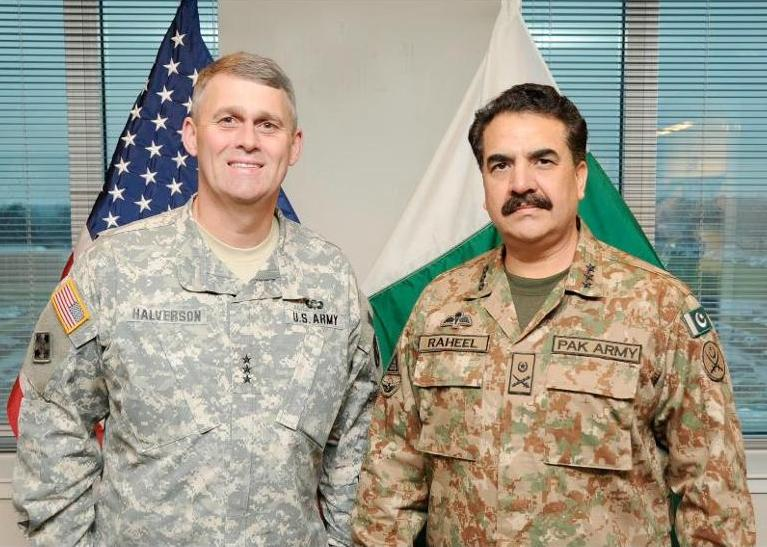
18 March 2013 - Lt. Gen. David Halverson with IG Training & Evaluation GHQ Lt. Gen. Raheel Sharif(Now Gen. Raheel Sharif) at TRADOC Headquarters

Halverson's first duty assignment was in the 1st Cavalry Division, Fort Hood, Texas in 1979 where he served as a Battalion Reconnaissance Officer, Battery Fire Direction and Executive Officer and Battalion Adjutant. Since then, Halverson has served in various staff and leadership positions including command at every level from Battery to Post Command. His commands include A Battery, 6th Battalion, 29th Field Artillery, 8th Infantry Division; 2nd Battalion, 82nd Field Artillery, 1st Cavalry Division; 2nd Infantry Division Artillery, Operational Test Command, and Commanding General, Fires Center of Excellence and Fort Sill.

Halverson retired from active duty on June 30, 2016.

== Promotions ==
Rank	Date
Lieutenant General	
Major General	
Brigadier General	
Colonel	
Lieutenant Colonel	
Major	
Captain	
First Lieutenant	
Second Lieutenant	June, 1979

== Awards and decorations ==
=== Badges ===
Parachutist Badge
Army Staff Identification Badge

=== Medals and ribbons ===
Distinguished Service Medal with three oak leaf clusters
Defense Superior Service Medal (with oak leaf cluster)
Legion of Merit (with 4 oak leaf clusters)
Bronze Star
Defense Meritorious Service Medal
Meritorious Service Medal (with 3 oak leaf clusters)
Joint Service Commendation Medal
Army Commendation Medal
Army Achievement Medal (with oak leaf cluster)
Armed Forces Expeditionary Medal
Humanitarian Service Medal
Joint Meritorious Unit Award
Korea Defense Service Medal
Global War on Terrorism Service Medal
