= John J. Yeosock =

United States Army general

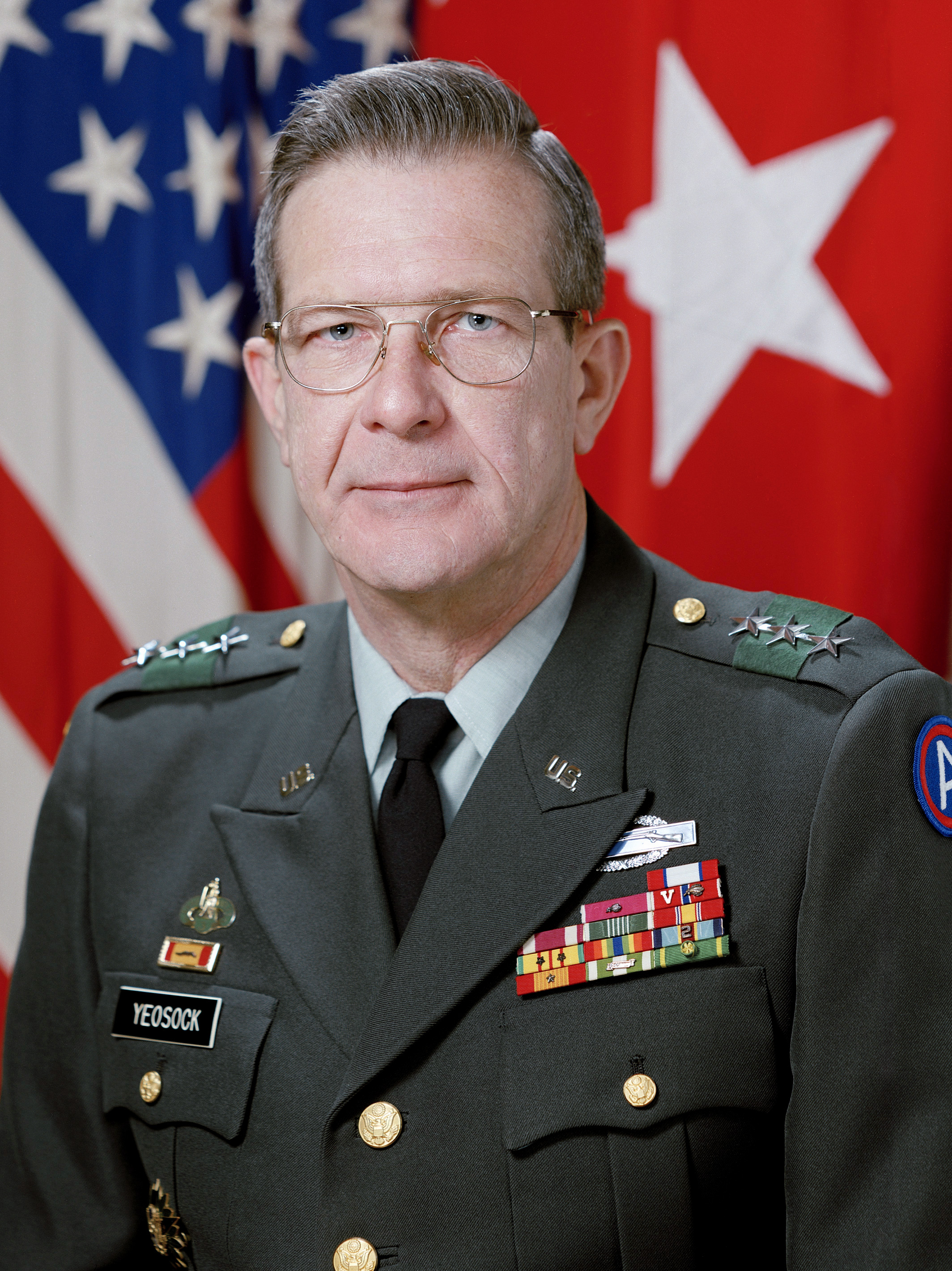
- Yeosock in 1989
- Born: March 18, 1937; Wilkes-Barre, Pennsylvania, U.S.
- Died: February 15, 2012 (aged 74); Fayetteville, Georgia, U.S.
- Burial place: Arlington National Cemetery
- Military career
- Allegiance: United States
- Branch: United States Army
- Service years: 1959–1992
- Rank: Lieutenant General
- Commands: Third United States Army; 1st Cavalry Division
- Conflicts: Vietnam War; Gulf War
- Awards: Army Distinguished Service Medal (2); Legion of Merit (2); Bronze Star Medal (2)

John John Yeosock (March 18, 1937 – February 15, 2012) was a United States Army lieutenant general who commanded the Third United States Army during Operation Desert Shield and Operation Desert Storm.

== Early life ==
John J. Yeosock was born in Wilkes-Barre, Pennsylvania, on March 18, 1937, and grew up in Plains Township. He studied at the Valley Forge Military Academy where he graduated as valedictorian. Unable to get into West Point due to bad eyesight, Yeosock joined the Reserve Officers' Training Corps at Pennsylvania State University, graduating in 1959 with a B.S. degree in industrial engineering. He later earned an M.S. degree in operations research and systems analysis from the Naval Postgraduate School in 1969. As an infantry officer Yeosock served in the Vietnam War. During the 1980s, Yeosock was the head of an U.S. military team sent to help modernize the Saudi Arabian National Guard.

== Command ==
Ground troop movements 24–28 February 1991 during Operation Desert Storm.

As a major general, Yeosock commanded the 1st Cavalry Division from June 1986 to May 1988, having been the 1st Cav's Assistant Division Commander (ADC) as a brigadier general during REFORGER in 1983. Promoted to lieutenant general, in 1989 he was given command of the Third United States Army. When Iraq invaded Kuwait, the Third Army was sent to Saudi Arabia in the buildup of coalition forces protecting the Kingdom during Operation Desert Shield. During the ground phase of the Gulf War, the 3rd Army formed the nucleus of the forces performing the "left hook" against the Iraqi Army. On February 19, 1991, he needed medical evacuation to Germany for emergency surgery, his command temporarily taken over by Lieutenant General Calvin Waller until his return to Saudi Arabia approximately ten days later. Yeosock retired from the army in August 1992.

== Death ==
Yeosock died on February 15, 2012, in Fayetteville, Georgia, aged 74, from lung cancer and is interred at Arlington National Cemetery.

== Family ==
Yeosock had two children with his wife Betta Hoffner: son John and daughter Elizabeth. Through the latter, he is the father-in-law of General Paul E. Funk II.

== Awards ==
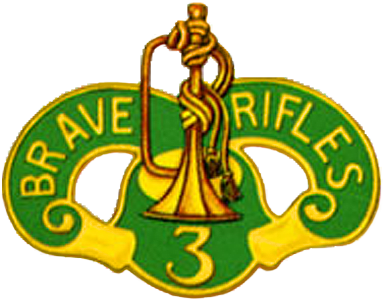
Combat Infantryman Badge
Army Staff Identification Badge
3rd Armored Cavalry Regiment Distinctive Unit Insignia

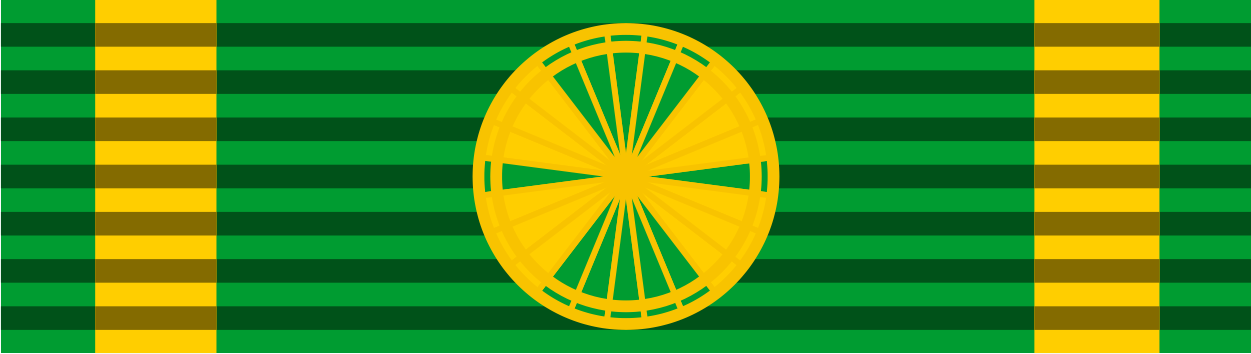
Army Distinguished Service Medal with one bronze oak leaf cluster
Legion of Merit with one oak leaf cluster
Bronze Star Medal with "V" device and one oak leaf cluster
Army Meritorious Service Medal
Army Commendation Medal
National Defense Service Medal with service star
Vietnam Service Medal with two campaign stars
Army Service Ribbon
Overseas Service Ribbon with award numeral "2"
Vietnam Gallantry Cross with bronze star
Order of King Abdulaziz, 2nd class (Saudi Arabia)
Legion of Honour, Knight (France)
Vietnam Gallantry Cross Unit Citation
Republic of Vietnam Campaign Medal
