= Military ranks of the KGB (1955–1991) =

Shoulder Boards of the Committee For State Security of the Soviet Union

After the Armed forces' ranks and rank insignia of the Soviet Armed Forces between 1955 and 1991 were reorganized after the death of Stalin, The KGB, along with its branches, the MVD, and the Border Troops, underwent the same reorganization of ranks, completely removing the regimental numbering of 1943-1955.

== Changes to distinction insignia ==
=== Shoulder straps to field use ===
In December 1956 the colored border piping on officers' shoulder straps was changed.

=== Enlisted men, non-commissioned officers, and warrant officers ===
==== Security forces ====
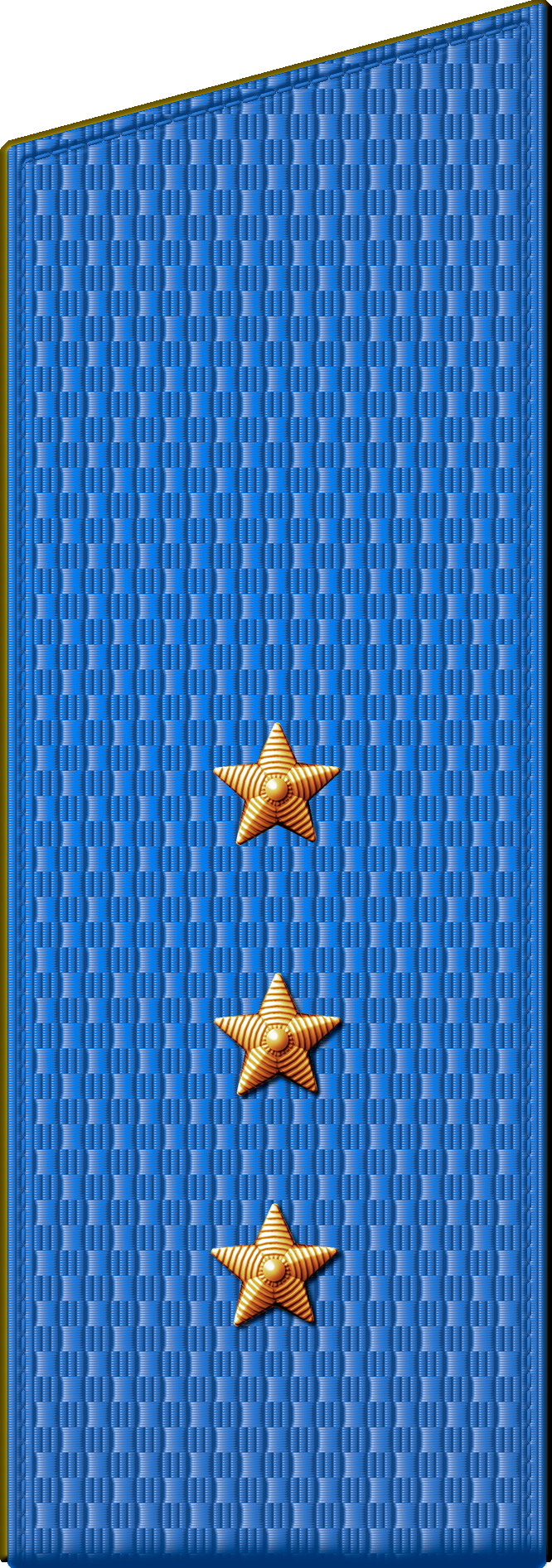
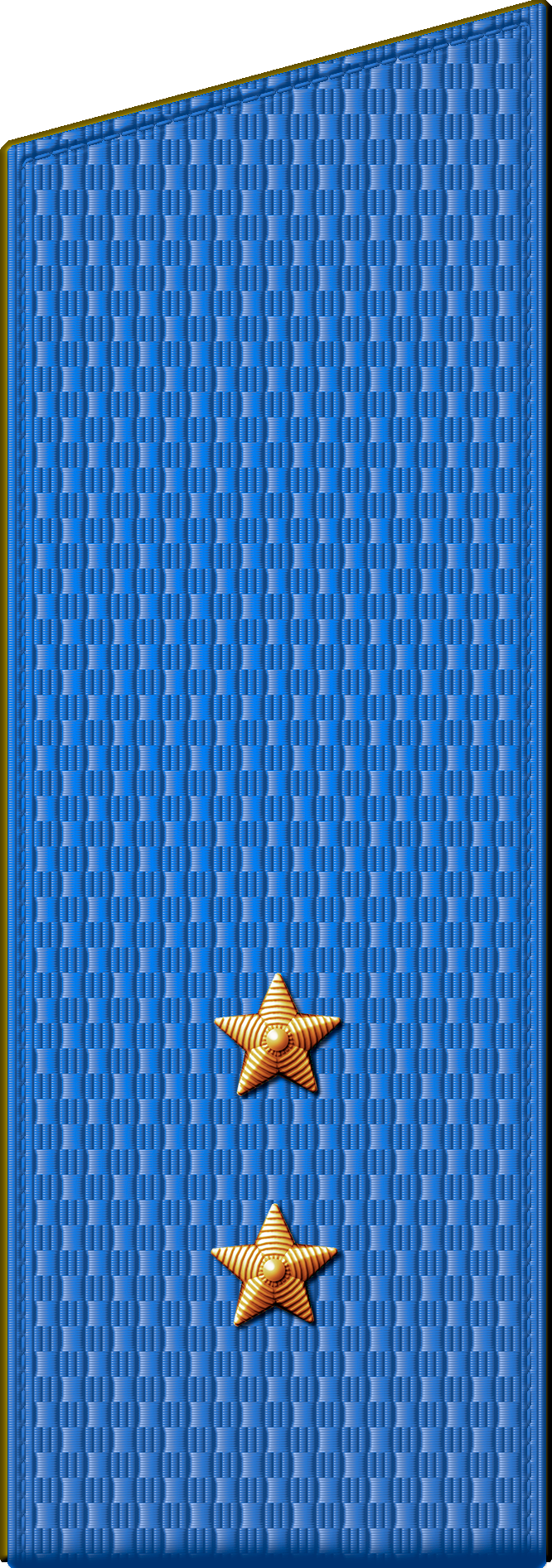
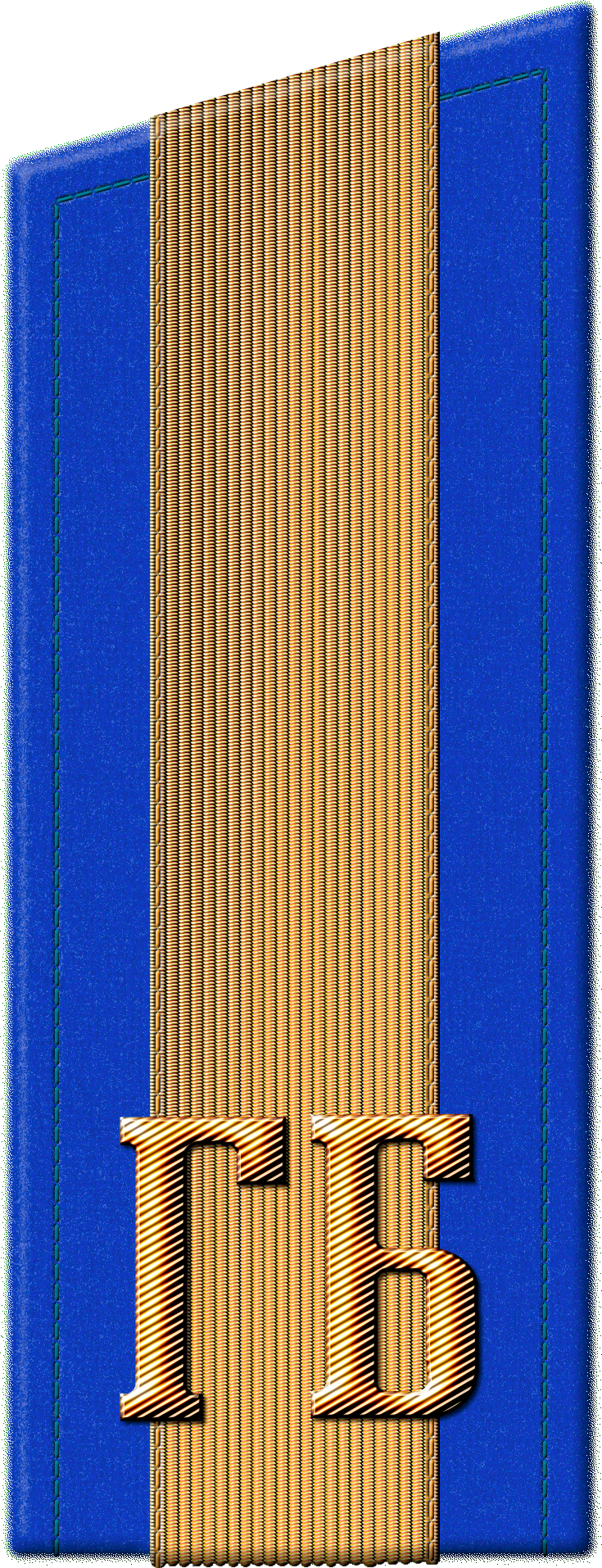
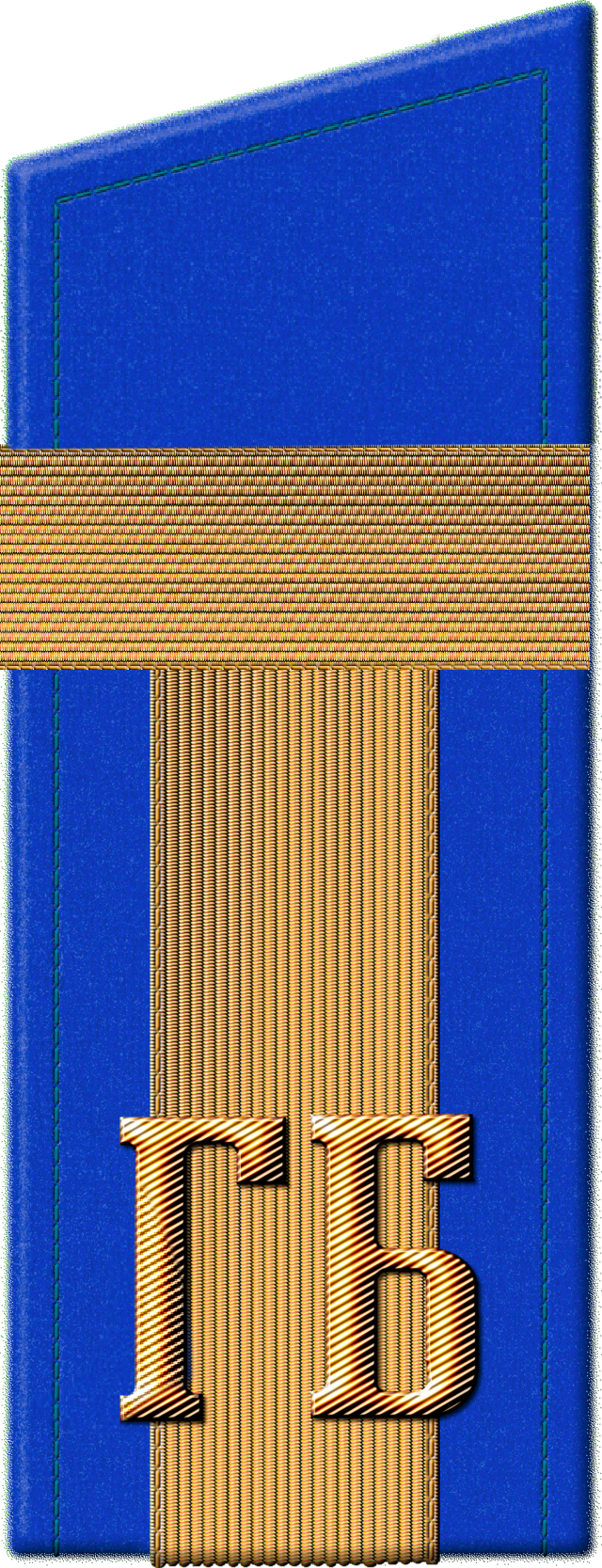
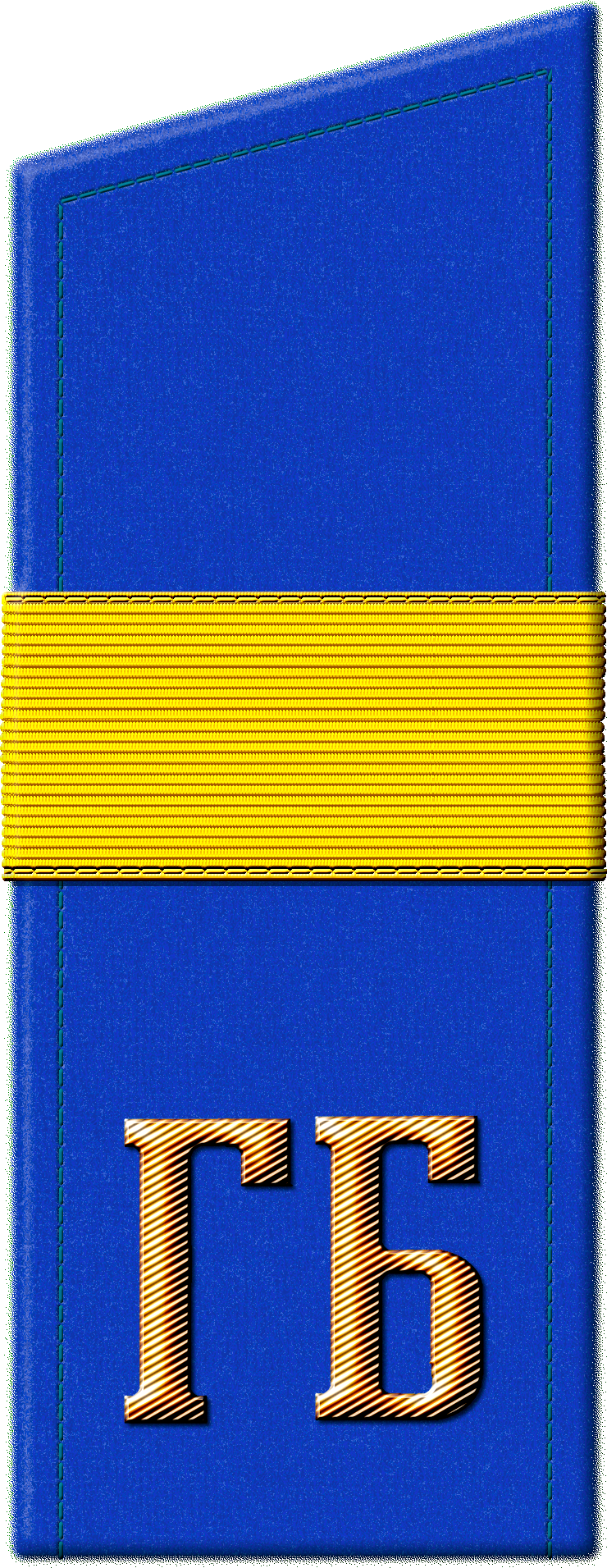
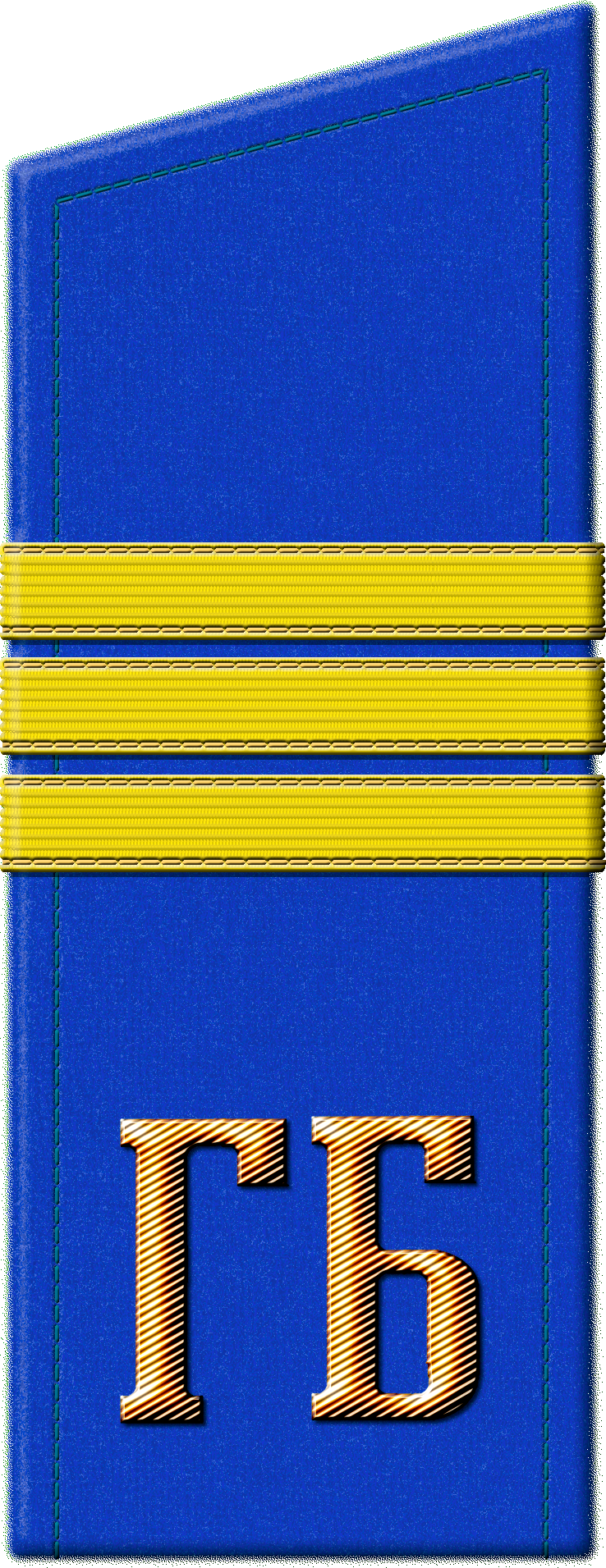
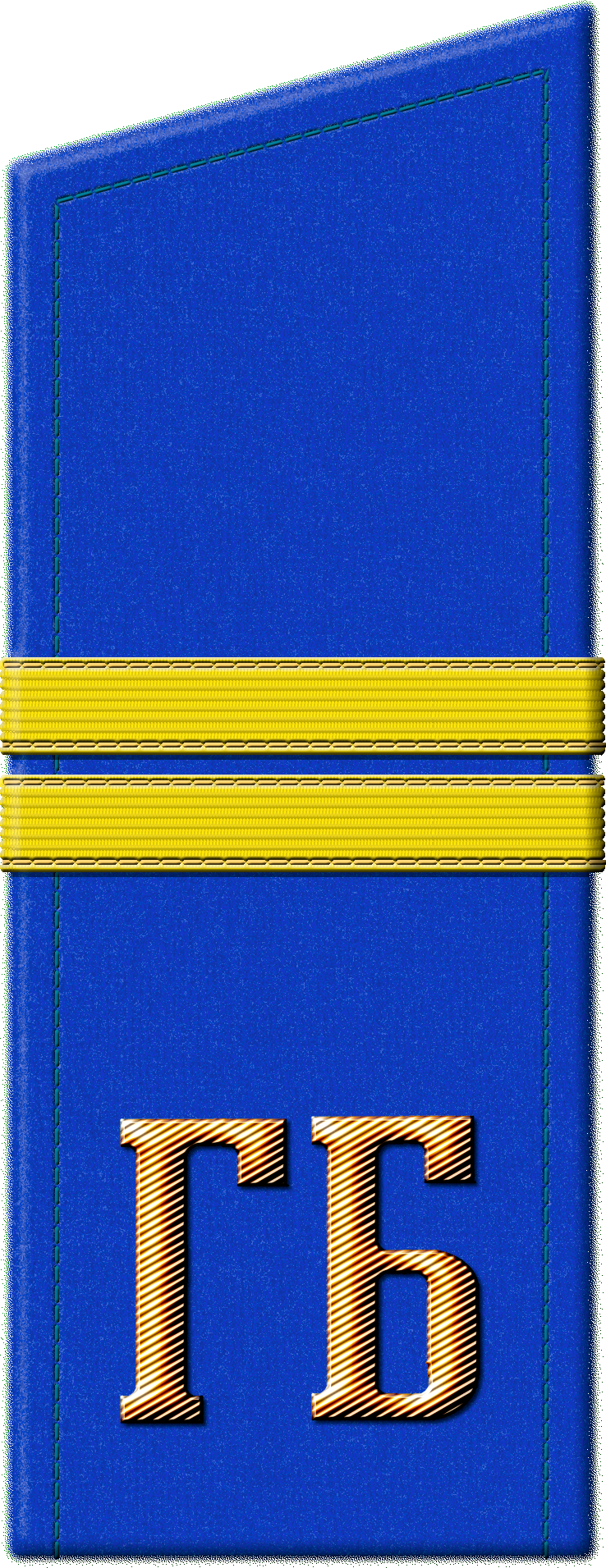
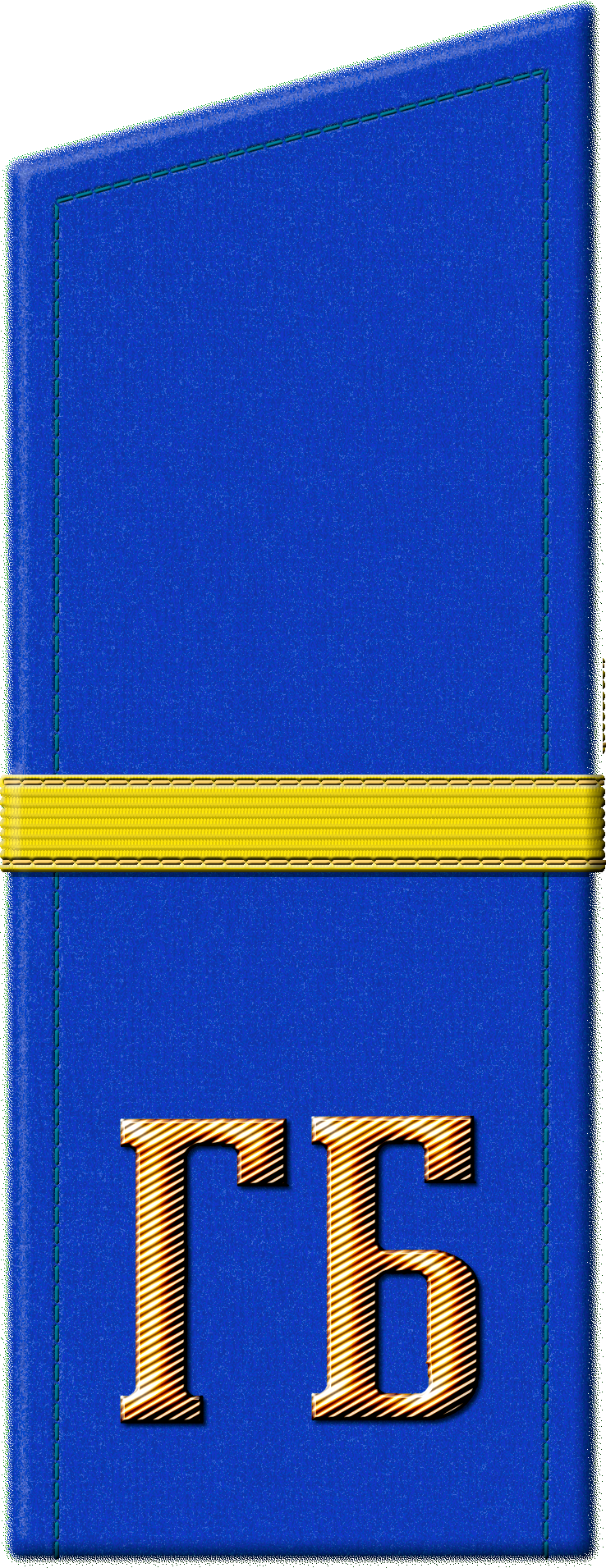
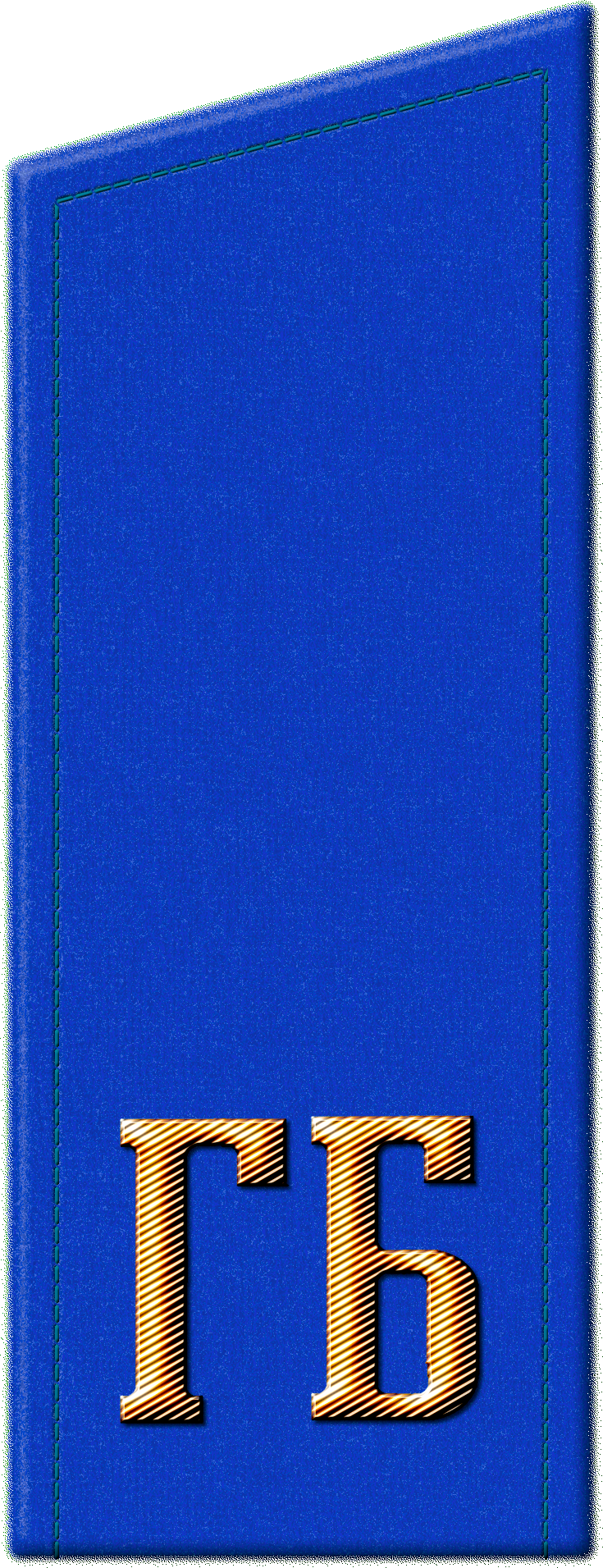
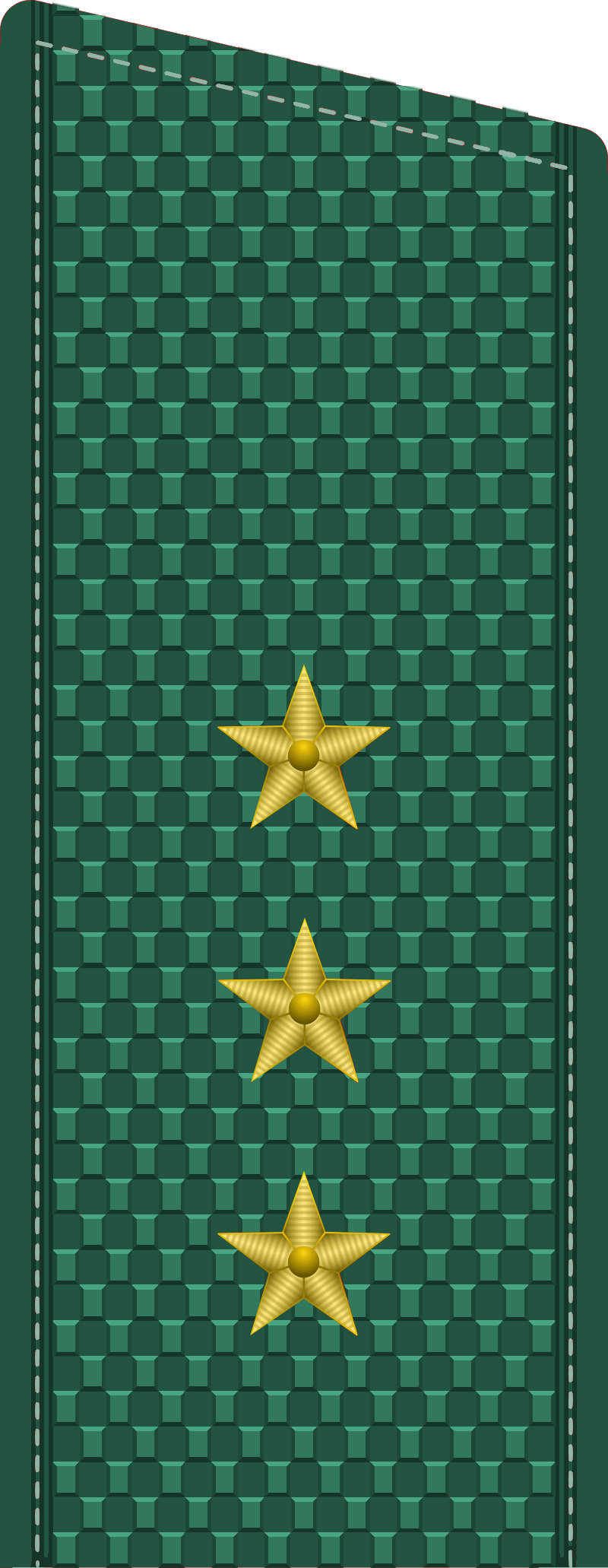
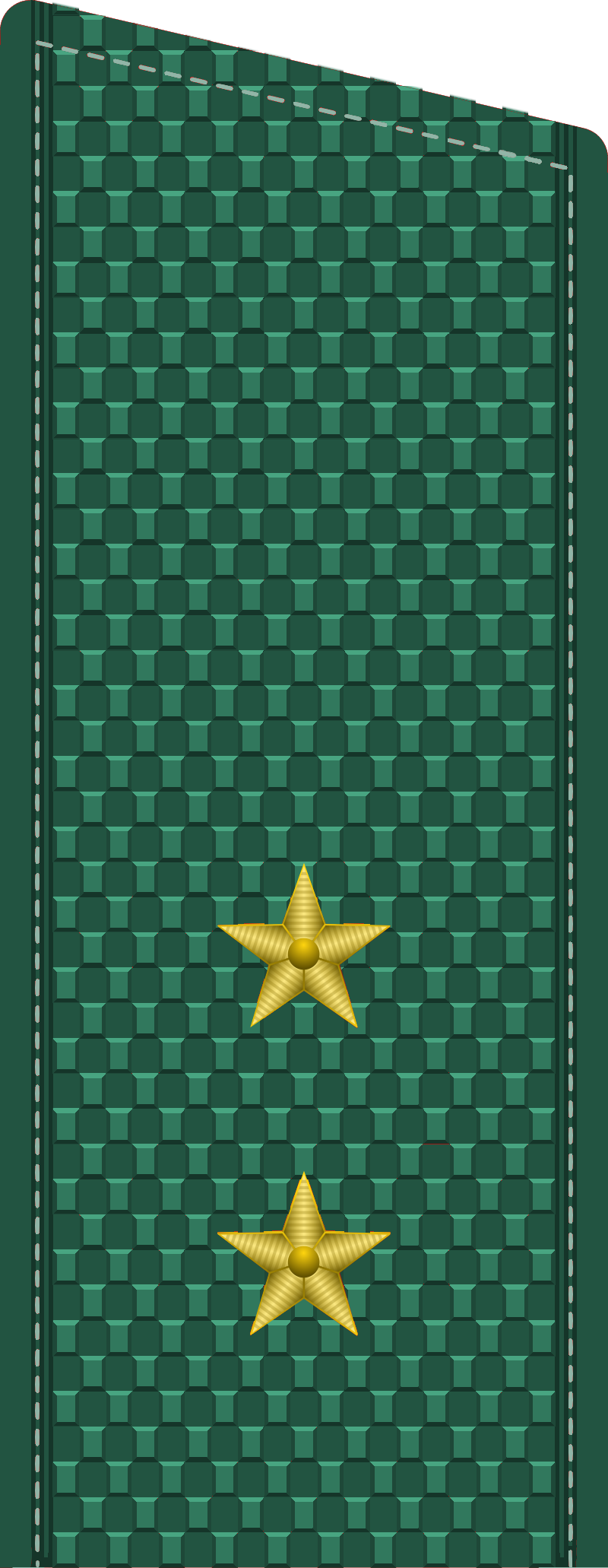
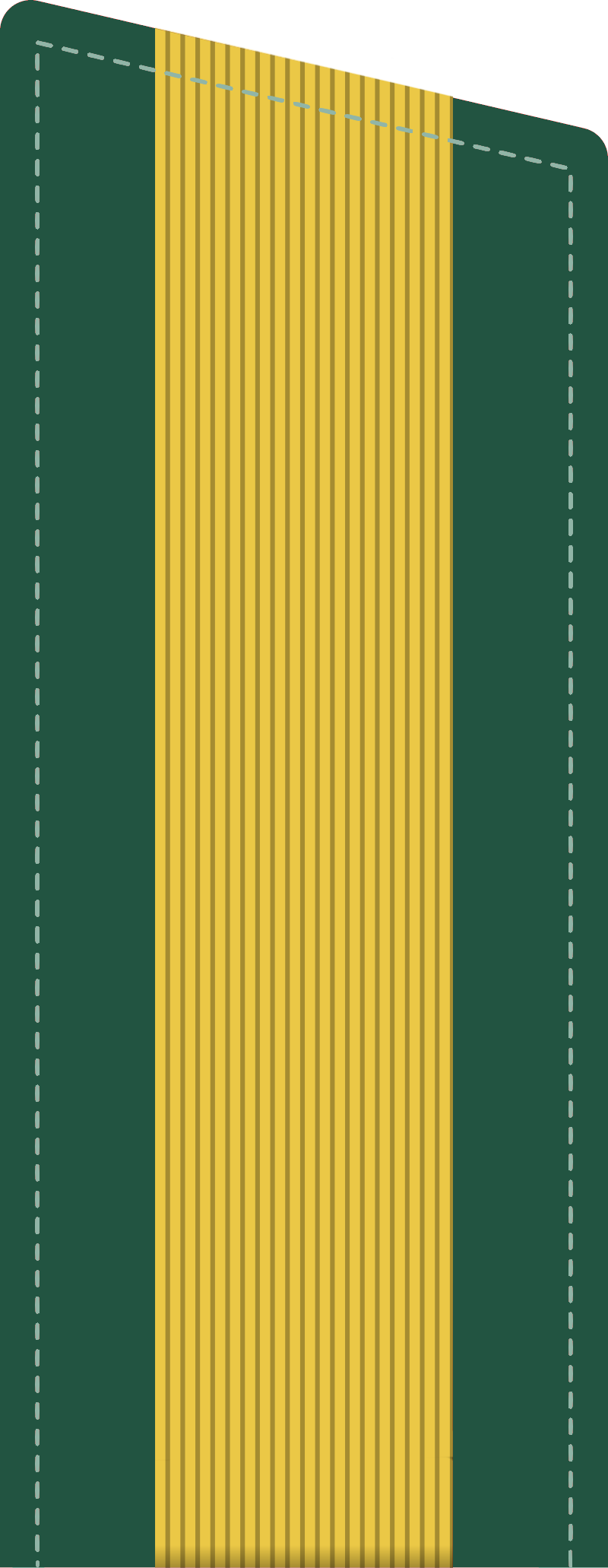
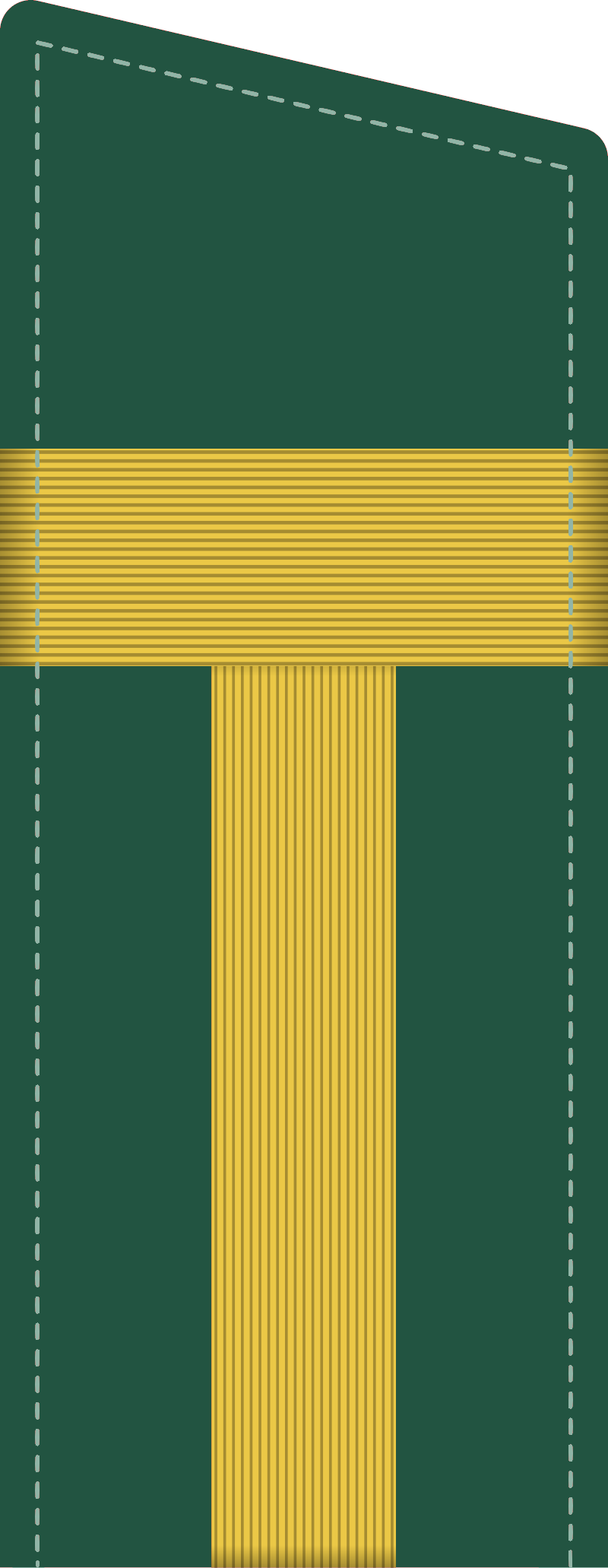
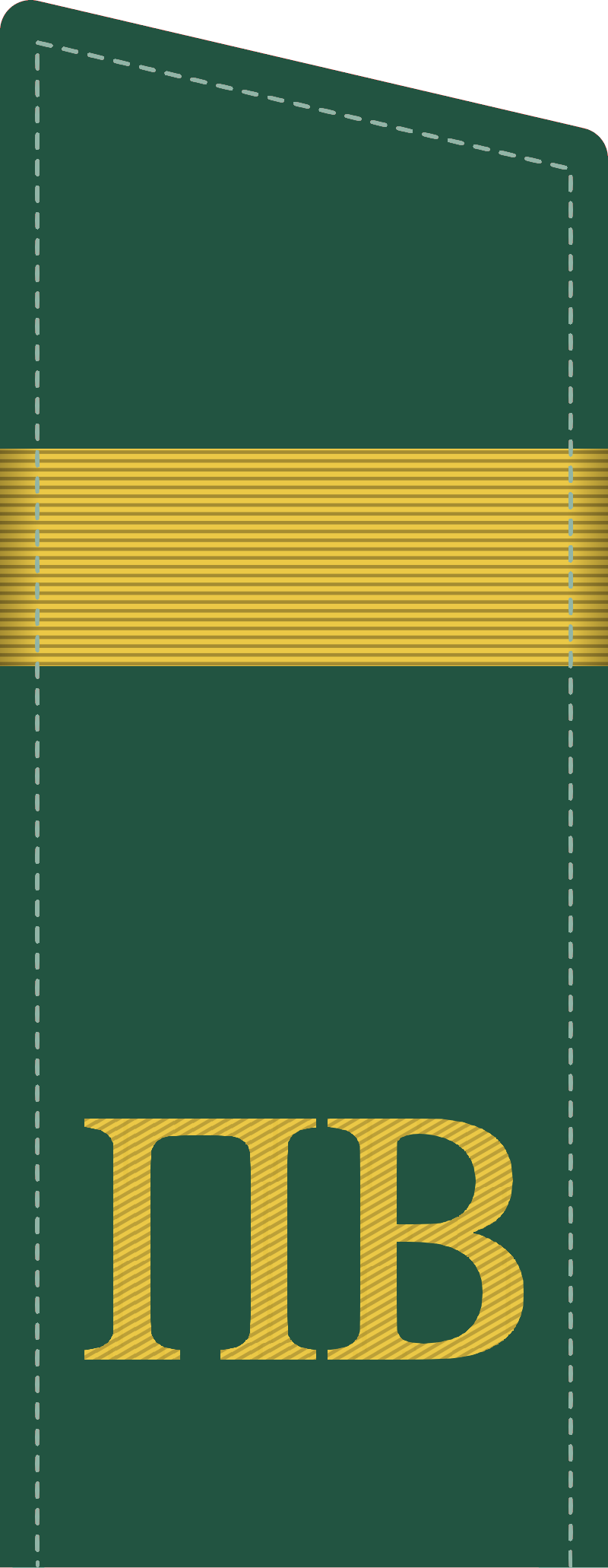
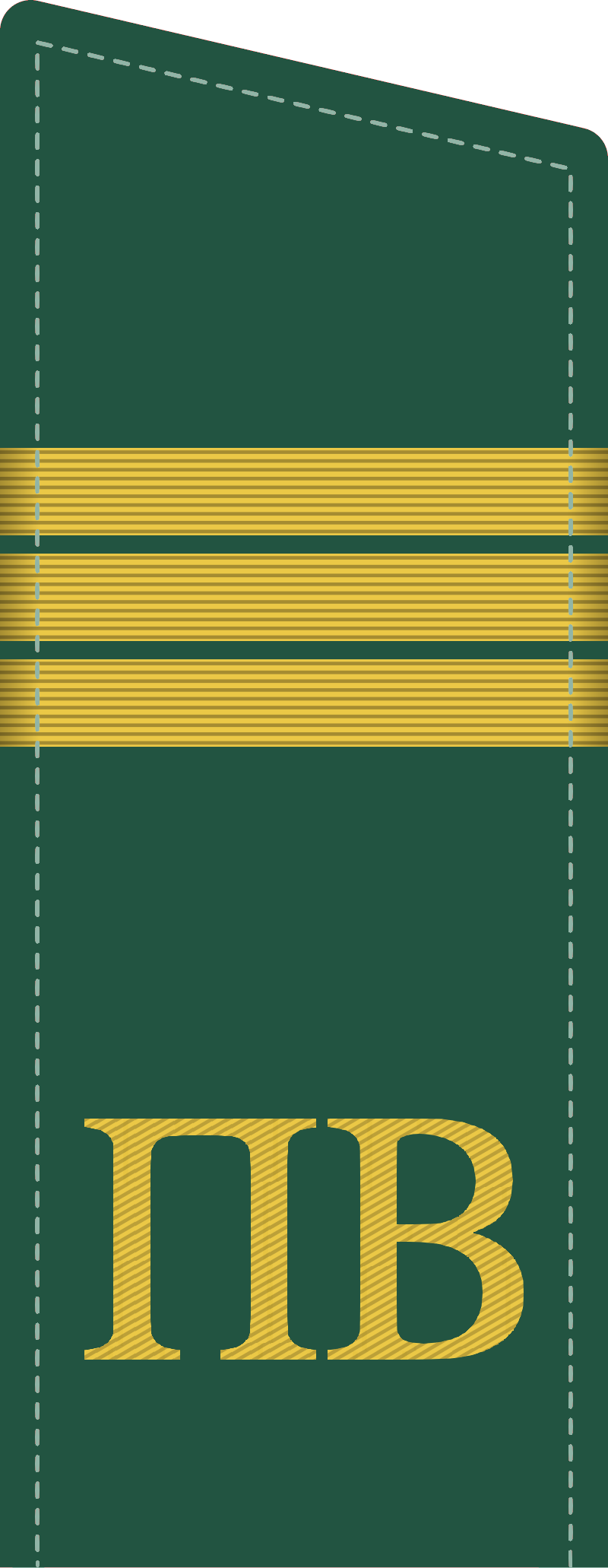
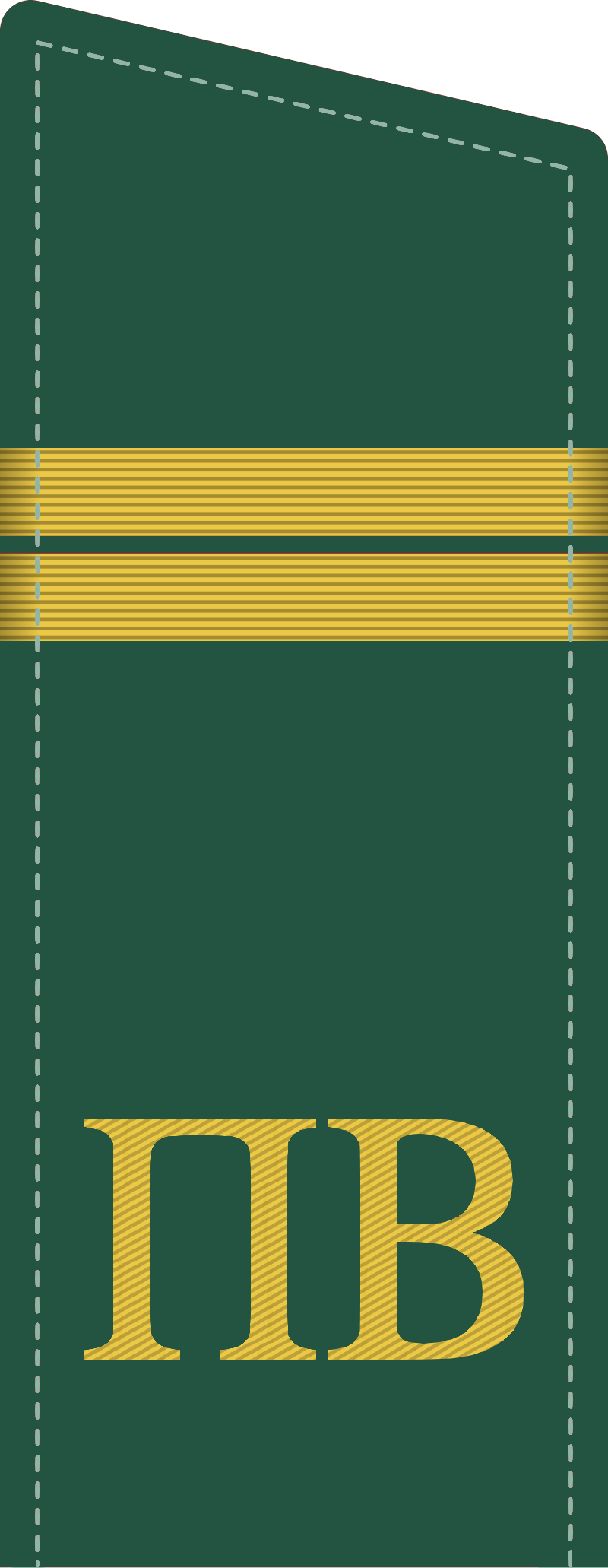
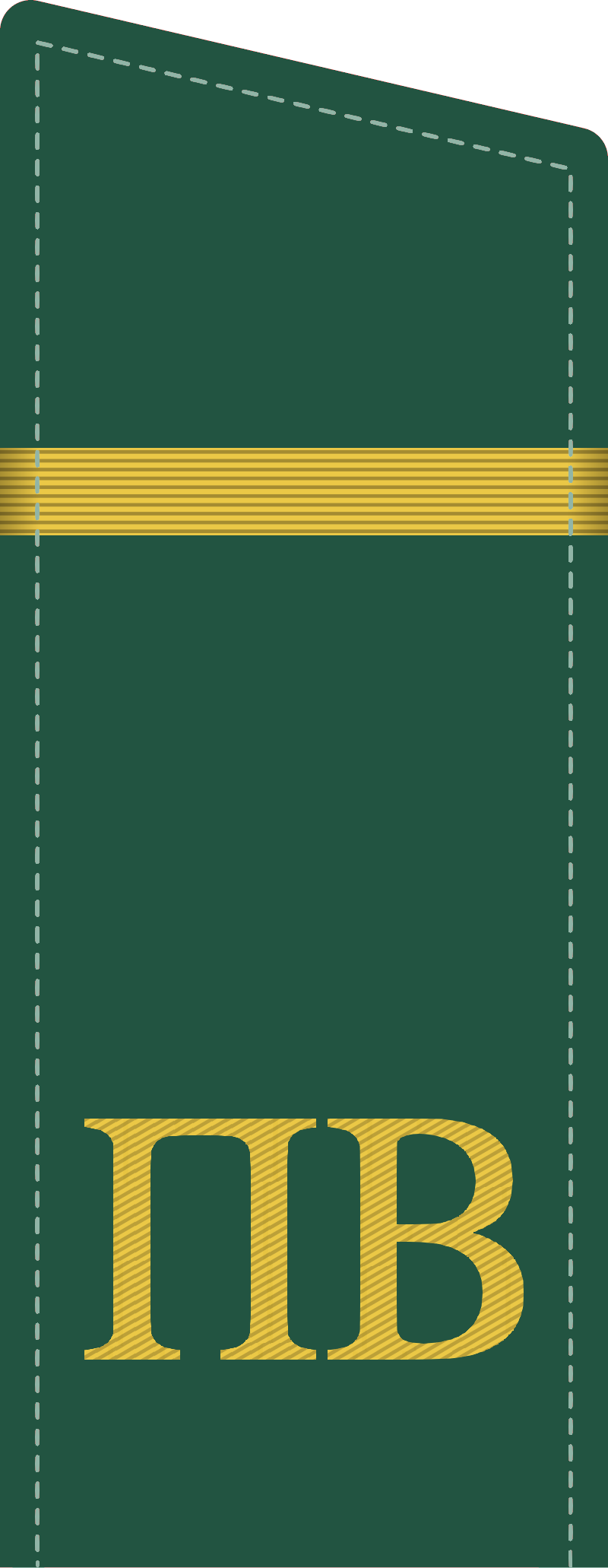
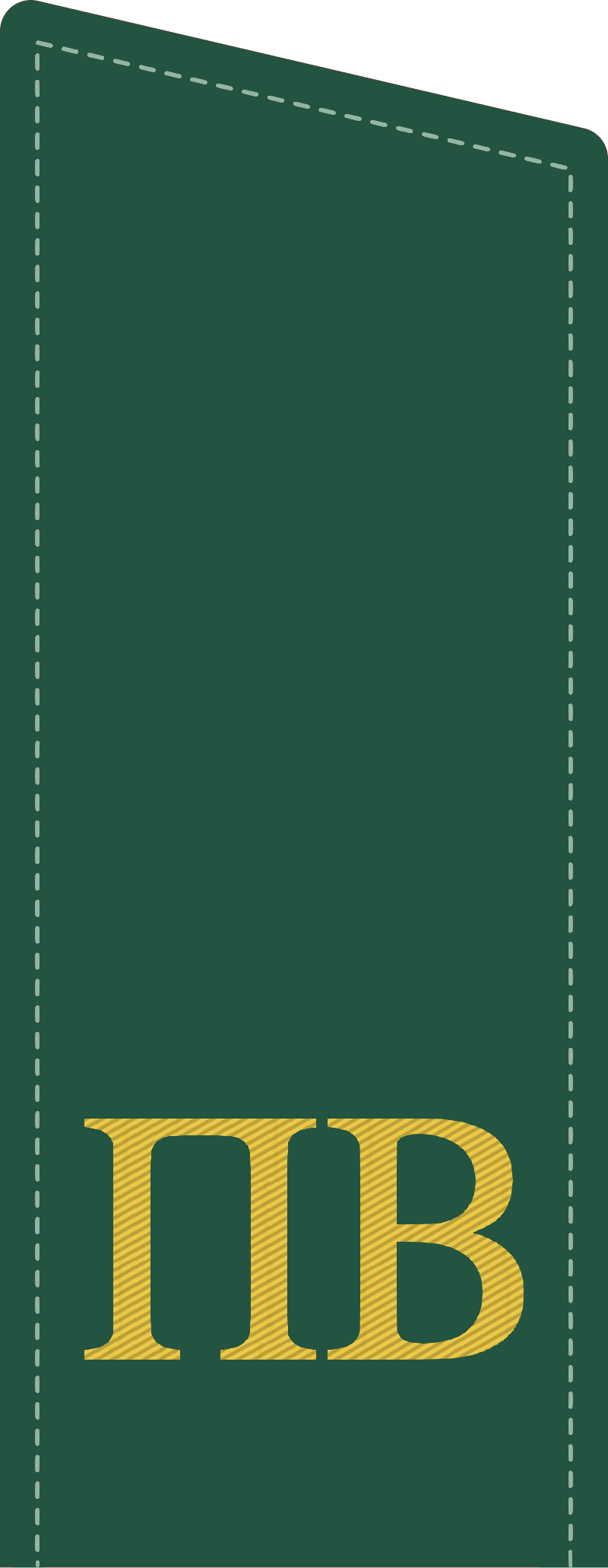
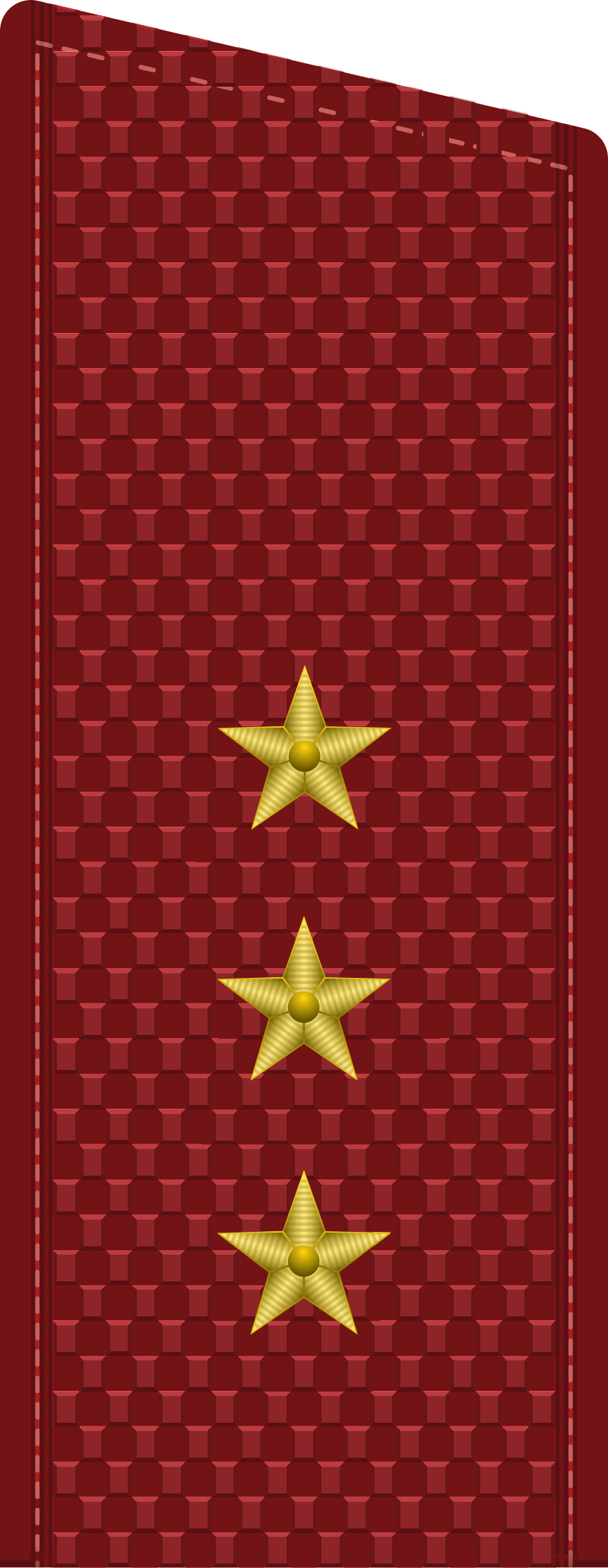
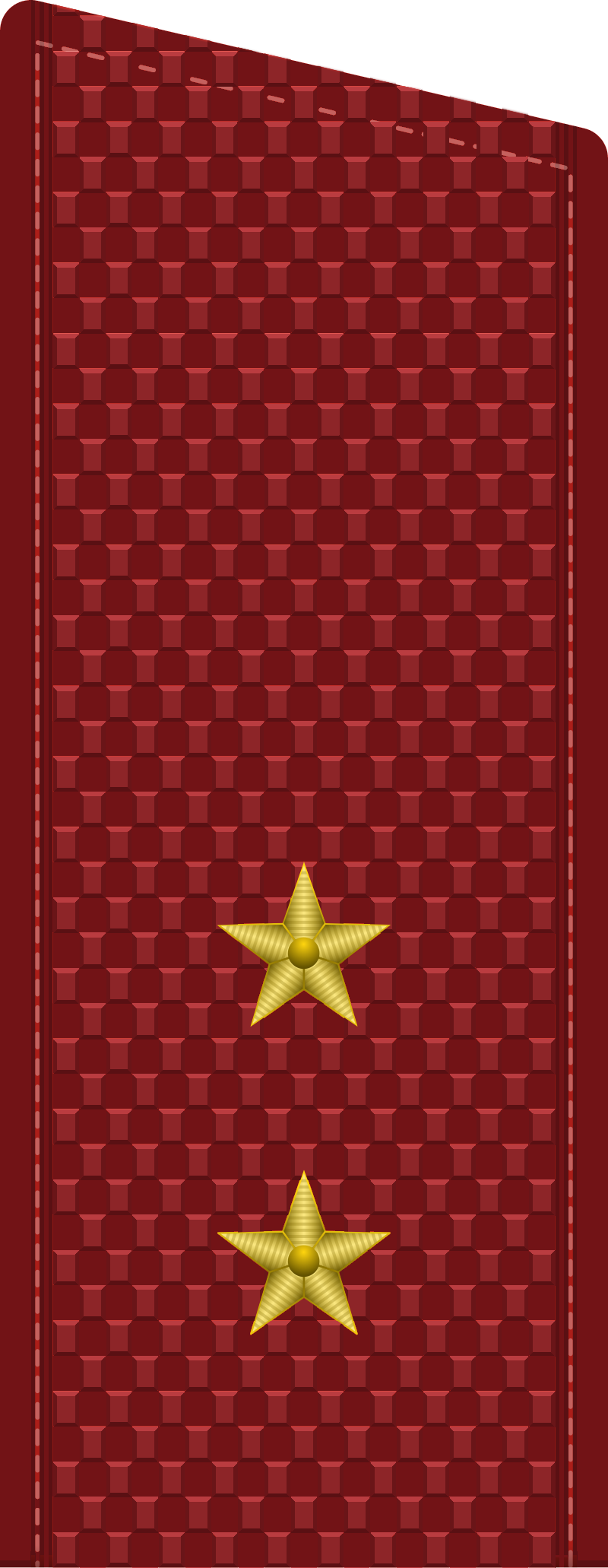
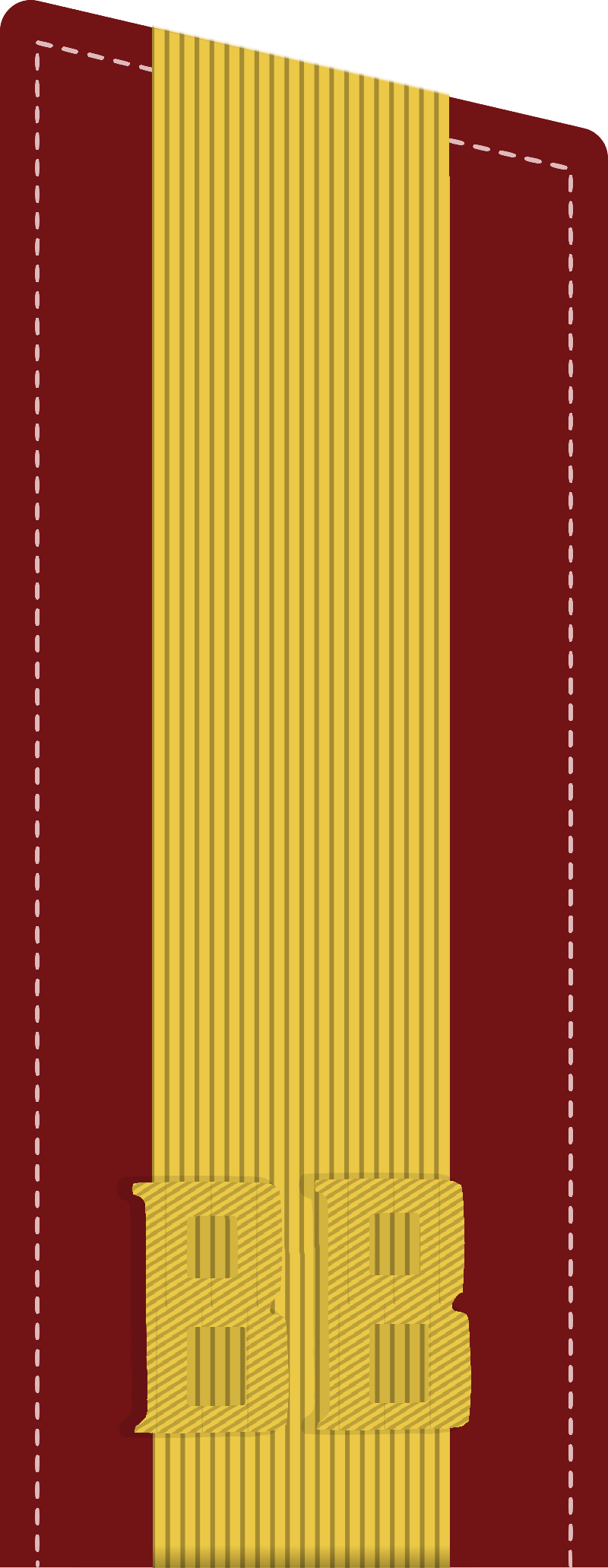
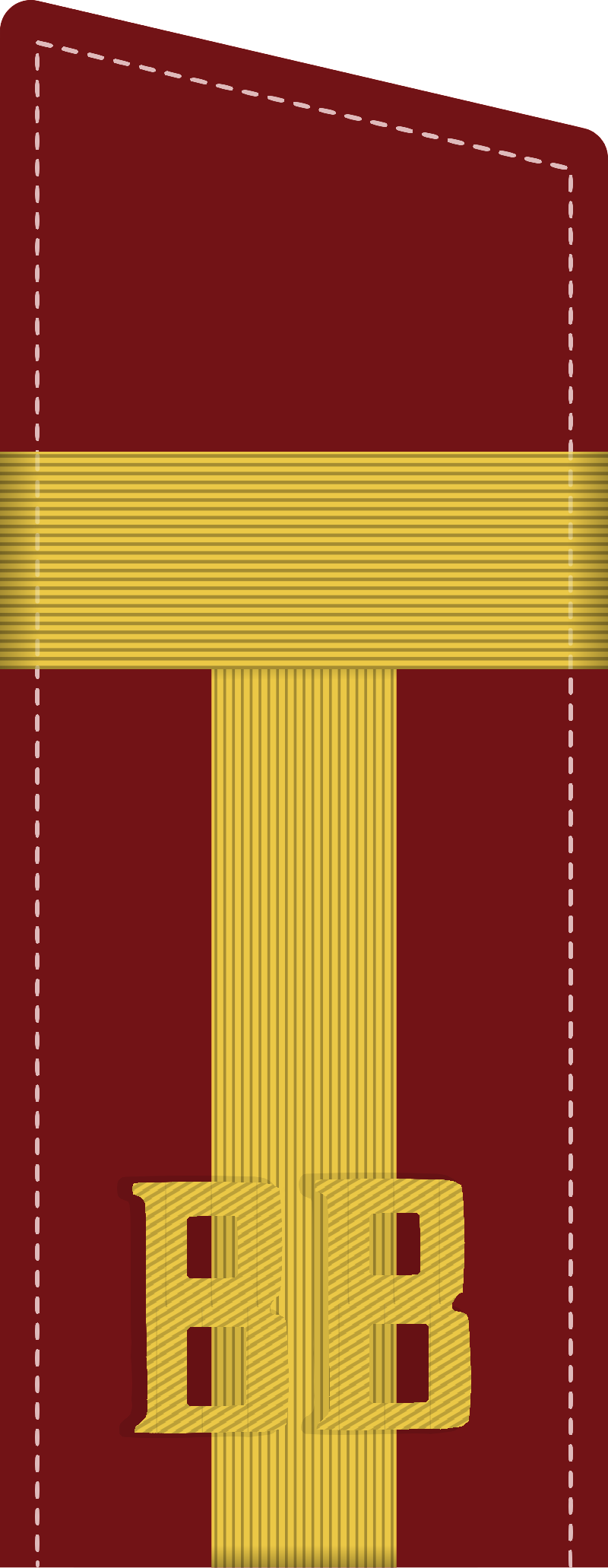
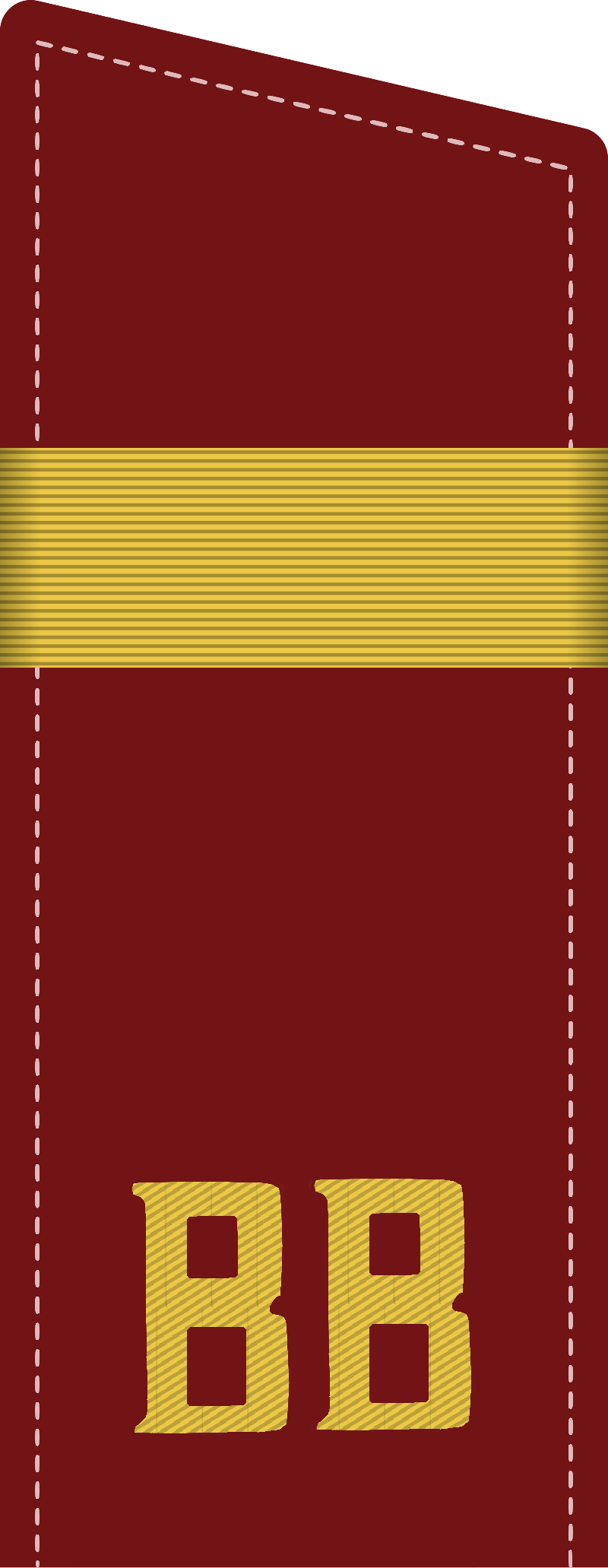
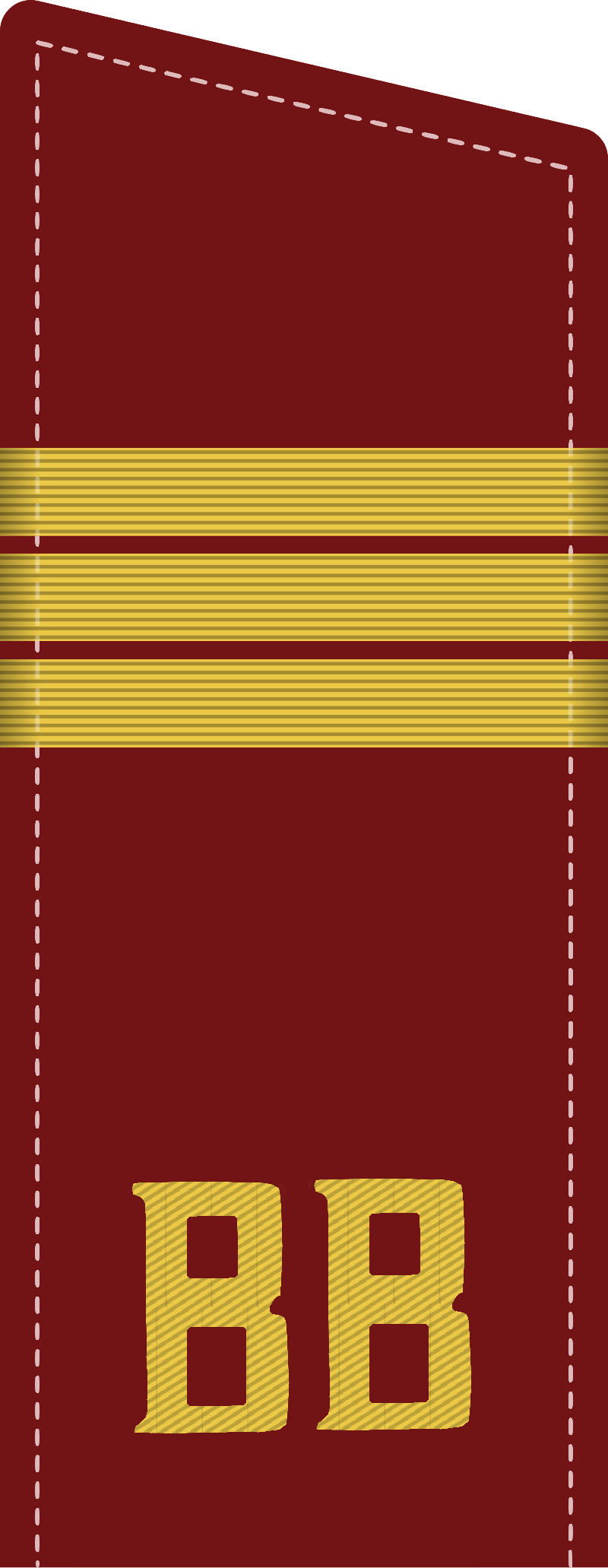
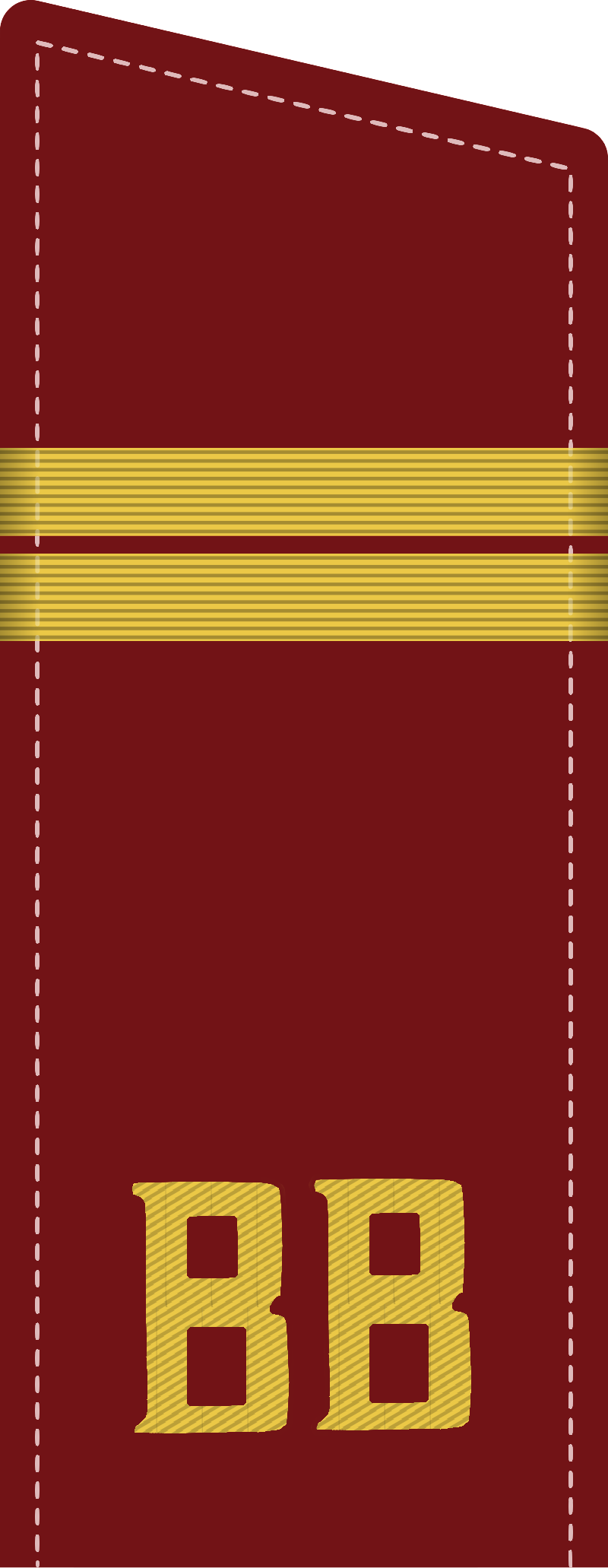
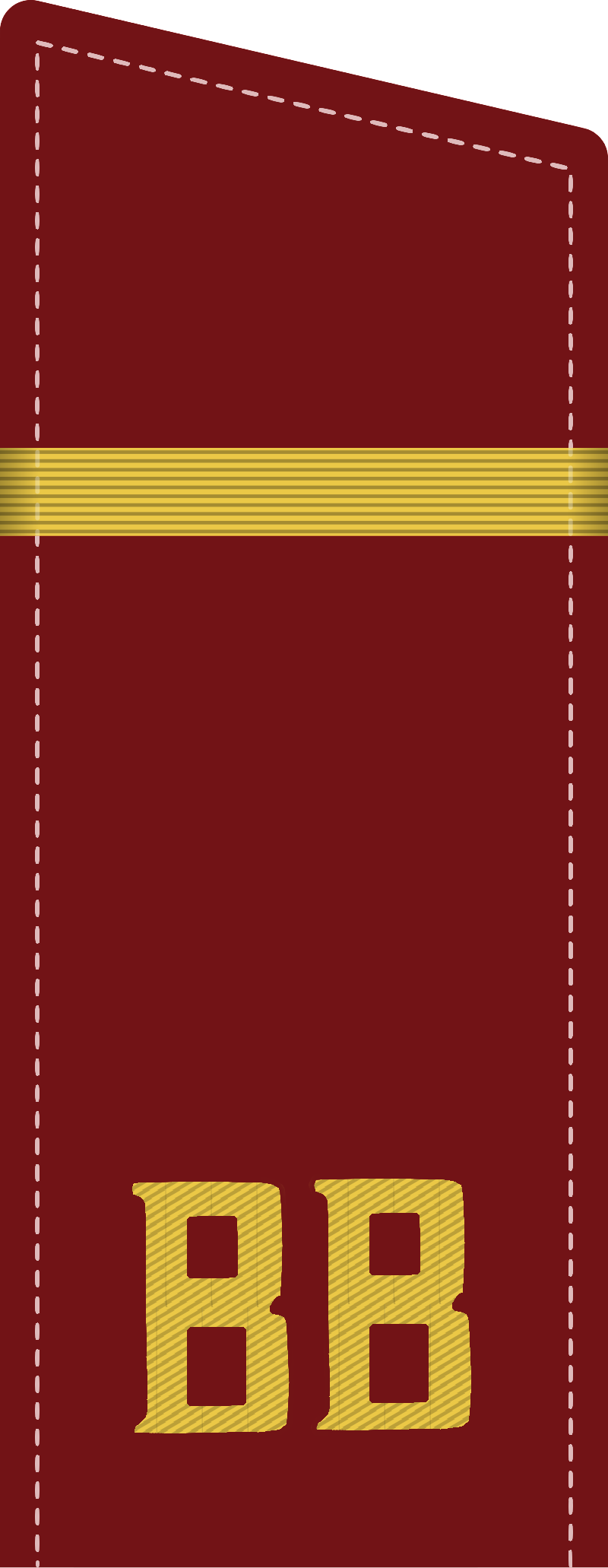
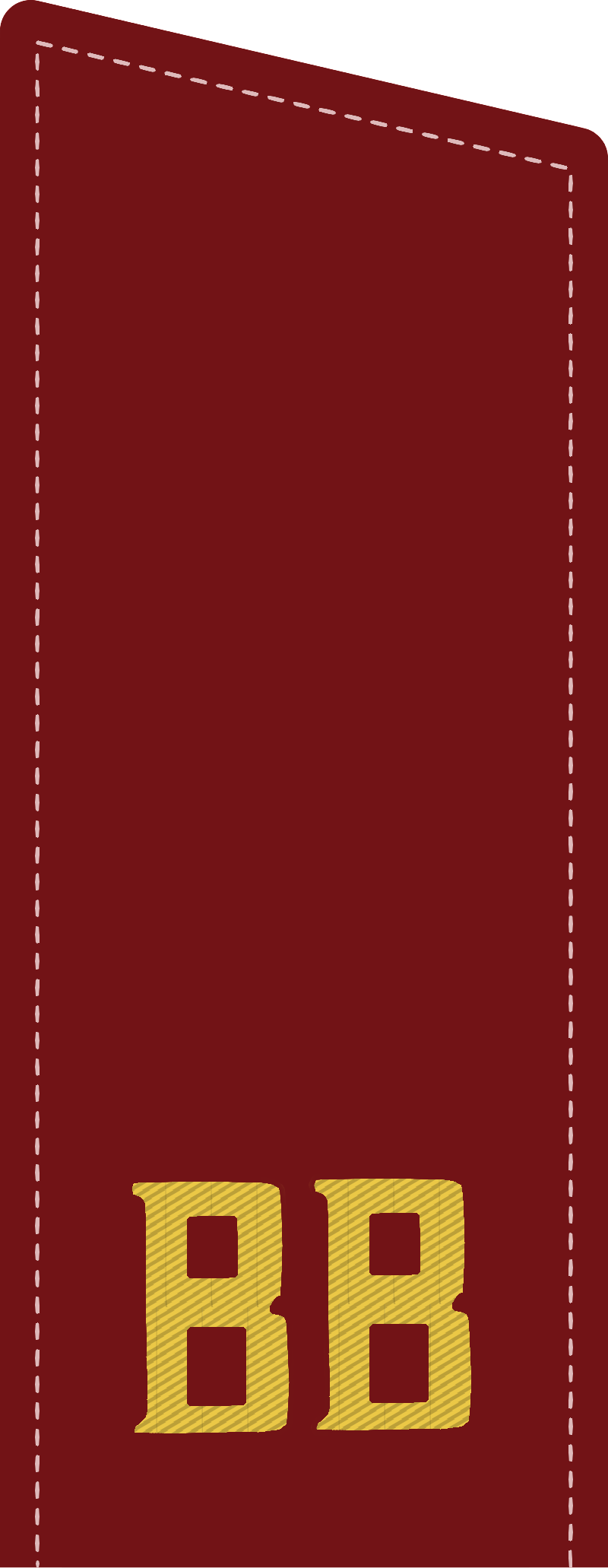
Rank group	Warrant officers		Non-commissioned officers					Enlisted men
Parade Shoulder boards (Committee of State Security Forces, KGB)
Parade Shoulder boards (Border Troops)
Parade Shoulder boards (Internal Troops)
	(introduced 1981)	(introduced 1971)	(from 1964)	(until 1963)
	Ста́рший пра́порщик Stárshiy práporshchik	Пра́порщик Práporshchyk	Старшина́ Starshyná		Ста́рший сержа́нт Stárshiy serzhánt	Сержа́нт Serzhánt	Мла́дший сержа́нт Mládshiy serzhánt	Ефре́йтор Efréĭtor	Рядово́й Ryadovóy
US equivalent	Chief warrant officer	Warrant officer	Command sergeant major		Sergeant major	Master sergeant	Sergeant	Private first class	Private

Colors by type of troops:

- State security troops (KGB troops) – dark blue, instead of the Cyrillic letters "СА" (SA; Советская Армия, Sovetskaya Armiya, 'Soviet Army') the letters "ГБ" (GB; Государственная Безопасность, Gosudarstvennaya Bezopasnost – State Security);
- Internal troops (Interior Ministry troops) – crimson (dark red), instead of the letters СА the letters "ВВ" (VV; Внутренние Войска, Vnutrenniye Voyska);
- Border troops – green, instead of the letters "СА" the letters "ПВ" (Пограничные Войска, Pogranichnyye Voyska).

=== Letter codes from 1972 onward ===
- ВВ – (VV; Russian: Внутренние Войска, romanized: Vnutrennie voiska) – Internal Troops
- ГБ – (GB; Russian: Госуда́рственной Безопа́сности, romanized: Gosudarstvennoy Bezopasnosti) – Committee for State Security (KGB)
- К – (K; Russian: Курсант, romanized: Kursant) – higher military college student
- ПВ – (PV; Russian: Пограничные войска, romanized: Pogranichnye voiska) – border troops

=== Army officers and generals (all services) ===
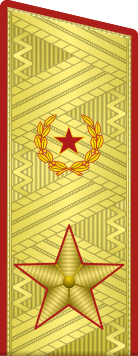
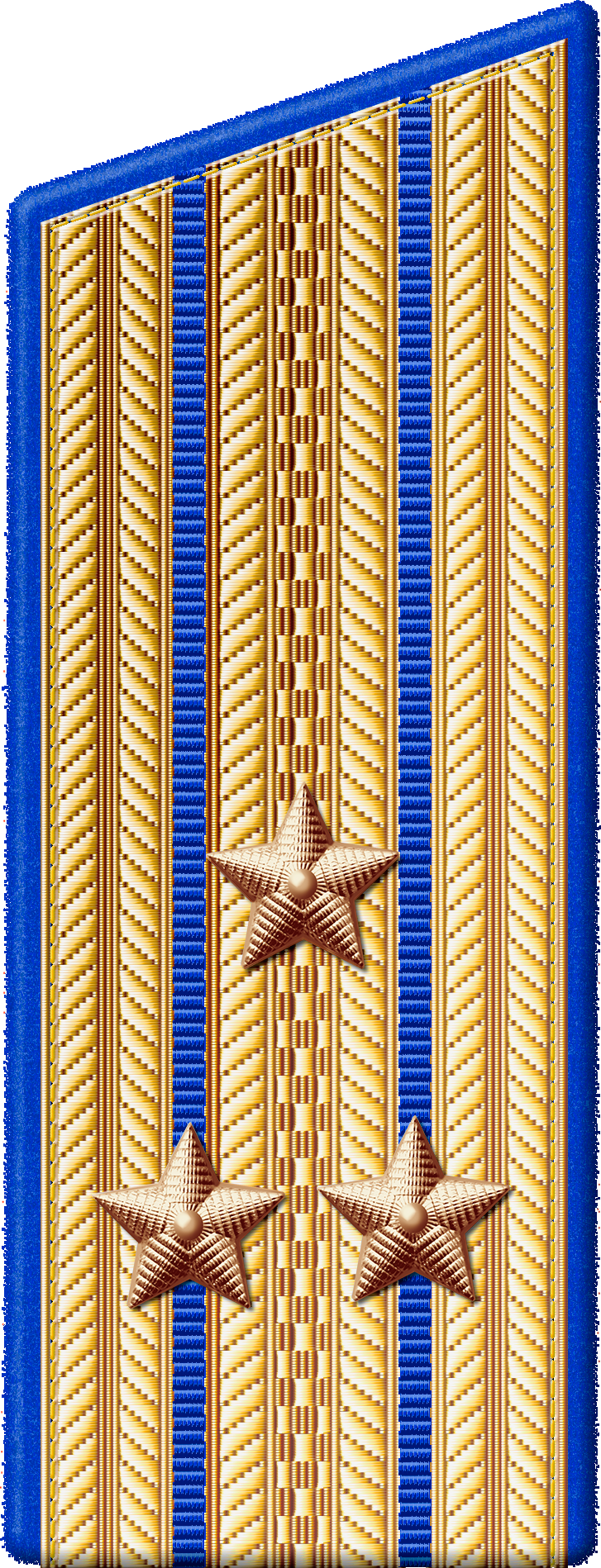
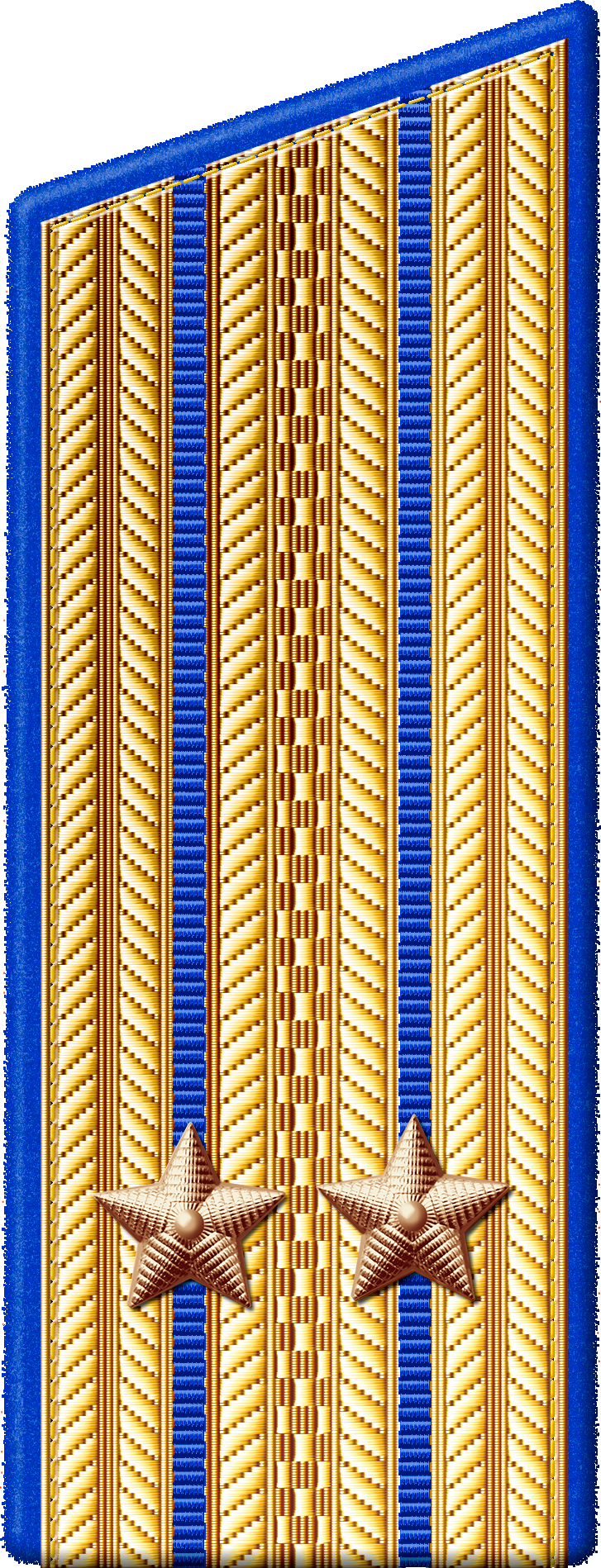
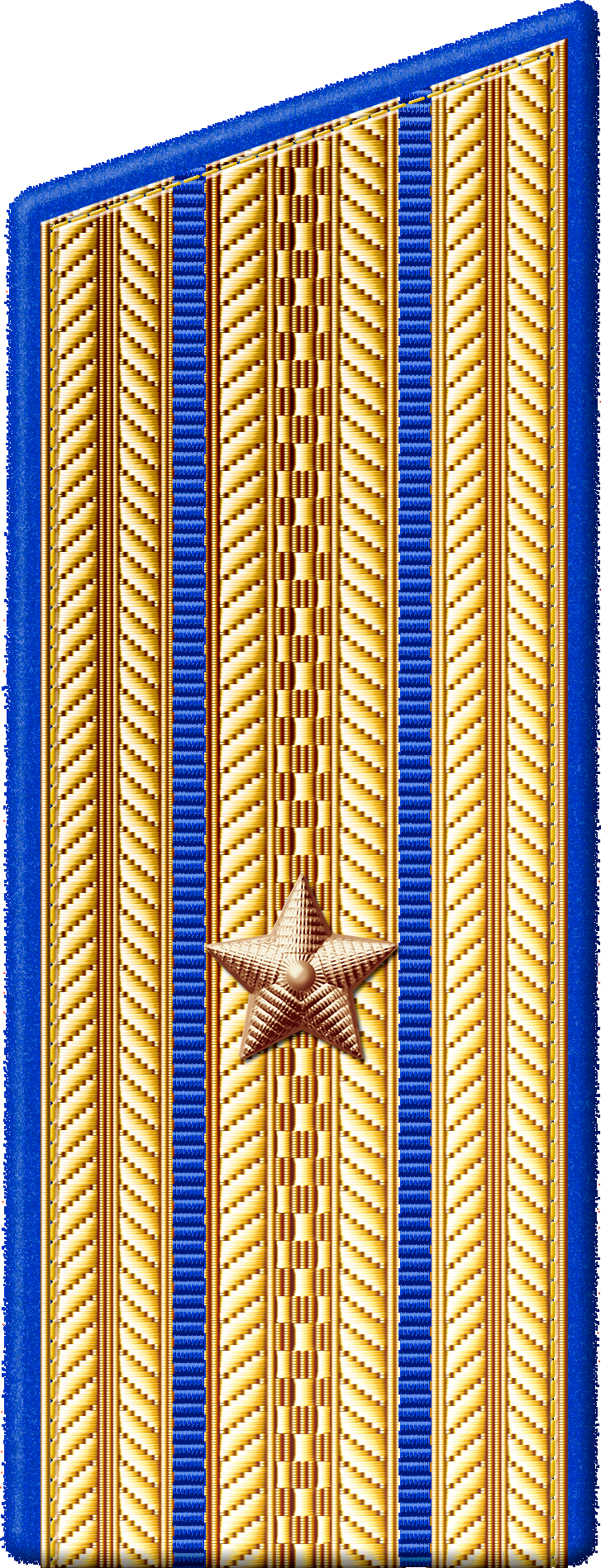
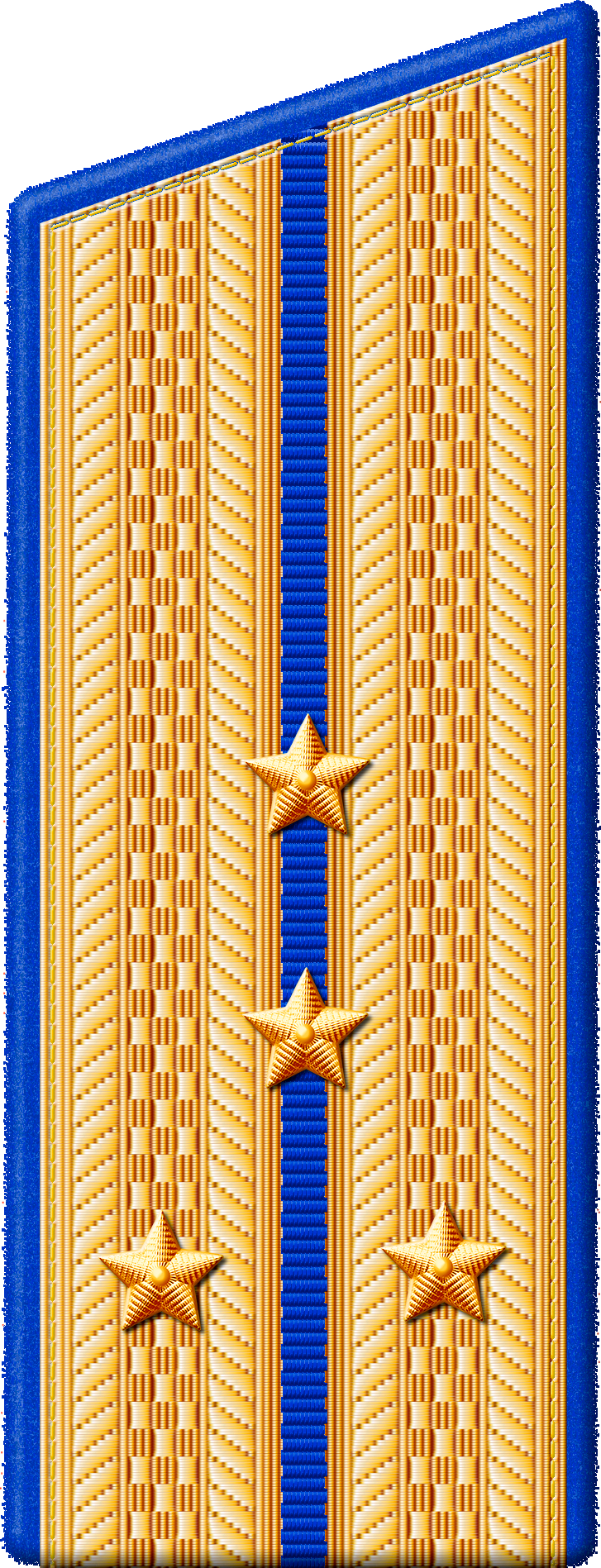
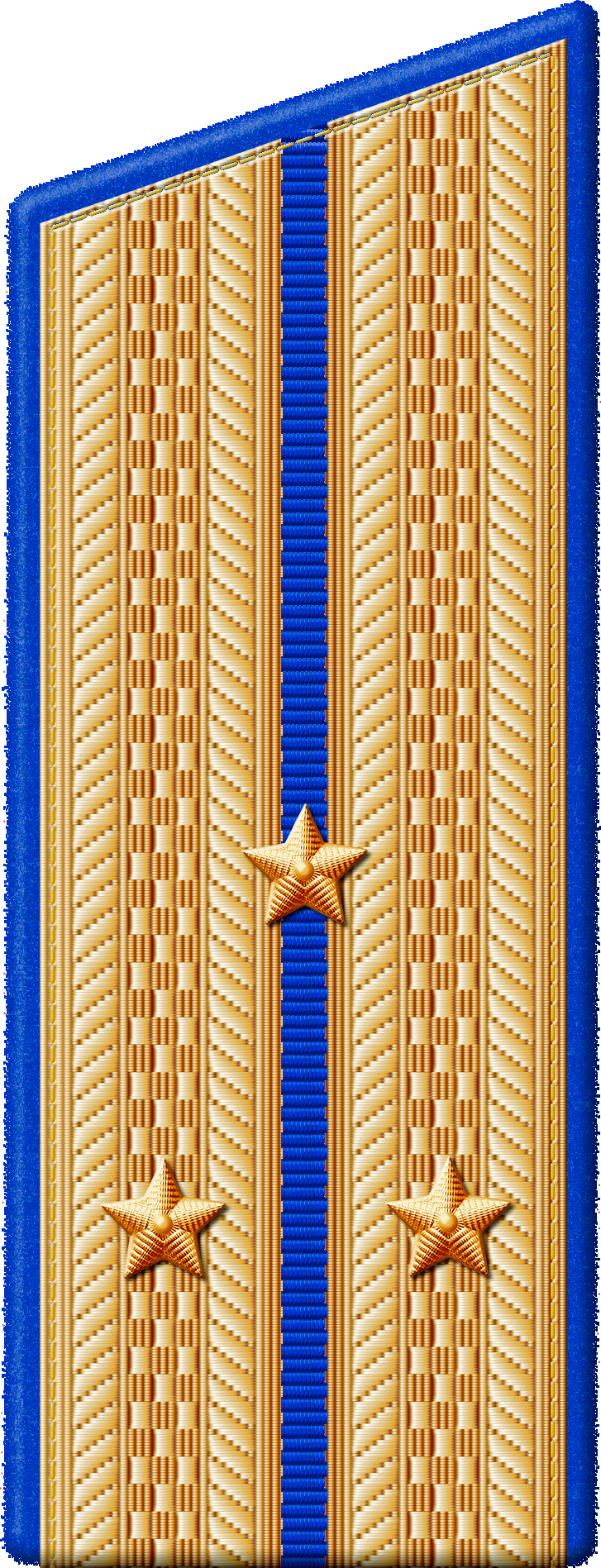
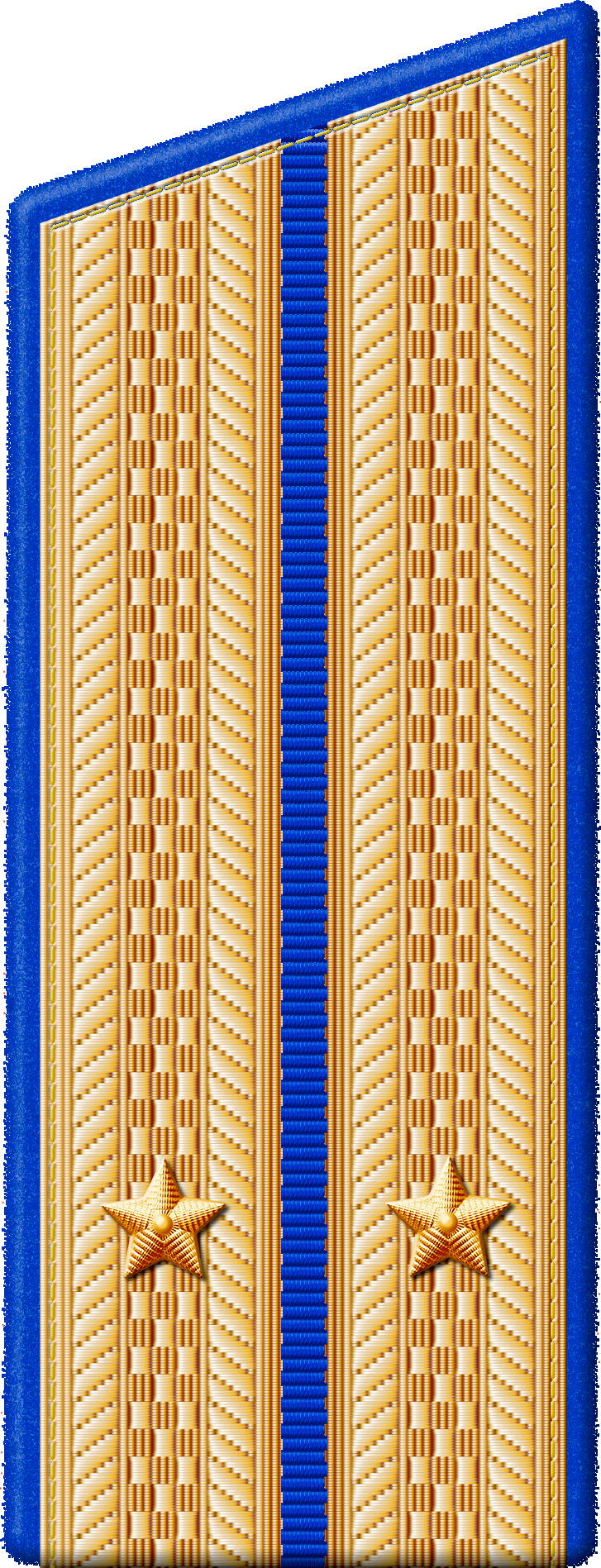
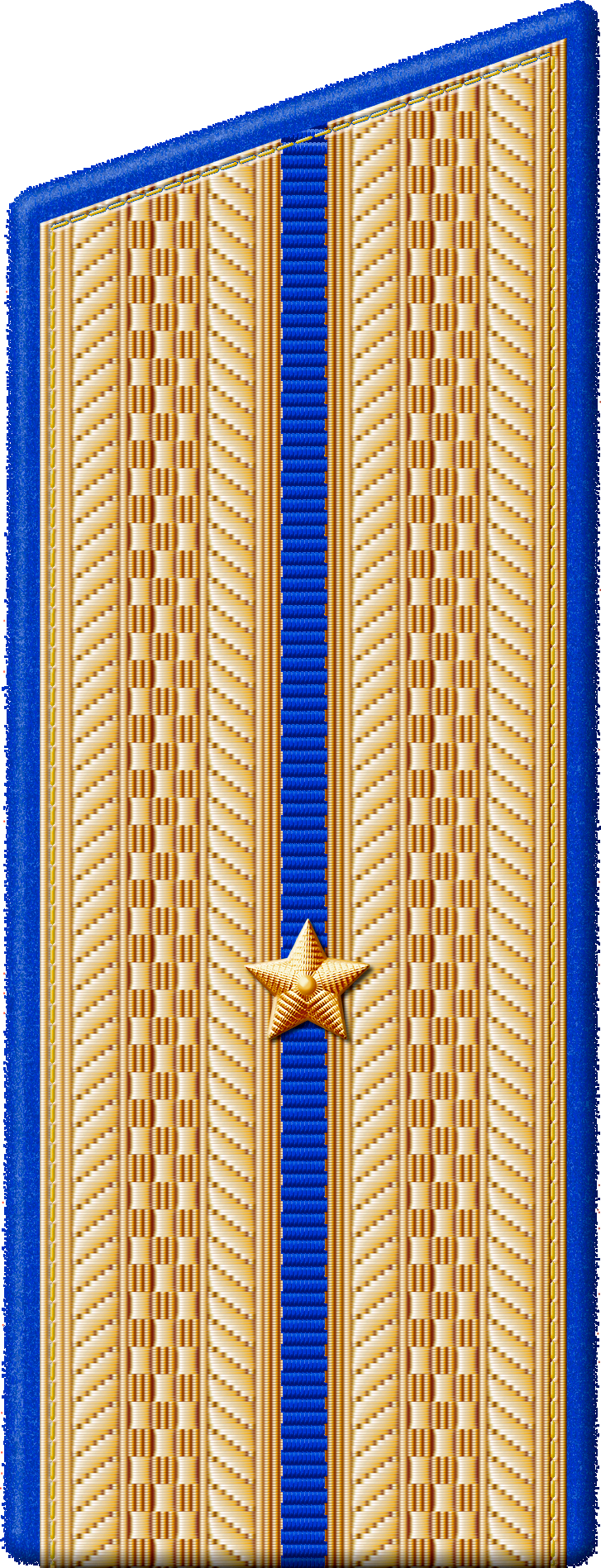
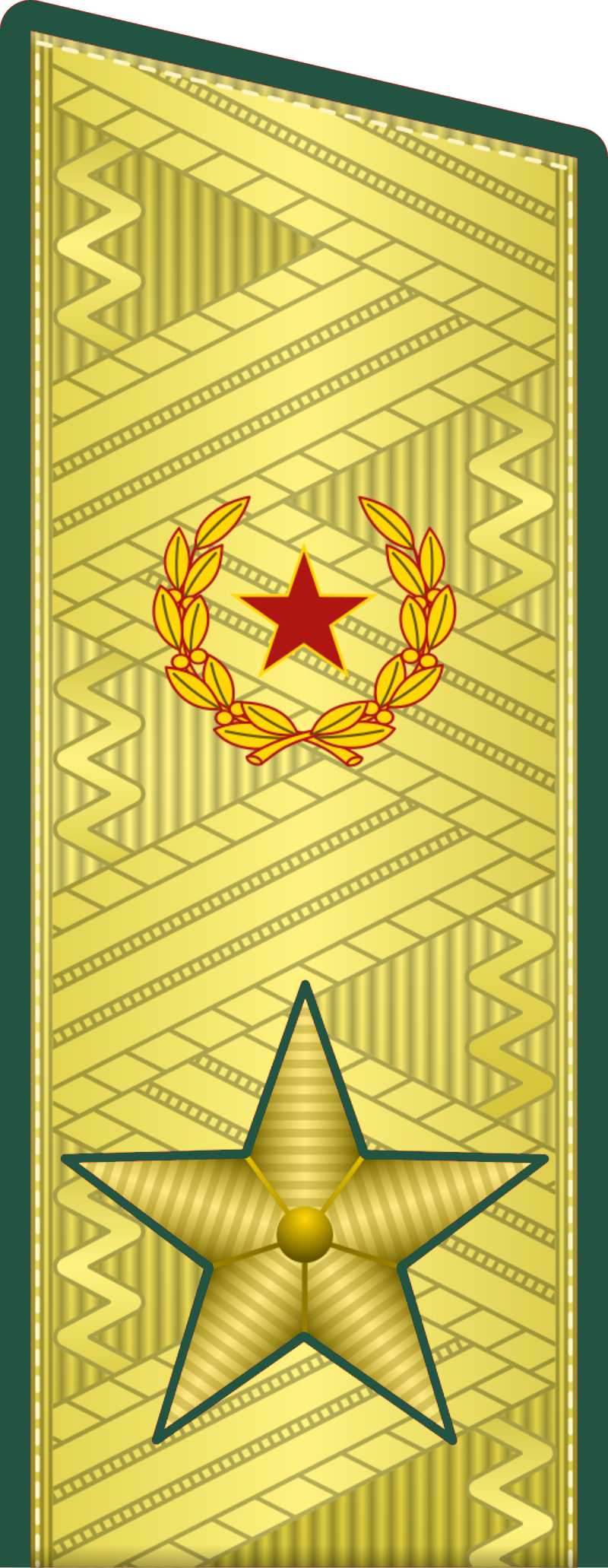
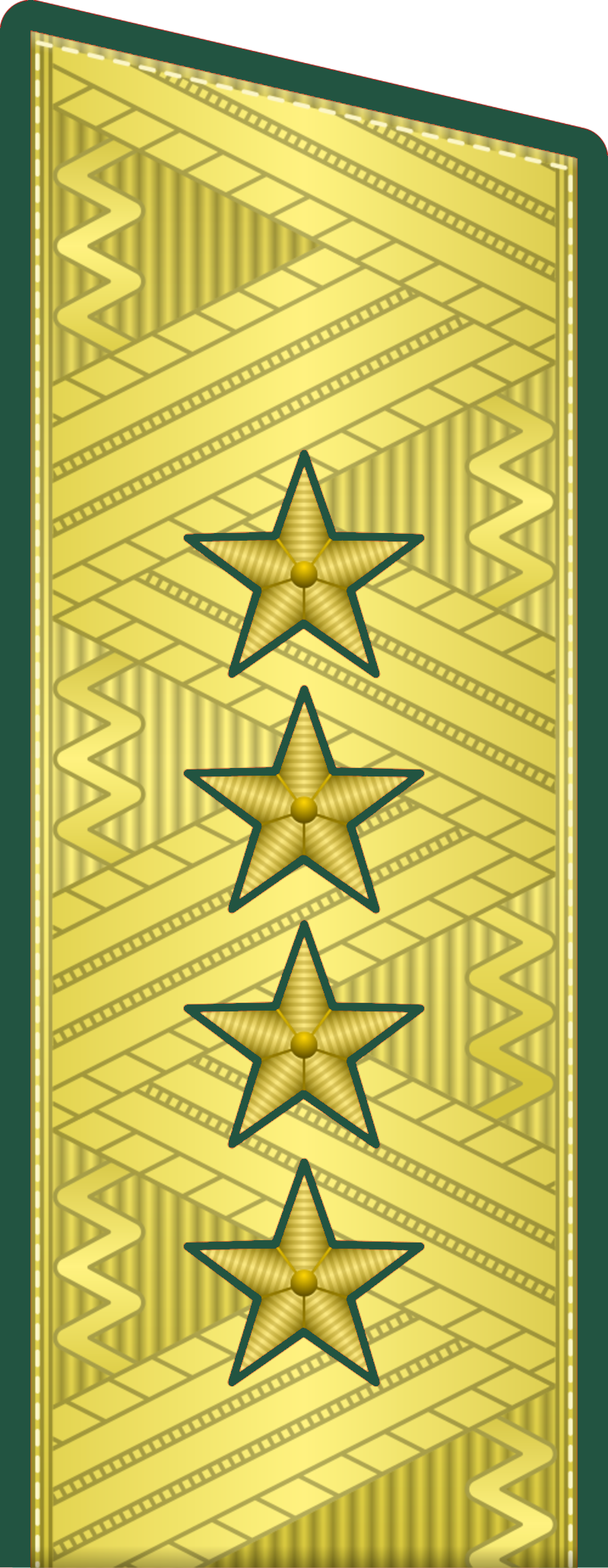
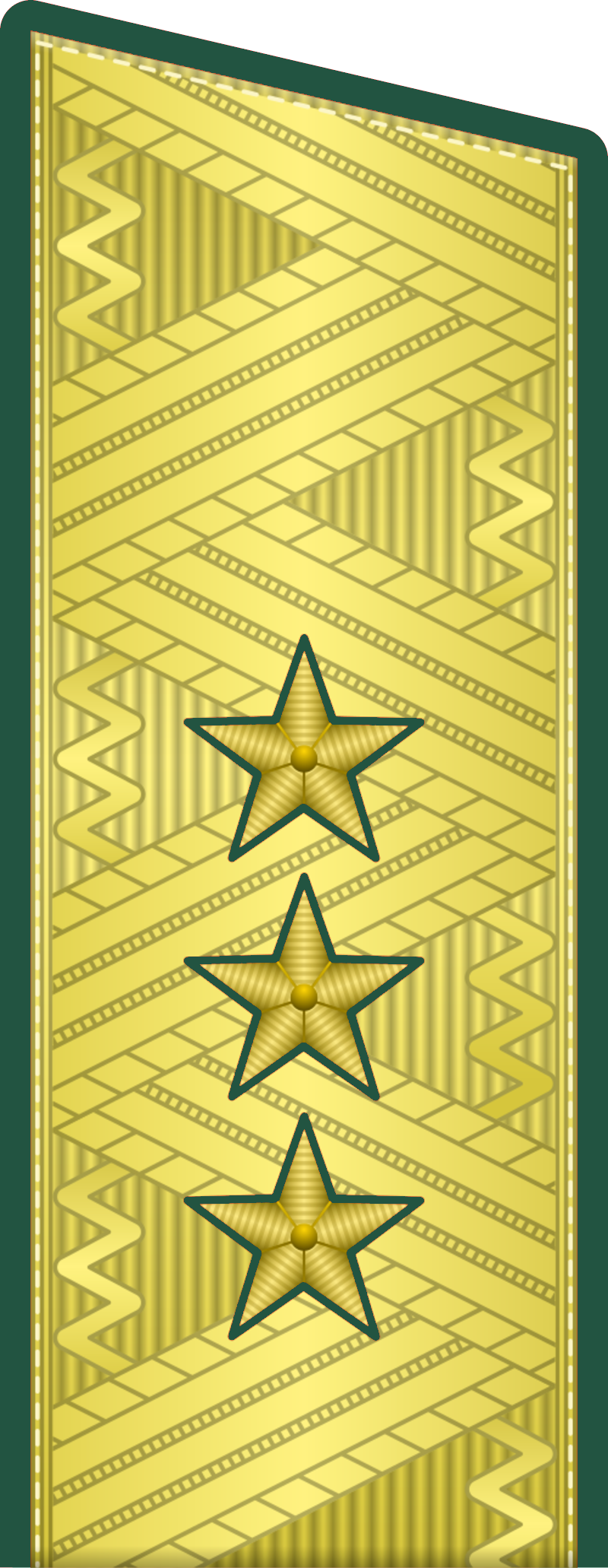
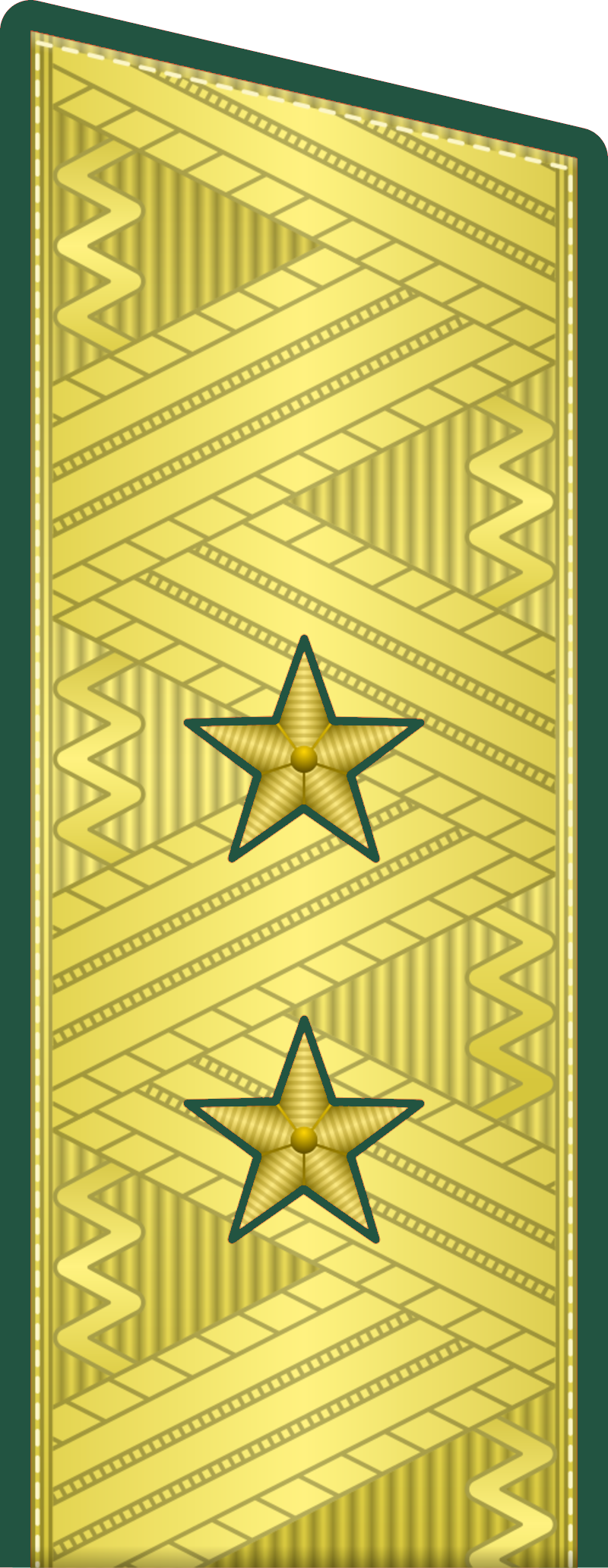
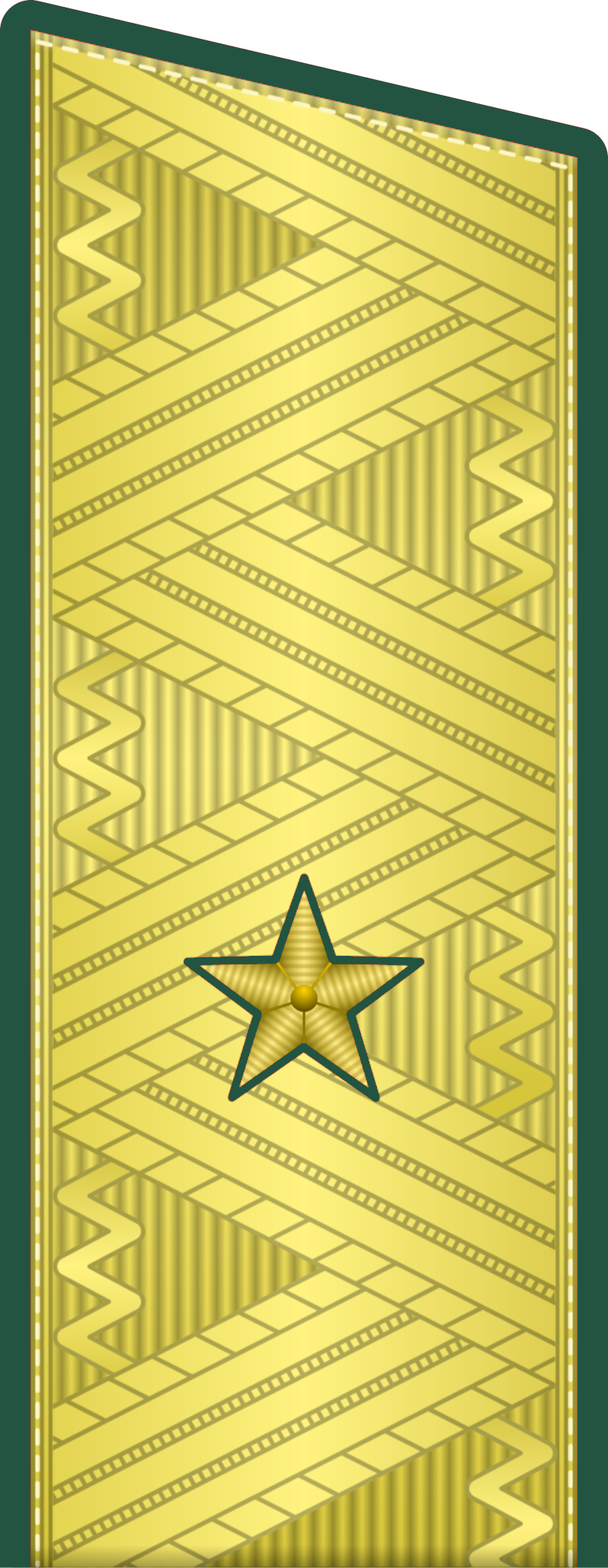
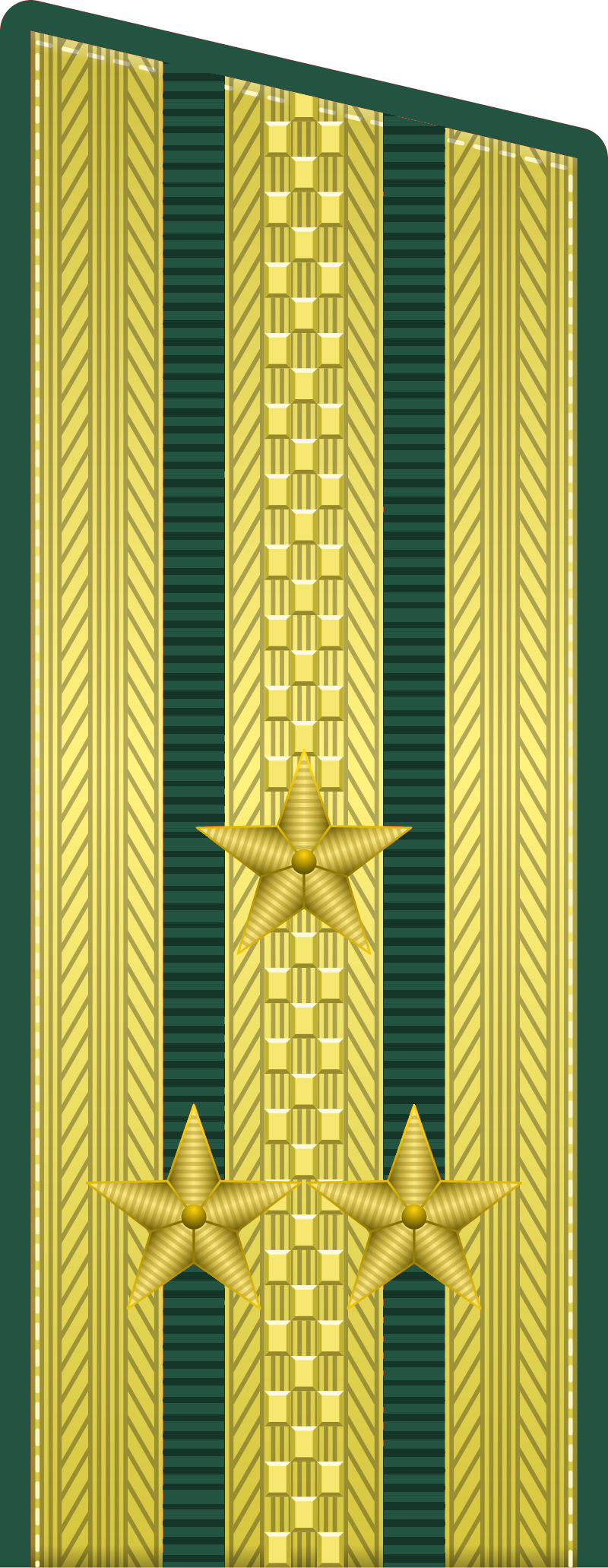
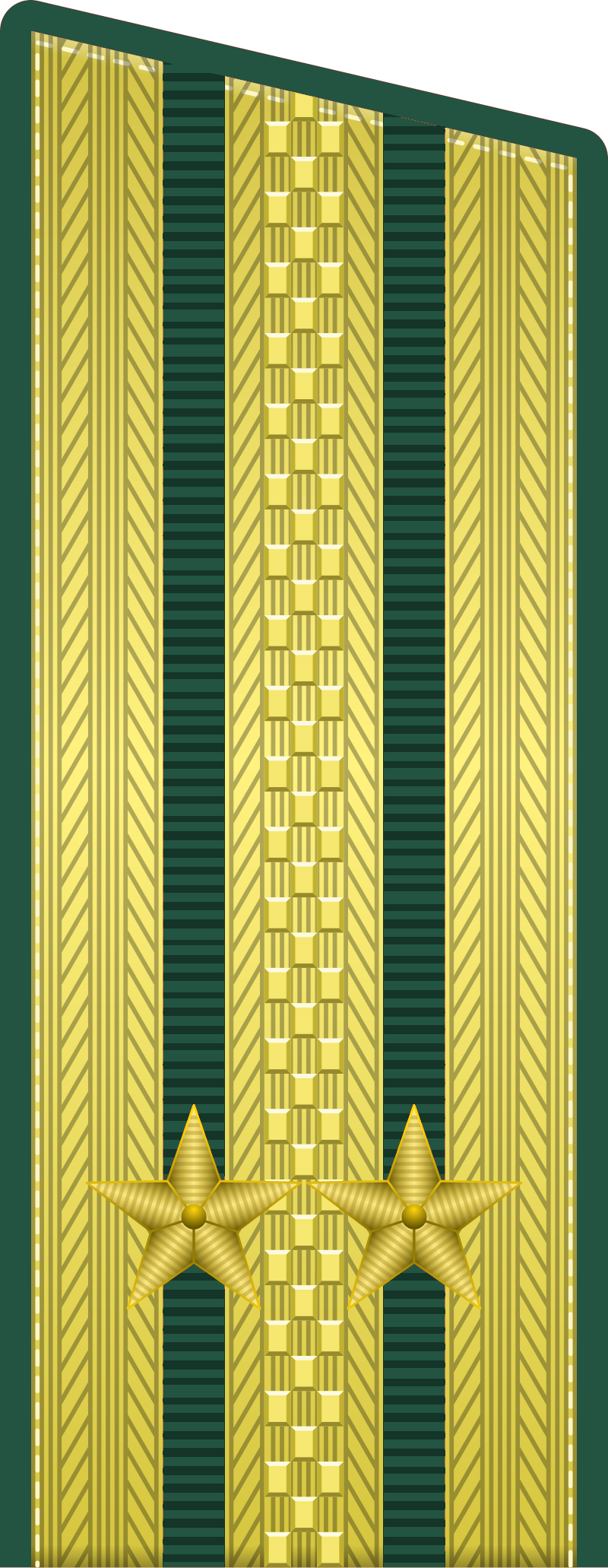
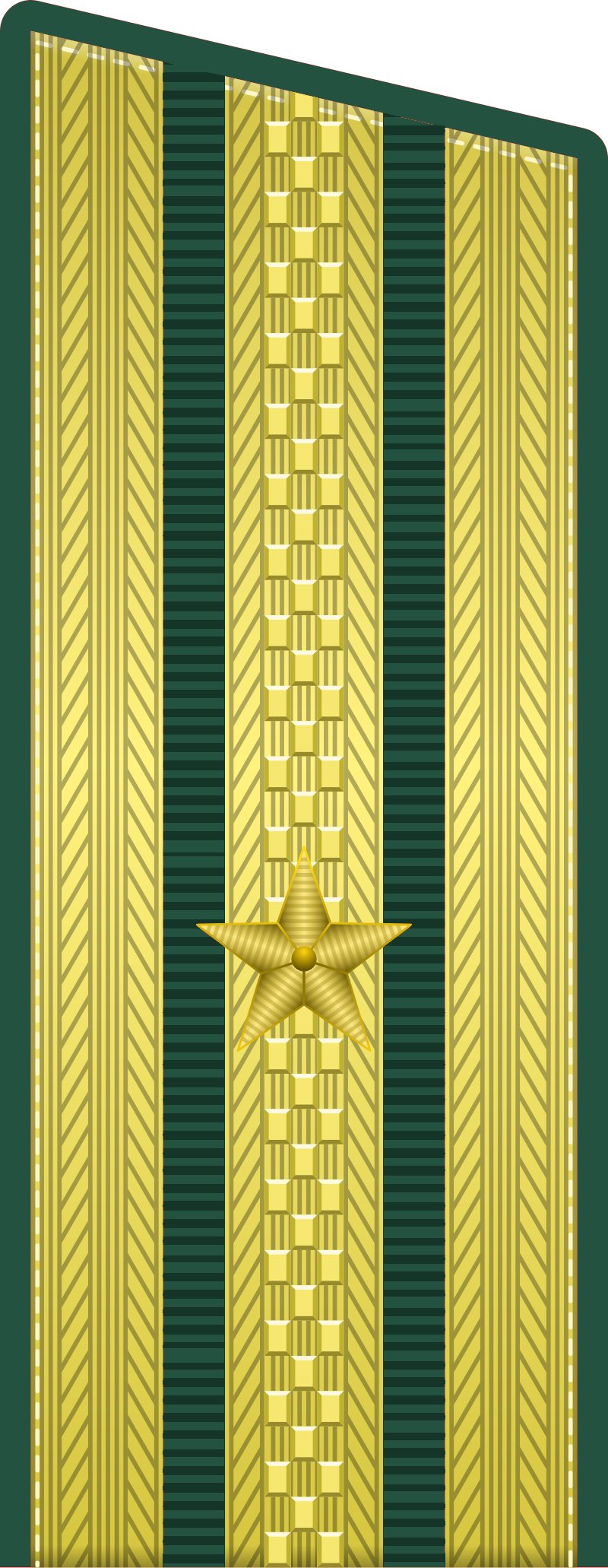
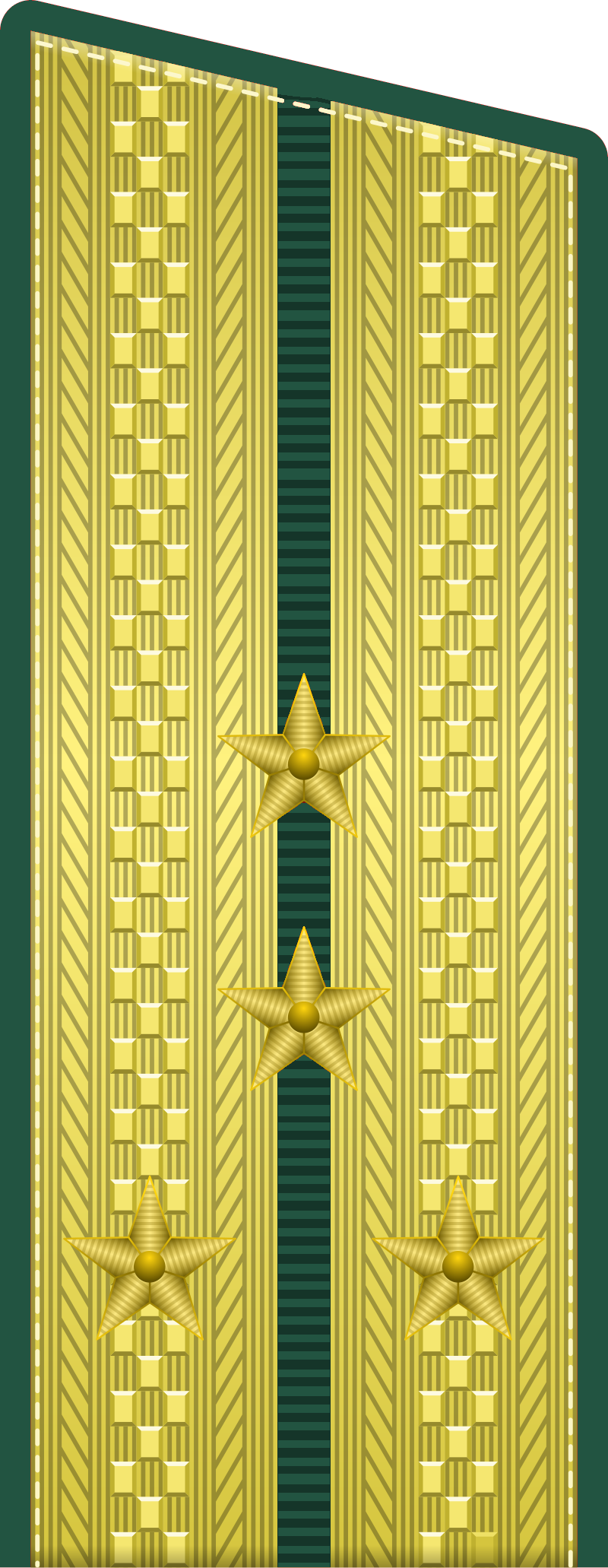
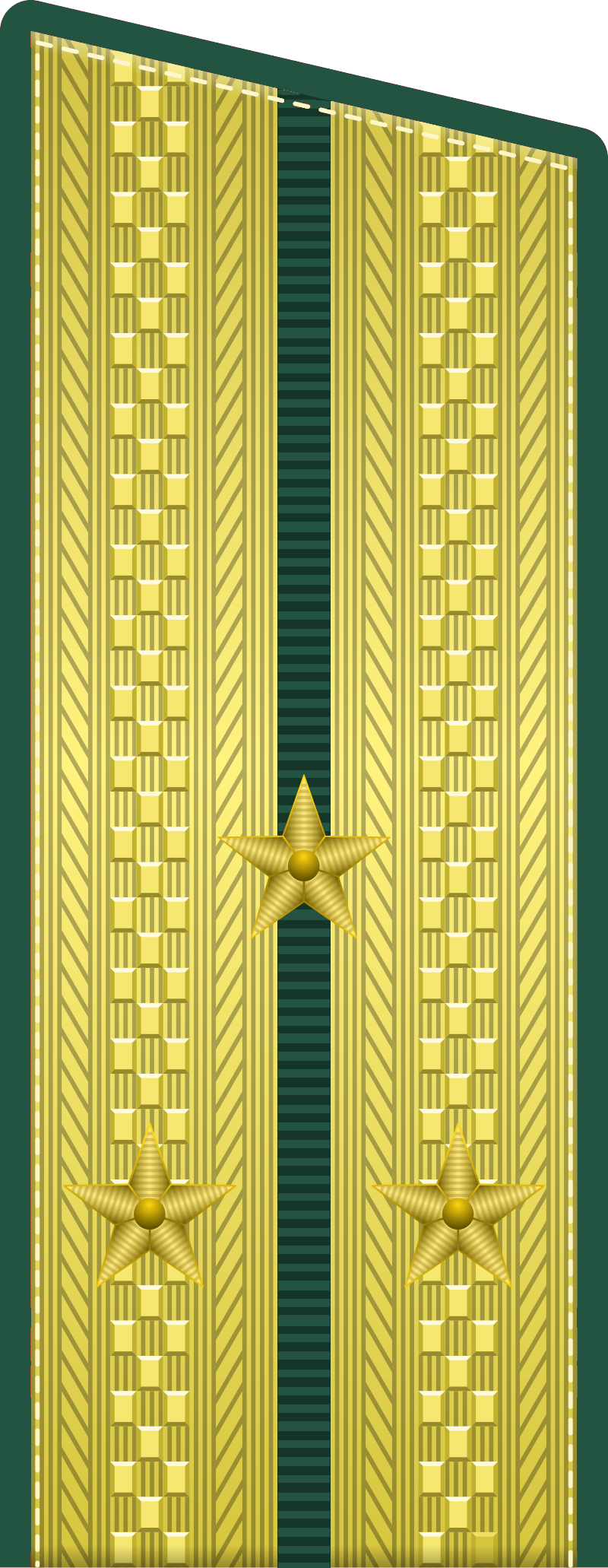
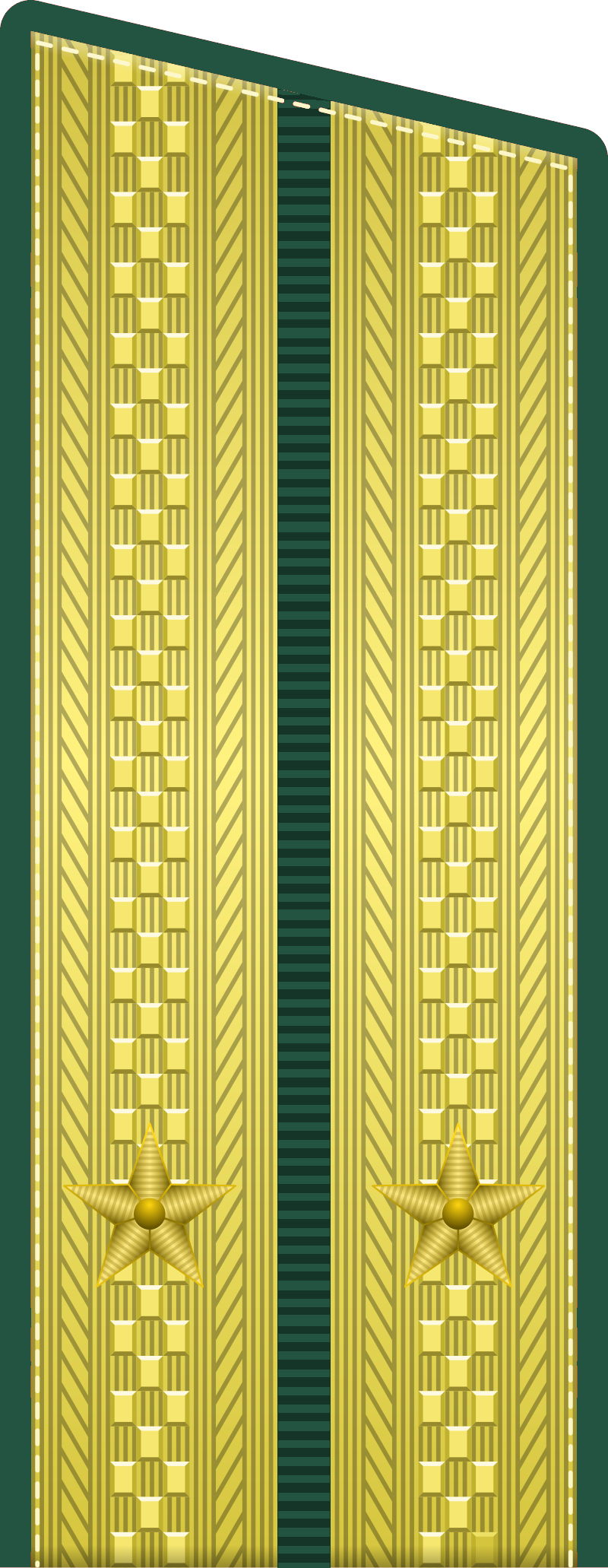
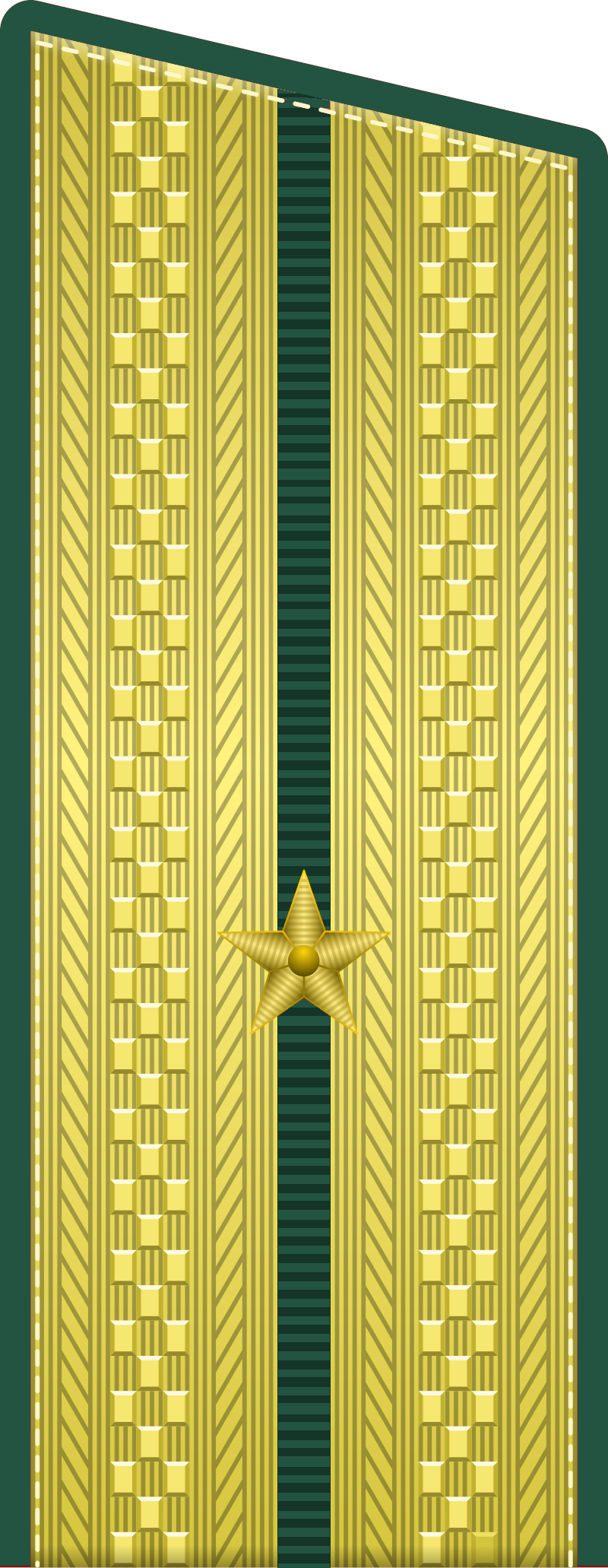
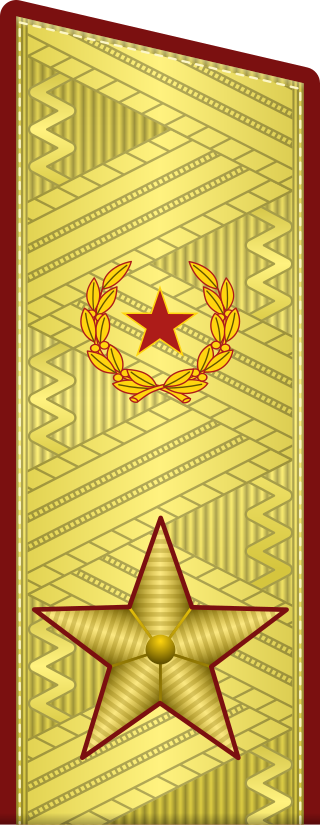
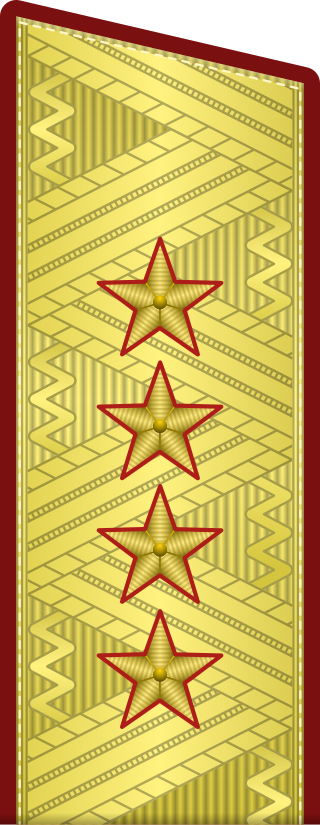
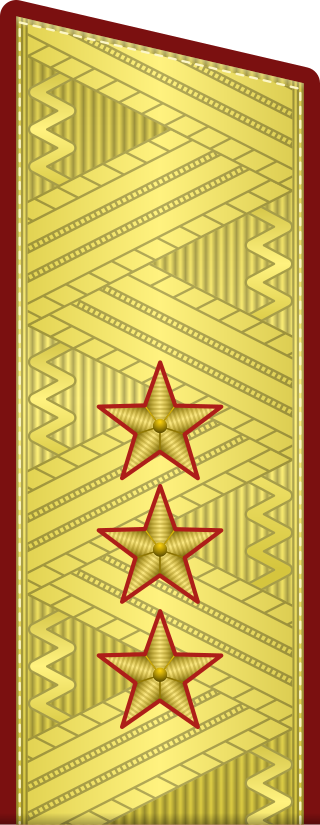
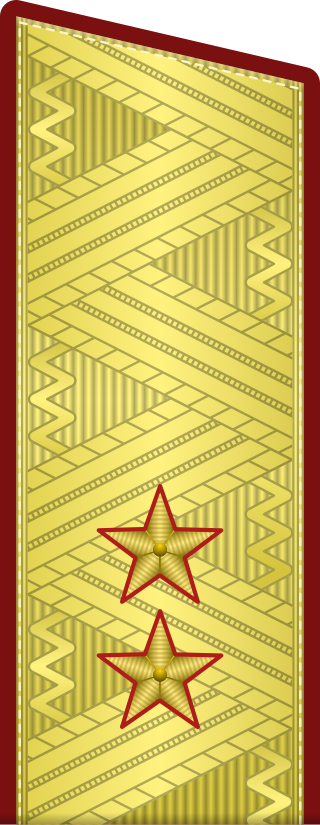
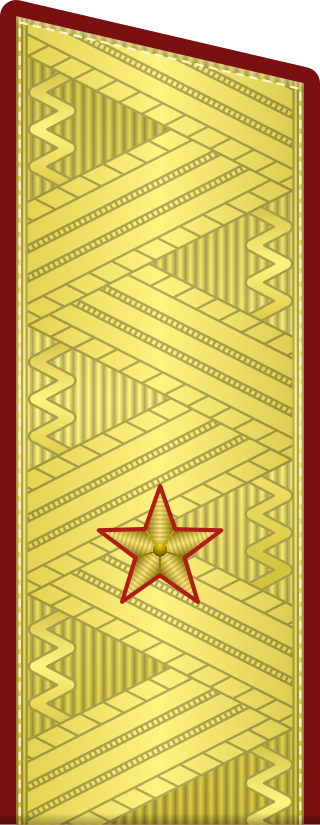
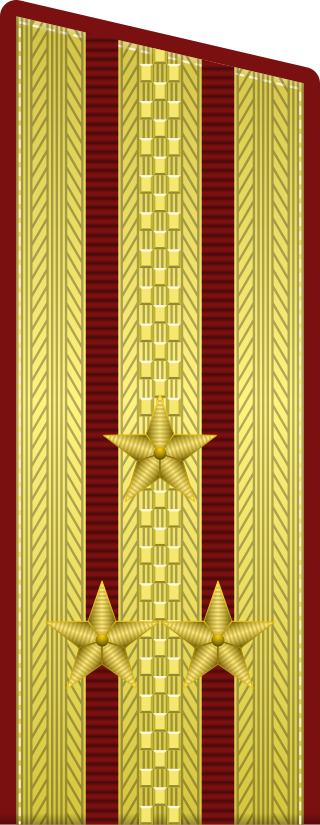
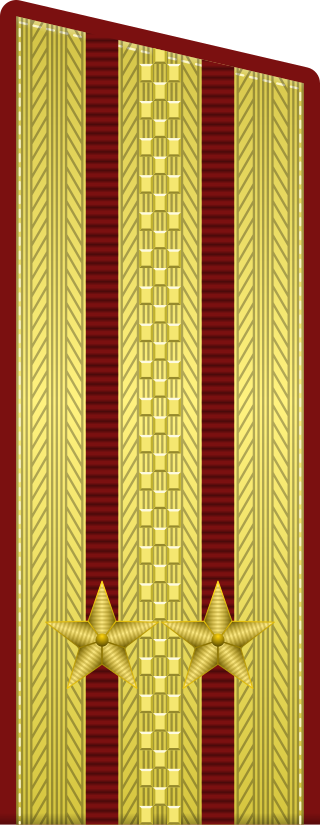
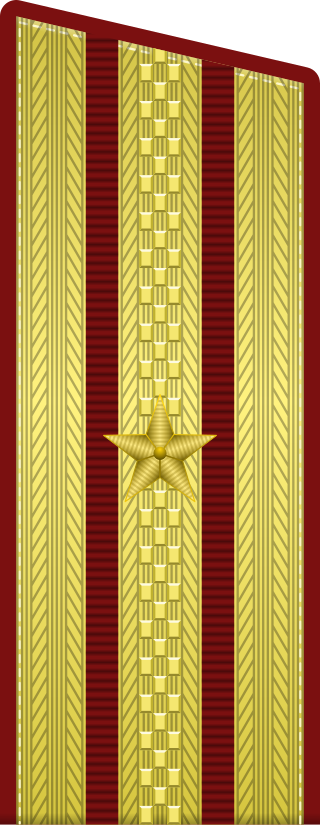
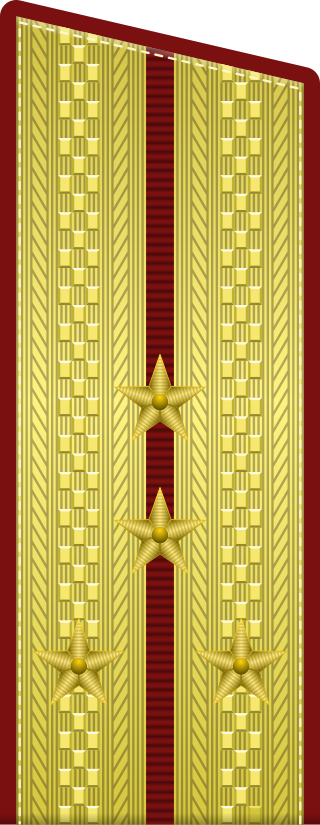
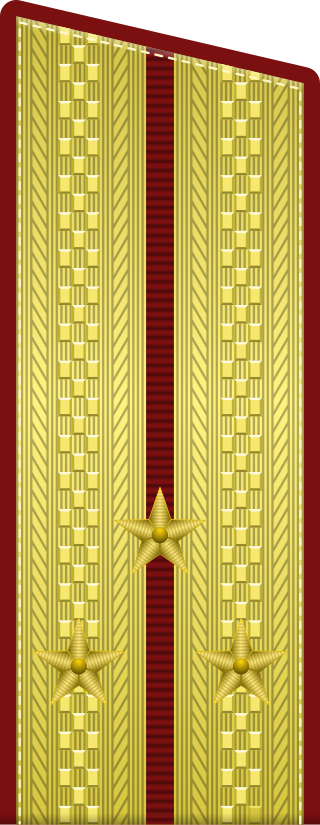
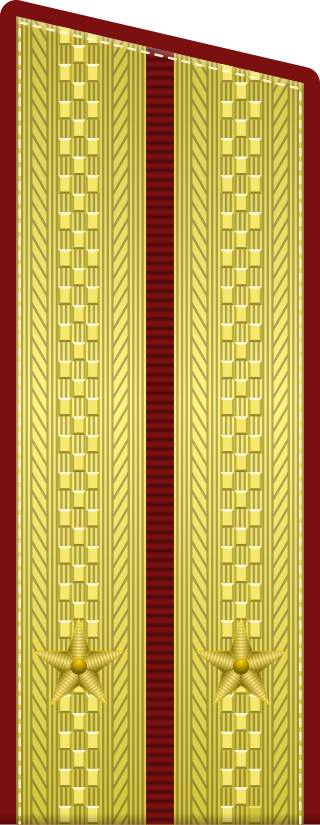
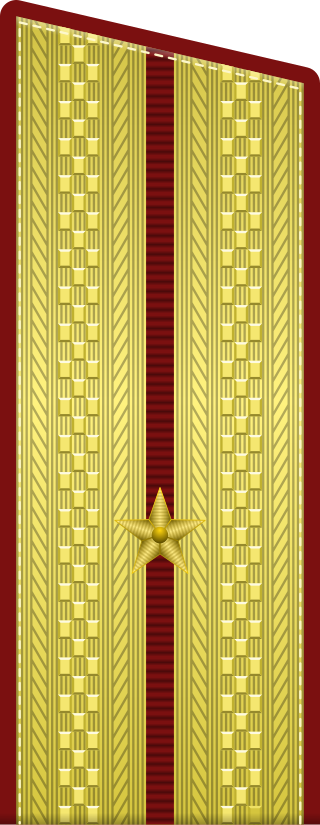
Rank group	General officers					Senior officers			Junior officers				Officer cadet
Parade Shoulder boards (Committee of State Security forces, KGB)
Parade Shoulder boards (Border Troops)
Parade Shoulder boards (Internal Troops)
	(from 1974)	(until 1974)
	Генера́л а́рмии Generál ármii		Генера́л-полко́вник Generál-polkóvnik	Генера́л-лейтена́нт Generál-leytenánt	Генера́л-майо́р Generál-mayór	Полко́вник Polkóvnik	Подполко́вник Podpolkóvnik	Майо́р Majór	Kапита́н Kapitán	Старший лейтена́нт Stárshiy leytenánt	Лейтенант Leytenant	Mла́дший лейтена́нт Mládshiy leytenánt	Курсант Kursant
US equivalent	General		Lieutenant general	Major general	Brigadier general	Colonel	Lieutenant colonel	Major	Captain	First lieutenant	Second lieutenant		Cadet / Officer candidate

== See also ==
- History of Russian military ranks
- Military ranks of the Soviet Union (1918–1935)
- Military ranks of the Soviet Union (1935–1940)
- Military ranks of the Soviet Union (1940–1943)
- Military ranks of the Soviet Union (1943–1955)
- Ranks and rank insignia of the Russian Federation´s armed forces 1994–2010
- Shoulder boards

== Bibliography ==
- Barker, A. J. (1976). Soviet Army Uniforms & Insignia 1945–1975. London: Arms & Armour. ISBN 0-85368-390-5.
- Soper, Karl Wheeler (1991). "Armed Forces and Defence Organization". In Zickel, Raymond E. (ed.). Soviet Union: a country study. Area Handbook (2nd ed.). Washington, D.C.: Library of Congress. pp. 695–753. LCCN 90025756.
