= Chief of the United States Army Reserve =

Commanding officer of the U.S. Army Reserve and its highest-ranking member

- Seal of the U.S. Army Reserve

- Flag of the U.S. Army Reserve

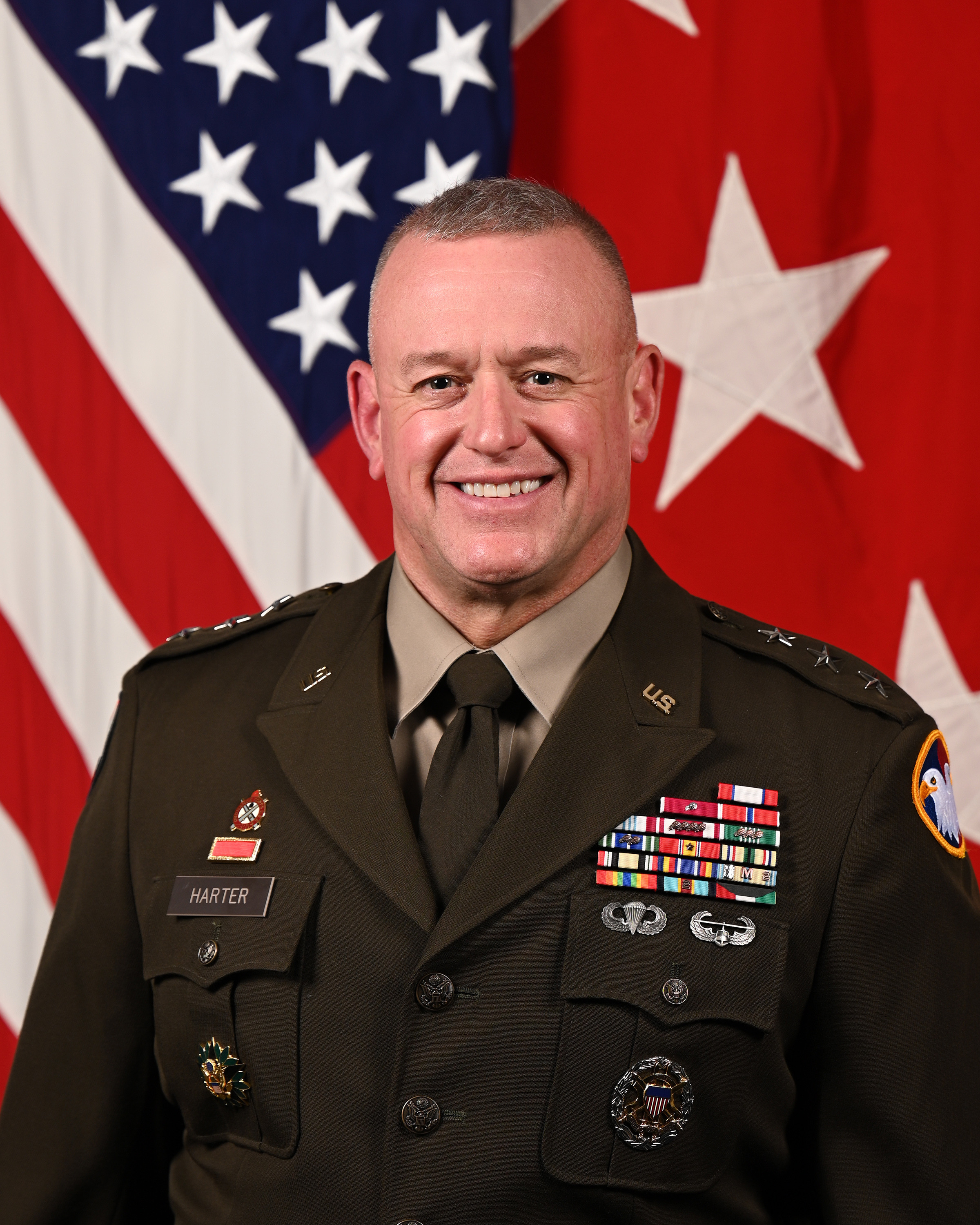
- Incumbent; Lieutenant General Robert Harter since 1 August 2024
- Office of the Chief of Army Reserve; Army Staff
- Type: Reserve component commander
- Abbreviation: CAR
- Member of: Reserve Forces Policy Board
- Reports to: Secretary of the Army (as Chief of Army Reserve); Chief of Staff of the United States Army (as Chief of Army Reserve); Commanding General, United States Army Forces Command (as Commanding General, U.S. Army Reserve Command)
- Seat: Office of the Chief of Army Reserve, Fort Bragg, North Carolina
- Appointer: The president with Senate advice and consent
- Term length: 4 years Renewable
- Constituting instrument: 10 U.S.C. § 7038
- Formation: 12 June 1923
- First holder: MAJ Charles F. Thompson (as Chief of Reserve Section, G-2); MG Frederick M. Warren (as Chief of Army Reserve)
- Deputy: Deputy Chief of Army Reserve
- Website: www.usar.army.mil

The chief of the United States Army Reserve (CAR) is the commanding officer of the United States Army Reserve, the reserve component of the United States Army. As the highest-ranking officer in the United States Army Reserve, the CAR is the principal advisor to the chief of staff of the Army on all matters relating to the Army Reserve, and is responsible for the personnel, operations and construction budgets of the Army Reserve, subject to the supervision and control of the secretary of the Army. Dual-hatted as Commanding General, United States Army Reserve Command, the CAR is also responsible to the Commanding General, United States Army Forces Command for the oversight of operationally-deployed Army Reserve forces.

By statute, the CAR is a member of the Army Staff, as well as one of five Army Reserve members of the Reserve Forces Policy Board. The CAR is also designated by statute as the executive agent for the Full Time Support Program, a personnel program under the Department of Defense. The Chief's headquarters is the Office of the Chief of Army Reserve, housed at Fort Bragg, North Carolina.

The 34th chief of the Army Reserve is Lieutenant General Robert Harter.

== Appointment and rank ==
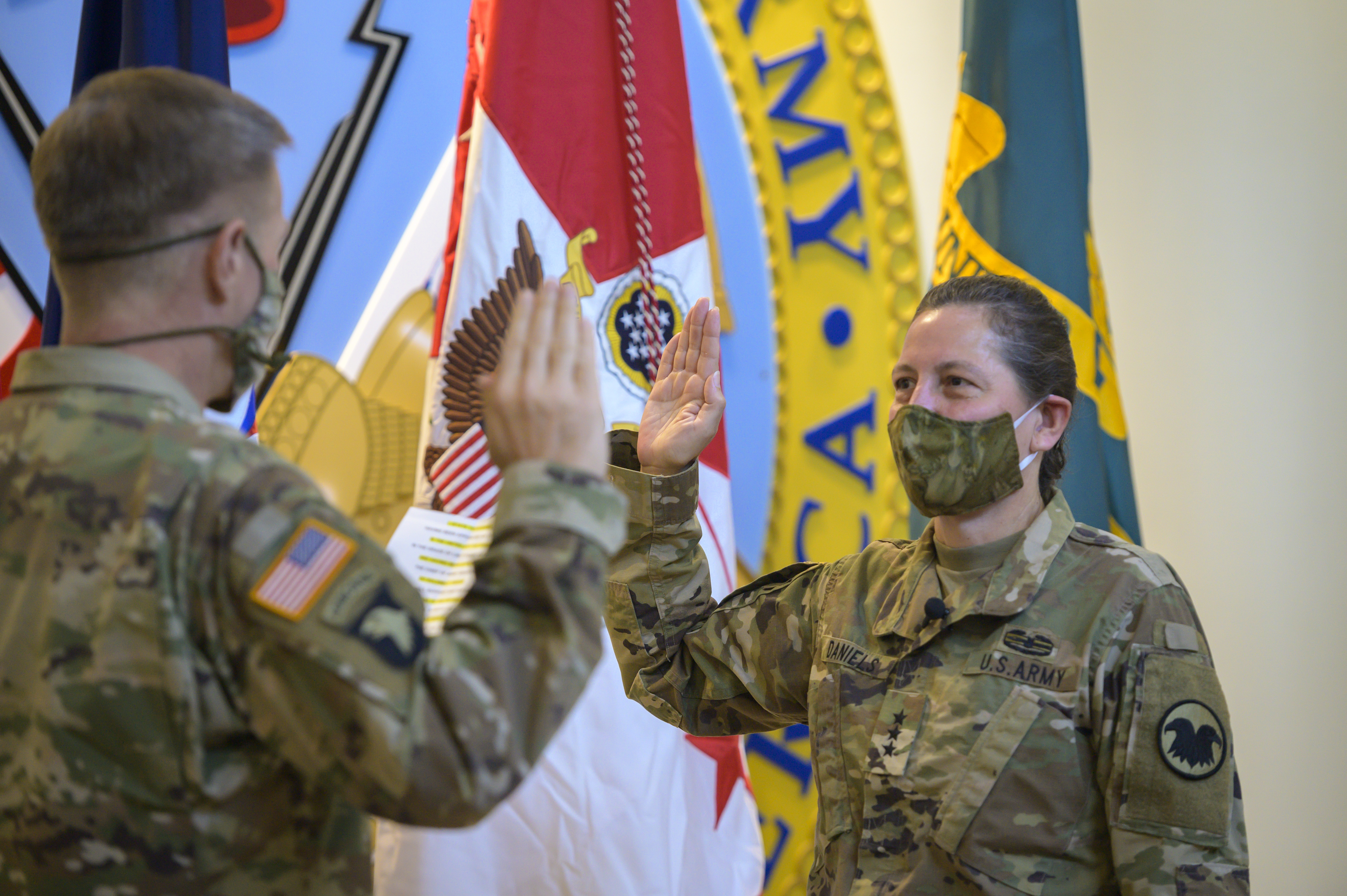
Jody J. Daniels is sworn in as the Chief of Army Reserve on 28 July 2020.

As an officer's appointment in the United States Armed Forces, the nominee requires confirmation by the United States Senate by majority vote. The chief of Army Reserve is nominated for appointment by the president of the United States with the advice and/or recommendation of the secretary of defense and secretary of the Army, as well as a determination from the chairman of the Joint Chiefs of Staff that the nominee has had significant joint duty experience.

Until 1968, the office of the chief of the Army Reserve was not set by statute due to concerns that institutionalizing a commander of Army reserve forces would separate it from the Regular Army, much like how the Militia Act of 1903 had rendered the early National Guard independent from the Regular Army. On 17 May 1968, Major General William J. Sutton was confirmed by the Senate in accordance with the passage of Pub. L. 90–168, thus making Sutton the first statutory Chief of Army Reserve.

The CAR's rank was initially that of major in 1923, and was successively raised to colonel in 1924, to brigadier general in 1933 (making Charles D. Herron the first CAR to hold general officer rank), and to major general in 1950. The CAR's rank, alongside those of reserve leaders of other service branches, was raised to lieutenant general in the National Defense Authorization Act of 2001, making Thomas J. Plewes, then chief of Army Reserve, the first to hold three-star rank. The statutory requirement for the CAR to hold the rank of lieutenant general was repealed in the 2017 NDAA, but the officeholder is still appointed to that rank.

The CAR serves for a four-year term, which can be renewed once for a total of eight years.

== List of officeholders ==
No.	Chief		Term		
No.	Portrait	Name	Took office	Left office	Term length
Chief of the Reserve Section, G-2
1	Charles F. Thompson	Major; Charles F. Thompson (1882–1954)	12 June 1923	1 July 1923	19 days
2	Walter O. Boswell	Major; Walter O. Boswell (1877–1953)	2 July 1923	31 July 1924	1 year, 29 days
Chief of the Reserve Branch, G-2
3	Douglas Potts	Colonel; Douglas Potts (1878–1940)	1 August 1924	30 December 1925	1 year, 151 days
4	John C. Pegram	Lieutenant Colonel; John C. Pegram (1881–1972)	31 December 1925	14 August 1926	226 days
5	Frederick B. Ryons	Lieutenant Colonel; Frederick B. Ryons (1877–1946)	15 August 1926	30 September 1926	46 days
6	Stanley H. Ford	Colonel; Stanley H. Ford (1877–1961)	1 October 1926	10 February 1927	132 days
Executive for Reserve Affairs
7	David L. Stone Jr.	Colonel; David L. Stone Jr. (1876–1959)	5 March 1927	30 June 1930	3 years, 117 days
8	Charles D. Herron	Brigadier General; Charles D. Herron (1877–1977)	1 July 1930	30 June 1935	4 years, 364 days
9	Edwin S. Hartshorn Sr.	Brigadier General; Edwin S. Hartshorn Sr. (1874–1963)	1 July 1935	15 September 1938	3 years, 76 days
10	Charles F. Thompson	Brigadier General; Charles F. Thompson (1882–1954)	16 September 1938	9 June 1940	1 year, 267 days
11	John H. Hester	Brigadier General; John H. Hester (1886–1976)	21 June 1940	23 March 1941	275 days
Executive for Reserve and ROTC Affairs
-	Frank E. Lowe	Colonel; Frank E. Lowe (1885–1968); Acting	24 March 1941	4 June 1941	72 days
12	Frank E. Lowe	Brigadier General; Frank E. Lowe (1885–1968)	5 June 1941	10 August 1942	1 year, 66 days
13	Edward W. Smith	Brigadier General; Edward W. Smith (1894–1966)	16 September 1942	14 October 1945	3 years, 28 days
14	Edward S. Bres	Brigadier General; Edward S. Bres (1888–1967)	15 October 1945	30 November 1947	2 years, 46 days
15	Wendell Westover	Brigadier General; Wendell Westover (1895–1960)	1 December 1947	14 November 1949	1 year, 348 days
16	James B. Cress	Major General; James B. Cress (1889–1967)	1 January 1950	31 January 1951	1 year, 30 days
17	Hugh M. Milton II	Major General; Hugh M. Milton II (1897–1987)	24 February 1951	18 November 1953	2 years, 267 days
18	Philip F. Lindeman Jr.	Major General; Philip F. Lindeman Jr. (1909–1988)	November 1953	6 December 1954	1 year, 17 days
Chief, Army Reserve and ROTC Affairs
18	Philip F. Lindeman Jr.	Major General; Philip F. Lindeman Jr. (1909–1988)	7 December 1954	31 July 1957	2 years, 236 days
19	Ralph A. Palladino	Major General; Ralph A. Palladino (1904–1981)	1 August 1957	31 May 1959	1 year, 303 days
20	Frederick M. Warren	Major General; Frederick M. Warren (1903–1986)	1 September 1959	12 February 1963	3 years, 164 days
Chief, Army Reserve
20	Frederick M. Warren	Major General; Frederick M. Warren (1903–1986)	13 February 1963	31 August 1963	199 days
21	William J. Sutton	Major General; William J. Sutton (1908–1972)	1 September 1963	31 May 1971	7 years, 272 days
22	J. Milnor Roberts Jr.	Major General; J. Milnor Roberts Jr. (1918–2009)	1 June 1971	31 May 1975	3 years, 364 days
23	Henry Mohr	Major General; Henry Mohr (1919–1997)	1 June 1975	31 May 1979	3 years, 364 days
24	William R. Berkman	Major General; William R. Berkman (1929–2014)	1 June 1979	31 July 1986	7 years, 60 days
-	Harry J. Mott III	Brigadier General; Harry J. Mott III (1929–2023); Acting	1 August 1986	30 November 1986	121 days
25	William F. Ward Jr.	Major General; William F. Ward Jr. (1928–2018)	1 December 1986	1 October 1990	3 years, 304 days
Chief, Army Reserve and Commanding General, U.S. Army Reserve Command
25	William F. Ward Jr.	Major General; William F. Ward Jr. (1928–2018)	1 October 1990	31 July 1991	303 days
26	Roger W. Sandler	Major General; Roger W. Sandler (1934–2026)	1 August 1991	31 January 1994	2 years, 183 days
27	Max Baratz	Major General; Max Baratz (born 1934)	1 February 1994	24 May 1998	4 years, 112 days
28	Thomas J. Plewes	Lieutenant General; Thomas J. Plewes (born 1940)	25 May 1998	24 May 2002	3 years, 364 days
29	James R. Helmly	Lieutenant General; James R. Helmly (born 1947)	25 May 2002	25 May 2006	4 years, 0 days
30	Jack C. Stultz Jr.	Lieutenant General; Jack C. Stultz Jr. (born 1952)	25 May 2006	9 June 2012	6 years, 15 days
31	Jeffrey W. Talley	Lieutenant General; Jeffrey W. Talley (born 1959)	9 June 2012	1 June 2016	4 years, 22 days
-	Michael R. Smith	Major General; Michael R. Smith; Acting	1 June 2016	30 June 2016	29 days
32	Charles D. Luckey	Lieutenant General; Charles D. Luckey (born 1955)	30 June 2016	2 July 2020	4 years, 2 days
-	Michael C. O'Guinn	Major General; Michael C. O'Guinn; Acting	3 July 2020	28 July 2020	25 days
33	Jody J. Daniels	Lieutenant General; Jody J. Daniels (born c. 1962)	28 July 2020	30 July 2024	4 years, 2 days
-	Deborah Kotulich	Major General; Deborah Kotulich (born 1968); Acting	30 July 2024	1 August 2024	2 days
34	Robert Harter	Lieutenant General; Robert Harter (born c. 1970)	1 August 2024	Incumbent	2 years, 37 days

== See also ==
- Office of the Chief of Army Reserve
- Command Chief Warrant Officer of the US Army Reserve
- Command Sergeant Major of the US Army Reserve
- Chief of the National Guard Bureau
- Vice Chief of the National Guard Bureau
- Army National Guard

== Sources ==
- Hilkert, David E. (December 2004). Chiefs of the Army Reserve: Biographical Sketches of the United States Army Reserve's Senior Officers. Fort McPherson, GA: Office of Army Reserve History, U.S. Army Reserve Command.
- "A History of the Office of Chief, Army Reserve" (PDF). Fort Bragg, NC: Office of the Chief of Army Reserve. April 2013.
