= Charles F. Thompson =

US Army major general

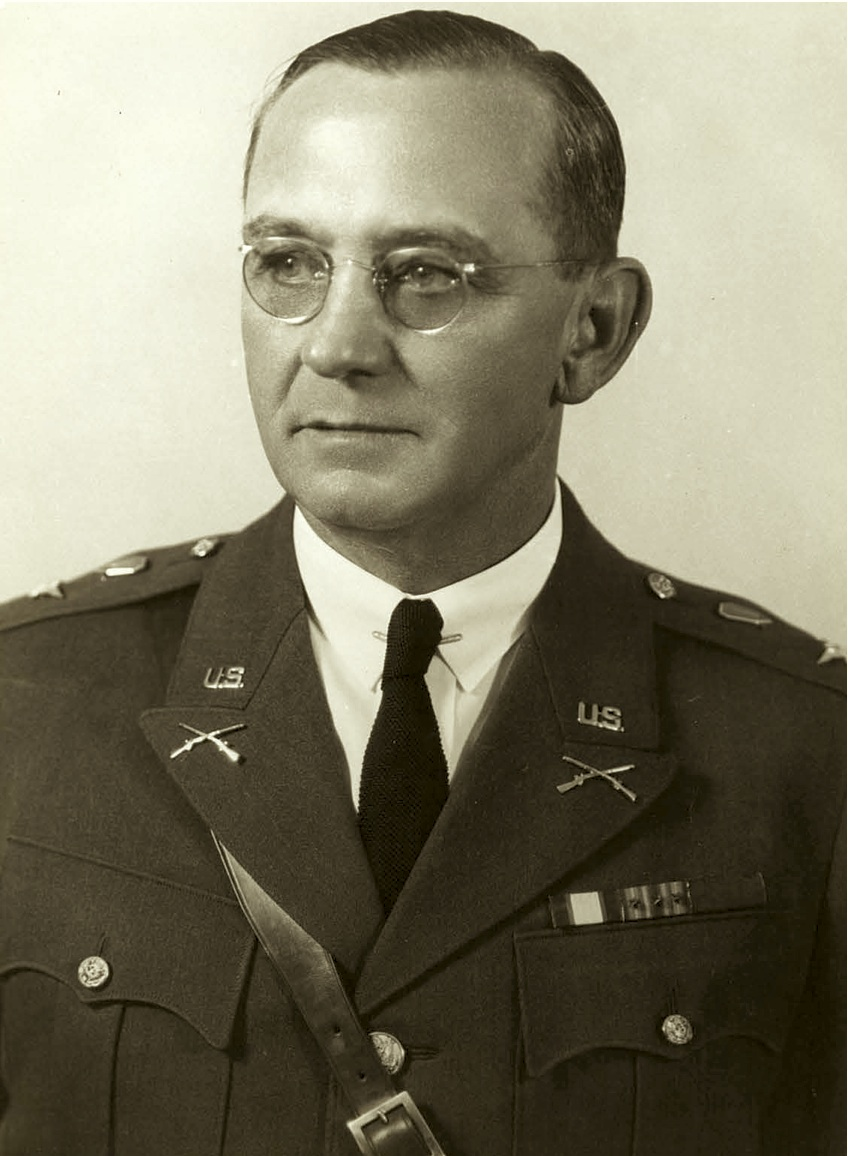
- Thompson as assistant commandant of the Infantry School, circa 1938
- Born: December 11, 1882; Jamestown, North Dakota
- Died: June 15, 1954 (aged 71); Washington, D.C., U.S.
- Burial place: Arlington National Cemetery
- Military career
- Allegiance: United States
- Branch: United States Army
- Service years: 1904–1945
- Rank: Major General
- Unit: U.S. Army Infantry Branch
- Commands: 30th Infantry Regiment; Presidio of San Francisco; 3rd Infantry Regiment; 3rd Infantry Division; I Corps; Infantry Replacement Center, Camp Croft, South Carolina; II Islands Command; Military District of Washington; Patient Detachment, Walter Reed General Hospital; Chief of the United States Army Reserve
- Conflicts: Mexican Border War; World War I World War II
- Awards: Army Distinguished Service Medal (3)

Charles F. Thompson (December 11, 1882 – June 15, 1954) was a career officer in the United States Army. A veteran of World War I and World War II, he attained the rank of major general and was notable as the first Chief of the United States Army Reserve and for his command of 3rd Infantry Division and I Corps.

A native of Jamestown, North Dakota, Thompson graduated from the United States Military Academy in 1904. He served in Infantry assignments in the United States and the Philippines at the start of his career, and was posted to the Texas-Mexico border during the Mexican Border War. During World War I, Thompson served as an intelligence staff officer on the American Expeditionary Force staff and the staffs of both First and Second U.S. Armies. From 1921 to 1924, Thompson served as chief of the Press Relations section in the Intelligence (G-2) division of the Army staff and in 1923 he performed additional duty as head of Army Reserve affairs, the first officer to hold the position.

In the 1930s and 1940s, Thompson served in the United States and Philippines, including command of the 30th Infantry Regiment, 3rd Infantry Regiment, and 3rd Infantry Division. In addition, he was assigned for the second time as Chief of the United States Army Reserve. During World War II, he commanded I Corps, the Infantry Replacement Center at Camp Croft, South Carolina, the II Islands Command in the Pacific, and the Military District of Washington.

After the war, Thompson commanded the Patient Detachment at Walter Reed General Hospital. He retired in late 1945 and was a resident of Washington, D.C. Thompson died in Washington on June 15, 1954, and was buried at Arlington National Cemetery.

== Early life ==
Charles Fullington Thompson was born in Jamestown, North Dakota on December 11, 1882, the son of John Justin Thompson and Ida May (Fullington) Thompson. Thompson was educated in the schools of Jamestown and was an 1899 graduate of Jamestown High School. He attended the University of Michigan from 1899 to 1900, then transferred to the United States Military Academy.

Thompson played on the offensive and defensive lines for the West Point football team. A large, athletic man, he was nicknamed "Big Charlie" and maintained a notably fit appearance even during the late stages of his career. In an incident recalled by Admiral William Halsey Jr. when he and Thompson met during World War II, Halsey played halfback for the Naval Academy team in the 1904 Army-Navy game. Thompson repeatedly tackled Halsey after Halsey ran for minimal gains, and Army won 11–0. Thompson graduated in 1904 ranked 79th of 124, and received his commission as a second lieutenant of Infantry.

== Start of career ==
Thompson was initially assigned to the 13th Infantry Regiment at Fort McDowell, California. From 1905 to 1907 he served with his regiment during deployment to the Philippines, based first at Fort William McKinley near Manila, and later in Parang. Thompson served at West Point as assistant athletic officer from August to December 1907, after which he rejoined the 13th Infantry at Fort Leavenworth, Kansas. Thompson received promotion to first lieutenant in March 1909, and was assigned to temporary duty with the ad hoc Maneuver Division, a collection of Army units posted to the Texas-Mexico Border to maintain order during the Mexican Border War. From 1911 to 1914, Thompson served again in the Philippines as a member of the 13th Infantry.

In 1914, Thompson transferred to the 16th Infantry, then based in El Paso, Texas. In 1915, he was posted to West Point, where he served briefly as the football coach. Later that year, Thompson was assigned to Cornell University as professor of military science. He was promoted to captain in July 1916.

== World War I ==
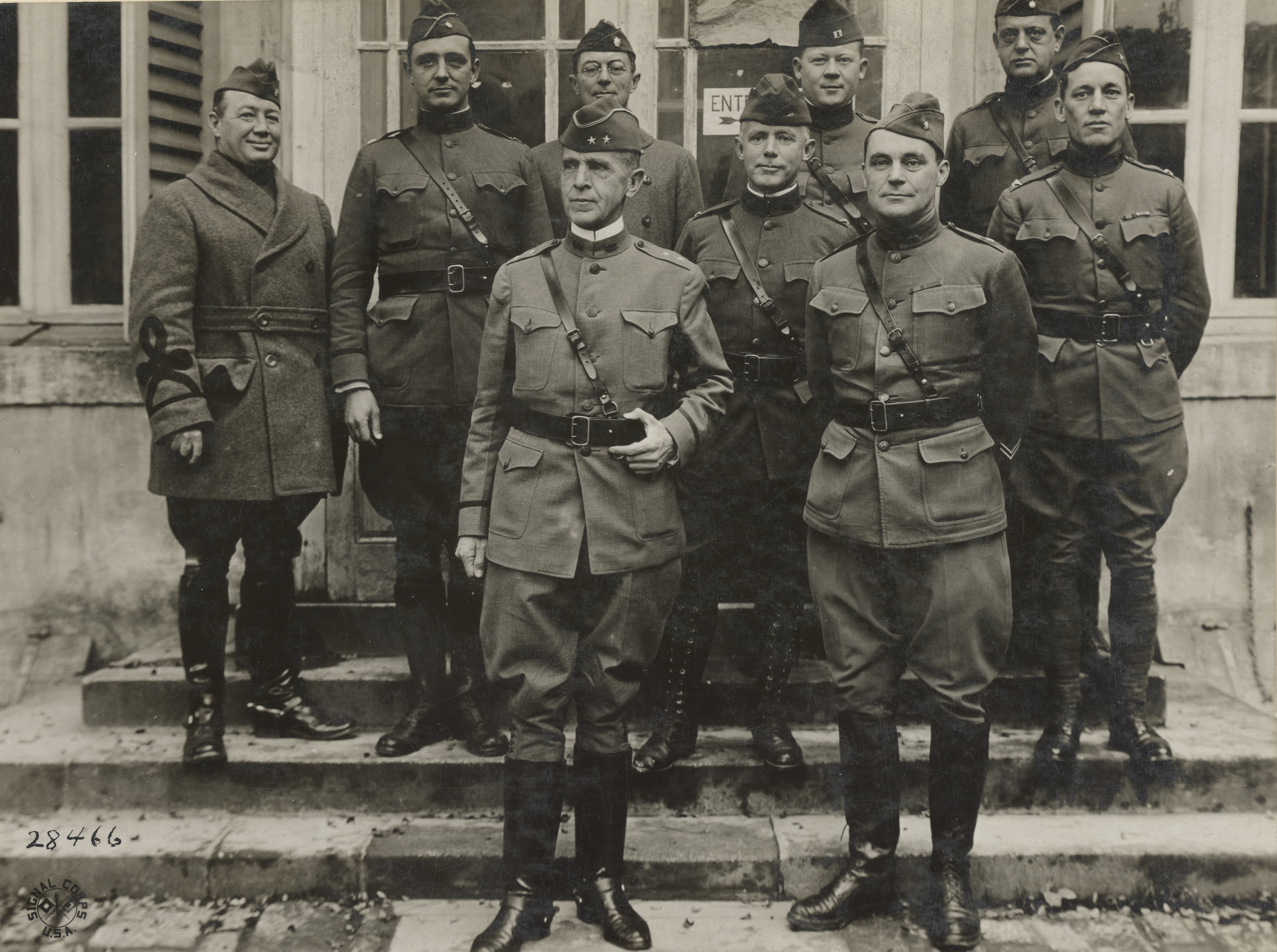
Major General Robert Lee Bullard, the newly appointed commander of the U.S. Second Army, pictured here with members of his staff at Second Army's headquarters at Toul, Meurthe-et-Moselle, France, October 20, 1918. Stood in the second row, second from the left, is Lieutenant Colonel Charles F. Thompson, his G-2.

From June to August 1917, Thompson was assigned to the 38th Infantry in Syracuse, New York as it organized and trained in anticipation of U.S. entry into World War I. He was promoted to temporary major on August 5, then assigned as a small arms instructor at Fort Sill, Oklahoma. From September to December 1917, Thompson was adjutant and assistant chief of staff of the 82nd Division as it completed its organization and training at Camp Gordon, Georgia.

After arriving in France in February 1918, Thompson was assigned to the Intelligence staff section (G-2) of the American Expeditionary Force headquarters. From July to September 1918, Thompson was assistant chief of staff for Intelligence on the staff of the First Army. He participated in both the Aisne-Marne offensive and the Battle of Saint-Mihiel. From September 1918 to April 1919, Thompson served as G-2 for the Second Army, which included post-war occupation of the Toul sector. He was promoted to temporary lieutenant colonel in October 1918.

As Second Army G-2, Thompson was credited with developing techniques for acquiring and graphically depicting intelligence which are now considered standard. In mid-October 1918, the AEF G-2 issued a graphic German order of battle, which depicted German army group and army dispositions from the North Sea to Switzerland down to the division level. Using his own assets and analysis, Thompson created and disseminated a graphic intelligence summary portrayed on a 1:100,000 scale map that broke down into regimental sectors the disposition of the eight German divisions facing Second Army. Thompson then added operational details, including incidents of German poison gas attacks, artillery fire, patrols, and machine gun fire. Surveys of the front during the war and post-war analysis confirmed the accuracy of Thompson's intelligence summary, which proved useful to Second Army units as they carried out the war's final offensive.

For his wartime service, Thompson was a recipient of the Army Distinguished Service Medal. The citation for the medal reads:

The President of the United States of America, authorized by Act of Congress, July 9, 1918, takes pleasure in presenting the Army Distinguished Service Medal to Lieutenant Colonel (Infantry) Charles Fullington Thompson, United States Army, for exceptionally meritorious and distinguished services to the Government of the United States, in a duty of great responsibility during World War I. As Assistant Chief of Staff, G-2, of the 1st Army, Lieutenant Colonel Thompson aided in its organization by his skill and sound judgment, participating in the preliminary preparations and operations at the St. Mihiel salient. The successes achieved by his section are largely due to his high military attainments, his great energy, and painstaking devotion to duty. He served with equal ability as G-2 of the 2d Army in September 1918, at all times showing great skill and accomplishing results of exceptional value.

In addition, he received the Legion of Honor (Chevalier) from the government of France.

== Post-World War I ==
In April and May 1919, Thompson served with the American Relief Administration, helping oversee distribution of food and other emergency aid to help European countries in their post-war recovery. He was promoted to temporary colonel in May 1919. After returning to the United States, Thompson was assigned to the West Point faculty as an instructor in the Department of Tactics. In August 1919, he was reduced to his permanent rank of captain. In July 1920, he was promoted to permanent major.

Thompson was assigned as assistant to the chief of staff for the Fifth Corps Area at Fort Benjamin Harrison, Indiana in September 1920. He was subsequently assigned as G-2, and he remained on the Fifth Corps Area staff until September 1921. In August 1921, Thompson was part of the contingent of troops that attempted to restore order among striking coal miners in West Virginia and he testified at the May 1922 trial of organizer Bill Blizzard. From September 1921 to July 1924, Thompson served as chief of the Press Relations section in the G-2 division of the Army staff. From June to July 1923, he performed the additional duty of chief of the Reserve section, making him the first officer to serve as head of what is now the United States Army Reserve.

== Continued career ==
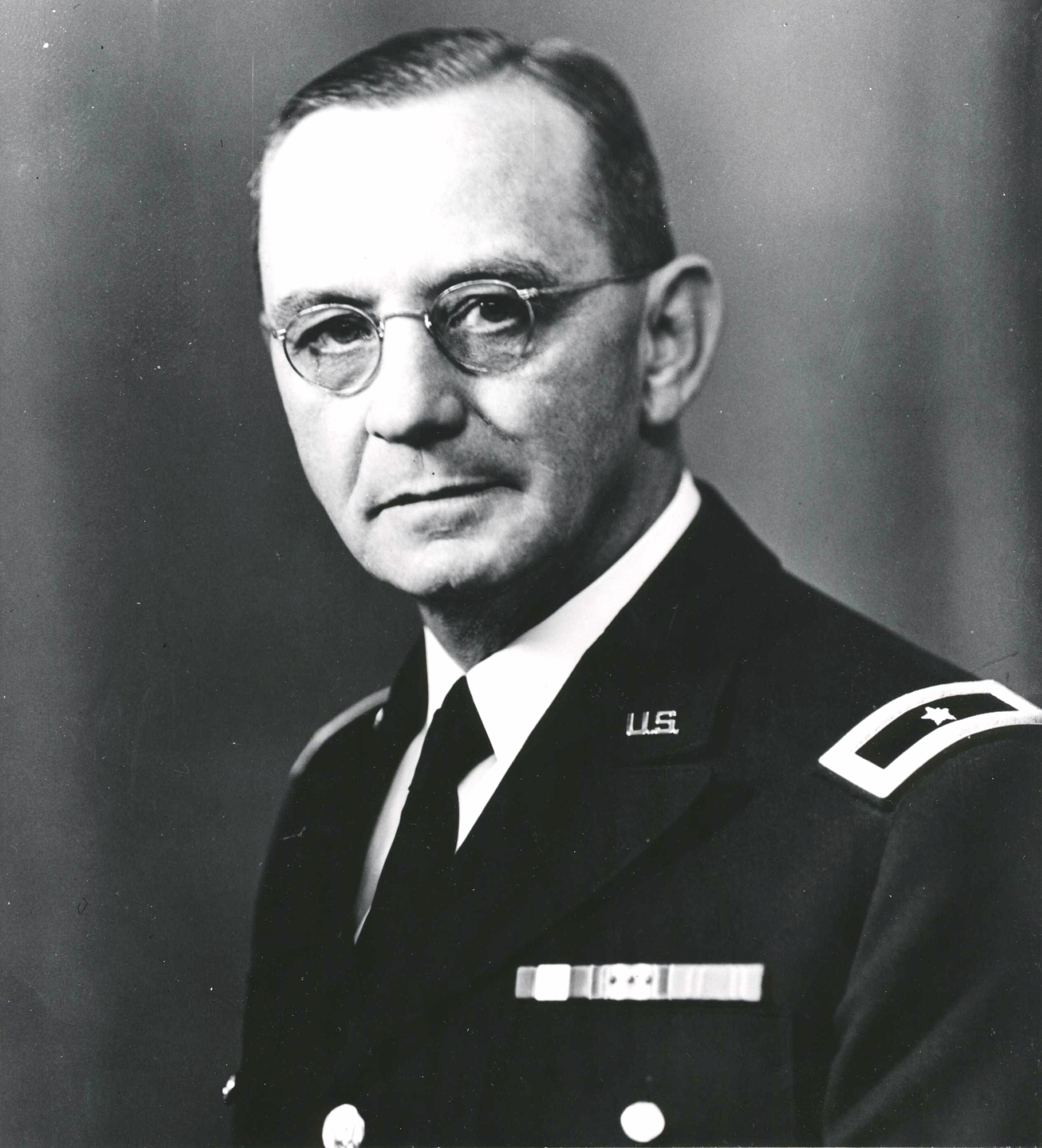
Thompson as a brigadier general and commander of the 3rd Infantry Division in mid-1940

In August 1924, Thompson began attendance at the United States Army Command and General Staff College, which he completed as a distinguished graduate in June 1925. After serving as an advisor to National Guard units during their annual training at Fort Eustis, Virginia in the summer of 1925, he began the course of study at the United States Army War College in August. He graduated in August 1925, after which he resumed his former duties as head of the Press Relations section for the Army G-2. Thompson remained in this position until June 1919, and was promoted to lieutenant colonel in August 1928.

In July 1929, Thompson was assigned as executive officer of the 30th Infantry Regiment and the post headquarters at the Presidio of San Francisco. He was temporary commander of the regiment and the post from September 1930 to January 1931, after which he returned to his executive officer duties. In October 1931, Thompson was posted to the Philippines and assigned as assistant chief of staff for the Philippine Department. He returned to the United States in May 1934 and was assigned as an Army Reserve advisor for the Ninth Corps Area, based at the Presidio of San Francisco. From September 1934 to April 1936, Thompson was assigned as professor of military science at Oregon State University. He was promoted to colonel in August 1935.

From April 1936 to January 1937, Thompson commanded the 3rd Infantry Regiment at Fort Snelling, Minnesota. In February 1937, he was assigned as assistant commandant of the Infantry School at Fort Benning, Georgia. In June 1938, Thompson was assigned to the staff of the Army Chief of Staff. He remained in this position until September 15, and was promoted to brigadier general on September 1. From September 1938 to June 1940, he was again assigned as the head of the Army Reserve.

== World War II ==
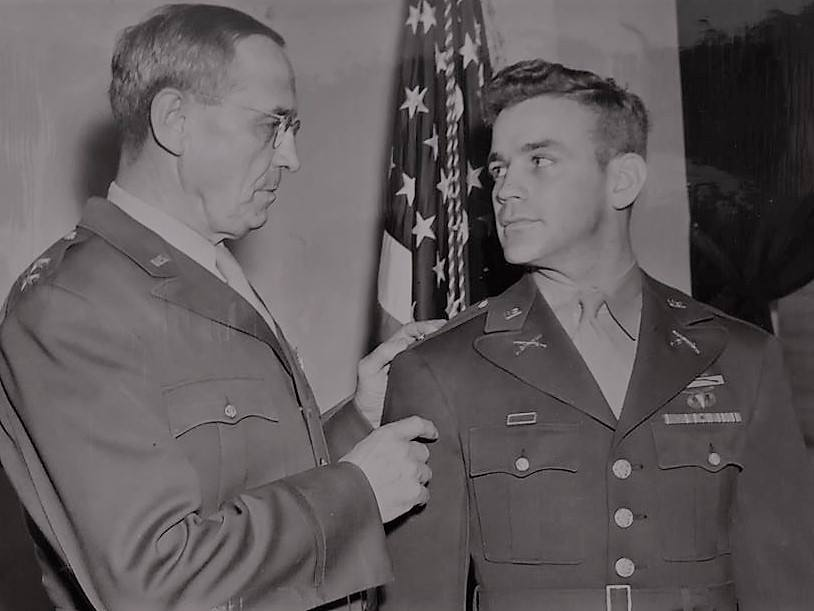
Thompson pins rank insignia on First Sergeant Hubert Odom's uniform following Odom's promotion to second lieutenant in October 1944

From July 1940 to July 1941, Thompson commanded the 3rd Infantry Division. He was promoted to major general in October 1940, and led the division during its organization and training prior to entering combat for World War II. During his division command, Thompson selected Dwight D. Eisenhower to serve as chief of staff, and Eisenhower's success in the assignment was later viewed as one factor that caused senior leaders to identify him as a likely candidate for wartime positions of more rank and responsibility.

From July 1941 to June 1942, Thompson commanded I Corps in Columbia, South Carolina. From June to October 1942, he commanded the Infantry Replacement Center at Camp Croft, South Carolina. In October 1942, Thompson was succeeded at Camp Croft by Reginald W. Buzzell, who had been his deputy, and appointed to command the II Islands Command, which was responsible for the defenses of Tonga and Fiji. In addition, Thompson's command was responsible for handling the administrative, logistical, and training requirements of arriving U.S. military units, ensuring they were prepared to enter combat in the Pacific theater.

Thompson served in the Operations section (G-3) on the Army staff in May and June 1944. He was then assigned as deputy commander of Second Army, based in Memphis, Tennessee. From September 1944 to July 1945, Thompson commanded the Military District of Washington. Thompson commanded the Patient Detachment at Walter Reed General Hospital from July to November 1945. He retired from the military on November 30, 1945.

== Awards ==
In addition to the Army Distinguished Service Medal and Chevalier of the Legion of Honor for World War I, Thompson's awards and decorations included two more awards of the Distinguished Service Medal for his World War II service. In addition, he received:

- Mexican Service Medal
- World War I Victory Medal
- American Defense Service Medal
- American Campaign Medal
- Asiatic–Pacific Campaign Medal
- World War II Victory Medal
- Companion of the Order of the Bath (Great Britain)

== Retirement and death ==
In retirement, Thompson and his wife resided at the Kennedy–Warren Apartment Building in Washington, D.C. The Thompsons were contract bridge players, as were the Eisenhowers, and the two couples often played together. Thompson died in Washington on June 15, 1954. He was buried at Arlington National Cemetery, and the Eisenhowers were among the attendees at his funeral.

== Family ==
In 1909, Thompson married Laura Bell Jenks (1887–1955). They were the parents of two daughters, Marjorie, the wife of Howard E. Engler of San Antonio, Texas and Barbara, the wife of J. Maury Dove Jr. of Annapolis, Maryland.

== Legacy ==
Thompson Circle, a street on the Fort Eustis portion of Joint Base Langley–Eustis, was named for Thompson.

Military offices
Preceded by Walter C. Short	Commanding General I Corps; 1941–1942	Succeeded by Robert L. Eichelberger
