= Jody J. Daniels =

U.S. Army Lieutenant General

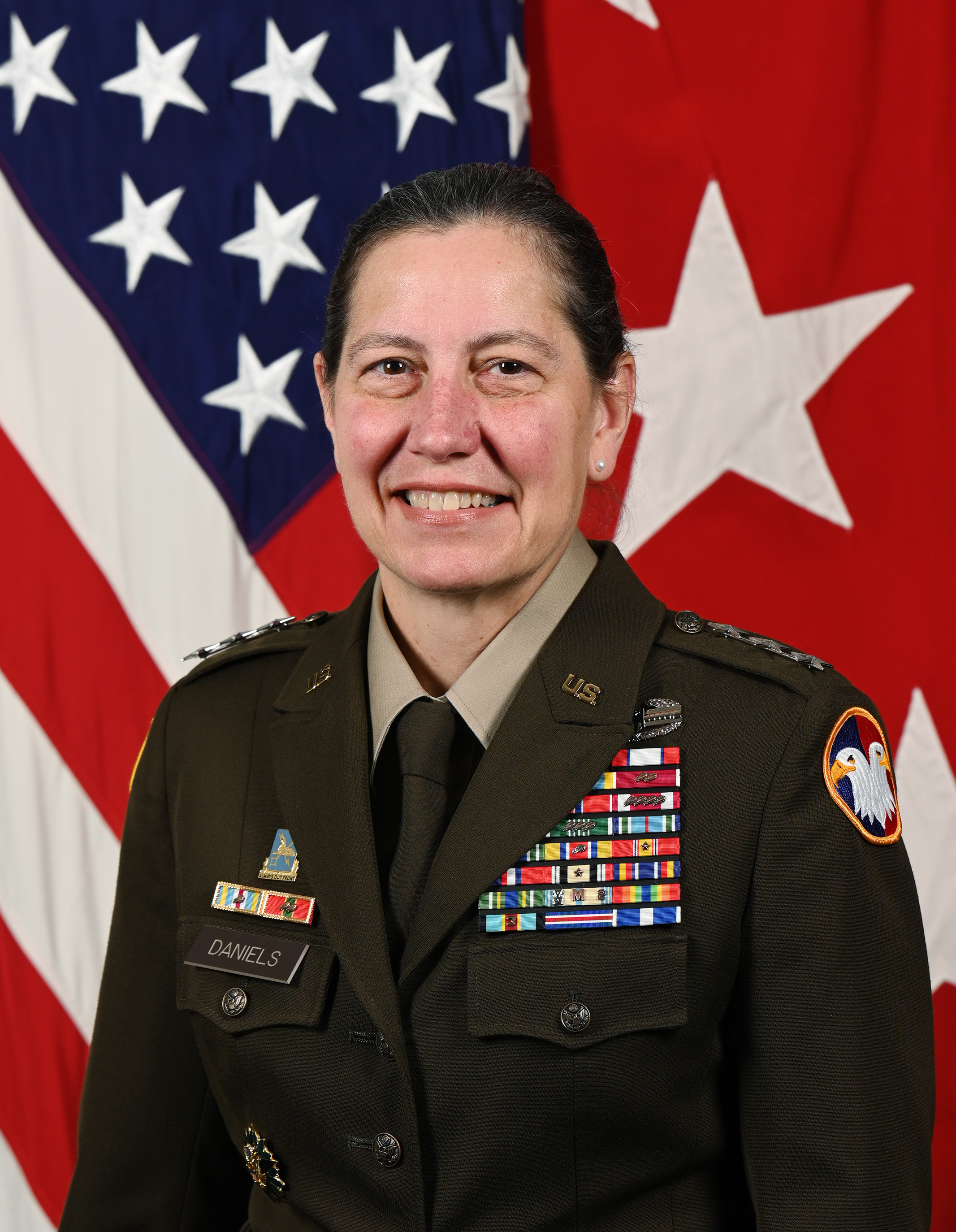
- Official portrait, 2022
- Born: 1961 or 1962 (age 64–65); Rolla, Missouri, U.S.
- Education: Carnegie Mellon University (BS); University of Massachusetts Amherst (MS, PhD); United States Army War College
- Military career
- Allegiance: United States
- Branch: United States Army
- Service years: 1983–2024
- Rank: Lieutenant General
- Commands: United States Army Reserve Command; 88th Readiness Division; 87th United States Army Reserve Support Command (East)
- Conflicts: Iraq War
- Awards: Army Distinguished Service Medal; Defense Superior Service Medal; Legion of Merit (3); Bronze Star Medal
- Other work: Director of Advanced Programs for Lockheed Martin's Advanced Technology Laboratories

Jody J. Daniels (born 1961 or 1962 (age 64–65)) is a retired United States Army lieutenant general who served as the 34th Chief of the United States Army Reserve, and the 9th Commanding General, United States Army Reserve Command. She earned her commission through Reserve Officers Training Corps in 1983. In July 2020, Daniels was confirmed to succeed Lieutenant General Charles D. Luckey as Chief of Army Reserve.

== Early life and education ==
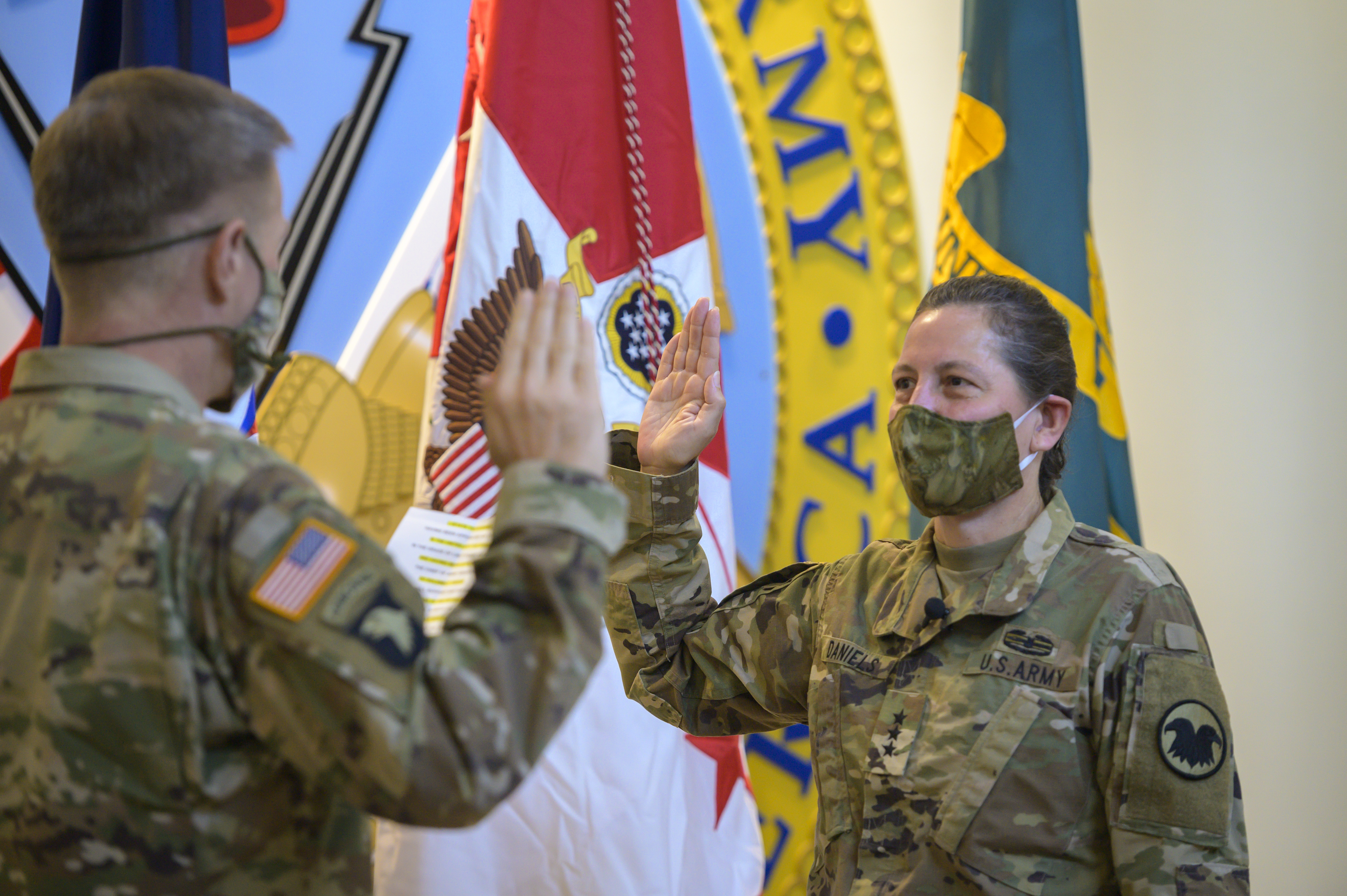
Lt. Gen. Jody J. Daniels (right), the new commanding general and Chief of U.S. Army Reserve, recites the oath of office administered by Gen. James C. McConville, chief of staff of the Army, during her promotion, oath of office, and assumption of command ceremony at Fort Bragg, North Carolina, July 28, 2020.

Born in Rolla, Missouri, Daniels earned Bachelor of Science in Applied Mathematics (Computer Science) from Carnegie Mellon University in 1983, and later earned Master of Science and also Doctor of Philosophy in computer science at University of Massachusetts Amherst. Her dissertation, in computer science, is titled Retrieval of passages for information reduction. She also graduated from the United States Army War College with a master's degree in strategic studies.

Jody later received an honorary doctorate from University of Massachusetts Amherst in 2019 and an honorary Doctor of Science and Technology from Carnegie Mellon University in 2022.

== Career ==
In Daniels' civilian career, she was the Director of Advanced Programs for Lockheed Martin's Advanced Technology Laboratories.

== Awards and decorations ==
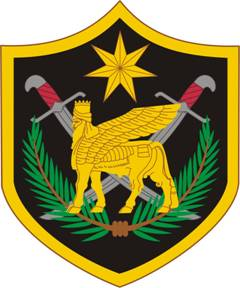
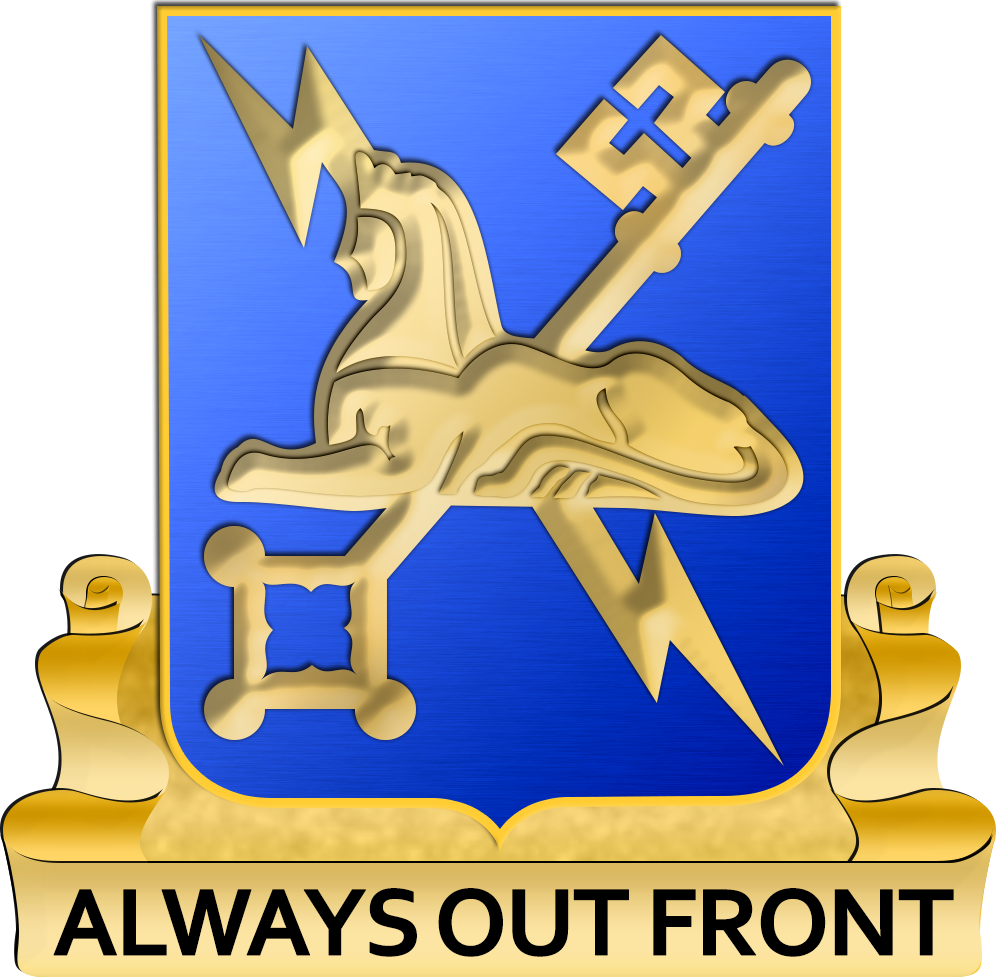
Combat Action Badge
MNF-I Combat Service Identification Badge
Army Staff Identification Badge
Army Military Intelligence Corps Distinctive Unit Insignia

Army Distinguished Service Medal
Defense Superior Service Medal
Legion of Merit with two bronze oak leaf clusters
Bronze Star Medal
Meritorious Service Medal with four oak leaf clusters
Joint Service Commendation Medal
Army Commendation Medal with three oak leaf clusters
Joint Service Achievement Medal
Army Achievement Medal with oak leaf cluster
Joint Meritorious Unit Award with oak leaf cluster
Superior Unit Award with two oak leaf clusters
Army Reserve Component Achievement Medal with silver oak leaf cluster
National Defense Service Medal with one bronze service star
Kosovo Campaign Medal
Iraq Campaign Medal with service star
Global War on Terrorism Service Medal
Korea Defense Service Medal
Armed Forces Reserve Medal with silver Hourglass device, "M" device and bronze award numeral 2
Army Service Ribbon
Army Overseas Service Ribbon with award numeral 3
Reserve Overseas Service Ribbon
NATO Medal for Kosovo

Military offices
Preceded by Charles D. Luckey	Chief of the United States Army Reserve and Commanding General of the United States Army Reserve Command; 2020–2024	Succeeded by Robert Harter
