= Baratz =

Baratz is a surname. Notable people with the surname include:

- Abraham Baratz (1895–1975), Romanian–French chess master
- Max Baratz (born 1934), American army general
- Robert Baratz, American dentist and skeptic
- Yosef Baratz (1890–1968), Israeli activist and politician
