= General Barker =

General Barker may refer to:

== British Army ==
- Sir Robert Barker, 1st Baronet (1732–1789), British Army brigadier general
- George Robert Barker (1817–1861), British Army brigadier general
- George Digby Barker (1833–1914), British Army general
- Michael Barker (British Army officer) (1884–1960), British Army lieutenant general
- Evelyn Barker (1894–1983), British Army general

== South African Air Force ==
- Desmond Barker (1949–2021), South African Air Force major general

== U.S. Army ==
- John William Barker (1872–1924), U.S. Army brigadier general
- Ray Barker (1889–1974), U.S. Army major general
- Vincent B. Barker (fl. 1980s–2020s), U.S. Army major general
