= Charles D. Luckey =

U.S. Army Lieutenant General (born 1955)

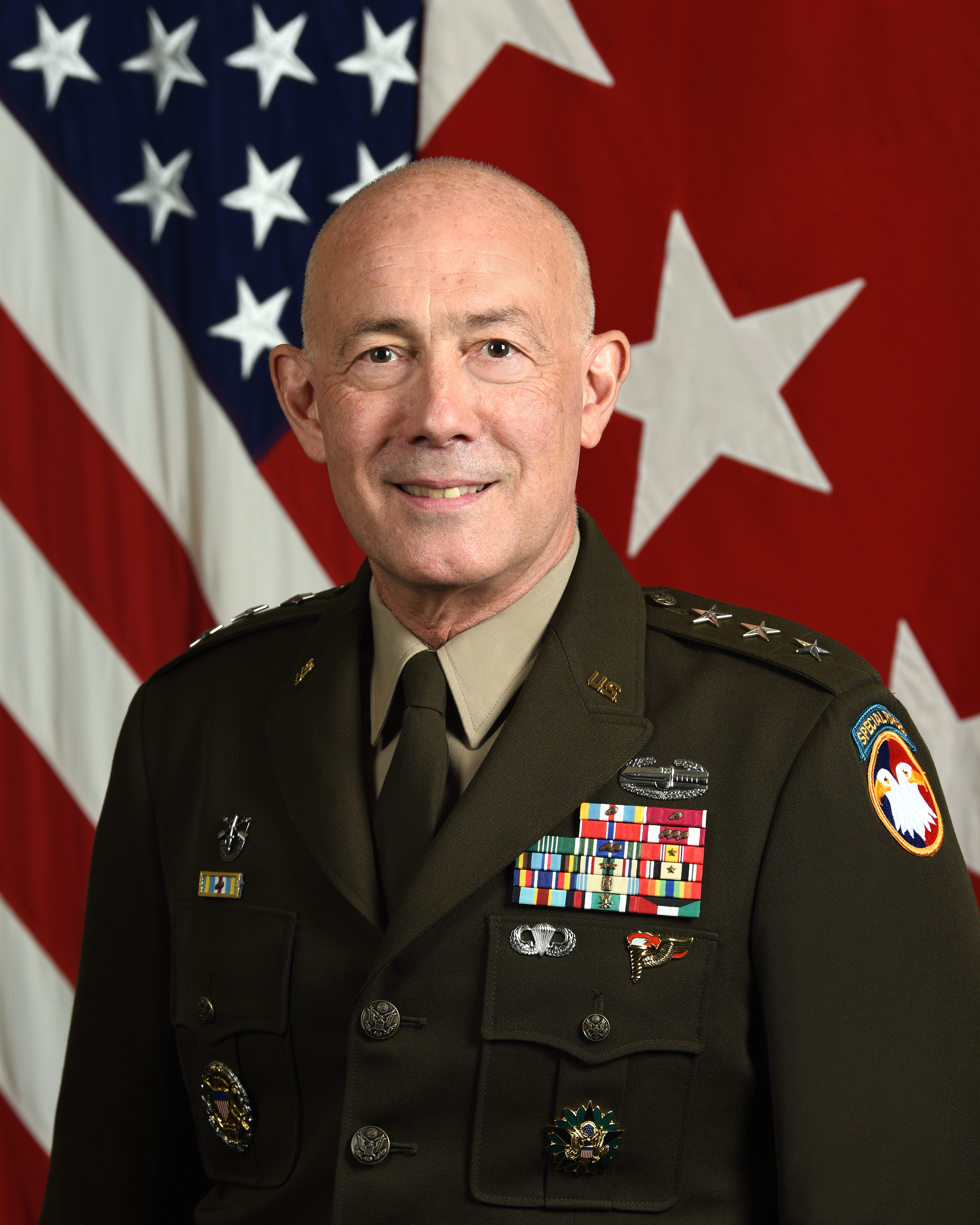
- Official portrait, 2019
- Born: 1955 (age 70–71)
- Education: University of Virginia (BA); University of Connecticut School of Law (JD); United States Army War College (MSS); Phillips Exeter Academy
- Military career
- Allegiance: United States
- Branch: United States Army
- Service years: 1977–2020
- Rank: Lieutenant General
- Nicknames: "Chief", "Chipster", "Chas", "Chip"
- Commands: United States Army Reserve Command; 78th Infantry Division; 81st Regional Readiness Group
- Conflicts: Operation Just Cause; Gulf War; Iraq War
- Awards: Army Distinguished Service Medal; Defense Superior Service Medal (2); Legion of Merit (2); Bronze Star Medal

Charles Dana Luckey (born 1955) is a retired Lieutenant General in the United States Army who, at age 65, retired from the Army as its oldest Green Beret in uniform after serving as the Commanding General of the United States Army Reserve Command (since 2016). He is a graduate of the University of Virginia, the University of Connecticut School of Law, the United States Army War College, and the Phillips Exeter Academy. He succeeded Lieutenant General Jeff Talley in Command and, in July 2020, Jody J. Daniels was confirmed to succeed Luckey as Chief of Army Reserve.

== Military career ==
Luckey was commissioned as an Infantry Officer in the Regular Army after graduating as a Distinguished Military Graduate from the University of Virginia in 1977. Luckey began his military career leading Soldiers in both mechanized and Special Forces units until separating from active duty in 1982 to attend law school. Graduating with a Juris Doctor from the University of Connecticut School of Law in 1985, Luckey returned to active duty and served with the 82d Airborne, Ft. Bragg, NC in multiple roles as Chief, Operational Law; Senior Trial Counsel; Chief, Criminal Law, and Deputy Staff Judge Advocate (Forward) during Operation Desert Shield/Desert Storm. In 1991, Luckey transferred to the Army Reserve and subsequently commanded units at the battalion, brigade, and group level, culminating with his assignment as the Commanding General of the 78th Division (TS) before returning to Active Duty in 2008.

Recalled to active duty in 2008 to serve as the Chief, Office of Security Cooperation in Baghdad, Iraq, Luckey took a military leave of absence from his Law Firm in North Carolina to serve in Operation Iraqi Freedom where he led a team of Americans to provide capabilities to the senior leadership of Iraq. Upon returning from Baghdad, Luckey was selected to serve as the Assistant to the Chairman of the Joint Chiefs of Staff and, subsequently, as Chief of Staff, North American Aerospace Defense Command and Northern Command. He was subsequently selected to serve as the Chief, Army Reserve in Washington DC, and the Commanding General of United States Army Reserve Command at FT Bragg, North Carolina.

Luckey assumed duty as the Chief of Army Reserve and Commanding General, United States Army Reserve Command on 30 June 2016 and relinquished command on 2 July 2020. In July 2020, Jody J. Daniels was confirmed to succeed Luckey as Chief of Army Reserve.

== Legal Background ==
Since retiring from the Army, Luckey has remained affiliated with the law firm of Blanco Tackabery & Matamoros P.A. in Winston-Salem where he practiced as a litigation partner for several decades before his recall to active duty. Luckey, a former Army Judge Advocate, is an experienced trial lawyer who has tried a wide variety of both criminal and civil cases in a number of venues and jurisdictions. He is admitted to practice law in several states (North Carolina, Connecticut and Wisconsin) and federal judicial districts, to include the US Court of Appeals for the 4th Circuit, and the Supreme Court of the United States. He remains an active member of the North Carolina State Bar.

== Personal ==
As a graduate of Phillips Exeter Academy, Luckey has often commented that his time at Exeter was the most intellectually formative of his life and the place where he gained appreciation for the importance of sustainable resilience, the ability to agreeably disagree, and the power of strategic empathy. Luckey is married to the former Julie Marie Fisher of Greensboro, North Carolina, and has three children and three granddaughters. He currently resides in North Carolina and remains aggressively engaged in a wide variety of activities and operations. He writes and posts regularly on matters regarding his profound concern with America's challenges to include: our current political dysfunction, our eroding confidence in our ability to govern ourselves or to embrace the common good, and our weakening of commitment to the rule of law. He has often characterized our time as "The Age of Epistemic Warfare" and regularly publishes a column in The Pilot, an independently owned and operated newspaper in Moore County, North Carolina. He is a full-time student at Wake Forest University's School of Divinity where he is in pursuit of a Masters of Divinity degree.

In the 2024 United States presidential election, Luckey endorsed Kamala Harris.

Military offices
| Preceded by Jeffrey W. Talley | Commanding General; United States Army Reserve; 2016–2020 | Succeeded by Jody J. Daniels |
