= United States Department of the Army =

Military department in the Department of Defense

- Emblem of the Department of the Army

Agency overview
- Formed: July 14, 1775; 251 years ago
- Preceding agency: Department of War
- Headquarters: The Pentagon, Arlington County, Virginia, U.S.
- Annual budget: $174.7B (FY2022)
- Secretary responsible: Adam Telle (acting)
- Under Secretary responsible: Mike Obadal
- Parent department: United States Department of Defense
- Child agency: United States Army
- Website: army.mil

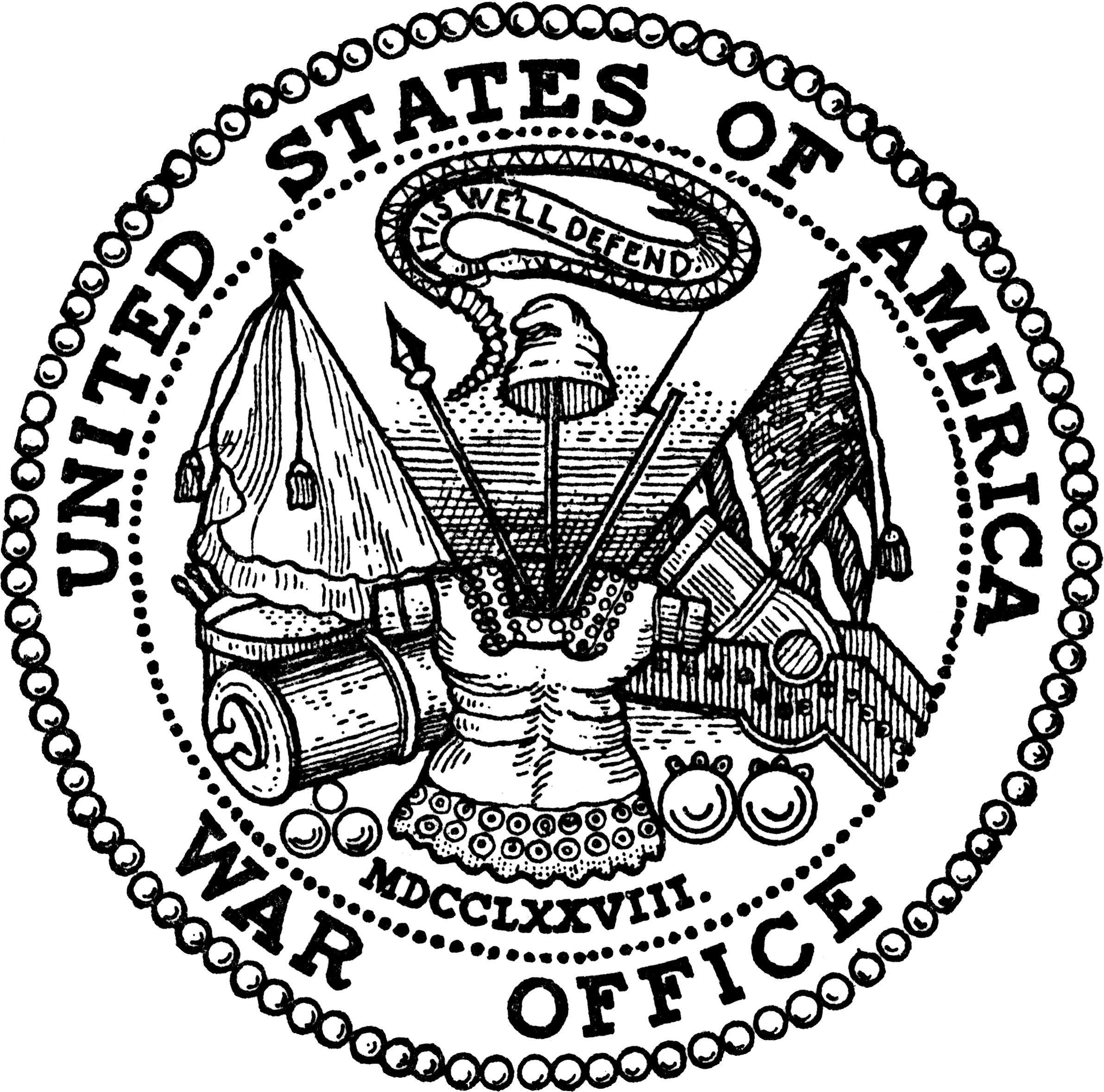
Seal of the Department of War (1789–1947)

The Department of the Army (DA) is one of the three military departments within the United States Department of Defense. The DA is the federal government agency within which the United States Army is organized. It is led by the secretary of the Army, a civilian official appointed by the president and confirmed by the Senate. The highest-ranking military officer in the department is the chief of staff of the Army, who is also a member of the Joint Chiefs of Staff. Other senior officials of the department are the under secretary of the Army (principal deputy to the secretary) and the vice chief of staff of the Army (principal deputy to the chief of staff.)

The DA is a successor to the Department of War which was originally formed in 1789 as an Executive Department of the United States. The Department of War was split by the National Security Act of 1947 into the Department of the Army and Department of the Air Force on September 18, 1947.

== Organizational structure ==
The Department of the Army is a military department within the United States Department of Defense. The department is headed by the secretary of the army, who by statute must be a civilian, appointed by the president with the confirmation by the United States Senate. The secretary of the Army is responsible for and has the authority to conduct all the affairs of the Department of the Army, subject to the authority, direction and control of the secretary of defense. The Department of the Army is divided between its headquarters at the seat of government and the field organizations of the Army.

By direction of the secretary of defense, the secretary of the Army assigns Army forces, apart from those units performing duties enumerated in 10 United States Code § 7013 (i.e., organize, train & equip) or unless otherwise directed to the operational command of the commanders of the Combatant Commands. Only the secretary of defense (and the president) has the authority to approve transfer of forces to and from Combatant Commands by 10 United States Code § 162.

=== Headquarters, Department of the Army ===
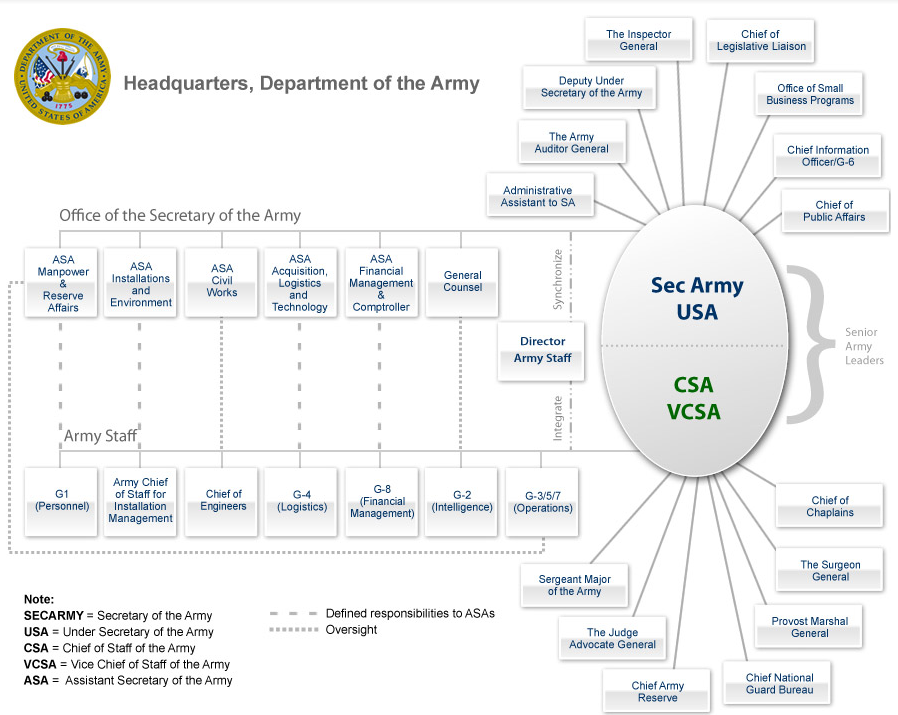
Chart summarizing the organization of the Department of the Army's Headquarters as of 2010.

Headquarters, Department of the Army is the corporate office of the department which exercises directive and supervisory functions and consists of two separate staffs: the Office of the Secretary of the Army (10 United States Code § 7014), the mainly civilian staff; and the Army Staff (10 United States Code § 7031, & 10 United States Code § 7032), the mainly military staff. The Office of the Secretary and the Army Staff are organized along similar lines, with civilians and military officers both overseeing similar program areas. (Note: Understanding the Army Requirements Oversight Council (AROC) See Joint Requirements Oversight Council)

Civilian (Army Secretariat)	Military (Army Staff)
Assistant Secretary of the Army (Manpower and Reserve Affairs)	Deputy Chief of Staff (G1-Personnel); Deputy Chief of Staff (G3/5/7-Operations, Plans, and Training)
Assistant Secretary of the Army for Installations, Energy and Environment	Deputy Chief of Staff (G1-Personnel); Deputy Chief of Staff (G4-Logistics)
Assistant Secretary of the Army for Civil Works	Chief of Engineers
Assistant Secretary of the Army for Acquisition, Logistics, and Technology	Deputy Chief of Staff (G4-Logistics)
Assistant Secretary of the Army (Financial Management and Comptroller)	Deputy Chief of Staff (G8-Financial Management)
General Counsel of the Army	Deputy Chief of Staff (G2-Intelligence)
Army Chief Information Officer (CIO)	Deputy Chief of Staff (G6-Communications/IT)

==== Office of the Secretary ====
The Office of the Secretary is led by the secretary of the Army, assisted by the under secretary of the Army and the administrative assistant to the secretary of the Army, who is the senior civilian career official of the department. The Office of the Secretary of the Army, also known as the Army Secretariat, is divided into multiple branches with functional responsibilities, the six most important of which are headed by one of the five assistant secretaries of the Army or the general counsel of the Army, each of whom are civilians appointed by the president and confirmed by the Senate.

==== The Army Staff ====
The Army Staff Identification Badge

The Army Staff is led by the chief of staff of the Army, a four-star general who is the highest-ranking officer in the Army and the Army member of the Joint Chiefs of Staff. The chief of staff is assisted in managing the Army Staff by the vice chief of staff of the United States Army, a four-star general and second highest-ranking officer in the Army. The Army Staff is divided into several directorates, each headed by a three-star general; a deputy chief of staff (DCS G–1 (personnel), G–2 (intelligence), G–3 (operations), G–4 (logistics), G-5 (planning), G-6 (network), G-7 (training), and G-8 (finance) respectively). The DCS G-3/5/7 is a single office for operations, plans, and training.

A key official within the Army Staff is the director of the Army Staff, who is a three-star general. The director is responsible for integrating and synchronizing the work of the Office of the Secretary and the Army Staff so that they meet the goals and priorities of the secretary of the Army. Other key figures within the Army Staff are the sergeant major of the Army, the Army Staff Senior Warrant Officer, the Chief Warrant Officer of the Army, the United States Army judge advocate general, the chief of the Army Reserve, the United States Army provost marshal general, and the United States Army surgeon general. The chief of the National Guard Bureau was previously considered part of the Army Staff, but has been elevated to four-star rank and membership in the Joint Chiefs of Staff; the director of the Army National Guard and the director of the Air National Guard (both three-star positions) report to the chief, National Guard Bureau for strategy and policy, but receive funding and Service-specific guidance from their respective services, as they have different legal authorities.

=== Army commands and army service component commands ===
Headquarters, United States Department of the Army (HQDA):

Army Commands	Current commander	Location of headquarters
United States Army Transformation and Training Command (T2COM)	GEN David M. Hodne	Austin, Texas
United States Army Materiel Command (AMC)	LTG Christopher O. Mohan	Redstone Arsenal, Alabama
Army Service Component Commands	Current commander	Location of headquarters
United States Army Western Hemisphere Command (USAWHC)	GEN Joseph A. Ryan	Fort Bragg, North Carolina
United States Army Europe and Africa(USAREUR-AF)/Seventh Army	GEN Christopher T. Donahue	Clay Kaserne, Wiesbaden, Germany
United States Army Pacific (USARPAC)	GEN Ronald P. Clark	Fort Shafter, Hawaii
United States Army Central (ARCENT)/Third Army	LTG Kevin C. Leahy	Shaw Air Force Base, South Carolina
United States Army Cyber Command (ARCYBER)	LTG Maria B. Barrett	Fort Gordon, Georgia
United States Army Space and Missile Defense Command/United States Army Forces Strategic Command (USASMDC/ARSTRAT)	LTG Sean Gainey	Redstone Arsenal, Alabama
United States Army Special Operations Command (USASOC)	LTG Lawrence G. Ferguson	Fort Bragg, North Carolina
United States Army Transportation Command (ARTRANS)	MG Lance G. Curtis	Scott AFB, Illinois
Operational Force Headquarters	Current commander	Location of headquarters
Eighth Army (EUSA)	LTG Joseph E. Hilbert	Camp Humphreys, South Korea
Direct reporting units	Current commander	Location of headquarters
Arlington National Cemetery and Soldiers' and Airmen's Home National Cemetery	Katharine Kelley (civilian)	Arlington County, Virginia
Joint Counter-Small Unmanned Aircraft Systems Office	MG David F. Stewart	Arlington County, Virginia
Military Postal Service Agency	BG Gregory S. Johnson	Arlington County, Virginia
United States Army Acquisition Support Center (USAASC)	Craig A. Spisak (civilian)	Fort Belvoir, Virginia
United States Army Audit Agency (USAAA)	Bruce B. Miller	Alexandria, Virginia
United States Army Civilian Human Resources Agency (CHRA)	Carol Burton (civilian)	Aberdeen Proving Ground, Maryland
United States Army Corps of Engineers (USACE)	LTG William H. Graham Jr.	Washington, D.C.
United States Army Corrections Command (ACC)	BG Sarah K. Albrycht	Arlington County, Virginia
United States Army Criminal Investigation Division (USACID)	Gregory D. Ford	Quantico, Virginia
United States Army Human Resources Command (HRC)	MG Hope C. Rampy	Fort Knox, Kentucky
United States Army Intelligence and Security Command (INSCOM)	MG Timothy D. Brown	Fort Belvoir, Virginia
United States Army Medical Command (MEDCOM)	LTG Mary K. Izaguirre	Joint Base San Antonio, Texas
U.S. Army Reserve Command (USARC)	LTG Robert Harter	Fort Bragg, North Carolina
United States Army Military District of Washington (MDW)	MG Antoinette R. Gant	Fort Lesley J. McNair, Washington, D.C.
United States Military Academy (USMA)	LTG Steven W. Gilland	West Point, New York

== See also ==
- Department of the Air Force
- Department of the Navy
- National Guard Bureau
- Office of the Secretary of Defense
- Office of the Chief Legislative Liaison (United States Army)
- Title 32 of the Code of Federal Regulations

== Bibliography ==
- Army General Order NO. 2020-01: ASSIGNMENT OF FUNCTIONS AND RESPONSIBILITIES WITHIN HEADQUARTERS, DEPARTMENT OF THE ARMY, Accessed on 2021-01-22.
- Army Regulation 10–87, Army Commands, Army Service Component Commands, and Direct Reporting Units, Accessed on 2021-01-22.
