= Vincent B. Barker =

U.S. Army general

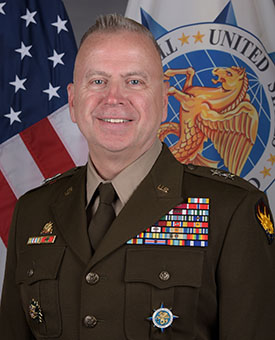
- Military career
- Allegiance: United States
- Branch: United States Marine Corps (USMC); United States Army (USA)
- Service years: 1981–1984 (USMC); 1987–2023 (USA)
- Rank: Major General
- Nickname: Boyd
- Commands: 310th Sustainment Command (Expeditionary); Army Sustainment Command – Army Reserve Element; 757th Transportation Battalion (Railway)
- Conflicts: Iraq War; War in Afghanistan; Operation Inherent Resolve
- Awards: Defense Superior Service Medal; Legion of Merit (2); Bronze Star Medal

Vincent B. Barker is a retired United States Army major general who last served as the Chief of Staff of the United States Transportation Command. Previously, he served as the Deputy Inspector General of the United States Army.

Military offices
Preceded by Michael Dillard	Commander of the 310th Sustainment Command (Expeditionary); 2015–2018	Succeeded by ???
Preceded by Steven T. Eveker	Deputy Commander of the 377th Theater Sustainment Command; 2018–2019	Succeeded by Bowlman T. Bowles III
Preceded by Susan E. Henderson	Director of Sustainment of Combined Joint Task Force – Operation Inherent Resolve; 2019–2020	Succeeded by ???
Preceded by ???	GOMO Support of the Office of the Chief of Army Reserve; 2020	Succeeded by Miyako N. Schanely
Preceded by Donald E. Jackson	Deputy Inspector General of the United States Army; 2020–2021	Succeeded by Isaac Manigault; Acting
Preceded by Deborah Kotulich	Chief of Staff of the United States Transportation Command; 2021–2023	Succeeded by Susan E. Henderson
