= William F. Ward Jr. =

United States Army general

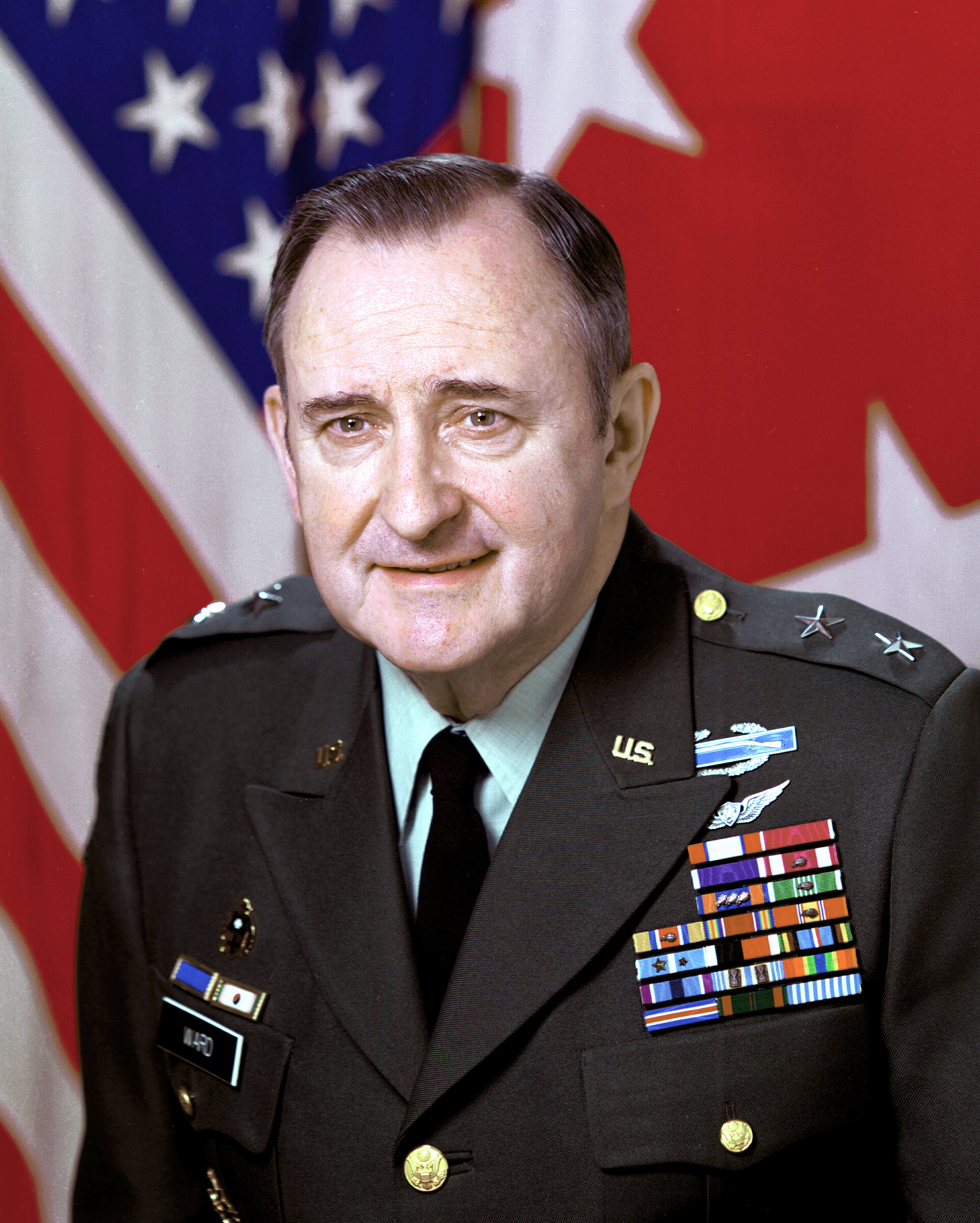
- Born: August 23, 1928; Everett, Massachusetts, U.S.
- Died: June 21, 2018 (aged 89); Florida, United States
- Military career
- Allegiance: United States
- Branch: United States Army
- Rank: Major general
- Commands: United States Army Reserve

William Francis Ward Jr. (August 23, 1928 – June 21, 2018) was a major general in the United States Army. He was chief of the United States Army Reserve from December 1, 1986, to July 31, 1991.
