= United States Army Reserve Command =

US Army command responsible for all Army Reserve units

- USARC shoulder sleeve insignia
- Active: 23 April 1908; 118 years ago–present
- Country: United States
- Branch: United States Army; Army Reserve
- Size: 205,000
- Part of: Department of the Army
- Garrison/HQ: Fort Bragg, North Carolina, US
- Motto: "Twice the Citizen"
- Anniversaries: 23 April

Commanders
- Commanding General and Chief of Army Reserve: LTG Robert Harter
- Deputy Commanding General: MG Martin F. Klein
- Command Chief Warrant Officer, U.S. Army Reserve Command: CW5 LaShon P. White
- Command Sergeant Major of the Army Reserve: CSM Gregory Betty

Insignia
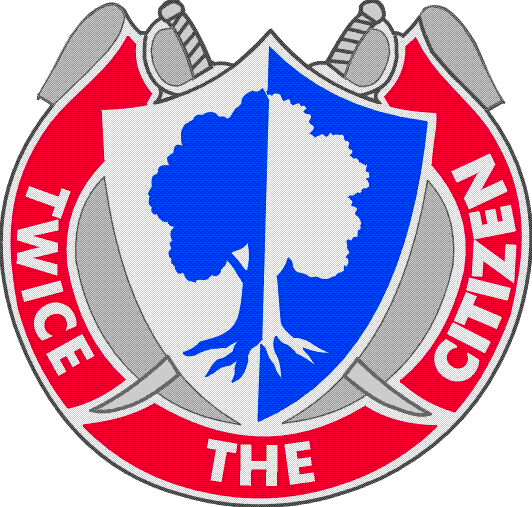
- Distinctive unit insignia

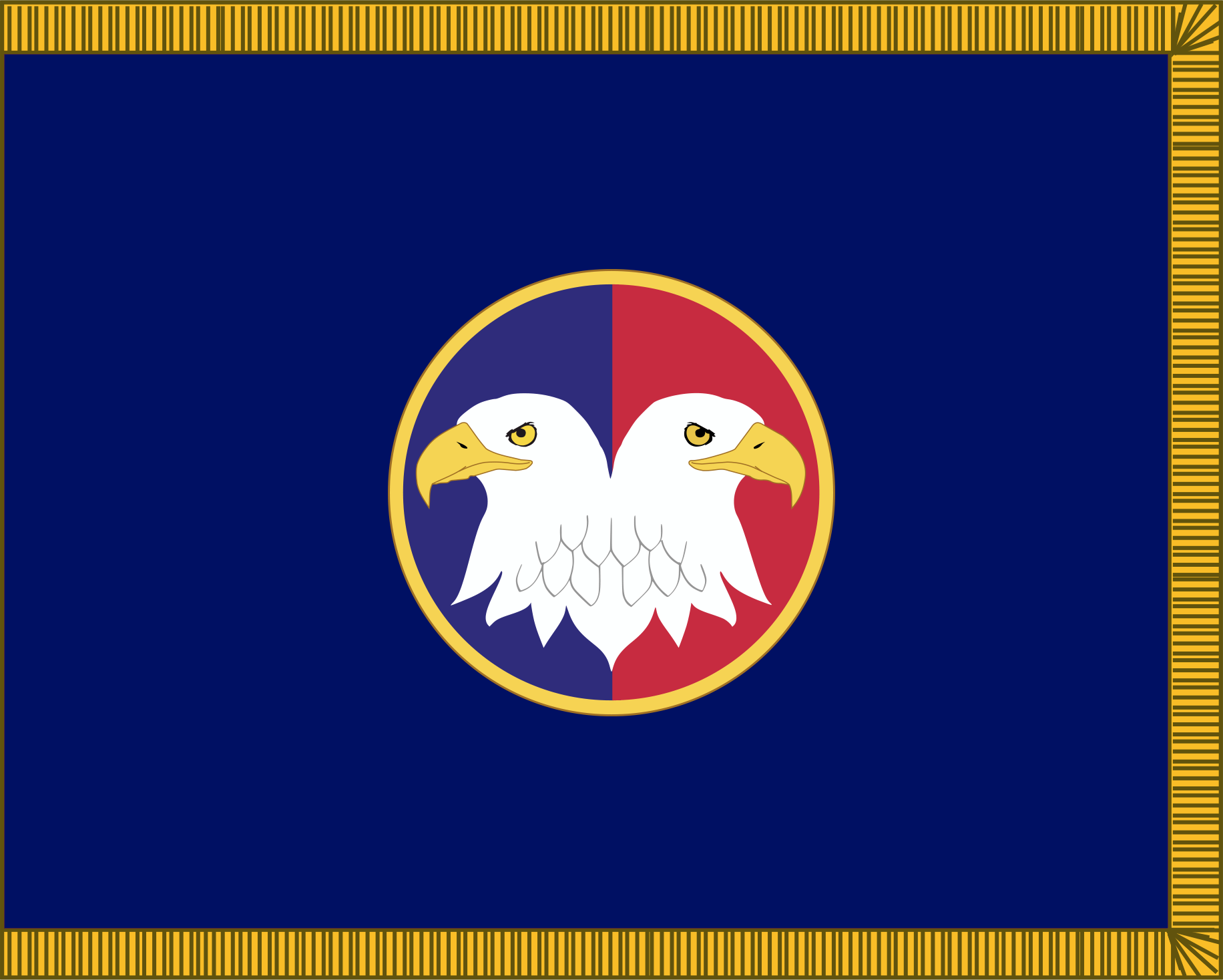
- US Army Reserve Command Flag

The United States Army Reserve Command (USARC) commands all United States Army Reserve units, and is responsible for overseeing unit staffing, training, management, and deployment. Approximately 205,000 Army Reserve soldiers are assigned to USARC. The major subordinate commands that report directly to USARC consist of operational commands, functional commands, support commands, and training commands. In turn, USARC itself reports to the Office of the Chief of Army Reserve within the Headquarters, Department of the Army. USARC is headquartered at Fort Bragg in North Carolina.

== Mission ==
The U.S. Army Reserve Command (USARC)'s mission is to provide trained and ready units (and individuals) to mobilize and deploy in support of the national military strategy. USARC is responsible for all of the operational tasks involved in training, equipping, managing, supporting, mobilizing, and retaining soldiers under its command. USARC has over 20 offices, each with an individual mission and function that contributes to the accomplishment of USARC's overall mission.

- Operational groups such as personnel, logistics, operations, training, and resource management are responsible for the daily work involved in managing, training, and equipping the Army Reserve's soldiers and units across the continental United States.
- Special staff offices provide technical support and guidelines to USARC and Army Reserve units across the country. These offices include public affairs, safety, and enterprise services.
- The executive staff includes the leaders of USARC and their personal staff. The leaders are the commanding general, the deputy commanding general, the chief of staff, and the command sergeant major. The personal staff includes the staff judge advocate (legal), inspector general, historian, and chaplain.

== History ==
=== Establishment of the Chief, Army Reserve ===
As the evolutionary process continued, there were more congressional hearings and investigations and major reorganizations of the Army. This included Secretary of Defense Robert S. McNamara's failed attempt between 1965 and 1966 to merge units of the Army Reserve into the National Guard. In 1967, Congress passed watershed legislation in the form of the Reserve Forces Bill of Rights and Vitalization Act. In essence, the act, among other features, prescribed reserve leadership for reserve units. For the Army, the act created a statutory Chief, Army Reserve (CAR) who served as an advisor to the Army Chief of Staff on Army Reserve matters. Command and control of the Army Reserve, however, was under the Continental Army Command (CONARC) until 1973, and after that, under the Forces Command (FORSCOM). The act also virtually eliminated bitter congressional deliberation over reserve component policy—for a while.

=== Congress-directed design of a command and control plan ===
In 1988, the House Committee on Appropriations Surveys and Investigation rekindled the debate. The committee uncovered two command and control reporting chains for the Army Reserve: FORSCOM and the CAR. Unlike the Air Force Reserve and the Navy Reserve, the CAR did not have sole command of the Army Reserve. In 1989, Congress directed the Army to design a command and control plan for the Army Reserve. Congress and the Army, with FORSCOM in the lead, began the struggle, at times difficult, to produce a mutually agreeable arrangement for the Army Reserve.

FORSCOM, the Office of the Chief Army Reserve (OCAR), the Department of the Army, and Congress each had its own plan. Command and control options spanned from the creation of an independent major command to a major subordinate command under FORSCOM.

=== Major subordinate command status ===
On 18 January 1990, the CAR and the FORSCOM commander reached an agreement, a major step in the evolution of the new command. The Army's plan called for the command to be organized as a major subordinate command. FORSCOM was to develop overall policy for units of the U.S. Army Reserve (USAR), while the Reserve Command was to prepare implementation procedures, plans, and programs in accordance with FORSCOM guidance. Integration of the active component and reserve component into a total force was the ultimate objective.

=== U.S. Army Reserve Command Planning Group ===
As the plans were staffed and reviewed, FORSCOM pushed forward in March 1990 by creating the U.S. Army Reserve Command (USARC) Planning Group, charged with providing the functional nucleus to plan and develop the details for establishing the USARC (e.g., table of distribution and allowance, organization and functions manual, etc.). The USARC Planning Group was to evolve into the heart of the new USARC headquarters. Meanwhile, Congress and the Army had differing views on the next course of action. In the midst of this came another negotiated agreement between the OCAR and FORSCOM, the management of USAR funds.

=== U.S. Army Reserve Command (Provisional) ===
Permanent Order 183-13, dated 1 October 1990, established the U.S. Army Reserve Command (Provisional). Congress legally formalized this arrangement in November 1990 with passage of the National Defense Authorization Act for Fiscal Year 1991. The act assigned to the command all Army Reserve forces in the continental United States, save those assigned to Special Operations Forces and those forces as directed by the Secretary of Defense. The act set a test period of two years for operation of the command and required the Secretary of the Army during the test period to submit semiannual reports on the command to the Committee on Armed Services of both congressional houses. The act directed the Secretary of the Army to establish an independent commission assisting the Secretary of the Army in evaluating the progress and effectiveness of the command. Twenty-three years after passage of the Reserve Forces Bill of Rights and Vitalization Act, the CAR was in statutory command of the Army Reserve.

=== Evolution to a fully operational command ===
There was much to be done in a year, the time schedule for evolution of the USARC into a fully operational command. Congress directed the development of a concept plan for the new command. FORSCOM and the USARC Planning Group worked for months on resolving differences, for example, in the organization and functions manual. Other actions ranged from developing a plan to transition functions from the Continental U.S. Armies and FORSCOM to the USARC to finding a home for the USARC and hiring personnel. Evolution into a fully operational command came on 18 October 1991 with Permanent Order 54-15.

In the spring of 1990, building 906 at Fort Gillem served as the temporary headquarters for the planning group from which the USARC evolved. The USARC occupied two other temporary sites, including a leased facility at Camp Creek Business Center, Camp Creek Parkway, Atlanta, until the fall of 1997, when the USARC relocated to its permanent home on Fort McPherson. In 2011, the USARC headquarters moved to Fort Bragg, North Carolina.

=== Transfer to Headquarters, Department of the Army ===
On 5 December 2025, the United States Army Reserve Command, along with its mission and resources, transferred from FORSCOM to Headquarters, Department of the Army, as a direct reporting unit to the Office of the Chief of Army Reserve.

== Subordinate units ==
=== Geographic Commands ===
- 1st Mission Support Command, at Fort Buchanan (Puerto Rico)
- 7th Mission Support Command, in Kaiserslautern (Germany) subordinate to 21st Theater Sustainment Command
- 9th Mission Support Command, at Fort Shafter (HI) — under operational control of US Army Pacific and providing support in Hawaii, Alaska, American Samoa, Japan, South Korea, Guam, and Saipan.
- 63rd Readiness Division, in Mountain View (CA) — providing support in California, Nevada, New Mexico, Arizona, Texas, Oklahoma, and Arkansas
- 81st Readiness Division, at Fort Jackson (SC) — providing support in Florida, Louisiana, Mississippi, Alabama, Georgia, North Carolina, South Carolina, Kentucky, Tennessee, and Puerto Rico
- 88th Readiness Division, at Fort Snelling (MN) — providing support in Washington, Oregon, Idaho, Montana, Wyoming, North Dakota, South Dakota, Utah, Colorado, Nebraska, Kansas, Wisconsin, Michigan, Illinois, Indiana, Minnesota, Iowa, Missouri, and Ohio
- 99th Readiness Division, at Joint Base McGuire-Dix-Lakehurst (NJ) — providing support in New Jersey, New York, New Hampshire, Pennsylvania, Massachusetts, Vermont, Rhode Island, West Virginia, Maryland, Delaware, Maine, Connecticut, and Virginia

=== Functional Commands ===
- 75th Innovation Command, in Houston (TX) subordinate to United States Army Futures and Concepts Command
- 76th Operational Response Command, in Salt Lake City (UT)
- 79th Theater Sustainment Command, in Los Alamitos (CA)
- 80th Training Command (The Army School System), in Richmond (VA) subordinate to United States Army Recruiting Command (USAREC)
  - 94th Training Division (Force Sustainment), at Fort Gregg-Adams (VA)
  - 100th Training Division (Operational Support), at Fort Knox (KY)
  - 102nd Training Division (Maneuver Support), at Fort Leonard Wood (MO)
- 84th Training Command (Combat Support Training), at Fort Knox (KY)
  - 78th Training Division (Operations), at Joint Base McGuire-Dix-Lakehurst (NJ)
  - 86th Training Division (Decisive Action), at Fort McCoy (WI)
  - 87th Training Division, in Birmingham (AL)
  - 91st Training Division (Operations), at Jolon (CA)
- 85th Support Command, in Arlington Heights (IL) — provides training and logistical support to First Army
- 200th Military Police Command, at Fort Meade (MD)
- 311th Signal Command (Theater) subordinate to NETCOM
- 335th Signal Command (Theater), in East Point (GA) subordinate to NETCOM
- 377th Theater Sustainment Command, in Belle Chasse (LA) - subordinate to the United States Army Western Hemisphere Command
- 412th Theater Engineer Command, in Vicksburg (MS)
- 416th Theater Engineer Command, in Darien (IL)
- US Army Reserve Support Command, First Army, at Rock Island Arsenal (IL) subordinate to First Army
- Army Reserve Aviation Command, at Fort Knox (KY)
- Army Reserve Careers Group, at Fort Knox (KY)
- Army Reserve Legal Command, in Gaithersburg (MD)
- Army Reserve Medical Command, in Pinellas Park (FL)
  - 3rd Theater Medical Command, in Forest Park (GA)
  - 807th Medical Command, at Fort Douglas (UT)
- Military Intelligence Readiness Command, at Fort Belvoir (VA)
- U.S. Army Civil Affairs & Psychological Operations Command (Airborne), at Fort Bragg (NC)

== Insignia ==
The shoulder sleeve insignia of USARC is described as "On a disc divided vertically blue and scarlet with a 1/8 inch (0.32 cm) yellow border, 3 inches (7.6 cm) in diameter overall, two white eagles' heads conjoined back to back, beaks yellow, eyes detailed black." The two eagles' heads are symbolic in reference to the command's motto, "Twice the Citizen," and their Reserve mission. The eagle faces in both directions, denoting vigilance and a wide-ranging scope of ability and expertise. Red, white and blue are the colors of the United States, while gold stands for excellence.

The distinctive unit insignia for USARC is a silver color metal and enamel device 1 1/8 inches (2.9 cm) in width overall, consisting of a shield divided palewise silver and blue charged with a tree in full foliage counter changed of the field, all upon two silver sabres saltirewise, points down, the tips overlaying a scarlet motto scroll enclosing the device and terminating at the sword hilts, bearing the inscription "TWICE THE CITIZEN" in silver letters. The symbolism of blue and scarlet, with silver (white), represents the United States, while red stands for courage and sacrifice. The dual responsibilities of citizenship and military service are denoted by the two sabers, and the integration of peaceful with soldierly vocations is represented by the tree on the shield. The nature of these two-fold duties is further symbolized by the division and counter change of the shield, which also recalls the motto of the Command. The tree represents the pursuit and preservation of peace through strength, endurance and growth. The USARC distinctive unit insignia was first authorized on 7 March 1991.
