= Army Reserve Careers Group =

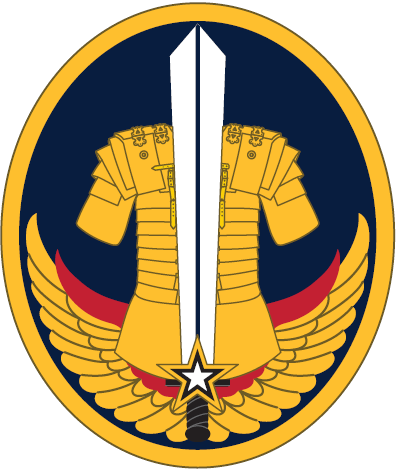
- Active: 2008-present
- Country: United States
- Allegiance: United States Army Reserve
- Branch: United States Army
- Role: Recruiting and Retention
- Size: Command
- Part of: United States Army Reserve Command
- Garrison/HQ: Fort Knox, Kentucky
- Motto: Enihilum Parum (Never Enough)

Commanders
- Current commander: Col. Cory Critchley
- Command Sergeant Major: CSM Jaime Rogers

Insignia
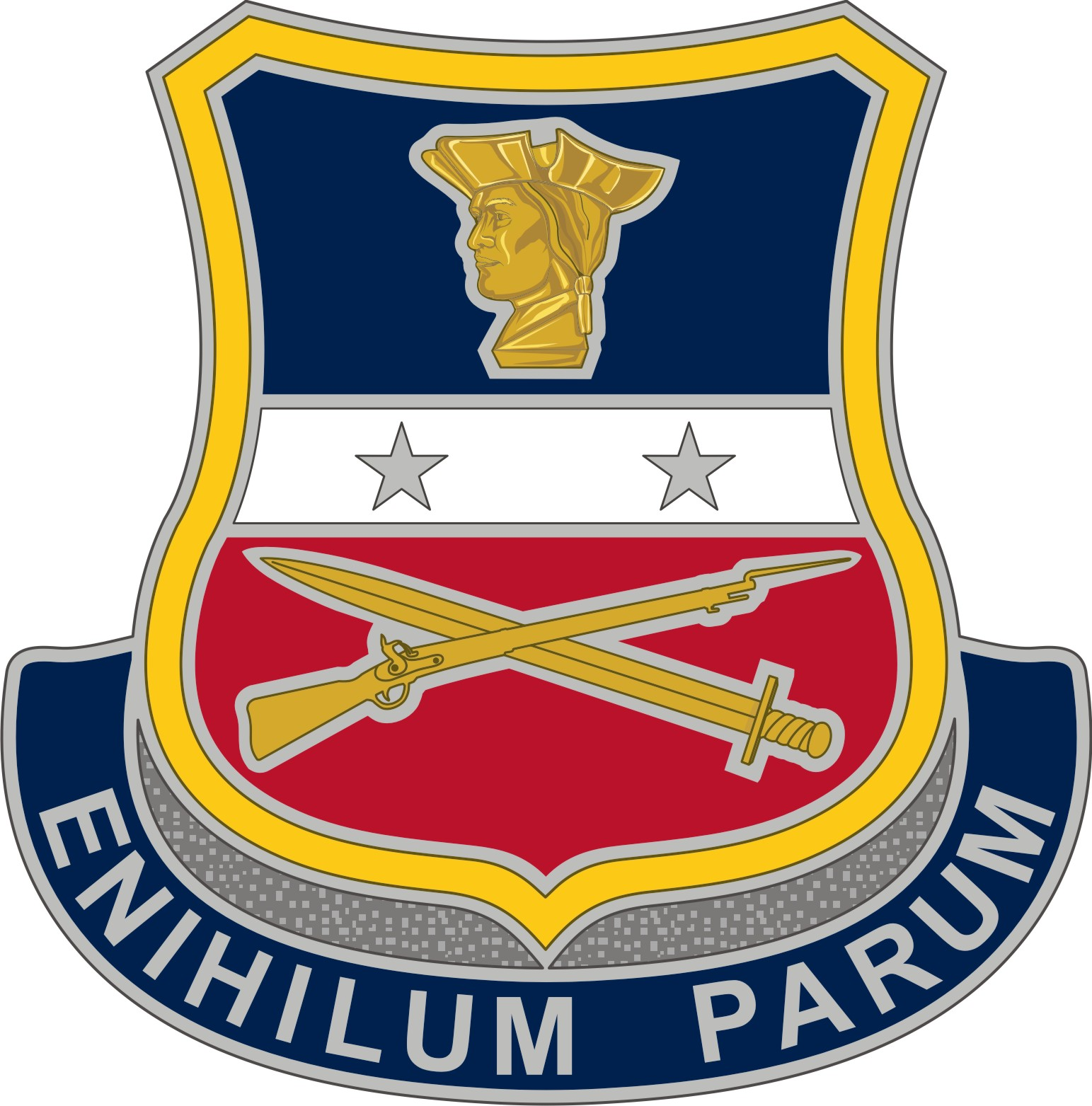
- USARCG DUI

The United States Army Reserve Careers Group (USARCG) is an U.S. Army Reserve command that was originally established in 2008 and called the Army Reserve Careers Division (ARCD) until November 2020. It is headquarters are at Fort Knox, Kentucky. The purpose of the command is to retain soldiers and to assist active duty soldiers find positions in the reserve force.

The USARCG has 13 battalions and supports Army Reserve Career Counselors in their mission to retain and assist reserve soldiers in the Individual Ready Reserve (IRR), Soldiers to the selected reserve (SELRES) and the Army Reserve. It also helps soldiers enter Officer Candidate School (OCS) and become USAR warrant officers.

The USARCG is training it's 79V Career Counselors to be a strategic advisors for their commanders as well as focus on training and retention.

The current commander is Col. Cory Critchley and the Command Sergeant Major is CSM Jaime Rogers.

== Insignia ==
The USARCG's shoulder sleeve insignia (SSI) is an oval containing a pair of gold wings beneath a Roman cuirass (breastplate) under a up pointing sword with a hilt containing the army star.

The distinctive unit insignia (DUI) is a red, white and blue shield with a gold bust of a minuteman in the blue section, two stars in the white and a crossed sword and musket in the red. Below the shield is a scroll with the motto ENIHILUM PARUM (Never Enough).

== Organization ==
- 1st Battalion, Devens Reserve Forces Training Area (Connecticut, Massachusetts, Maine, New Hampshire, New York, Rhode Island, Vermont, European Union)
- 2nd Battalion, Joint Base McGuire-Dix-Lakehurst (Delaware, New Jersey, Pennsylvania)
- 3rd Battalion, Joint Expeditionary Base Little Creek-Fort Story (District of Columbia, Maryland, Virginia, West Virginia)
- 4th Battalion, Nashville, Tenn. (Kentucky, Tennessee, North Carolina, South Carolina)
- 5th Battalion, Orlando, Florida (Florida, Puerto Rico)
- 6th Battalion, Fort Benning (Georgia, Alabama, Mississippi, Louisiana)
- 7th Battalion, Marysville, Wash. (Alaska, American Forces Pacific, American Samoa, Hawaii, Idaho, Northern Marianas, Montana, Oregon, Washington, Wyoming)
- 8th Battalion (North Dakota, South Dakota, Nebraska, Minnesota, Iowa, Wisconsin)
- 9th Battalion, Fort Sheridan, Illinois (Arkansas, Kansas, Missouri, Illinois)
- 10th Battalion, Whitehall, Ohio (Michigan, Indiana, Ohio)
- 11th Battalion, Joint Force Training Base Los Alamitos, Calif. (California, Nevada)
- 12th Battalion, Corpus Christi, Texas (Texas)
- 13th Battalion, Fort Carson, Colo. (Arizona, Colorado, New Mexico, Oklahoma, Utah)
- ARCENT (Kuwait, Iraq, Jordan, Somalia, Qatar, Bahrain, Djibouti, Yemen, Oman, U.A.E., Turkey)
