= Roger W. Sandler =

United States Army general (1934–2026)

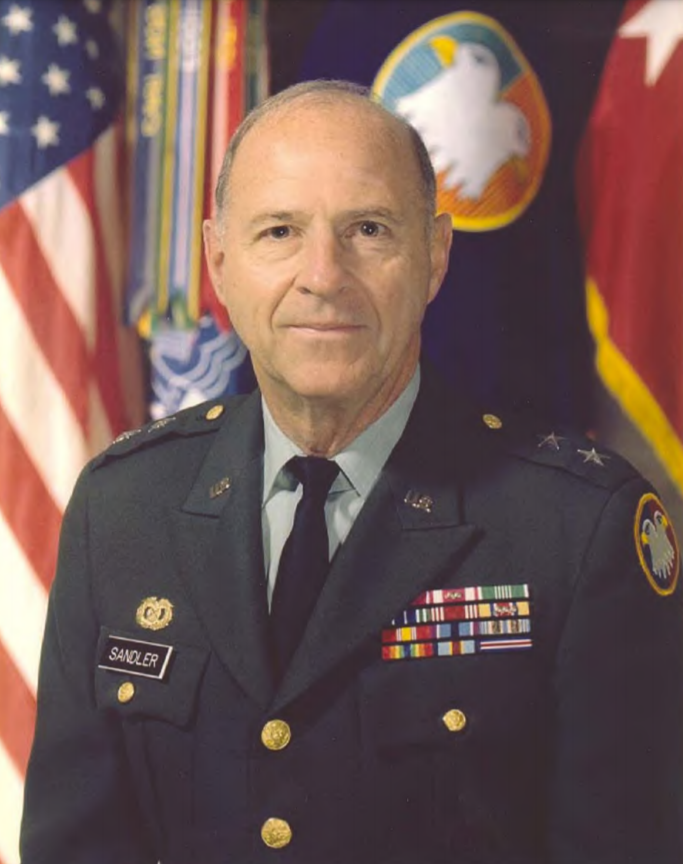
- Official portrait, 1991
- Born: February 23, 1934; New York City, U.S.
- Died: June 23, 2026 (aged 92)
- Military career
- Allegiance: United States
- Branch: United States Army
- Service years: August 1956-February 1994
- Rank: Major general
- Nickname: Warren
- Unit: US Army Reserve Comnand
- Commands: United States Army Reserve
- Other work: National Executive Director, Reserve Officers Association

Roger Warren Sandler (February 23, 1934 – June 23, 2026) was a major general in the United States Army. He was a chief of the United States Army Reserve, a position he held from August 1, 1991 to January 31, 1994.

Sandler died on June 23, 2026, at the age of 92.
