= Robert Harter =

U.S. Army general officer

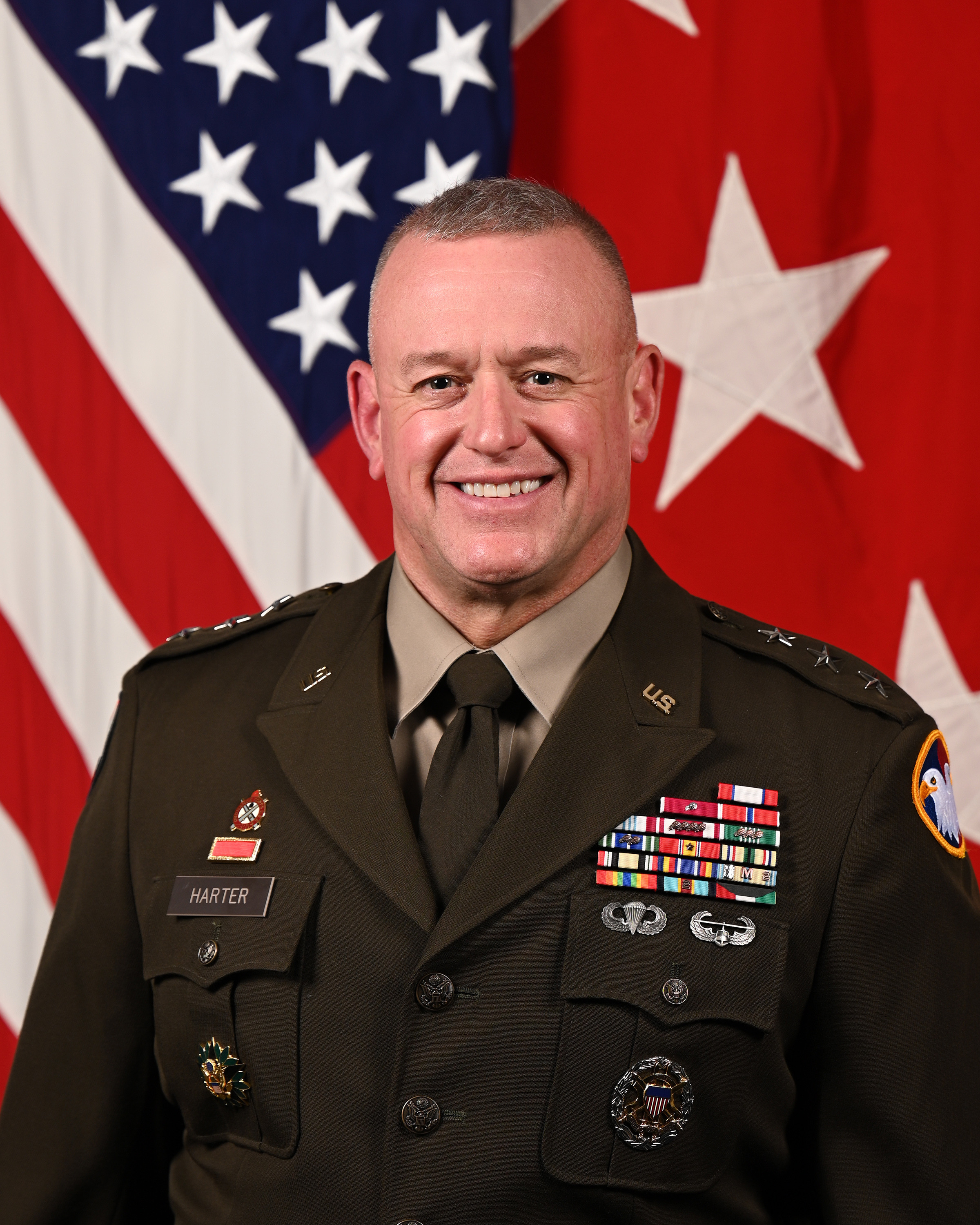
- Official portrait, 2024
- Born: c. 1960 (age 65–66)
- Military career
- Allegiance: United States
- Branch: United States Army; Army Reserve
- Service years: 1988–present
- Rank: Lieutenant General
- Commands: United States Army Reserve Command; 81st Readiness Division; 316th Sustainment Command (Expeditionary); 584th Direct Support Maintenance Company
- Awards: Legion of Merit (2); Bronze Star Medal

Robert D. Harter (born c. 1970) is a United States Army lieutenant general who has served as the chief of the United States Army Reserve and commanding general of the United States Army Reserve Command since 1 August 2024. He most recently served as the commanding general of the 81st Readiness Division. He previously served as the deputy chief of Army Reserve.

In May 2024, Harter was nominated for promotion to lieutenant general and assignment as chief of Army Reserve.

Military offices
Preceded by Rich C. Staats	Commander of the 316th Sustainment Command (Expeditionary); 2016–2019	Succeeded by John T. Johns
Preceded by Michael C. O'Guinn	Deputy Chief of Army Reserve; 2021–2022	Succeeded by Gregory J. Mosser
Preceded by Allan W. Elliott	Chief of Staff and Assistant Deputy Commanding General for Reserve Office of the United States Army Materiel Command; 2019–2021	Succeeded by Walter M. Duzzny
Preceded by Jamelle C. Shawley	Commanding General of the 81st Readiness Division; 2022–2024	Succeeded by Patricia R. Wallace
Preceded by Jody J. Daniels	Chief of the United States Army Reserve and Commanding General of the United States Army Reserve Command; 2024–present	Incumbent
