= Max Baratz =

United States Army general

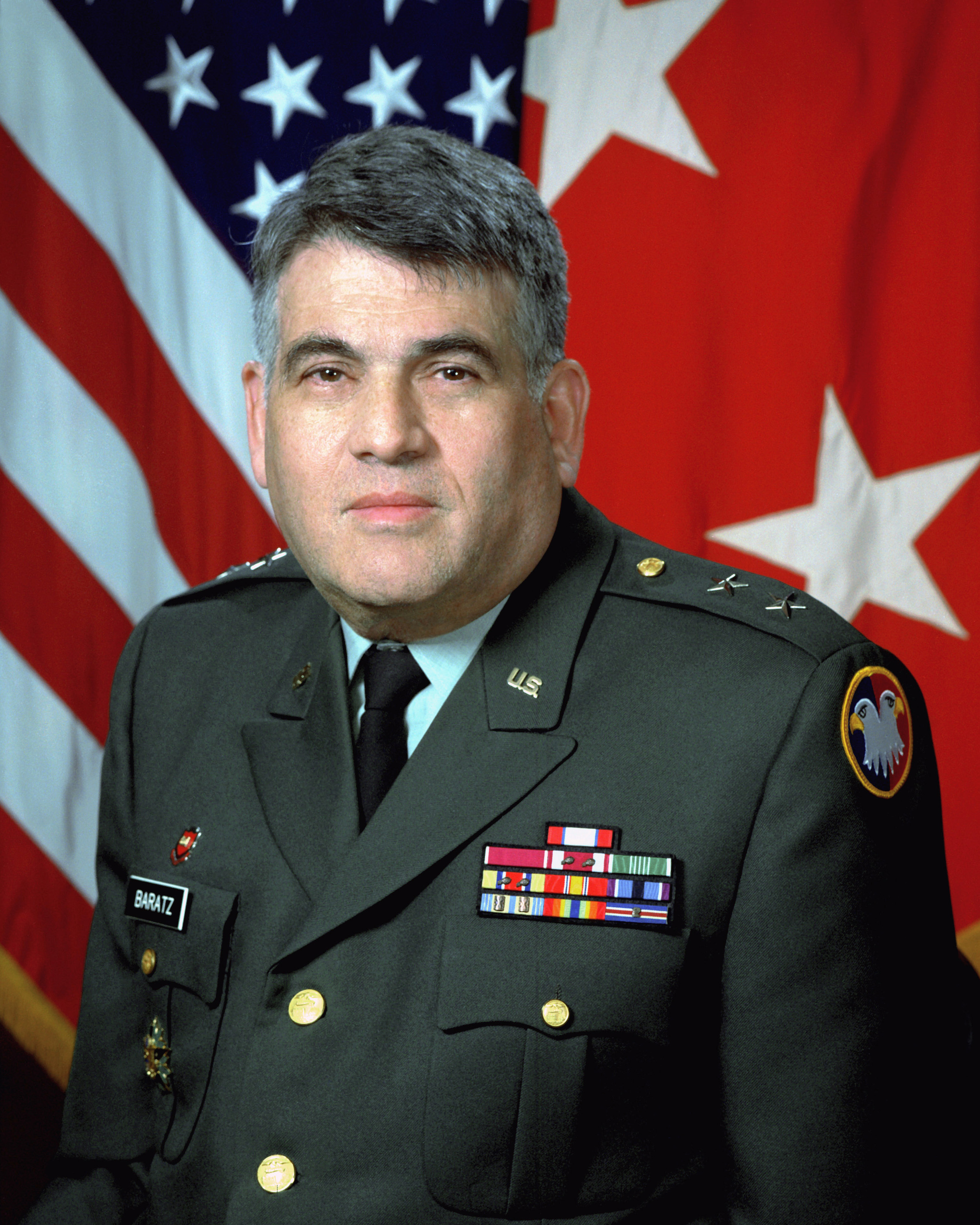
- Born: November 11, 1934 (age 91); Aurora, Illinois, U.S.
- Military career
- Allegiance: United States
- Branch: United States Army
- Rank: Major general
- Commands: United States Army Reserve

Max Baratz (born November 11, 1934) is a retired major general in the United States Army. He is a former chief of the United States Army Reserve, a position he held from February 1, 1994, to May 24, 1998.
