= Deborah Kotulich =

U.S. Army general

Major General Deborah Kotulich
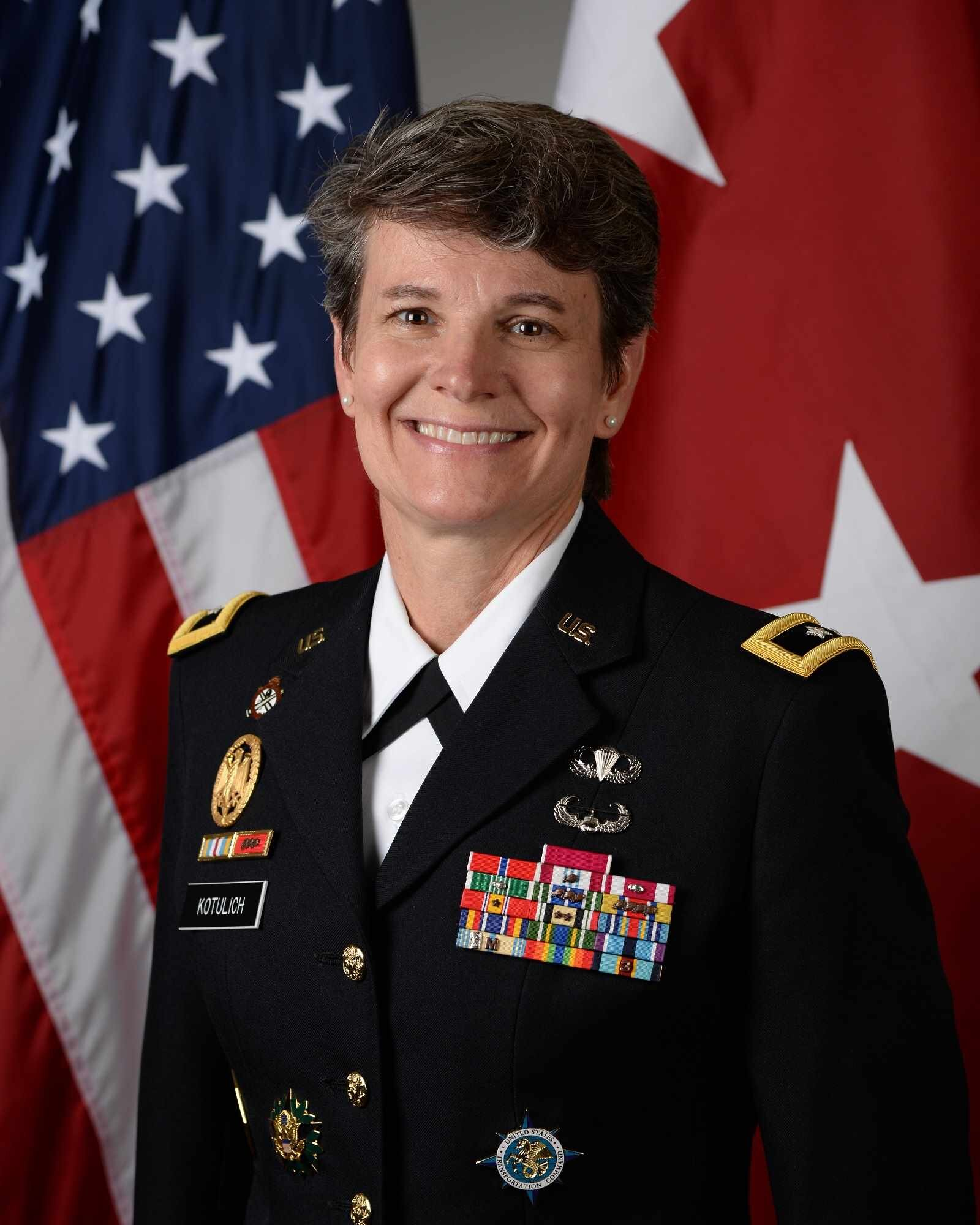
- Official portrait, 2019
- Military career
- Allegiance: United States
- Branch: United States Army; Army Reserve
- Service years: 1990–2025
- Rank: Major General
- Commands: Army Recruiting and Retention Task Force; 143rd Sustainment Command (Expeditionary); 655th Regional Support Group; 359th Transportation Terminal Battalion
- Conflicts: Iraq War; War in Afghanistan
- Awards: Legion of Merit; Bronze Star Medal

Deborah Louise Kotulich is a United States Army major general who has served as the deputy chief of Army Reserve since January 2024. She most recently served as director of the Army Recruiting and Retention Task Force from October 2022 to December 2023. She served as the chief of staff of The Naming Commission from November 2021 to its dissolution in October 2022, and as chief of staff of the United States Transportation Command from 2019 to 2021. Previously, she served as commander of the 143rd Sustainment Command (Expeditionary).

Kotulich is a 1990 graduate of the United States Military Academy with a Bachelor of Science degree in engineering. She later earned a Master of Science degree in national resource strategy from the Eisenhower School at the National Defense University.

Military offices
Preceded by ???	Commander of the 143rd Sustainment Command (Expeditionary); 2016–2019	Succeeded by Pamela McGaha
Preceded by John C. Flournoy	Chief of Staff of the United States Transportation Command; 2019–2021	Succeeded by Vincent B. Barker
New office	Chief of Staff of The Naming Commission; 2021–2022	Commission dissolved
New office	Director of the Army Recruiting and Retention Task Force; 2022–2023	Vacant
Preceded by Gregory J. Mosser	Deputy Chief of Army Reserve; 2024–present	Incumbent
