= Frank Edward Lowe =

American army officer (1885–1968)

Frank Edward Lowe (September 20, 1885 – December 27, 1968) was a trusted advisor to US President Harry Truman during the Korean War. Lowe acted as President Harry Truman's "eyes and ears" in Korea. At the onset of the war in 1950, Truman asked the 65-year-old general to come out of retirement to be his personal representative. The two-star general traveled Korea with a presidential letter that authorized him to "go where he chose, read what he wanted, and report what he pleased."

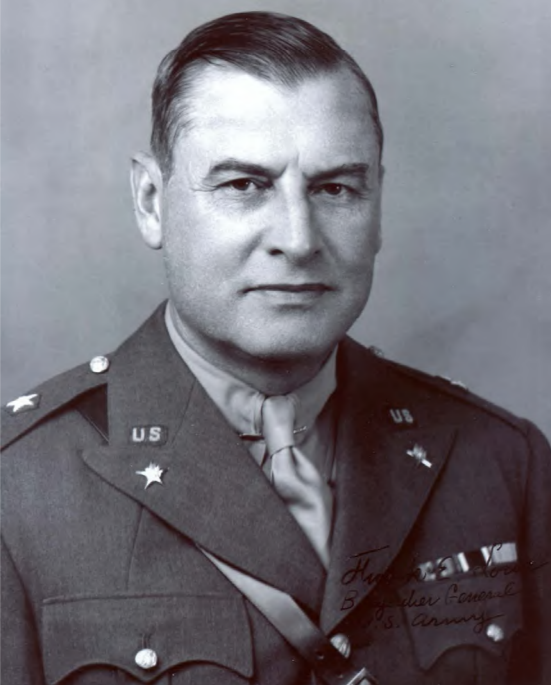
Brigadier General Frank Edward Lowe

== Early life ==
Frank E. Lowe was born in Springfield, Massachusetts, on September 20, 1885 to George Lowe and Mary Jackson. He graduated from Worcester South High School in 1904. He graduated from the Worcester Polytechnic Institute in Worcester, Massachusetts in 1908 with a bachelor of science degree in mechanical engineering. He played football and baseball for the college. In 1911 Lowe married Rachel Lowell, a botanist and plant collector with a special interest in ferns. From 1908 to 1917, he worked as a self-employed mining engineer consultant, ran a construction company, and was a consultant in the oil fields of southwestern United States and central Mexico.

== World War 1 ==
Lowe enlisted in 1917 at Leon Springs Military Reservation (San Antonio, TX). He attended ROTC at Williams College in Massachusetts and Second Officers Training Camp at Camp Stanley in Texas. He was commissioned as captain of Field Artillery in November 1917.

Lowe assumed command of Company B, 316th Ammunition Train at Camp Travis Texas. He was an instructor at Camp Stanley Texas until April 1918 when he was transferred to Camp Jackson, South Carolina and later to Camp Wadsworth near Spartanburg South Carolina.

In August 1918 Lowe was sent to France as commander of the Park Battery of the III Corps Artillery Park, American Expeditionary Forces in France and served in the Meuse-Argonne Offensive in October and November 1918. He was gassed twice sustaining only minor injuries.

Lowe returned from France in 1919 receiving an honorable discharge.

In 1921 he moved to Maine as president of the Kennebec Wharf and Coal Company. He also owned the Citizens Coal Company, a retail fuel distributor.

Lowe served in the Army Reserves from 1922 to 1938 achieving the rank of full colonel.

== World War 2 ==
In 1940 Lowe was the first reserve officer selected for active duty in the National Defense Program, serving as the executive for reserve and ROTC affairs. In 1941 Lowe spent time in London as an observer at the American Embassy.

Lowe was the executive for reserve and ROTC affairs seeing the activation of thousands of reserve officers. He was promoted to brigadier general in July 1941 serving in the office of the chief of staff. He was assigned to the Special Committee of the Senate to Investigate the National Defense Program. In that roll, in 1943 he met and worked with Senator Harry Truman, chairman of the committee. Truman nominated Lowe for a promotion to major general.

Truman had also served as a field artillery captain in World War 1 giving him a common bond with Lowe.

Lowe retired from active duty September 16, 1946, moving to Harrison, Maine.

== Korean War ==
Lowe was recalled to active duty in August 1950 tasked by President Truman to be his personal representative. Lowe acted as the President's "eyes and ears" in Korea, frequently being on the front lines, earning the Distinguished Service Cross for his bravery shown during his tour of Korea.

The citation reads, in part: "Accepting personal hazards far beyond the requirements of his mission, he devoted long periods of time with the forward elements of our major units in combat in order that he might better observe and evaluate the battle efficiency of the United Nations Command. . . [He] distinguished himself by extraordinary heroism in action against the enemy between August 19, 1950 and April 9, 1951."

A 1951 Time Magazine article calls Lowe, "Truman's private eye in Japan and Korea." The piece quotes Lowe as saying, “I am not an aide, understand,” he explained. “There is some question whether I am an aid to anybody. I am serving the President in an executive capacity. The reason I am wearing a uniform is because the old man asked me to. I am not a spy out here. He asked me to help out and I love him, so here I am.”

The article includes a story that gives insight into the man Lowe was, "In the evacuation of Hungnam, Lowe came out in the last wave. There he saw a soldier accidentally shot in the foot by a careless machine gunner. Aware that the G.I. might be accused of shooting himself in the classic method of avoiding combat, General Lowe bustled up. “My name is Frank Lowe,” said he. “If anybody ever questions your story of how you got shot, tell him General Lowe saw it and go ask him what happened.”

Lowe retired from active duty May 7, 1951.

He was active in the Reserve Officers Association of the United States and the American Legion, serving the organization as the national vice-commander.

== Awards and decorations ==
Distinguished Service Cross; Air Medal; Army Commendation Medal; World War I Victory Medal with two bronze battle stars for Meuse-Argonne and Defensive Sector; Army of Occupation Germany Medal; American Defense Service Medal with Foreign Service Clasp; American Campaign Medal; Asiatic-Pacific Campaign Medal; European African-Middle Eastern Campaign Medal; World War II Victory Medal; Philippine Liberation Medal with one Bronze Star; Korean Service Medal; and Legion of Merit Taigut (Republic of Korea).

== Death ==
Lowe died on December 27, 1968 at the Veterans Administration Hospital in Togus, Maine where was a patient for about six months. Funeral services were held at the Cathedral Church of St. Luke in Portland, Maine. He was buried in Hope Cemetery, Worcester, MA.

Rachel Lowell Lowe died on March 28, 1978 in West Paris Maine. She is buried with her husband.
