= Office of the Chief, Army Reserve =

Headquarters staff and support element to the U.S. Chief of Army Reserve

Office of the Chief of Army Reserve
- Seal of the US Army Reserve
- Country: United States
- Allegiance: Federal
- Branch: United States Army Reserve
- Garrison/HQ: Pentagon, Washington DC

The Office of the Chief of Army Reserve (OCAR) is located at Fort Belvoir, Virginia, and provides the chief of Army Reserve (CAR) with a staff of functional advisors who develop and execute Army Reserve plans, policies and programs, plus administer Army Reserve personnel, operations and funding. The CAR is responsible for plans, policies and programs affecting all Army Reserve Soldiers, including those who report directly to the Army. OCAR is made up of specialized groups that advise and support the CAR on a wide variety of issues.

== Mission ==
- Functional specialists within OCAR analyze issues, liaise with other government agencies and develop and implement new initiatives. Examples are the Force Programs Directorate and the Strategic Human Resources Group.
- Administrative offices within OCAR handle technical requirements and support; contracting, budgeting and financial management; and communications. Examples are Enterprise Services Activity and the Chief Financial Management Office.
- The Executive staff includes the leaders of the Army Reserve and their aides. This includes the CAR, the Deputy Chiefs of the Army Reserve, Command Chief Warrant Officer and the Command Sergeant Major.

== History ==
The Army Reserve Command (USARC) came into existence in 1989 with the establishment of the USARC headquarters at Ft. McPherson, Georgia. The Chief, US Army Reserve (CAR), Major General William Ward became the first USARC commander. He was dual hatted as CG and CAR. In 1991, MG Ward retired and turned the command over to MG Roger Sandler, the newly appointed CAR.

During the tenure of MG Sandler the five continental Armys (CONUSAS) transferred their previous command and management responsibilities to the USARC, putting total command and control of the subordinate units under the USARC. MG Max Baratz, the Deputy Commander of the USARC, became the day-to-day manager of all USARC activities.

In 1994, MG Baratz was named CAR and USARC Commander upon the retirement of MG Sandler.

In 1998, MG Plewes was named CAR and Commander of the USARC, replacing MG Baratz. He became the first CAR to become a LTG in the position. It had long been argued, that with the added responsibility of Command & Control, the CAR/USARC Commander, should carry the increased rank of LTG.

The two eagles' heads of the shoulder sleeve insignia for OCAR are in reference to the motto of United States Army Reserve Command, "Twice the Citizen", and its mission.
