= United States Army Reserve =

Reserve force of the United States Army

- Seal of the U.S. Army Reserve
- Founded: 23 April 1908; 118 years ago (as Medical Reserve Corps)
- Country: United States
- Branch: United States Army
- Size: 188,703 reservists
- Part of: United States Department of the Army; Reserve components of the United States Armed Forces
- Garrison/HQ: Fort Bragg, North Carolina, U.S.
- Website: www.usar.army.mil

Commanders
- Chief: LTG Robert Harter
- Deputy Chief: MG Deborah Kotulich
- Command Chief Warrant Officer: CW5 LaShon P. White
- Command Sergeant Major: CSM Gregory Betty

The United States Army Reserve (USAR) is a reserve force of the United States Army. Together, the Army Reserve and the Army National Guard constitute the Army element of the reserve components of the United States Armed Forces.

== History ==
=== Origins ===
On 23 April 1908 Congress created the Medical Reserve Corps, the official predecessor of the Army Reserve. After World War I, under the National Defense Act of 1920, Congress reorganized the U.S. land forces by authorizing a Regular Army, a National Guard and an Organized Reserve (Officers Reserve Corps and Enlisted Reserve Corps) of unrestricted size, which later became the Army Reserve. This organization provided a peacetime pool of trained Reserve officers and enlisted men for use in war. The Organized Reserve included the Officers Reserve Corps, Enlisted Reserve Corps and Reserve Officers' Training Corps (ROTC).

=== Interwar period and World War II ===
The Organized Reserve infantry divisions raised immediately after World War I generally continued the lineage and geographic area distribution of National Army divisions that had served in the war. They were maintained on paper with a maximum of all of their officers and one-third of their enlisted men. Units in other arms of the Army besides infantry were also maintained, such as field artillery, coast artillery, cavalry, engineers, medical, signal, quartermaster, and ordnance. In March 1926, the War Department authorized the manning of Regular Army units being maintained in an "inactive" status with Organized Reserve officers, eliminating the previously used "Active Affiliate" program for these units. Nearly all "Regular Army Inactive" (RAI) infantry regiments and many other units were "affiliated" with Reserve Officers Training Corps (ROTC) units in their vicinity. The professor of military science and tactics at the school or the senior Regular Army officer of the unit's branch assigned to the ROTC program served as the unit commander, and the unit was populated with graduates of the program. By 1 October 1933, command of all RAI units had been turned over to Reserve officers. A number of the affiliations became defunct throughout the 1930s, but RAI units were among the most active in the Reserve.

The ultimate use of Organized Reserve units and personnel remained unclear in the interwar period. While Army regulations stated that "The ultimate objective in training units of the Organized Reserve in time of peace is to provide partially trained units which may be readily expanded to war strength and completely trained in time of emergency," historian William J. Woolley wrote that, "The question of whether reserve units were to be chiefly concerned with mobilizing and training a conscripted citizen army or were to be contingents of a nearly ready combat force was never resolved in the 1930s, and reforms in training efforts often shifted between one and the other of the two objectives." Service in the Organized Reserve during the interwar period was not as appealing as the Army expected, and suffered because of limited funding that restricted training opportunities. Weekly inactive training drills were unpaid, and the average Organized Reserve officer was ordered to active duty for two weeks of paid training only once every three or four years; some officers trained nearly every year, to the detriment of others who had to wait as long as seven years between training opportunities. Turnover in the Officers' Reserve Corps was high, as many men in mandatory ROTC had little interest in military affairs, and allowed their five-year commissions to expire without applying for reappointment. By the beginning of the 1930s, ROTC graduates became the single largest cohort of officers in the Officers' Reserve Corps.

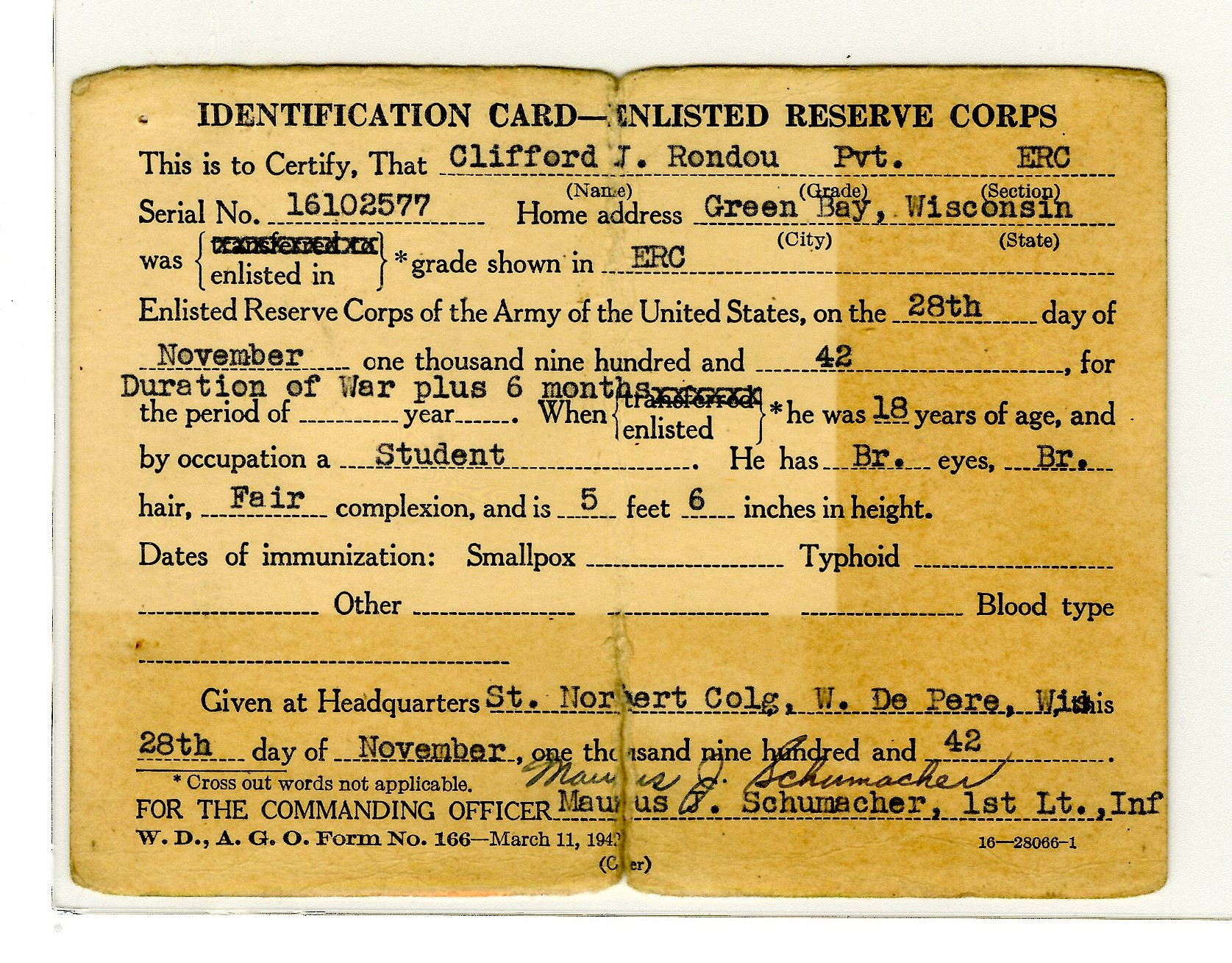
Enlisted Reserve Corps (ERC) identification, 1942.

The original Regular Army Reserve, established in 1916 but abolished in 1920, had been chiefly composed of former Regular Army soldiers or National Guardsmen through reenlistment, but the small annual stipend as an incentive for joining was not included in the Enlisted Reserve Corps (ERC). Another problem with the Enlisted Reserve Corps was the few avenues through which someone could join. Enlistment in the ERC was restricted to those men "who have had such military or technical training as may be prescribed by regulations of the Secretary of War." One means to join the ERC was through the ROTC or Citizens Military Training Camps (CMTC). If a man had completed at least one year in ROTC, or had completed one 4-week CMTC camp, he could also enlist in the ERC. Each year of participation in ROTC and completion of each CMTC camp earned the participant promotions in the ERC. Some enlisted reservists went on to receive commissions in a few years, thus leaving the ranks of the ERC. The final way one could enter the ERC was if he (or she, in the case of nurses) possessed skills needed by the Army that required no prior military training, such as nursing, railroad occupations, certain communications fields, and music. Interestingly, a substantial number of enlisted reservists in the interwar period, at least into the early 1930s, were bandsmen. Because of these restrictions, the ERC maintained an average strength of only about 3,500 men and women, and never more than 6,000 at any time from 1919 to 1941; most divisions reached their full complement of officers but had less than 100 enlisted men.

On 6 February 1942, President Franklin D. Roosevelt signed Executive Order 9049, which ordered "into the active military service of the United States...for the duration of the present war and for six months after the termination thereof...each of the organizations and units and all of the personnel of the Organized Reserve not already in such service;" because most Reserve officers were already on active duty, this amounted to a “public relations” document. Because of the course of the mobilization of 1940–1941, "few of the Reserve officers originally assigned to...units were available for duty with them. Consequently, the units as activated bore small resemblance to those of peacetime." The order and timetable in which Organized Reserve infantry divisions were ordered to active duty was based upon the number of World War I battle honors earned (if applicable), the location and availability of training sites, and the ability of the Army to furnish divisional cadres and filler replacements.

=== Cold War ===
A tentative troop basis for the Organized Reserve Corps (ORC), prepared in March 1946, outlined 25 divisions: three armored, five airborne, and 17 infantry. These divisions and all other Organized Reserve Corps units were to be maintained in one of three strength categories, labeled Class A, Class B, and Class C. Class A units were divided into two groups, one for combat and one for service, and units were to be at required table of organization strength; Class B units were to have their full complement of officers and enlisted cadre strength; and Class C were to have officers only. The troop basis listed nine divisions as Class A, nine as Class B, and seven as Class C.

=== Post Cold War ===
In the post-Cold War draw-down, all of the Army Reserve's combat units were disbanded, except the 100th Battalion, 442nd Infantry Regiment. This meant the disestablishment of the three remaining Army Reserve fighting brigades: the 157th Infantry Brigade (Mechanized) (Separate) of Pennsylvania, the 187th Infantry Brigade (Separate) of Massachusetts, and the 205th Infantry Brigade (Separate) (Light) of Minnesota. Many of the Army Reserve training divisions were realigned as institutional training divisions.

With the Army National Guard providing reserve component combat formations and related combat support units, the Army Reserve is configured to provide combat support, combat service support, peacekeeping, nation-building and civil support capability. With roughly twenty percent of the Army's organized units and 5.3 percent of the Army's budget, the Army Reserve provides about half of the Army's combat support and a quarter of the Army's mobilization base expansion capability.

== Reserve service today ==
The United States Army Reserve was composed of 188,703 soldiers as of late 2020.

== Current active reserve formations and units ==
=== Headquarters commands ===
Army Reserve Headquarters - Fort Bragg (formerly United States Army Reserve Command (USARC)) located at Fort Bragg, North Carolina

Through USARC, the CAR commands all Army Reserve units. USARC is responsible for the staffing, training, management, and deployment of units to ensure readiness for Army missions. The Army Reserve consists of three main categories of units: operational and functional, support, and training. Due to Base Realignment and Closure Act, the headquarters of USAR moved to Fort Bragg.

Army Reserve Staff - National Capital Region (NCR) (formerly Office of the Chief of Army Reserve (OCAR)) located at both Fort Belvoir, Virginia and The Pentagon

OCAR provides the Chief of Army Reserve (CAR) with a staff of functional advisors who develop and execute Army Reserve plans, policies and programs, plus administer Army Reserve personnel, operations, and funding. The CAR is responsible for plans, policies and programs affecting all Army Reserve Soldiers, including those who report directly to the Army. OCAR is composed of specialized groups that advise and support the CAR on a wide variety of issues.

== See also ==
- Uniformed Services Employment and Reemployment Rights Act
- Command Sergeant Major of the US Army Reserve
- Command Chief Warrant Officer of the US Army Reserve

Comparable organizations

- Army National Guard (U.S. Army)
- United States Marine Corps Reserve
- United States Navy Reserve
- United States Coast Guard Reserve
- Air National Guard (U.S. Air Force)
- Air Force Reserve Command (U.S. Air Force)
- Militia (China)
