= United States Army Combined Arms Command =

U.S. Army's command for leader development and professional education

Coordinates: 39°21′05″N 94°54′54″W

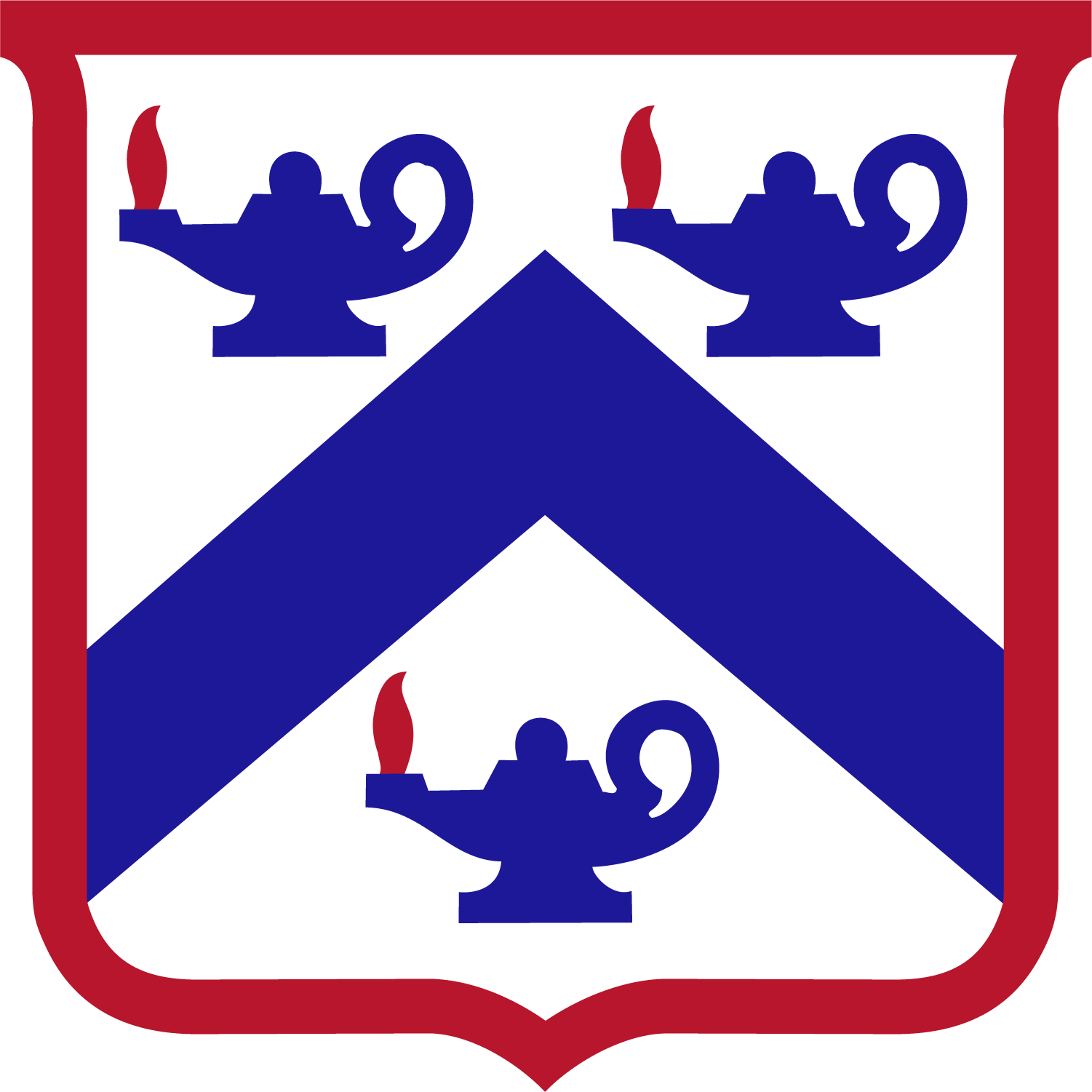
- USACAC Shoulder Sleeve Insignia
- Active: 1973–present
- Country: United States
- Branch: United States Army
- Role: Provides leadership and supervision for leader development and professional military and civilian education.
- Size: 58,000
- Part of: Transformation and Training Command
- Garrison/HQ: Fort Leavenworth, Kansas
- Mottos: "Ad Bellum Pace Parati" (Latin) "Prepared in peace for war"

Commanders
- Current commander: LTG James P. Isenhower III

Insignia
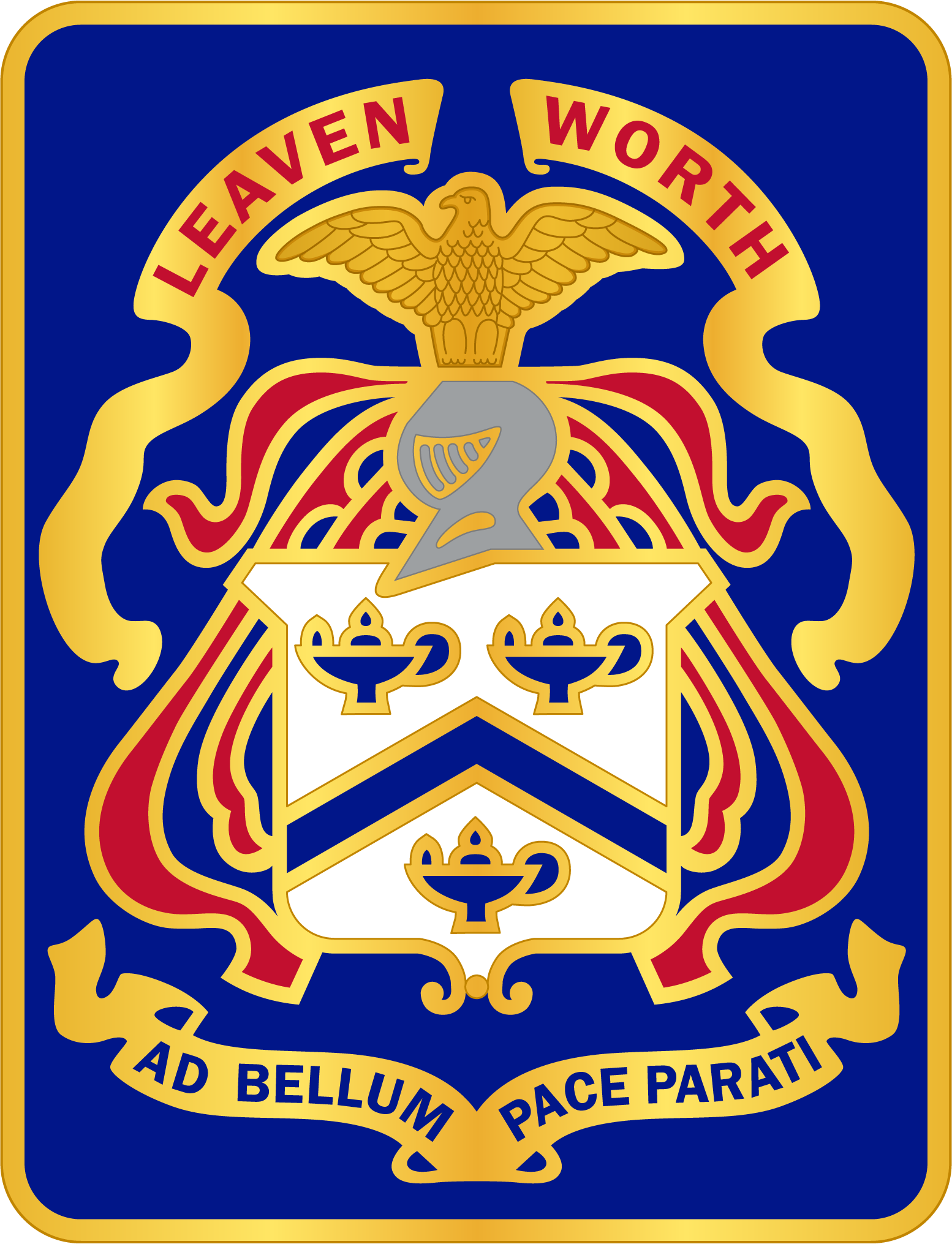
- Distinctive Unit Insignia

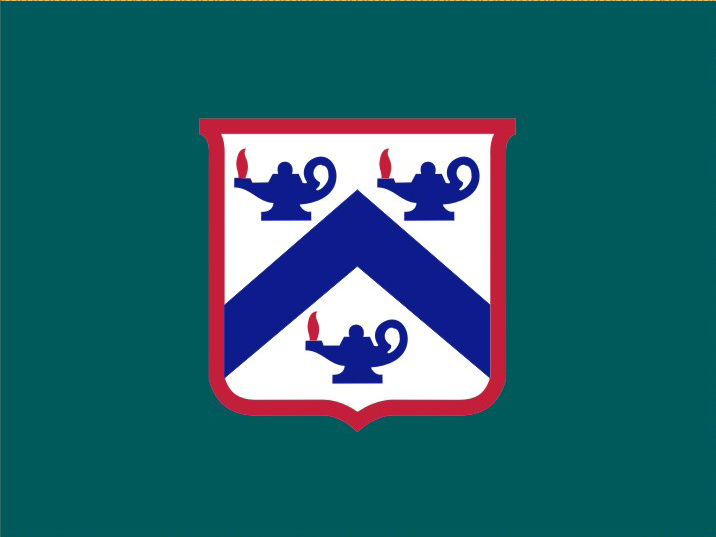
- Flag

The U.S. Army Combined Arms Command (USACAC) is located at Fort Leavenworth and provides leadership and supervision for leader development and professional military and civilian education; institutional and collective training; functional training; training support; battle command; doctrine; lessons learned and specified areas the Commanding General, United States Army Training and Doctrine Command (TRADOC) designates in order to serve as a catalyst for change and to support developing relevant and ready expeditionary land formations with campaign qualities in support of the joint force commander.

== Components ==
Major Components (most based in Fort Leavenworth) are:

- The Army University, which was created in 2015 and charged with directly integrating 70 separate U.S. Army Training and Doctrine Command (TRADOC) internal school programs under one university system while also synchronizing instruction with more than 100 additional TRADOC institutions. Subcomponents include:
  - United States Army War College
  - The U.S. Army Command and General Staff College (the Army's graduate school and the command's most famous institution)
  - U.S. Army Management Staff College
  - U.S. Army Warrant Officer Career College
  - United States Army Noncommissioned Officer Academy (USANCOA)
    - Sergeants Major Academy
    - Fort Bliss NCO Academy
  - Army University Press is the U.S. Army's top multimedia publishing house. In 2015, Army University brought the Combat Studies Institute, Military Review, and the NCO Journal together to form Army Press, which was later renamed Army University Press in 2017. They publish journals, books, and films to benefit Army leaders at all levels. The Staff Ride Team designs and executes both live and virtual staff rides. These provide essential insights into military operations, leadership, and the human dimension of warfare through focused study, methodical field study, and detailed analysis of insights gained. The Films Team creates thoroughly researched and historically accurate documentaries to educate viewers about the U.S. Army doctrine as it exists now.
  - Army Strategic Education Program
  - U.S. Army Heritage and Education Center
  - United States Army Center of Military History
- Combined Arms Command for Training
  - Mission Command Training Program
  - National Simulations Center
  - Center for Army Lessons Learned
- Mission Command Center of Excellence (MCCoE): established in 2010 as the focal point in the development, integration, and synchronization of leader development, Army profession, and mission command doctrine, organization, training, materiel, leadership and education, personnel, facilities requirements, and policy solutions (DOTMLPF-P). Mission Command is the Army's approach to command and control that empowers subordinate decision making and decentralized execution appropriate to the situation. Mission Command supports the Army's operational concept of unified land operations and its emphasis on seizing, retaining, and exploiting the initiative. (ADP 6–0)
  - Mission: MCCoE, as the lead for the Mission Command Force Modernization Proponent and the Command and Control Warfighting Function, conducts continuous DOTMLPF-P analysis to identify, develop, integrate, and synchronize C2 requirements and solutions in order to best prepare leaders and formations to successfully exercise the C2 of multidomain operations during competition, crisis, and conflict, across the competition continuum.
  - Subordinate Organizations:
  - Army Joint Support Team (AJST)
  - Air Land Sea Application (ALSA) Center
  - Combined Arms Doctrine Directorate (CADD)
  - Command Assessment Program Directorate (CAPD)
  - Center for the Army Profession and Leadership (CAPL)
  - Directorate of Training (DOT)
  - Force Modernization Proponent Center (FMPC)
  - Mission Command Network Integration (MCNI)
  - Security Force Assistance Proponent (SFAP)
  - Mission Command Capability Development Integration Directorate (MC CDID)
- The United States Army SHARP Academy

Other Components are:

- Fort Irwin National Training Center, Fort Irwin (NTC)
  - 916th Support Brigade
- Joint Readiness Training Center, Fort Polk (JRTC)
- Aviation Center of Excellence (USAACE)
- Cyber Center of Excellence (CCoE)
  - Cyber School
  - Signal School
- Fires Center of Excellence (FCoE)
  - Field Artillery School
  - Air Defense Artillery School
- Intelligence Center of Excellence (ICoE)
- Maneuver Center of Excellence (MCoE)
  - Armor School
  - Infantry School
    - Officer Candidate School
- Maneuver Support Center of Excellence (MSCoE)
  - Engineer School
  - Chemical, Biological, Radiological, and Nuclear (CBRN) School
  - Military Police School
- Medical Department Center and School (MEDCoE)
- Mission Command Center of Excellence (MCCoE)
- Sustainment Center of Excellence (SCoE) (Combined Arms Support Command (CASCOM))
  - Adjutant General School
  - Army Sustainment University
    - Logistics Leader College
    - College of Professional and Continuing Education
    - Army Sustainment (professional publication)
    - NCO Academy
      - Transportation
      - Ordnance
      - Quartermaster
  - Soldier Support Institute
  - Financial Management School
  - Ordnance School
  - Quartermaster School
    - Joint Culinary Center of Excellence
  - Transportation School
- Space and Missile Defense Center of Excellence (SMDCoE)
- The Special Operations Center of Excellence (SOCoE)

== Overview ==
Fort Leavenworth, Kansas is the oldest continuously operating Regular Army installation west of the Mississippi River. This historic post, noted for its campus setting, open green spaces and hometown character, is the home of the U.S. Army's Combined Arms Command (CAC). CAC, as a major subordinate headquarters of the U.S. Army Training and Doctrine Command, has often been referred to as the "Intellectual Center of the Army". It is, in many regards, "home base" for the majority of field grade officers across the Army.

Since 1882, CAC and its predecessor organizations have been engaged in the primary mission of preparing the Army and its leaders for war. At present, this mission is divided between preparing the Army for the Global War on Terrorism and transforming it to meet future threats.

In order to accomplish these critical missions, CAC provides Army-wide leadership and supervision for leader development and professional military and civilian education; institutional and collective training; functional training; training support; battle command; doctrine; lessons learned; and other specified areas that the TRADOC Commander designates. All of these are focused toward making CAC a catalyst for change and to support the development of a relevant and ready ground force to support joint, interagency and multinational operations anywhere in the world.

== Organizational structure ==
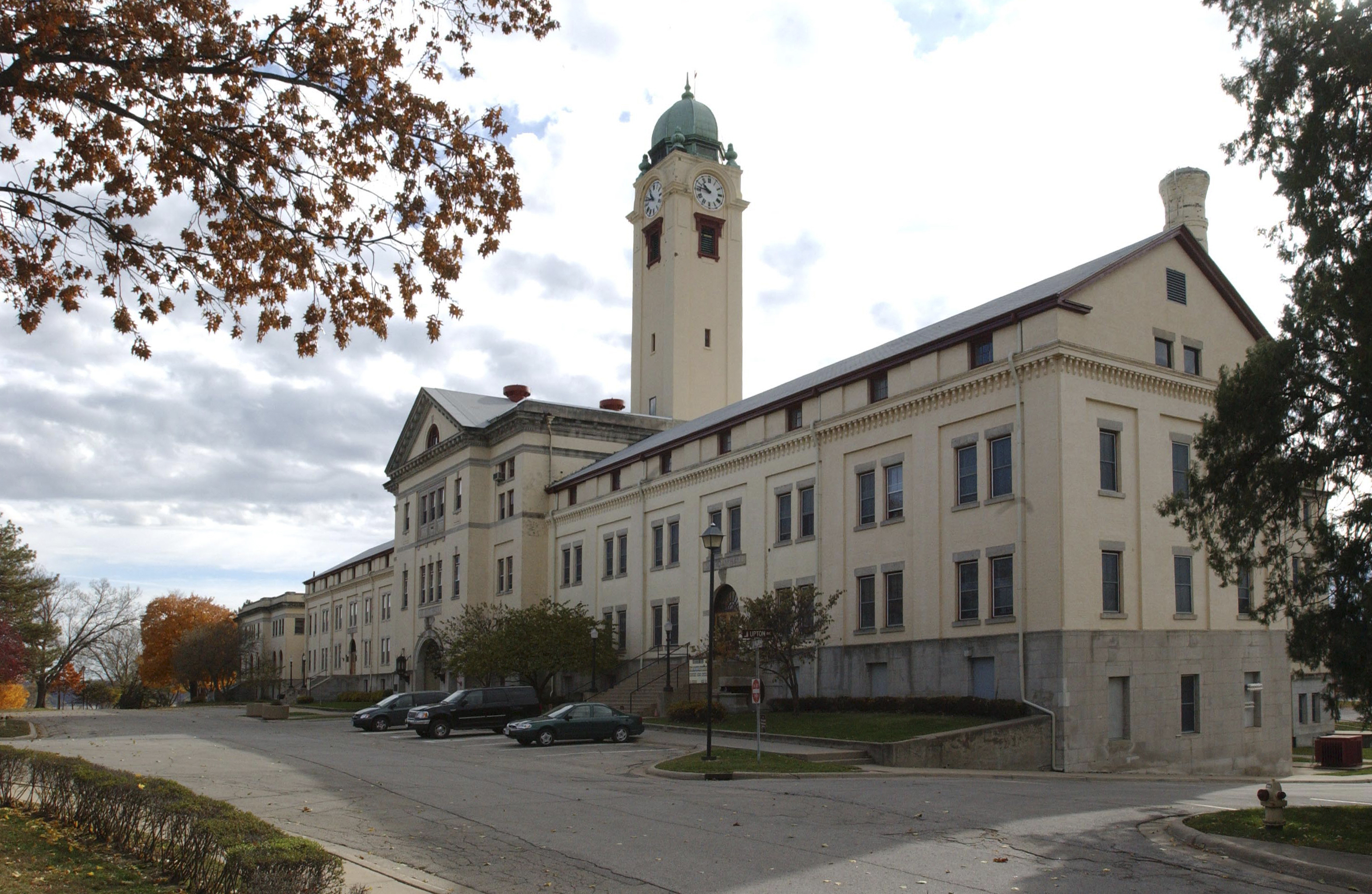
Grant Hall is the headquarters of the U.S. Army Combined Arms Command.

The Combined Arms Command is organized along four basic levels:

The commander exercises overall responsibility over assigned personnel and subordinate organizations to ensure that assigned missions are accomplished in the most efficient and effective manner possible. The Command Sergeant Major, by tradition, is responsible for the conduct and development of enlisted soldiers and non-commissioned officers across the command.

The CAC Chief of Staff manages and oversees the activities of a coordinating staff and a special staff. The coordinating staff is focused on policy and procedure development for the command; the special staff provides command-wide advice in specialized or technical areas.

Major subordinate organizations carry out the majority of the functions assigned to the CAC commander. In general, each is resourced for and focused on a core function and one or more specified functions.

Schools, centers and specialized activities are spread across the country and are responsible for executing a portion of the CAC mission. In general, each of these organizations is responsible for the training of specific branch skills (such as "Infantry") and serving as the Army's functional expert in that area. In this regard, CAC is an integrator of specialized skills, on one hand, and an executor of common skills, on the other.

== Military Review ==
Since 1922, the center has published the bimonthly journal Military Review.

== Commanders ==
Since 1976 commandant of the college has been a Lieutenant General (three stars). David Petraeus was a commandant immediately before going to command the Multinational Force - Iraq.

- Lieutenant General James C. Riley from Jul 2001 to Jun 2003
- Lieutenant General William S. Wallace from Jul 2003 to Oct 2005
- Lieutenant General David H. Petraeus from Oct 2005 to Feb 2007
- Lieutenant General William B. Caldwell IV from Jun 2007 to Nov 2009
- Lieutenant General Robert L. Caslen Jr. from Feb 2010 to Sep 2011
- Lieutenant General David G. Perkins from Nov 2011 to Feb 2014
- Lieutenant General Robert B. Brown from Feb 2014 to Apr 2016
- Lieutenant General Michael Lundy from Apr 2016 to Dec 2019
- Lieutenant General James E. Rainey from Dec 2019 to May 2021
- Lieutenant General Theodore D. Martin from May 2021 to October 2022
- Lieutenant General Milford H. Beagle Jr. from October 2022 to September 2025
- Lieutenant General James P. Isenhower III from November 2025 to Present

=== Command Sergeants Major ===
- Command Sergeant Major L. H. Smith 1991–1993
- Command Sergeant Major Edward D. Naylor 1993–1997
- Command Sergeant Major Cynthia A. Pritchett 1997–2003
- Command Sergeant Major John D. Sparks 2003–2005
- Command Sergeant Major Cory N. McCarty 2005–2007
- Command Sergeant Major David M. Bruner 2007–2008
- Command Sergeant Major Philip F. Johndrow 2008–2011
- Command Sergeant Major Christopher K. Greca 2011–2013
- Command Sergeant Major Jeffrey W. Wright 2013–2014
- Command Sergeant Major David Turnbull 2014–2018
- Command Sergeant Major Eric C. Dostie 2018–2021
- Command Sergeant Major Stephen H. Helton 2021–2024
- Command Sergeant Major Shawn F. Carns 2024-Present

== See also ==
- U.S. Army Training and Doctrine Command
- Buffalo Soldier
- Center for the Army Profession and Ethic (CAPE)
