= Warrant Officer Candidate School =

Coordinates: 31.3237°N 85.7179°W

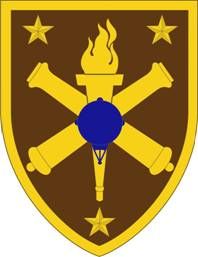
- The USAWOCC patch was created in 2008.
- Active: 1918–present
- Country: United States
- Allegiance: United States Army Transformation and Training Command
- Branch: United States Army
- Type: Training
- Role: Train and appoint U.S. Army Warrant Officers
- Part of: Army University
- Garrison/HQ: Fort Rucker, Alabama
- Motto: "Strength in Knowledge"

The United States Army's Warrant Officer Candidate School (WOCS), located at Fort Rucker, Alabama, provides training for Soldiers to become a warrant officer in the U.S. Army or U.S. Army National Guard (also conducted via state Regional Training Institutes—RTI programs), with the recent exception of U.S. Army Special Forces Warrant Officers. Since 2007, Special Forces Warrant Officers attend the Special Forces Warrant Officer Technical and Tactical Certification Course (SF-WOTTC) at Fort Bragg, North Carolina. As of January 2018, WOCS and SF-WOTTC are the only two training institutions which are authorized to appoint warrant officers in the U.S. Army. Warrant officer candidates are typically drawn from enlisted members (up to Command Sergeant Major) and inter-service transfers. In this case, Inter-Service Transfer refers to enlisted members of the U.S. Air Force, U.S. Coast Guard, U.S. Navy, or U.S. Marine Corps transferring to the U.S. Army to attend WOCS, or civilian high school graduates who enlist for guaranteed attendance as aviation (flight) candidates at WOCS after they complete Basic Combat Training (BCT). Warrant officer candidates without prior enlisted service are informally referred to as high school to flight school or street to seat recruits by warrant officer candidates with prior enlisted service.

== Overview ==
WOCS is a five-week course designed to train, assess, evaluate, and develop warrant officers for fourteen of the U.S. Army's sixteen basic branches (excluding Infantry and Armor). The course is designed to provide a base to assist in the development of Army Warrant Officers into self–aware and adaptive technical experts, combat leaders, trainers, mentors, and advisors to both soldiers and commanders. Later, through progressive levels of expertise in assignments, training, and education, Warrant Officers administer, manage, maintain, operate, and integrate Army systems and equipment across the full-spectrum of Army operations. Warrant officers in the Army are accessed with specific levels of technical ability. They refine their technical expertise and develop their leadership and management skills through tiered progressive assignments and education.

WOCS focuses on officer training and candidates serve in various student leadership positions throughout the course. The course includes classroom instruction focusing on officership, military history, problem solving, professional development, and other topics.

Graduation from WOCS is held at the United States Army Aviation Museum on Fort Rucker, where a candidate is appointed to WO1 and moves to their respective branch schools to attend the Warrant Officer Basic Course. For example, United States Army Signal Corps branched Warrant Officers attend WOBC at Fort Gordon, where Aviation branched Warrant Officers attend WOBC at Fort Rucker.

== See also ==
- Military academy
- Officer Candidate School
- Officer Candidate School (United States Army)
- Training and Doctrine Command
- Warrant Officer Career College
