= WOBC =

WOBC may refer to:

- Warrant Officer Basic Course, training for Warrant Officers in the United States Army
- WOBC-CD, a low-power television station (channel 16, virtual 14) licensed to serve Battle Creek, Michigan, United States
- WOBC-FM, a radio station (91.5 FM) licensed to serve Oberlin, Ohio, United States
