= Chief Warrant Officer of the Army =

United States Army position

- Army Staff Identification Badge

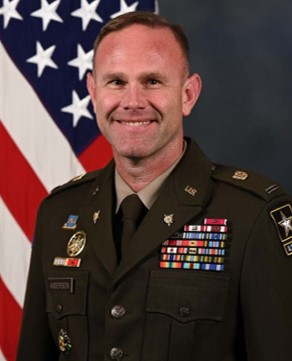
- Incumbent; Aaron H. Anderson since 12 July 2024
- Department of the Army
- Reports to: Chief of Staff of the Army
- Formation: March 2014
- First holder: David Williams

The Chief Warrant Officer of the Army (CWA) is the most senior warrant officer position in the United States Department of the Army. The CWA serves as a key advisor within the Office of the Chief of Staff of the Army and Reports to the Chief Of Staff of the Army. The role involves providing expert counsel on matters related to warrant officer management, training, education, and policies, while also supporting broader Army strategic goals.

The post was announced by CSA GEN Raymond T. Odierno on March 14, 2014, wherein CW5 David Williams was established as the first ARSTAF SWO. Since 2014, the Department of the Army has maintained a senior warrant officer position with various titles, such as Army Staff Senior Warrant Officer (ARSTAFF SWO) and Senior Warrant Officer Advisor to the Chief of Staff of the United States Army (SWOA2CSA). On July 10, 2024, this role was officially named the Chief Warrant Officer of the Army (CWA), solidifying its importance as the highest-ranking warrant officer role in the Army and an integral member of the Office of the Chief of Staff of the Army.

The Chief Warrant Officer of the Army's duties include advising principal officials on issues related to talent management, training, education, doctrine, policies, quality of life, and other Army matters, with a focus on the needs and development of warrant officers. Additionally, the CWA chairs the Army Warrant Officer Council (ARWOC) and works collaboratively with Army staff, agencies, and personnel to support and advance the Army's strategic initiatives.

Unlike the senior enlisted advisor to the chairman and the various services' senior enlisted advisors, the CWA does not wear a unique rank insignia; instead, the CWA wears the "chief warrant officer 5" (CW5) rank insignia – a single silver bar with a black line running lengthwise down the center.

CW5 and CWA insignia

== Assistant Executive Officer and Warrant Officer Advisor to the Chief of Staff, Army ==
From 2002 to 2014, the precursor office to the Chief Warrant Officer of the Army was the Assistant Executive Officer and Warrant Officer Advisor to the Chief of Staff, Army.

No.	Portrait	Name	Took Office	Left Office	Time serving	Ref.
1		CW5; Daniel J. Logan, Jr.	2002	2003		
2		CW5; Jerry L. Dillard	2003	2006		
3		CW5; Carl Jenkins	2006	2011		
4		CW5; Ronald Galloway	2011	2014		

== List of officeholders ==
No.	Portrait	Name (born–died)	Term of office			Ref.
No.	Portrait	Name (born–died)	Took office	Left office	Time serving	Ref.
Army Staff Senior Warrant Officer
1		CW5; David Williams (?–?)	March 2014	July 2016	2 years, 4 months	
2		CW5; Billy Frittz (?–?)	February 2017	April 2020	3 years, 2 months	
Senior Warrant Officer Advisor to the Chief of Staff of the United States Army
3		CW5; Yolondria Dixon-Carter (?–?)	April 2020	July 2024	4 years, 3 months	
Chief Warrant Officer of the Army
4		CW5; Aaron H. Anderson (?–?)	12 July 2024	Incumbent	2 years, 4 months	

== See also ==
- Sergeant Major of the Army
- Chief of Staff of the United States Army
