= United States Army Warrant Officer Career College =

Coordinates: 31.3274°N 85.7126°W

US Army Warrant Officer Career College
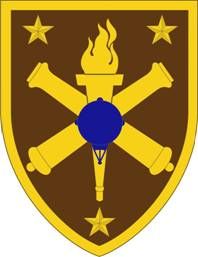
- The USAWOCC Shoulder Sleeve Insignia.
- Active: 1993–present
- Country: United States
- Branch: U.S. Army
- Role: Warrant Officer training and education
- Part of: Training and Doctrine Command and Combined Arms Center and Army University
- Garrison/HQ: Fort Rucker, Alabama
- Motto: "Strength in Knowledge"

Commanders
- Current commander: COL Kevin E. McHugh

Insignia
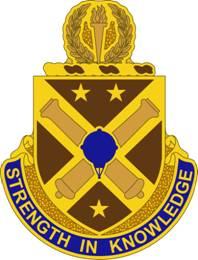
- US Army Warrant Officer Career College DUI

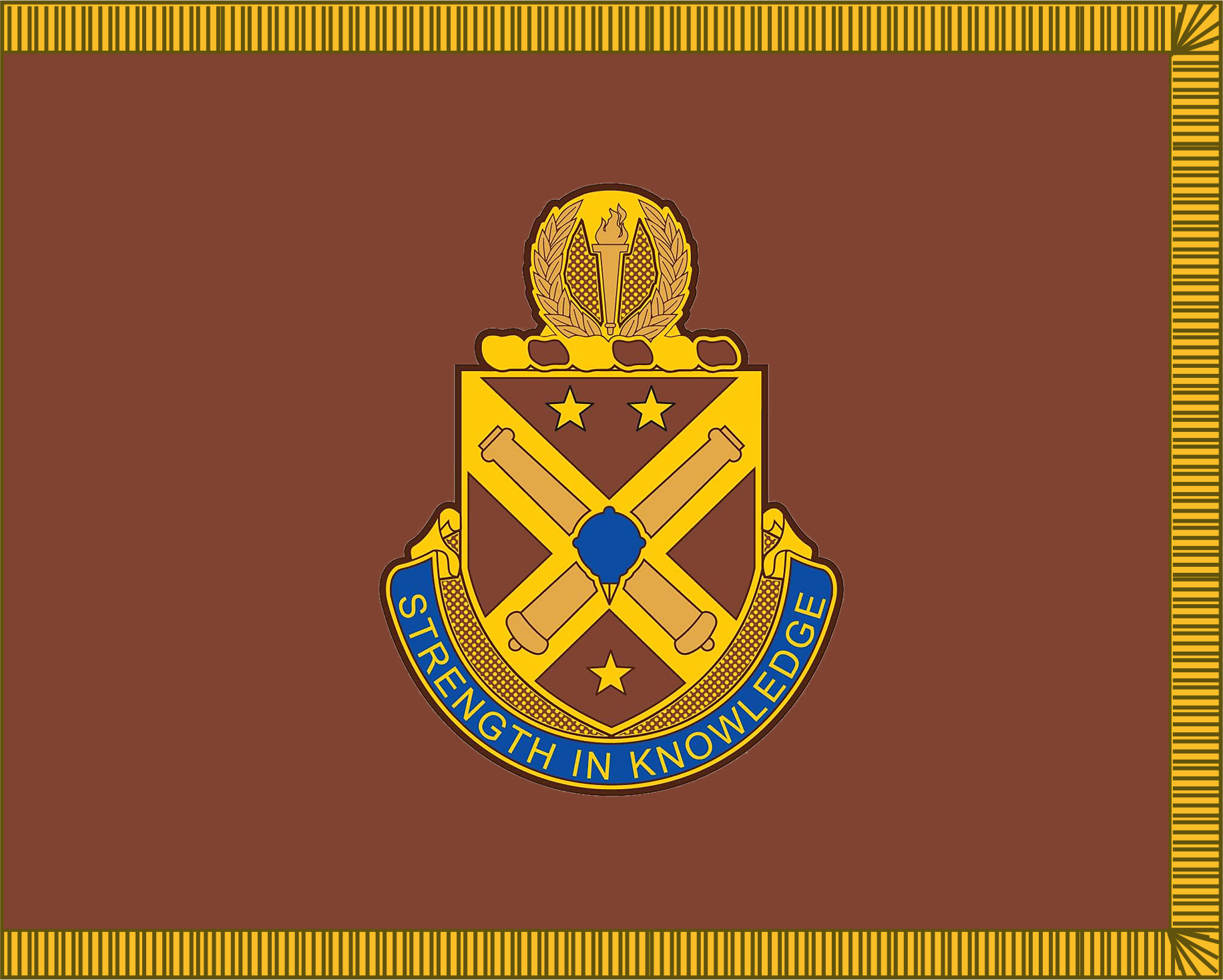
- US Army Warrant Officer Career College Flag

The United States Army's Warrant Officer Career College (USAWOCC), located at Fort Rucker, Alabama, functions as Training and Doctrine Command's executive agent for all warrant officer training and education in the U.S. Army. The Warrant Officer Career College is part of Army University, headquartered at Carlisle Barracks, Pennsylvania, and Combined Arms Command.

The Warrant Officer Career College develops and administers active and reserve component warrant officer courses to include the Warrant Officer Candidate School, Warrant Officer Basic Course, Warrant Officer Advanced Common Core Distributed Learning, Warrant Officer Intermediate Level Education, and the Warrant Officer Senior Service Education.

== See also ==
- Staff college
- United States Army War College
- United States Army Command and General Staff College
