= Warrant officer (United States) =

Ranks in the U.S. Armed Forces

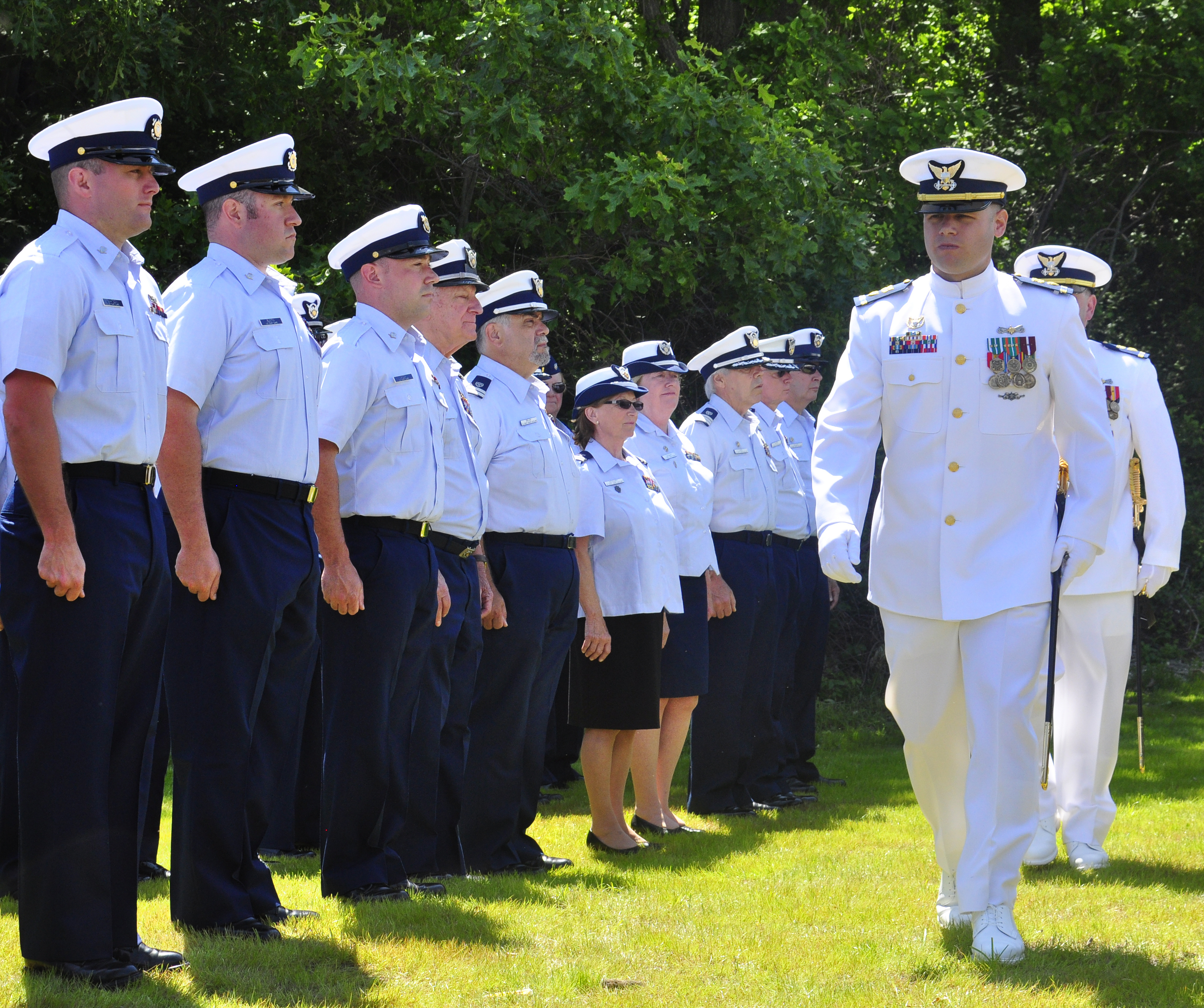
CWO3 Steve Pollock reviews his crewmates, active and auxiliary, at Coast Guard Station Eatons Neck during his change-of-command ceremony (2013)

In the United States Armed Forces, the ranks of warrant officer (grade W‑1) and commissioned chief warrant officer (grades CW-2 to CW‑5)—NATO: WO1–CWO5—are rated as officers above all non-commissioned officers, candidates, cadets, and midshipmen, but subordinate to the lowest commissioned officer grade of O‑1 (NATO: OF‑1). This application differs from the Commonwealth of Nations and other militaries, where warrant officers are the most senior of the other ranks (NATO: OR‑8 and OR‑9), equivalent to the U.S. Armed Forces senior enlisted grades of E‑8 and E‑9 (NATO: OR-8 and OR-9).

Warrant officers are highly skilled, single-track specialty officers. While the ranks are authorized by Congress, each branch of the uniformed services selects, manages, and uses warrant officers in slightly different ways. For appointment to the rank of warrant officer-one (W‑1), since 2005, by executive order a warrant of authority is approved by the department secretary (Secretary of Defense or Secretary of Homeland Security) for each respective service, using delegated presidential authority. By statute, appointment to the grade of W-1 can also come via commission by the service secretary, the department secretary, or the president, but this is effectively an extinct practice. For the chief warrant officer ranks (CW‑2 to CW‑5), these warrant officers are commissioned, since 2005, by their department Secretary using delegated presidential authority. Both warrant officers and chief warrant officers take the same oath of office as other commissioned officers (O‑1 to O‑10).

Warrant officers can and do command detachments, units, vessels, aircraft, and armored vehicles, as well as lead, coach, train, and counsel subordinates. However, the warrant officer's primary task as a leader is to serve as a technical expert.

== Rank insignia ==
Current insignia and grades of warrant officers of the U.S. military
Service	W-5	W-4	W-3	W-2	W-1
Army	U.S. Army chief warrant officer 5 rank insignia	U.S. Army chief warrant officer 4 rank insignia	U.S. Army chief warrant officer 3 rank insignia	U.S. Army chief warrant officer 2 rank insignia	U.S. Army warrant officer 1 rank insignia
Army	CW5	CW4	CW3	CW2	WO1
Air Force	U.S. Air Force chief warrant officer 5 rank insignia	U.S. Air Force chief warrant officer 4 rank insignia	U.S. Air Force chief warrant officer 3 rank insignia	U.S. Air Force chief warrant officer 2 rank insignia	U.S. Air Force warrant officer 1 rank insignia
Air Force	CW5	CW4	CW3	CW2	WO1
Marine Corps	USMC chief warrant officer 5 rank insignia	USMC chief warrant officer 4 rank insignia	USMC chief warrant officer 3 rank insignia	USMC chief warrant officer 2 rank insignia	USMC warrant officer 1 rank insignia
Marine Corps	CWO5	CWO4	CWO3	CWO2	WO
Navy	U.S. Navy chief warrant officer 5 collar insignia	U.S. Navy chief warrant officer 4 collar insignia	U.S. Navy chief warrant officer 3 collar insignia	U.S. Navy chief warrant officer 2 collar insignia	U.S. Navy warrant officer 1 collar insignia
Navy	U.S. Navy chief warrant officer 5 sleeve insignia	U.S. Navy chief warrant officer 4 sleeve insignia	U.S. Navy chief warrant officer 3 sleeve insignia	U.S. Navy chief warrant officer 2 sleeve insignia	U.S. Navy warrant officer 1 sleeve insignia
Navy	CWO5	CWO4	CWO3	CWO2	WO1
Coast Guard	Established in 1994; not implemented	U.S. Coast Guard chief warrant officer 4 collar insignia	U.S. Coast Guard chief warrant officer 3 collar insignia	U.S. Coast Guard chief warrant officer 2 collar insignia	Discontinued in 1975
Coast Guard	Established in 1994; not implemented	U.S. Coast Guard chief warrant officer 4 sleeve insignia	U.S. Coast Guard chief warrant officer 3 sleeve insignia	U.S. Coast Guard chief warrant officer 2 sleeve insignia	Discontinued in 1975
Coast Guard	Established in 1994; not implemented	CWO4	CWO3	CWO2	Discontinued in 1975
NATO Codes	WO-5	WO-4	WO-3	WO-2	WO-1

== Army ==
=== History ===
==== Early years of creation ====
U.S. Army warrant officer recruiting film (4:35)
Overview of Warrant Officer history and function within the U.S. Army

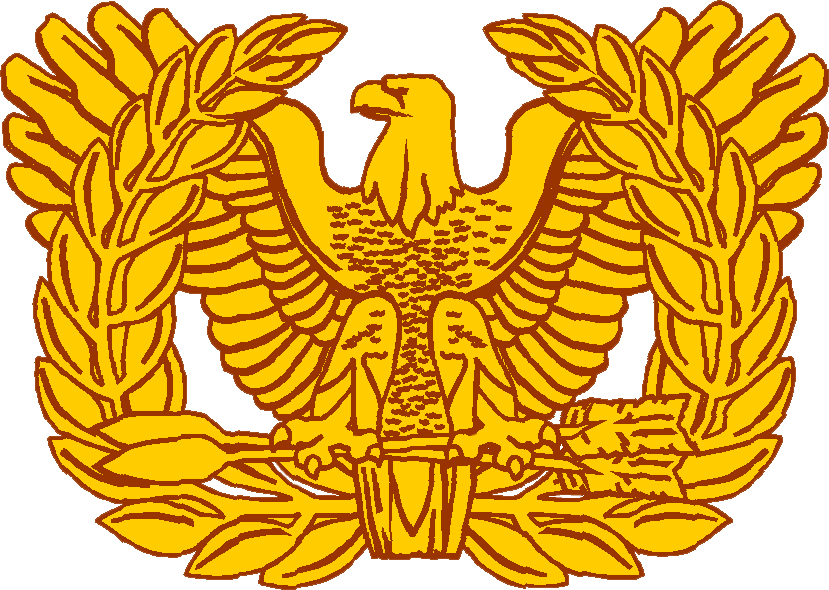
Former warrant officer branch insignia, called the "Eagle Rising". Active from 1920 to 2004, which is currently used informally to represent the warrant officer cohort.

The Army warrant officer traces lineage to 1896 with the War Department's creation of civilian headquarters clerks and pay clerks. In 1916, an Army Judge Advocate General review determined that field clerks should be members of the military. Legislation in 1916 authorized those positions as military rather than civilian and created the ranks of Army field clerk (the former rank of headquarters clerk) and Quarter Master Corps field clerk (the former rank of pay clerk). In July 1917, all Field Clerks were considered enlisted and were assigned an enlisted uniform. Their branch insignia was two crossed quill pens (worn on a disk pin on the left side of the standing collar and a firework insignia on the visored cap).

On 19 December 1917, Special Regulation 41 stated that the Army Field Clerk and Quarter Master Corps Field Clerk ranks were authorized the same uniform as an officer. Their rank insignia was now a framework pin of crossed quill pens on either side of the framework "U.S." pins worn on the standing collar of the M1909 tunic. They were not permitted the brown mohair cuff braid band of an Army officer, but were authorized a silver-and-black braid hat cord for wear with the M1911 Campaign Hat and the officer's "G.I. Eagle" on the M1902 peaked cap.

On 9 July 1918, Congress established the rank and grade of warrant officer concurrent with establishing the Army Mine Planter Service (AMPS) within the Coast Artillery Corps. Creation of the Mine Planter Service replaced an informal service crewed by civilians, replacing them with military personnel, of whom the vessel's master, mates, chief engineer, and assistant engineers were Army warrant officers. Warrant officer rank was indicated by rings of brown cord worn on the lower sleeve of the uniform jacket: two for 2nd Mate and 2nd Assistant Engineer, three for 1st Mate and Assistant Engineer, and four for Ship's Master and Chief Engineer.

==== Refinement of grading ====
Since that time, the position of warrant officer in the Army has been refined. On 21 August 1941, under Pub. L. 77–230, Congress authorized two grades: warrant officer (junior grade) and chief warrant officer. In 1942, temporary appointments in about 40 occupational areas were made. The insignia for warrant officer (junior grade) was a gold bar 3/8 inch (9.5 mm) wide and 1 inch (25 mm) long, rounded at the ends with brown enamel on top and a latitudinal center of gold 1/8 inch (3.2 mm) wide. The insignia for chief warrant officer was a gold bar 3/8 inch (9.5 mm) in width and 1 inch (25 mm) in length with rounded ends, brown enamel on top with a longitudinal center stripe of gold 1/8 inch (3.2 mm) wide. The brown enamel backing of the warrant officer insignia was based on the color of the sleeve insignia of rank for ship's officers of the AMPS.

On 18 July 1942, Pub. L. 77–658, the Flight Officer Act, was enacted, creating the rank of flight officer, equivalent to warrant officer (junior grade) and assigned to the U.S. Army Air Forces (USAAF). Insignia was the same as for a warrant officer (junior grade), except the backing was in blue enamel rather than brown. Most flight officers were graduates of various USAAF flight-training programs, including power and glider pilots, and navigator and bombardier ratings. Graduates were appointed to the rating of flight officer, but some of each graduating class were commissioned as second lieutenants. Once reaching operational units and after gaining flying experience, flight officers were later offered direct commissions as lieutenants. Flight sergeants, who were assigned as transport and glider pilots, were appointed as flight officers when the new rank was created. Some of the first eligible flight officers were Americans who had served as sergeant pilots in the Royal Air Force and who transferred to the USAAF after the U.S. entered the war.

In November 1942, the War Department defined the rank order as having warrant officers above all enlisted grades and below all commissioned grades. In March 1944, the first six women were appointed to the warrant officer grades as Band Leaders and administrative specialists. In 1947, legislation was sought to introduce four grades of warrant officers. Proposed rank titles were: chief warrant officer, senior warrant officer, warrant officer first class, and warrant officer.

In 1949, Pub. L. 81–351, the Career Compensation Act, created four pay grades, W-1 through W-4, for all the armed services. The two warrant ranks were unchanged, but warrant officer (junior grade) was pay grade W-1, while the chief warrant officer started at W-2 and could advance to W-3 and W-4. In late 1949, the Warrant Officer Flight Program was created, which trained thousands of warrant officer pilots. The personnel were to be trained by the US Air Force, but controlled by the US Army Transportation Corps. The first helicopter pilot class was 51A (April 1951 to December 1951), which was trained to fly H-19 Chickasaws. The program was temporarily cancelled in 1959 due to military budget cuts, but was reinstated in 1963 to meet the increased demand. In 1954, the Warrant Officer Act, Pub. L. 83–379, created separate ranks for each pay grade, W-1 through W-4. On 10 September 1956, AR 670-5 authorized the approved insignia for the new ranks that consisted of a metal frame around a brown enamel bar. The insignia for warrant officer 1 (Grade W-1) and chief warrant officer 2 (Grade W-2) was a gold metal frame with one or two horizontal metal bands across it. Chief warrant officer 3 and chief warrant officer 4 had a silver frame with one or two horizontal bands across it.

Due to the demand for helicopter pilots in Vietnam, the number of warrant officer pilots grew from about 2,960 in 1966 to more than 12,000 by 1970. In 1973, a reduction in force began and chief warrant officer helicopter pilots were offered promotion to the rank of first lieutenant to retain combat veterans.

On 10 June 1970, the Army adopted a redesigned warrant officer insignia that was easier to identify. It was a silver bar with one to four black enamel squares on it (one per level of rank). "In July 1972, Army Warrant Officers began wearing the newly designed silver rank insignia, with black squares ..." (Although wear of the new grade of rank insignia was not mandatory until August 1973.)

Beginning in 1986, the Army began commissioning "chief warrant officers" (CWOs) upon appointment/promotion to the grade of "chief warrant officer two" (W-2) and above. This brought Army CWOs in-line with those of the "Sea Services" (i.e., Marine Corps, Navy, and Coast Guard) who had always been "commissioned warrant officers." On 8 April 1988, the rank of master warrant officer (MW4) was created in the grade of W-4. Candidates were drawn from chief warrant officer 4s (CW4) who had attended a special course at the warrant officer school at Fort Rucker. The first class graduated on 8 December 1988. The Warrant Officer Management Act Pub. L. 102–190 of 5 December 1991 created the paygrade of W5 and the separate rank of master warrant officer (CW5), since renamed as chief warrant officer five.

On 9 July 2004, the warrant officer branch insignia (also known as the "Eagle Rising" or "Squashed Bug") was discontinued. The warrant officer's branch of assignment will now be worn instead.

Army warrant officer rank insignia
Uniformed services pay grade	W-5	W-4		W-3	W-2	W-1
1941–1947
1941–1947					Chief warrant officer	Warrant officer junior grade	Flight officer
1947–1956
1947–1956					Chief warrant officer	Warrant officer junior grade
1956–1972
1956–1972		Chief warrant officer 4		Chief warrant officer 3	Chief warrant officer 2	Warrant officer 1
1972–1987
1972–1987		Chief warrant officer 4		Chief warrant officer 3	Chief warrant officer 2	Warrant officer 1
1987–1991
1987–1991		Master warrant officer 4	Chief warrant officer 4	Chief warrant officer 3	Chief warrant officer 2	Warrant officer 1
1991–2004
1991–2004	Chief warrant officer 5	Chief warrant officer 4		Chief warrant officer 3	Chief warrant officer 2	Warrant officer 1
2004–present
2004–present	Chief warrant officer 5	Chief warrant officer 4		Chief warrant officer 3	Chief warrant officer 2	Warrant officer 1

=== Mission and use ===
Army warrant officers are technical experts, combat leaders, trainers, and advisors. They serve in 17 branches and 67 warrant officer specialties, spanning the Active Component (i.e., Regular Army), the Army National Guard, and the U.S. Army Reserve. Warrant officers command the Army's waterborne and seagoing vessels, most Army bands, and as aircraft commanders of most Army Aviation aircraft. In addition, they may be found in command of various small units and detached teams.

U.S. Army branches with warrant officer billets
Adjutant General's Corps	Air Defense Artillery	Aviation
Chemical Corps	Cyber Corps	Corps of Engineers
Field Artillery	Judge Advocate General's Corps	Military Intelligence Corps
Medical Service Corps	Military Police Corps	Ordnance Corps
Quartermaster Corps	Signal Corps	Special Forces
Transportation Corps	Veterinary Corps	

The Army uses warrant officers to serve in specific positions. Army warrant officers are officially addressed as Mr. or Ms./Mrs. and warrant officers of grades CW2-CW5 can also be referred to as "Chief".

=== Training ===
The body of warrant officers in the Army is composed of two communities: technicians and aviators. Technicians typically must be sergeants (E-5, NATO: OR-5) or above in a related specialty to qualify to become a warrant officer. A waiver may be granted on a case-by-case basis if the applicant has comparable experience in the government service or the civilian sector. The aviation field is open to all applicants, military or civilian, who meet the stringent medical and aptitude requirements. The aviation warrant officer route does not require a bachelor's degree like other branches; known as the "Street to Seat" program, high school graduates or those actively serving that have a high school diploma may apply if they meet all other requirements. They are able to undergo Warrant Officer Candidate School (WOCS) and then proceed to aviation training at Fort Rucker, Alabama, to commit ten years of military service as a U.S. Army aviator.

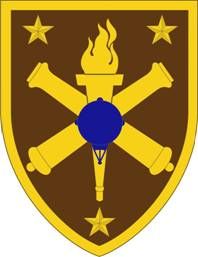
Warrant Officer Career College Shoulder Sleeve Insignia

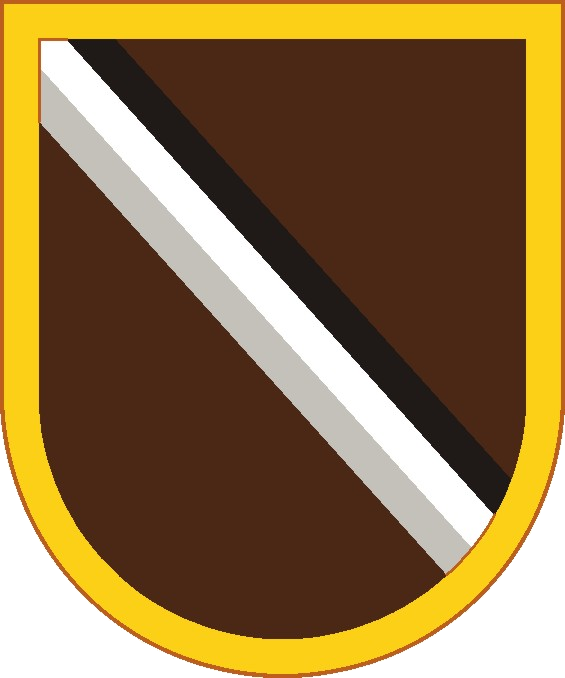
JFK Special Warfare Center and School, Special Forces Warrant Officer Institute Beret Flash

After selection to the warrant officer program, candidates attend WOCS, which is developed and administered by the Warrant Officer Career College (USAWOCC) at Fort Rucker. Army candidates on active duty must attend the course at Fort Rucker. Candidates in the United States National Guard attend the course either at Fort Rucker or one of the National Guard's Regional Training Institutes. After graduation, all candidates are promoted to warrant officers (WO1). Technicians attend training at their respective branch's Warrant Officer Basic Course (WOBC) before moving on to their assignments in the Army. Aviation-branched warrant officers remain at Fort Novosel to complete flight training and the aviation WOBC.

Special Forces warrant officer candidates from both the active and national guard components attend the Special Forces Warrant Officer Technical and Tactical Certification Course (SFWOTTC) at the Special Forces Warrant Officer Institute, John F. Kennedy Special Warfare Center and School, Fort Bragg, North Carolina. The course includes both WOCS and WOBC, tailored to the experience of the Special Forces Sergeant. Candidates must be a staff sergeant (E-6, NATO: OR-6) and above, and have served three years on an operational detachment.

In 2008, the Army tested limited training of warrant officers at the United States Army Command and General Staff College at Fort Leavenworth, a course normally reserved exclusively for majors. The CGSC Class of 2009 included five warrant officers, and the Class of 2010 included nine warrant officers. Three 2010 graduates continued on to higher-level training at the School of Advanced Military Studies (SAMS) in 2011.

=== Ranks ===
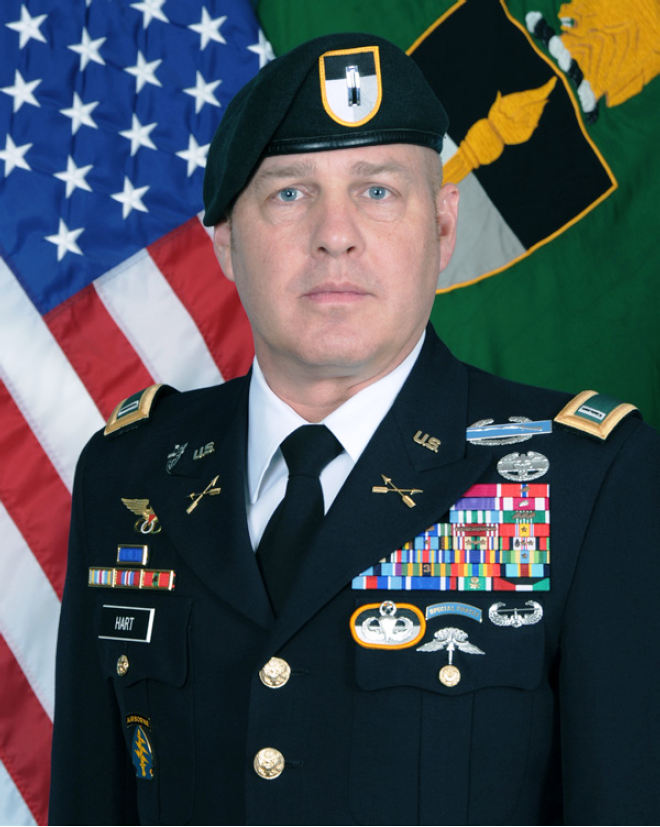
CW5 Robert Hart, Command Chief Warrant Officer, U.S. Army JFK Special Warfare Center and School (c. 2018)

The Army warrant officer (Note: Warrant officer definitions per Army Pamphlet DA PAM 600-3 Commissioned Officer Professional Development and Career Management, paragraph 3–9, 3 December 2014.) administers, manages, and operates Army systems and equipment of Army operations. The following are specific characteristics and responsibilities of the separate, successive warrant officer grades:

- A warrant officer one (WO1): Appointed by warrant with the requisite authority pursuant to assignment level and position given by the Secretary of the Army. CW2s and above are commissioned officers with the requisite authority pursuant to assignment level and position as given by the President of the United States. WO1's and CW2's primary focus is working on the enlisted rank's military occupational specialty (MOS). Warrant officers are classified by warrant officer military occupational specialty, or WOMOS.
- Chief warrant officer three (CW3): perform the primary duties of trainer, operator, manager, maintainer, integrator, and advisor. They also perform any other branch-related duties assigned to them. Chief warrant officer four also perform the duties of the CW3.
- Chief warrant officer five (CW5): perform the primary duties and serve at brigade and higher levels. They also serve as Command Chief Warrant Officers (CCWO) for large commands at the brigade level and higher. On March 14, 2014, the Chief of Staff of the Army established the Chief Warrant Officer of the Army position. In November 2004 the U.S. Army Reserve had already created a Command Chief Warrant Officer position.

Chief warrant officer six was approved by the Army Chief of Staff in 1970 with the anticipation of Congress approving two new grades, W-5 and W-6. However, Congress did not authorize W-5 until 1991 and has still not approved W-6. The original W-5 insignia consisted of a single silver bar superimposed with four equally spaced silver squares with each square bordered in black. In 2004, this insignia was changed to a single silver bar surmounted by a single, narrow, vertical, black stripe, in harmony with the Navy and Marine Corps. The proposed CW6 insignia had two narrow, vertical, parallel, black stripes.

== Marine Corps ==
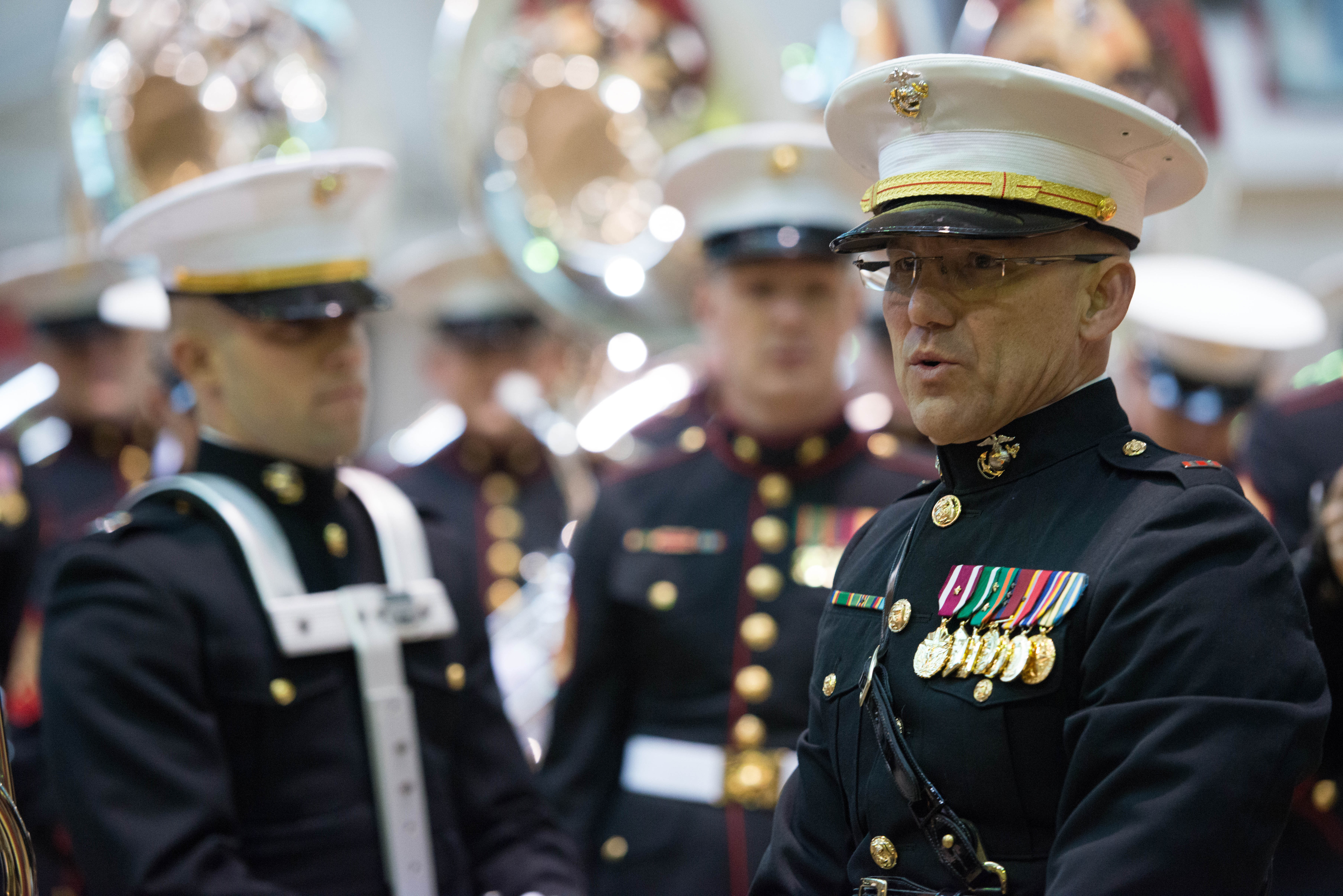
Director CWO4 Szabo of East Coast Marine Corps Composite Band speaks with musicians during rehearsal (2013)

=== History ===
The Marine Corps has had warranted officers since 1916, when the Commandant of the Marine Corps made a request to the Secretary of the Navy for the creation of two warrant grades, Marine gunner and quartermaster clerk. Those appointed would be selected from the non-commissioned officer ranks. On 26 August 1916, Congress increased the Marine Corps strength, which included adding the rank of warrant officer; 43 marine gunners and 41 quartermaster clerks would be appointed. The first marine gunners were Sergeant Major John Francis Burnes and Sergeant Major Henry L. Hulbert. On 22 May 1917, due to commissioned officer shortages, all but three of the appointees were commissioned as temporary second lieutenants. In 1918, the grade of pay clerk was added.

In June 1926, Congress created the commissioned warrant grades of chief marine gunner, chief quartermaster clerk, and chief pay clerk. Requirements for promotion to chief warrant officers were six years of service as a warrant officer and an examination to qualify. During World War II, Congress abolished the titles of marine gunner, chief marine gunner, quartermaster clerk, chief quartermaster clerk, pay clerk, and chief pay clerk. Instead, they would be designated warrant officers or commissioned warrant officers. In 1943, all Marine warrant officer ranks were aligned with the other services. They were warrant officers and commissioned warrant officers.

In 1949, the grade of WO (paygrade W-1) was created for warrant officers and CWO-2, CWO-3, and CWO-4 (paygrades W-2, W-3, and W-4) were created for commissioned warrant officers. In 1954, the title "chief warrant officer" replaced "commissioned warrant officer" for those in grades CWO-2, CWO-3 and CWO-4. On 1 February 1992, the grade of CWO-5 (paygrade W-5) was created, and those who are appointed serve on the highest unit echelon levels. An appointment to W-5 has been written to be limited to only 5 percent of the warrant officers of that armed force on active duty.

Marine Corps warrant officer rank insignia
Uniformed services pay grade	W-5	W-4	W-3	W-2	W-1
1926–1943					(Branch insignia only)
1926–1943				Chief warrant officer	Warrant officer
1943–1949
1943–1949				Commissioned warrant officer	Warrant officer
1949–1954
1949–1954		Commissioned warrant officer 4	Commissioned warrant officer 3	Commissioned warrant officer 2	Warrant officer 1
1954–1992
1954–1992		Chief warrant officer 4	Chief warrant officer 3	Chief warrant officer 2	Warrant officer 1
1992–present
1992–present	Chief warrant officer 5	Chief warrant officer 4	Chief warrant officer 3	Chief warrant officer 2	Warrant officer 1

=== Current requirements and duties ===
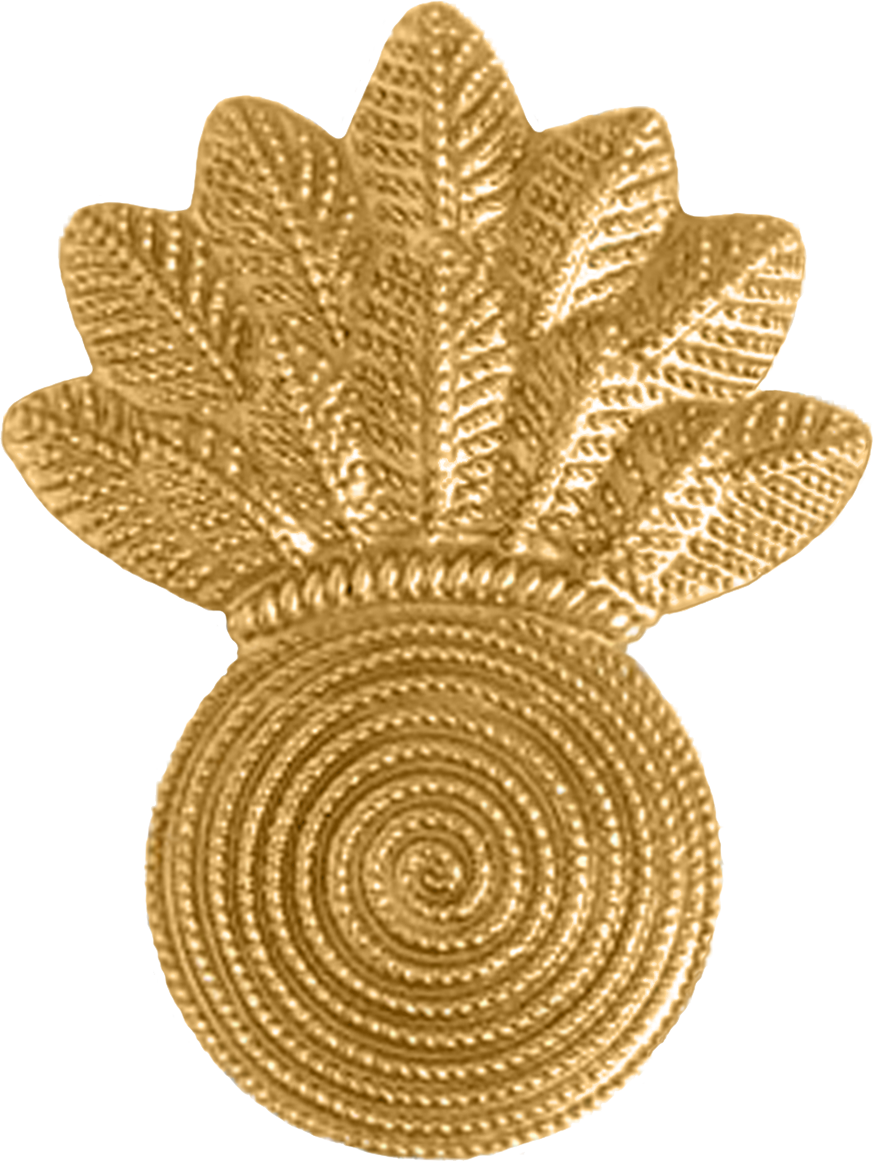
Marine Corps infantry weapons officer insignia

The present role of a chief warrant officer in the United States Marine Corps is to fulfill the responsibilities as a high-rank "subject matter expert" within their chosen military occupation specialty, with the additional authority of a commissioned officer. The chief warrant officers commonly provide their respective Marine units and sections.

Currently, there are three selection program distinctions, with each having its own separate qualifications: infantry weapons officer, recruiting officer, and regular warrant officer. Both active-duty and reserve enlisted (non-commissioned officers) are accepted into the regular program, but infantry weapons officers—commonly known as Marine Gunners—and recruiting officers are only selected from the active-duty component. The regular Warrant Officer Selection Program requires a minimum of eight years of enlistment upon date of appointment (not commissioned), proof and/or demonstration of their 'exceedingly technical proficiency' within their MOS field, and achieved the rank and pay grade of sergeant (E-5) or above. The recruiting officer selection requires a minimum time in service requirement of 8 years, a minimum grade of staff sergeant (E-6), and hold the MOS 8412, Career Recruiter, as well as have served a successful recruiting tour as an 8412. Staff sergeants will be appointed to the rank of WO, while gunnery sergeants (or higher) may be commissioned as CWO2, based on the needs of the Marine Corps each year.

However, an infantry weapons officer currently requires a minimum of 8 years time in service, holds at minimum the grade of gunnery sergeant (E-7) with at least one year time in grade, and is assigned to infantry staff noncommissioned officer MOSs 0321, 0363, 0369, or 0372. Gunners are commissioned as a chief warrant officer-2 directly from their enlisted grade, and wear the bursting bomb on their left collar.

When Marines are selected for the program, they are given additional leadership and management training during the Warrant Officer Basic Course (WOBC), conducted at The Basic School in Quantico, Virginia.

== Navy ==
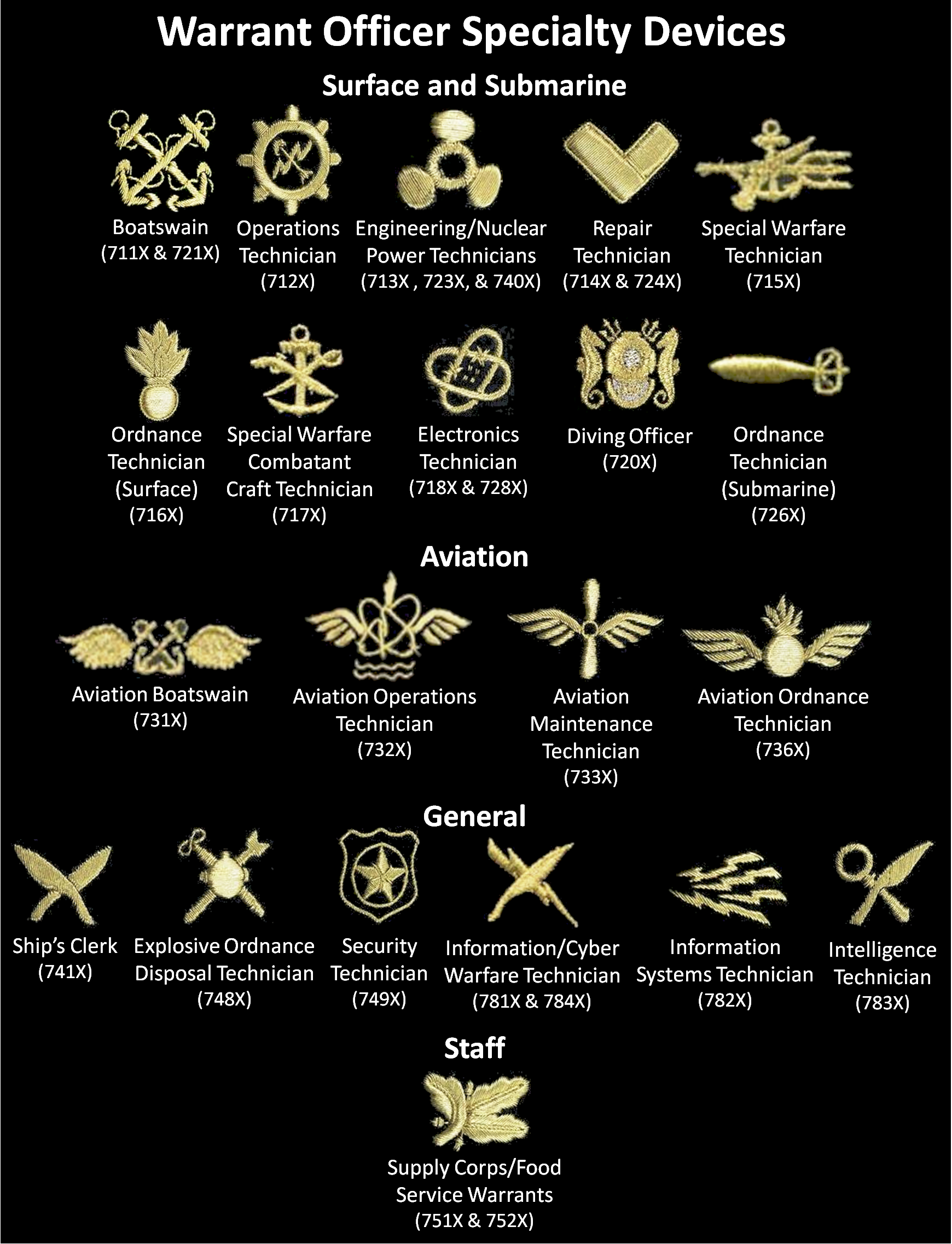

In the United States Navy, the warrant and chief warrant officer ranks are held by technical specialists who direct specific activities related to the operation of the ship, which also require commissioned officer authority. Navy warrant officers serve in 30 specialties covering five categories. Warrant officers perform duties that are directly related to their previous enlisted service and specialized training. With the exception of the Navy's short-lived flying chief warrant officer program, all Navy warrant officers are accessed from the chief petty officer pay grades, E-7 through E-9, and must have a minimum of 14 years of service.

=== Background ===
Navy warrant collar insignias (1951–1954)
Left: Commissioned Warrant Officer
Right: Warrant Officer

The Navy has had warrant officers among its ranks since 23 December 1775, when John Berriman received a warrant to act as purser aboard the brigantine, USS Andrew Doria. That warrant was considered a patent of trust and honor, but was not considered a commission to command. Since this first appointment, Navy warrant officers have held positions as masters, masters' mates, boatswains, gunners, carpenters, surgeons, and chaplains. Until 1912, a midshipman graduating from the United States Naval Academy was required to have two years of sea duty as a warrant officer before receiving a commission as an ensign.

Although based on the British Royal Navy warrant officer ranks that were in place until 1949, the United States had never needed to address an issue of social class, which resulted in warranted officers in the Royal Navy. However, the United States Navy experienced a similar issue of rank, where senior non-commissioned officers are required to report to junior officers, giving rise to special status to the Navy's chief warrant officers.

In 1995, the Navy ceased using the rank of warrant officer 1 (WO-1), also known as pay grade W-1, but resumed appointments to WO1 in 2019. The Navy appoints chief warrant officers directly to the rank of CWO2, and they are "commissioned" officers, with the Navy Personnel Command/Bureau of Personnel (NAVPERSCOM/BUPERS) managing all grades (WO1 through CWO5) by billets appropriate for each rank. In the distant past, some CWOs resigned their warrant commission prior to retirement to receive greater retirement pay at their former senior enlisted rank.

==== Flying chief warrant officer ====
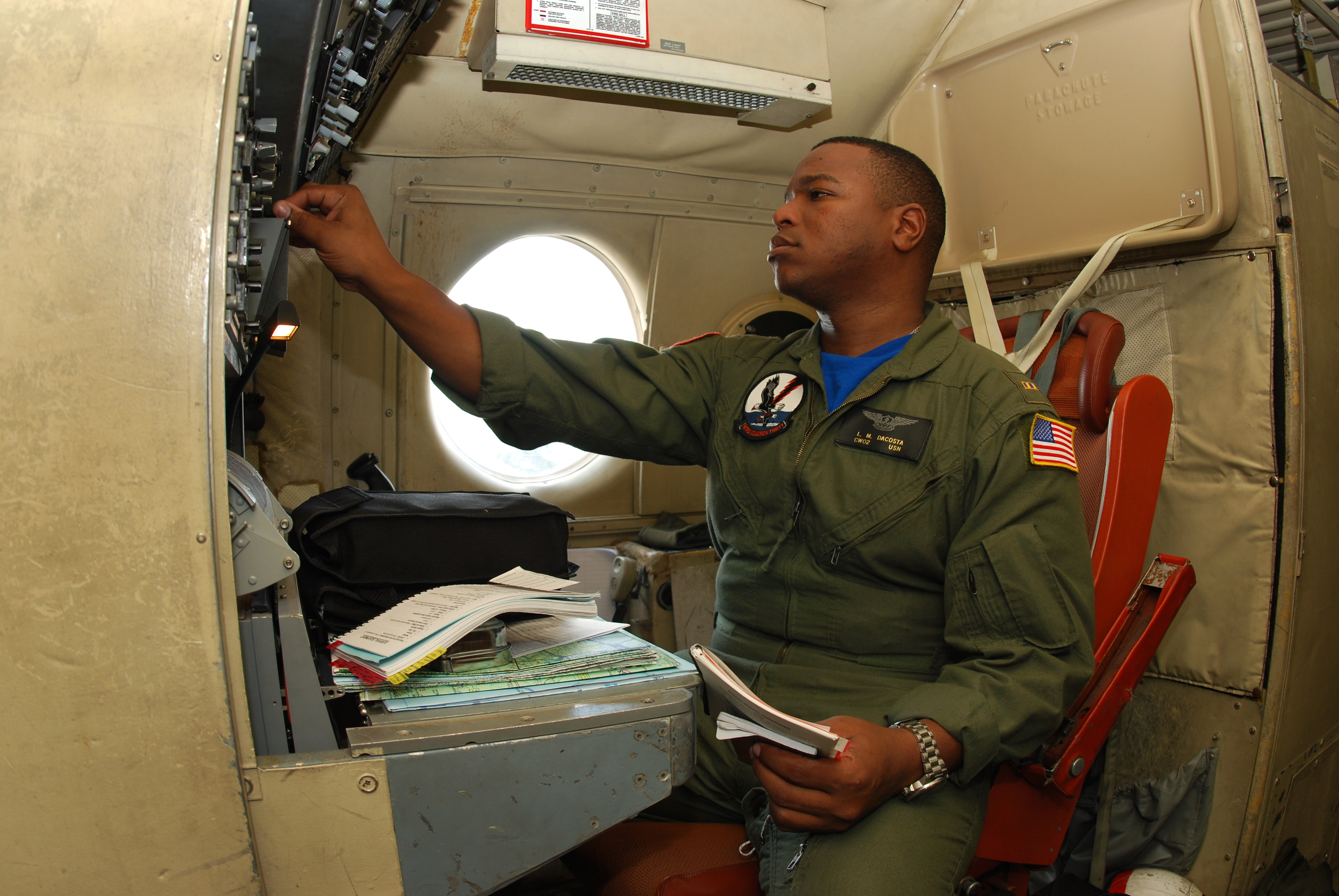
CWO2 DaCosta performs pre-flight setup on a P-3 Orion during the platform phase of the Chief Warrant Officer Flight Training Program (2009)

The Navy started a Flying Chief Warrant Officer Program in 2006 to acquire additional naval aviators (pilots) and naval flight officers (NFOs), who would fly naval aircraft, but who would not compete with traditional unrestricted line (URL) officers in naval aviation for eventual command of squadrons, air wings, air stations, etc., the numbers of such commands which had been greatly reduced in the post-Cold War era, thereby limiting the command opportunity for URL pilots and NFOs.

Upon being commissioned as CWO2, selectees underwent warrant officer indoctrination and then flight school for 18 to 30 months. After completion of flight school, selectees were placed in one of four types of squadrons: ship-based Helicopter Maritime Strike (HSM) or Helicopter Sea Combat (HSC) squadrons, and land-based fixed-wing maritime patrol and reconnaissance (VP) and fleet air reconnaissance (VQ). These pilots and NFOs were then trained to operate the P-3 Orion, the EP-3E Aries II, the E-6 Mercury, or variants of the MH-60 Seahawk. Those in the VP community would also eventually qualify to fly the P-8 Poseidon once that aircraft began replacing the P-3 in 2012. The Navy re-evaluated the program in 2011, when the last of the "flying" chief warrant officers reported to their operational fleet squadrons and opted to subsequently terminate the program. Enlisted sailors in the grades E-5 through E-7 who had at least an associate degree and were not currently serving in the diver, master-at-arms, nuclear, SEAL, SWCC, or EOD communities were eligible to apply.

=== Reestablishment of warrant officer one ===
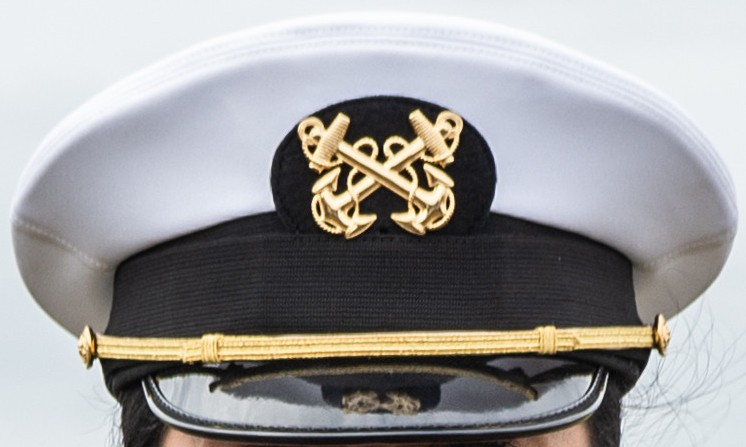
Unique combination cover worn by U.S. Navy warrant officer ones

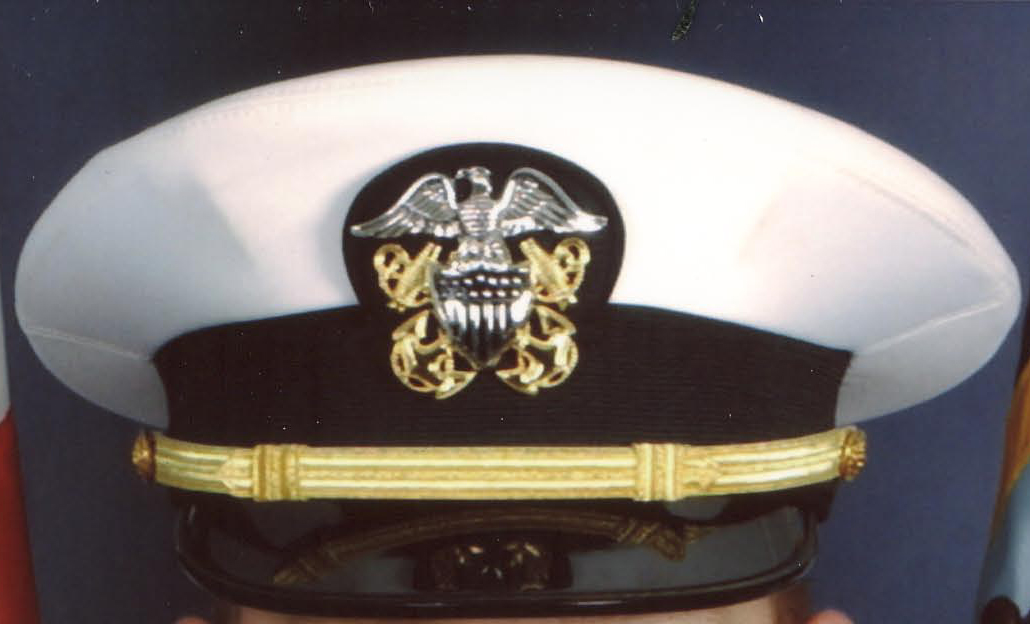
Combination cover worn by U.S. Navy chief warrant officers and junior officer

On 4 June 2018, the chief of naval operations announced the reestablishment of the rank of warrant officer one (pay grade W-1), for cyber warrant officers, and solicited applications for the rank/grade. These warrant officers will receive their appointment via warrant and not via commission. They will incur a six-year service obligation once promoted to W-1. A minimum of three-years in grade with a total service time of 12 years must be achieved before appointment and commission to chief warrant officer (W-2). However, the president also may grant appointments of warrant officers in the grade of W-1 via commission at any time, and the secretary of the Navy may also appoint warrant officers in that grade via commission, through additional regulations. In mid-December 2018, the Navy announced that six selectees had been named. They will wear a distinctive cap badge with two crossed anchors.

== Air Force ==
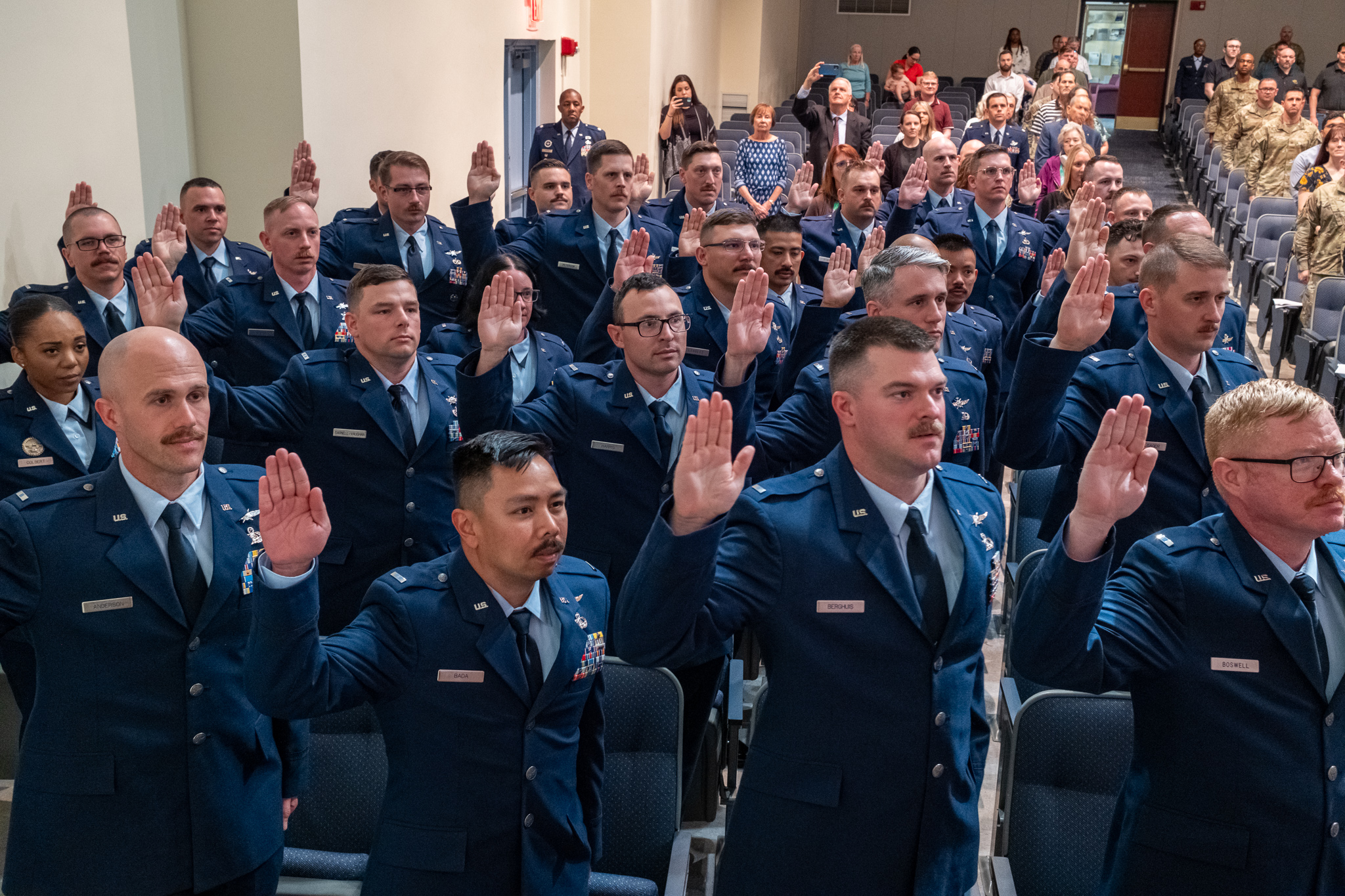
WOC Class 25-02—the second group of warrant officers to join the USAF in 66 years—take the oath of commission.

The USAF inherited 1,200 warrant officers from the Army at its inception in 1947, but their place in the Air Force structure was never made clear. In 1953, the Air Force tried to clarify the duties of USAF warrants in AFR 36-72 and they were to be "superintendents" and technical specialists. The USAF treated warrants like additional enlisted grades and they would be the supervisors of the enlisted force. When Congress authorized the creation of two new senior enlisted ranks in each of the five services in 1958 (implementing them in 1959–1960), Air Force officials privately concluded that these two new "super grades" of senior master sergeant and chief master sergeant (styling the incumbents as "superintendents" vice senior or staff NCOICs as does the USA and USMC) could fill all Air Force needs then performed at the warrant officer level. This was not publicly acknowledged until years later. USAF Vice Chief of Staff Gen. Curtis LeMay put together a committee and their recommendation was to discontinue warrant officers. The Air Force stopped appointing warrant officers in 1959.

The last active-duty Air Force chief warrant officer, CWO4 James H. Long, retired in 1980. The last Air Force Reserve chief warrant officer, CWO4 Bob Barrow, retired in 1992. Upon his retirement, Barrow was honorarily promoted to CWO5, the only person in the Air Force ever to hold this grade until 2026.

On February 12, 2024, the Air Force announced that they would bring back warrant officers after more than 30 years of hiatus. As the service evaluates the outcomes of the program, these ranks will initially be limited to Airmen in the information technology and cyber career fields. The Air Force initially wanted a class of 30 warrant officers that would begin training by the summer of 2024. By the end of July 2024, 78 Airmen were selected to be among the first Air Force warrant officers in over 66 years, more than double the original estimate. The 78 Airmen were spread out across three training classes, with the first in October 2024. Per Defense Logistics Agency documents MIL-DTL-14639/69 and MIL-DTL-14639/53E, the new 2024 warrant officer insignia will follow the Army pattern, but will have oriental blue enamel in lieu of black.

The Warrant Officer Training School (WOTS) was formally activated at Maxwell AFB, Alabama, on June 28, 2024; as an 8-week course under the Holm Center to train Active Duty, Guard, and Reserve. The Department of the Air Force opened the initial application window April 25–May 31, 2024 and established two warrant officer specialties: 17W – Warfighter Communications & IT Systems Operations and 17Y – Cyber Effects & Warfare Operations.

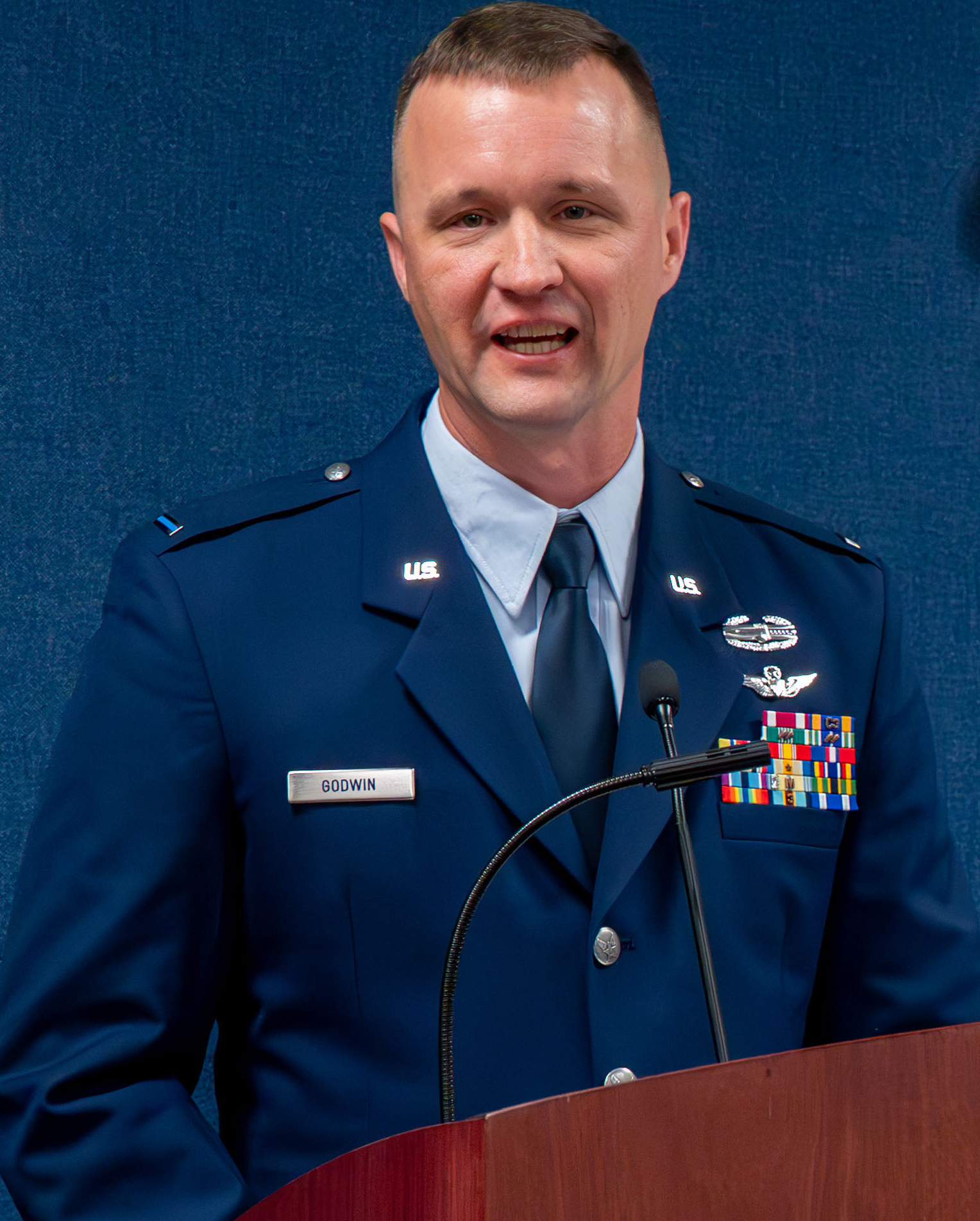
CWO5 Jason Godwin

The inaugural class graduated 30 warrant officers at Maxwell AFB on December 6, 2024. Public releases recorded a class composition of 22 Active Duty, six Air National Guard, and two Air Force Reserve graduates. These are the first warrant officers to serve in the U.S. Air Force since 1992. The warrant officer candidates graduated as either Warrant Officer 1 or Chief Warrant Officer 2. A second class graduated on March 13, 2025, bringing the total number of Air Force warrant officers to 60.

On September 9, 2025, the Department of the Air Force hosted its first Warrant Officer Summit at Maxwell AFB, bringing together graduates from all FY25 WOTS classes and the ongoing Class 26-01 (ANG) for mentorship and professional development.

On February 4, 2026, the Air Force promoted its first active duty Chief Warrant Officer 5. U.S. Army CW4 Jason Godwin became both the Warrant Officer Training School (WOTS) advisor to the commandant and transferred to the Air Force. During his service transfer ceremony, he was promoted to CW5.

Air Force warrant officer rank insignia
Uniformed services pay grade	W-5	W-4	W-3	W-2	W-1
1947–1956
1947–1956				Chief warrant officer	Warrant officer junior grade	Flight officer
1956–1991
1956–1991		Chief warrant officer 4	Chief warrant officer 3	Chief warrant officer 2	Warrant officer 1
1991–1992
1991–1992	Chief warrant officer 5	Chief warrant officer 4	Chief warrant officer 3	Chief warrant officer 2	Warrant officer 1
2024–present
2024–present	Chief warrant officer 5	Chief warrant officer 4	Chief warrant officer 3	Chief warrant officer 2	Warrant officer 1

== Coast Guard ==
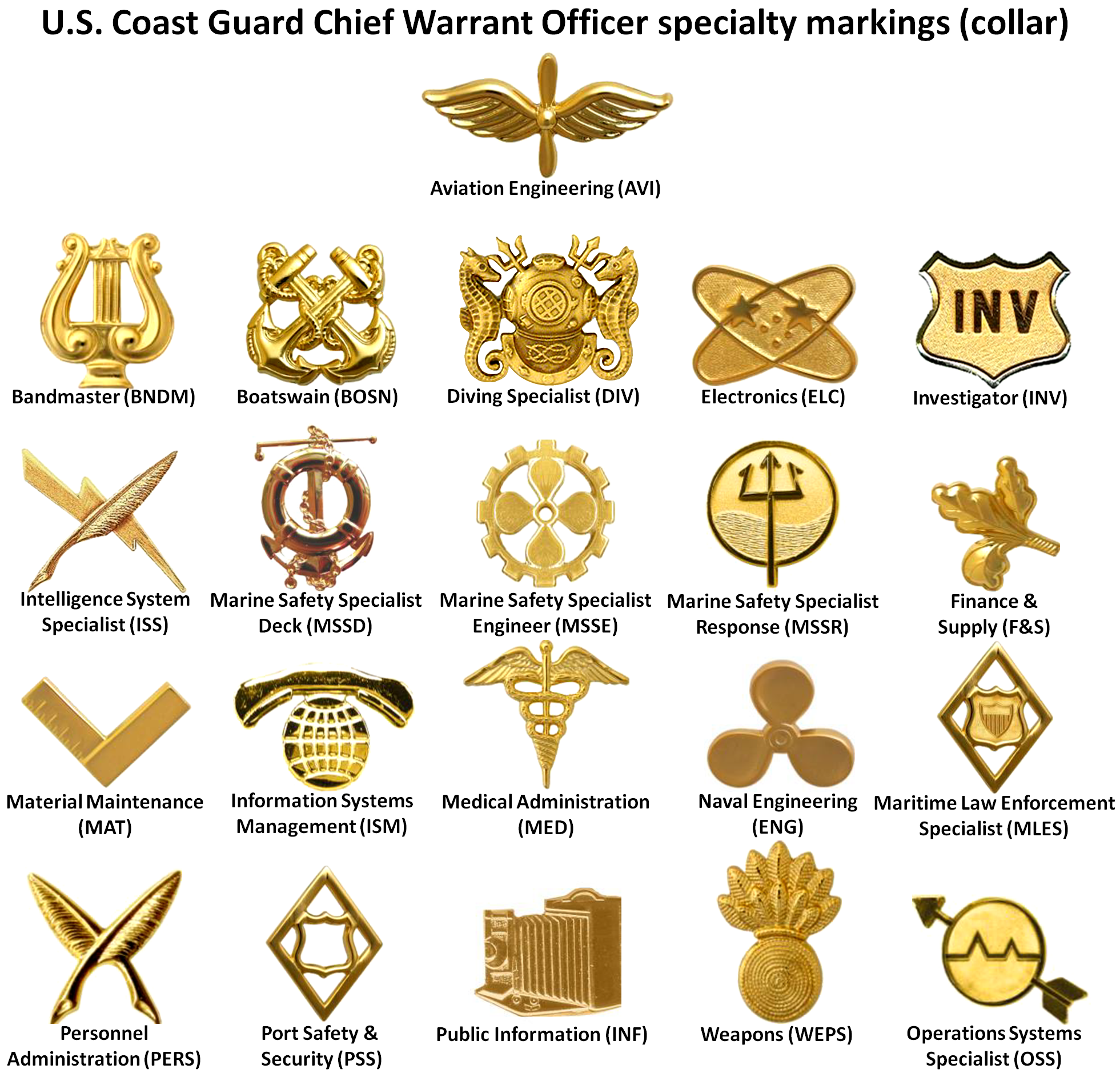

Due to the small size and decentralized organizational structure of the Coast Guard, commissioned warrant officers often fill command roles. Warrant officers frequently serve as commanding officers of Coast Guard stations and patrol boats but also fill a variety of billets as specialists and supervisors in other technical areas, and serve as special agents in the Coast Guard Investigative Service. They wear insignia essentially like that of their Navy counterparts, but with the USCG shield between the rank insignia and the specialty mark, as Coast Guard commissioned officers do with their rank insignia. Like their Navy counterparts, candidates for the rank of chief warrant officer must typically be serving in the chief petty officer grades (E-7 through E-9); however, the Coast Guard also permits selection of first class petty officers (E-6) who are chief petty officer selectees and who are in the top 50% on their advancement list to E-7. The Coast Guard does not use the rank of warrant officer (WO-1). Although authorized in 1994, the Coast Guard has not promoted any of its warrant officers to CWO5.

Coast Guard warrant officer rank insignia
Uniformed services pay grade	W-5	W-4	W-3	W-2	W-1
U.S. Coast Guard (–1975)
U.S. Coast Guard (–1975)		Chief warrant officer 4	Chief warrant officer 3	Chief warrant officer 2	Warrant officer 1
U.S. Coast Guard (1975–present)
U.S. Coast Guard (1975–present)		Chief warrant officer 4	Chief warrant officer 3	Chief warrant officer 2

== Public Health Service Commissioned Corps ==
42 U.S.C. § 204, 42 U.S.C. § 207 and 42 U.S.C. § 209 establish the use of warrant officers (W-1 to W-4) with specific specialties to the Public Health Service Commissioned Corps for the purpose of providing support to the health and delivery systems maintained by the service; however, the grades have never been used in Public Health Service history to date.

== United States Maritime Service ==
The U.S. Maritime Service (USMS), established at 46 U.S. Code § 51701, falls under the authority of the Maritime Administration of the U.S. Department of Transportation and is authorized to appoint warrant officers, although none have been so appointed. In accordance with the law, the USMS rank structure must be the same as that of the U.S. Coast Guard, while uniforms worn are those of the U.S. Navy, with distinctive USMS insignia and devices.

== Notable warrant officers ==
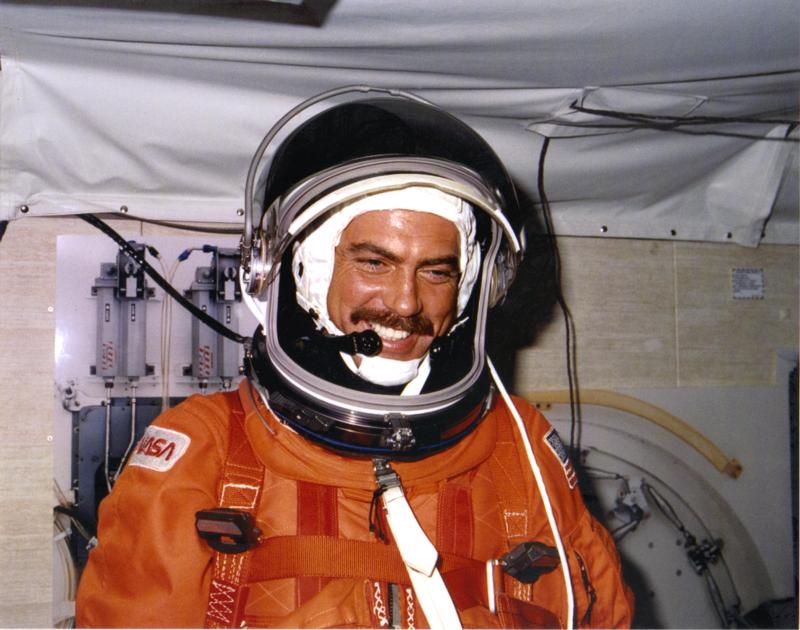
CW4 Hennen ready to board Space Shuttle Atlantis for STS-44 (1991)

- CWO2/Chief Carpenter John Arnold Austin, USN
- FO Gene Autry, USAAF (Equivalent of WO1). (flew C-109 in C-B-I, TV and Radio star)
- WO1 Floyd Bennett, USN (Medal of Honor)
- FO Jackie Coogan, USAAF (Equivalent of WO1) (Distinguished Flying Cross) (Glider Pilot in C-B-I, TV and Movie Star)
- CW5 David F. Cooper, USA (Distinguished Service Cross)
- CW4 Michael Durant, USA (Black Hawk Down)
- MAJ (was CW3) Frederick Edgar Ferguson, USA (Medal of Honor)
- CWO4 John W. Frederick, Jr., USMC (Navy Cross)
- James W. Hall, III, USA (convicted of espionage and stripped of rank)
- CW4 Thomas J. Hennen, USA (astronaut)
- WO1 Olive Hoskins, USA (the first female warrant officer)
- WO1 Amori Colbert, USAF (the first USAF female warrant officer)
- CW4 Oscar G. Johnson, USA (Medal of Honor)
- WO1 John W. Lang, USN (Navy Cross)
- WO1 Robert Mason, USA (best-selling author)
- CW2 Jason W. Myers, USA (Distinguished Service Cross)
- CW4 Michael J. Novosel, USA (Medal of Honor)
- CW5 Ralph E. Rigby, USA (last continuously serving draftee on active duty in the U.S. Army, retired in 2014)
- CW2 Louis R. Rocco, USA (Medal of Honor)
- Captain (was WO Machinist) Donald K. Ross, USN, awarded the first Medal of Honor of World War II
- MAJ (was WO1) Hugh Thompson, Jr., USA (Soldier's Medal recipient)
- CW4 Brad R. Torgersen, USAR, multi-award-winning science fiction author
- WO1 Gore Vidal, USA
- John Anthony Walker, Jr., USN (convicted of espionage and stripped of rank)
- CWO4 Henry Wildfang, USMC (Gray Eagle Award recipient for longest-serving naval aviator; only chief warrant officer in the history of U.S. Naval Aviation to receive this honor)
- CWO4 Hershel W. Williams, USMC (Medal of Honor)
- Brig Gen Chuck Yeager, USAF (World War II USAAF flight officer, equivalent to WO-1)
- CW4 Keith Yoakum, USA (Distinguished Service Cross)
- CW3 Ronald D. Young Jr., USA (POW, game show contestant)
- CWO5 Bobby Frank "Mister" Barrow, USAFR (the last warrant officer to serve within the Department of the Air Force until 2025)
- CW3 Joseph “Ben” Bailey, USA (first warrant officer selected as NASA astronaut candidate and second warrant officer to become an astronaut)
- CW5 Eric Slover, USA (Medal of Honor)

== See also ==
- Aviation Cadet Training Program (USAAF)
- List of comparative military ranks
- Ranks and insignia of NATO armies officers
- List of United States Navy ratings
- List of United States Coast Guard ratings
- Chief Warrant Officer of the Army
