= Center for Army Lessons Learned =

US Army analysis office

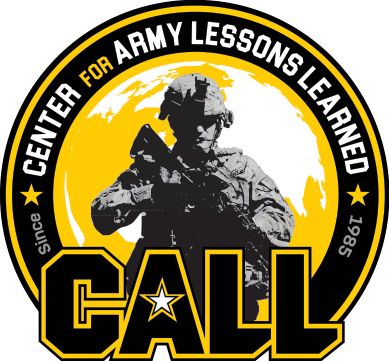
- Center for Army Lessons Learned logo
- Active: 1985 – present
- Country: United States
- Branch: United States Army
- Garrison/HQ: Fort Leavenworth, Kansas

The Center for Army Lessons Learned (CALL) continuously identifies, collects, analyzes, disseminates, and archives lessons learned and best practices while maintaining global situational awareness in order to share knowledge and facilitate the U.S. Army's and partners' adaptation to win wars. CALL is a multi-media based operation that disseminates these lessons and other related materials through a variety of print and electronic media.

== History ==
After the Army’s experience in Operation Urgent Fury, the Chief of Staff of the Army, General John A. Wickham Jr., tasked the Army Studies Group to conduct an analysis of the Army’s ability to adapt forces to local conditions in combat. On June 15, 1984 the Army Studies Group, headed by Colonel Wesley Clark, proposed a system for capturing lessons learned and adapting units for combat. The Chief of Staff of the Army quickly approved the recommended approach. CALL was officially stood up on August 1, 1985 as a directorate of the Combined Arms Training Activity (CATA) located at Fort Leavenworth, KS. CALL is currently a subordinate organization to the Mission Command Center of Excellence.

== Sources ==
- "The Center for Army Lessons Learned Public Website". 2007-01-26. Archived from the original on December 12, 1998.
- #333: The Center for Lessons Learned, a May 2007 story about U.S. Army Center for Army Lessons Learned from This American Life
- "Army Lessons Learned", Federal Computer Week, July 15, 2006.
- "Mission Command Center of Excellence Public Website". 2016-06-03. Archived from the original on August 6, 2014.
