= Center for the Army Profession and Ethic =

To reinforce the Army profession and its Ethic, the Army Chief of Staff (CSA) established the Army Center of Excellence for the Professional Military Ethic (ACPME) in May 2008. Located at West Point, New York, the wellspring of professional soldier values for more than 200 years, the ACPME was re-designated as the Center for the Army Profession and Ethic (CAPE) and realigned to fall under the command and control of the United States Army Training and Doctrine Command (TRADOC) and its Combined Arms Center (CAC) in August 2010. CAPE's objectives were to assess the state of Army as a profession and its members as professionals; to study and define through doctrine and strategic messaging the Army Profession; capture and promulgate the moral principles of the Army Ethic (to include Army Values), Army culture, and organizational climates; inspire trusted Army professionals to live up to their sacred oaths, increase Army members’ understanding and internalization of what it means for Soldiers and Army Civilians to be members of an honored profession; accelerate professional and character development in individuals, units, and Army culture through training, education, and leader development. AR 600-100 Army Profession and Leadership specified 12 tasks for CAPE to serve the Army in leader development, critical thinking and ethical decision making based upon the moral principles of the Army Ethic. Army Doctrine Publication (ADP) 1 and Army Doctrine Reference Publication (ADRP) 1. CAPE, as the AR 5-22 Army Force Modernization Proponent for the Army Profession, Character Development, and the Army Ethic was the US Army and lead responsible for Doctrine, Organization, Training, Materiel, Leadership and Education, Personnel and Facilities (DOTMLPF) initiatives to reinforce the Army Profession of Arms, Army Ethic, and culture. In September 2019, CAPE was merged with the Center for Army Leadership at Fort Leavenworth, KS to form the Center for the Army Profession and Leadership.

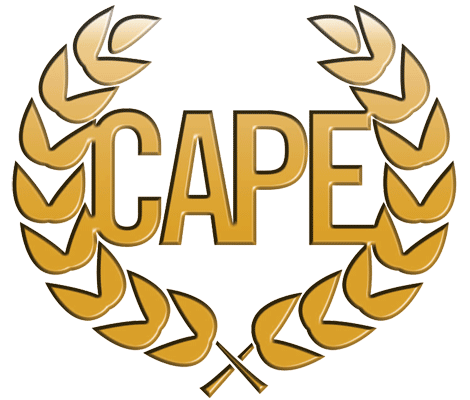
CAPE Primary Logo

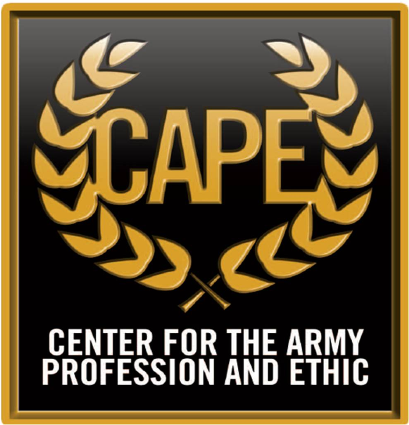
CAPE Logo

== Mission statement ==
CAPE, on behalf of CG, CAC, serves as the proponent for the Army Profession, the Army Ethic and Character Development of Army Professionals to reinforce Trust within the profession and with the American people.

== Purpose ==
To reinforce trust within the profession and with the American people: the foundation for successful accomplishment of the Army Mission, consistent with the Army Ethic.

== Key tasks ==
- Support Army wide efforts (Army Campaign Plan, TRADOC Strategic Plan, Ready and Resilient Campaign Plan and Human Dimension TF)
- Create and integrate Army Profession, Army Ethic and Character Development doctrine and concepts into training, leadership development, Professional Military Education, and the Civilian Education System
- Promulgate the Army Ethic
- Develop the Army Character Development concept, strategy, and doctrine
- Assess the state of the Army Profession and its members as professionals on a periodic basis.

== History ==
- 30 September 2019 - CAPE is closed at West Point and all functions, mission, and tasks transferred to the newly created Center for the Army Profession and Leadership (CAPL).
- 27 November 2018 - The Secretary of the Army directs the merger of CAPE with the Center for the Army Leadership (CAL).
- 14 June 2015 - ADRP 1 - The Army Profession is revised to include the Army Ethic.
- 14 June 2013 - ADRP 1 - The Army Profession doctrinal publication is released.
- 2 January 2013 - America's Army - Our Profession Education and Training Program begins.
- September 2012 - ADP 1 The Army includes for the first time Army doctrine on the Army Profession and Army professionals.
- 2 April 2012 - The Army Profession Campaign CY11 Annual Report is released.
- September 2011 - Army-Wide campaign renamed the Army Profession Campaign.
- Jan 2011 - Army-Wide Profession of Arms Campaign launched.
- October 2010 -Secretary of the Army and the Chief of Staff of the Army signed a Terms of Reference for the Review of the Army Profession in an Era of Persistent Conflict.
- July 2010 - Commanding General (CG) TRADOC and CG Combined Arms Center rename the ACPME to "Center for the Army Profession and Ethic (CAPE)" to reflect its expanded Army-wide proponency requirements, and further task organizes CAPE under CAC Leader Development and Education (LD&E)
- May 2010 -The CSA decides to reassign the ACPME from USMA to CAC, and CG TRADOC expands the ACPME proponency mission from the "professional military ethic" to encompass the entire "Army Profession and Ethic"
- March 2010 - CG TRADOC and CSA approve the Army leader development integrated priority list for Program Objective Memorandum (POM) 12–17; ACPME is #7 of 48 Army leader development initiatives with $4.5M approved per year for POM12-17 (increase from $2.5M to $4.5M was based on the expanded responsibilities assigned to the ACPME In accordance with Department of the Army (IAW DA)-wide proponency)
- January 2010 -DA G3/5/7 (Deputy Chief of Staff for Operations, Plans and Training) approved an ACPME concept plan for 2 military and 19 civilian personnel requirements
- May 2009 - CG TRADOC and CSA approved the Army leader development integrated priority list for POM 10–15; ACPME is #4 of 52 Army leader development initiatives with $2.5M approved per year for POM10-15
- March 2009 -The Army formally assigns Superintendent, USMA and the ACPME as the Army force modernization proponent for the professional military ethic and character development as reflected in Army Regulation (AR) 5-22 (Aug 09)
- May 2008 -The CSA decides to stand up a separate Army Center at USMA. USMA provides Borrowed Military Manning (BMM), and the Army resources limited civilian billets
- April 2007 -CSA assigned USMA as "Army Center of Excellence for the Professional Military Ethic." USMA delegated the mission to the existing Simon Center for the Professional Military Ethic (SCPME) under the USMA Commandant of Cadets; SCPME took on additional duties with no additional resources

== Products ==
The Center for the Army Profession and Ethic offers many products to help develop Army Professionals. Products include: Videos, Case Studies, Lesson Plans, Training Support Packages, Virtual Simulators, Games, Posters, and more.

== Virtual simulators ==
=== The Company We Keep ===
The Company We Keep is an interactive video simulation for company commanders and first sergeants. It focuses on the responsibility of the Company Command Team (CCT) members to serve as Stewards for the Profession of Arms by communicating, working as a team, counseling/mentoring within the garrison environment, and inspiring commitment to the Army Profession through daily tasks. The interactive simulation demonstrates how excellence and leadership should be modeled in the areas of training development, property accountability, materiel readiness, and personnel readiness.

=== Highly Specialized, Highly Committed ===
Highly Specialized, Highly Committed is a virtual simulation training product that focuses on Army Profession and Ethic concepts and how they relate to the leader/professional development of Soldiers as they transition into the Warrant Officer cohort.

=== A Special Trust ===
Stewards of the Profession: A Special Trust focuses on the Army Profession and Ethic, along with civil-military relations. The concepts of the profession are applied to Command Climate and Leader Development issues.

=== Backbone of the Army ===
Backbone of the Army prepares future soldiers for life in deployed situations and at home station, working through events and dilemmas that will challenge ideas of what it means to be a leader and a steward of the U.S. Army Profession.

=== The Future is Now ===
In The Future is Now includes an experience at a small private college or large state university life as a first- and second-year cadet. Through multiple playable characters cadets face many college lifestyle situations, which often conflict with the cultural and ethical norms of life as an Army Officer.

=== True Faith and Allegiance ===
Released in 2011, True Faith & Allegiance follows the progress of J.T. Taylor from high school to new soldier. This program gives new Army trainees the opportunity to understand and apply the Army Values to everyday decisions and see how these seemingly small events can have long-lasting repercussions. Ethical decision-making is a skill that improves with practice. True Faith & Allegiance gives practice and confidence in one's ability to make ethical decisions when times are tough.

=== The High Ground ===
The High Ground provides real-time, ethical decision choices with appropriate outcomes, verbal feedback and AAR summary designed not only to provide Soldiers with an entertaining, thoughtful experience that stimulates ethical reasoning, but also allows data capture to support ethics research.

=== Moral Combat ===
The ethics version of the Army game Moral Combat will provide Soldiers with a fun, entertaining experience, further ethical awareness, and intends to stimulate and evolve the moral working self as well as provide a data capture mechanism to support ethics research and moral character development.

== See also ==
- United States Army Training and Doctrine Command (TRADOC)
- Combined Arms Center (CAC)
- United States Army
- West Point, New York
