= James P. Isenhower III =

US Army lieutenant general

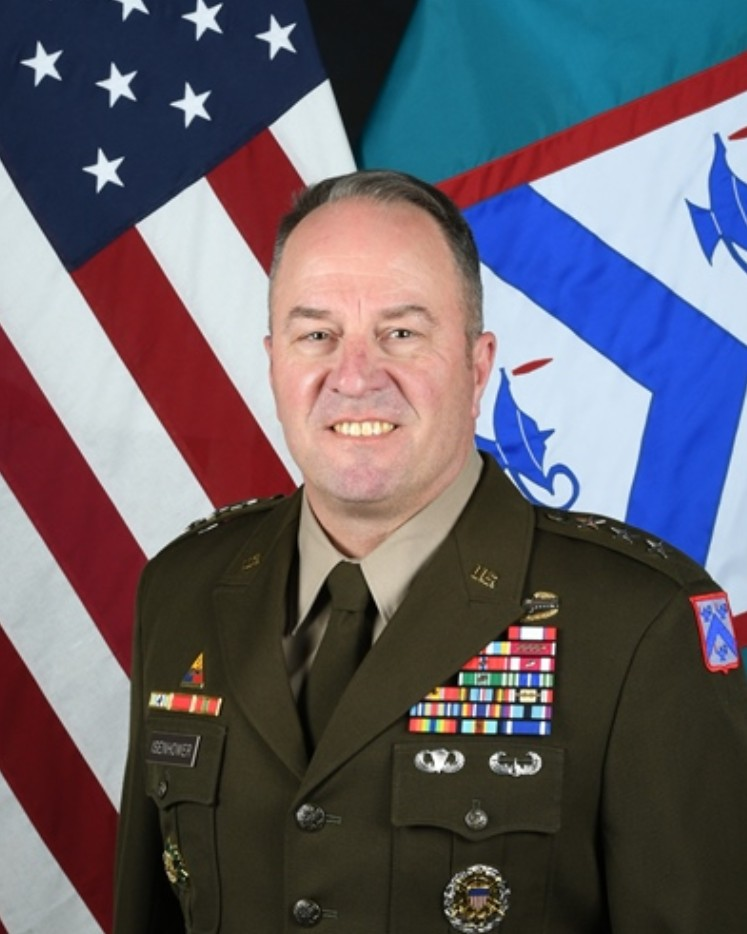
- Isenhower as a lieutenant general in 2025
- Born: 1970 (age 55–56); Chatham, New Jersey, US
- Alma mater: United States Military Academy; Duke University; United States Army Command and General Staff College; National War College
- Spouse: Sherrill Caroline Jeffers (m. 1995)
- Children: 3
- Military career
- Service: United States Army
- Service years: 1992–present
- Rank: Lieutenant General
- Units: US Army Infantry Branch; US Army Armor Branch
- Commands: 2nd Battalion, 14th Cavalry Regiment; 189th Infantry Brigade; 1st Multi-Domain Task Force; 1st Armored Division; Fort Bliss; Commandant of the United States Army Command and General Staff College; US Army Combined Arms Command; Fort Leavenworth
- Conflicts: Operations Safe Haven and Safe Passage; Operation Joint Forge; Iraq War
- Awards: Army Distinguished Service Medal; Defense Superior Service Medal; Legion of Merit; Bronze Star Medal; Meritorious Service Medal; Army Commendation Medal; Army Achievement Medal

James P. Isenhower III (born 1970) is a lieutenant general in the United States Army who has commanded the US Army Command and General Staff College, US Army Combined Arms Command, and Fort Leavenworth since October 2025. A 1992 graduate of the United States Military Academy (West Point), he is a veteran of Operations Safe Haven and Safe Passage, Operation Joint Forge, and the Iraq War. Isenhower's commands include the 1st Armored Division and Fort Bliss, and his awards include the Army Distinguished Service Medal, Defense Superior Service Medal, Legion of Merit, and Bronze Star Medal.

A native of Chatham, New Jersey and the son of a career US Army officer, Isenhower was raised on army bases and is a 1988 graduate of Olympia High School in Olympia, Washington. He graduated from West Point in 1992, and went on to a career in the Infantry and Armor branches. His military education includes the Army Command and General Staff College and the National War College, and he completed master's and doctoral degrees at Duke University.

Isenhower's command assignments included 2nd Battalion, 14th Cavalry Regiment, the 189th Infantry Brigade, the 1st Multi-Domain Task Force, the 1st Armored Division, and the post at Fort Bliss, Texas. In October 2025, he was promoted to lieutenant general and assigned to command Fort Leavenworth, the Combined Arms Command, and the Command and General Staff College.

== Early life and start of career ==
James Philo Isenhower III was born in Chatham, New Jersey in 1970, the son of James P. Isenhower Jr., a West Point graduate who attained the rank of lieutenant colonel and Margaret "Peg" Lee (Wilcox) Isenhower. He has stated that he is related to Dwight D. Eisenhower through "a very distant relative who immigrated in 1741 from Alsace-Lorraine". He was raised and educated on US Army posts, including Fort Stewart, Georgia. In December 1987, he received an appointment to the United States Military Academy at West Point from US Senator Daniel J. Evans of Washington. In March 1988, he attained the rank of Eagle Scout in the Boy Scouts of America. In June 1988, he graduated from Olympia High School in Olympia, Washington. While in high school, he played golf and took part in Boys Nation, the American Legion's annual civic training, government, and leadership forum.

Isenhower graduated from West Point in 1992 and was commissioned as a second lieutenant of Infantry. He completed the Infantry Officer Basic Course and subsequently completed Airborne School and Air Assault School. Initially assigned to the 101st Airborne Division at Fort Campbell, Kentucky, his early assignments included rifle platoon leader, antitank platoon leader, support platoon leader, rifle company executive officer, and brigade assistant operations officer (S3 Air).

=== Family ===
In November 1995, Isenhower married Sherrill Caroline Jeffers of Hopkinsville, Kentucky. They are the parents of three sons.

== Continued career ==
After completing the Armor Officer Advanced Course, in 1996 Isenhower was assigned to the 1st Cavalry Division at Fort Hood, Texas, where he served as a brigade adjutant, a tank company commander and a battalion headquarters and headquarters company commander. He was then selected for advanced schooling at Duke University, from which he received Master of Arts and Doctor of Philosophy degrees. From 2002 to 2004, he was assigned to West Point as an instructor and assistant professor in the Department of History, where he taught US history and the history of US foreign relations. Isenhower's continued military education included completion of the United States Army Command and General Staff College.

In 2005, Isenhower was posted to Fort Lewis, Washington and assigned as a squadron operations officer (S3) with the 25th Infantry Division's 1st Stryker Brigade Combat Team. In 2006, the brigade was reflagged as the 2nd Stryker Cavalry Regiment and based in Vilseck, Germany, where he served as a squadron executive officer, the regimental operations officer (S3), and the regimental executive officer. In 2009, he assumed command of 2nd Battalion, 14th Cavalry Regiment at Schofield Barracks, Hawaii. He next served as executive officer to the commanding general of United States Army Pacific at Fort Shafter, Hawaii.

== Later career ==
In 2013, Isenhower completed the National War College course as a distinguished graduate and received a Master of Science degree. From 2013 to 2015, he was assigned as a special assistant to the Chairman of the Joint Chiefs of Staff. From 2015 to 2017, he commanded the 189th Infantry Brigade at Joint Base Lewis–McChord, Washington. In 2017, he returned to Hawaii where he served for a second time as executive officer to the commanding general of US Army Pacific. In 2018, he was assigned as executive officer to the Director of the Army Staff. In 2019 he returned to Fort Hood, Texas to serve as the 1st Cavalry Division's deputy commander for support. In 2020, he returned to Joint Base Lewis–McChord as commander of the 1st Multi-Domain Task Force. In 2022, he was assigned to command the 1st Armored Division and Fort Bliss.

From August to October 2024, Isenhower was assigned as a special assistant to the army's Deputy Chief of Staff for Operations, G-3/5/7. From October 2024 to October 2025, he was Assistant Deputy G-3/5/7 and Director of Army Safety. In October 2025, he was assigned as Commandant of the United States Army Command and General Staff College and commander of the US Army Combined Arms Command and Fort Leavenworth, Kansas. The operational deployments Isenhower has participated in include Operations Safe Haven and Safe Passage (Panama, 1995), Operation Joint Forge (Bosnia-Herzegovina, 1998 to 1999), and the Operation Yudh Abhyas combined training event (2009, India). His combat experience includes three tours in Iraq in support of Operations Iraqi Freedom and New Dawn, including postings to Mosul, Baghdad, and Diyala province.

== Awards ==
Isenhower's awards and decorations include:

- Army Distinguished Service Medal
- Defense Superior Service Medal
- Legion of Merit (multiple awards)
- Bronze Star Medal (multiple awards)
- Meritorious Service Medal (multiple awards)
- Army Commendation Medal (multiple awards)
- Army Achievement Medal
- National Defense Service Medal with 2 bronze service stars
- Armed Forces Expeditionary Medal
- Iraq Campaign Medal with 3 bronze service stars
- Global War on Terrorism Expeditionary Medal
- Global War on Terrorism Service Medal
- Humanitarian Service Medal
- Army Service Ribbon
- Overseas Service Ribbon
- NATO Medal
- Combat Action Badge
- Parachutist Badge
- Air Assault Badge
- Army Staff Identification Badge
- Joint Chiefs of Staff Identification Badge

== Works by ==
- The Alleged Death of the Monroe Doctrine: Panama as a Case Study, 1977-1999 (PDF). Durham, North Carolina: Duke University. 2002.
