= Warrant Officer Basic Course =

United States Army training program

Warrant Officer Basic Course (WOBC) is the technical training program a newly appointed U.S. Army Warrant Officer receives after attending Warrant Officer Candidate School. WOBC is designed to certify warrant officers as technically and tactically competent to serve in a designated military occupation specialty. WOBC is the first major test a newly appointed officer must pass to continue serving in the Army as a warrant officer, as WO1 appointments and award of a Warrant Officer MOS are contingent upon successfully completing WOBC.

WOBC is held at multiple locations throughout the United States Army Training and Doctrine Command. For example, Signal WOBC is taught at Fort Gordon, Georgia, Aviation WOBC is taught at Fort Rucker, Alabama, and other WOBCs are taught at installations such as Fort Sill, Oklahoma, Fort Lee, Virginia, and Fort Huachuca, Arizona.

== See also ==
- Basic Officer Leaders Course
- Warrant Officer Candidate School
- Warrant Officer Basic Course (WOBC), US Marine Corps
