= Army University =

Professional military education university system of the United States Army

- Motto: Educating Army Professionals to Win in a Complex World
- Type: University system
- Established: 7 July 2015
- Parent institution: United States Army Combined Arms Command
- Affiliation: United States Army Combined Arms Command
- Chancellor: MG Trevor J. Bredenkamp
- Provost: Dr. David Dworak
- Students: 150,000
- Location: Fort Leavenworth, Kansas
- Colours: Black, gold and white
- Website: www.army.edu

Army University is a professional military education university system of the United States Army. It is the largest professional military education system in the world, with over 150,000 soldiers educated in more than 88 occupations across its worldwide network of 70 schools. Approximately 25% of its curriculum is currently accredited, primarily for officer training, and initiatives are underway to accredit all enlisted training as well.

== Colleges ==
Army University consists of five Colleges: Army Management Staff College, U.S. Army Noncomissioned Officer Academy, U.S. Army Warrant Officer Career College, Command and General Staff College, and U.S. Army War College.

== Army University Press ==
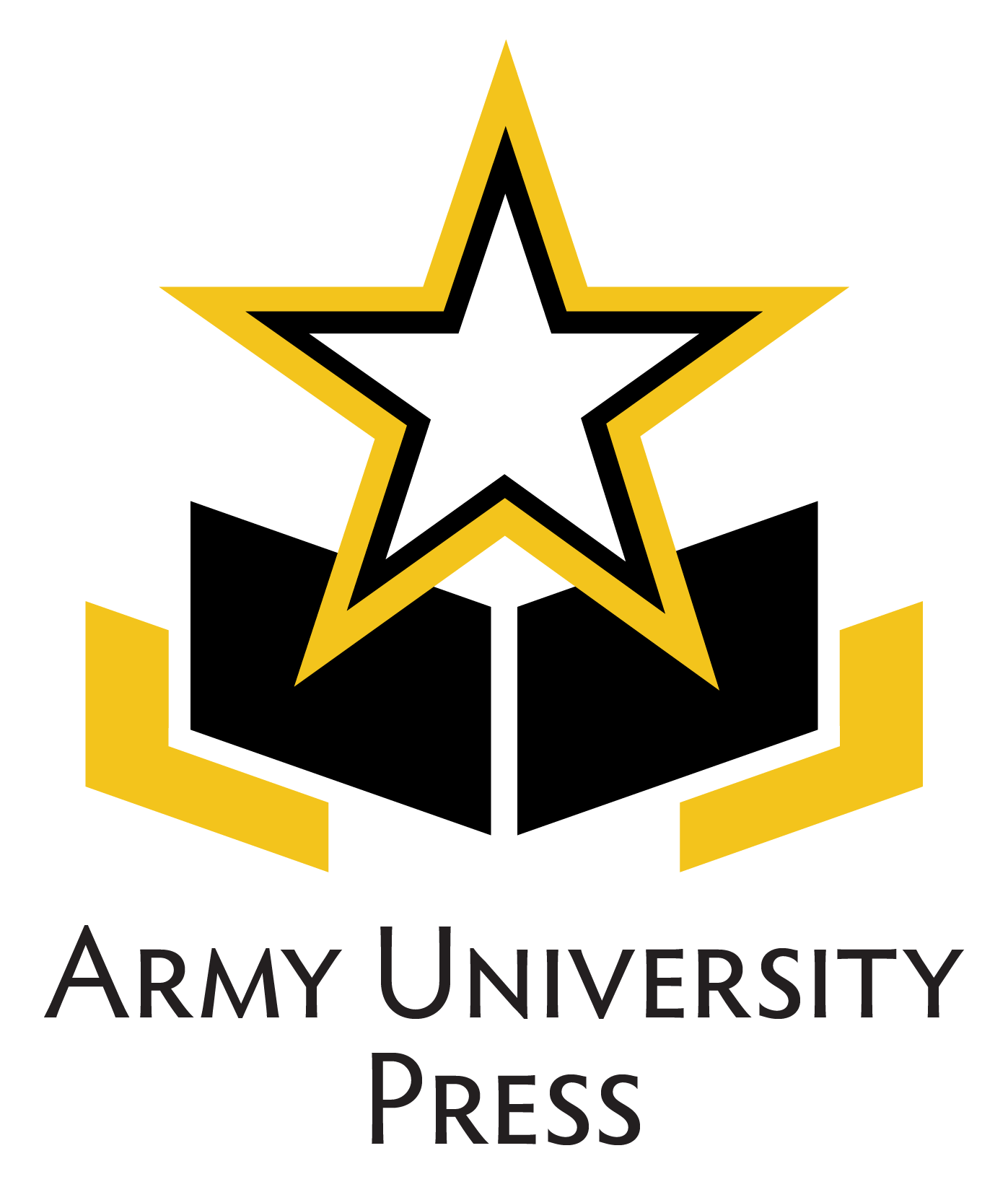
AUP logo

Army University Press is a university press affiliated with Army University. It is based out of Fort Leavenworth, Kansas.

== See also ==
- Air University
- Marine Corps University
- Texas A&M University System
