= Mission Command Center of Excellence (United States Army) =

Mission Command Center of Excellence (MCCoE)
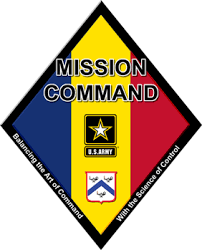
- Active: 2010 - 2026
- Country: United States
- Branch: United States Army
- Part of: United States Army Combined Arms Command
- Garrison/HQ: Fort Leavenworth, Kansas

The Mission Command Center of Excellence (MCCoE) was a leadership development and training organization of the United States Army located at Fort Leavenworth, Kansas from 2010 until 2026 when its mission was turned over to the Combined Arms Command. Their stated mission is to develop the army's Command and Control (C2) Warfighting Function using DOTMLPF-P analysis. Mission Command is the army's current concept for command and control that encourages direct decision making and decentralized execution. The MCCoE has been integrating new technology like Palantir's Maven Smart System and TITAN vehicles to assess command and control (C2) data in exercises and simulations.

== DOTMLPF-P ==
The US Army War College defines DOTMLPF-P as:

- Doctrine (D): How forces are guided by commanders (regulations, tactics, techniques, and procedures).
- Organization (O): How units are structured, staffed, and organized.
- Training (T): How the force is prepared to accomplish tasks, including exercises and simulations.
- Materiel (M): The equipment, systems, and technologies required for the mission.
- Leadership & Education (L): The development of leaders to lead effectively and adapt to new challenges.
- Personnel (P): Ensuring the right human resources, skill sets, and manpower levels are available.
- Facilities (F): The physical property and infrastructure needed to support, maintain, and train.
- Policy (P): The rules and regulations that guide or constrain operations.

== Subordinate units ==
- Army Joint Support Team (AJST)
- Air Land Sea Space Application Center (ALSSA)
- Security Force Assistance Proponent (SFAP)
- Combined Arms Doctrine Directorate (CADD)
- Center for Army Profession and Leadership (CAPL)
- Directorate of Training (DOT)
- Force Modernization Proponent Center (FMPC)
- Mission Command Transformation Integration Directorate (MC TID)
- Capability Development Integration Directorate (CDID)
