= List of active duty United States senior enlisted leaders and advisors =

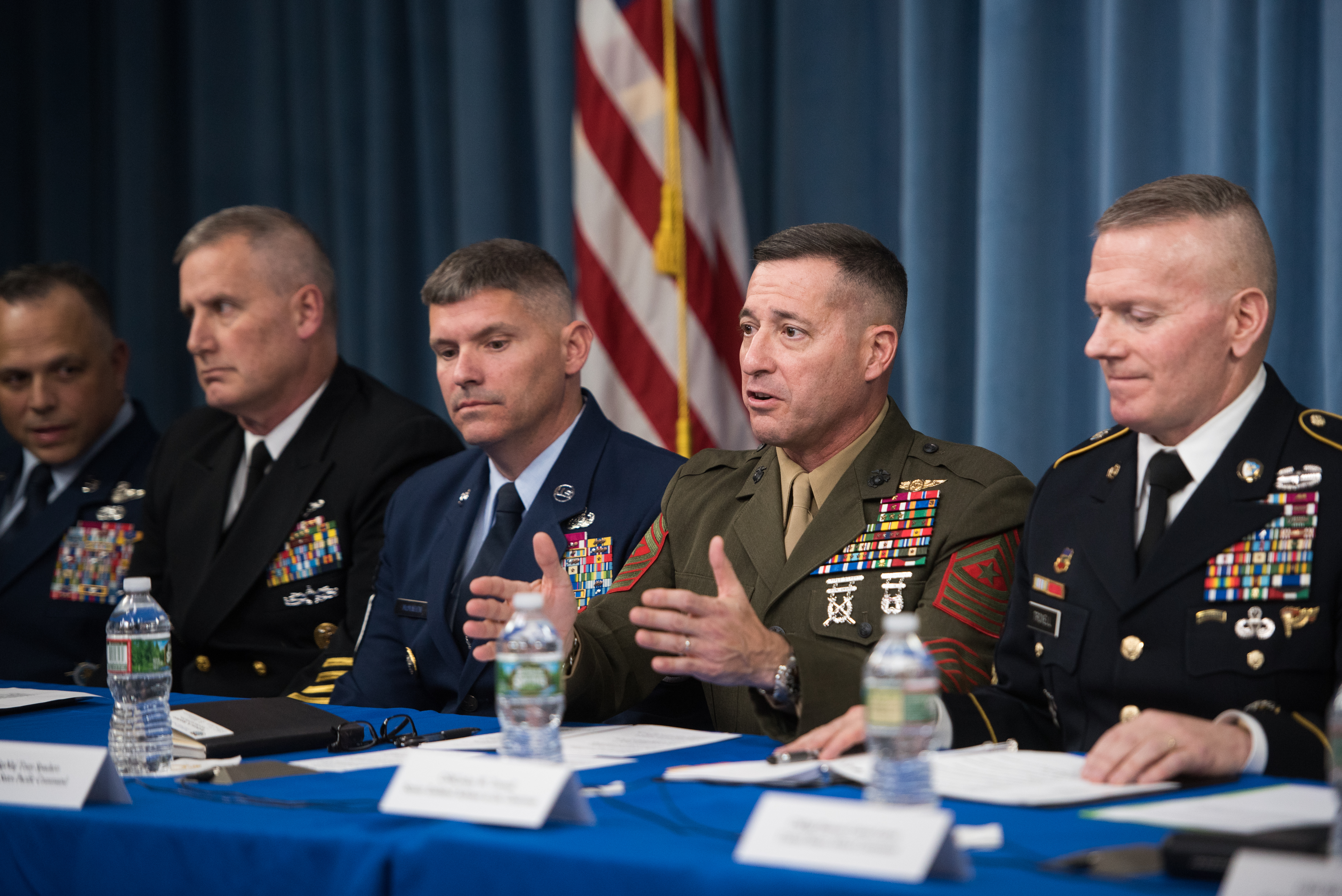
SEAC John W. Troxell (right) and the senior enlisted advisors for the unified combatant commands brief the media in the Pentagon, November 28, 2017.

This is a list of active duty United States senior enlisted leaders and advisors serving in the uniformed services of the United States. This list is intended to cover senior enlisted leaders and advisors attached to only three-star and four-star positions, with selected two-star (Note: Includes senior enlisted advisors of direct reporting units to the service chiefs (including the surgeon general and chief of chaplains), commanders/directors of a branch's senior enlisted academy and enlisted U.S. Navy sailors with the rank (not appointment) of force master chief.) and civilian positions (Note: Includes known senior enlisted advisors to cabinet secretaries (namely the secretary of defense and secretary of homeland security), deputy secretaries, service secretaries (refers to the secretaries of the Army, Navy and Air Force), under secretaries and selected assistant secretaries.) included as well.

== Background ==
Standard senior enlisted leader insignia of the U.S. uniformed services

Command sergeant major (CSM) insignia, U.S. Army

Sergeant major (SGM) insignia, U.S. Marine Corps

Command master chief petty officer (CMDCM) insignia, U.S. Navy

Command chief master sergeant (CCM) insignia, U.S. Air Force

Chief master sergeant (CMSgt) insignia, U.S. Space Force

Command master chief petty officer (CMDCM) insignia, U.S. Coast Guard

A senior enlisted advisor (SEA) is the most senior enlisted service member in a uniformed unit who acts as the top advisor and representative of enlisted personnel in the unit to the commanding officer. Formally, E-9 billets for the senior enlisted advisor are established from the field level (battalion, wing, etc.) up to the senior enlisted advisor to the chairman of the Joint Chiefs of Staff. SEAs are also known as command senior enlisted leaders (CSEL). The SEA is the principal link between the commanding officer and the enlisted service members under their charge, communicating the CO's wishes to the enlisted ranks of their assigned unit. For effective command and control of troops as well as liaising with external and atypical authorities (especially in international coalitions), a unit's senior officers and senior enlisted leader must work in concert.

The highest-ranking senior enlisted advisors represent the service branches of the uniformed services of the United States and advise the four-star chief of their service branch on enlisted matters:

- The Senior Enlisted Advisor to the Chairman (SEAC)
- The Sergeant Major of the Army (SMA)
- The Sergeant Major of the Marine Corps (SMMC)
- The Master Chief Petty Officer of the Navy (MCPON)
- The Chief Master Sergeant of the Air Force (CMSAF)
- The Chief Master Sergeant of the Space Force (CMSSF)
- The Master Chief Petty Officer of the Coast Guard (MCPOCG)
- The Senior Enlisted Advisor to the Chief of the National Guard Bureau (SEA)

== List of senior enlisted positions ==
=== Department of Defense ===
==== Office of the Secretary of Defense ====
Position insignia	Position	Photo	Incumbent	Service branch
National intelligence agencies
Defense Intelligence Agency	Command Senior Enlisted Leader, Defense Intelligence Agency (DIA)		Command Sergeant Major; Kyle J. Gillam	U.S. Army
National Geospatial-Intelligence Agency	Command Senior Enlisted Leader, National Geospatial-Intelligence Agency (NGA)		Command Master Chief; Jason T. Reynolds	U.S. Navy
National Reconnaissance Office	Senior Enlisted Leader, National Reconnaissance Office (NRO)		Chief Master Sergeant; Kevin W. Ryan Jr.	U.S. Space Force
Defense Agencies
Defense Commissary Agency	Senior Enlisted Advisor to the Director, Defense Commissary Agency (DeCA)		Command Master Chief; Mario S. Rivers	U.S. Navy
Defense Contract Management Agency	Senior Enlisted Advisor, Defense Contract Management Agency (DCMA)		Chief Master Sergeant; Babatunji A. Akande	U.S. Air Force
Defense Health Agency	Command Senior Enlisted Leader, Defense Health Agency (DHA)		Command Chief Master Sergeant; Tanya Y. Johnson	U.S. Air Force
Department of Defense Cyber Defense Command Defense Information Systems Agency	Command Senior Enlisted Leader, Department of Defense Cyber Defense Command (DCDC) and Command Senior Enlisted Leader, Defense Information Systems Agency (DISA)		Command Chief Master Sergeant; Israel Jaeger	U.S. Air Force
Defense Logistics Agency	Senior Enlisted Leader, Defense Logistics Agency (DLA)		Command Sergeant Major; Petra M. Casarez	U.S. Army
Defense Media Activity	Senior Enlisted Advisor, Defense Media Activity (DMA)		Master Chief; Mass Communication Specialist; Anthony Koch	U.S. Navy
Defense POW/MIA Accounting Agency	Senior Enlisted Advisor, Defense POW/MIA Accounting Agency (DPAA)		Sergeant Major; Lauren T.S. Flores	U.S. Army
Defense Security Cooperation Agency	Senior Enlisted Advisor to the Director, Defense Security Cooperation Agency (DSCA)		Command Chief Master Sergeant; Mikael Sundin	U.S. Air Force
Defense Threat Reduction Agency	Command Senior Enlisted Leader, Defense Threat Reduction Agency (DTRA)		Sergeant Major; Daniel E. Mangrum	U.S. Marine Corps
Other bodies
Army & Air Force Exchange Service	Senior Enlisted Advisor, Army and Air Force Exchange Service (AAFES)		Chief Master Sergeant; Richard R. Martinez	U.S. Air Force

==== Joint Chiefs of Staff ====
Position insignia	Position	Photo	Incumbent	Service branch
Office of the Senior Enlisted Advisor to the Chairman
Senior Enlisted Advisor to the Chairman	Senior Enlisted Advisor to the Chairman (SEAC)		Senior Enlisted Advisor to the Chairman; David L. Isom	U.S. Navy
Joint Staff directorates
Joint Staff	Senior Enlisted Leader, Director for Joint Force Development (J-7), Joint Staff		Sergeant Major; Daniel L. Krause	U.S. Marine Corps

==== Unified combatant commands ====
Position insignia	Position	Photo	Incumbent	Service branch
U.S. Africa Command	Command Senior Enlisted Leader, U.S. Africa Command (USAFRICOM)		Command Sergeant Major; Garric M. Banfield	U.S. Army
U.S. Central Command	Command Senior Enlisted Leader, U.S. Central Command (USCENTCOM)		Fleet Master Chief; Lateef N. Compton	U.S. Navy
U.S. Cyber Command National Security Agency Central Security Service	Command Senior Enlisted Leader, U.S. Cyber Command (USCYBERCOM) and Senior Enlisted Advisor, National Security Agency (NSA) and Central Security Service (CSS)		Command Chief Master Sergeant; Kenneth M. Bruce Jr.	U.S. Air Force
U.S. European Command	Command Senior Enlisted Leader, U.S. European Command (USEUCOM)		Command Sergeant Major; Thomas J. Holland	U.S. Army
U.S. Indo-Pacific Command	Command Senior Enlisted Leader, U.S. Indo-Pacific Command (USINDOPACOM)		Sergeant Major; Eric D. Cook	U.S. Marine Corps
U.S. Northern Command North American Aerospace Defense Command	Command Senior Enlisted Leader, U.S. Northern Command (USNORTHCOM) and North American Aerospace Defense Command (NORAD)		Command Chief Master Sergeant; John G. Storms	U.S. Air Force
U.S. Southern Command	Command Senior Enlisted Leader, U.S. Southern Command (USSOUTHCOM)		Sergeant Major; Rafael Rodriguez	U.S. Marine Corps
U.S. Space Command	Command Senior Enlisted Leader, U.S. Space Command (USSPACECOM)		Chief Master Sergeant; Jacob C. Simmons	U.S. Space Force
U.S. Special Operations Command	Command Senior Enlisted Leader, U.S. Special Operations Command (USSOCOM)		Command Sergeant Major; Andrew J. Krogman	U.S. Army
U.S. Strategic Command	Command Senior Enlisted Leader, U.S. Strategic Command (USSTRATCOM)		Command Sergeant Major; JoAnn Naumann	U.S. Army
U.S. Transportation Command	Command Senior Enlisted Leader, U.S. Transportation Command (USTRANSCOM)		Command Chief Master Sergeant; Brian P. Kruzelnick	U.S. Air Force

==== Other joint positions ====
Position insignia	Position	Photo	Incumbent	Service branch
National Guard
Senior Enlisted Advisor to the Chief of the National Guard Bureau	Senior Enlisted Advisor to the Chief of the National Guard Bureau (SEA)		Senior Enlisted Advisor; John T. Raines III	U.S. Army
Sub-unified commands
United Nations Command ROK/U.S. Combined Forces Command U.S. Forces Korea	South Korea; Senior Enlisted Leader, United Nations Command (UNC), ROK/U.S. Combined Forces Command (CFC) and U.S. Forces Korea (USFK)		Command Sergeant Major; Robin M. Bolmer	U.S. Army
U.S. Forces Japan	Japan; Senior Enlisted Leader, U.S. Forces Japan (USFJ)		Command Chief Master Sergeant; Carlos Francisco Damian	U.S. Air Force
Alaskan NORAD Region Alaskan Command Eleventh Air Force	Senior Enlisted Leader, Alaskan NORAD Region (ANR), Senior Enlisted Leader, Alaskan Command (ALCOM) and Command Chief Master Sergeant, Eleventh Air Force (11 AF)		Command Chief Master Sergeant; Heath T. Tempel	U.S. Air Force
Joint Special Operations Command	Senior Enlisted Leader, Joint Special Operations Command (JSOC)		Command Sergeant Major; Walter J. Zajkowski	U.S. Army
U.S. Special Operations Command	Senior Enlisted Leader, Special Operations Command Europe (SOCEUR)		Command Sergeant Major; Steven W. Fields	U.S. Army
Special activities
NATO Special Operations Headquarters	Command Senior Enlisted Leader, Allied Special Operations Forces Command (SOFCOM)		Command Sergeant Major; Jeremy M. Lile	U.S. Army
Combined Maritime Forces	Bahrain; Command Senior Enlisted Leader, Combined Maritime Forces (CMF)		Master Chief; Maritime Law Enforcement Specialist; Eric Gibson	U.S. Coast Guard
	Germany; Senior Enlisted Leader, Security Assistance Group – Ukraine (SAG-U), Operation Atlantic Resolve (OAR)		Command Sergeant Major; Mark A. Morgan	U.S. Army

=== Department of the Army ===
Position insignia	Position	Photo	Incumbent	Service branch
Office of the Secretary
Office of the Assistant Secretary of the Army (Acquisition, Logistics and Technology)	Sergeant Major, Assistant Secretary of the Army (Acquisition, Logistics and Technology)		Sergeant Major; Robert M. Haynie	U.S. Army
Office of the Assistant Secretary of the Army (Financial Management and Comptroller)	Sergeant Major, Assistant Secretary of the Army (Financial Management and Comptroller)		Sergeant Major; Terry L. Anderson Jr.	U.S. Army
Office of the Assistant Secretary of the Army (Manpower and Reserve Affairs)	Senior Enlisted Advisor to the Assistant Secretary of the Army (Manpower and Reserve Affairs)		Sergeant Major; Kenyatta J. Gaskins	U.S. Army
Office of the Inspector General of the United States Army	Sergeant Major, Office of the Inspector General (OTIG)		Sergeant Major; Delia Quintero	U.S. Army

==== United States Army ====
Position insignia	Position	Photo	Incumbent	Service branch
Army Staff
Sergeant Major of the Army	Sergeant Major of the Army (SMA)		Sergeant Major of the Army; Michael R. Weimer	U.S. Army
Deputy Chief of Staff for Personnel (G-1)	Sergeant Major, Deputy Chief of Staff for Personnel (G-1)		Sergeant Major; Christopher P. Stevens	U.S. Army
Deputy Chief of Staff for Intelligence (G-2)	Sergeant Major, Deputy Chief of Staff for Intelligence (G-2)		Sergeant Major; Jose G. Melendez	U.S. Army
Deputy Chief of Staff for Operations, Plans, and Training (G-3/5/7)	Sergeant Major, Deputy Chief of Staff for Operations, Plans, and Training (G-3/5/7)		Sergeant Major; Alexander Kupratty	U.S. Army
Deputy Chief of Staff for Logistics (G-4)	Sergeant Major, Deputy Chief of Staff for Logistics (G-4)		Sergeant Major; Jorge C. Escobedo	U.S. Army
Deputy Chief of Staff for Cyber (G-6)	Sergeant Major, Deputy Chief of Staff for Command, Control, Communications, Cyber Operations and Networks (G-6)		Sergeant Major; Kristie L. Brady	U.S. Army
Deputy Chief of Staff for Installations (G-9)	Senior Enlisted Advisor to the Deputy Chief of Staff for Installations (G-9)		Sergeant Major; Michael J. Perry III	U.S. Army
Army commands (and subordinated units)
U.S. Army Materiel Command	Command Sergeant Major, U.S. Army Materiel Command (AMC)		Command Sergeant Major; Jacinto Garza	U.S. Army
U.S. Army Installation Management Command	Command Sergeant Major, U.S. Army Installation Management Command (IMCOM)		Command Sergeant Major; Corey J. Perry	U.S. Army
U.S. Army Transformation and Training Command	Command Sergeant Major, U.S. Army Transformation and Training Command (T2COM)		Command Sergeant Major; Raymond S. Harris	U.S. Army
U.S. Army Center for Initial Military Training	Command Sergeant Major, U.S. Army Center for Initial Military Training (USACIMT)		Command Sergeant Major; Michael J. McMurdy	U.S. Army
U.S. Army Combined Arms Command	Command Sergeant Major, U.S. Army Combined Arms Command (USACAC) and Senior Enlisted Leader, Fort Leavenworth		Command Sergeant Major; Shawn F. Carns	U.S. Army
U.S. Army Futures and Concepts Command	Command Sergeant Major, U.S. Army Futures and Concepts Command (FCC)		Command Sergeant Major; William A. Justice	U.S. Army
U.S. Army Recruiting Command	Command Sergeant Major, U.S. Army Recruiting Command (USAREC)		Command Sergeant Major; Shade S. Munday	U.S. Army
NCO Leadership Center of Excellence/U.S. Army Sergeants Major Academy	Commandant, NCO Leadership Center of Excellence (NCOLCoE) and Enlisted Commandant, U.S. Army Sergeants Major Academy (USASMA)		Command Sergeant Major; Tammy M. Everette	U.S. Army
U.S. Army Western Hemisphere Command	Command Sergeant Major, U.S. Army Western Hemisphere Command (USAWHC)		Command Sergeant Major; Nema Mobarakzadeh	U.S. Army
U.S. Army North	Command Sergeant Major, U.S. Army North (ARNORTH) and Senior Enlisted Leader, Fort Sam Houston and Camp Bullis		Command Sergeant Major; Jerimiah E. Gan	U.S. Army
Army service component commands
U.S. Army Central	Command Sergeant Major, U.S. Army Central (ARCENT)		Command Sergeant Major; Eric R. McCray Sr.	U.S. Army
U.S. Army Cyber Command	Command Sergeant Major, U.S. Army Cyber Command (ARCYBER)		Command Sergeant Major; Jebin R. Heyse	U.S. Army
U.S. Army Europe and Africa	Command Sergeant Major, U.S. Army Europe and Africa (USAREUR-AF)		Command Sergeant Major; Christopher L. Mullinax	U.S. Army
U.S. Army Pacific	Command Sergeant Major, U.S. Army Pacific (USARPAC)		Command Sergeant Major; Jason P. Schmidt	U.S. Army
U.S. Army Special Operations Command	Command Sergeant Major, U.S. Army Special Operations Command (USASOC)		Command Sergeant Major; David R. Waldo	U.S. Army
U.S. Army Space and Missile Defense Command	Command Sergeant Major, U.S. Army Space and Missile Defense Command (USASMDC)		Command Sergeant Major; John W. Foley	U.S. Army
Direct reporting units
U.S. Army Chaplain Corps	Regimental Sergeant Major, U.S. Army Chaplain Corps		Sergeant Major; Meaghan B. Simmons	U.S. Army
U.S. Army Corps of Engineers	Command Sergeant Major, U.S. Army Corps of Engineers (USACE)		Command Sergeant Major; Douglas W. Galick	U.S. Army
U.S. Army Medical Command Army Medical Department	Command Sergeant Major, U.S. Army Medical Command (MEDCOM) and Command Sergeant Major, Army Medical Department (AMEDD)		Command Sergeant Major; John E. Dobbins	U.S. Army
U.S. Army Reserve	Command Sergeant Major, U.S. Army Reserve (USAR)		Command Sergeant Major; Gregory Betty	U.S. Army
U.S. Military Academy	Command Sergeant Major, United States Military Academy (USMA)		Command Sergeant Major; Phil K. Barretto	U.S. Army
Operating forces
First United States Army	Command Sergeant Major, First Army		Command Sergeant Major; Christopher A. Prosser	U.S. Army
Eighth Army	Command Sergeant Major, Eighth Army		Command Sergeant Major; Jeffery D. Weaver	U.S. Army
I Corps	Command Sergeant Major, I Corps and Senior Enlisted Leader, Joint Base Lewis–McChord		Command Sergeant Major; Jonathan E. Reffeor	U.S. Army
III Armored Corps	Command Sergeant Major, III Armored Corps and Senior Enlisted Leader, Fort Hood		Command Sergeant Major; John P. McDwyer	U.S. Army
V Corps	Command Sergeant Major, V Corps		Command Sergeant Major; Philip B. Blaisdell	U.S. Army
XVIII Airborne Corps	Command Sergeant Major, XVIII Airborne Corps and Senior Enlisted Leader, Fort Bragg		Command Sergeant Major; Bryan D. Barker	U.S. Army
Army National Guard
Army National Guard	Command Sergeant Major, Army National Guard (ARNG)		Command Sergeant Major; James B. Kendrick	U.S. Army

=== Department of the Navy ===
Position insignia	Position	Photo	Incumbent	Service branch
Office of the Secretary
Command Master Chief Petty Officer Office of the Naval Inspector General	Command Master Chief, Office of the Naval Inspector General (NAVIG)		Command Master Chief; Dennis L. Hathorn	U.S. Navy

==== United States Marine Corps ====
Position insignia	Position	Photo	Incumbent	Service branch
Headquarters Marine Corps
Sergeant Major of the Marine Corps	Sergeant Major of the Marine Corps (SMMC)		Sergeant Major of the Marine Corps; Carlos A. Ruiz	U.S. Marine Corps
Manpower and Reserve Affairs, Headquarters Marine Corps	Sergeant Major, Manpower and Reserve Affairs (M&RA)		Sergeant Major; Jacob M. Reiff	U.S. Marine Corps
Plans, Policies and Operations, Headquarters Marine Corps	Senior Enlisted Advisor, Deputy Commandant for Plans, Policies, and Operations (DC PP&O)		Master Gunnery Sergeant; Dallas W. Miller	U.S. Marine Corps
United States Marine Corps Aviation	Senior Enlisted Advisor, Deputy Commandant for Aviation (DCA)		Master Gunnery Sergeant; Pedro Hernandez	U.S. Marine Corps
Combat Development and Integration, Headquarters Marine Corps Marine Corps Combat Development Command	Sergeant Major, Marine Corps Combat Development Command (MCCDC) and Sergeant Major, Combat Development and Integration (CD&I)		Sergeant Major; Peter A. Siaw	U.S. Marine Corps
Deputy Commandant for Information	Senior Enlisted Advisor, Deputy Commandant for Information (DCI)		Master Gunnery Sergeant; Samuel W. Castro Jr.	U.S. Marine Corps
U.S. Marine Corps Training and Education Command	Senior Enlisted Advisor, Deputy Commandant for Training and Education (DC T&E) and Sergeant Major, U.S. Marine Corps Training and Education Command (TECOM)		Sergeant Major; Ryan A. Gnecco	U.S. Marine Corps
Marine Corps University	Director, Marine Corps Senior Enlisted Academy and College of Enlisted Military Education		Sergeant Major; Michael W. Hensley	U.S. Marine Corps
Operating forces
U.S. Marine Corps Forces Command Fleet Marine Force, Atlantic	Sergeant Major, U.S. Marine Corps Forces Command (MARFORCOM), U.S. Marine Corps Forces Northern Command (MARFORNORTH) and Fleet Marine Force, Atlantic (FMFLANT)		Sergeant Major; David A. Wilson	U.S. Marine Corps
Command Master Chief Petty Officer Fleet Marine Force, Atlantic	Command Master Chief, U.S. Marine Corps Forces Command (MARFORCOM), U.S. Marine Corps Forces Northern Command (MARFORNORTH) and Fleet Marine Force, Atlantic (FMFLANT)		Command Master Chief; Sandra A. Dyal	U.S. Navy
II Marine Expeditionary Force	Sergeant Major, II Marine Expeditionary Force (II MEF)		Sergeant Major; Anthony J. Loftus	U.S. Marine Corps
Command Master Chief Petty Officer II Marine Expeditionary Force	Command Master Chief, II Marine Expeditionary Force (II MEF)		Command Master Chief; John C. Beck	U.S. Navy
U.S. Marine Corps Forces, Pacific	Sergeant Major, U.S. Marine Corps Forces, Pacific (MARFORPAC)		Sergeant Major; Joy M. Kitashima	U.S. Marine Corps
Command Master Chief Petty Officer U.S. Marine Corps Forces, Pacific	Command Master Chief, U.S. Marine Corps Forces, Pacific (MARFORPAC)		Command Master Chief; Charles F. Ziervogel	U.S. Navy
I Marine Expeditionary Force	Sergeant Major, I Marine Expeditionary Force (I MEF)		Sergeant Major; Rodney E. Nevinger	U.S. Marine Corps
Command Master Chief Petty Officer I Marine Expeditionary Force	Command Master Chief, I Marine Expeditionary Force (I MEF)		Command Master Chief; Loren D. Rucker	U.S. Navy
III Marine Expeditionary Force	Sergeant Major, III Marine Expeditionary Force (III MEF)		Sergeant Major; Christopher J. Adams	U.S. Marine Corps
Command Master Chief Petty Officer III Marine Expeditionary Force	Command Master Chief, III Marine Expeditionary Force (III MEF)		Command Master Chief; Donald O. Leppert	U.S. Navy
Marine Forces Reserve
Marine Forces Reserve U.S. Marine Corps Forces, South	Sergeant Major, Marine Forces Reserve (MARFORRES) and U.S. Marine Corps Forces, South (MARFORSOUTH)		Sergeant Major; Edwin A. Mota	U.S. Marine Corps
Command Master Chief Petty Officer Marine Forces Reserve U.S. Marine Corps Forces, South	Command Master Chief, Marine Forces Reserve (MARFORRES) and U.S. Marine Corps Forces, South (MARFORSOUTH)		Command Master Chief; Michael T. Mussett	U.S. Navy

==== United States Navy ====
Position insignia	Position	Photo	Incumbent	Service branch
Office of the Chief of Naval Operations
Master Chief Petty Officer of the Navy	Master Chief Petty Officer of the Navy (MCPON)		Master Chief Petty Officer of the Navy; John J. Perryman IV	U.S. Navy
Fleet Master Chief Petty Officer Bureau of Naval Personnel	Fleet Master Chief, Personnel, Manpower, and Training (N1/NT)		Fleet Master Chief; John H. Walker Jr.	U.S. Navy
Force Master Chief Petty Officer Navy Personnel Command	Force Master Chief, Navy Personnel Command (NPC)		Force Master Chief; William P. Houlihan	U.S. Navy
Force Master Chief Petty Officer Navy Reserve Force	Force Master Chief, Navy Reserve Force (NRF)		Force Master Chief; Nicole C. Rios	U.S. Navy
Force Master Chief Petty Officer Bureau of Medicine and Surgery	Force Master Chief, Bureau of Medicine and Surgery (BUMED) and Director, Hospital Corps		Force Master Chief; PatrickPaul C. Mangaran	U.S. Navy
Type commands
Force Master Chief Petty Officer Commander, Naval Air Force Pacific	Force Master Chief, Naval Air Force, U.S. Pacific Fleet (NAVAIRPAC)		Force Master Chief; Jason M. Haka	U.S. Navy
Force Master Chief Petty Officer Naval Air Force Atlantic	Force Master Chief, Naval Air Force Atlantic (NAVAIRLANT)		Force Master Chief; Jimmy W. Hailey III	U.S. Navy
Force Master Chief Petty Officer Naval Information Forces	Force Master Chief, Naval Information Forces (NAVIFOR)		Force Master Chief; Augustine C. Cooper	U.S. Navy
Force Master Chief Petty Officer Submarine Force Atlantic	Force Master Chief, Submarine Force Atlantic (COMSUBLANT)		Force Master Chief; Matthew J. Schecter	U.S. Navy
Force Master Chief Petty Officer Submarine Force, U.S. Pacific Fleet	Force Master Chief, Submarine Force, U.S. Pacific Fleet (COMSUBPAC)		Force Master Chief; Aaron Lee	U.S. Navy
Force Master Chief Petty Officer Naval Surface Force, U.S. Pacific Fleet	Force Master Chief, Naval Surface Force, U.S. Pacific Fleet (COMNAVSURFPAC)		Force Master Chief; Larry A. Lynch	U.S. Navy
Command Master Chief Petty Officer Naval Surface Force, U.S. Pacific Fleet	Command Master Chief, Naval Surface Force, U.S. Pacific Fleet (COMNAVSURFPAC)		Command Master Chief; Charles Smith	U.S. Navy
Force Master Chief Petty Officer Naval Surface Force Atlantic	Force Master Chief, Naval Surface Force Atlantic (COMNAVSURFLANT)		Force Master Chief; Jon D. Lonsdale	U.S. Navy
Operating forces
Command Master Chief Petty Officer U.S. Second Fleet	Command Master Chief, U.S. Second Fleet		Command Master Chief; Jason S. Avin	U.S. Navy
Command Master Chief Petty Officer Military Sealift Command	Command Master Chief, Military Sealift Command (MSC)		Force Master Chief; Steven W. Bosco	U.S. Navy
Force Master Chief Petty Officer Navy Expeditionary Combat Command	Force Master Chief, Navy Expeditionary Combat Command (NECC)		Force Master Chief; Eric W. Neal	U.S. Navy
Fleet Master Chief Petty Officer U.S. Naval Forces Europe-Africa	Fleet Master Chief, U.S. Naval Forces Europe-Africa (CNE-CNA)		Fleet Master Chief; Christopher B. King	U.S. Navy
Command Master Chief Petty Officer U.S. Sixth Fleet	Command Master Chief, U.S. Sixth Fleet		Command Master Chief; Medea A. Dudley	U.S. Navy
Fleet Master Chief Petty Officer U.S. Pacific Fleet	Fleet Master Chief, U.S. Pacific Fleet (USPACFLT)		Fleet Master Chief; Donald L. Davis Jr.	U.S. Navy
Command Master Chief Petty Officer U.S. Third Fleet	Command Master Chief, U.S. Third Fleet		Command Master Chief; H. Trenton Schmidt	U.S. Navy
Command Master Chief Petty Officer U.S. Seventh Fleet	Command Master Chief, U.S. Seventh Fleet		Command Master Chief; Daniel K. Field	U.S. Navy
Fleet Master Chief Petty Officer U.S. Naval Forces Central Command	Fleet Master Chief, U.S. Naval Forces Central Command (NAVCENT)		Command Master Chief; Jason R. Dunn	U.S. Navy
Command Master Chief Petty Officer U.S. Naval Forces Central Command	Command Master Chief, U.S. Naval Forces Central Command (NAVCENT)		Command Master Chief; Sevorn A. Bascom	U.S. Navy
Command Master Chief Petty Officer U.S. Fleet Cyber Command U.S. Tenth Fleet	Command Master Chief, U.S. Fleet Cyber Command (FCC) and Command Master Chief, U.S. Tenth Fleet		Command Master Chief; Brian R. Happli	U.S. Navy
Command Master Chief Petty Officer U.S. Fleet Cyber Command U.S. Tenth Fleet	Command Senior Enlisted Leader, U.S. Fleet Cyber Command (FCC) and Command Senior Enlisted Leader, U.S. Tenth Fleet		Master Chief; Cyber Warfare Technician; Douglas A. Sykes	U.S. Navy
Force Master Chief Petty Officer Naval Special Warfare Command	Force Master Chief, Naval Special Warfare Command (NAVSPECWARCOM)		Force Master Chief; Patrick C. West	U.S. Navy
Shore establishment
Command Master Chief Petty Officer Naval Sea Systems Command	Command Master Chief, Naval Sea Systems Command (NAVSEA)		Command Master Chief; Blake G. Schimmel	U.S. Navy
Command Master Chief Petty Officer Naval Air Systems Command	Command Master Chief, Naval Air Systems Command (NAVAIR)		Command Master Chief; James W. Stedding	U.S. Navy
Force Master Chief Petty Officer Navy Installations Command	Force Master Chief, Commander, Navy Installations Command (CNIC)		Force Master Chief; Andre D. Brown	U.S. Navy
Force Master Chief Petty Officer Naval Facilities Engineering Systems Command	Force Master Chief, Naval Facilities Engineering Systems Command (NAVFAC)		Force Master Chief; Kevin M. Nolan	U.S. Navy
Command Master Chief Petty Officer Strategic Systems Programs	Command Master Chief, Strategic Systems Programs (SSP)		Command Master Chief; Jon G. Miller	U.S. Navy
Force Master Chief Petty Officer Naval Education and Training Command	Force Master Chief, Naval Education and Training Command (NETC)		Force Master Chief; Ben Hodges	U.S. Navy
Command Master Chief Petty Officer U.S. Navy Senior Enlisted Academy	Director, U.S. Navy Senior Enlisted Academy (SEA)		Command Master Chief; Veronica C. Holliday	U.S. Navy
Command Master Chief Petty Officer U.S. Naval Academy	Command Master Chief, United States Naval Academy (USNA)		Command Master Chief; Michael G. Carbone	U.S. Navy

=== Department of the Air Force ===
Position insignia	Position	Photo	Incumbent	Service branch
Office of the Secretary
Office of the Assistant Secretary of the Air Force (Manpower and Reserve Affairs)	Command Chief Master Sergeant, Assistant Secretary of the Air Force (Manpower and Reserve Affairs)		Command Chief Master Sergeant; Jeremiah W. Ross	U.S. Air Force
Office of the Assistant Secretary of the Air Force (Financial Management and Comptroller)	Executive for Enlisted Matters to the Assistant Secretary of the Air Force (Financial Management and Comptroller)		Chief Master Sergeant; Leah M. M. Anderson	U.S. Air Force
Former office of the Assistant Secretary of the Air Force (Installations, Environment & Energy)	Senior Enlisted Advisor, Office of the Assistant Secretary of the Air Force (Energy, Installations and Environment)		Chief Master Sergeant; Wendell J. Snider	U.S. Air Force

==== United States Air Force ====
Position insignia	Position	Photo	Incumbent	Service branch
Air Staff
Chief Master Sergeant of the Air Force	Chief Master Sergeant of the Air Force (CMSAF)		Chief Master Sergeant of the Air Force; David R. Wolfe	U.S. Air Force
Air Staff	Senior Enlisted Leader, Deputy Chief of Staff for Manpower, Personnel and Services (A1)		Chief Master Sergeant; Thomas E. Temple	U.S. Air Force
U.S. Air Force Medical Service	Chief, Medical Enlisted Force, U.S Air Force and U.S. Space Force and Enlisted Corps Chief, Office of the Surgeon General (OSG)		Chief Master Sergeant; James M. Woods	U.S. Air Force
Air Force major commands (and subordinated commands)
Air Combat Command	Command Chief Master Sergeant, Air Combat Command (ACC)		Command Chief Master Sergeant; Jeremy L. Unterseher	U.S. Air Force
Air Education and Training Command	Command Chief Master Sergeant, Air Education and Training Command (AETC)		Command Chief Master Sergeant; Chad W. Bickley	U.S. Air Force
Air University	Command Chief Master Sergeant, Air University		Command Chief Master Sergeant; Raun M. Howell	U.S. Air Force
Air Force Global Strike Command	Command Chief Master Sergeant, Air Force Global Strike Command (AFGSC) and Air Forces Strategic – Air (AFSTRAT-AIR)		Command Chief Master Sergeant; Shawn M. Aiello	U.S. Air Force
Air Force Materiel Command	Command Chief Master Sergeant, Air Force Materiel Command (AFMC)		Command Chief Master Sergeant; James E. Fitch II	U.S. Air Force
Air Force Life Cycle Management Center	Command Chief Master Sergeant, Air Force Life Cycle Management Center (AFLCMC)		Command Chief Master Sergeant; Timothy J. Wieser	U.S. Air Force
Air Force Sustainment Center	Command Chief Master Sergeant, Air Force Sustainment Center (AFSC)		Command Chief Master Sergeant; Carlos E. Labrador	U.S. Air Force
Air Force Reserve Command	Senior Enlisted Advisor to the Chief of Air Force Reserve (AF/RE) and Command Chief Master Sergeant, Air Force Reserve Command (AFRC)		Command Chief Master Sergeant; Israel Nuñez	U.S. Air Force
Air Force Special Operations Command	Command Chief Master Sergeant, Air Force Special Operations Command (AFSOC)		Command Chief Master Sergeant; Courtney C. Freeman	U.S. Air Force
Air Mobility Command	Command Chief Master Sergeant, Air Mobility Command (AMC)		Command Chief Master Sergeant; Jamie L. Newman	U.S. Air Force
Pacific Air Forces	Command Chief Master Sergeant, Pacific Air Forces (PACAF)		Command Chief Master Sergeant; Kathleen M. McCool	U.S. Air Force
U.S. Air Forces in Europe U.S. Air Forces in Africa	Command Chief Master Sergeant, U.S. Air Forces in Europe – Air Forces Africa (USAFE-AFAFRICA)		Command Chief Master Sergeant; Randy Kwiatkowski	U.S. Air Force
Numbered air forces
First Air Force (Air Forces Northern) Continental U.S. NORAD Region - Air Forces Northern Continental U.S. NORAD Region	Command Chief Master Sergeant, First Air Force (Air Forces Northern/AFNORTH) (1 AF) and Command Chief Master Sergeant, Continental U.S. NORAD Region (CONR)		Command Chief Master Sergeant; Nathaniel C. Durfee	U.S. Air Force
Fifth Air Force	Command Chief Master Sergeant, Fifth Air Force (5 AF)		Command Chief Master Sergeant; Shaun E. Campbell	U.S. Air Force
Seventh Air Force (Air Forces Korea)	Command Chief Master Sergeant, Seventh Air Force (Air Forces Korea) (7 AF)		Command Chief Master Sergeant; Thomas C. Schaefer II	U.S. Air Force
Ninth Air Force U.S. Air Forces Central Command	Command Chief Master Sergeant, Ninth Air Force (U.S. Air Forces Central Command/USAFCENT) (9 AF)		Command Chief Master Sergeant; Joshua J. Wiener	U.S. Air Force
Sixteenth Air Force Air Forces Cyber	Command Chief Master Sergeant, Sixteenth Air Force (16 AF) and Command Chief Master Sergeant, Air Forces Cyber (AFCYBER)		Command Chief Master Sergeant; Andrew J. McKendree	U.S. Air Force
Direct reporting units
U.S. Air Force Academy	Command Chief Master Sergeant, United States Air Force Academy (USAFA)		Command Chief Master Sergeant; John C. Alsvig	U.S. Air Force
Air National Guard
Air National Guard	Command Chief Master Sergeant, Air National Guard (ANG)		Command Chief Master Sergeant; Joshua D. Moore	U.S. Air Force

==== United States Space Force ====
Position insignia	Position	Photo	Incumbent	Service branch
Space Staff
Chief Master Sergeant of the Space Force	Chief Master Sergeant of the Space Force (CMSSF)		Chief Master Sergeant of the Space Force; John F. Bentivegna	U.S. Space Force
Space Staff	Senior Enlisted Advisor, Deputy Chief of Space Operations for Operations (S3/4/7/10)		Chief Master Sergeant; Amber A. Abramowski	U.S. Space Force
Space Staff	Senior Enlisted Advisor, Deputy Chief of Space Operations for Strategy, Plans, Programs, Requirements, and Analysis (S5/8)		Chief Master Sergeant; Steve Ha	U.S. Space Force
Field commands
Space Operations Command	Senior Enlisted Leader, Space Operations Command (SpOC)		Chief Master Sergeant; Michael J. Rozneck	U.S. Space Force
Space Systems Command	Senior Enlisted Leader, Space Systems Command (SSC)		Chief Master Sergeant; Jacqueline Sauvé	U.S. Space Force
U.S. Space Forces – Space	Senior Enlisted Leader, U.S. Space Forces – Space (S4S)		Chief Master Sergeant; Tina R. Timmerman	U.S. Space Force

=== Department of Homeland Security ===
==== United States Coast Guard ====
Position insignia	Position	Photo	Incumbent	Service branch
Office of the Commandant
Master Chief Petty Officer of the Coast Guard	Master Chief Petty Officer of the Coast Guard (MCPOCG)		Master Chief Petty Officer of the Coast Guard; Phillip N. Waldron	U.S. Coast Guard
Deputy Master Chief Petty Officer of the Coast Guard	Deputy Master Chief Petty Officer of the Coast Guard (DCPOCG)		Command Master Chief; Jahmal A. Pereira	U.S. Coast Guard
Coast Guard Headquarters
Command Master Chief, Deputy Commandant for Operations	Command Master Chief, Deputy Commandant for Operations (DCO)		Command Master Chief; Andrea L. Martynowski	U.S. Coast Guard
Master Chief Petty Officer of the Coast Guard Reserve	Master Chief Petty Officer of the Coast Guard Reserve (MCPO-CGR)		Command Master Chief; William B. Adams	U.S. Coast Guard
Command Master Chief U.S. Coast Guard Academy	Command Master Chief, U.S. Coast Guard Academy (USCGA)		Command Master Chief; Evan C. Burch	U.S. Coast Guard
	Force Master Chief, Enlisted Professional Military Education (EPME)		Command Master Chief; Matthew D. Buckman	U.S. Coast Guard
Area commands
Area Command Master Chief Coast Guard Atlantic Area	Command Master Chief, Coast Guard Atlantic Area (LANTAREA)		Command Master Chief; Charlie F. Salls	U.S. Coast Guard
Area Command Master Chief Coast Guard Pacific Area	Command Master Chief, Coast Guard Pacific Area (PACAREA)		Command Master Chief; Maria L. D'Angelo	U.S. Coast Guard

== List of pending appointments ==
Current position	Designated position insignia	Designated position	Photo	Name	Service branch	Status and date
Joint assignments
Command Sergeant Major, U.S. Army Transformation and Training Command		Command Senior Enlisted Leader, U.S. Southern Command		Command Sergeant Major Raymond S. Harris	U.S. Army	Selection announced 12 May 2026
Command Senior Enlisted Leader, Special Operations Command Europe		Command Senior Enlisted Leader, National Geospatial-Intelligence Agency		Command Sergeant Major Steven W. Fields	U.S. Army	Selection announced 8 June 2026
Command Chief Master Sergeant, Fifth Air Force (5 AF)	Defense Threat Reduction Agency	Command Senior Enlisted Leader, Defense Threat Reduction Agency (DTRA)		Command Chief Master Sergeant; Shaun E. Campbell	U.S. Air Force	Selection announced 22 December 2025
United States Army
Sergeant Major, U.S. Army Forces Command (FORSCOM) (G-1)	Deputy Chief of Staff for Personnel (G-1)	Sergeant Major, Deputy Chief of Staff for Personnel (G-1)		Sergeant Major; Eva M. Commons	U.S. Army	Selection announced 18 July 2025
Command Sergeant Major, 56th Artillery Command	U.S. Army Space and Missile Defense Command	Command Sergeant Major, U.S. Army Space and Missile Defense Command (USASMDC)		Command Sergeant Major; Rickey G. Jackson	U.S. Army	Selection announced 10 July 2025
Executive Officer to the Sergeant Major of the Army (SMA)	U.S. Army Recruiting Command	Command Sergeant Major, U.S. Army Recruiting Command (USAREC)		Sergeant Major; Joseph W. Wilson	U.S. Army	Selection announced 18 July 2025

== See also ==
- Sergeant major (United States)
- Master chief petty officer
- Chief master sergeant
- Senior Enlisted Advisor to the Chairman
- Sergeant Major of the Army
- Sergeant Major of the Marine Corps
- Master Chief Petty Officer of the Navy
- Chief Master Sergeant of the Air Force
- Chief Master Sergeant of the Space Force
- Senior Enlisted Advisor to the Chief of the National Guard Bureau
- Command Sergeant Major of the US Army Reserve
- List of active duty United States four-star officers
- List of active duty United States three-star officers
- List of active duty United States Army major generals
- List of active duty United States Marine Corps major generals
- List of active duty United States rear admirals
- List of active duty United States Air Force major generals
- List of active duty United States Space Force general officers
- List of current United States National Guard major generals
