= Command Chief Warrant Officer of the US Army Reserve =

Command Chief Warrant Officer of the United States Army Reserve

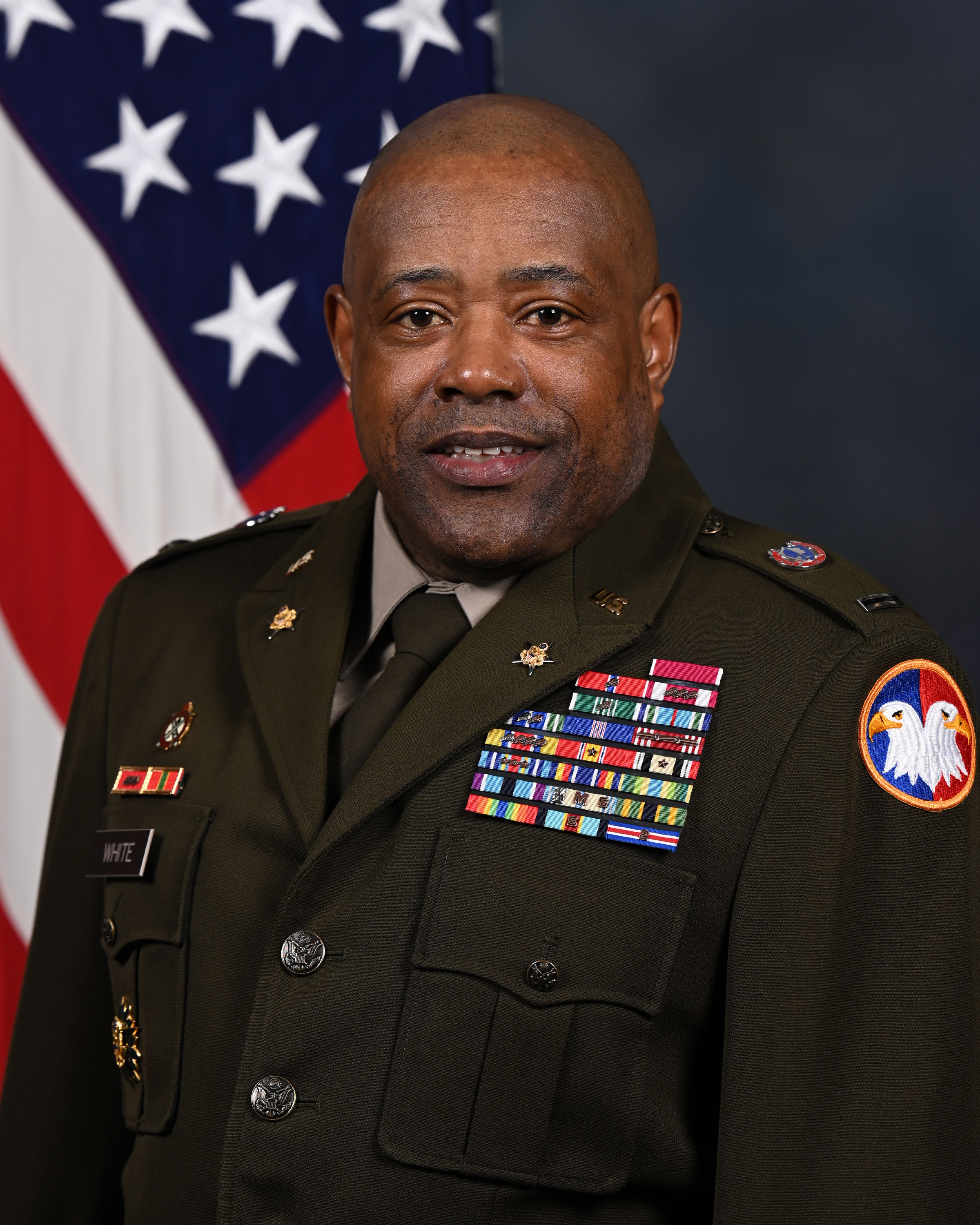
- Incumbent; CW5 LaShon P White since May 3, 2024
- Reports to: Chief of the United States Army Reserve
- Website: https://www.usar.army.mil/Leadership/

The Command Chief Warrant Officer of the US Army Reserve (CCWO USAR) is the most senior warrant officer position in the United States Army Reserve and serves as a key advisor to the commanding general United States Army Reserve on training, readiness, mentorship and professionalism of the warrant officer corps.

== List of Officeholders ==
No.	Portrait	Name	Assumed office	Left office	Ref.
Senior Warrant Officer Advisor to the Commanding General USAR
1					
2					
Command Chief Warrant Officer of the US Army Reserve
3		CW5 David Koch	April 2004	Sept. 10, 2007	
4		CW5 James "Jim" Thompson	Sept. 10, 2007	July 2, 2012	
5		CW5 Phyllis J. Wilson	July 2, 2012	July 2, 2015	
6		CW5 Russell P. Smith	July 2, 2015		
7		CW5 Hal Griffin III	April 2018	March 31, 2021	
8		CW5 Patrick R. Nelligen	March 31, 2021	May 3, 2024	
9		CW5 LaShon P. White	May 3, 2024	Incumbent	

Before 2004 - the position was simply known as the Senior Chief Warrant Officer Advisor to the Commanding General.

== See also ==
- Chief of the United States Army Reserve
- Chief Warrant Officer of the Army
- Command Chief Warrant Officer of the Army National Guard
- Command Chief Master Sergeant, Air Force Reserve Command
- Command Sergeant Major of the US Army Reserve
- Force Master Chief, Navy Reserve Force
- Master Chief Petty Officer of the Coast Guard Reserve Force
