= Phyllis J. Wilson =

American military officer and nonprofit director

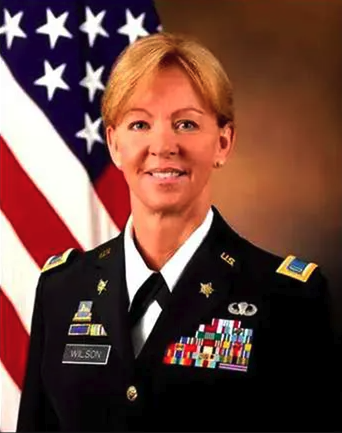
- Wilson in 2012

President of the Military Women's Memorial Foundation
- Incumbent
- Assumed office September 2019

5th Command Chief Warrant Officer of the United States Army Reserve
- In office July 2, 2012 – July 2, 2015
- Preceded by: James Thompson
- Succeeded by: Russell P. Smith

Personal details
- Children: 8
- Education: Excelsior University (BS); Webster University (MS); Defense Language Institute
- Occupation: military intelligence analyst nurse nonprofit executive
- Awards: Defense Meritorious Service Medal; Meritorious Service Medal; Joint Service Commendation Medal; Army Commendation Medal; Joint Service Achievement Medal; Army Achievement Medal, Iraq Campaign Medal; Global War on Terrorism Expeditionary Medal; Global War on Terrorism Service Medal; Parachutist Badge; Legion of Merit; DAR President General's Medallion

Military service
- Allegiance: United States of America
- Branch/service: United States Army
- Years of service: 1981–2018
- Rank: Chief Warrant Officer 5
- Commands: XVIII Airborne Corps
- Battles/wars: Gulf War; Iraq War; Operation Enduring Freedom

Phyllis J. Wilson is an American retired military officer, nurse, and nonprofit executive. She served as the Command Chief Warrant Officer of the United States Army Reserve from 2012 to 2015. Since 2019, she has served as president of the Military Women's Memorial Foundation. Wilson was inducted into the Army Women's Foundation Hall of Fame and the U.S. Veterans Hall of Fame.

== Education ==
Wilson has two bachelor of science degrees, one in nursing and one in sociology and German, from Excelsior University. She also earned three associate of science degrees. She earned a Master of Science degree in management from Webster University. She attended the Defense Language Institute for German and Spanish and graduated from the Defense Strategic Debriefer Course. In 2008, Wilson graduated from the Warrant Officer Senior Staff Course. She completed the program for Advanced Security Studies at the George C. Marshall European Center for Security Studies in Garmisch, Germany in 2009. She also earned a certificate in nonprofit management from Duke University.

== Career ==
=== Army ===
Wilson joined the United States Army as a private on March 25, 1981, and worked as a military intelligence German linguist voice intercept operator. She served for over thirty years in the Army and in the United States Army Reserve, with deployments and posts in Germany, Iraq, and the United States.

In August 1990, Wilson was mobilized to support Operation Desert Storm and served as the Signals Intelligence collection manager for XVIII Airborne Corps at Fort Bragg in North Carolina. In December 2002, she mobilized in support of Operation Enduring Freedom as a senior counter terrorism analyst. She served for six years in the U.S. Special Operations Command at MacDill Air Force Base in Tampa, Florida as an intelligence analyst in support of information operations focusing on the global war on terrorism. She was deployed twice to Iraq in support of a specialized joint special operations task force and was previously assigned to the 533rd Military Intelligence Battalion supporting the 3rd Armored Division in Germany, the 525th Military Intelligence Brigade at Fort Bragg, the 337th Military Intelligence Battalion in Charlotte, North Carolina, the 101st Airborne Division at Fort Campbell in Kentucky, the 323rd Military Intelligence Battalion at Fort Meade in Maryland, and the CENTCOM Army Reserve Element in Tampa. Wilson also served as the chief of mobilization training for Army Reserve Intelligence soldiers at the Military Intelligence Readiness Command at Fort Belvoir in Virginia preparing for deployment during Operation Iraqi Freedom.

On July 2, 2012, she was appointed as the 5th Command Chief Warrant Officer of the US Army Reserve, succeeding James Thompson. In this role, Wilson advised the commanding general of the Army Reserve on training, education, career management, leader development, and warrior transition issues for warrant officers in the Army Reserve. Wilson was also responsible for coordinating policy changes supporting advancing initiatives for the Warrant Officer Corps.

She was appointed by Lloyd Austin, the United States Secretary of Defense under the Biden Administration, to the Reserve Forces Policy Board. She serves on the board of directors for Policy Vets and the Association of the United States Army, where she is also a senior fellow. She serves as the Army Reserve Ambassador for Maryland, which accords her the rights, privileges, and protocol status equivalent to that of a 2-star general officer.

==== Awards, honors, and recognitions ====
Wilson was awarded the Defense Meritorious Service Medal, the Meritorious Service Medal, the Joint Service Commendation Medal, the Army Commendation Medal, the Joint Service Achievement Medal, the Army Achievement Medal, the Iraq Campaign Medal, the Global War on Terrorism Expeditionary Medal, the Global War on Terrorism Service Medal, the Legion of Merit, and the Parachutist Badge.

She was inducted into the Army Women's Foundation Hall of Fame and the U.S. Veterans Hall of Fame. In March 2020, Wilson was named a "Power Player of the Week" by Chris Wallace on Fox News Sunday.

On November 4, 2022, Wilson was honored by Veteran Affairs News as the Veteran of the Day.

In February 2025, Wilson was presented with the Daughter of the American Revolution's President General's Medallion, in recognition of her service and dedication to women veterans, by President General Pamela Rouse Wright. In July 2025, Wilson was inducted into the Honorable Order of the Eagle Rising Society during a ceremony at Fort Rucker, becoming the twenty-seventh person to receive the honor. She was presented the award by retired U.S. Air Force Colonel Jim O'Brien, the executive vice president of the Military Officers Association of America, and Colonel Kevin McHugh, commandant of the Warrant Officer Career College.

=== Military Women's Memorial ===
Wilson serves as the president of the Women in Military Service for America Memorial Foundation, which focuses on honoring the three million women who have served in the United States Armed Forces from the American Revolutionary War to present time.

On June 28, 2025, Wilson spoke during the National Defense Night ceremony of the 134th Continental Congress of the National Society Daughters of the American Revolution at DAR Constitution Hall and presented President General Pamela Rouse Wright with the Military Women's Memorial Foundation's Woman of Valor Award.

=== Civilian ===
Wilson is a registered nurse and served as a director of nursing, a director of clinical operations, a home health and hospice nurse, and worked as a loan officer and as a social worker.

== Personal life ==
Wilson has eight children and four of her sons are combat veterans of the United States Armed Forces.

She is a member of the Daughters of the American Revolution, the Mayflower Society, the American Legion, Veterans of Foreign Affairs, the Military Order of the World Wars, the Association of the United States Army, the Association of the United States Navy, the Women Marines Association, the Reserve Organization of America, Military Women Across the Nation, Army Women Veterans Association, Military Officers Association of America, Disabled American Veterans, the Air Force Association, the United States Army Warrant Officers Association, Women In Defense, and the National Defense Industrial Association.
