= Master Chief Petty Officer of the Coast Guard Reserve Force =

Master Chief Petty Officer of Coast Guard Reserve

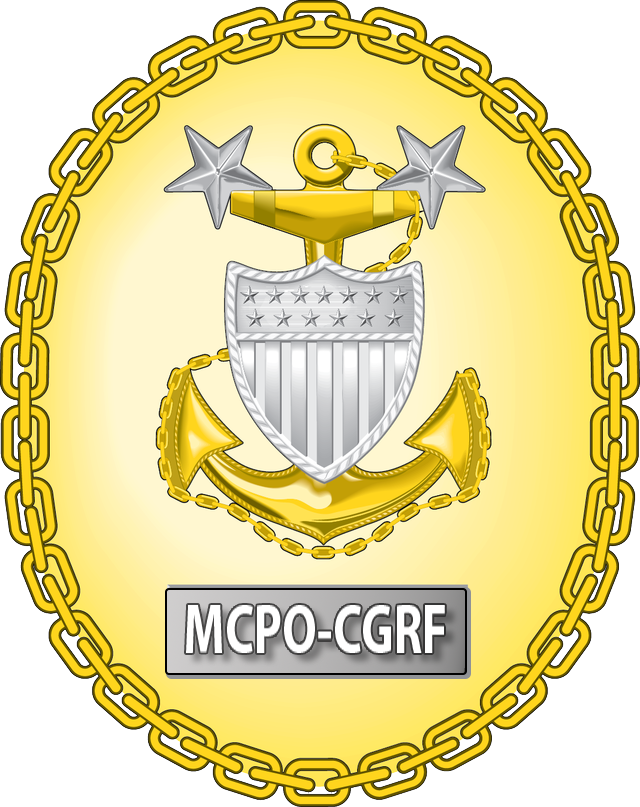
- US COAST GUARD MCPO-CGR BADGE

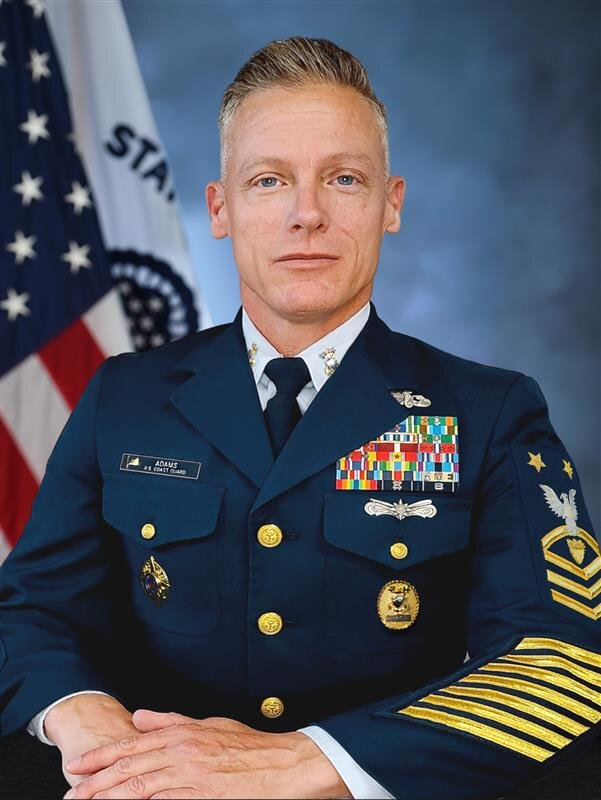
- Incumbent; MCPO-CGR William B. Adams since October 4, 2024
- Abbreviation: MCPO-CGR
- Reports to: Assistant Commandant for the Reserve
- First holder: MCPO-CGRF Forrest W. Croom

The master chief petty officer of the Coast Guard Reserve (MCPO CGR) is a liaison between the Assistant Commandant for the Reserve (CG-R), the Master Chief Petty Officer of the Coast Guard (MCPOCG), and the Coast Guard Commandant’s office. From 1991-2018, the position was called master chief petty officer of the Coast Guard Reserve Fleet (MCPO CGRF).

The MCPO-CGR is chosen by the Vice Commandant, the MCPOCG and Assistant Commandant for the Reserve as a group. The normal tour of assignment is two years.

== List of office holders ==
No.	MCPO-CGRF	Photo	Term start	Term end	Ref.
1	MCPO-CGRF Forrest W. Croom		1991	1994	
2	MCPO-CGRF William C. Phillips		1994		
3	MCPO-CGRF George Ingraham			December 2003	
4	MCPO-CGRF Jeffery D. Smith		December 2003	May 2010	
5	MCPO-CGRF Mark H. Allen		May 2010	May 2014	
6	MCPO-CGRF Eric Johnson		May 2014	May 2018	
	MCPO-CGR				
7	MCPO-CGR George M. Williamson		May 2018	May 2022	
8	MCPO-CGR Timothy A. Beard		May 2022	October 4, 2024	
9	MCPO-CGR William B. Adams		October 4, 2024	Present	

== See also ==
- Command Chief Master Sergeant, Air Force Reserve Command
- Command Sergeant Major of the US Army Reserve
- Force Master Chief, Navy Reserve Force
- Command Chief Warrant Officer of the US Army Reserve
