= Command Sergeant Major of the US Army Reserve =

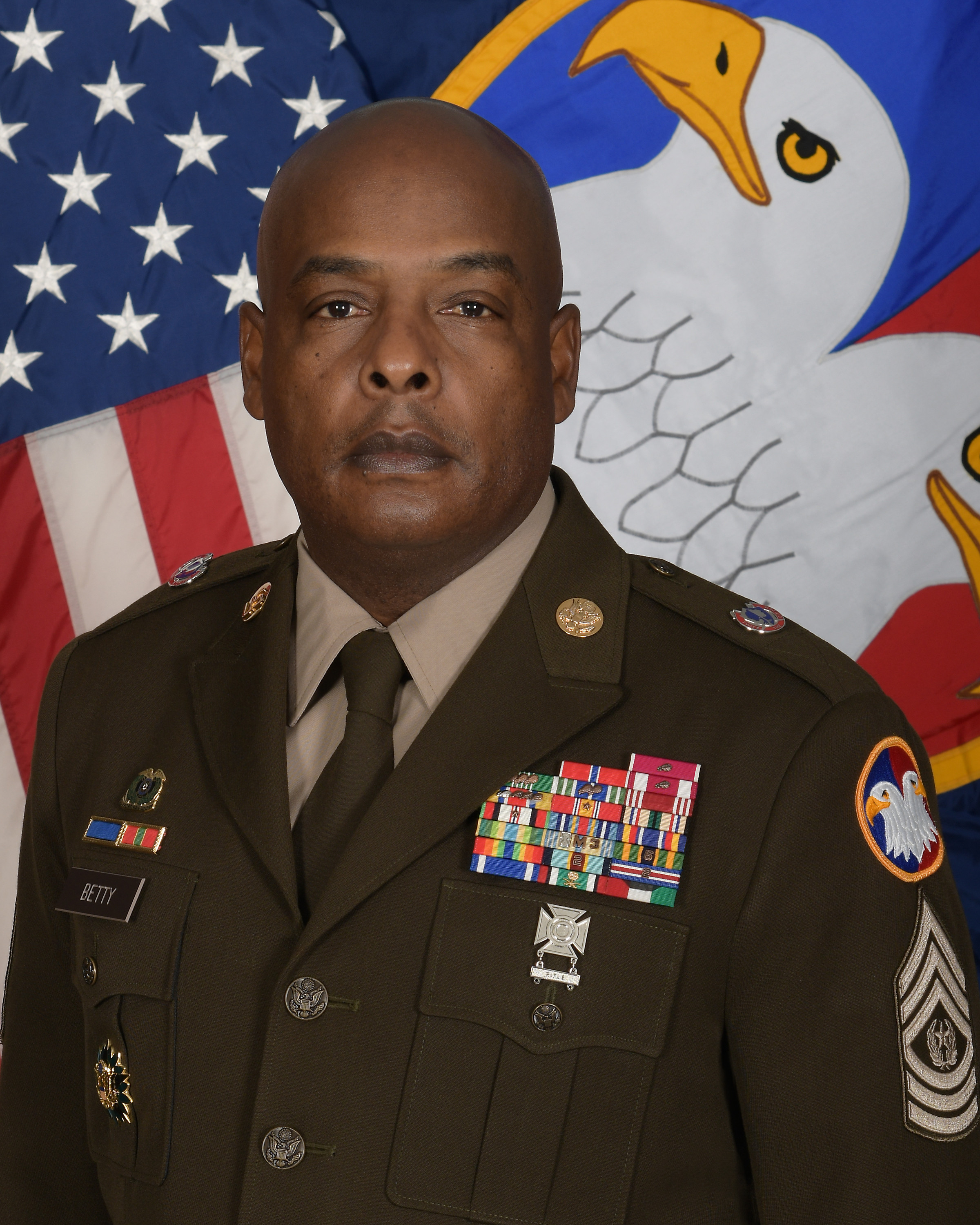
- Incumbent; CSM Gregory Betty since March 20, 2024
- Reports to: Chief of the United States Army Reserve

The Command Sergeant Major of the U.S. Army Reserve Command is the principal enlisted advisor to the Commanding General, U.S. Army Reserve Command on regulations, policies and quality of life issues for the enlisted soldiers of the US Army Reserve.

== List of Officeholders ==
No.	Portrait	Name	Assumed office	Left office	Ref.
Senior Enlisted Advisor to the Chief of Army Reserve
1		SGM William R. Foley (SEA USAR)	May 1975	September 1977	
2		CSM Donald J. Columbo (CSM USAR / SEA)	September 1977	June 1982	
3/1		CSM Cornelius Boykin* (CSM USAR / SEA)	June 1980	September 1985	
4/2		CSM Edward C. Reilly (SEA USAR)	September 1985	August 1986	
5/3		CSM Douglas E. Murray CSM USAR/ SEA)	December 1986	August 1991	
6 / 4		CSM Collin L. Younger (CSM USAR / CSM USARC)	August 1991	April 1996	
Senior Noncommissioned Officer in the U.S. Army Reserve and Senior Enlisted Advisor
5		CSM John E. "Jack" Rucynski* (CSM USAR/CSM USARC/SEA)	January 1996	January 2000	
Command Sergeant Major of the US Army Reserve Command (CSM USARC) or Command Sergeant Major for the Office, Chief of Army Reserve (CSM OCAR)
6		CSM Frank Spangler** (CSM USARC)	August 15, 1998	July 1, 2002	
7		CSM Alex Ray Lackey** (CSM USAR/SEA)	Dec 1999	October 2002	
8		CSM Michelle S. Jones** (OCAR)	October 2002	June 2006	
9		CSM Nicholas A. Piacentini, Jr.** (CSM USARC)	July 1, 2002	August 29, 2006	
Command Sergeant Major of the Army Reserve
10		CSM Leon Caffie (CSM USAR/SEA)	August 29, 2006	March 17, 2010	
11		CSM Michael D Schultz (CSM USAR/SEA)	March 17, 2010	January 2012	
--		CSM James Lambert (Interim CSM USAR))	January 2012	March 7, 2013	
12		CSM Luther Thomas, Jr. (CSM USAR/SEA)	March 7, 2013	January 2016	
--		CSM James P. Willis (Interim CSM USAR))	January 2016	March 8, 2017	
13		CSM Ted L. Copeland (CSM USAR\SEA)	March 8, 2017	June 29, 2020	
14		CSM Andrew Lombardo (CSM USAR/SEA)	June 29, 2020	March 20, 2024	
15		CSM Gregory Betty (CSM USAR/SEA)	March 20, 2024	Incumbent	

- (SEA) Senior Noncommissioned Officer in the U.S. Army Reserve and Senior Enlisted Advisor
- (SGM USAR) Sergeant Major of the Army Reserve
- (CSM USAR) Command Sergeant Major of the Army Reserve
- **From 1998-2006 there were two CSM of the USAR, one for the Office of the Chief of Army Reserve (OCAR) and one for the Pentagon as advisor to the Chief of the US Army Reserve Command (USARC)

== See also ==
- Command Chief Master Sergeant, Air Force Reserve Command
- Force Master Chief, Navy Reserve Force
- Master Chief Petty Officer of the Coast Guard Reserve Force
- Command Chief Warrant Officer of the US Army Reserve
- Chief of the United States Army Reserve
