= Command Chief Master Sergeant, Air Force Reserve Command =

Command Chief Master Sergeant of Air Force Reserve Command of US Air Force Reserve Command

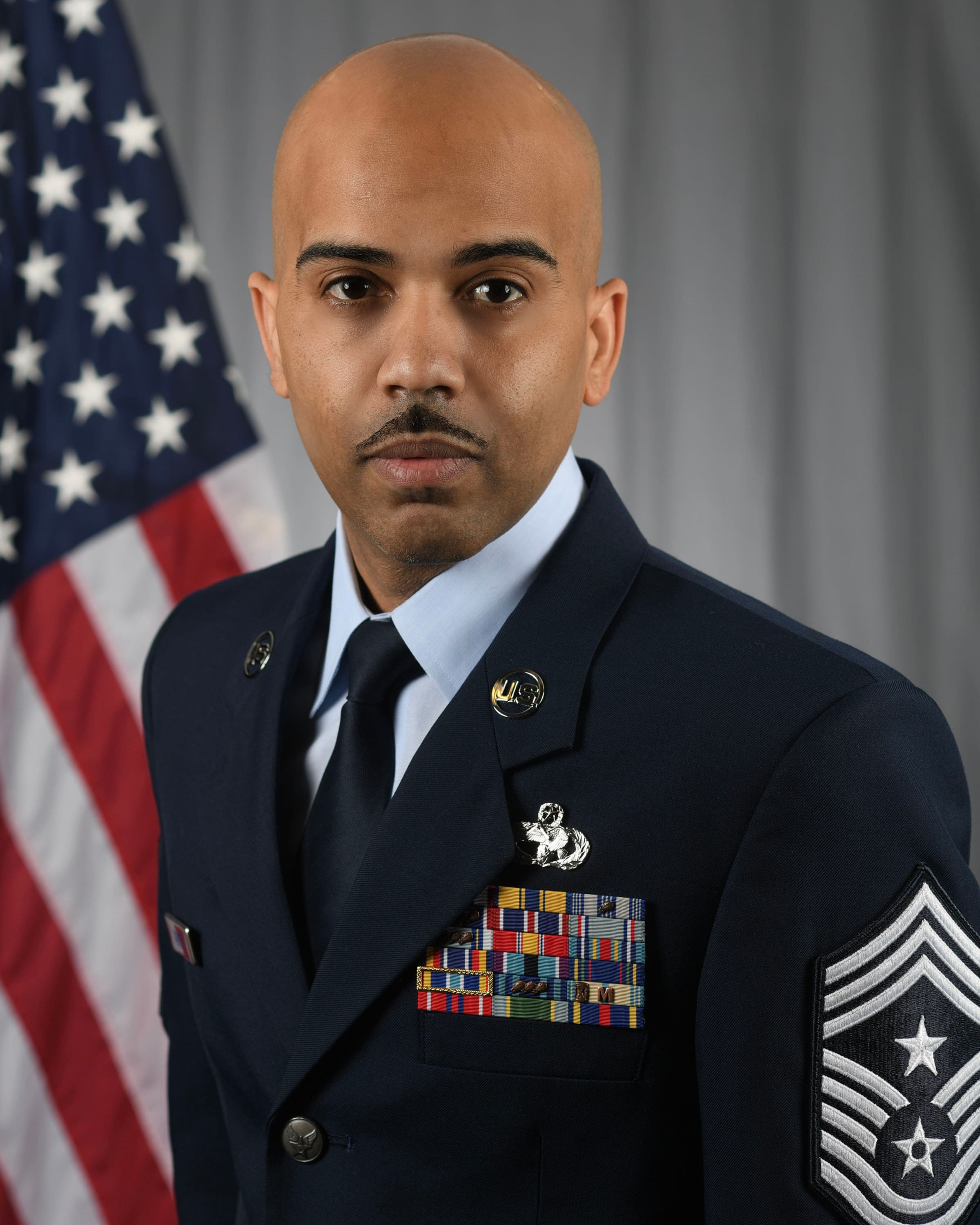
- Incumbent; CMSgt Israel Nuñez since May 2023
- Reports to: Chief of the Air Force Reserve Command
- First holder: CMSgt. Rober I. Boyle as Senior Enlisted Advisor to the Chief of Air Force Reserve

The Command Chief Master Sergeant of Air Force Reserve Command (AFRC) is the Senior Enlisted Advisor to the Chief of Air Force Reserve who provides advice to the chief about the enlisted airmen of the AFRC. His/her primary focus is the welfare, morale, discipline, operational readiness and mission readiness of the AFRC airmen. Prior to December of 1998, the position was called the Senior Enlisted Advisor to the Chief of the Air Force Reserves (AFRES) and continues that earlier title as a part of their current role.

Command Chief Master Sergeants of Air Force Reserve Command
No.	Image	Name	Took office	Left office	Ref.
Senior Enlisted Advisor to the Chief of the Air Force Reserves (AFRES)
1		CMSgt. Robert I. Boyle	March 1973	March 1975	
2		CMSgt. Olin B. Colwell	March 1975	September 1977	
3		CMSgt. Jackie R. Farley	October 1977	October 1979	
4		CMSgt. Jack E. Roberts	November 1979	February 1982	
5		CMSgt. Henry J. Scott	February 1982	May 1986	
6		CMSgt Richard E. Russell	May 1986	July 1988	
7		CMSgt Charles F. Joseph	July 1988	August 1991	
8		CMSgt. James A. Rossi	August 1991	September 1995	
9		CMSgt. Carol A. Smits	October 1995	December 1998	
Command Chief Master Sergeant of Air Force Reserve Command (AFRC)
		Command Chief Master Sgt. Carol A. Smits	December 1998	January 1999	
10		Command Chief Master Sgt. Billy Blackburn	January 1999	November 2000	
11		Command Chief Master Sgt. Cheryl D. Adams	February 2001	November 2004	
12		Command Chief Master Sgt. Jackson Winsett	November 2004	March 2007	
13		Command Chief Master Sgt. Troy McIntosh	March 2007	June 2009	
14		Command Chief Master Sgt. Dwight Badgett	June 2009	January 2012	
15		Command Chief Master Sgt. Kathleen Buckner	January 2012	May 2013	
16		Command Chief Master Sgt. Cameron B. Kirksey	May 2013	March 2016	
17		Command Chief Master Sergeant Ericka Kelly	March 2016	April 2019	
18		Command Chief Master Sgt. Timothy C. White Jr	April 2019	May 2023	
19		Command Chief Master Sgt. Israel Nunez	May 2023	incumbent	

== See also ==
- Command Sergeant Major of the US Army Reserve
- Force Master Chief, Navy Reserve Force
- Master Chief Petty Officer of the Coast Guard Reserve Force
- Command Chief Warrant Officer of the US Army Reserve
