= Command Chief Warrant Officer of the Army National Guard =

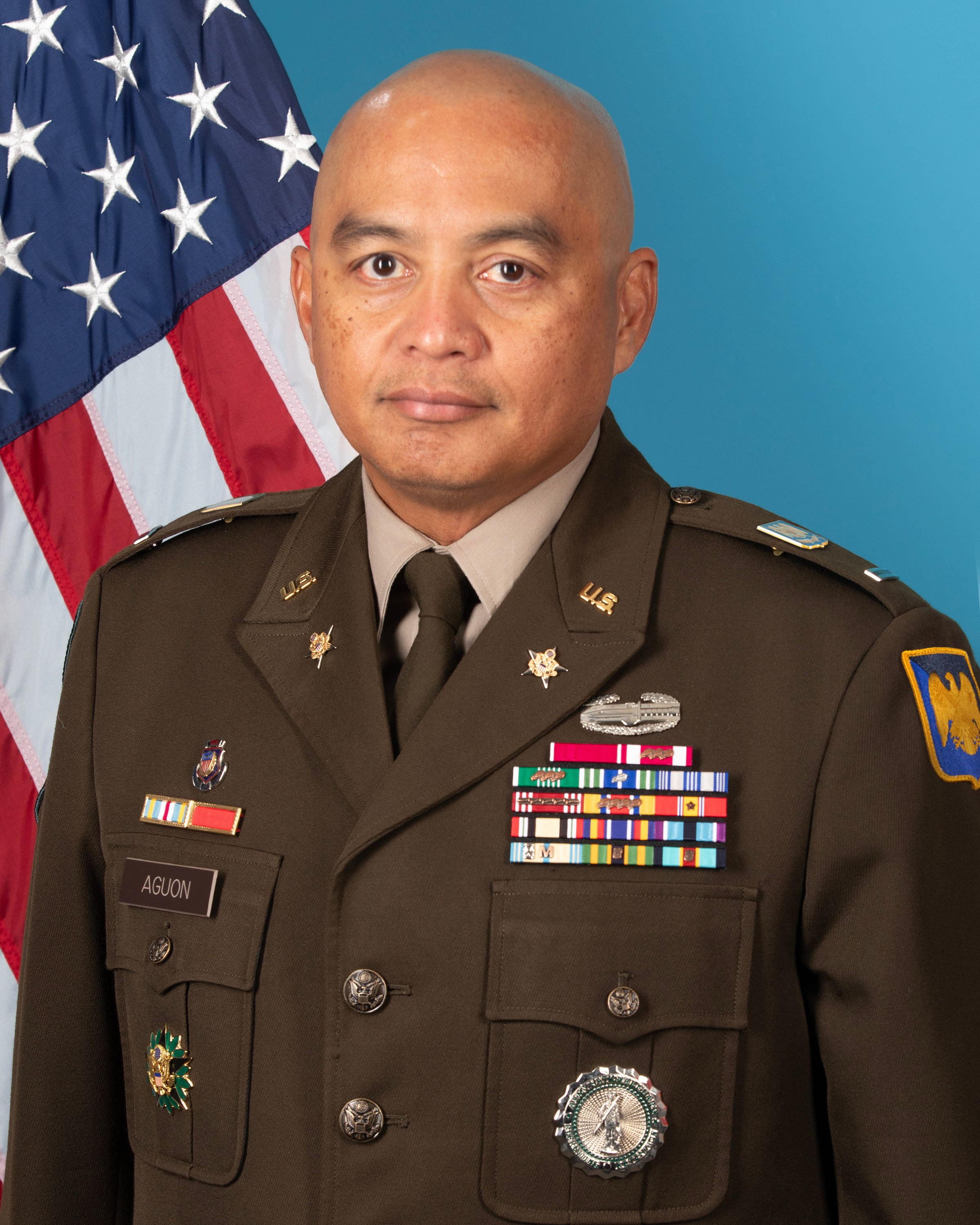
- Incumbent; CW5 Bernard Aguon since October 2025
- Reports to: Director, Army National Guard
- Website: https://www.nationalguard.mil/

The Command Chief Warrant Officer of the US Army National Guard (CCWO ARNG) is the most senior warrant officer position in the United States Army National Guard and serves as a key advisor to the director Army National Guard on training, readiness, mentorship and professionalism of the warrant officer corps.

== List of Officeholders ==
No.	Portrait	Name	Assumed office	Left office	Ref.
1		CW5 Robert J. Wharton	December 2000	2004	
2		CW5 Poyas M. Haynes	2004	January 2007	
		CW5 Sal Green (Interim)	January 2007	September 2007	
3		CW5 Tom O'Sullivan	September 2007	February 2010	
4		CW5 Gary R. Nisker	February 2010	October 2012	
5		CW5 Gary Ensminger	October 2012	February 2015	
6		CW5 Peter T. Panos	February 2015	June 2018	
7		CW5 Teresa A. Domeier	June 2018	January 2023	
8		CW5 Brian Searcy	January 2023	October 2025	
9		CW5 Bernard Aguon	October 2025	incumbent	

== See also ==
- Chief of the National Guard Bureau
- Vice Chief of the National Guard Bureau
- Senior Enlisted Advisor to the Chief of the National Guard Bureau
- Chief Warrant Officer of the Army
- Command Chief Warrant Officer of the US Army Reserve
- Command Chief Master Sergeant, Air National Guard
- Command Sergeant Major of the Army National Guard
