= Brian Searcy =

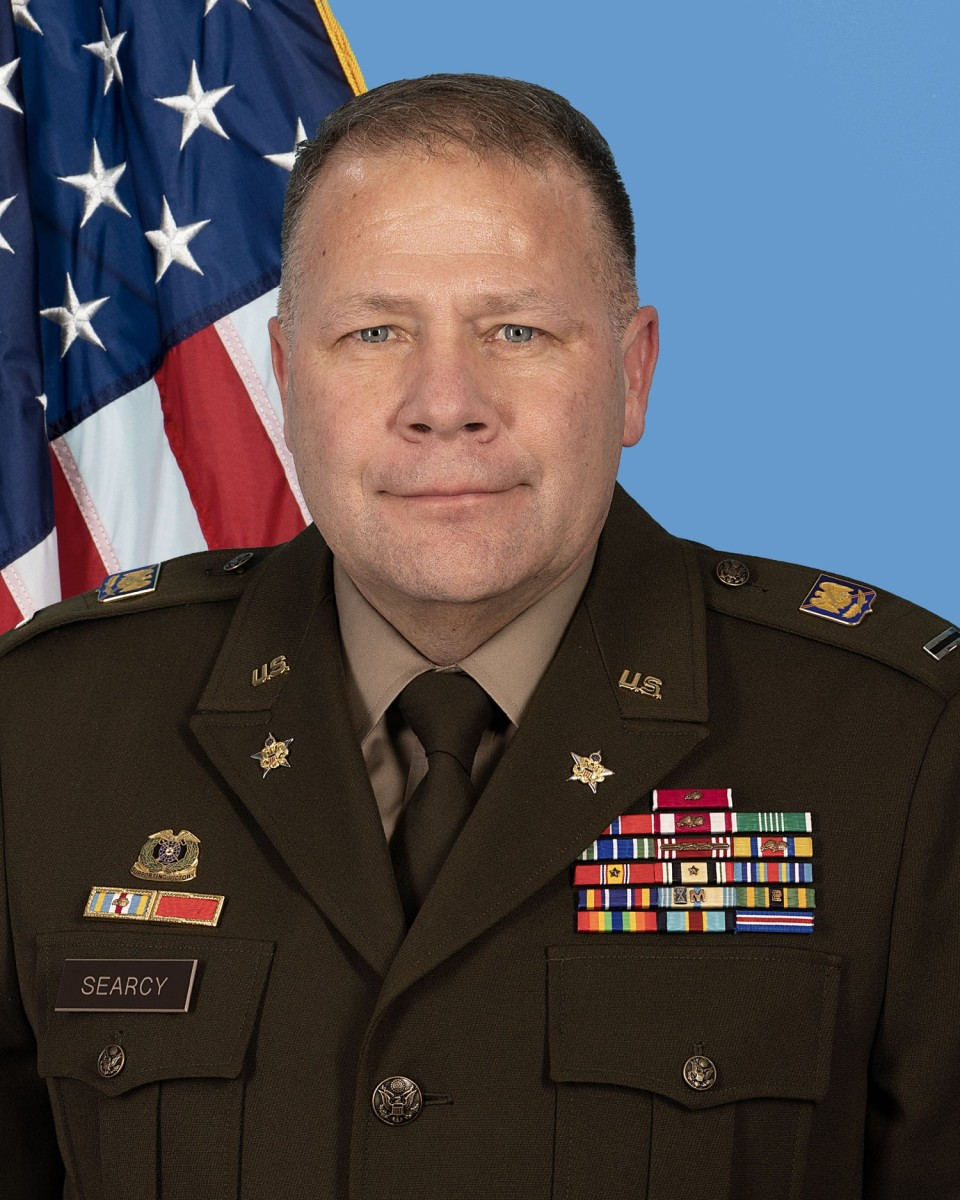
CW5 Brian Searcy Command Chief Warrant Officer of the Army National Guard

Chief Warrant Officer Five Brian Searcy is the 8th command chief warrant officer of the Army National Guard and is the primary military advisor to the Director of the Army National Guard on warrant officer training, implementation, readiness, and professional development.

He enlisted in the Utah Army National Guard on Jan. 20, 1988, as a cannon crew member (13B) in Service Battery, 222nd Field Artillery Regiment. In 1992 he reclassified as an interrogator and Spanish linguist (35M) and transferred to D Company, 142nd Military Intelligence Battalion, as a section sergeant. In 1995 he began serving with the Utah National Guard Counterdrug Program.

In 1999 he transferred to C Company, 141st Military Intelligence Battalion and was appointed to the rank of warrant officer one after completing Warrant Officer Candidate School (WOCS). He deployed in 2003 with the 141st Military Intelligence Battalion, Forward 1 in Iraq.

In 2018, he was appointed as the command chief warrant officer of the Utah Army Guard. In 2023, Searcy became the command chief warrant officer of the ARNG.

CW5 Searcy is married to Caroline Searcy and has three children.

== Awards and decorations ==
- Legion of Merit with oak leaf cluster
- Bronze Star Medal
- Meritorious Service Medal with two oak leaf clusters
- Army Commendation Medal
- Army Achievement Medal
- Army Good Conduct Medal with three knots device
- Army Reserve Components Achievement Medal - National Guard with two oak leaf clusters
- National Defense Service Medal with star
- Iraq Campaign Medal with campaign star
- Global War on Terrorism Expeditionary Medal
- Global War on Terrorism Service Medal
- Armed Forces Reserve Medal with Silver Hourglass and Mobilization device
- Army NCO Professional Development Ribbon with number 2
- Army Service Ribbon
- Army Overseas Service Ribbon
- Army Reserve Components Overseas Training Ribbon
