= Global War on Terrorism Service Medal =

American service medal

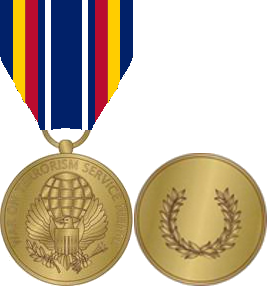
- Obverse and reverse
- Type: Military medal Service medal
- Awarded for: Support of operations to counter terrorism, whether stationed in the United States or overseas.
- Presented by: the U.S. Department of Defense; U.S. Department of Homeland Security
- Eligibility: U.S. military personnel
- Status: Active
- Established: E.O. 13289, 12 March 2003; 23 years ago
- First award: 2003 (retroactive to 11 September 2001)
- Service ribbon and campaign streamer

Precedence
- Next (higher): Global War on Terrorism Expeditionary Medal
- Next (lower): Korea Defense Service Medal
- Related: National Defense Service Medal, Secretary of Defense Medal for the Global War on Terrorism, Global War on Terrorism Expeditionary Medal

The Global War on Terrorism Service Medal (GWOT-SM) is a military award of the United States Armed Forces which was created through Executive Order 13289 on 12 March 2003, by President George W. Bush. The medal recognizes those military service members who have supported operations to counter terrorism in the war on terror from 11 September 2001, to a date yet to be determined.

From its creation in March 2003 through September 2022, the GWOT-SM was a quasi-automatically awarded medal similar to the National Defense Service Medal (NDSM). The GWOT-SM was awarded for the broadly defined criterion of "support duty" to most servicemembers after thirty days of post-entry training active service up until around January to February 2015. After that point, it was no longer awarded for just completing basic training and required specific participation in designated operations in support of the Global War on Terrorism. However, since 11 September 2022, the GWOT-SM is now awarded to servicemembers only serving in the area of effect for approved campaigns related to the Global War on Terrorism.

== Background ==
In September 2002, the U.S. Department of Defense sent a request to the U.S. Army Institute of Heraldry to provide a design for a Global War on Terrorism Service Medal. In January 2003, a design was completed, which was then approved and made official in March 2003.

According to the U.S. Department of Defense, the Global War on Terrorism Service Medal will cease being awarded when Presidential Proclamation 7463, "Declaration of National Emergency by Reason of Certain Terrorist Attacks", delivered on 14 September 2001, is terminated by the U.S. government. It has generally been extended on an annual basis. For example, it was extended in 2022 by President Biden until 2023. The most recent extension was declared by President Trump on 29 August 2025, extending the state of emergency another year, until at least 14 September 2026.

== Operations ==
The following are the approved operations for the Global War on Terrorism Service Medal:

Note: Enduring Freedom name is still in operational use today for deployments to the Middle East, OEF encompasses Operation JUNIPER SHIELD, OCTAVE SHIELD and SPARTAN SHIELD.

Operation	From	To
Airport Security Operations (ASO)	27 September 2001	31 May 2002
Noble Eagle (ONE)	11 September 2001	TBD
Enduring Freedom (OEF)	11 September 2001	TBD
Iraqi Freedom (OIF)	19 March 2003	31 August 2010
New Dawn (OND)	1 September 2010	31 December 2011
Observant Compass (OOC)	1 October 2011	30 September 2017
US Africa Command Counter Terrorism Executive Order	6 September 2012	TBD
Inherent Resolve (OIR)	15 June 2014	TBD
Freedom's Sentinel (OFS)	1 January 2015	30 August 2021
Odyssey Lightning (OOL)	1 August 2016	17 January 2017
Operation Pacific Eagle (OPE-P)	5 October 2017	TBD
Operation Enduring Sentinel	1 September 2021	TBD
Prosperity Guardian	18 December 2023	TBD
Poseidon Archer	11 January 2024	TBD
Pandora Throttle	13 May 2024	TBD

The Coast Guard awards the medal for different operations (qv).

== Criteria ==
To receive the Global War on Terrorism Service Medal, a military service member must have served on active duty during a designated anti-terrorism operation for a minimum 30 consecutive or 60 non-consecutive days. For those who were engaged in combat, killed, or wounded in the line of duty the time requirement is waived. By July 2022, the Department of Defense updated the criteria to remove this requirement, and instead awarding it to servicemembers who were deployed to approved campaigns or within 12 miles (19 km) of a country's shoreline where an ongoing campaign is being undertaken.

The initial authorized operation for the Global War on Terrorism Service Medal was the so-called "Airport Security Operation" which occurred between 27 September 2001 and 31 May 2002. Additional operations, for which the Global War on Terrorism Service Medal is authorized, include the active military campaigns of Operation Enduring Freedom, Operation Noble Eagle, and Operation Iraqi Freedom. Future operations are at the discretion of United States component commanders upon approval from the United States Department of Defense.

=== Support duty ===
In 2004, Defense Department and military service branches began publishing directives, messages, and orders, specifying that the Global War on Terrorism Service Medal would be awarded not only for direct participation in specific operations, but also to any personnel who performed support duty of an anti-terrorism operation but did not directly participate. The phrase "support" was further defined as any administrative, logistics, planning, operational, technical, or readiness activity, which provides support to an operation of the Global War on Terrorism. As a result of this blanket term, the Global War on Terrorism Service Medal became an eligible award for most personnel of the United States Armed Forces who performed service after 11 September 2001.

With the orders granting the GWOT-SM for broadly defined "support duty", awarding of the medal essentially became practically automatic, akin to being a similar type of award as the National Defense Service Medal, which was also automatically granted to every member of the U.S. Armed Forces from 11 September 2001 until 31 December 2022 (graduates of training schools, ROTC, and service academies were typically presented both awards at the same time). The primary difference between the NDSM and the GWOT-SM is that the NDSM was automatic as soon as a person joined the military, whereas the GWOTSM was only to be presented after thirty days of active duty in a unit (or three months in the case of the Reserve Component). The regulations for Reservists and National Guardsmen are also not as well defined for the GWOT-SM as they are for the NDSM, since the presentation of the NDSM to reservists and National Guardsmen was codified and clarified as far back as the Persian Gulf War. Widely called the ''support'' loophole, the Department of Defense rescinded this eligibility criteria and sharply restricted the award of the Global War on Terrorism Service Medal beginning 11 September 2022 (the period for the award of the NDSM also came to an end in December the same year).

=== Army ===
The U.S. Army's regulations state that all soldiers "on active duty, including Reserve Component Soldiers mobilized, or Army National Guard Soldiers activated on or after 11 September 2001 to a date to be determined having served 30 consecutive days or 60 nonconsecutive days are authorized the GWOTSM."

The GWOT-SM was awarded automatically to all service members on Active Duty between 11 September 2001 and 31 March 2004. While the award is no longer automatic, the termination "date to be determined" has not been set. The Battalion Commander is the approval authority for the GWOT-SM. Service members are still eligible for the medal provided they meet the criteria in AR 600-8-22.

U.S. Army soldiers serving on active duty primarily in a training status (basic training, advanced individual training, officer training courses, etc....) are not authorized award of the GWOT-SM for the active duty time they are in training. The criteria for the awards specifically states that a Soldier has to serve on active duty in support of a designated GWOT operation (Operation Noble Eagle [ONE], Operation Enduring Freedom [OEF], Operation Iraqi Freedom [OIF], Operation New Dawn [OND], Operation Inherent Resolve [OIR], and Operation Freedom's Sentinel [OFS]) for 30 consecutive days or 60 nonconsecutive days. Army soldiers in a training status are not considered to be supporting these designated operations.

=== Navy, Marine Corps, and Military Sealift Command ===
Regulations for rating the GWOT-SM are the same in the Navy, the Marine Corps, and Military Sealift Command for those who serve on both active duty, reserve duty, and support. Essentially, 30 days of consecutive duty or 60 days of non-consecutive duty in support of approved organizations. Eligibility begins when they reach their first permanent duty station. Civilian Mariners (CIVMARs) attached to Military Sealift Command's supply ships may be eligible for the Global War on Terrorism Civilian Service Medal.

As of 11 September 2022, the Marine Corps will be limiting the award of the GWOT-SM to "service members who directly serve in a designated military counter-terrorism (CT) operation (e.g., deployed on orders for a designated CT operation; directly supported a designated CT operation on a full-time basis while assigned to an organization conducting such a CT operation) for a minimum of 30 days (consecutive or non-consecutive)."

=== Air Force ===
Air Force service members were first awarded the GWOT-SM for conducting airport security operations in the fall and winter of 2001. It was subsequently awarded for participation or support of Operations Noble Eagle, Enduring Freedom, and Iraqi Freedom. Members must be assigned, attached or mobilized to a unit participating in or serving in support of these designated operations for thirty consecutive days or sixty nonconsecutive days. Personnel who are not deployed may be eligible for service in support of the Global War on Terrorism. Examples of these duties are maintaining and loading weapons systems for combat missions, securing installations against terrorism, augmenting command posts or crisis action teams, and processing personnel for deployment.

=== Coast Guard ===
Coast Guard regulations concerning the award of the GWOT-SM, "From 11 September 2001 to 30 January 2005": Awarded to all Coast Guard active duty and reserve members on active duty during the eligibility period. To qualify, members must have served on active duty for a period of not less than 30 consecutive days or 60 non-consecutive days following initial accession point training. Service while assigned to training duty as a student, cadet, officer candidate, and duty under instruction (DUINS), does not count toward eligibility. This includes both training and summer cruises for the U.S. Coast Guard Academy and Officer Candidate School. For reservists, "active duty" includes ADT and IDT service in an operational vice classroom setting.

From 31 January 2005 to a date to be determined: Eligible service members must be or have been assigned, attached, or mobilized to a unit participating in or serving in direct support of specified Global War on Terrorism operations (e.g., NOBLE EAGLE, LIBERTY SHIELD, NEPTUNE SHIELD, PORT SHIELD, ENDURING FREEDOM, IRAQI FREEDOM, or Area Commander-designated GWOT operations) for 30 consecutive or 60 cumulative days, or meet one of the following criteria: (a) Be engaged in actual combat regardless of time served in the operation; or (b) While participating in the operation, regardless of time, be killed, wounded, or injured requiring medical evacuation."

== Appearance ==
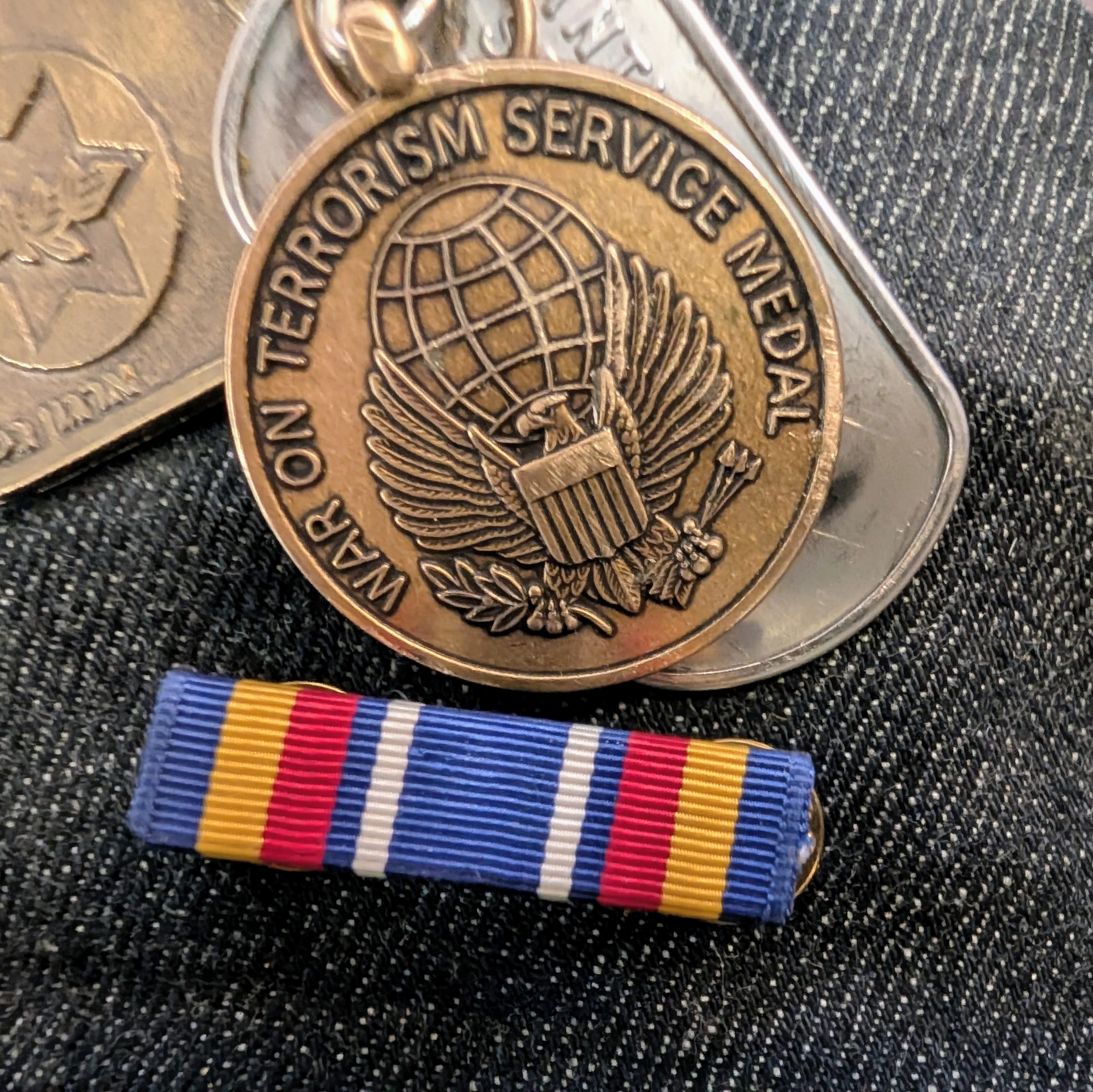
US Global War on Terrorism Service Medal Removed from Ribbon, Issued 2004

The medal is a bronze color metal disc 1 1/4 inches (32 mm) in diameter. The obverse depicts an eagle with spread wings. On the breast of the eagle is a shield of thirteen vertical bars. In the eagle's right claw is an olive branch, and in the left claw are three arrows. The eagle is surmounted by a terrestrial globe with the inscription above "WAR ON TERRORISM SERVICE MEDAL". On the reverse is a laurel wreath on a plain field.

The medal is suspended from an Old Glory Blue ribbon 1 3/8 inches (35 mm) wide with stripes of golden yellow, scarlet, and white.

== Devices ==
Only one award of this medal may be authorized for any individual, thus no bronze or silver 3/16 inch service stars are prescribed for second or subsequent awards.

Battle stars

Although qualifying circumstances would be extremely rare, bronze 3/16 inch battle stars were applicable for personnel who were engaged in actual combat against the enemy involving grave danger of death or serious bodily injury. Only a Combatant Command could initiate a request for a GWOT-SM (or Global War on Terrorism Expeditionary Medal) battle star. This request would have contained the specific unit(s) or individual(s) engaged in actual combat, the duration for which combat was sustained, and a detailed description of the actions against the enemy. The Chairman of the Joint Chiefs of Staff was the approving authority for the specific battle stars.

To date, there have been no battle stars authorized for the Global War on Terrorism Service Medal. The Military Decorations and Awards Review Results released in January 2016 resolved to "eliminate authority for battle stars" in regard to the GWOT-SM.

== Notable recipients ==
- Michael Guetlein, United States Space Force four-star general and 2nd vice chief of space operations from 2023 to 2025, currently serving as program manager of the Golden Dome initiative
- Phyllis J. Wilson, 5th Command Chief Warrant Officer of the United States Army Reserve

== See also ==
- Awards and decorations of the United States military
- Afghanistan Campaign Medal
- Iraq Campaign Medal
- Global War on Terrorism Expeditionary Medal
