= Kyle J. Gillam =

American major and commander

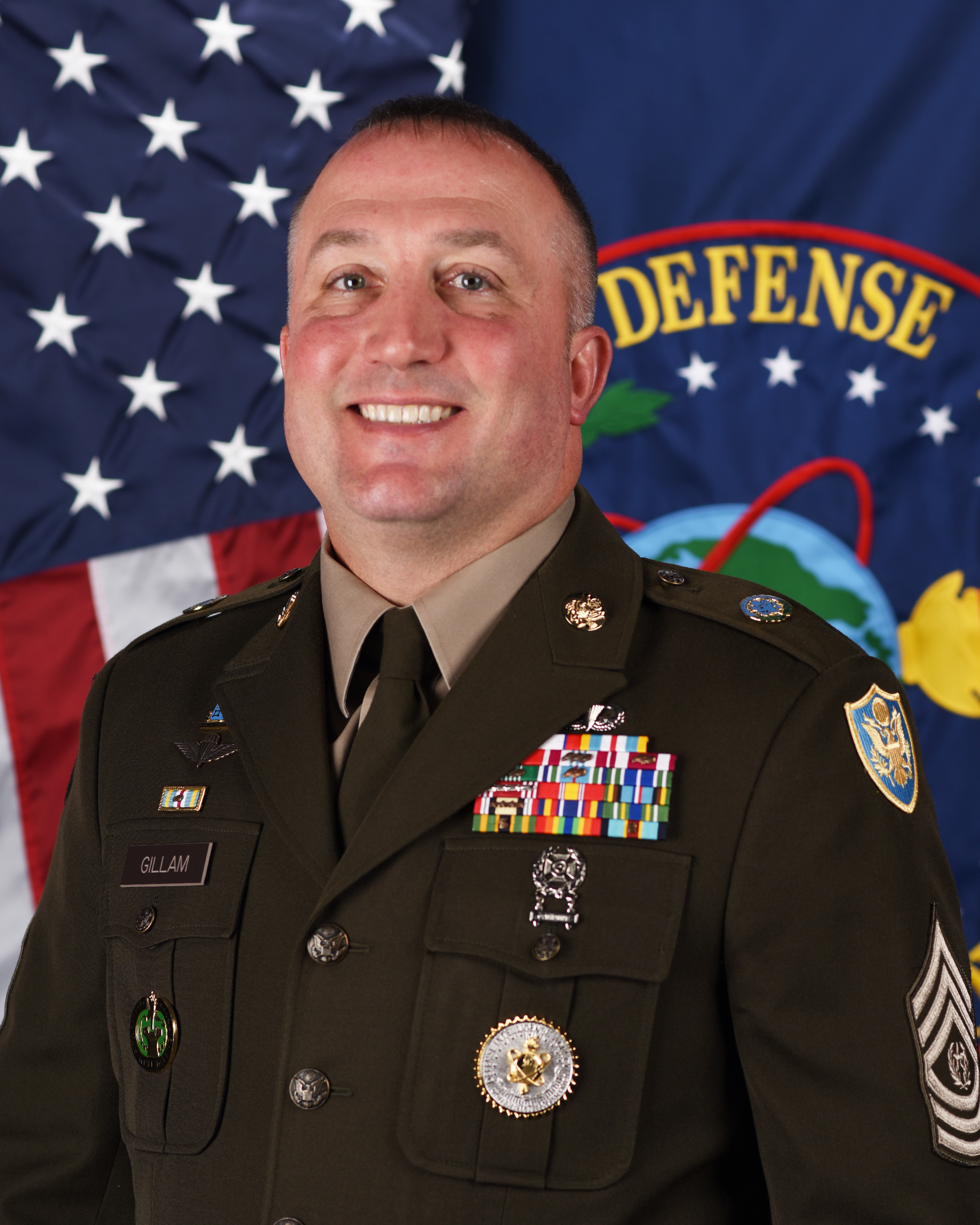
- Born: Lafayette, Indiana, U.S.
- Education: American Military University (B. A.)
- Military career
- Allegiance: United States
- Branch: United States Army
- Service years: 1996–present
- Rank: Major
- Unit: 706th Military Intelligence Group Command

Major Kyle J. Gillam is an American commander who currently serves as the Commander Senior Enlisted Leader of the Defense Intelligence Agency, having done so since 2024. He previously served as an analyst in the 1990s.

== Life and education ==
Gilliam was born in Lafayette, Indiana. He graduated from the American Military University with a Bachelor of Arts in Business Management.

== Service ==
Gilliam joined the U.S. Army in 1996 as a Intelligence Analyst, and was trained in Jacksonville, North Carolina and then Fort Huachuca, Arizona. He later served in the 706th Military Intelligence Group Command unit. In 2024, he was appointed as the Commander Senior Enlisted Leader of the Defense Intelligence Agency.
