= Command Sergeant Major of the Army National Guard =

Advisor in the US Army National Guard

Command Sergeant Major of the Army National Guard of US Army National Guard

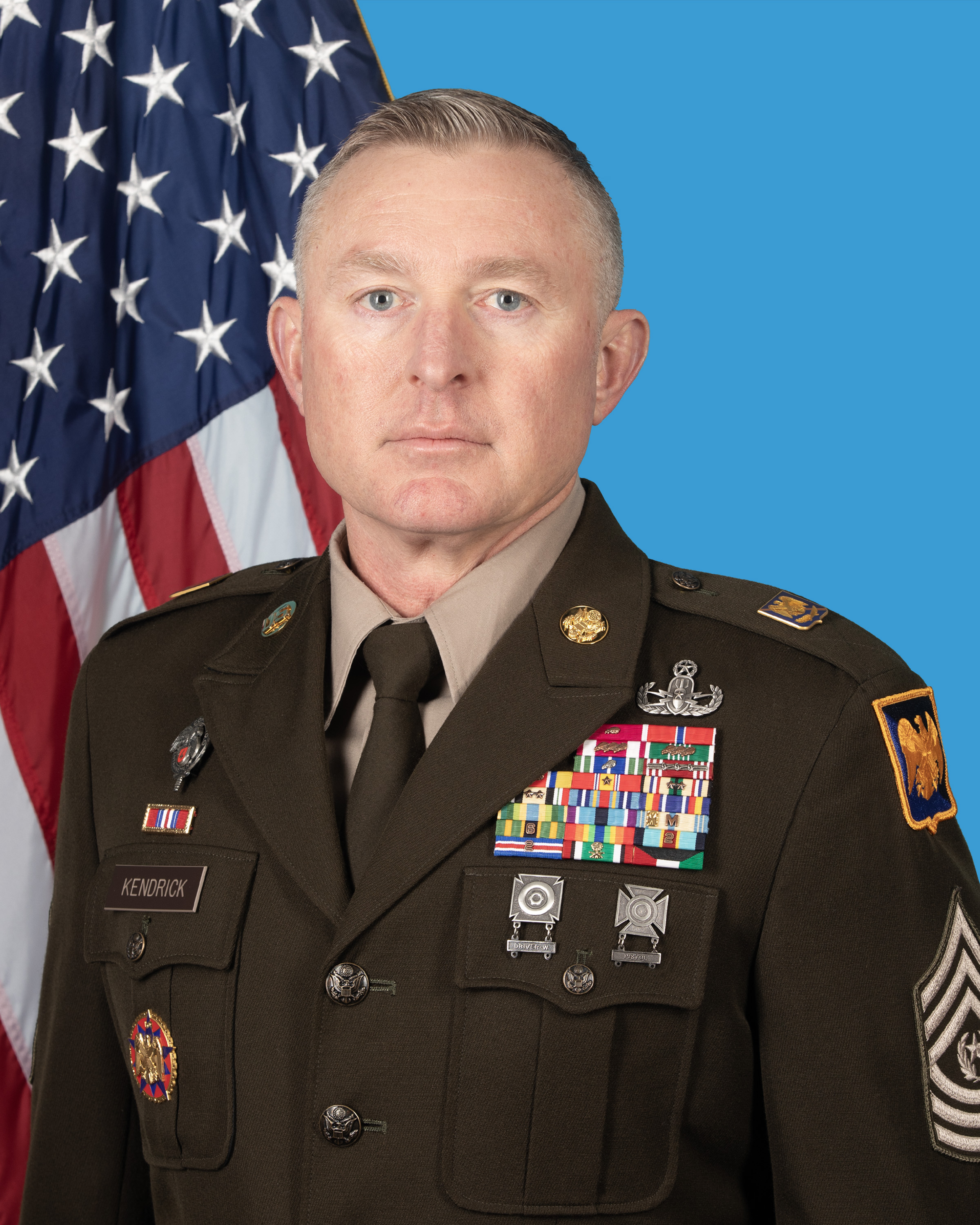
- Incumbent; CSM James B. Kendrick since February 2025
- Reports to: Director, US Army National Guard
- First holder: CSM Albright Hunt

The Command Sergeant Major of the Army National Guard is the principal advisor to the Director, Army National Guard (DARNG) on enlisted soldiers and provides the enlisted perspective to the director on soldier's quality of life and training. He is responsible for mentoring enlisted soldiers on the mission, vision, core values, enlisted utilization, and policy implementation of the Army National Guard. The CSMARNG travels to many schools and training centers often spending 270 days a year on TDY - temporary duty while traveling.

No.	Portrait	Name	Assumed office	Left office	Ref.
1		CSM Albright Hunt	June 1976	June 1978	
2		CSM Donal R. Ingram	June 1978	June 1985	
3		CSM David E Fox	June 1985	May 1988	
4		CSM George S. Blackwood	May 1988	January 1994	
5		CSM Larry D. Pence	January 1994	January 1997	
6		CSM John J. Leonard	January 1997	November 2000	
7		CSM Frank A Lever III	November 2000	June 2005	
8		CSM John D. Gipe	June 2005	July 2009	
9		CSM Richard J. Burch	February 2010	September 2012	
10		CSM Brunk W. Conley	September 2012	May 2016	
11		CSM Christopher S. Kepner	May 2016	February 2018	
12		CSM John F. Sampa	February 2018	February 2022	
13		CSM John T. Raines	February 2022	February 2025	
14		CSM James B. Kendrick	February 2025	incumbent	

== See also ==
- Command Chief Master Sergeant, Air National Guard
- Command Chief Warrant Officer of the Army National Guard
