= Command Chief Master Sergeant, Air National Guard =

U.S. Air National Guard rank

Command Chief Master Sergeant, Air National Guard of Air National Guard

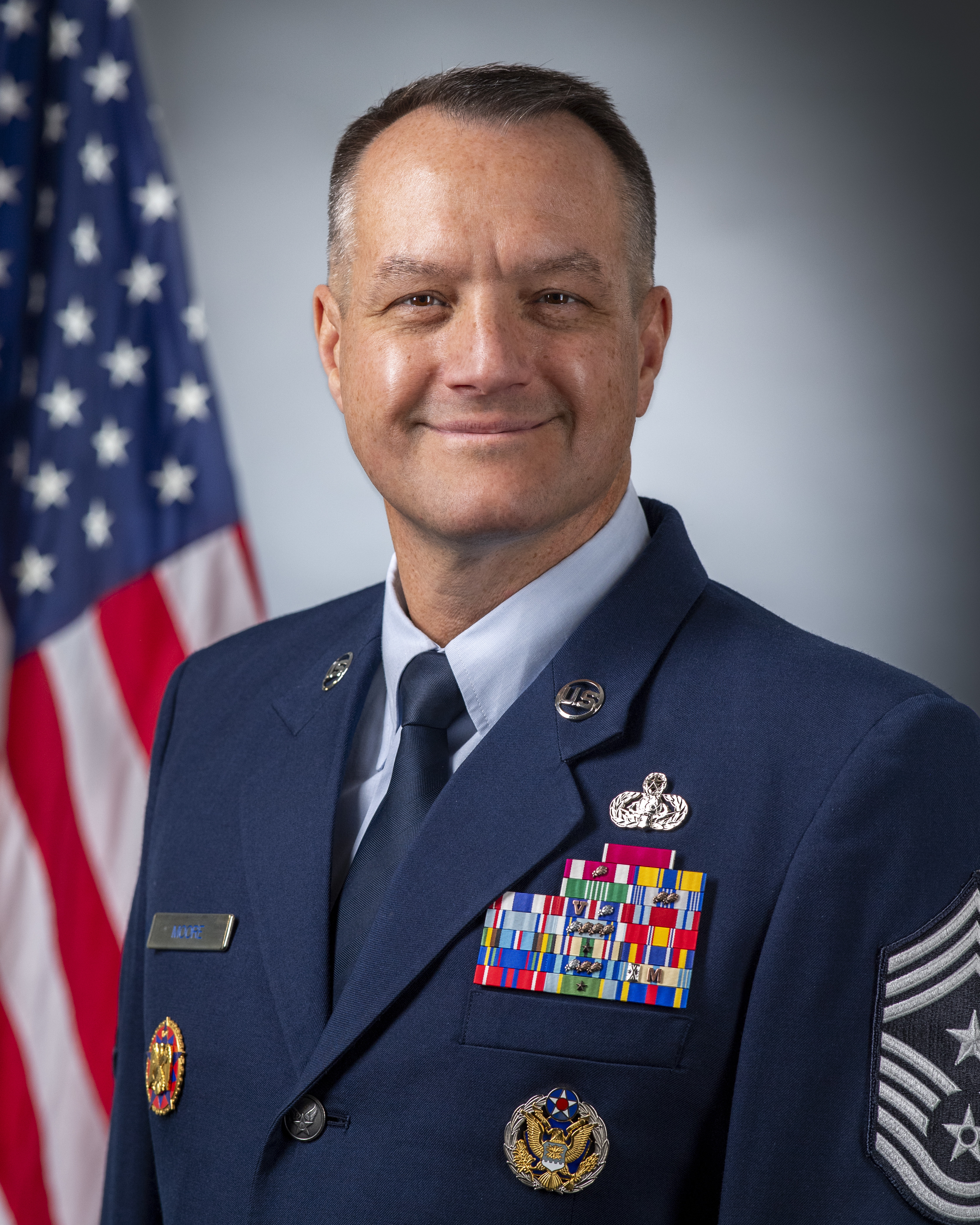
- Incumbent; CMSgt Joshua D. Moore since February 2025-
- Reports to: Director, US Air National Guard
- First holder: CMSgt Theodore "Ted" Jackson

The Command Chief Master Sergeant, Air National Guard is the principal advisor to the Director, Air National Guard (DANG) on enlisted airman and provides the enlisted perspective to the director on airmen's health, morale, welfare and career development.

Command Chief Master Sergeants of the Air National Guard
Senior Enlisted Advisor, Air National Guard
No.	Image	Name	Took office	Left office	Ref.
1		CMSgt Theodore "Ted" Jackson	May 1975	May 1977	
2		CMSgt Lynn Alexander	May 1977	August 1983	
3		CMSgt Bernard Carbon	August 1983	July 1986	
4		CMSgt Richard M. Green	August 1986	August 1990	
5		CMSgt Richard Moon	August 1990	1994	
6		CMSgt Edwin B. Brown	1994	July 1998	
Command Chief Master Sergeant, Air National Guard
7		CMSgt Gary R. Broadbent	July 1998	June 2001	
8		CMSgt Valarie D. Benton	June 2001	July 2004	
9		CMSgt Richard Smith	July 2004	June 2009	
10		CMSgt Christopher Muncy	June 2009	September 2012	
11		CMSgt James W. Hotaling	January 2013	May 2016	
12		CMSgt Ronald C. Anderson	May 2016	August 2020	
13		CMSgt Maurice L. Williams	August 2020	February 2025	
14		CMSgt Joshua D. Moore	February 2025 -	incumbent	

== See also ==
- Command Sergeant Major of the Army National Guard
- Command Chief Warrant Officer of the Army National Guard
