= Force Master Chief, Navy Reserve Force =

Force Master Chief of the Navy Reserve of US Navy Reserve
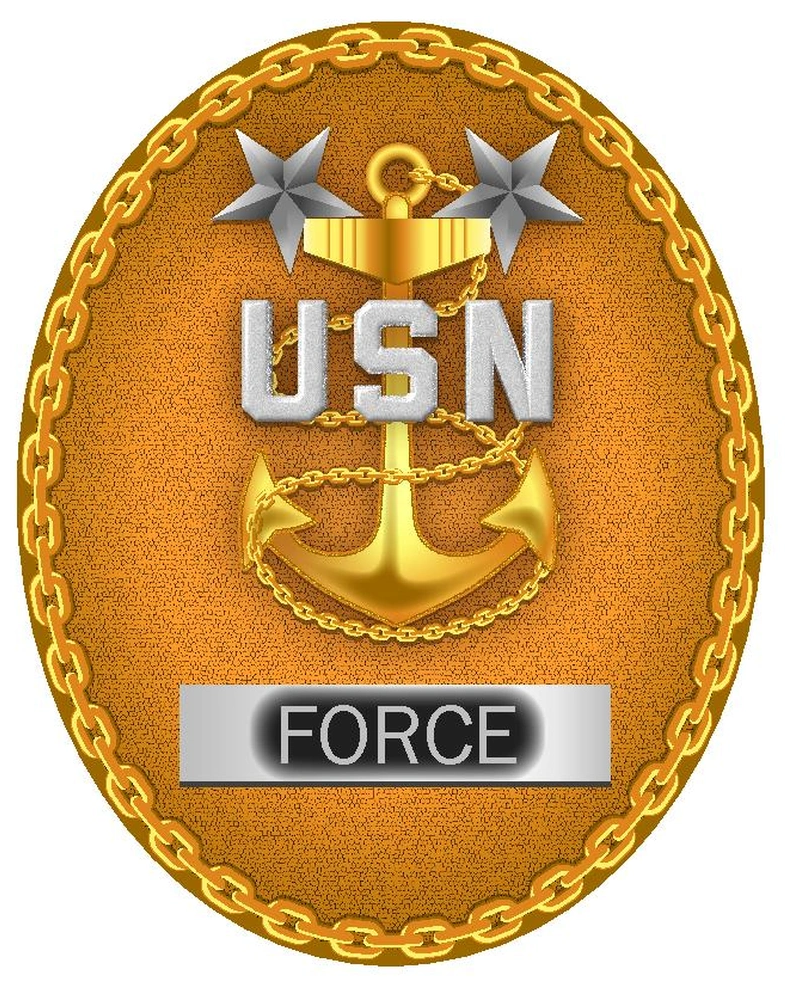

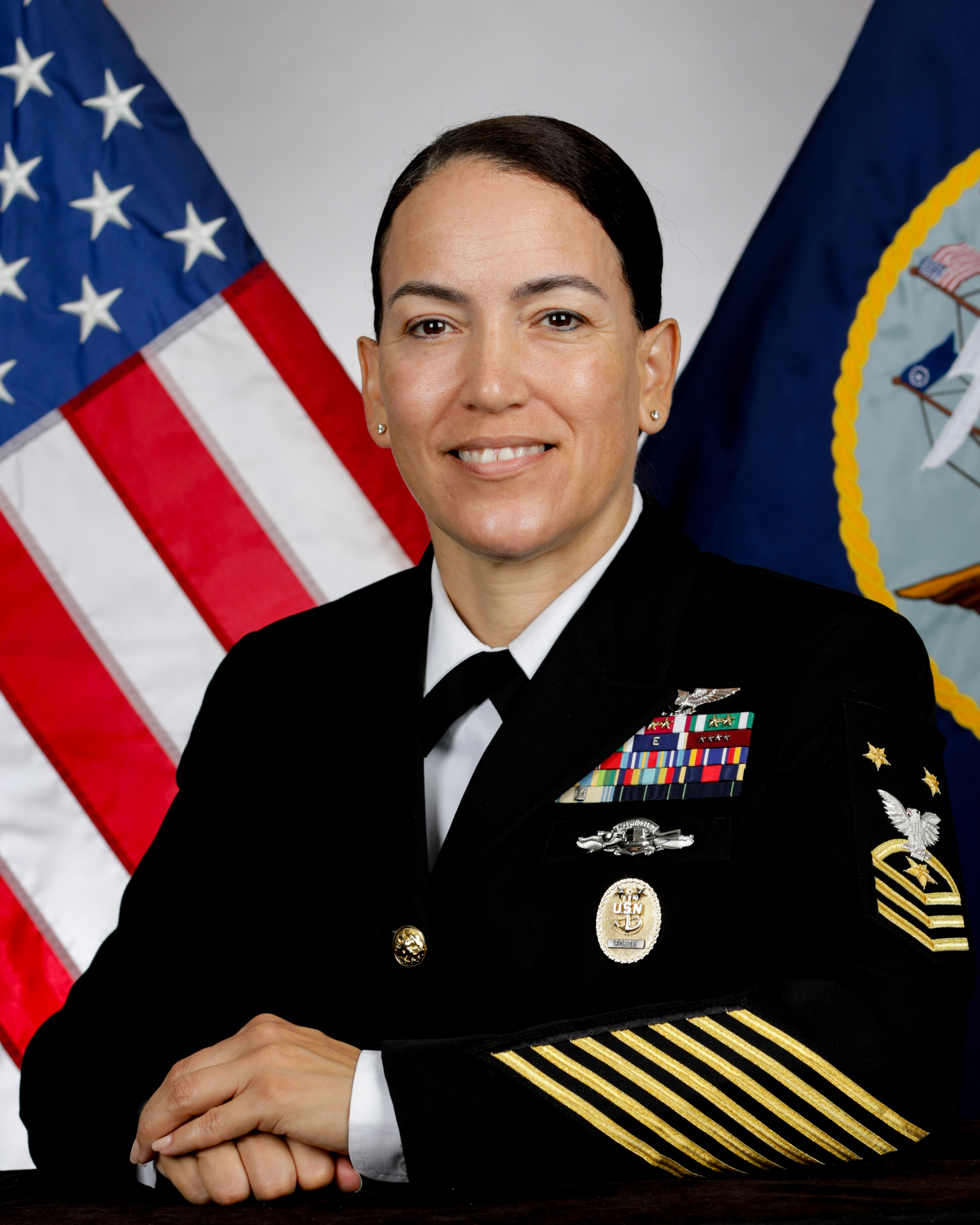
- Command Master Chief Nicole C. Rios
- Reports to: Chief of the Naval Reserve
- First holder: MCPO Richard P. Johnston

The Force Master Chief of the Navy Reserve (FORCM) is responsible for advising the Chief of Navy Reserve on the morale, retention, training, and welfare enlisted Navy Reserve personnel as well as active communications throughout the force, instilling naval heritage, and promoting Navy core values among all reserve sailors.

List of Force Master Chiefs of the Navy Reserve
No.	Image	Name	Took office	Left office	Ref.
Master Chief Petty Officer of the Naval Reserve (MCPONR)
1		Master Chief Richard P. Johnston	August 1973	August 1975	
Master Chief Petty Officer of the Naval Reserve Force (MCPOF)
2		Master Chief Joe Lalley	August 1975	August 1976	
3		Master Chief Harvey L. Murphey	August 1976	August 1979	
4		Master Chief Don W. McDow	June 1979	July 1981	
5		Master Chief Kenneth L. Gallaher	August 1981	June 1985	
6		Master Chief Larry L. Sorenson	June 1985	September 1988	
7		Master Chief Jeffery A. Brody	September 1988	October 1992	
8		Master Chief Paul R. Gauthe	October 1992	June 1995	
9		Master Chief Michael Krbec	June 1995	April 1998	
10		Master Chief Christopher C. Glennon	April 1998	July 2001	
11		Master Chief Thomas W. Mobley	July 2001	June 2005	
12		Master Chief David R. Pennington	June 2005	June 2008	
13		Master Chief Ronney A. Wright	June 2008	June 2011	
Force Master Chief of the Navy Reserve (FORCM)
14		Force Master Chief Christopher T. Wheeler	June 2011	October 2013	
15		Force Master Chief Clarence "CJ" Mitchell	October 2013	October 2017	
16		Force Master Chief Chris Kotz	October 2017	November 2021	
17		Force Master Chief Tracy L. Hunt	November 2021	November 2024	
18		Force Master Chief Nicole C. Rios	November 2024	incumbent	
